= List of populated places in Edirne Province =

Places in Turkey

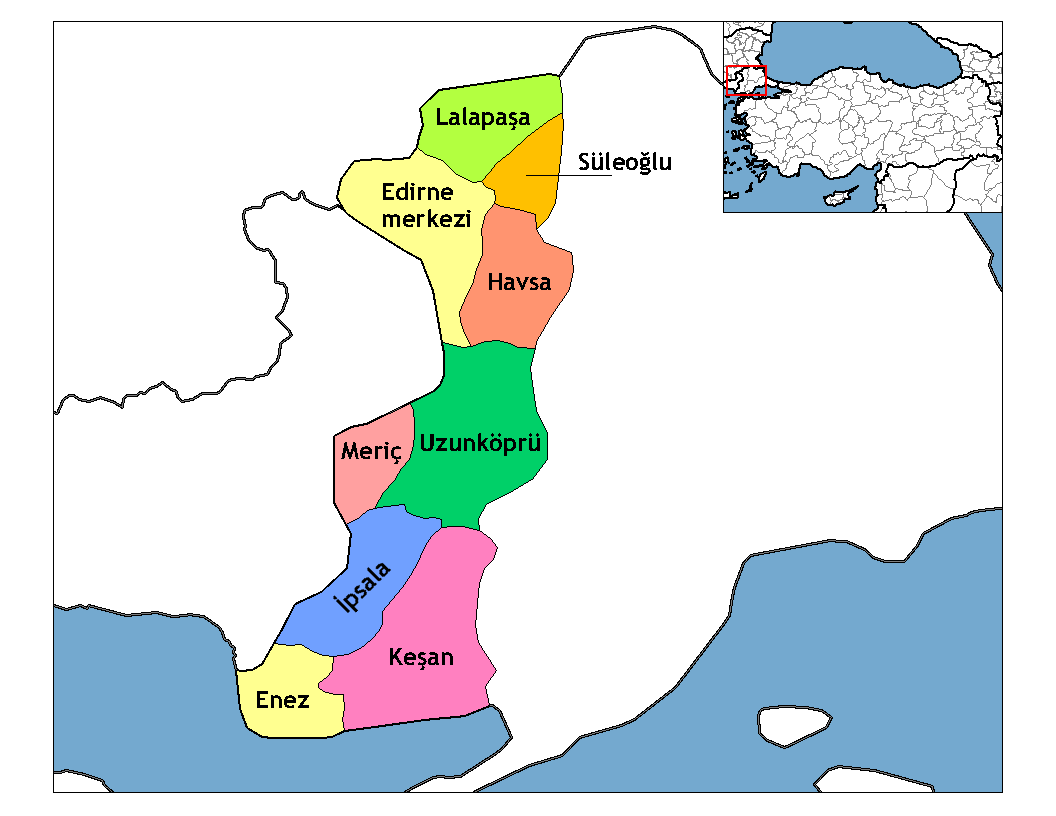
Edirne Province

Below is the list of populated places in Edirne Province, Turkey by the districts.

== Edirne (Merkez) ==
- Edirne
- Ahi
- Avarız
- Bosna
- Budakdoğanca
- Büyükdöllük
- Büyükismailce
- Değirmenyanı
- Demirhanlı
- Doyran
- Ekmekçi
- Elçili
- Eskikadın
- Hacıumur
- Hasanağa
- Hatipköy
- Hıdırağa
- İskender
- Karabulut
- Karakasım
- Karayusuf
- Kayapa
- Kemalköy
- Korucu
- Köşençiftliği
- Küçükdöllük
- Menekşesofular
- Muratçalı
- Musabeyli
- Orhaniye
- Sarayakpınar
- Sazlıdere
- Suakacağı
- Tayakadın
- Üyüklütatar
- Uzgaç
- Yenikadın
- Yolüstü

== Enez ==
- Enez
- Abdurrahim
- Büyükevren
- Çandır
- Çavuşköy
- Çeribaşı
- Gülçavuş
- Hasköy
- Hisarlı
- Işıklı
- Karaincirli
- Kocaali
- Küçükevren
- Şehitler
- Sultaniça
- Sütçüler
- Umurbey
- Vakıf
- Yazır
- Yenice

== Havsa ==
- Havsa
- Abalar
- Arpaç
- Azatlı
- Bakışlar
- Bostanlı
- Çukurköy
- Habiller
- Hasköy
- Kabaağaç
- Köseömer
- Kulubalık
- Kuzucu
- Musulca
- Naipyusuf
- Necatiye
- Oğulpaşa
- Osmanlı
- Şerbettar
- Söğütlüdere
- Tahal
- Taptık
- Yolageldi

== İpsala ==
- Esetçe
- İpsala
- Yenikarpuzlu
- Aliçopehlivan
- Balabancık
- Hacı
- Hıdırköy
- İbriktepe
- Karaağaç
- Kocahıdır
- Korucu
- Koyuntepe
- Kumdere
- Küçükdoğanca
- Paşaköy
- Pazardere
- Sarıcaali
- Sarpdere
- Sultan
- Tevfikiye
- Turpçular
- Yapıldak

== Keşan ==
- Beğendik
- Keşan
- Yenimuhacir
- Akçeşme
- Akhoca
- Altıntaş
- Bahçeköy
- Barağı
- Beyköy
- Boztepe
- Büyükdoğanca
- Çamlıca
- Çelebi
- Çeltik
- Çobançeşmesi
- Danişment
- Dişbudak
- Erikli
- Gökçetepe
- Gündüzler
- Kadıköy
- Karacaali
- Karahisar
- Karasatı
- Karlı
- Kılıçköy
- Kızkapan
- Koruklu
- Kozköy
- Küçükdoğanca
- Lalacık
- Mahmutköy
- Maltepe
- Mecidiye
- Mercan
- Orhaniye
- Pırnar
- Şabanmera
- Sazlıdere
- Seydiköy
- Siğilli
- Şükrüköy
- Suluca
- Türkmen
- Yaylaköy
- Yeniceçiftlik
- Yerlisu
- Yeşilköy

== Lalapaşa ==
- Lalapaşa
- Büyünlü
- Çallıdere
- Çatma
- Çömlek
- Çömlekakpınar
- Demirköy
- Doğanköy
- Dombay
- Hacıdanişment
- Hacılar
- Hamzabeyli
- Hanlıyenice
- Hüseyinpınar
- Kalkansöğüt
- Kavaklı
- Küçünlü
- Ömeroba
- Ortakçı
- Saksağan
- Sarıdanişment
- Sinanköy
- Süleymandanişment
- Taşlımüsellim
- Tuğlalık
- Uzunbayır
- Vaysal
- Yünlüce

== Meriç ==
- Küplü
- Meriç
- Subaşı
- Adasarhanlı
- Akçadam
- Akıncılar
- Alibey
- Büyükaltıağaç
- Hasırcıarnavutköy
- Kadıdondurma
- Karahamza
- Karayusuflu
- Kavaklı
- Küçükaltıağaç
- Küpdere
- Nasuhbey
- Olacak
- Paşayenice
- Rahmanca
- Saatağacı
- Serem
- Umurca
- Yakupbey
- Yenicegörüce

== Süloğlu ==
- Süloğlu
- Akardere
- Büyük Gerdelli
- Domurcalı
- Geçkinli
- Keramettin
- Küküler
- Sülecik
- Taşlısekban
- Tatarlar
- Yağcılı

== Uzunköprü ==
- Kırcasalih
- Uzunköprü
- Alıç
- Altınyazı
- Aslıhan
- Balaban
- Balabankoru
- Başağıl
- Bayramlı
- Beykonak
- Bıldır
- Çakmak
- Çalıköy
- Çavuşlu
- Çiftlikköy
- Çobanpınar
- Danişment
- Değirmenci
- Dereköy
- Elmalı
- Eskiköy
- Gazihalil
- Gazimehmet
- Gemici
- Hamidiye
- Hamitli
- Harmanlı
- Hasanpınar
- Kadıköy
- Karabürçek
- Karapınar
- Karayayla
- Kavacık
- Kavakayazma
- Kiremitçisalih
- Kırkkavak
- Kırköy
- Kurdu
- Kurtbey
- Kurttepe
- Maksutlu
- Malkoç
- Meşeli
- Muhacırkadı
- Ömerbey
- Saçlımüsellim
- Salarlı
- Sazlımalkoç
- Sığırcılı
- Sipahi
- Süleymaniye
- Sultanşah
- Türkobası
- Turnacı
- Yağmurca
