= Uzunköprü Bridge =

Ottoman stone bridge

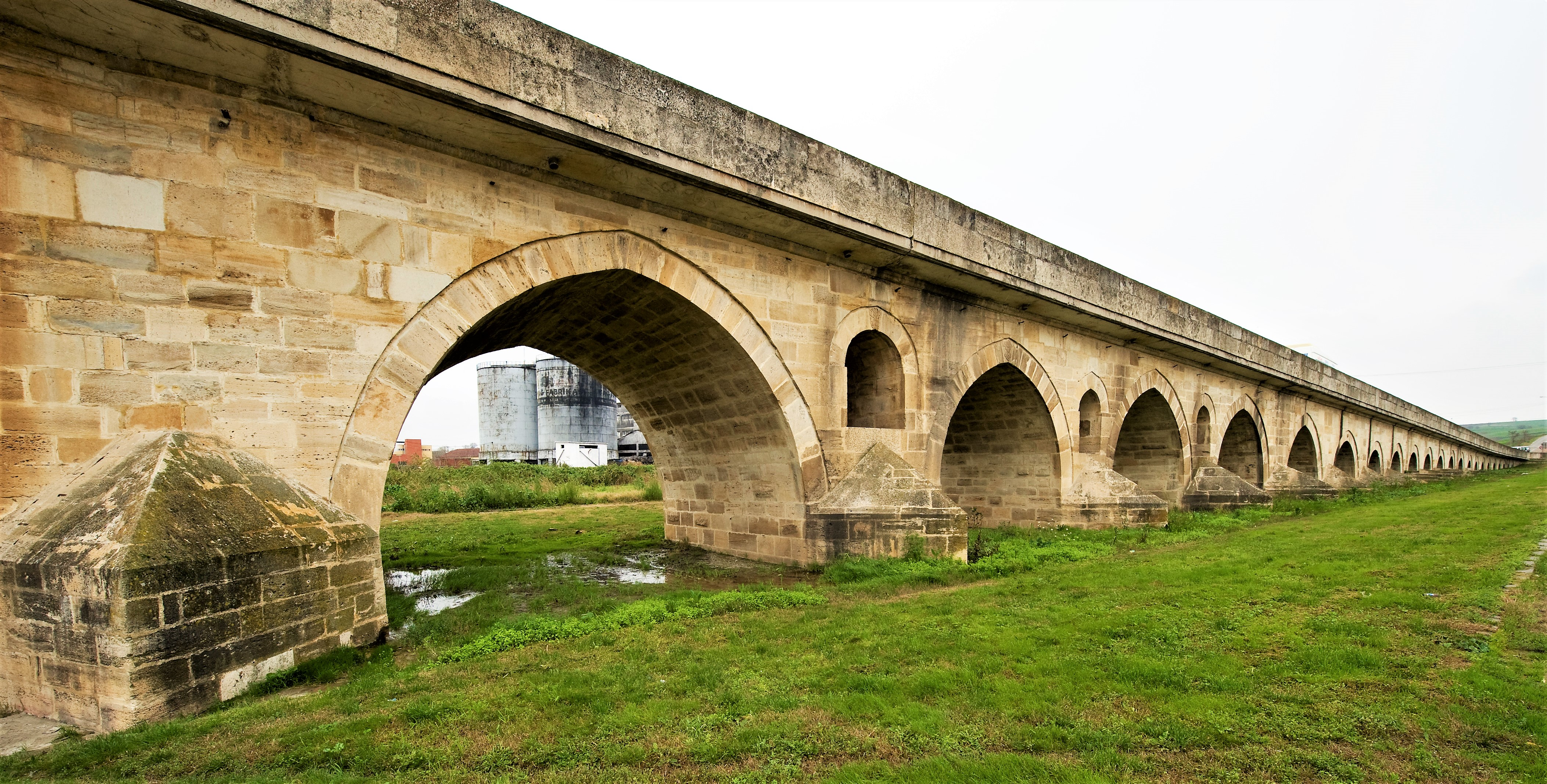
- Uzunköprü in 2008
- Coordinates: 41°17′N 26°41′E
- Crosses: Ergene
- Locale: Uzunköprü, Edirne, Turkey

Characteristics
- Total length: 1,306.2 metres (4,285 ft)
- Width: 6.80 metres (22.3 ft)
- No. of spans: 168

History
- Designer: Muslihiddin
- Construction start: 1426 or 1427
- Construction end: 1443 or 1444
- Opened: 1444
- Closed: 2013 (heavy vehicles); September 2021 (all)

Location
- Interactive map of Uzunköprü Bridge

Uzunköprü (lit. transl. Long Bridge), formerly Cisr-i Ergene, is a 15th-century Ottoman stone bridge over the River Ergene in Edirne Province, northwestern Turkey. The bridge gave its name to the nearby town of Uzunköprü and is claimed to be the world's longest stone bridge. It was built to facilitate crossing the Ergene for troops during river floods, and to replace a wooden bridge; previous structures had rapidly deteriorated or had been destroyed.

Construction of the bridge began in 1426/7, and ended in 1443/4. The newly-completed bridge had a length of 1,392 metres (4,567 ft), spanning 174 arches. The stones include several figures and motifs, which were replaced over time.

The bridge was repaired following earthquakes and floods, which decreased its length, and the number of its arches. In 1971, it was widened to 6.80 metres (22.3 ft) and was covered over with steel and concrete. Heavy vehicles were banned from using the bridge in 2013, as an alternative concrete bridge was being built. The bridge was closed to traffic in September 2021 for another restoration project after cracks had started to appear in the stones a few years earlier. One aim of the restoration is to excavate some of the buried arches.

== Background ==
The swampy nature of the area meant it unsuitable for settlement until the Ottoman period; the earliest settlers lived in the surrounding hilly regions. The ground where the bridge is located has a structure consisting of clay and sandstone. This part of the Ergene river was not a place frequently used for crossings by the public, but was used by Ottoman soldiers participating in expeditions into Rumelia. The waterflow decreased during the summer months, even allowing simple crossings with horses. During the spring, however, melting snow that was fed into the river caused the area to flood. These occasional floods of the river made military crossings difficult.

Several wooden bridges on the same location had already preceded the current structure. These were destroyed quickly by either enemies or floods. Some crossings by villagers were also made via boats using multiple small piers along the coast. To allow for crossings during rising water, Sultan Murad II ordered a new stone bridge to be constructed that was long and strong enough to stretch the entire swamp affected by the river. Additionally, the stone bridge provided a safe crossing of the marshy location on the Gallipoli–Edirne route.

== History ==
=== Construction and opening ===
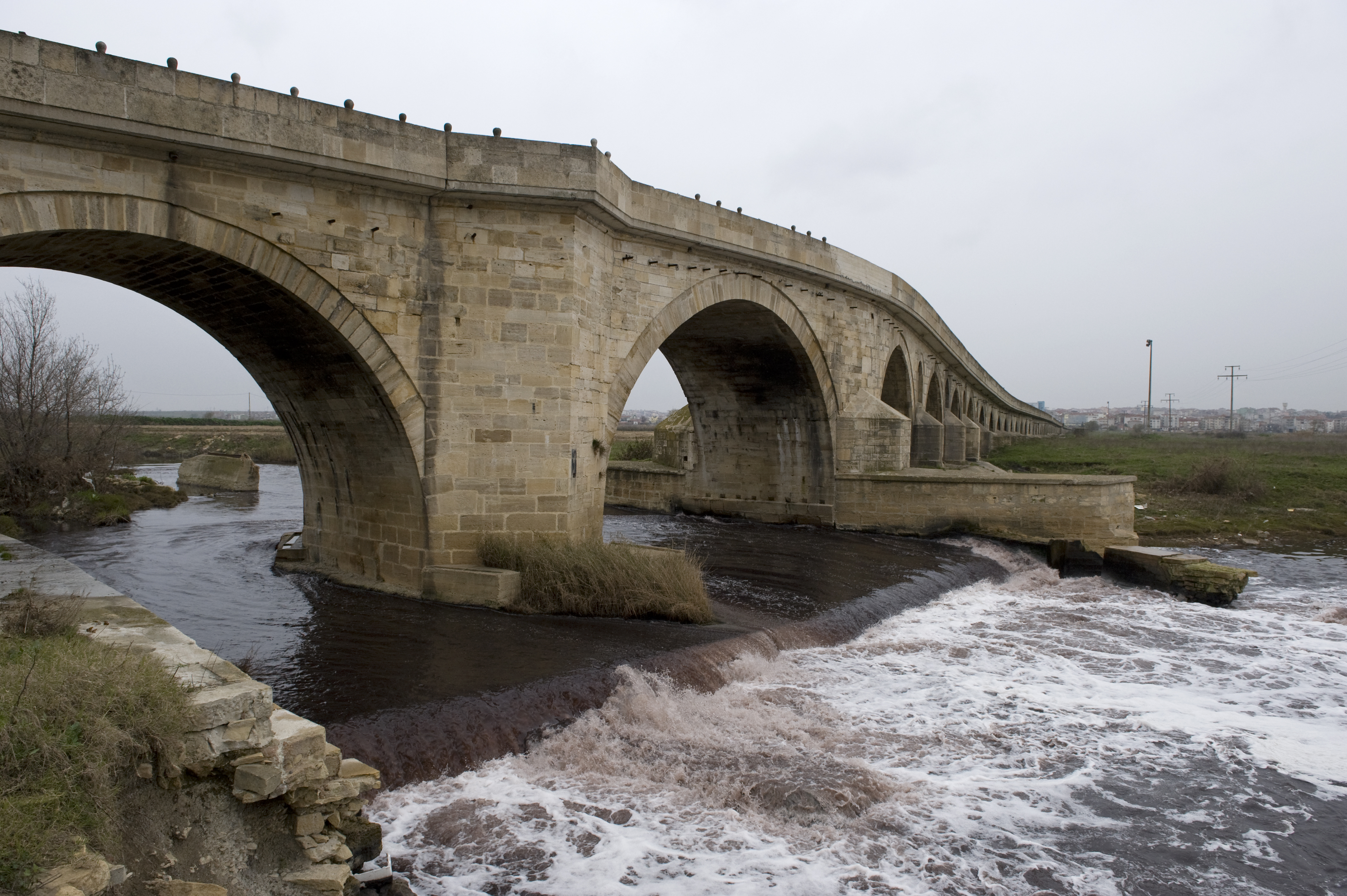
Construction of the arches over the fast-flowing the river proved to be a technical challenge

The land where Uzunköprü Bridge was to be built had first to be cleared up from spinose structures and other vegetation, which had provided cover for thieves and thugs. Ottoman scholars differ about the year construction of the bridge began. According to Hoca Sadeddin Efendi, it was started in 1426/7, but Karaçelebizade Abdülaziz Efendi wrote that construction on the bridge was begun in 1427/8 by the sultan's head architect Muslihiddin and craftsman Mehmed, and that it was completed in 1443/4.

Stones were sourced from quarries in the nearby villages of Yağmurca, Eskiköy and Hasırcıarnavutköy. The bridge was built using pre-cut blocks of limestone. Khorasan mortar, which slowly hardens on contact with the air, was used to bind the blocks together. At places where the abutments could not be built on a solid rock foundation, wooden piles were used. It is not known if cofferdams were used, but it is likely they were not, as most of the work on the bridge would have taken place during dry periods, when the river level was lower. Once the foundation was ready, the stones making up the arches were laid using wooden molds in the shapes of the arches. At wet periods or at places where the river was running, the formwork was placed in special slots, which was a difficult process. This is seen as the reason as to why construction took sixteen years.

The bridge was named Cisr-i Ergene ("Ergene Bridge"). A mosque, imaret and madrasa were also built next to the bridge where the town of Uzunköprü (lit. transl. Long Bridge) was founded, which took its name from the bridge. Meanwhile, the village of Yayalar arose at the other side of the river. The magnificent opening ceremony for the bridge was attended by the sultan, who was returning to Istanbul after his victory at the Battle of Varna. With the completion of the bridge, the area became a part of an active transportation network within Rumelia, helping the development of the new town.

=== 16th to 20th century ===
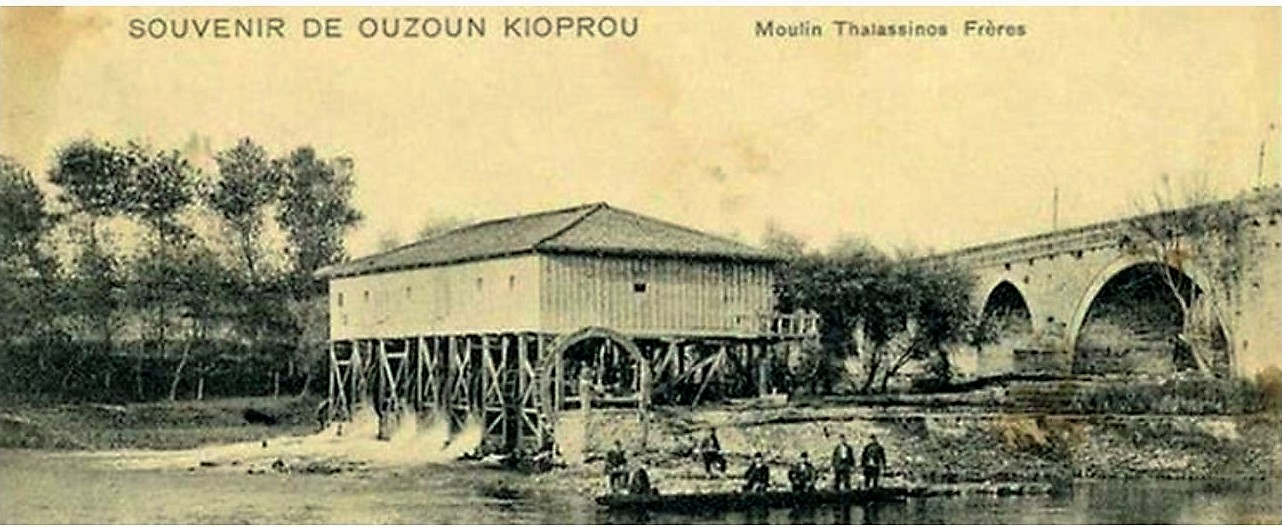
The bridge and its watermill in 1908

Uzunköprü Bridge is first known to have been repaired in 1546, when work was done to the bridge and several mills on the Ergene. The first major restoration of the structure took place in 1620. The bridge was briefly renamed to Kasr-i Ergene in 1718; nine years later in 1727, French explorer Aubry de La Mottraye recorded in his travelogue that the local residents referred to both the town and the bridge as Uzunköprü.

The second major restoration took place in 1822/3, after earthquakes and flooding caused four of the bridge's arches to collapse. These were replaced by three larger arches, per the decree of Mahmud II. After a series of earthquakes that occurred during the late 19th century destroyed three of the arches in 1901, two new arches were built. These were completed three years later in 1904. Some minor repairs later took place in 1891. Sometime during the rule of Abdul Hamid II (1876–1909), the original inscription on the bridge about its completion was removed and placed on a fountain inside the town.

In 1908, the municipality removed stone blocks from the bridge to make drinking fountains inside the town. In 1956, following a particularly harsh winter, flooding swept away the last of the bridge's two mills. In 1957, a 25-metre (82 ft) section of the dock was filled in to create a car park. From 1964 to 1971, the bridge underwent a restoration by the General Directorate of Highways, who widened it by 150 centimetres (4.9 ft) to 6.80 metres (22.3 ft), and covered the top with a 20-centimetre (0.66 ft) steel and concrete deck for the use of two-way traffic. The resulting heavy traffic that used the bridge caused severe damage to its structure. Gaps between stones that had appeared were filled with stone mortar in 1993.

=== 21st century ===
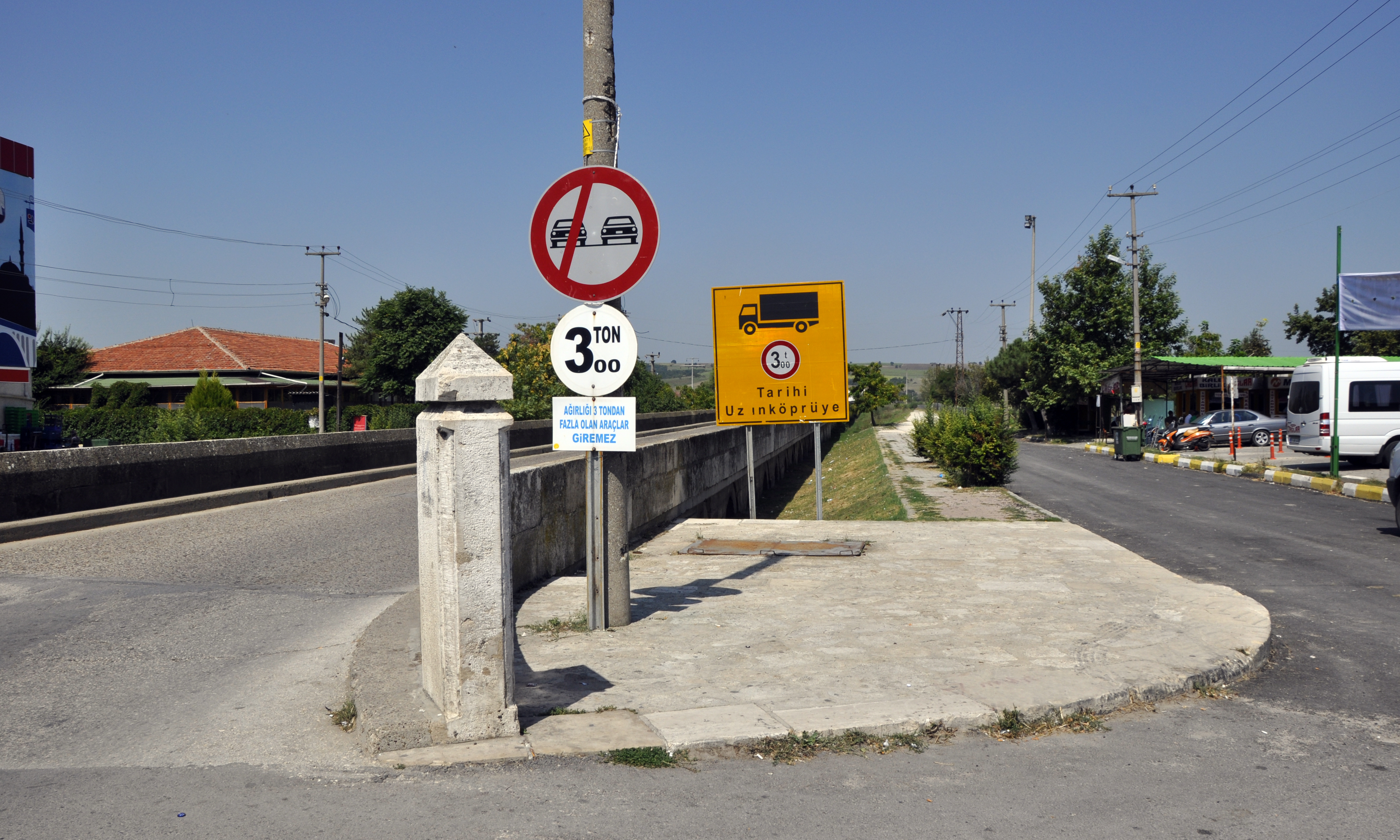
Signs indicating the ban of heavy traffic at the start of the bridge

A new concrete bridge built one kilometre (0.62 miles) away was opened in 2013, and heavy vehicles were prohibited from using the historic bridge. In 2015, the bridge was added to the UNESCO World Heritage Site Tentative List in the Cultural category. In 2018, a picture of the historic bridge was meant to be put on the first page of the new Turkish passport. However, the Ministry of Interior accidentally used a picture of the Meriç Bridge instead, while the photo was still labelled as Uzunköprü.

In early 2019, cracks started to appear on the stones at the base that could be seen every 50–60 metres (160–200 ft). Locals requested the bridge to be restored to its original version as it deviated from its form with the 1971 restoration, and for it to be preserved as a cultural asset. In March 2021, it was announced that the tender for the restoration was completed, and that work on the bridge was set to start soon.

In September 2021, the bridge was closed in order for further restoration work to be done, including the repair of 25 arches, the replacement of the asphalt concrete road surface with stones, and the replacement of any missing blocks of stone. At the time it was announced that the restoration would take between three and four years to complete. As the initial completion date neared in February 2024, it was announced that the project had been delayed to 2027.

== Specifications ==
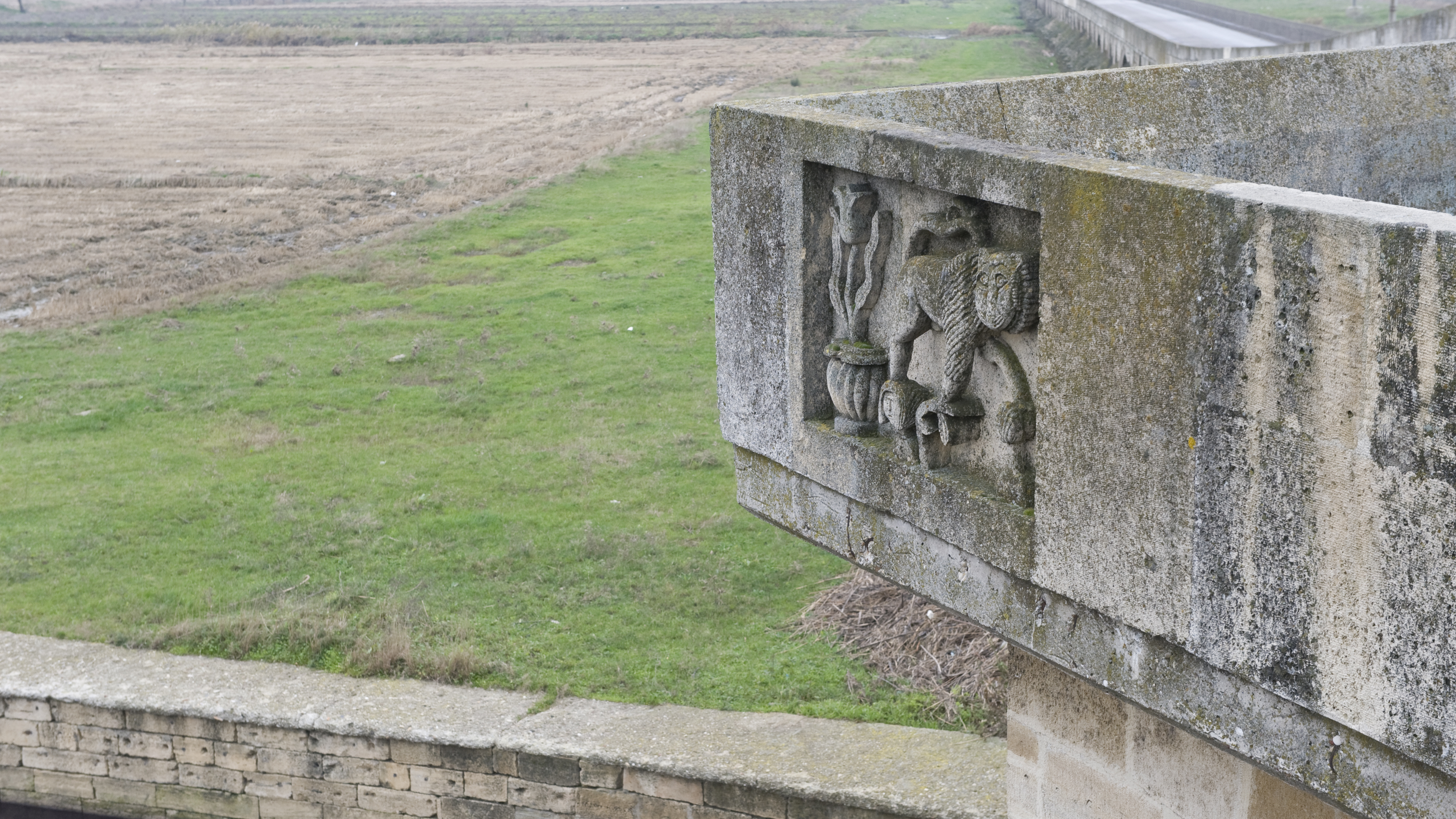
A tulip and lion figure on the bridge

Uzunköprü is the longest stone bridge in the world. When it was first completed, was 1,392 metres (4,567 ft) long and 5.24 metres (17.2 ft) wide. The bridge was the longest in the Ottoman Empire and later Turkey, a title which it held for 530 years until 1973, when it was surpassed by the Bosphorus Bridge in Istanbul. The Ottoman explorer Evliya Çelebi visited the town of Uzunköprü in 1658, and described the bridge as being 2000 "stretched steps" long. In 1978, the length of the bridge was measured to be 1,266 metres (4,154 ft); it was determined to be 1,254 metres (4,114 ft) in 1989. In 2018, the bridge was found to be 1,306.2 metres (4,285 ft) long, when its length was measured for the Guinness Book of World Records.

The bridge was originally built with 174 arches, the largest of which had a span of 14 metres (46 ft). Some of the arches are pointed and some are round. Some of the abutments have carvings of figures of animals such as elephants, lions and birds, some of which are no longer visible. There are also motifs related to the Seljuk Empire. It is believed that some figures and motifs were altered during restorations that took place before the 19th century. Restoration work on the bridge over the years has reduced the number of arches to 172. Of these, eight have since become buried underground, meaning that there are now 164 arches. The 2021 restoration work aims to unearth several of these buried arches. There are two balconies on the bridge. One is above arches 40 and 41, and is 3.40 metres (11.2 ft) by 0.40 metres (1.3 ft) in length. The other balcony is above arches 102 and 103, and measures 9.40 metres (30.8 ft) by 0.40 metres (1.3 ft).
