= Tatarlar =

Tartarlar may refer to:

- Tatars
- Tatalılar, Azerbaijan
- Tatarlar, Süloğlu, Turkey
