= Bayramlı, Uzunköprü =

Bayramli Търново, Tırnova
- Village
- Location within Turkey Location within Marmara
- Coordinates: 41°18′N 26°49′E
- Country: Turkey
- Province: Edirne
- District: Uzunköprü
- Elevation: 76 m (249 ft)
- Population (2022): 339
- Time zone: UTC+3 (TRT)
- Postal code: 22200
- Area code: 0284

Bayramli is a village in Uzunköprü District of Edirne Province, Turkey. Its population is 339 (2022). It is situated in the Eastern Thrace plains. The distance to Uzunköprü is 15 kilometres (9.3 mi). The old name of this village was Tarnovo (Търново) or Tırnova. It was a big Bulgarian village during the Ottoman Empire era. But after the Second Balkan War the Bulgarian population was forced to leave the settlement.
