= Elmalı, Uzunköprü =

Elmalı Ermeniköy
- Village
- Location within Turkey Location within Marmara
- Coordinates: 41°10′N 26°54′E
- Country: Turkey
- Province: Edirne
- District: Uzunköprü
- Elevation: 119 m (390 ft)
- Population (2022): 732
- Time zone: UTC+3 (TRT)
- Postal code: 22200
- Area code: 0284

Elmalı is a village in Uzunköprü District of Edirne Province, Turkey. Its population is 732 (2022). It is situated in the Eastern Thrace plains. The distance to Uzunköprü is 20 kilometres (12 mi). The old name of this village is Ermeniköy. It was a Bulgarian village during the Ottoman Empire era. But after the Second Balkan War the Bulgarian population was forced to leave the settlement.
