= Kırcasalih =

Town in Edirne Province, Turkey

- Municipality
- Location in Turkey Kırcasalih (Marmara)
- Coordinates: 41°24′N 26°48′E
- Country: Turkey
- Province: Edirne
- District: Uzunköprü
- Elevation: 70 m (230 ft)
- Population (2022): 2,503
- Time zone: UTC+3 (TRT)
- Postal code: 22260
- Area code: 0284

Kırcasalih (Greek: Μέγα Ζαλούφι, Bulgarian: Залъф) is a town (belde) in the Uzunköprü District, Edirne Province, Turkey. Its population is 2,503 (2022). It is situated in the eastern Trakya (Thrace) plains. The distance to Uzunköprü is 18 kilometres (11 mi). The village was founded in the 14th century just after the early Turkish settlement in Trakya began. The earliest name of the town was Karacasalih. However, in the 18th century the government settled Greeks and Christian Albanians in the town after an attempted rebellion. Most Turks left the town, and the town was renamed Zalof. The newcomers excelled in viticulture. But during the compulsory population exchange between Greece and Turkey (Turkish: mübadele) in 1920s, the Greek population was replaced with Pomaks and Turks from Greece and North Macedonia.
