= Yünlüce =

Yünlüce may refer to:

- Yünlüce, Elâzığ
- Yünlüce, Lalapaşa
- Yünlüce, Lice
