= Süloğlu District =

District of Edirne Province, Turkey

- District
- Map showing Süloğlu District in Edirne Province

- Location in Turkey Süloğlu District (Marmara)
- Coordinates: 41°46′N 26°55′E
- Country: Turkey
- Province: Edirne
- Seat: Süloğlu

Government
  - Kaymakam: Özgür Kaya
- Area: 342 km^{2} (132 sq mi)
- Population (2022): 6,348
  - Density: 19/km^{2} (48/sq mi)
- Time zone: UTC+3 (TRT)
- Website: www.suloglu.gov.tr

Süloğlu District is a district of the Edirne Province of Turkey. Its seat is the town of Süloğlu. Its area is 342 km^{2}, and its population is 6,348 (2022). The district was established in 1990 from part of the Edirne District. Süloğlu District borders the Lalapaşa District to the north, the Kırklareli Province to the east, the Havsa District to the south and the Edirne District to the west.

== Composition ==
There is one municipality in Süloğlu District:

- Süloğlu

There are 10 villages in Süloğlu District:

- Akardere
- Büyük Gerdelli
- Domurcalı
- Geçkinli
- Keramettin
- Küküler
- Sülecik
- Taşlısekban
- Tatarlar
- Yağcılı
