= Saksağan =

- Saksağan, Lalapaşa
- Saksağan, mountain (az:Sağsağan (dağ))
- Saksağan Kalesi
