= Kurtbey =

- Village
- Location within Turkey Location within Marmara
- Coordinates: 41°09′N 26°35′E
- Country: Turkey
- Province: Edirne
- District: Uzunköprü
- Elevation: 70 m (230 ft)
- Population (2022): 1,128
- Time zone: UTC+3 (TRT)
- Postal code: 22360
- Area code: 0284

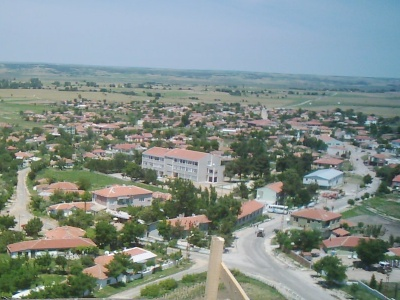
An image of Kurtbey.

Kurtbey is a village in the Uzunköprü District of Edirne Province, Turkey. Its population is 1,128 (2022). It is situated in the eastern Trakya (Thrace) plains. The distance to Uzunköprü is 25 kilometres (16 mi). The settlement was founded during the Rise of the Ottoman Empire (14th-15th centuries) by an akıncı (Ottoman militia the 14th to 16th centuries) chief named Kurtbey. In the 19th century, especially following the Russo-Turkish War (1877-1878), Muslim refugees from Bulgaria (mostly Pomaks) and Romania were also settled in Kurtbey. Between 1954 and the 2013 reorganisation, it was a town (belde). The town economy depends on agriculture. The crops are wheat, rice, sunflower, sugarbeet and watermelon.
