= Lalapaşa =

- Municipality
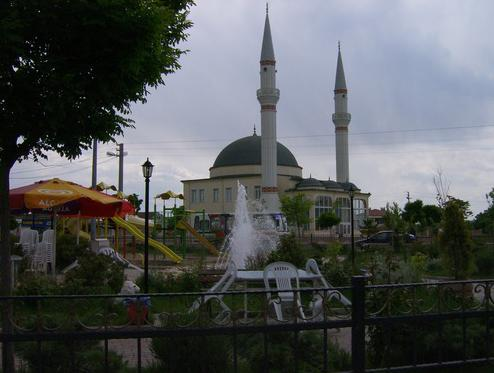
- The park and the mosque at the center of Lalapaşa.

- Location within Turkey Location within Marmara
- Coordinates: 41°50′20″N 26°44′05″E
- Country: Turkey
- Province: Edirne
- District: Lalapaşa

Government
  - Mayor: Zafer Sezgin Geldi (CHP)
- Elevation: 72 m (236 ft)
- Population (2022): 1,560
- Time zone: UTC+3 (TRT)
- Postal code: 22970
- Area code: 0284
- Website: www.lalapasa.bel.tr

Lalapaşa (Greek: Δρογγύλιον) is a town in Edirne Province in the Marmara region of Turkey. It is the seat of Lalapaşa District. Its population is 1,560 (2022). The mayor is Zafer Sezgin Geldi (CHP).

== History ==
Lalapaşa was conquered by Lala Şahin Pasha in 1361. The town was named after him. Until the Balkan Wars, the town was known as Paşaköy (translated: Pashatown).

== Geography ==
The town is located 22 kilometers from Edirne and around 260 kilometers from Istanbul. The district borders Bulgaria to the north and west, the Edirne district to the south-west, Süloğlu to the south-east and the Kırklareli province to the north-east.
