= Beykonak, Uzunköprü =

Village in Turkey

Beykonak
- Village
- Location within Turkey Location within Marmara
- Coordinates: 41.1746°N 26.7950°E
- Country: Turkey
- Province: Edirne
- District: Uzunköprü
- Population (2022): 114
- Time zone: UTC+3 (TRT)

Beykonak (also: Beykonağı) is a village in the Uzunköprü District of Edirne Province in Turkey. Its population is 114 (2022).
