= Keramettin, Süloğlu =

Village in Turkey

Keramettin
- Village
- Location within Turkey Location within Marmara
- Coordinates: 41°47′14″N 26°58′34″E
- Country: Turkey
- Province: Edirne
- District: Süloğlu
- Population (2022): 346
- Time zone: UTC+3 (TRT)

Keramettin is a village in the Süloğlu District of Edirne Province in Turkey. Its population is 346 (2022).
