= Sinanköy, Lalapaşa =

Village in Turkey

Sinanköy
- Village
- Location within Turkey Location within Marmara
- Country: Turkey
- Province: Edirne
- District: Lalapaşa
- Population (2022): 359
- Time zone: UTC+3 (TRT)

Sinanköy is a village in the Lalapaşa District of Edirne Province in Turkey. The village had a population of 359 in 2022.
