= Hanlıyenice, Lalapaşa =

Village in Turkey

Hanlıyenice
- Village
- Location within Turkey Location within Marmara
- Coordinates: 41°52′N 26°42′E
- Country: Turkey
- Province: Edirne
- District: Lalapaşa
- Population (2022): 225
- Time zone: UTC+3 (TRT)

Hanlıyenice is a village in the Lalapaşa District of Edirne Province in Turkey. The village had a population of 225 in 2022.
