= Kalkansöğüt, Lalapaşa =

Village in Turkey

Kalkansöğüt
- Village
- Location within Turkey Location within Marmara
- Coordinates: 41°58′N 26°49′E
- Country: Turkey
- Province: Edirne
- District: Lalapaşa
- Population (2022): 90
- Time zone: UTC+3 (TRT)

Kalkansöğüt is a village in the Lalapaşa District of Edirne Province in Turkey. The village had a population of 90 in 2022.
