= Ortakçı, Lalapaşa =

Village in Turkey

Ortakçı
- Village
- Location within Turkey Location within Marmara
- Country: Turkey
- Province: Edirne
- District: Lalapaşa
- Population (2022): 264
- Time zone: UTC+3 (TRT)

Ortakçı is a village in the Lalapaşa District of Edirne Province in Turkey. The village had a population of 264 in 2022.
