= Kavaklı, Lalapaşa =

Village in Turkey

Kavaklı
- Village
- Location within Turkey Location within Marmara
- Coordinates: 41.7946°N 26.7528°E
- Country: Turkey
- Province: Edirne
- District: Lalapaşa
- Population (2022): 76
- Time zone: UTC+3 (TRT)

Kavaklı is a village in the Lalapaşa District of Edirne Province in Turkey. The village had a population of 76 in 2022.
