= Taşlımüsellim, Lalapaşa =

Village in Turkey

Taşlımüsellim
- Village
- Location within Turkey Location within Marmara
- Coordinates: 41°49′N 26°46′E
- Country: Turkey
- Province: Edirne
- District: Lalapaşa
- Population (2022): 226
- Time zone: UTC+3 (TRT)

Taşlımüsellim is a village in the Lalapaşa District of Edirne Province in Turkey. The village had a population of 226 in 2022.
