= Çömlek, Lalapaşa =

Village in Turkey

Çömlek
- Village
- Country: Turkey
- Province: Edirne
- District: Lalapaşa
- Population (2022): 111
- Time zone: UTC+3 (TRT)

Çömlek (also: Çömlekköy) is a village in the Lalapaşa District of Edirne Province in Turkey. The village had a population of 111 in 2022.
