= Çobanpınar, Uzunköprü =

Village in Turkey

Çobanpınar
- Village
- Location within Turkey Location within Marmara
- Coordinates: 41.1781°N 26.5669°E
- Country: Turkey
- Province: Edirne
- District: Uzunköprü
- Population (2022): 77
- Time zone: UTC+3 (TRT)

Çobanpınar (also: Çobanpınarı) is a village in the Uzunköprü District of Edirne Province in Turkey. Its population is 77 (2022).
