= Çallıdere, Lalapaşa =

Village in Turkey

Çallıdere
- Village
- Location within Turkey Location within Marmara
- Coordinates: 41.9411°N 26.725°E
- Country: Turkey
- Province: Edirne
- District: Lalapaşa
- Population (2022): 94
- Time zone: UTC+3 (TRT)

Çallıdere is a village in the Lalapaşa District of Edirne Province in Turkey. The village had a population of 94 in 2022.
