= Yağcılı, Süloğlu =

Village in Turkey

Yağcılı
- Village
- Location within Turkey Location within Marmara
- Country: Turkey
- Province: Edirne
- District: Süloğlu
- Population (2022): 203
- Time zone: UTC+3 (TRT)

Yağcılı is a village in the Süloğlu District of Edirne Province in Turkey. Its population is 203 (2022).

== Population ==
Historical population
Year	Pop.	±% p.a.
2007	340	—
2012	308	−1.96%
2017	267	−2.82%
2022	203	−5.33%
Source: TÜIK (2007-2022)
