= Türkobası, Uzunköprü =

Village in Turkey

Türkobası
- Village
- Location within Turkey Location within Marmara
- Country: Turkey
- Province: Edirne
- District: Uzunköprü
- Population (2022): 195
- Time zone: UTC+3 (TRT)

Türkobası is a village in the Uzunköprü District of Edirne Province in Turkey. Its population is 195 (2022).
