= Kavakayazma, Uzunköprü =

Village in Turkey

Kavakayazma
- Village
- Location within Turkey Location within Marmara
- Coordinates: 41°08′N 26°32′E
- Country: Turkey
- Province: Edirne
- District: Uzunköprü
- Population (2022): 155
- Time zone: UTC+3 (TRT)

Kavakayazma is a village in the Uzunköprü District of Edirne Province in Turkey. Its population is 155 (2022).
