= Gazihalil, Uzunköprü =

Village in Turkey

Gazihalil
- Village
- Location within Turkey Location within Marmara
- Coordinates: 41°03′27″N 26°41′5″E
- Country: Turkey
- Province: Edirne
- District: Uzunköprü
- Population (2022): 167
- Time zone: UTC+3 (TRT)

Gazihalil (formerly: Kadıağılı, Kadıhalil) is a village in the Uzunköprü District of Edirne Province in Turkey. Its population is 167 (2022).
