= Uzunköprü District =

District of Edirne Province, Turkey

- District
- Map showing Uzunköprü District in Edirne Province

- Location in Turkey Uzunköprü District (Marmara)
- Coordinates: 41°16′N 26°41′E
- Country: Turkey
- Province: Edirne
- Seat: Uzunköprü

Government
  - Kaymakam: Ömer Sevgili
- Area: 1,185 km^{2} (458 sq mi)
- Population (2022): 59,351
  - Density: 50/km^{2} (130/sq mi)
- Time zone: UTC+3 (TRT)
- Website: www.uzunkopru.gov.tr

Uzunköprü District is a district of the Edirne Province of Turkey. Its seat is the town of Uzunköprü. Its area is 1,185 km^{2}, and its population is 59,351 (2022).

== Composition ==
There are two municipalities in Uzunköprü District:

- Kırcasalih
- Uzunköprü

There are 53 villages in Uzunköprü District:

- Alıç
- Altınyazı
- Aslıhan
- Balaban
- Balabankoru
- Başağıl
- Bayramlı
- Beykonak
- Bıldır
- Çakmak
- Çalıköy
- Çavuşlu
- Çiftlikköy
- Çobanpınar
- Danişment
- Değirmenci
- Dereköy
- Elmalı
- Eskiköy
- Gazihalil
- Gazimehmet
- Gemici
- Hamidiye
- Hamitli
- Harmanlı
- Hasanpınar
- Kadıköy
- Karabürçek
- Karapınar
- Karayayla
- Kavacık
- Kavakayazma
- Kiremitçisalih
- Kırkkavak
- Kırköy
- Kurdu
- Kurtbey
- Kurttepe
- Maksutlu
- Malkoç
- Meşeli
- Muhacırkadı
- Ömerbey
- Saçlımüsellim
- Salarlı
- Sazlımalkoç
- Sığırcılı
- Sipahi
- Süleymaniye
- Sultanşah
- Türkobası
- Turnacı
- Yağmurca
