= Taşlısekban, Süloğlu =

Village in Turkey

Taşlısekban
- Village
- Location within Turkey Location within Marmara
- Coordinates: 41°48′N 26°53′E
- Country: Turkey
- Province: Edirne
- District: Süloğlu
- Population (2022): 228
- Time zone: UTC+3 (TRT)

Taşlısekban is a village in the Süloğlu District of Edirne Province in Turkey. Its population is 228 (2022).
