= Geçkinli, Süloğlu =

Village in Turkey

Geçkinli
- Village
- Location within Turkey Location within Marmara
- Coordinates: 41°44′N 26°51′E
- Country: Turkey
- Province: Edirne
- District: Süloğlu
- Population (2022): 456
- Time zone: UTC+3 (TRT)

Geçkinli is a village in the Süloğlu District of Edirne Province in Turkey. Its population is 456 (2022).
