= Kiremitçisalih, Uzunköprü =

Village in Turkey

Kiremitçisalih
- Village
- Location within Turkey Location within Marmara
- Coordinates: 41°19′N 26°37′E
- Country: Turkey
- Province: Edirne
- District: Uzunköprü
- Population (2022): 359
- Time zone: UTC+3 (TRT)

Kiremitçisalih is a village in the Uzunköprü District of Edirne Province in Turkey. Its population is 359 (2022).
