= Sultanşah, Uzunköprü =

Village in Turkey

Sultanşah
- Village
- Location within Turkey Location within Marmara
- Coordinates: 41°14′58″N 26°53′14″E
- Country: Turkey
- Province: Edirne
- District: Uzunköprü
- Population (2022): 217
- Time zone: UTC+3 (TRT)

Sultanşah is a village in the Uzunköprü District of Edirne Province in Turkey. Its population is 217 (2022).
