= Alıç, Uzunköprü =

Village in Turkey

Alıç
- Village
- Location within Turkey Location within Marmara
- Coordinates: 41.0617°N 26.6504°E
- Country: Turkey
- Province: Edirne
- District: Uzunköprü
- Population (2022): 212
- Time zone: UTC+3 (TRT)

Alıç is a village in the Uzunköprü District of Edirne Province in Turkey. Its population is 212 (2022).
