= Sülecik, Süloğlu =

Village in Turkey

Sülecik
- Village
- Location within Turkey Location within Marmara
- Coordinates: 41°49′N 26°51′E
- Country: Turkey
- Province: Edirne
- District: Süloğlu
- Population (2022): 146
- Time zone: UTC+3 (TRT)

Sülecik is a village in the Süloğlu District of Edirne Province in Turkey. Its population is 146 (2022).
