= Sazlımalkoç, Uzunköprü =

Village in Turkey

Sazlımalkoç
- Village
- Location within Turkey Location within Marmara
- Coordinates: 41°21′N 26°53′E
- Country: Turkey
- Province: Edirne
- District: Uzunköprü
- Population (2022): 319
- Time zone: UTC+3 (TRT)

Sazlımalkoç is a village in the Uzunköprü District of Edirne Province in Turkey. Its population is 319 (2022).
