= Çömlekakpınar, Lalapaşa =

Village in Turkey

Çömlekakpınar
- Village
- Location within Turkey Location within Marmara
- Coordinates: 41°50′N 26°39′E
- Country: Turkey
- Province: Edirne
- District: Lalapaşa
- Population (2022): 433
- Time zone: UTC+3 (TRT)

Çömlekakpınar is a village in the Lalapaşa District of Edirne Province in Turkey. The village had a population of 433 in 2022.
