= Balabankoru, Uzunköprü =

Village in Turkey

Balabankoru
- Village
- Location in Turkey Balabankoru (Marmara)
- Coordinates: 41°07′N 26°31′E
- Country: Turkey
- Province: Edirne
- District: Uzunköprü
- Population (2022): 370
- Time zone: UTC+3 (TRT)

Balabankoru is a village in the Uzunköprü District of Edirne Province in Turkey. Its population is 370 (2022).
