= Çavuşlu, Uzunköprü =

Village in Turkey

Çavuşlu
- Village
- Location within Turkey Location within Marmara
- Coordinates: 41.0802°N 26.7769°E
- Country: Turkey
- Province: Edirne
- District: Uzunköprü
- Population (2022): 353
- Time zone: UTC+3 (TRT)

Çavuşlu is a village in the Uzunköprü District of Edirne Province in Turkey. Its population is 353 (2022).
