= Saçlımüsellim, Uzunköprü =

Village in Turkey

Saçlımüsellim
- Village
- Location within Turkey Location within Marmara
- Coordinates: 41°25′N 26°38′E
- Country: Turkey
- Province: Edirne
- District: Uzunköprü
- Population (2022): 95
- Time zone: UTC+3 (TRT)

Saçlımüsellim is a village in the Uzunköprü District of Edirne Province in Turkey. Its population is 95 (2022).
