= Çatma, Lalapaşa =

Village in Turkey

Çatma
- Village
- Location within Turkey Location within Marmara
- Country: Turkey
- Province: Edirne
- District: Lalapaşa
- Population (2022): 48
- Time zone: UTC+3 (TRT)

Çatma is a village in the Lalapaşa District of Edirne Province in Turkey. The village had a population of 48 in 2022.
