= Küküler, Süloğlu =

Village in Turkey

Küküler
- Village
- Location within Turkey Location within Marmara
- Coordinates: 41°43′N 26°54′E
- Country: Turkey
- Province: Edirne
- District: Süloğlu
- Population (2022): 145
- Time zone: UTC+3 (TRT)

Küküler is a village in the Süloğlu District of Edirne Province in Turkey. Its population is 145 (2022).
