= Kadıköy, Uzunköprü =

Village in Turkey

Kadıköy
- Village
- Location within Turkey Location within Marmara
- Coordinates: 41.087°N 26.677°E
- Country: Turkey
- Province: Edirne
- District: Uzunköprü
- Population (2022): 160
- Time zone: UTC+3 (TRT)

Kadıköy is a village in the Uzunköprü District of Edirne Province in Turkey. Its population is 160 (2022).
