= Salarlı, Uzunköprü =

Village in Turkey

Salarlı
- Village
- Location within Turkey Location within Marmara
- Country: Turkey
- Province: Edirne
- District: Uzunköprü
- Population (2022): 656
- Time zone: UTC+3 (TRT)

Salarlı is a village in the Uzunköprü District of Edirne Province in Turkey. Its population is 656 (2022).
