= Kurdu, Uzunköprü =

Village in Turkey

Kurdu
- Village
- Location within Turkey Location within Marmara
- Coordinates: 41°18′N 26°34′E
- Country: Turkey
- Province: Edirne
- District: Uzunköprü
- Population (2022): 198
- Time zone: UTC+3 (TRT)

Kurdu is a village in the Uzunköprü District of Edirne Province in Turkey. Its population is 198 (2022).
