= Turnacı, Uzunköprü =

Village in Turkey

Turnacı
- Village
- Location within Turkey Location within Marmara
- Coordinates: 41°15′N 26°56′E
- Country: Turkey
- Province: Edirne
- District: Uzunköprü
- Population (2022): 240
- Time zone: UTC+3 (TRT)

Turnacı is a village in the Uzunköprü District of Edirne Province in Turkey. Its population is 240 (2022).
