= Akardere, Süloğlu =

Village in Turkey

Akardere
- Village
- Location within Turkey Location within Marmara
- Coordinates: 41°41′N 26°56′E
- Country: Turkey
- Province: Edirne
- District: Süloğlu
- Population (2022): 396
- Time zone: UTC+3 (TRT)

Akardere is a village in the Süloğlu District of Edirne Province in Turkey. Its population is 396 (2022).
