= Başağıl, Uzunköprü =

Village in Turkey

Başağıl
- Village
- Location within Turkey Location within Marmara
- Coordinates: 41.2662°N 26.7983°E
- Country: Turkey
- Province: Edirne
- District: Uzunköprü
- Population (2022): 311
- Time zone: UTC+3 (TRT)

Başağıl is a village in the Uzunköprü District of Edirne Province in Turkey. Its population is 310 (2022).
