= Domurcalı, Süloğlu =

Village in Turkey

Domurcalı
- Village
- Location within Turkey Location within Marmara
- Coordinates: 41°48′54″N 26°49′12″E
- Country: Turkey
- Province: Edirne
- District: Süloğlu
- Population (2022): 213
- Time zone: UTC+3 (TRT)

Domurcalı is a village in the Süloğlu District of Edirne Province in Turkey. Its population is 213 (2022).
