= Sipahi, Uzunköprü =

Village in Turkey

Sipahi
- Village
- Location within Turkey Location within Marmara
- Coordinates: 41°13′41″N 26°53′31″E
- Country: Turkey
- Province: Edirne
- District: Uzunköprü
- Population (2022): 302
- Time zone: UTC+3 (TRT)

Sipahi is a village in the Uzunköprü District of Edirne Province in Turkey. Its population is 302 (2022).
