= Çalıköy, Uzunköprü =

Village in Turkey

Çalıköy
- Village
- Location within Turkey Location within Marmara
- Country: Turkey
- Province: Edirne
- District: Uzunköprü
- Population (2022): 245
- Time zone: UTC+3 (TRT)

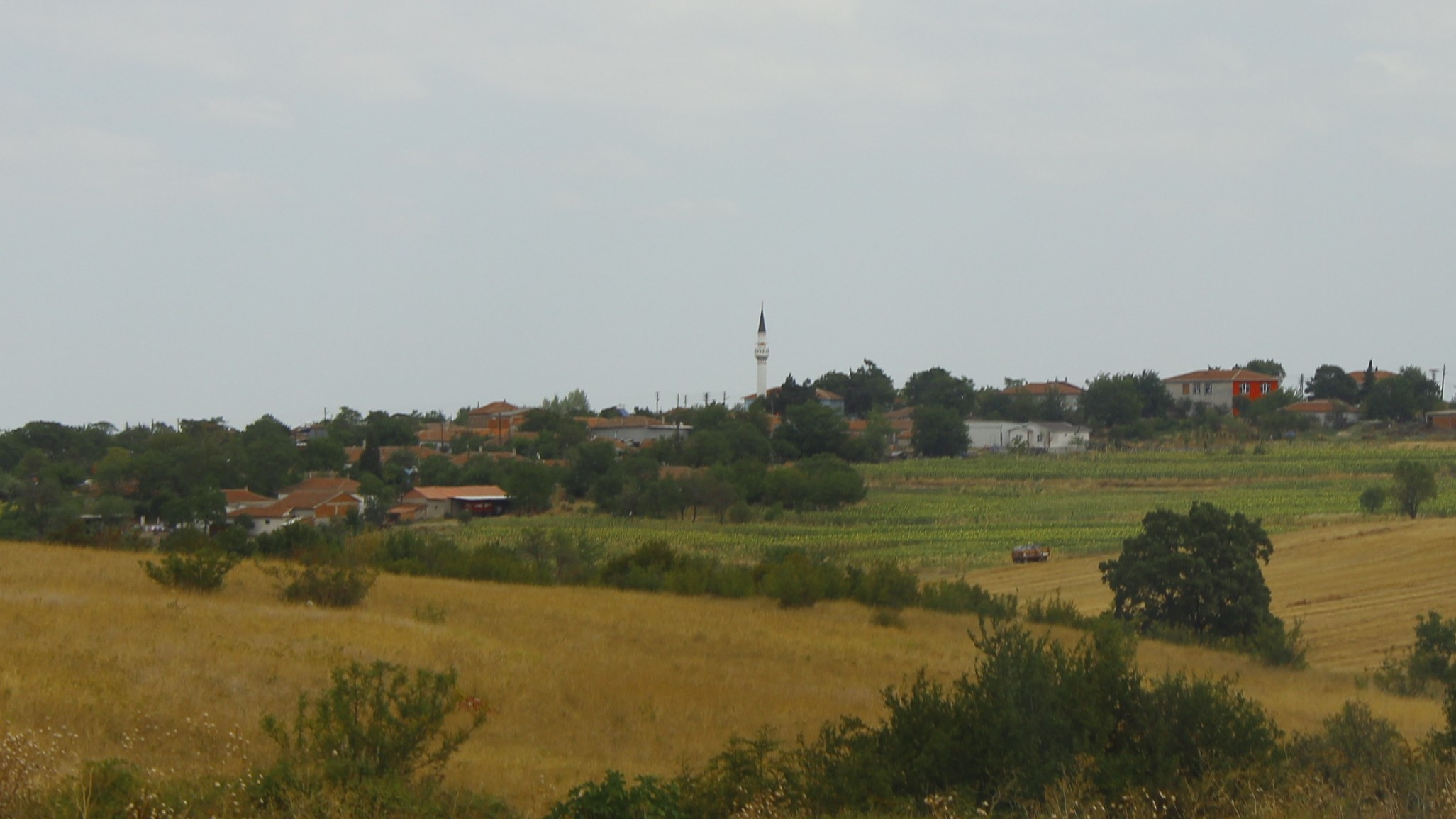
Çaliköy in 2023

Çalıköy is a village in the Uzunköprü District of Edirne Province in Turkey. Its population is 245 (2022).
