= Hacılar, Lalapaşa =

Village in Turkey

Hacılar
- Village
- Location within Turkey Location within Marmara
- Coordinates: 41.94267°N 26.78268°E
- Country: Turkey
- Province: Edirne
- District: Lalapaşa
- Population (2022): 59
- Time zone: UTC+3 (TRT)

Hacılar is a village in the Lalapaşa District of Edirne Province in Turkey. The village had a population of 59 in 2022.
