= Aslıhan, Uzunköprü =

Village in Turkey

Aslıhan
- Village
- Location within Turkey Location within Marmara
- Coordinates: 41.4118°N 26.7957°E
- Country: Turkey
- Province: Edirne
- District: Uzunköprü
- Population (2022): 483
- Time zone: UTC+3 (TRT)

Aslıhan is a village in the Uzunköprü District of Edirne Province in Turkey. Its population is 483 (2022).
