= Bıldır, Uzunköprü =

Village in Turkey

Bıldır
- Village
- Location within Turkey Location within Marmara
- Coordinates: 41°17′15″N 26°53′32″E
- Country: Turkey
- Province: Edirne
- District: Uzunköprü
- Population (2022): 152
- Time zone: UTC+3 (TRT)

Bıldır is a village in the Uzunköprü District of Edirne Province in Turkey. Its population is 152 (2022).
