= Muhacırkadı, Uzunköprü =

Village in Turkey

Muhacırkadı
- Village
- Location within Turkey Location within Marmara
- Coordinates: 41°20′N 26°53′E
- Country: Turkey
- Province: Edirne
- District: Uzunköprü
- Population (2022): 238
- Time zone: UTC+3 (TRT)

Muhacırkadı (also: Muhacirkadı) is a village in the Uzunköprü District of Edirne Province in Turkey. Its population is 238 (2022).
