= Malkoç, Uzunköprü =

Village in Turkey

Malkoç
- Village
- Location within Turkey Location within Marmara
- Coordinates: 41°16′N 26°46′E
- Country: Turkey
- Province: Edirne
- District: Uzunköprü
- Population (2022): 340
- Time zone: UTC+3 (TRT)

Malkoç (also: Malkoçköy) is a village in the Uzunköprü District of Edirne Province in Turkey. Its population is 340 (2022).
