= Gazimehmet, Uzunköprü =

Village in Turkey

Gazimehmet
- Village
- Location within Turkey Location within Marmara
- Coordinates: 41°12′N 26°55′E
- Country: Turkey
- Province: Edirne
- District: Uzunköprü
- Population (2022): 260
- Time zone: UTC+3 (TRT)

Gazimehmet is a village in the Uzunköprü District of Edirne Province in Turkey. Its population is 260 (2022).
