= Çakmak, Uzunköprü =

Village in Turkey

Çakmak
- Village
- Location within Turkey Location within Marmara
- Country: Turkey
- Province: Edirne
- District: Uzunköprü
- Population (2022): 239
- Time zone: UTC+3 (TRT)

Çakmak (also: Çakmakköy) is a village in the Uzunköprü District of Edirne Province in Turkey. Its population is 239 (2022).
