= Kırköy, Uzunköprü =

Village in Turkey

Kırköy
- Village
- Location within Turkey Location within Marmara
- Coordinates: 41.1058°N 26.7222°E
- Country: Turkey
- Province: Edirne
- District: Uzunköprü
- Population (2022): 241
- Time zone: UTC+3 (TRT)

Kırköy is a village in the Uzunköprü District of Edirne Province in Turkey. Its population is 241 (2022).
