= Büyük Gerdelli, Süloğlu =

Village in Turkey

Büyük Gerdelli
- Village
- Location within Turkey Location within Marmara
- Coordinates: 41.7363°N 26.9496°E
- Country: Turkey
- Province: Edirne
- District: Süloğlu
- Population (2022): 703
- Time zone: UTC+3 (TRT)

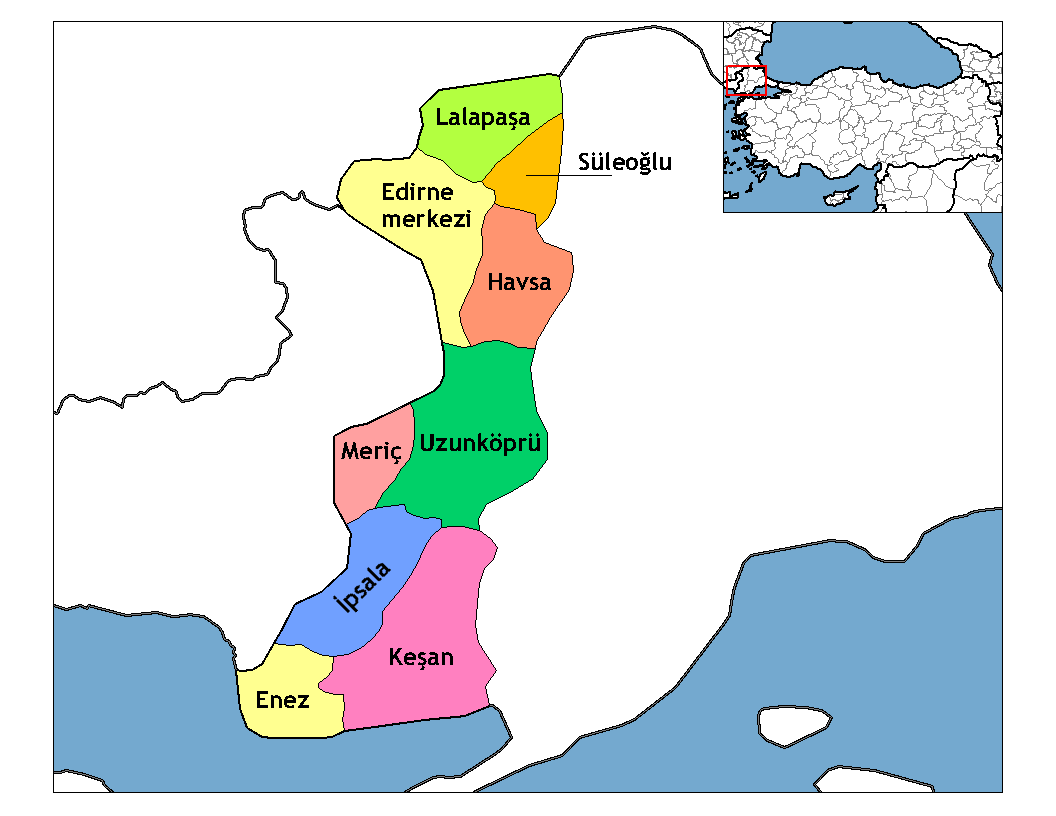
Districts of Edirne province in Turkey

Büyük Gerdelli is a village in the Süloğlu District of Edirne Province in Turkey. Its population is 703 (2022).
