= Balaban, Uzunköprü =

Village in Turkey

Balaban
- Village
- Location within Turkey Location within Marmara
- Coordinates: 41.089167°N 26.548333°E
- Country: Turkey
- Province: Edirne
- District: Uzunköprü
- Population (2022): 308
- Time zone: UTC+3 (TRT)

Balaban is a village in the Uzunköprü District of Edirne Province in Turkey. Its population is 308 (2022).
