= Sığırcılı, Uzunköprü =

Village in Turkey

Sığırcılı
- Village
- Location within Turkey Location within Marmara
- Coordinates: 41.4108°N 26.6485°E
- Country: Turkey
- Province: Edirne
- District: Uzunköprü
- Population (2022): 205
- Time zone: UTC+3 (TRT)

Sığırcılı is a village in the Uzunköprü District of Edirne Province in north west of Turkey near Greece. Its population is 205 (2022).
