= Doğanköy, Lalapaşa =

Village in Turkey

Doğanköy
- Village
- Location within Turkey Location within Marmara
- Coordinates: 41°55′39″N 26°42′03″E
- Country: Turkey
- Province: Edirne
- District: Lalapaşa
- Population (2022): 100
- Time zone: UTC+3 (TRT)

Doğanköy is a village in the Lalapaşa District of Edirne Province in Turkey. The village had a population of 100 in 2022.
