= Tatarlar, Süloğlu =

Village in Turkey

Tatarlar
- Village
- Location within Turkey Location within Marmara
- Country: Turkey
- Province: Edirne
- District: Süloğlu
- Population (2022): 301
- Time zone: UTC+3 (TRT)

Tatarlar is a village in the Süloğlu District of Edirne Province in Turkey. Its population is 301 (2022).

== Population ==
Historical population
Year	Pop.	±% p.a.
2007	401	—
2012	388	−0.66%
2017	324	−3.54%
2022	301	−1.46%
Source: TÜIK (2007-2022)
