= Tatalılar =

- Municipality
- Location within Azerbaijan
- Coordinates: 39°51′49″N 47°35′21″E
- Country: Azerbaijan
- Rayon: Beylagan

Population
  - Total: 2,083
- Time zone: UTC+4 (AZT)
  - Summer (DST): UTC+5 (AZT)

Tatalılar (also, Tatalylar, Tatarlar, and Titilyar) is a village and municipality in the Beylagan Rayon of Azerbaijan. It has a population of 2,083.
