= Hasırcıarnavutköy, Meriç =

Village in Turkey

Hasırcıarnavutköy
- Village
- Location within Turkey Location within Marmara
- Coordinates: 41°16′21″N 26°27′39″E
- Country: Turkey
- Province: Edirne
- District: Meriç
- Population (2022): 366
- Time zone: UTC+3 (TRT)

Hasırcıarnavutköy (also: Hasırcıarnavut) is a village in the Meriç District of Edirne Province in Turkey. The village had a population of 366 in 2022.
