= Süloğlu =

- Municipality
- Location in Turkey Süloğlu (Marmara)
- Coordinates: 41°46′8″N 26°54′37″E
- Country: Turkey
- Province: Edirne
- District: Süloğlu

Government
  - Mayor: Mehmet Ormankıran (CHP)
- Elevation: 72 m (236 ft)
- Population (2022): 3,211
- Time zone: UTC+3 (TRT)
- Postal code: 22580
- Area code: 0284
- Website: www.suloglu.bel.tr

Süloğlu (Turkish: [ˈsyɫoːɫu]; Greek: Ασβεστοχώρι Asvestochṓri) is a town of Edirne Province of Turkey. It is the seat of Süloğlu District. Its population is 3,211 (2022). The mayor is Mehmet Ormankıran (CHP).

== History ==
After the Turkish War of Independence, Süloğlu became a part of Turkey in 1922. The town was a part of the Edirne District until 1990, when the Süloğlu District was established.

== Geography ==
The town is located 33 kilometers from the city of Edirne and 232 kilometers from Istanbul.
