= Ergene =

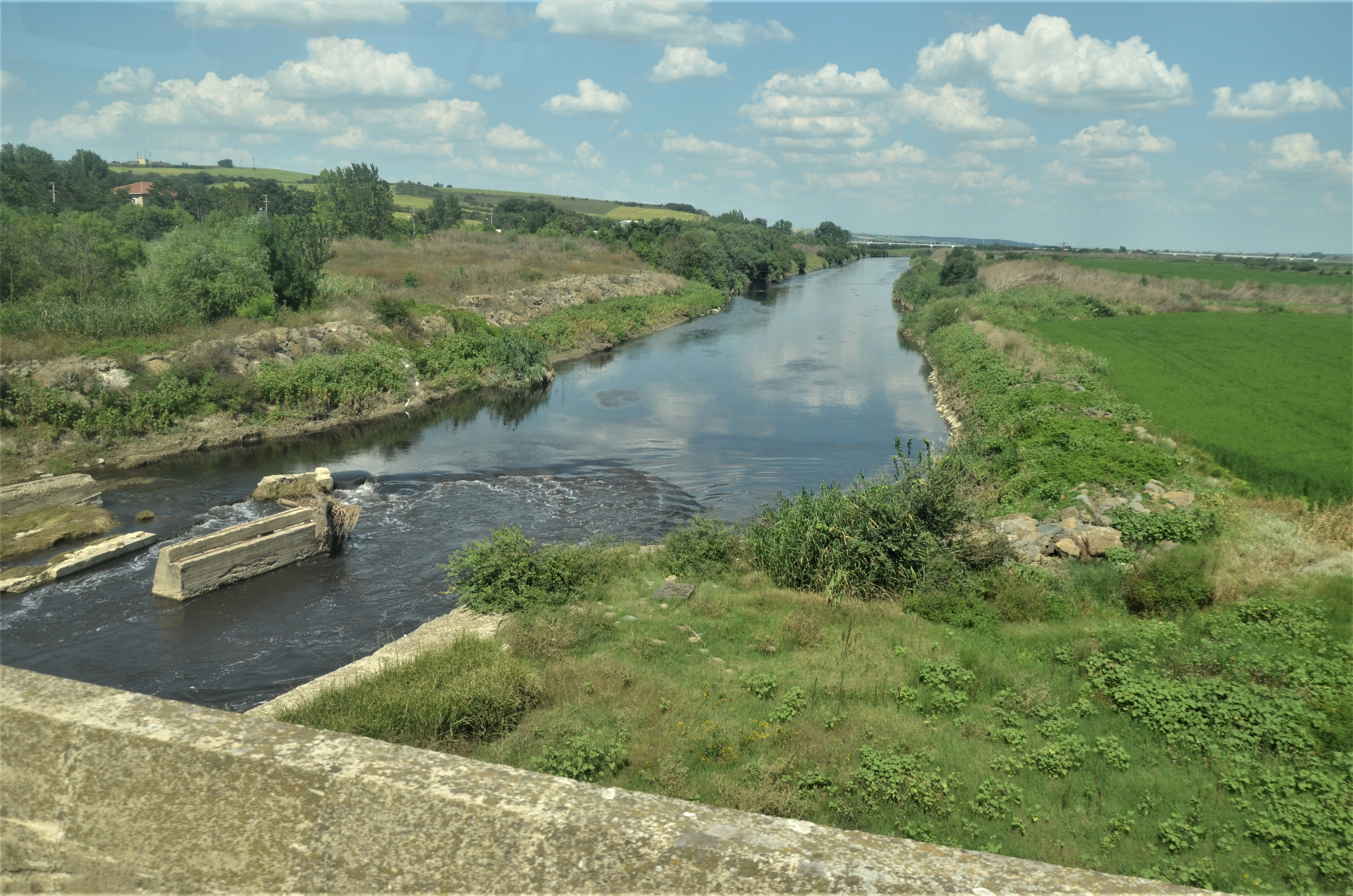

Location
- Country: Turkey
- State: Thrace
- Region: Marmara region
- Cities: Çerkezköy, Çorlu, Muratlı, Lüleburgaz, Alpullu, Pehlivanköy, Uzunköprü

Physical characteristics
- Mouth: Maritsa
  - coordinates: 41.0261°N 26.3603°E

Basin features
- Progression: Maritsa→ Aegean Sea
- Tributaries
  - left: Hayrabolu creek
  - right: Çorlu creek, Lüleburgaz creek, Sulucak creek, Teke creek, Babaeski creek

Ergene (Turkish: Ergene Nehri; Greek: Εργίνης; Eryinis, Ancient Greek: Ἀγριάνης, Agriánēs) is a major left tributary of the Maritsa (Meriç) river, flowing entirely in the East Thrace region of Turkey.

The river rises from the southern part of Strandzha mountain, not far from the Black Sea and flows for 281 km before entering the Maritsa near the Turkish city of İpsala, with part of its lower course canalized. Its drainage basin has an area of 11,016 km^{2}.

Major settlements along the river include Uzunköprü, Pehlivanköy, Çerkezköy and Muratlı.
