= Yünlüce, Lalapaşa =

Village in Turkey

Yünlüce
- Village
- Location within Turkey Location within Marmara
- Coordinates: 41°51′9″N 26°38′0″E
- Country: Turkey
- Province: Edirne
- District: Lalapaşa
- Population (2022): 78
- Time zone: UTC+3 (TRT)

Yünlüce is a village in the Lalapaşa District of Edirne Province in Turkey. The village had a population of 78 in 2022.
