= Lalapaşa District =

District of Edirne Province, Turkey

- District
- Map showing Lalapaşa District in Edirne Province

- Location in Turkey Lalapaşa District (Marmara)
- Coordinates: 41°50′N 26°44′E
- Country: Turkey
- Province: Edirne
- Seat: Lalapaşa

Government
  - Kaymakam: Ömer Bulut
- Area: 497 km^{2} (192 sq mi)
- Population (2022): 6,225
  - Density: 13/km^{2} (32/sq mi)
- Time zone: UTC+3 (TRT)
- Website: www.lalapasa.gov.tr

Lalapaşa District is a district of the Edirne Province of Turkey. Its seat is the town of Lalapaşa. Its area is 497 km^{2}, and its population is 6,225 (2022).

== Composition ==
There is one municipality in Lalapaşa District:

- Lalapaşa

There are 27 villages in Lalapaşa District:

- Büyünlü
- Çallıdere
- Çatma
- Çömlek
- Çömlekakpınar
- Demirköy
- Doğanköy
- Dombay
- Hacıdanişment
- Hacılar
- Hamzabeyli
- Hanlıyenice
- Hüseyinpınar
- Kalkansöğüt
- Kavaklı
- Küçünlü
- Ömeroba
- Ortakçı
- Saksağan
- Sarıdanişment
- Sinanköy
- Süleymandanişment
- Taşlımüsellim
- Tuğlalık
- Uzunbayır
- Vaysal
- Yünlüce
