= Uzunköprü =

- Municipality
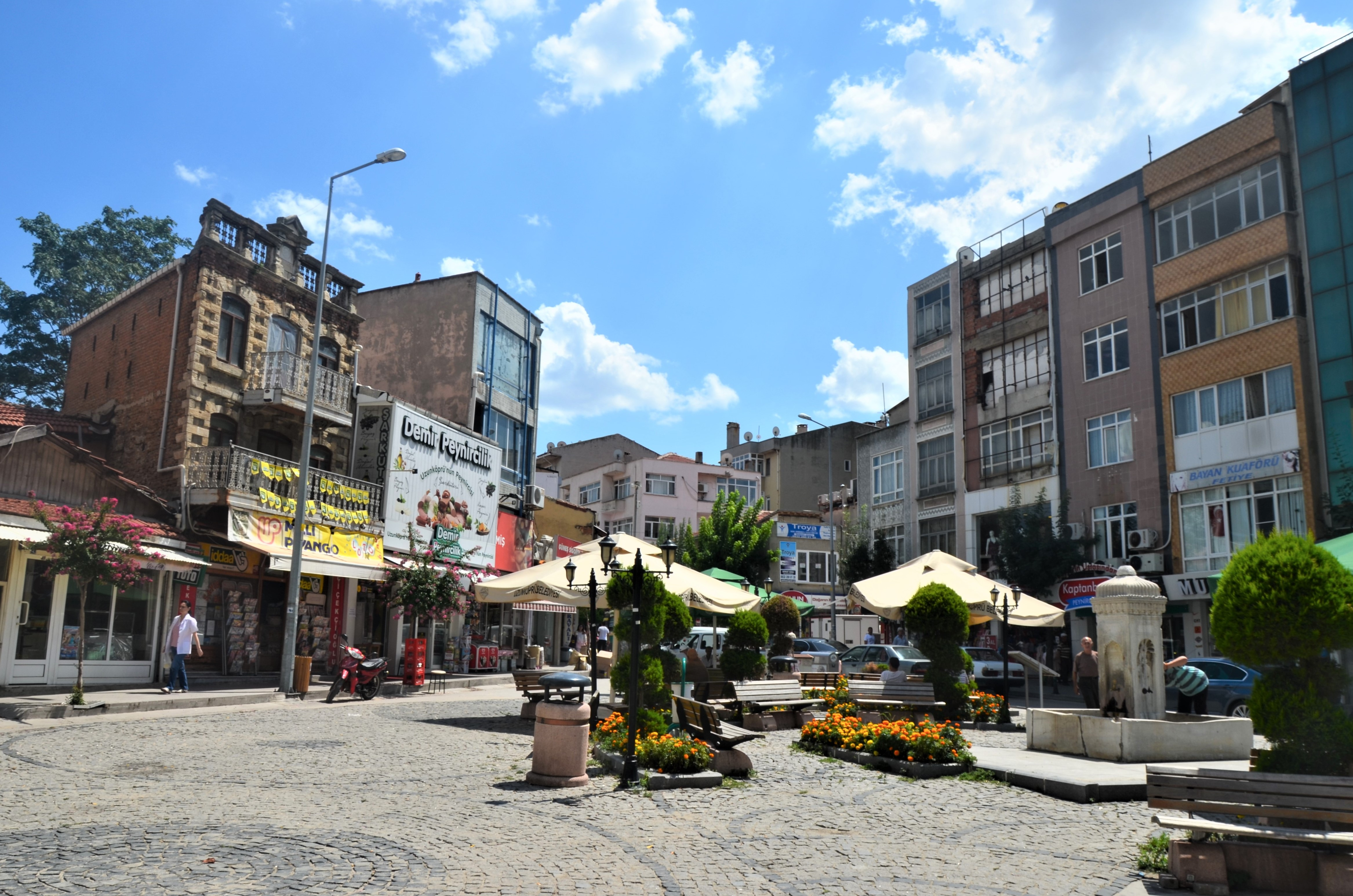
- New Market (Yeni Pazar) in Uzunköprü.

- Logo

- Location within Turkey Location within Marmara
- Coordinates: 41°16′01″N 26°41′15″E
- Country: Turkey
- Province: Edirne
- District: Uzunköprü

Government
  - Mayor: Ediz Martin (CHP)
- Elevation: 10 m (33 ft)
- Population (2022): 39,577
- Time zone: UTC+3 (TRT)
- Postal code: 22300
- Area code: 0284
- Website: uzunkopru.bel.tr

Uzunköprü is a town in Edirne Province in Turkey. It is named after a historical stone bridge, claimed to be the world's longest, on the Ergene River. It is a strategically important border town, located on the routes connecting Turkey to the Balkans and Europe. It is the seat of Uzunköprü District. Its population is 39,577 (2022). Uzunköprü is the third most populous town of Edirne Province.

The town is served by Uzunköprü railway station.

== History ==
The history of Uzunköprü goes back to the Neolithic Era (8000–5500). In the field surveys conducted in Maslıdere, situated along the route going to Kırkkavak village to the south, many ware fragments overlaid with ornamental striped and pressed figures have been discovered with designs that have never been encountered in Greece and Bulgaria. Nevertheless, the information about this era is inadequate because the researches haven't been taken further. In addition, the history of the region from these ages to the 15th century BC is still unknown, so the previous claims do not stand.

In 15th century BC the land began to be settled by the Thracians and they had become tho sole owner of the place for a long time. However, after the 7th century BC the Thracian domination came to end by the continuous invasions over the years and got into the hands sequentially of Greeks, Persians, Romans and Byzantines.

The ancient Christian church held a bishopric see under the name of Pamphilon.

Although the region has a very old past, a city had never been able to be built on the area where today's Uzunkopru exists because it'd been covered with vast swamps and dense forests till the Ottomans. That's why, the closest city to today's settlement built in the region is Plotinopolis, established by the Roman Emperor Trajan (AD 53–117) on the banks of the Maritsa River between Uzunkopru and Didymoteicho in Greek Thrace, that was named after Trajan's wife Pompeia Plotina and became a bishopric, suffragan of Adrianople. This ancient city is also called Old Uzunkopru. Eventually, the region was captured from the Byzantine Empire after the Ottoman conquest of Adrianople (which became renamed Edirne) in the 1360s, and only afterwards it could be possible for Uzunkopru city to be established.

Uzunköprü is the first Turkish city established in Rumelia by the Ottoman Empire. It was founded by Great Sultan Murad II in 1427 under the name of Ergene City. The establishment of the city is the result of both the necessity of a settlement place acting as a junction point on the ways connecting the Ottoman capital Edirne to Gallipoli and the Balkans and secondly taking16 years to build the Long Bridge over the Ergene River. Murad II decided to build a stone bridge over the Ergene River when his army couldn't pass the river during a campaign against Gallipoli because of the flood caused by the heavy rain at that time and collapse of the temporary wooden bridges easily. The first 360- arched stone bridge built between 1424 and 1427 wasn't found satisfactory, thereby destructed and rebuilt by Murad II. It is that second bridge existing in the city today. The construction of this second bridge had lasted from 1427 to 1443 and could be finished in 16 years. Due to the long-lasting works, the meeting of the needs of the workers and the soldiers protecting them and the area became indispensably necessary and had to be built a mosque, public kitchen, caravanserai, medrese, hammam and two water mills as facilities besides. Subsequently, families from firstly Edirne and later the Turkoman tribes who had passed onto Rumelia was brought and settled in the region to maintain and develop those facilities, thus it was laid the foundations of the city. This very first settlement called as Cisr-i Ergene (Ergene Bridge) had immediately become the trade route of the merchants carrying goods from Edirne to Gallipoli overland for shipping to Europe, Egypt and Syria, and flourished rapidly. In the beginning of 20th century the small town had a mixed population of Turks, Bulgarians, Greeks, Orthodox Albanians, Armenians, Jews, Gypsies etc. In 1913 Turks uprooted 300 Bulgarian families, and till 1922 evicted all Greeks, Orthodox Albanians, Armenians etc.

Uzunköprü remained under Turkish sovereignty uninterruptedly till the 19th century. However, in the following years it had been occupied four times up to the dissolution of the Ottoman Empire: by Russia twice, from 20 August to 20 November 1829 and 21 January 1878 to 13 March 1879; by Bulgaria, from 2 November 1912 to 19 July 1913 and lastly by Greece, from 25 July 1920 to 18 November 1922. In the last occupation the Greeks renamed Uzunköprü Makrifere. The city regained its present name after being reconquered by the Turks on 18 November 1922. Eventually, Uzunköprü was left in Turkey in the Lausanne Treaty signed after the Turkish War of Independence with the Allied Powers with which the Maritsa River became the border between Turkey and Greece. Today, 18 November is celebrated as Uzunköprü's Independence Day to commemorate the liberation from the Greek occupation.

== Geography ==
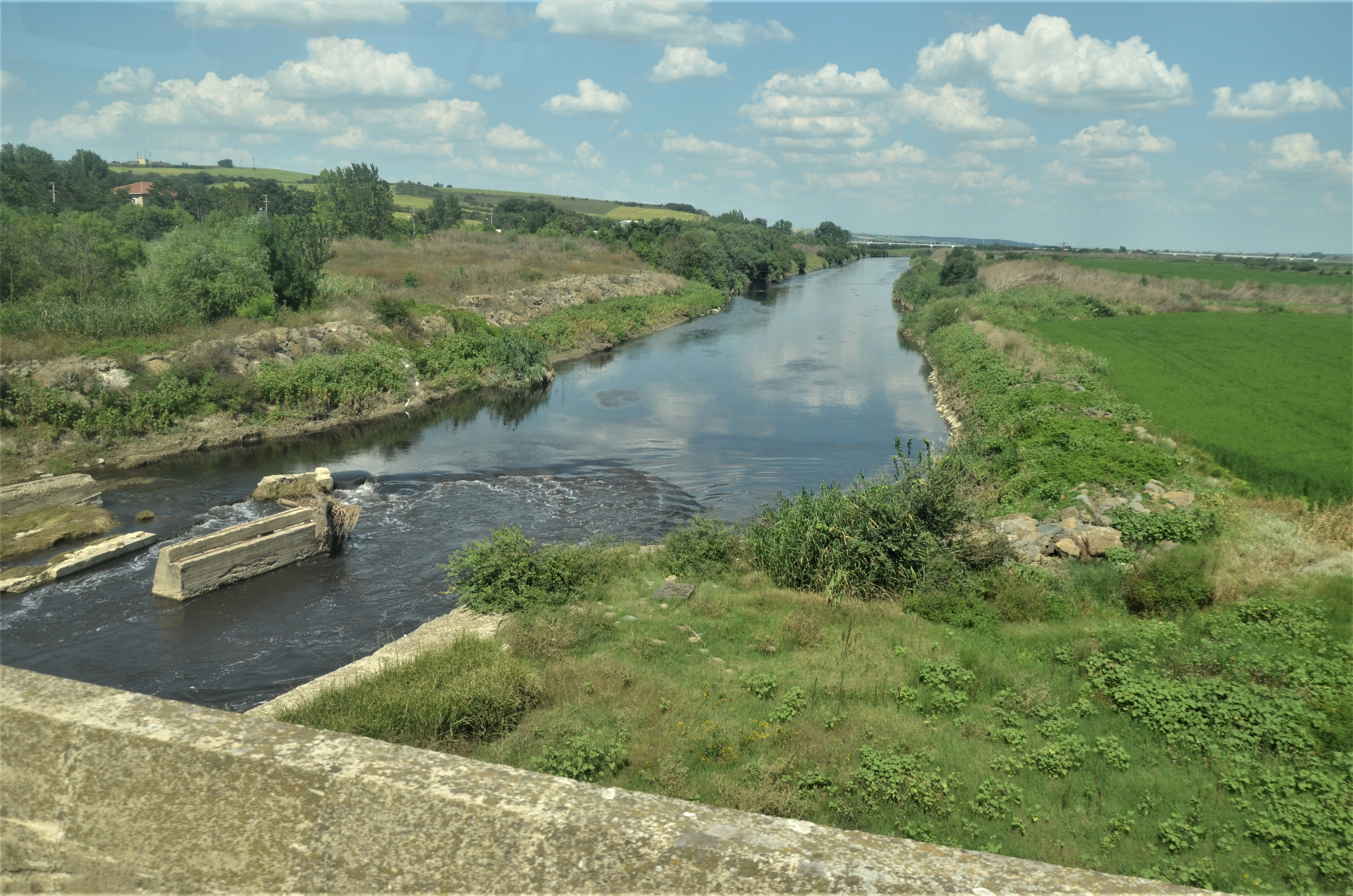
Ergene River upstream seen from the Uzun köprü (The Long Bridge).

Uzunköprü city is located at the westernmost border of Turkey and in the middle of Edirne province. It is bordered by Greece and Meric town to the west, Tekirdag to the east, Kırklareli to the northeast, Ipsala and Kesan to the South, Edirne city and Havsa to the North. Because it was established on Ergene Plain, almost 75% of the city's territory is made up of low-lying areas that has an elevation of 18 m. Small hills and plateaus scattered especially to the north and the south from place to place form the sole heights encountered in the region. The highest point of the city is Suleymaniye Hill with a 221 m (725 ft) height.

Uzunköprü's weather is under the influence of severe Thracian Transitional Type of the Mediterranean climate which is a mixture of continental and maritime climates. The winds generally blow from the north with medium speed. While summers are hot and near-rainless, winters pass cold and precipitation often takes the form of snow. Most of the rain falls in the spring. Although the city has a semi-humid climate, its flora is steppe. As 70% of the unbuilt area is composed of arable soils that's allocated to cultivation, 20% of the rest is meadows and pastures, and 10% is forests and shrubland. The amount of the forestland has started to increase in the last years in result of the afforestation works.

Climate data for Uzunköprü (1991–2020)
| Month | Jan | Feb | Mar | Apr | May | Jun | Jul | Aug | Sep | Oct | Nov | Dec | Year |
|---|---|---|---|---|---|---|---|---|---|---|---|---|---|
| Mean daily maximum °C (°F) | 7.5 (45.5) | 10.1 (50.2) | 13.7 (56.7) | 19.1 (66.4) | 25.0 (77.0) | 30.0 (86.0) | 32.7 (90.9) | 32.9 (91.2) | 27.8 (82.0) | 21.0 (69.8) | 14.8 (58.6) | 9.0 (48.2) | 20.3 (68.5) |
| Daily mean °C (°F) | 3.1 (37.6) | 4.9 (40.8) | 8.1 (46.6) | 12.6 (54.7) | 17.9 (64.2) | 22.5 (72.5) | 24.9 (76.8) | 25.0 (77.0) | 20.3 (68.5) | 14.8 (58.6) | 9.5 (49.1) | 4.8 (40.6) | 14.1 (57.4) |
| Mean daily minimum °C (°F) | −0.6 (30.9) | 0.6 (33.1) | 3.2 (37.8) | 6.6 (43.9) | 11.2 (52.2) | 15.3 (59.5) | 17.1 (62.8) | 17.3 (63.1) | 13.4 (56.1) | 9.4 (48.9) | 5.1 (41.2) | 1.1 (34.0) | 8.3 (46.9) |
| Average precipitation mm (inches) | 71.29 (2.81) | 66.16 (2.60) | 73.75 (2.90) | 44.12 (1.74) | 46.09 (1.81) | 35.41 (1.39) | 32.69 (1.29) | 17.15 (0.68) | 35.31 (1.39) | 70.9 (2.79) | 74.51 (2.93) | 79.72 (3.14) | 647.1 (25.48) |
| Average precipitation days (≥ 1.0 mm) | 7.6 | 6.8 | 7.2 | 5.7 | 5.4 | 5.0 | 3.4 | 2.3 | 3.8 | 5.1 | 5.6 | 8.1 | 66.0 |
| Average relative humidity (%) | 82.1 | 78.4 | 75.8 | 71.4 | 67.3 | 63.5 | 59.7 | 59.5 | 65.7 | 74.6 | 79.8 | 82.3 | 71.7 |
Source: NOAA

== The Long Bridge, Uzunköprü ==
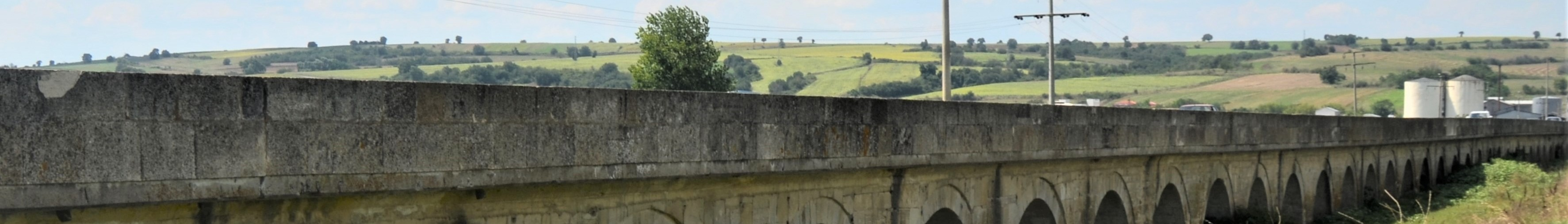
Uzun köprü (The Long Bridge)

Uzunköprü is the longest historical stone bridge of the world, and gives its name to Uzunköprü town. It was built by head architect Muslihiddin between 1427–1443 to span the Ergene river with the order of Sultan Murad II and brought into use with a ceremony attended by the Sultan himself in 1444. It's been located on a militarily and commercially highly strategic point connecting the capital Edirne to Galipoli and the Western Rumelia.

The bridge was built of binding ashlar blocks brought from the quarries in Yagmurca, Eskikoy and Hasırcıarnavut villages, to each other with Horasan cement. The construction process was supervised firstly by Ghazi Mahmud Bey and after his death by Ishak Bey. Although today its length is 1238.55 m (4063 ft) from the first arch to the last, its original length used to be 1392 m (4566 ft) with extended wings that don't exist today. The reason of why it was built this long was that the region used to be covered with vast swamps in that period. In addition, because the Ergene River causes flood in rainy season, the arches over the river were built high and opened seven bleed ports in them to prevent the bridge from collapse. The wings and arches of the bridge which has 13.56 m (44.48 ft) height, are embellished with several lion, elephant, bird, eagle, tulip and geometric relief motifs.

Because it has been through a lot of flood and earthquake disasters since the construction, the bridge underwent many restorations during the tenures of Sultan Mehmet the Conqueror, Osman II, Mahmud II and Abdulhamid II to repair the damages. In the final restoration made between 1964 and 1971 in the Republic period, its width was increased from 5.24 m (17.19 ft) to 6.80 m (22.3 ft) by widening from the both sides and lost its originality. In addition, the initial arch number of 174 reduced to 172 after one of them collapsed in time and two of them were united as one. However, with a new restoration and rehabilitation work thought to be performed, the bridge was planned to return to its original form and get pedestrianized.

- Media related to Uzun köprü at Wikimedia Commons

== Other sights ==
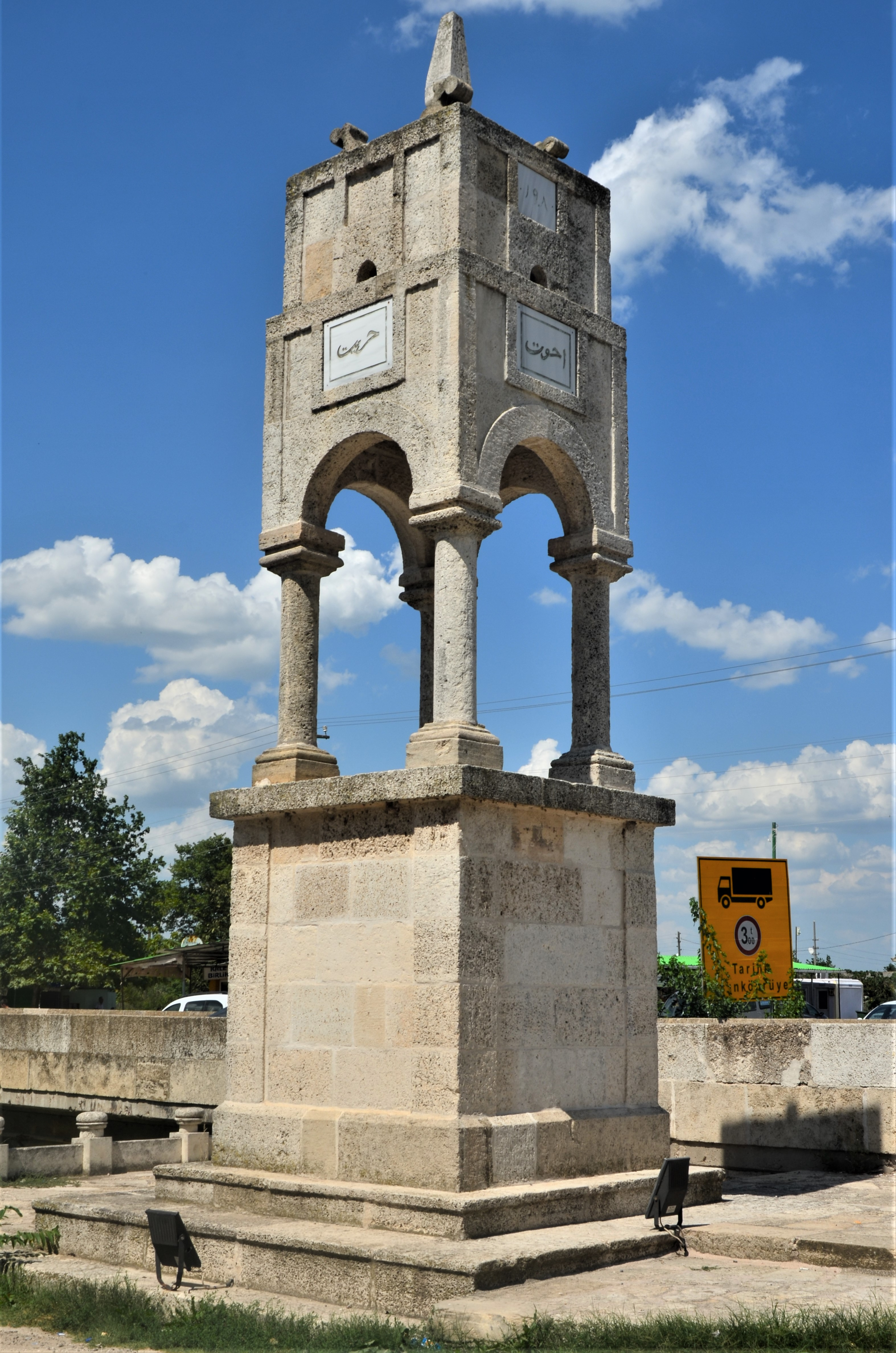
Monument of Liberty (Özgürlük Anıtı)

=== The Monument of Liberty (Liberty Fountain) ===
It is the democracy monument erected in memory of the reenactment of the Ottoman Constitution that's one of the milestones of the history of the Turkish democracy. With the re-declaration of the Constitution ( Kanun-i Esasi) on 23 July 1908, the Ottoman Empire's regime was changed from absolute monarchy to parliamentary regime and started an unprecedented era of freedom in the whole Empire. Uzunkopru didn't stay idle to these new political changes and the Liberty Monument was erected at the right side of the bridge's entry in such a political atmosphere to celebrate this great event with the contributions of the District Governor and Ottoman intellectual Mazhar Müfit Kansu and the Mayor Hafiz Ismail Yayalar on 11 December 1908.

Measuring 6 m (20 ft) in height, the monument was placed on a 2 m^{2} (22 sq ft) pedestal. Although in its initial form, there were two fountains as one on the front for people and the other on the left for animals, these fountains were removed and covered up in 1938. The four themes of liberty, equality, fraternity and justice were written in Arabic text on the markers and put atop of the first liberty monument of the Turkish history on the four sides. However, the original markers were lost while the monument was being moved to 1 m (3 ft 3 in) left of its primary place during the bridge restoration in 1964 and haven't been able to be found so far. The markers existing on the monument today are the replicas of their genuines. The Monument of Liberty was saved from oblivion with a complete restoration and opened to public just 104 years after it was built on 11 December 2012.

Media related to Monument of Liberty, Uzunköprü at Wikimedia Commons

=== The Mosque of Murad II (Muradiye Mosque) ===
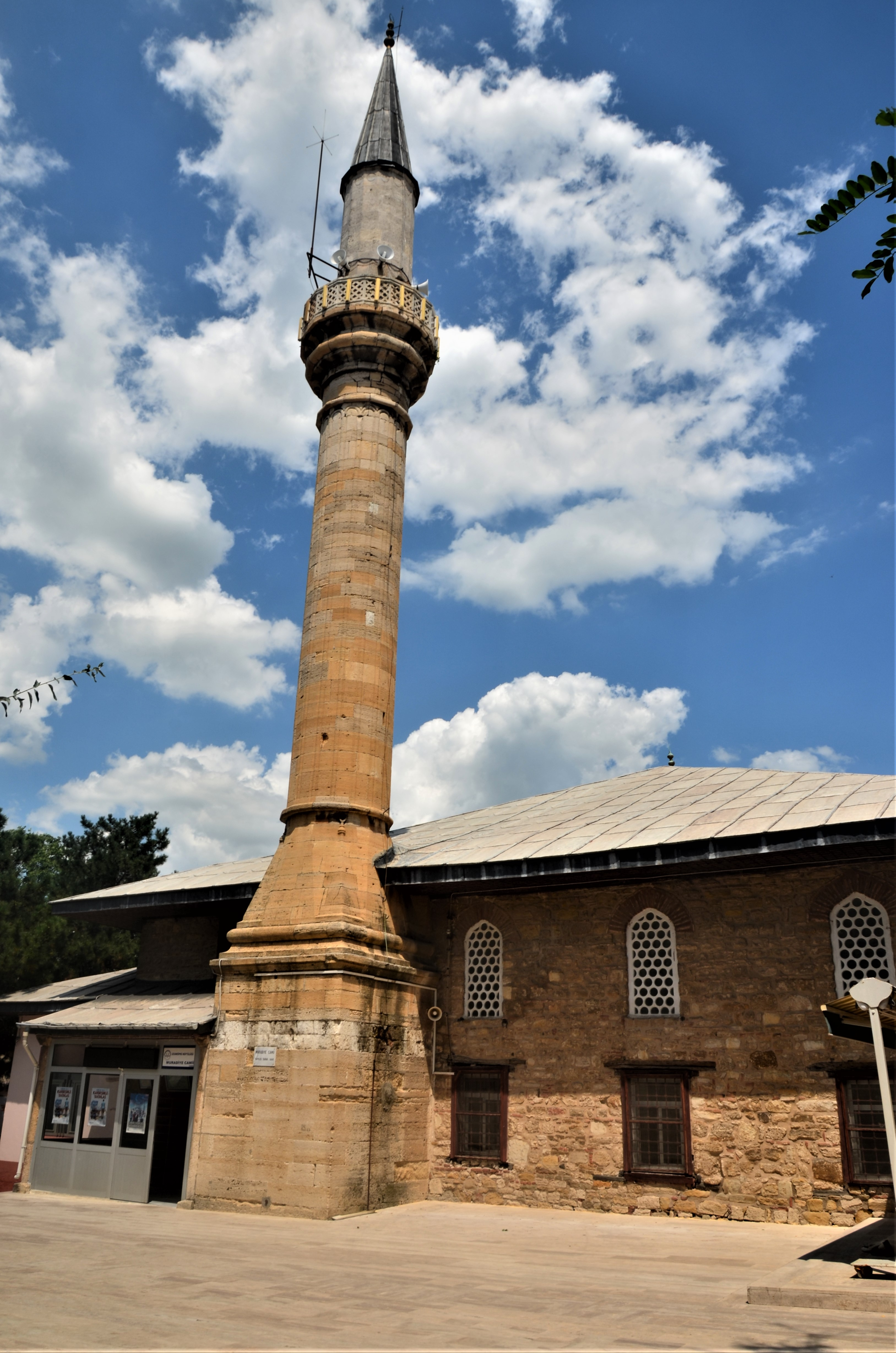
Mosque of Murad II (Turkish: Muradiye Camii)

The Mosque of Murat II which is located in the Muradiye neighbourhood, was built by Ottoman Sultan Murad II (reigned 1421–1444 and 1446– 1451) along with the Uzunkopru and opened to service in 1444. It's one of the mosques carrying the title of Selatin, a mosque commissioned by the Ottoman dynasty. Although the Muradiye Mosque was originally built as a part of Külliye, areligious building complex, with a hammam (bayh) and an imaret (public kitchen) around, today only the mosque has survived.

The mosque made of rubble is seated on a rectangular base measuring 22 m (72 ft) in length and 19 m (62 ft) in width. Although initially the roof used to be structured as a dome, later this dome was removed during the renovation works in Osman II period (1618–1622) and replaced with a span roof coated with lead. It is the biggest span roofed mosque built up by the Ottomans. It has a capacity of 500 people. On the other hand, with a 5.70 m (18.7 ft) height, it is pretty low for a mosque. That is why, its windows are almost aligned with the fringes of the roof.

In front of the mosque, there is a last congregation porch that has the dimensions of 3.80 by 22.20 m (12.5 by 72.8 ft). Although in its original state 12 wooden pillars were used to support the porch, in the restorations performed in the ensuing years, those pillars have been removed and a wall built instead. Apart from this, the mosque hosts a small cemetery in the backside, where the prominent people of the city were interred.

The minaret adjacent to the wall of the mosque is made of ashlar and introduced into the body with Turkish triangles on a rectangular pedestal. The minaret body is round and has a single balcony.

The courtyard of the mosque has three gates situated as two in the west and one in the east. On the main entrance gate located in the west, there is a marble inscription plaque written by the famous Ottoman historian Abdurrahman Hibri recording that the mosque was built by Murad II in 1443 and renovated by Osman II in 1621.

In the courtyard, there is a shadirvan (fountain) covered with a pyramidal spire just across the main entrance. It has an octagonal prism basin and eight taps. The fountain's former eight wooden poles were replaced in a renovation work in 1993 with reinforced concrete columns. The tradition of serving sharbat to the congregation after religious practices in the Ottoman Empire was started for the first time by pouring sharbat from this fountain's taps.

Media related to Mosque of Murad II, Uzunköprü at Wikimedia Commons

=== The Church of St. John the Baptist ===
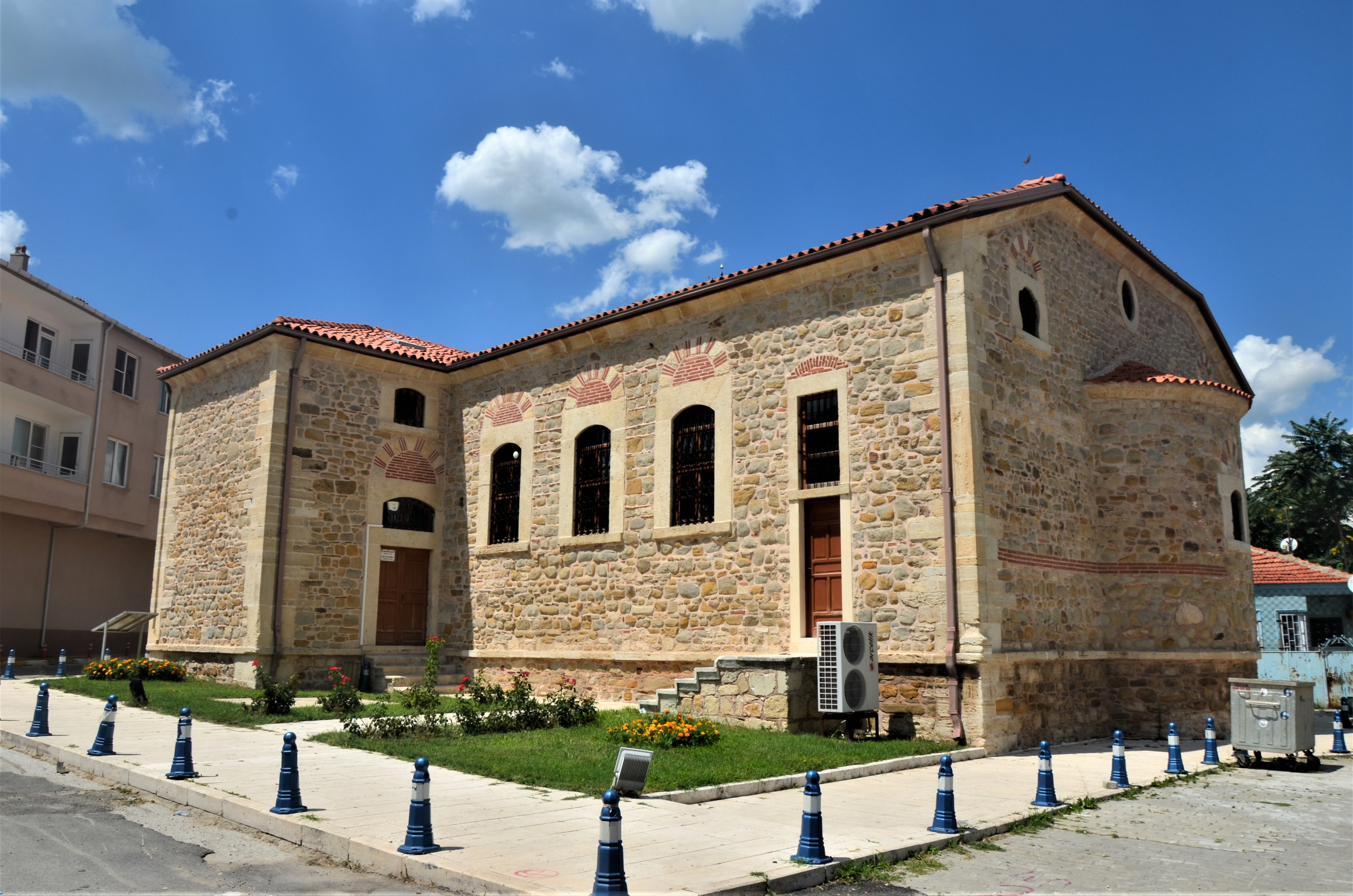
Church of Saint John the Baptist (Turkish: Aziz Ioannis Kilisesi)

The Greek Orthodox Saint John the Baptist Church (Turkish: Aziz Ioannis Kilisesi) was built by the Greek community on behalf of Saint John the Baptist (Ioannis Prodromos) in 1875. It is located in the Muradiye neighborhood in Uzunkopru. The church is built of rubble with red bricks scattered among. It was structured as in basilica style with three naves and semi-dome. The apse and the roof are covered with tile. Also the apse and the naves contains barrel vaulted rectangular windows. The walls of the middle nave are embellished with the frescos depicting twelve apostles separately as six on the right and six on the left.

It is known that over 17,000 Greek citizens had been baptized in the St. John the Baptist Church from 1875 until they left the city in 1924 as a result of the Population Exchange Protocol between Turkey and Greece signed in the Treaty of Lausanne. While the Greek citizens were leaving the city, they took all the items belonging to the church including the great bell, which is being used in the Church of Xanthi now. From 1924 to 2011, the church has been left idle without any use.

The St. John Church has gained back its old grandeur with the restoration work lasting from 2011 to 2013 by the Uzunköprü Municipality, and opened its doors again after a long time with a big ceremony attended by Patriarch Bartholomew I of Constantinople on 16 December 2013. Today, the church serves as the Art and Culture Center of Uzunköprü.

Media related to Church of Saint John the Baptist, Uzunköprü at Wikimedia Commons

== City Museum ==
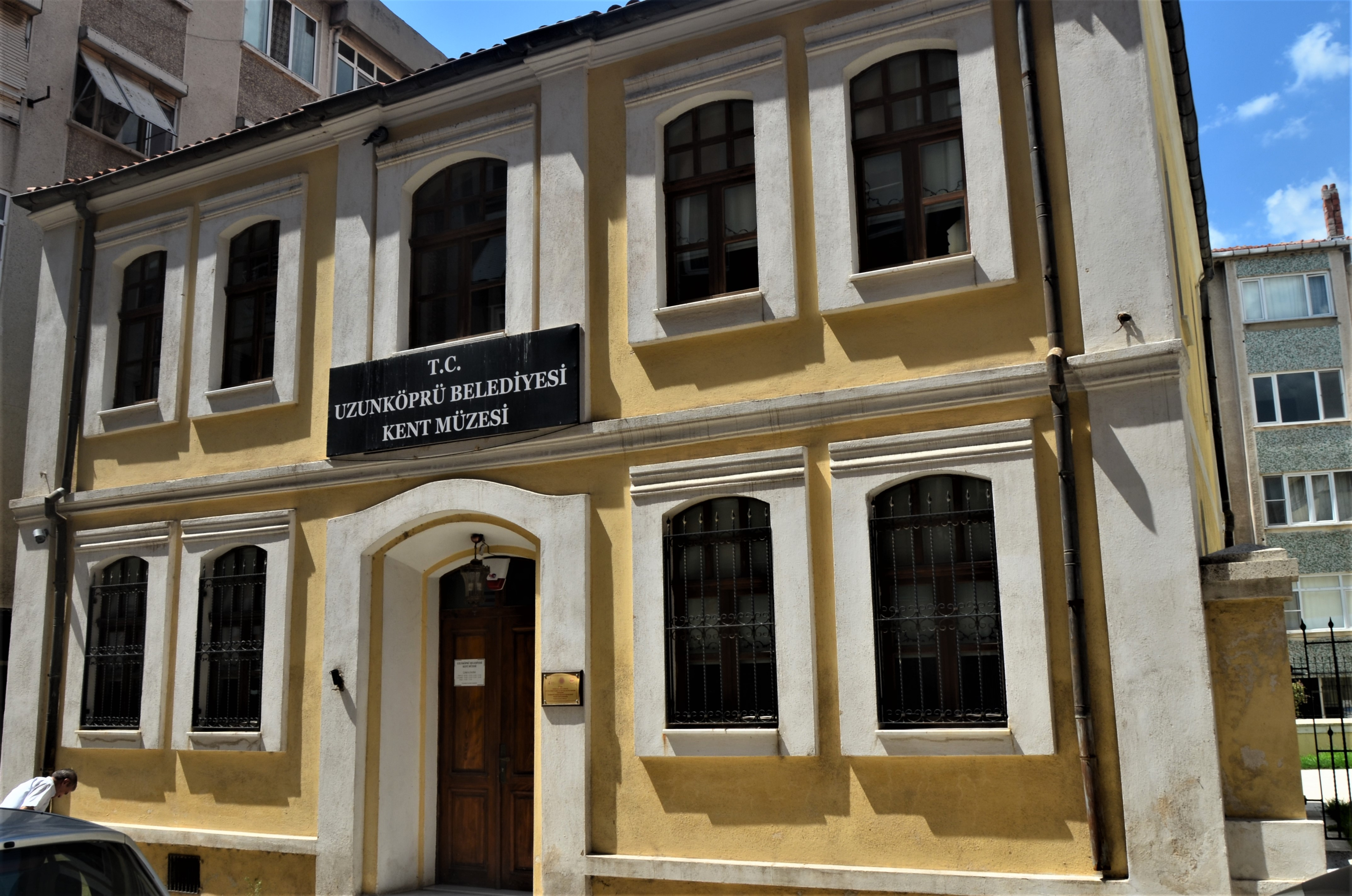
City Museum (Turkish: Uzunköprü Belediyesi Kent Müzesi)

Uzunköprü City Museum (Turkish: Uzunköprü Belediyesi Kent Müzesi) was opened to service on 16 December 2013 with conversion of the ex-Tekel (Turkish State Liquor and Tobacco Company) building to a museum following its restoration. The museum building, which is a historical structure on its own, was constructed as a private mansion in the beginning of the 20th century, and from 1939, it had started to be used as Tekel storage, outlet and lodge. After the abolition of the Tekel in Uzunköprü in the 1990s, the building was left disused and later became a museum.

Media related to City Museum of Uzunköprü at Wikimedia Commons
