= Edirne Province =

Province of Turkey

Coordinates: 41°07′12″N 26°31′14″E

Edirne Province Edirne ili
- Province
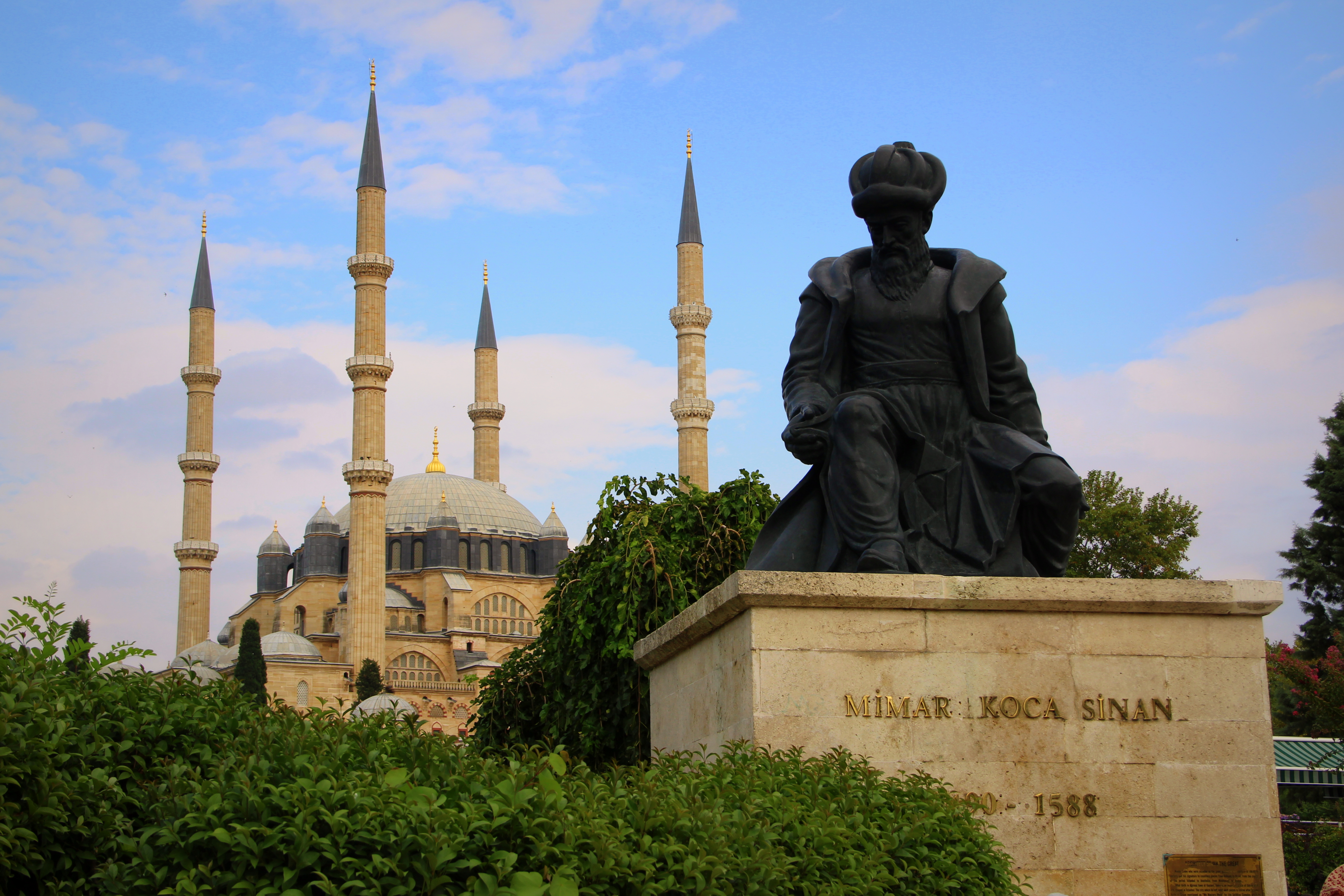
- Selimiye Mosque in Edirne

- Location of the province within Turkey
- Country: Turkey
- Seat: Edirne

Government
  - Governor: Yunus Sezer
- Area: 6,145 km^{2} (2,373 sq mi)
- Population (2022): 414,714
  - Density: 67.49/km^{2} (174.8/sq mi)
- Time zone: UTC+3 (TRT)
- Area code: 0284
- Website: www.edirne.gov.tr

Edirne Province (Turkish: Edirne ili) is a Turkish province located in East Thrace. Part of European Turkey, it is one of only three provinces located entirely within continental Europe. Its area is 6,145 km^{2}, and its population is 414,714 (2022). Edirne Province is bordered by Tekirdağ Province and Kırklareli Province to the east, and the Gallipoli peninsula of Çanakkale Province to the south-east. It shares international borders with Bulgaria (Haskovo and Yambol Provinces) to the north and Greece (Eastern Macedonia and Thrace) to the west. Edirne is the capital of the province, and the largest city. It is the only province of Turkey that borders Greece.

== History ==
Edirne, capital of the province, served as the third capital of the Ottoman Empire from 1363 to 1453.

Edirne province was included in the Second Inspectorate General which was created on the 19 February 1934 and extended over the provinces of Edirne, Çanakkale, Kırklareli, Tekirdağ. It was ruled by an Inspector General, who had wide-ranging authorities over civilian, military and educational matters. The office of the Inspectorate-General was abandoned in 1948 but the legal framework of the Inspectorate-Generals was only abolished in 1952, under the Government of the Democrat Party.

Until the reign of Selim I, there were remnant populations of so-called Tengri Turks in the province of Edirne who adhered to the ancient beliefs of Tengrism. It is assumed that it was a group of nomadic Yörüks.

== Demographics ==
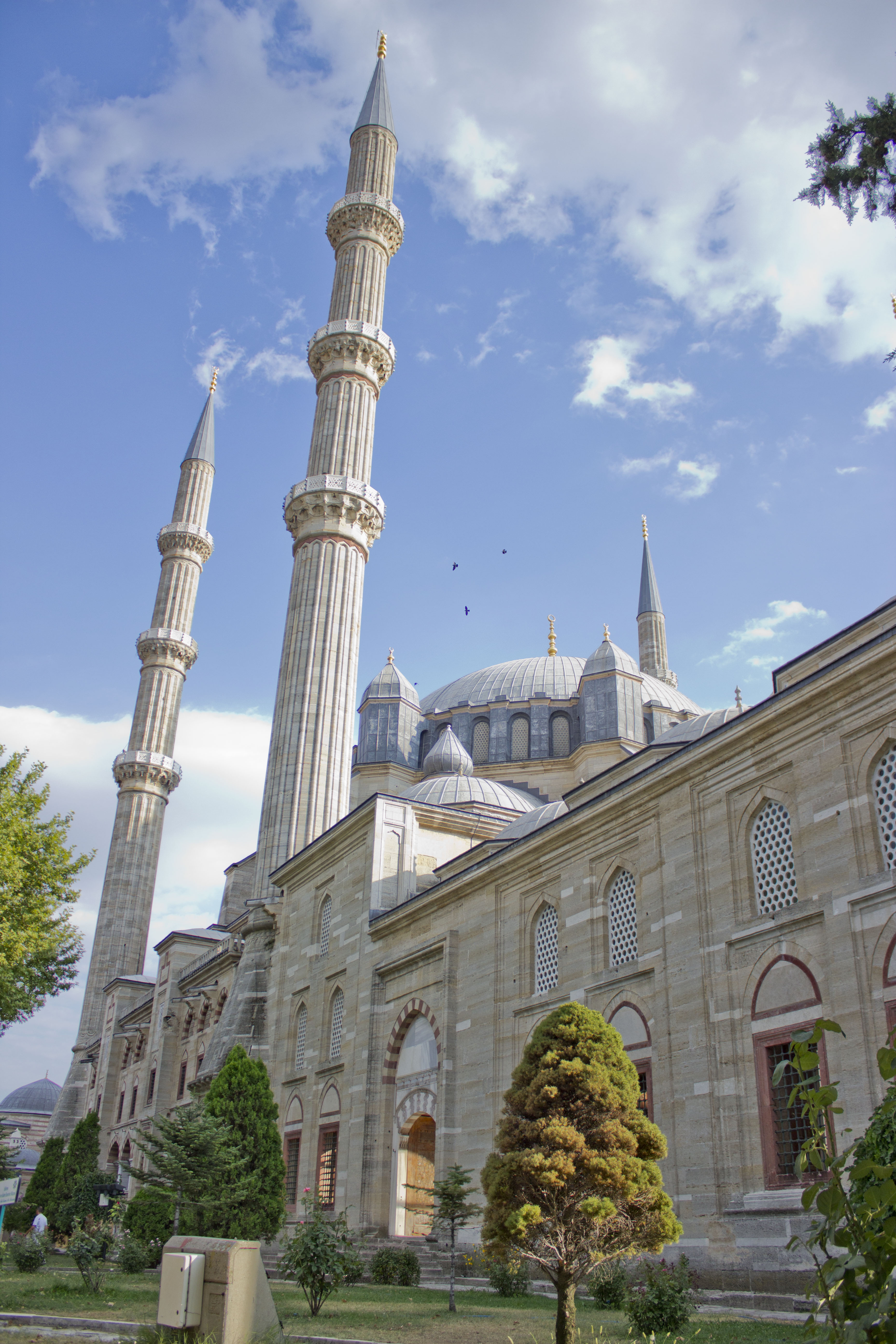
Selimiye Mosque is situated in Edirne

Historical population
Year	Pop.	±% p.a.
1927	150,840	—
1940	251,373	+4.01%
1950	221,268	−1.27%
1960	276,479	+2.25%
1970	316,425	+1.36%
1980	363,286	+1.39%
1990	404,599	+1.08%
2000	402,606	−0.05%
2010	390,428	−0.31%
2018	411,528	+0.66%

== Districts ==
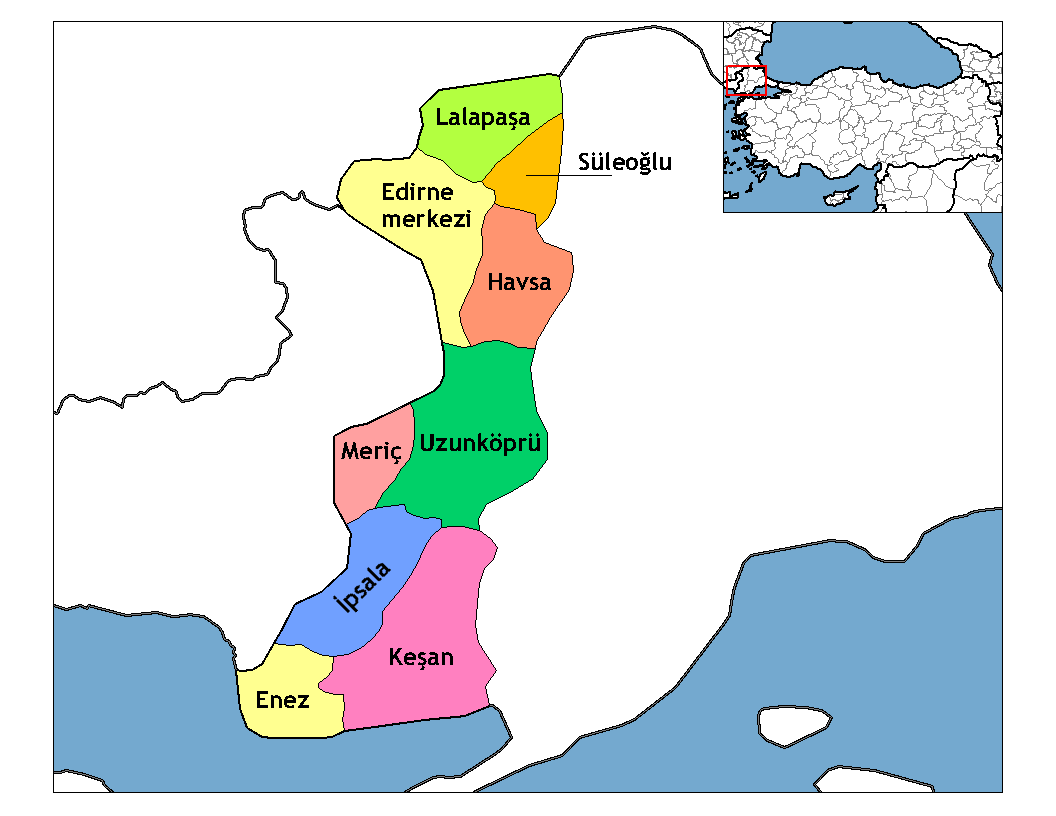
Edirne districts

Edirne province is divided into 9 districts (capital district in bold):

- **Edirne**
- Enez
- Havsa
- İpsala
- Keşan
- Lalapaşa
- Meriç
- Süloğlu
- Uzunköprü

== Gallery ==
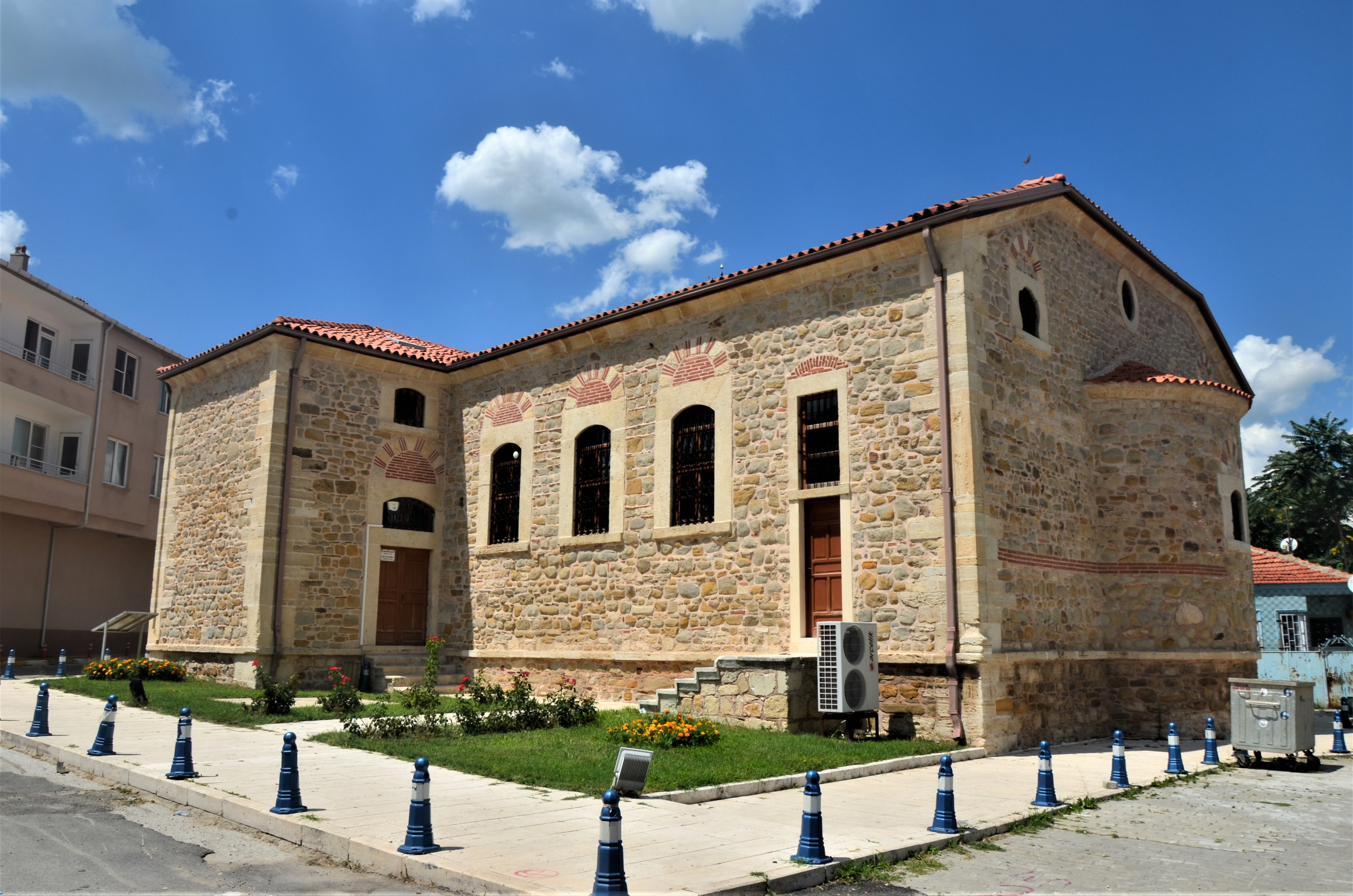
Church of Saint John the Baptist in Uzunköprü.

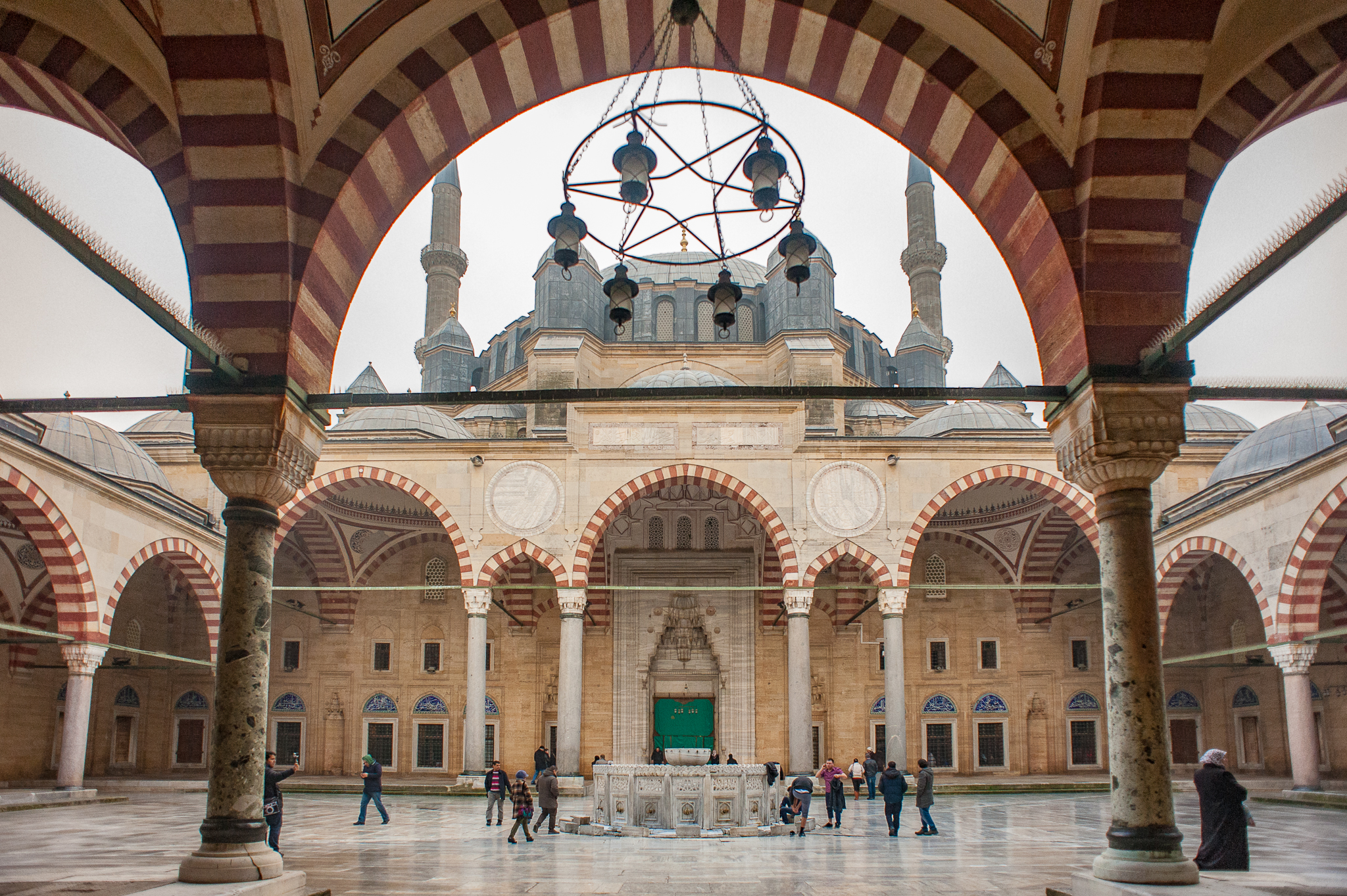
Selimiye Mosque

== See also ==
- Edirne Vilayet
- List of populated places in Edirne Province
