= Tundzha =

River in Bulgaria and Turkey

Tundzha, Tunca
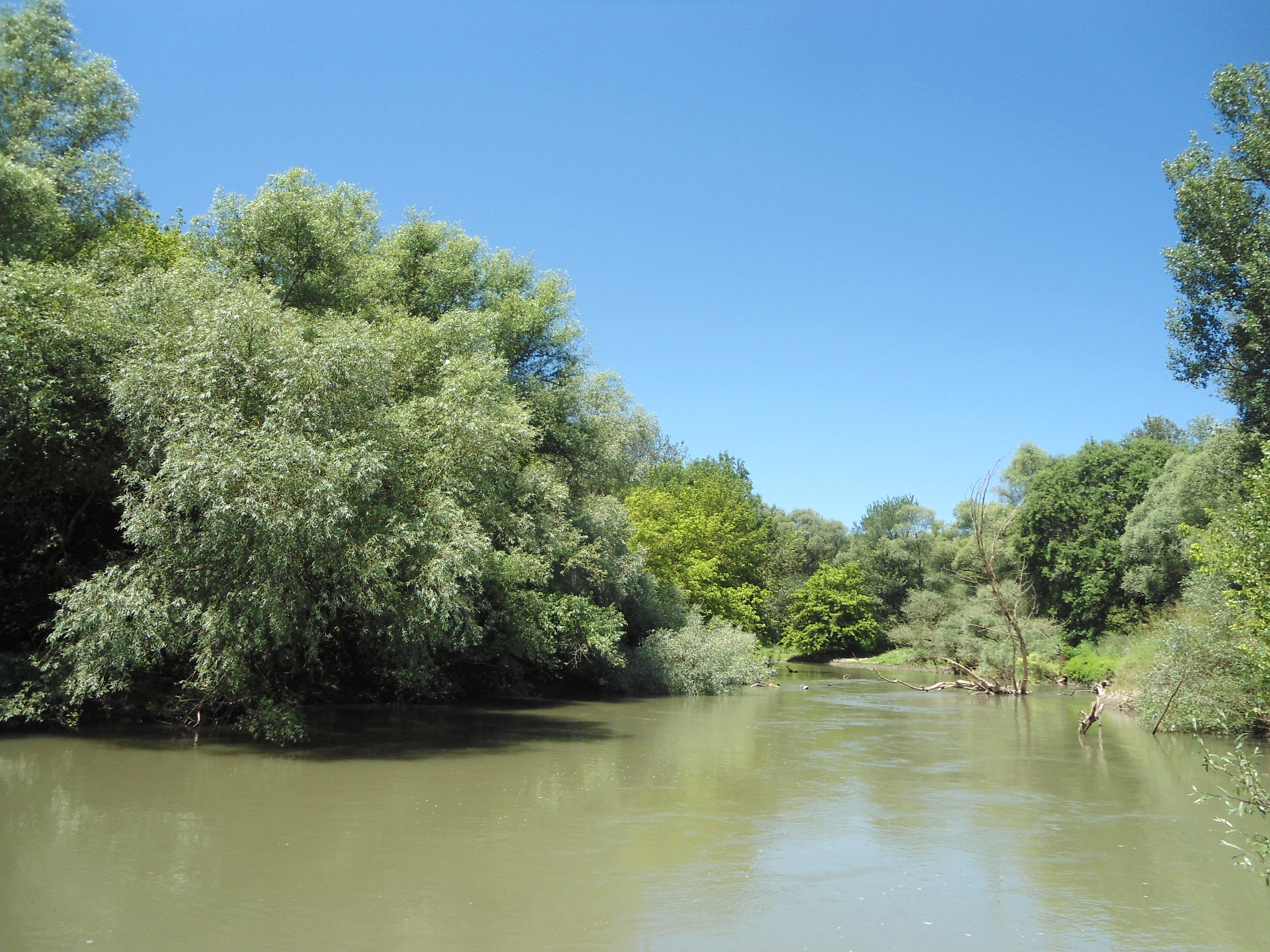
- The Tundzha near Elhovo, Bulgaria

Location
- Country: Bulgaria, Turkey

Physical characteristics
- Source
  - location: east of Botev Peak, Balkan Mountains, Bulgaria
  - coordinates: 42°43′40″N 24°58′10″E
  - elevation: 2,083 m (6,834 ft)
- Mouth
  - location: Maritsa at Edirne, Turkey
  - coordinates: 41.6616°N 26.5622°E
- Length: 390 km (240 mi)
- Basin size: 8,429 km^{2} (3,254 sq mi)

Basin features
- Progression: Maritsa→ Aegean Sea

The Tundzha (Bulgarian: Тунджа [ˈtund͡ʒɐ]; Turkish: Tunca [tund͡ʒa]; Tonsus in antiquity) is a river in southeastern Bulgaria and northwesternmost Turkey, a left tributary of the Maritsa. With a length of 390 km, of which 350 km are in Bulgaria, it is Maritsa's longest tributary, though in terms of discharge it is second after the Arda. Tundzha Glacier on Livingston Island in the South Shetland Islands, Antarctica is named after Tundzha River.

== Geography ==
=== Course ===
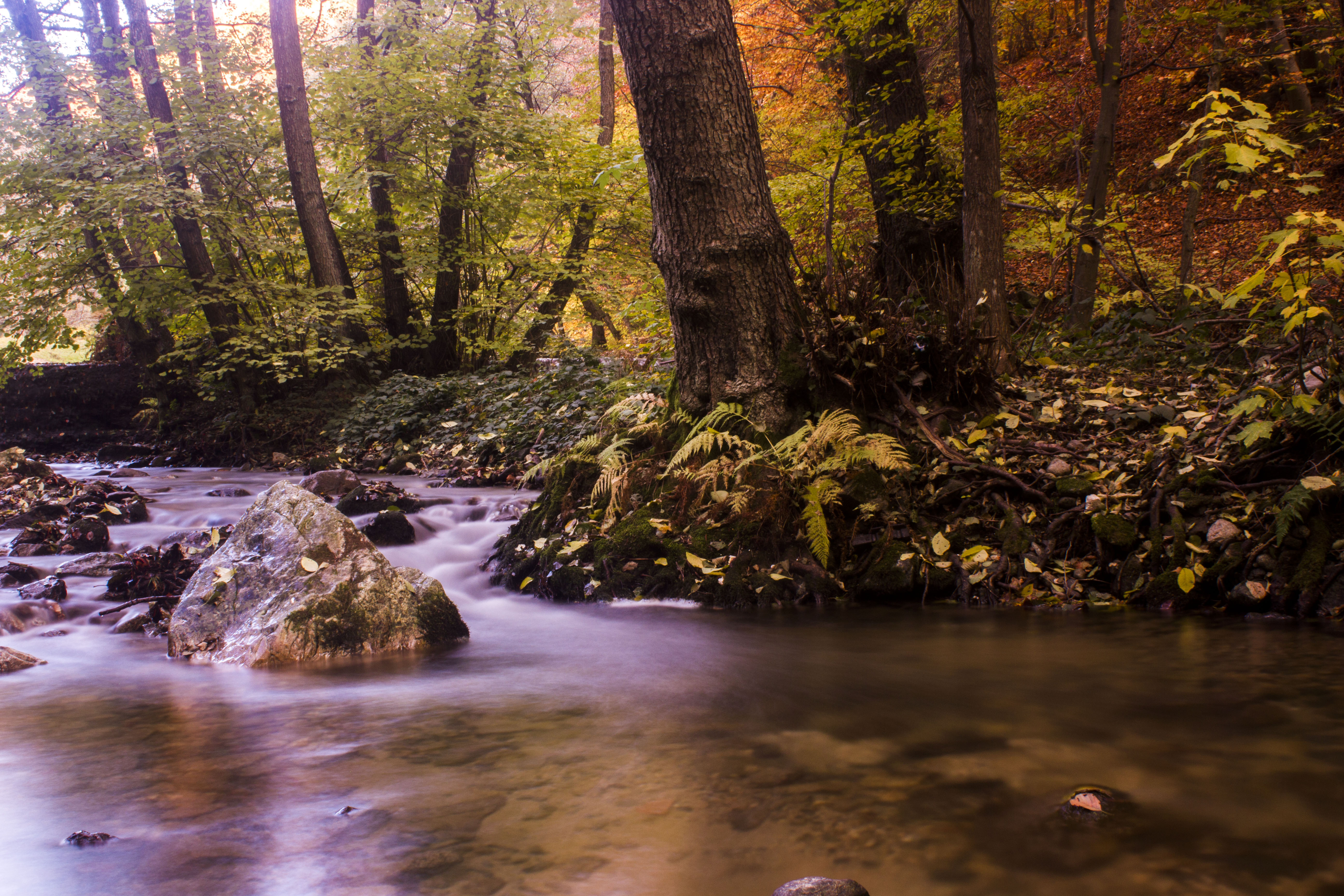
The upper course of the Tundzha in the Balkan Mountains

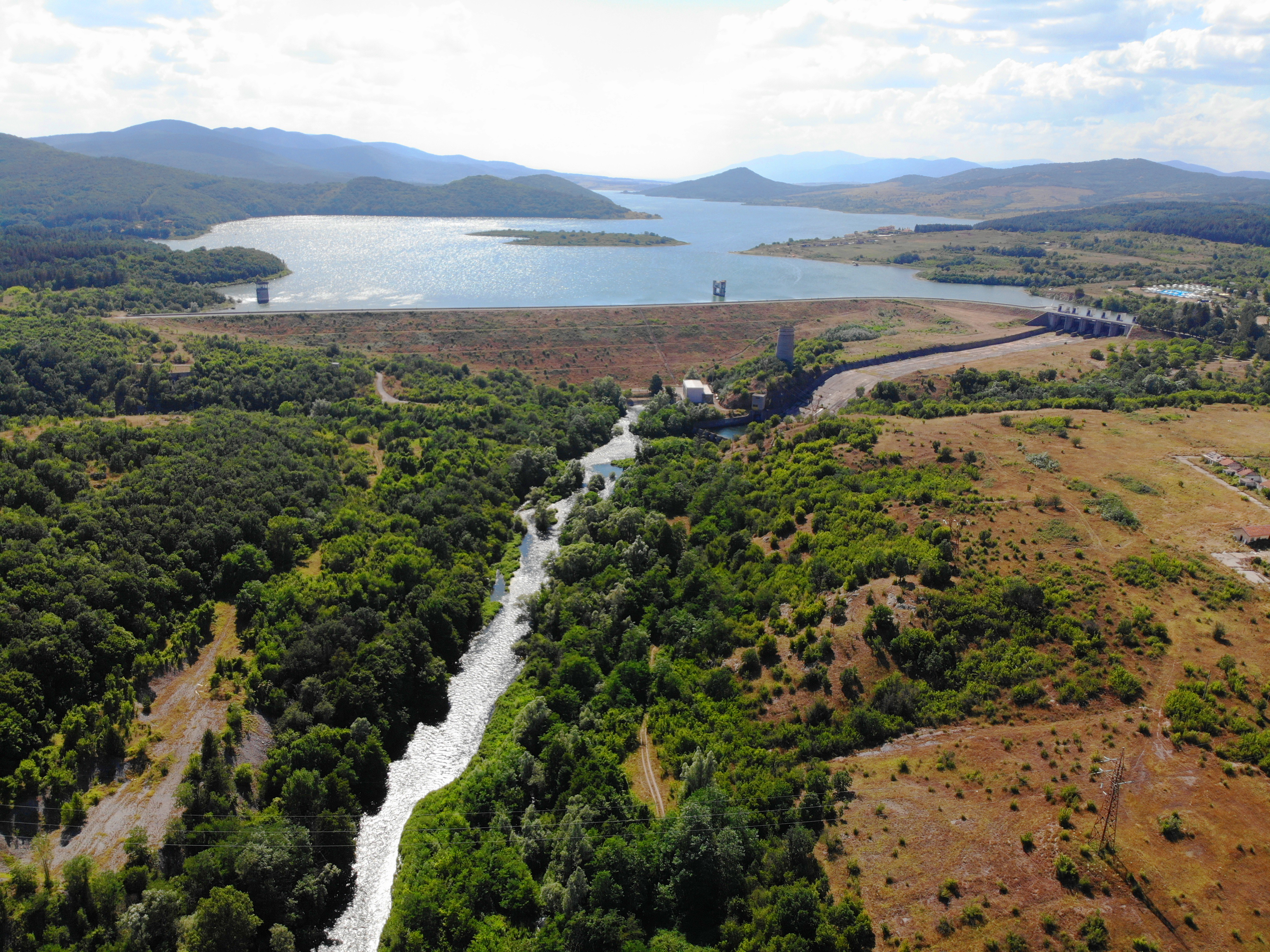
The Tundzha exiting the Zhrebchevo Reservoir

The Tundzha springs at an altitude of 2,083 m some 250 m south of the summit of Yurushka Gramada (2,136 m) in the central Balkan Mountains. Its source lies about two kilometers east of Botev Peak (2,376 m), the highest summit in the mountain range. It flows south in a deep valley with steep slopes and a large longitudinal gradient. The riverbed is rocky with gravels. Its water current is high, reaching velocity of 1.5–2 m/s.

At the town of Kalofer the Tundzha turns east and then enters the western reaches of the Kazanlak Valley, where the river valley widens to 3–4 km at the village of Aleksandrovo and then narrows to one kilometer. In that section it flows closer to the northern slopes of Sredna Gora and has steep right slopes. The river meanders, the riverbed is 20–25 m wide and 0.7 m deep. The bottom consists of sand and fine gravel. The velocity of the current is 1–1.5 m/s; the gradient is 1.5‰. The river valley narrows further between the villages of Viden and Buzovgrad, reaching several dozen meters at the village of Koprinka, where the dam of the Koprinka Reservoir has been constructed; it then again widens to one kilometer. The riverbed in that section is 28–30 m, the current is 1 m/s; the bottom consists of sand and gravel.

Downstream of Buzovgrad the valley widens significantly, reaching 5–7 m; the river forms several strongly curved meanders, especially between the villages of Yagoda and Zimnitsa. The gradient in that section is 1.5‰. Just downstream of the town of Nikolaevo the Tundzha enters the Tvarditsa Valley and then the Mezhdenik Gorge, where the river valley narrows, at places to 60–100 m; in the narrowest section is the dam of the Zhrebchevo Reservoir. It exits the gorge at the village of Binkos and enters the Sliven Valley for the next 70 km. There, the river valley reaches a width of 2–3 km, the gradient decreases to 1,0‰; the Tundzha forms numerous meanders. Further east, the river valley widens to more than 7 km.

Southeast of the village of Zhelyu Voyvoda the river turns south and maintains that general direction to its mouth. Before the city of Yambol, the Tundzha passes through a short and wide gorge and receives its largest tributary, the Mochuritsa. Downstream from the city the river enters the Yambol Field. The river valley in that section is vaguely pronounced, reaching a width of 10–40 km; that is the section with the most meanders in its entire course. At the village of Konevets the river enters the elongated Elhovo Field, where the riverbed is 40–50 m wide and the average depth is 1–1.5 m; the gradient decreases to 0.7‰. Its banks are low, gently sloping and overgrown with willows. The bottom is sandy.

Downstream from the village of Knyazhevo the Tundzha enters the long picturesque Srem Gorge between the Sakar mountain range to the west and the Dervent Heights to the east. The gorge is narrow, reaching some 100–200 m, with steep bare slopes and rocky uneven riverbed. There is a small widening of 0.8–1 km between the villages of Srem and Ustrem, after which the gorge narrows again with deforested slopes and in places almost canyon-like. In that section the river is about 60 m wide with an average depth of 1–2 m. Shortly after exiting the gorge the river forms the Bulgaria–Turkey border for about 10 km. East of the village of Matochina the Tundzha leaves Bulgaria and enters Turkey, where it flows into the Maritsa at an altitude of 32 m in the city of Edirne.

=== Basin and hydrology ===
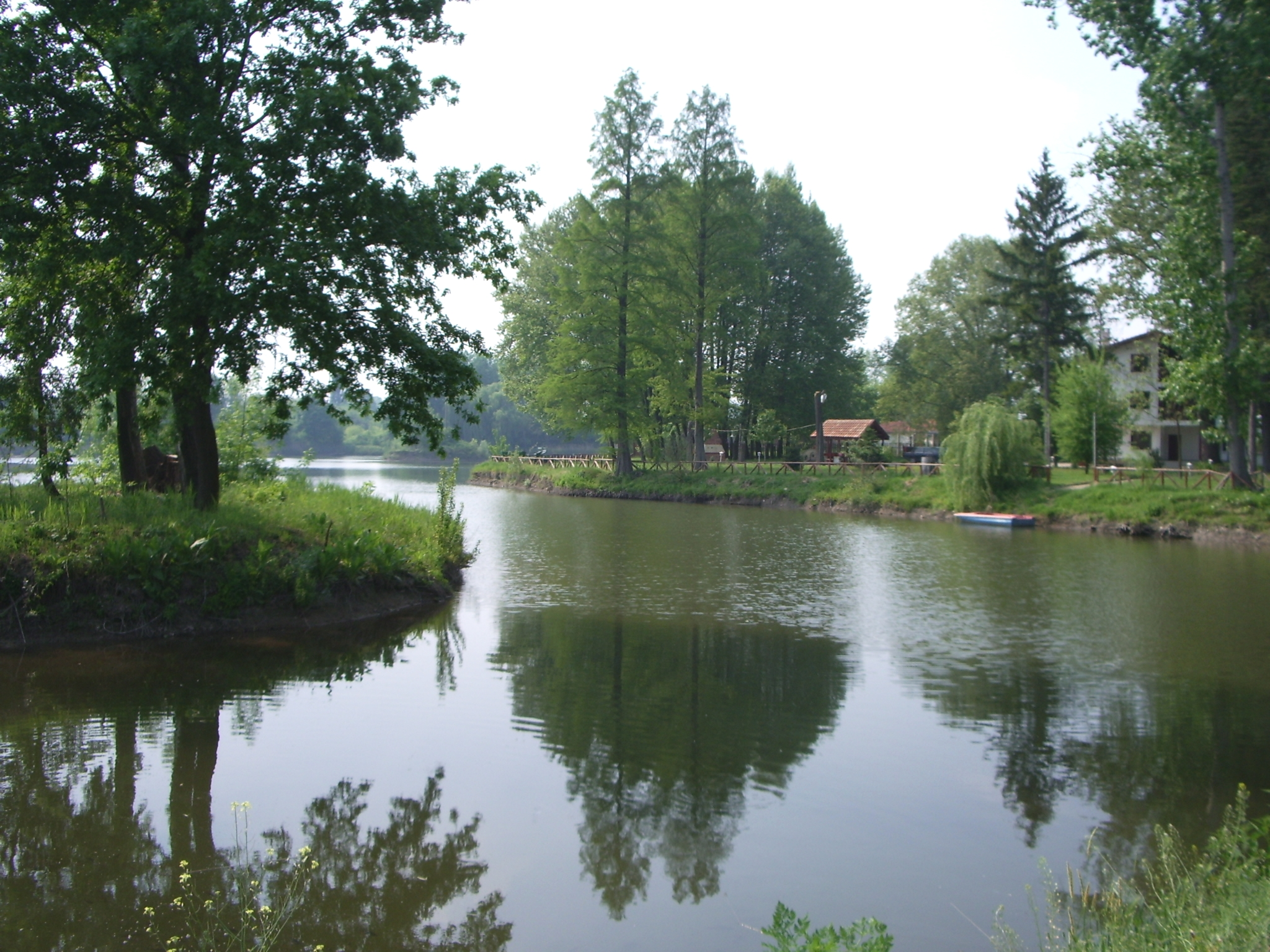
The Tundzha at Yambol

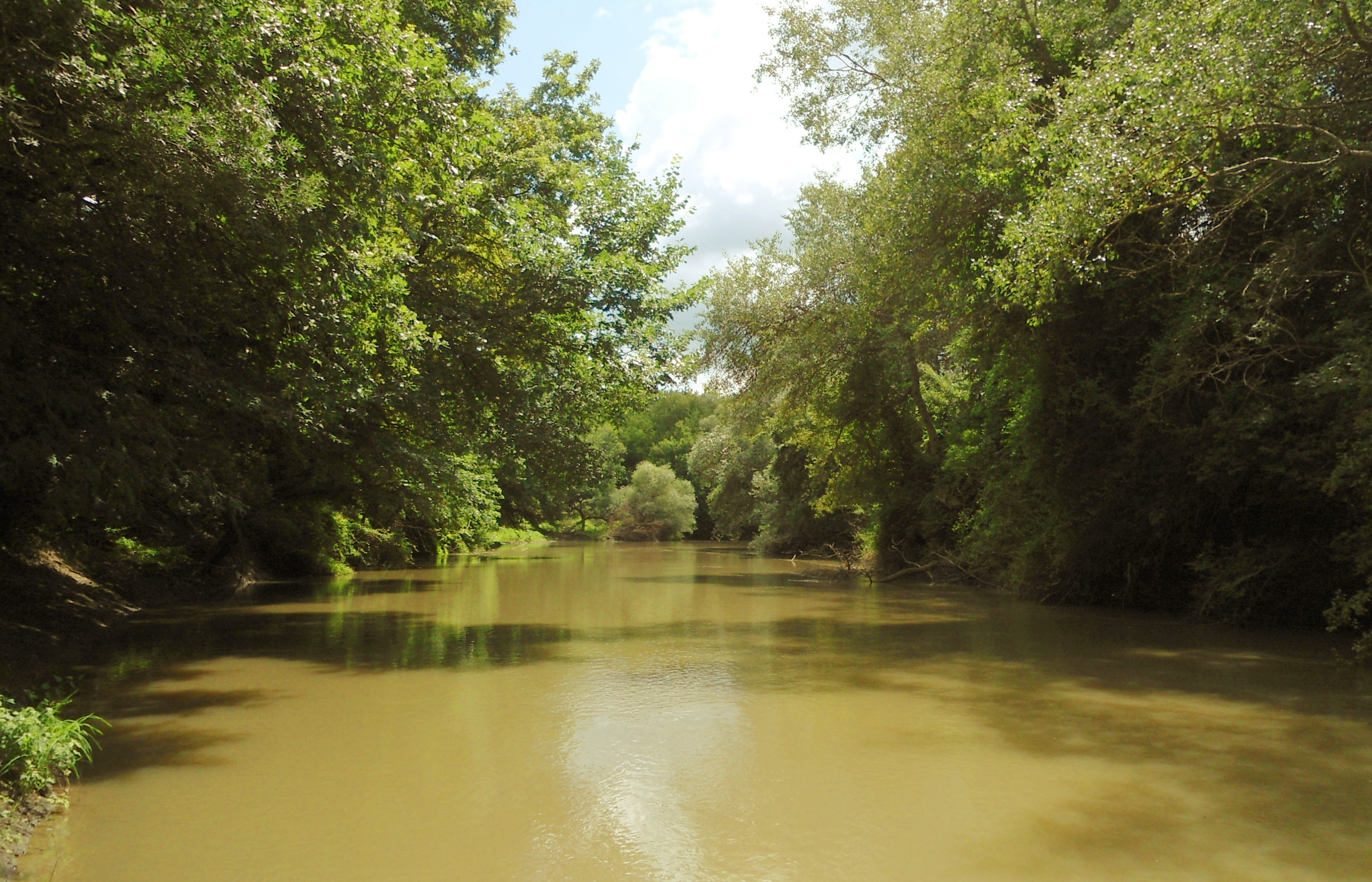
The Tundzha at Balabana Reserve

Its drainage basin covers an area of 8,429 km^{2} or 15.9% of the Maritsa's total. Of them 7,884 km^{2} are in Bulgaria, encompassing territory of seven provinces — northern Stara Zagora Province, central Sliven Province, over 80% of Yambol Province, eastern Haskovo Province, northwesternmost Burgas Province, as well as small areas of Plovdiv and Gabrovo Provinces. The remaining 548 km^{2} are in Turkey's Edirne Province. About 33% of the catchment area is forested, or 2,613 km^{2}.

Beginning from the right bank of the Tundzha mouth the boundaries of its basin head northeast through the southern outreaches of the Sakar mountain range, enters Bulgaria, follows Sakar's main ridge to its highest point Vishegrad (856 m), turns north, runs through the ridge of the Manastirski Heights, descends to the easternmost limits of the Upper Thracian Plain and then ascends the ridge of the Svetiiliyski Heights. Continuing north, the boundary again descend to the Upper Thracian Plain and north of the village of Staro Selo reaches the main ridge of the Sredna Gora mountain range, where it turns west. South of Kalofer, the boundary heads north again and via Strazhata reaches the main ridge of the Balkan Mountains at the summit of Yurushka Gramada. In that section the river basin borders the drainage systems of the Kemal (in Turkey), Kalamitsa, Levchenska reka, Golyama reka, Sazliyka, Omurovska reka, Brezovska reka and Stryama, all of them left tributaries of the Maritsa.

From Yurushka Gramada the boundary turns east, reaching the Vratnik Pass, following the main Balkan watershed via the subdivisions of the Balkan Mountains Kalofer Mountain, Shipka Mountain, Tryavna Mountain and Elena–Tvarditsa Mountain. There, it limits the basins of the rivers Osam and Yantra, right tributaries of the Danube.

From Vratnik Pass begins the border with the drainage systems of the rivers flowing directly into the Black Sea — the Luda Kamchiya, Kamchiya, Aytoska reka, Rusokastrenska reka, Sredetska reka and Fakiyska reka. The boundary in that section continues east through the crests of the Sliven, Stidovska and Karnobat mountains, and then turns south. It reaches the Hisar Heights, following their ridge westwards, then continues southwest through the Bakadzhitsite Heights, turning southeast at their highest point Asanbair (515 m), runs through several isolated elevations and reaches the northwestern slopes of the Strandzha mountain range, where it reaches the Bulgaria–Turkey border east of the village of Strandzha. It then turns west–southwest, following the state border for 15 km along the crest of the Dervent Heights until their highest point Gyurgenbair (555 m), there the basin boundary turns south–southwest, entering Turkey, runs east of the town of Lalapaşa and reaches the left banks of the Tundzha river mouth. In that last section it borders the basins of the Ergene and Sazlıdere, both left tributaries of the Maritsa.

The river receives over 60 tributaries. The most important include the Mochuritsa (86 km, left), Popovska reka (72 km, left), Sinapovska reka (50 km, right) and Tazha (26 km, left).

The annual distribution of Tundzha river discharge is determined by seasonal changes that characteristic of its basin's location in the transitional zone between the temperate continental climatic zone and the continental Mediterranean zone — generally high temperatures, short duration of snow cover in winter for the lowland areas and retention of relatively stable snow cover in winter in the mountainous parts of the basin, irregular distribution of rain with a peak in spring and a dry period with little rainfall in summer and autumn.

In the western part of the Balkan Mountains, at the town of Kalofer, high water occurs in March–April, when spring rains overlap with snowmelt of the snow cover at higher altitudes above 1500–1700 m; low water begins in July. In the lower part of the catchment area the high water period shifts to winter or autumn, while the low water period begins one or two months earlier, in May or June. The average annual discharge is 0.47 m^{3}/s at Kalofer, 33.5 m^{3}/s at Elhovo and 39.7 m^{3}/s at the Bulgaria–Turkey border. The average annual rainfall within the catchment basin is 550 mm; the average altitude of the basin 386 m; the density of the river network varies between 0.23 and 0.66 km/km^{2}.

== Ecology ==
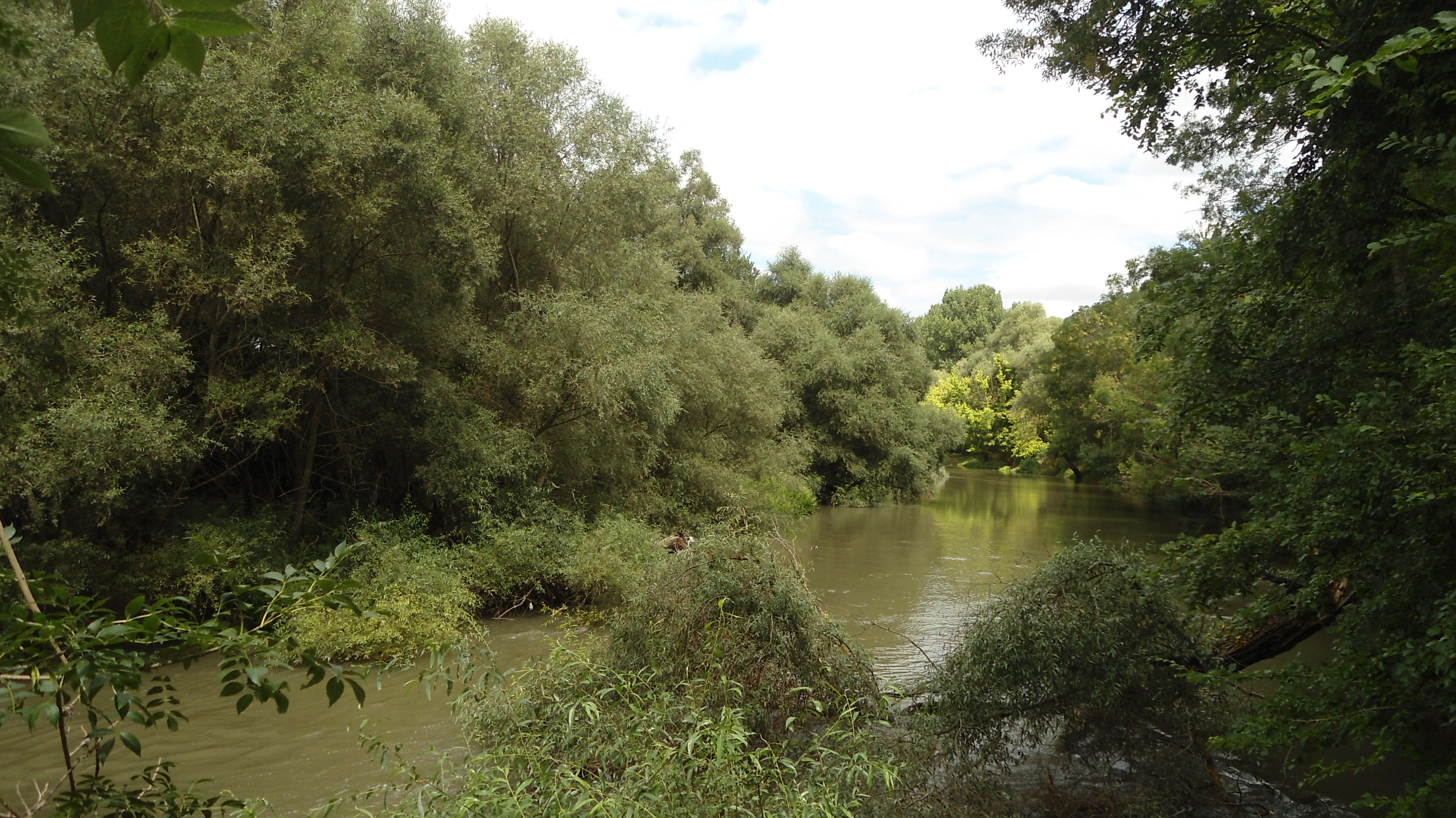
The Tundzha at Elhovo

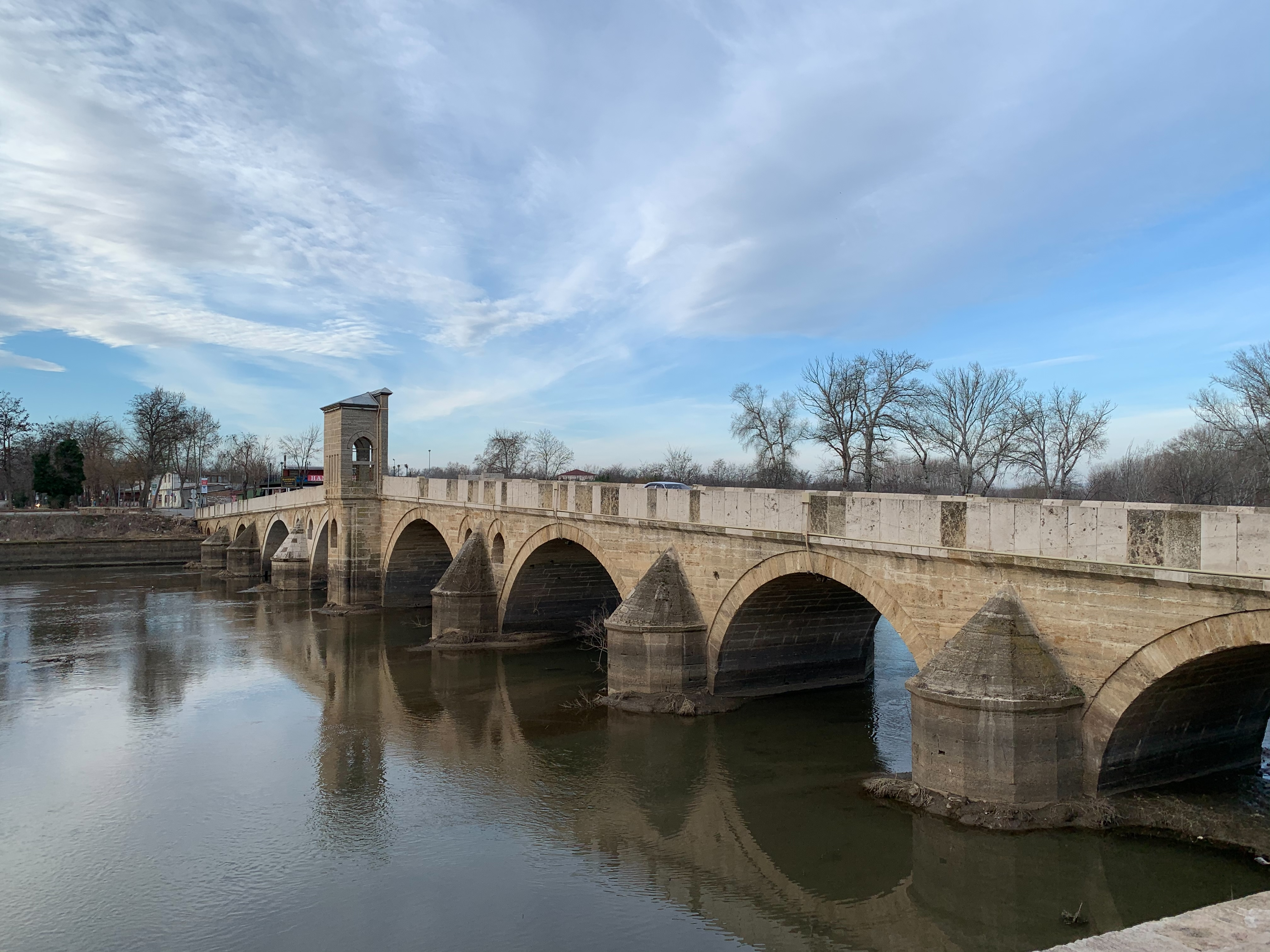
The Tunca Bridge in Edirne, Turkey

The ichtyofauna of the Tundzha shares similarities with that of the Maritsa basin in general. A 2014 study identified 19 fish species in its lower course on Bulgarian territory. Autochthonous taxa include Vardar nase, Macedonian vimba, Orpheus dace, round-scales barbel, asp, common carp, Prussian carp, crucian carp, common roach, common bleak, spined loach, European bitterling, etc. The Dnieper chub can be found in the river Mochuritsa.

Most of the river course is included in the European Union network of nature protection areas Natura 2000 in four separate protected areas. Its uppermost course is situated within the Dzhendema Reserve of the Central Balkan National Park. Near the town of Elhovo along the Tundzha's lower course are located three nature reserves, Gorna Topchia, Dolna Topchia and Balabana, which protect some of the most important riparian forests in the interior of Bulgaria, as well as rare flora and fauna, including major populations of common pheasant.

== Settlements and economy ==
There are 33 settlements along the Tundzha, including five towns and 25 villages in Bulgaria, and one town and four villages in Turkey. On Bulgarian territory are Kalofer (town) in Plovdiv Province, Osetenovo, Aleksandrovo, Pavel Banya (town), Viden, Ovoshtnik, Yagoda, Yulievo, Shanovo, Zimnitsa, Nova Mahala, Nikolaevo (town) and Panicherevo in Stara Zagora Province, Banya, Chervenakovo, Binkos, Mechkarevo, Samuilovo, Krushare and Zhelyu Voyvoda in Sliven Province, Yambol (city), Zavoy, Veselinovo, Okop, Hanovo, Tenevo, Konevets and Elhovo (town) in Yambol Province, as well as Knyazhevo and Srem in Haskovo Province. In Turkey are located Suakacağı, Hatipköy, Değirmenyanı, Avarız and Edirne (city). In total, there are 252 settlements in the whole Tundzha river basin on Bulgarian territory.

There are 264 reservoirs in the Tundzha catchment area; the largest are Zhrebchevo (400 million m^{3}) and Koprinka (142.2 million m^{3}). They are very important for the irrigation of large tracts of arable land and water discharge regulation. There are also several small-scale hydro power plants. The total annual waterflow is 1,265.8 million m^{3}, of which 245.1 million m^{3} are utilized for irrigation, industrial and potable water supply and electricity generation and additional 56.1 million m^{3} are diverted to the Maritsa and Yantra river systems for economic needs. There are many industrial enterprises in the Tundzha Valley, especially in Kazanlak, Sliven and Yambol, that require water supply, including the largest producer of military equipment in Bulgaria Arsenal AD, based in Kazanlak.

Since ancient times the river valley has been an important transport corridor in direction west–east in its upper half and north–south further downstream. Nowadays it is traversed by two major roads of the national network, a 116.2 km stretch of the first class I-6 road Gyueshevo–Sofia–Sliven–Burgas between Kalofer and Sliven, and a 36.6 km section of the first class I-7 road Silistra–Shumen–Yambol–Lesovo, which continues as D535 to Edirne in Turkey.

A section of railway line No. 3 Iliyantsi (Sofia)–Karlovo–Sliven–Karnobat–Varna served by the Bulgarian State Railways crosses the river valley in direction west–east between Kalofer and Slivan. The Tundzha valley is also traversed by a small section of railway line No. 8 Plovdiv–Stara Zagora–Yambol–Karnobat–Burgas between Yambol and Zavoy, and the two lines merge at Zimnitsa a few kilometers east of the great river bend at Zavoy.

== Gallery ==
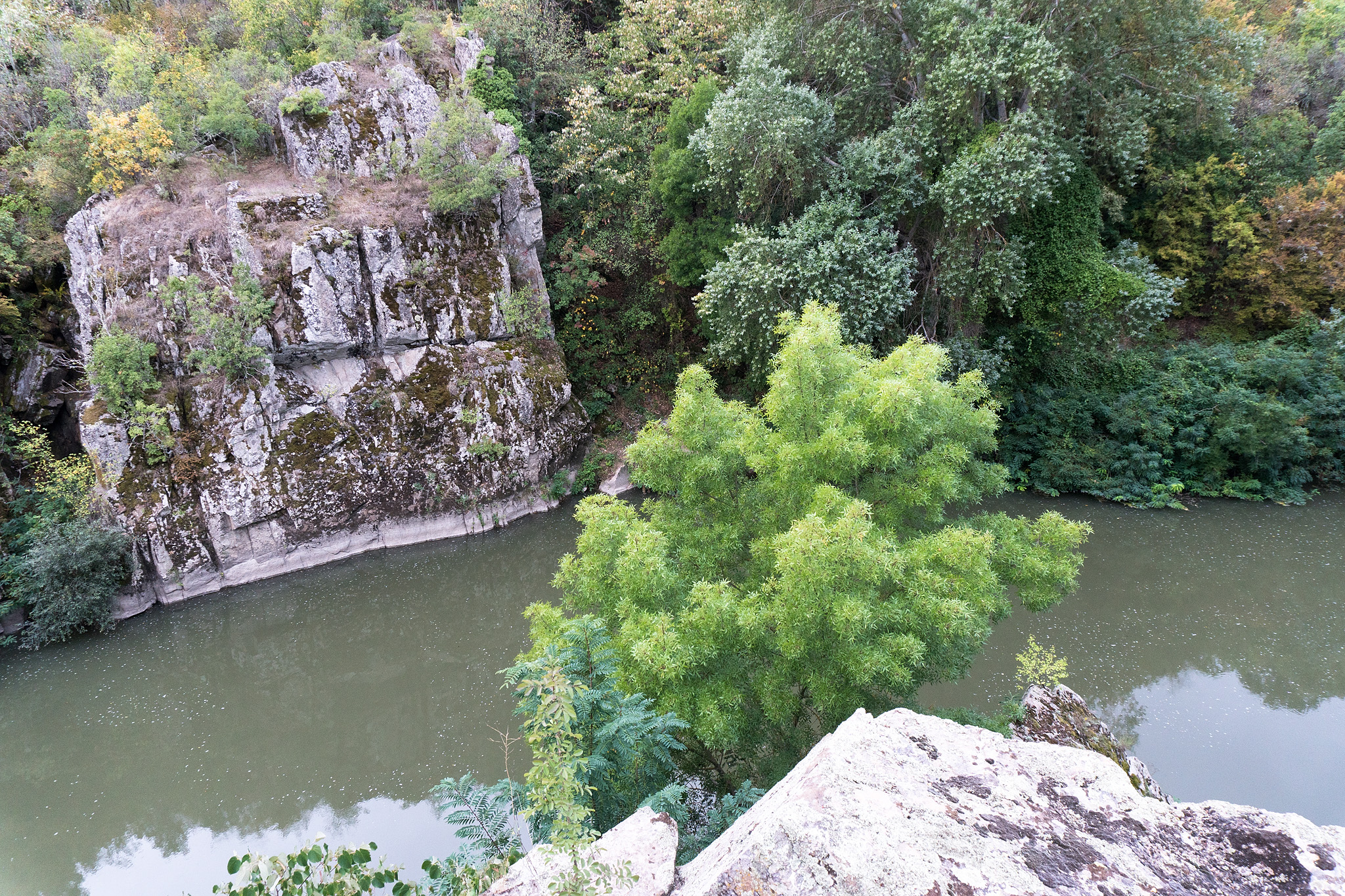
Darkaya locality, Bulgaria

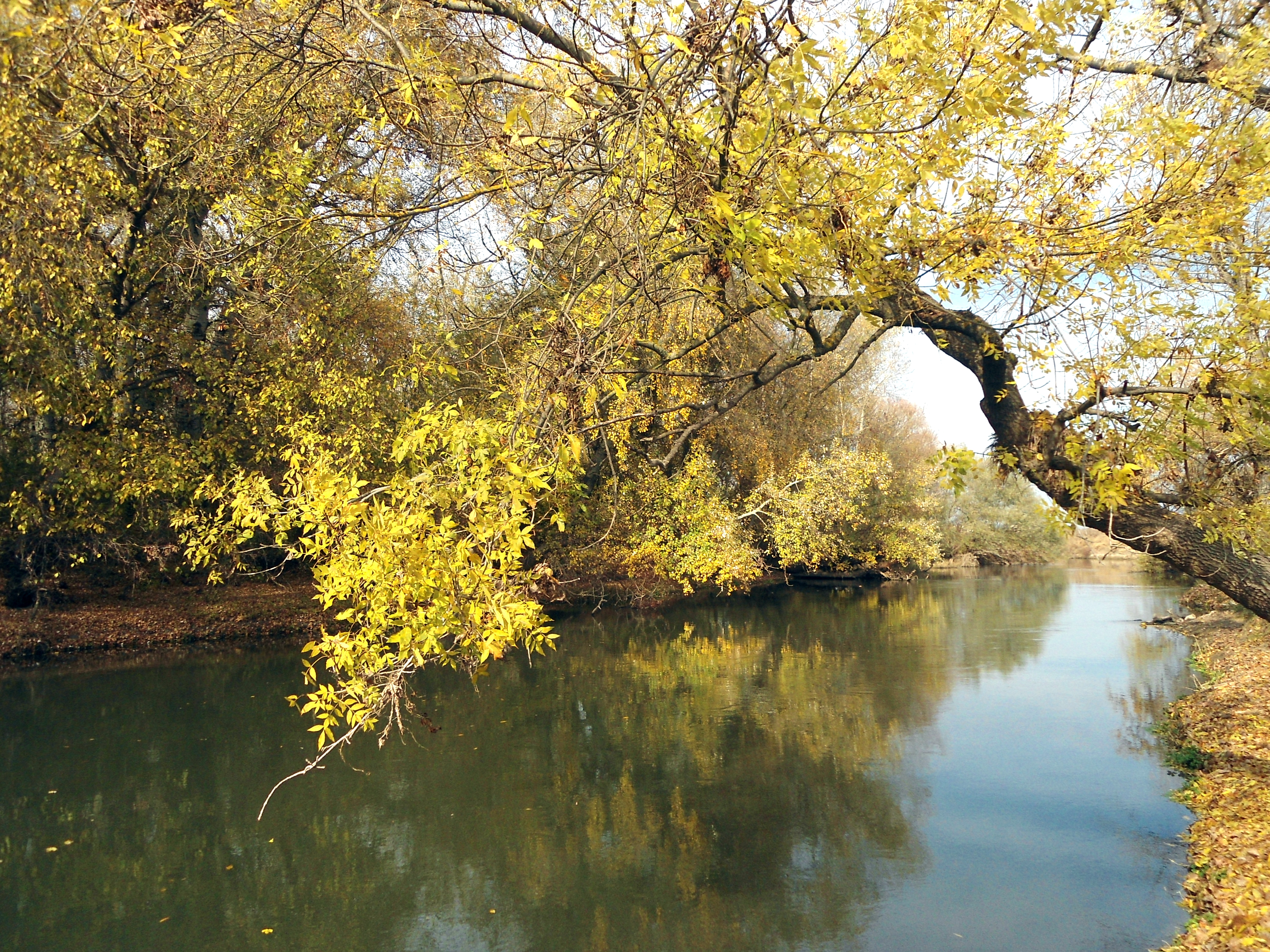
Riparian vegetation in autumn, Bulgaria

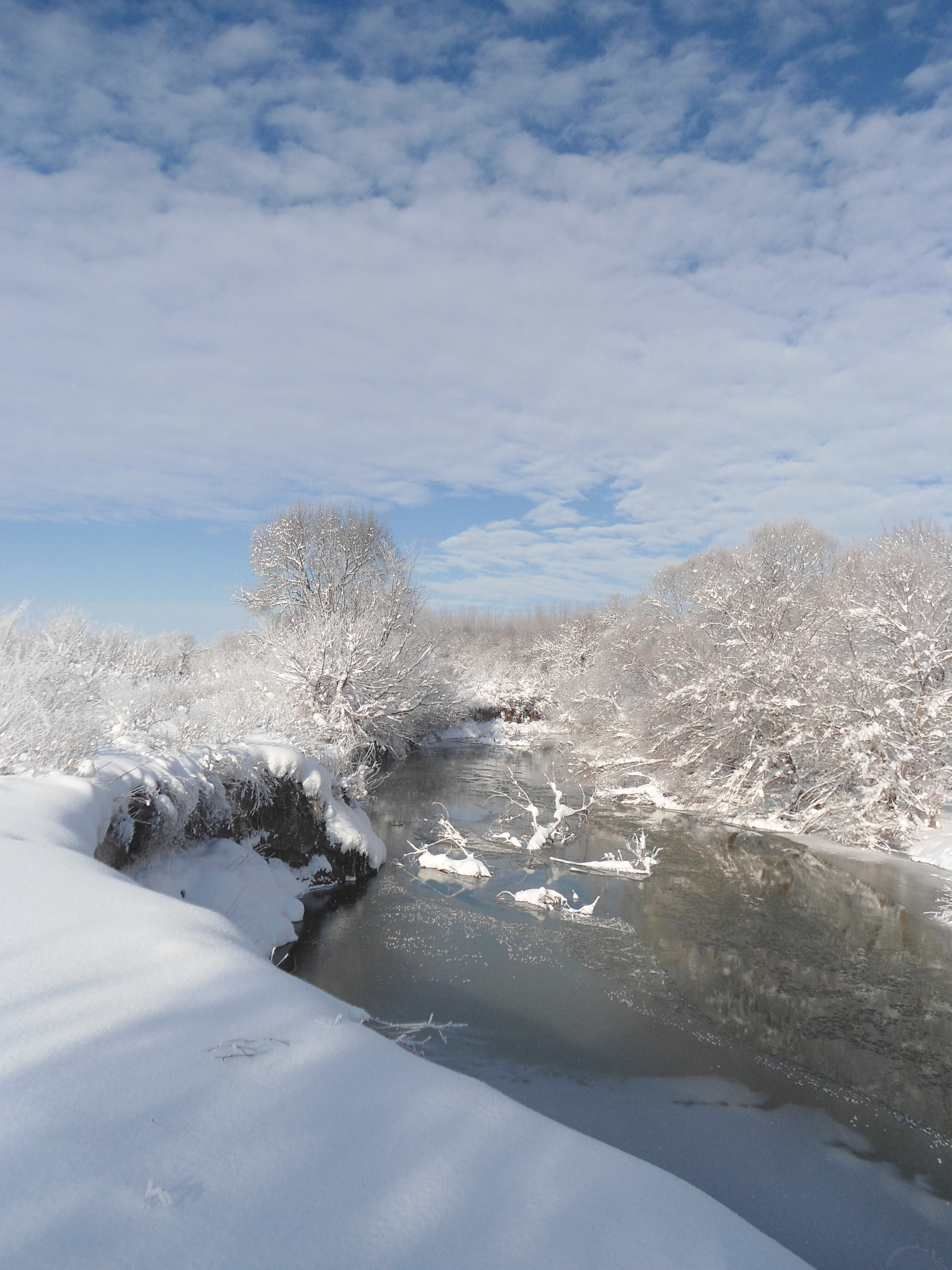
Winter view near Elhovo

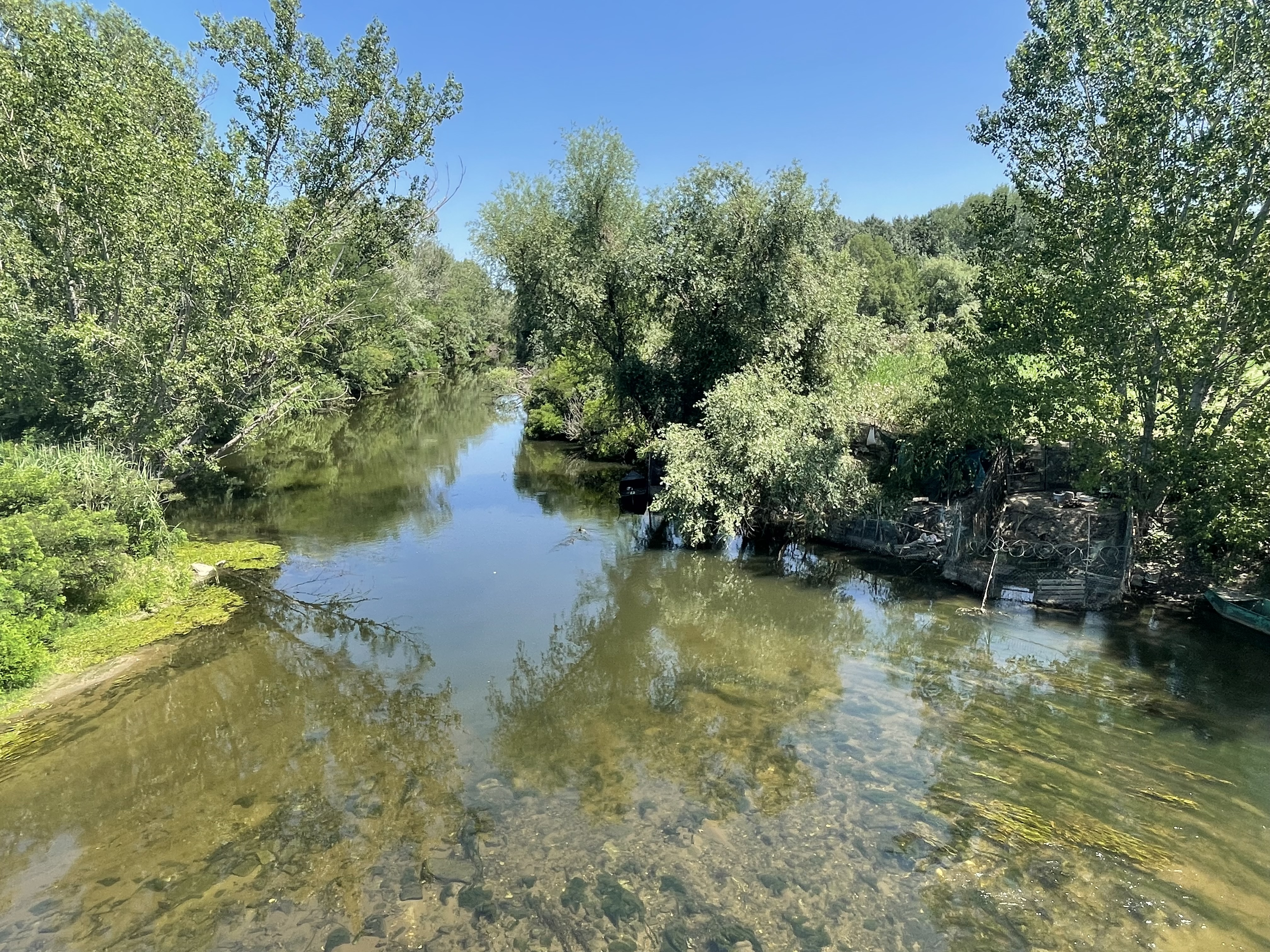
Tundzha River as seen from Saraçhane Bridge, built by Hadım Şehabeddin Pasha in Edirne, Turkey.

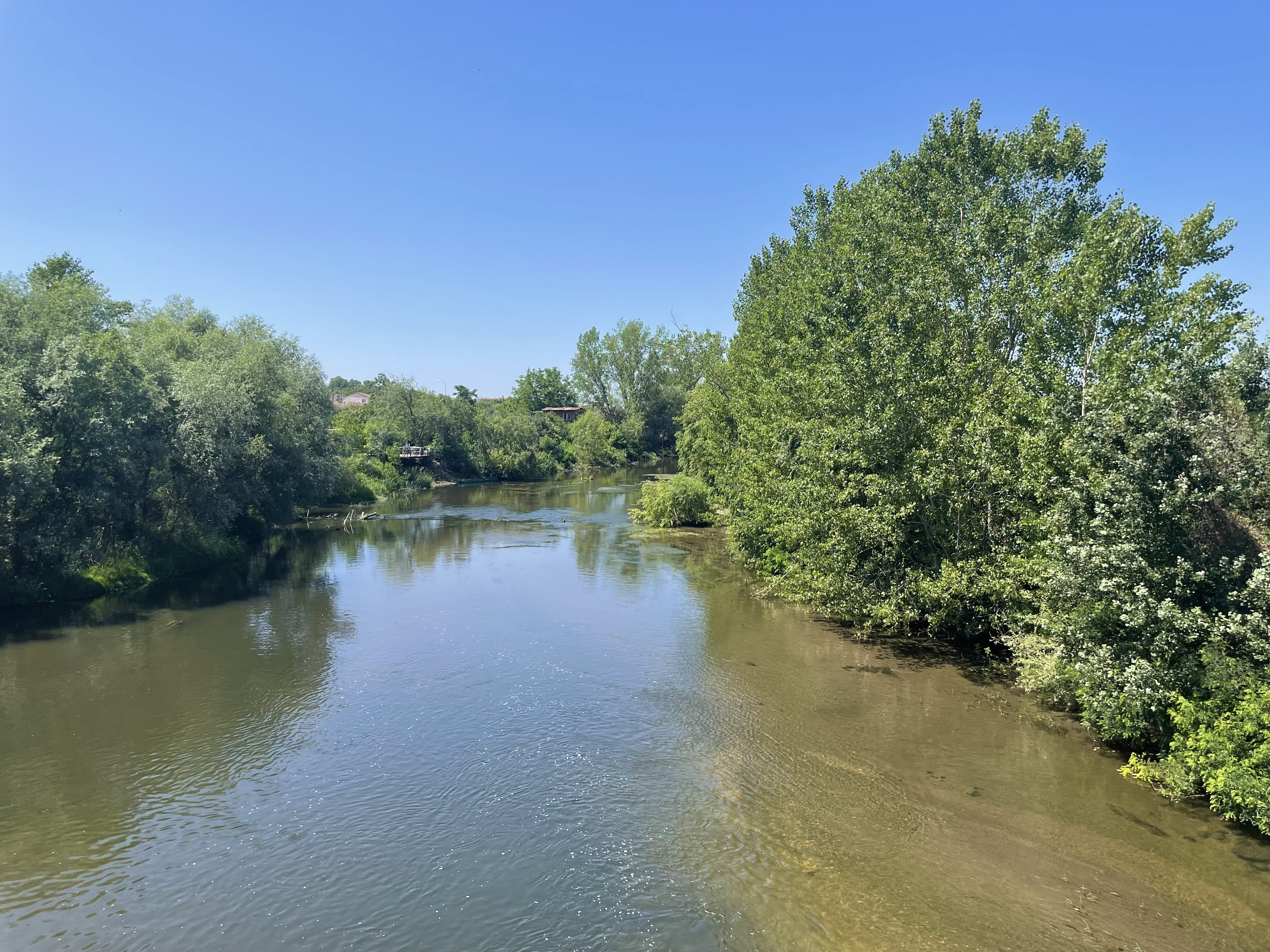
Tundzha River as seen from Saraçhane Bridge, built by Hadım Şehabeddin Pasha in Edirne, Turkey.

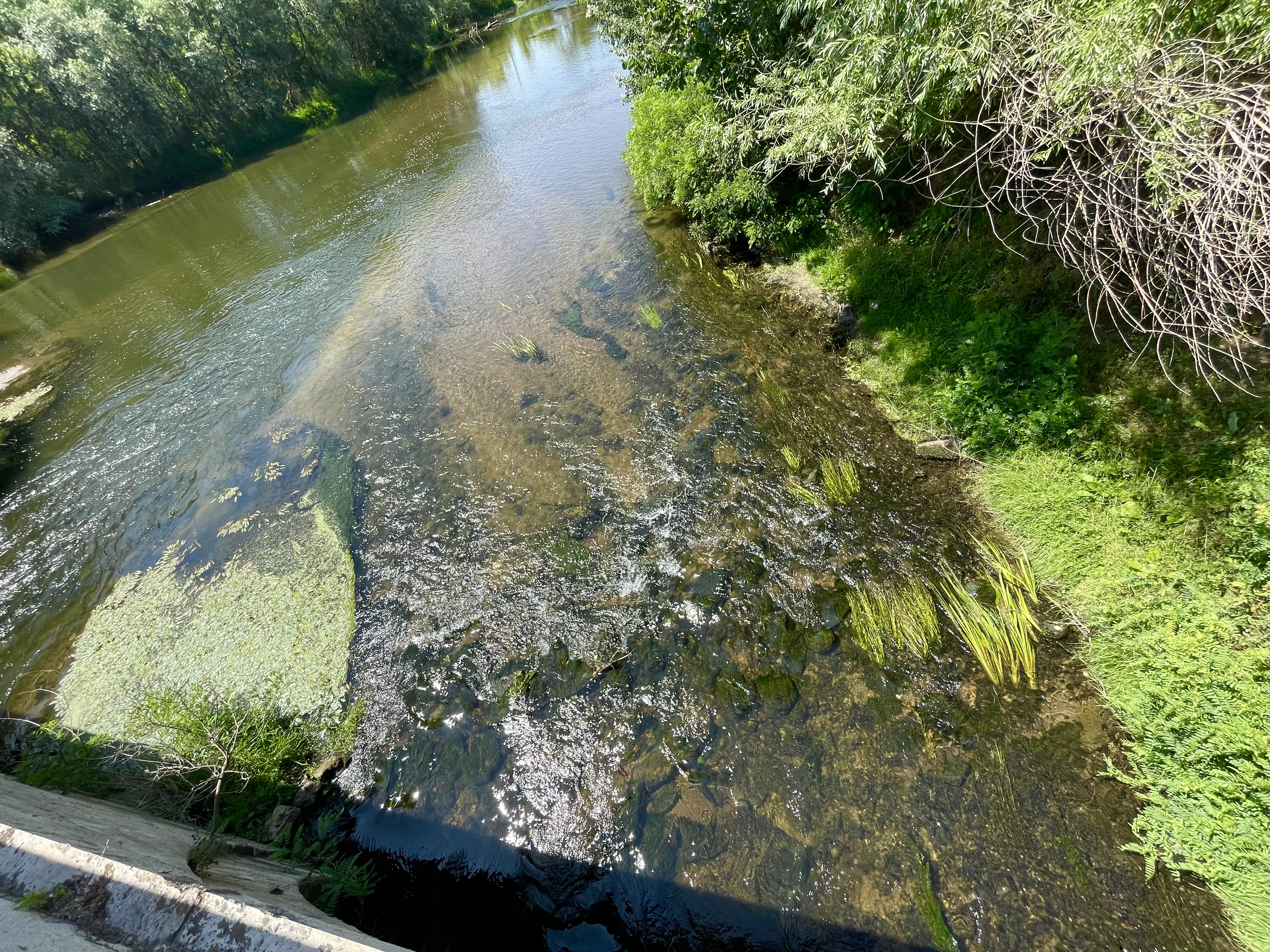
Tundzha River as seen from Saraçhane Bridge, built by Hadım Şehabeddin Pasha in Edirne, Turkey.

== Sources ==
- Балевски (Balevski), Ангел (Angel) (1997). Енциклопедия България. Том VII. Тл-Я [Encyclopaedia Bulgaria. Volume VII. Tl-Ya] (in Bulgarian). и колектив. София (Sofia): Издателство на БАН (Bulgarian Academy of Sciences Press).
- Мичев (Michev), Николай (Nikolay); Михайлов (Mihaylov), Цветко (Tsvetko); Вапцаров (Vaptsarov), Иван (Ivan); Кираджиев (Kiradzhiev), Светлин (Svetlin) (1980). Географски речник на България [Geographic Dictionary of Bulgaria] (in Bulgarian). София (Sofia): Наука и култура (Nauka i kultura).
- Golemanski, Vasil; Peev, Dimitar; Chipev, Nesho; Beron, Petar; Biserkov, Valko (2015). Red Book of Bulgaria, Volume II (in Bulgarian). Sofia: Bulgarian Academy of Sciences. ISBN 978-954-9746-19-8.
