= Musabeyli (disambiguation) =

Musabeyli is a settlement in Kilis Province, Turkey.

Musabeyli may also refer to:

- Musabeyli, Edirne
- Musabeyli, Agsu, Azerbaijan
- Musabəyli, Fizuli, Azerbaijan
