= Doyran =

Doyran, also spelled Doiran or Dojran, is a Macedonian place name that may refer to:

== Battles ==
- Battle of Doiran refers to several battles that took place near Doiran Lake in Macedonia:
  - Battle of Doiran (1913), during the Second Balkan War
  - Battle of Doiran (1916), during World War I
  - Battle of Doiran (1917), during World War I
  - Battle of Doiran (1918), during World War I

== Places ==
=== Antarctica ===
- Doyran Heights, named after Doyrantsi, Bulgaria

=== Bulgaria ===
- Doyrantsi

=== Greece ===
- Doirani, across the Macedonia-Greece border from and named after Dojran, Macedonia

=== Iran ===
- Doyran, Iran, a village in West Azerbaijan Province, Iran

=== Macedonia ===
- Dojran, a city destroyed during World War I
  - Nov Dojran, New Dojran, a village near the city
  - Star Dojran, Old Dojran, a village near the city
- Doiran Lake, a lake that Dojran borders

=== Turkey ===
- Doyran, Adıyaman, a village in the District of Adıyaman, Adıyaman Province
- Doyran, Edirne
- Doyran, Vezirköprü, a village in the Vezirköprü, Samsun Province
