= Razhevo =

- Location of Razhevo
- Coordinates: 42°22′N 24°48′E
- Country: Bulgaria
- Provinces (Oblast): Plovdiv

Government
  - Mayor: Velichka Vasileva
- Elevation: 198 m (650 ft)

Population (2006)
  - Total: 267
- Time zone: UTC+2 (EET)
  - Summer (DST): UTC+3 (EEST)
- Postal Code: 4169
- Area code: 03125

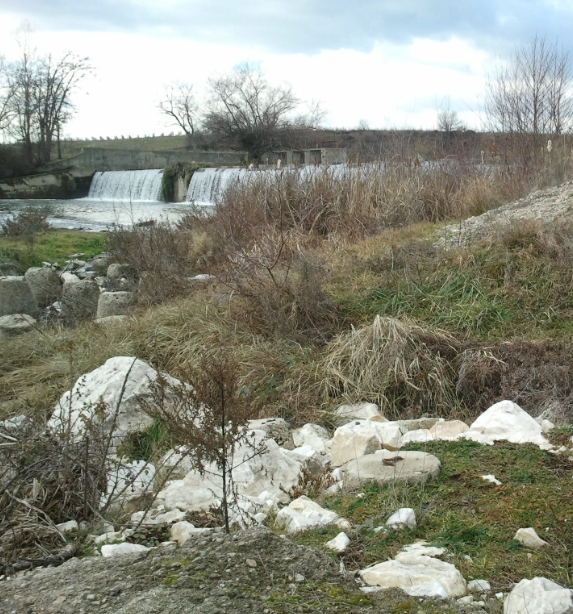
River in Razhevo

Razhevo or sometimes Ruzhevo (Bulgarian: Ръжево, pronounced [ˈrɤʒɛvo]; spelled Рѫжево until 1945; meaning "Rye village") is a village in central Bulgaria, part of Kaloyanovo Municipality, Plovdiv Province.

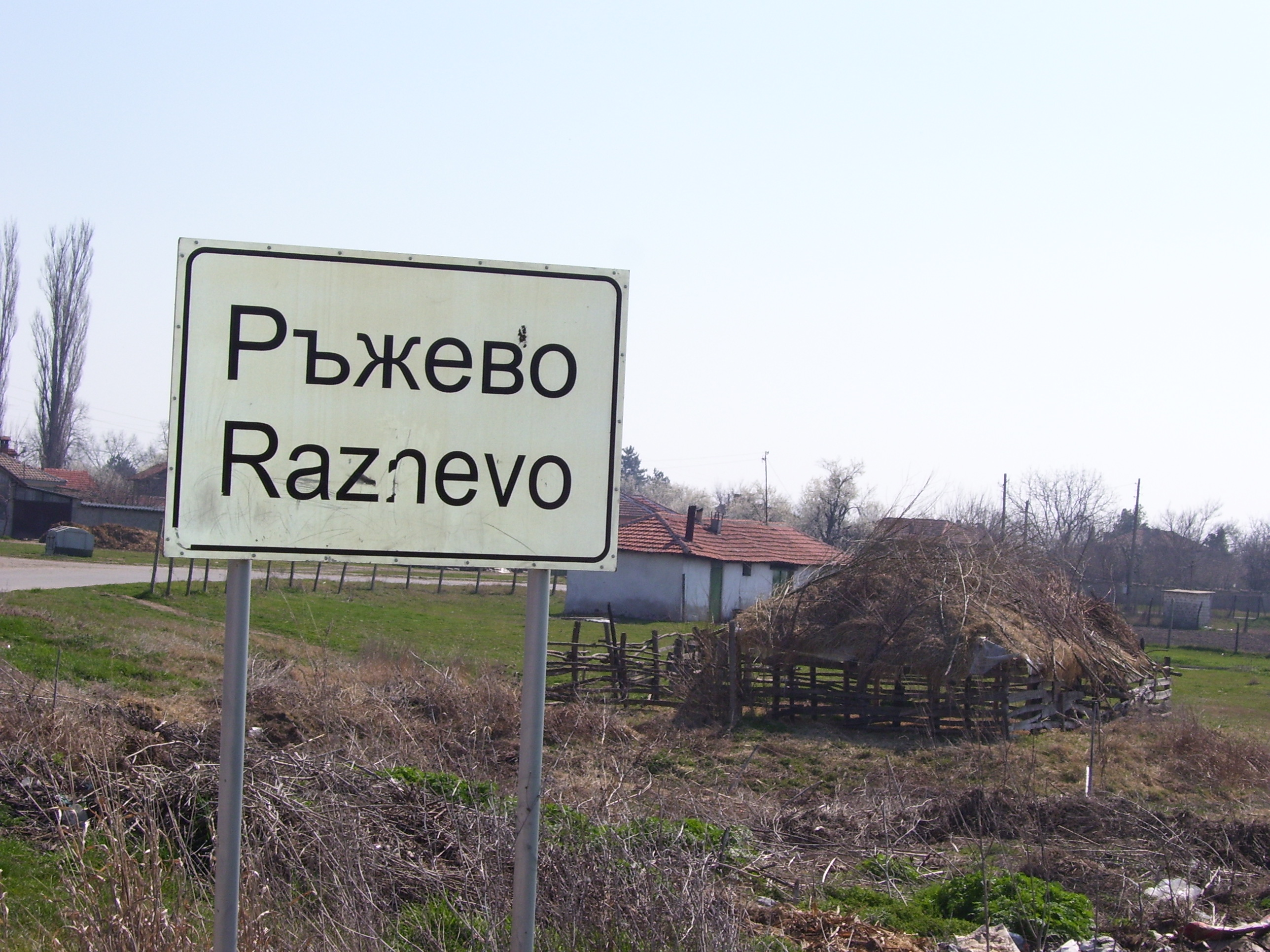
The worn entry sign at Razhevo.

== Geography ==
The village is located 30 km north of Plovdiv and is 30 km south of Karlovo. It is on the left, depressed bank of the river Stryama, the left tributary of the Maritsa river. It is in the center of one of the flattest places in Bulgaria and in cloudy weather the Thracian plain can be seen in all directions, except for the blockage of an occasional hill. When it is sunny, Sredna Gora and Stara Planina can be seen further back.

The climate in the region is humid continental, the winter is mild, and the summer dry and hot, as the temperatures often pass 40 °C (105.8 °F). The plain on which the village was built is alluvial. Near the village, the so-called "Mayor's River" (Bulgarian: Майорска река), a canal from Maritsa, runs.

== Transportation ==
Razhevo has three exits—the asphalt road from the village Razhevo Konare (3 km away) from the south, the asphalt road to the village Chernozemen to the west, and the paved road to the villages Begovo (3 km) and Suhozem (5 km) going northeast.

Razhevo has a bus route to Plovdiv—the buses come from the bus station "Sever." Another way to get to the village is by train (which arrives at the central station or Filipovo station) from Plovdiv to Karlovo or vice versa, leaving from the train station in Chernozemen, which can be reached by bus from Plovdiv. After crossing a bridge over the Stryama, Razhevo can then be seen.

== History ==
=== Etymology of the Name ===
The local legends say that the village was founded by Baba Razha (Bulgarian: Баба Ръжа, or a variant Ружа)—she had been running from the Turks. However, it can be argued that the name of the village actually comes from rye, and thus rye bread is extensively popular in the region. Others believe that the name developed from the Bulgarian word for "weapon" (Bulgarian: оръжие, orazhie) as

The horse and the weapon have characterized Razhevo even before the Ottoman invasion—the rye farmers would have been occupied with the maintenance and defense of the road to Karlovo and the nearby mountain passes in Sredna Gora.

— Simeon Bahchevanski-Docho, Прокълнатият Oтряд

A subdivision of the village Bratya Daskalovi has the same name as Razhevo. Villages with similar names include Razhena in Madzharovo Municipality; in Kazanlak Municipality, Razhenovo; and in Ruen Municipality, Ruzhitsa. In North Macedonia, there are two villages named Ruzhanichino and Arzhanovo.

=== In Antiquity and the Middle Ages ===
In antiquity, the land known today as Razhevo was part of the land of an ancient Thracian tribe. Today signs of this tribe remain in Thracian villages and hillside necropoleis. The oldest archeological item found near the village was 1 km south of the village on the right-hand side of the rode to Razheno Konare. It was a rock scepter composed of the head of a horse and part of its neck. The scepter is the first of its kind found in Bulgaria and dates towards either the end of the Chalcolithic and beginning of the Bronze Age or the early Iron Age.

Around 2 km north of Razhevo, in the Yamachkata (or Rogachev Kladenets) area, where the Chernozem-Begovo road currently runs, there are traces of the largest settlement of the tribe in the region, which existed even during the Roman period. In it, silver, billon and copper Roman coins from the second and third century, as well as ceramics were found. The necropolis of the settlement is made of 13 mounds. Another settlement's necropolis was discovered in the Dervishova Mogila area. The discovery of these (currently destroyed) necropoleis gives evidence that Razhevo was constructed on the remains of an old Thracian settlement. The second largest settlement is southwest of Razhevo with a necropolis made of 7 mounds. Remains of a Roman community can be found in the Barata area.

In the surrounding areas near Suhozem, a Roman army diploma to a Thracian named Doles was discovered. He served in Syria under Emperor Vespasian (69-79 CE), which gives evidence of the widespread knowledge in Roman times of the region between Razhevo and Suhozem.

In the land surrounding the village there are several Christian places—"Saint Iliya" near Popska Mogila, "Saint George" in the Old cemetery, "Saint Mary" in the southeastern end of the village, and "Saint Nicholas" east of the village, to the right of the road to Razhevo Konare and Krasta.

=== In the Ottoman Empire ===
Information about Razhevo as "Varzhova" or "Virizheva" is contained in Ottoman registers from 1562 and 1576. The village shows up as the only Christian village in the northern part of the large waqf of the Plovdiv Shahbettin Imaret Cami (Turkish: Şahabettin İmaret Camii). The mosque was established in the 15th century by the Beylerbey of Rumelia, Shahbedin Pasha. В джелепкешанския регистър на Мехмед Чауш от 1576 година селото е споменато като Вирижева и е едно от 8-те християнски села от 54-те села в Стремската долина.

Based on archeological and folkloric information during the 16th century to the beginning of the 17th century, rye workers established the adjacent villages Razhevo Konare and Begovo. Until Bulgarian independence, these two villages and Razhevo were the only villages in the region with Bulgarian names.

During the 19th century, Razhevo's land was a few times larger, and the division of parts of its land for the surrounding villages led to conflict with Razhevo citizens and their neighbors. In 1904, the newspaper "Prosveta" said:

The lands of many villages and cities stretch very far and enter the very villages and cities under land that has been conquered since Ottoman times...Razhevo has confessed, that around 13-14 thousand acres of land, considered now as Razhevo's land, belong to Dolno [Dolna Mahala], and Gornomahlenskata [Gorna Mahala], Himitliyskata [Ivan Vasovo], and Chukurliyskata [Pesnopoi] municipality, and that in this space, Razhevo has not one brezna.

— Newspaper Prosveta, 1904,

The conflict for the land was especially tense with the citizens of the village Karatoprak (from 1934 onward "Chernozemen"), many of which were refugees from Western Thrace, and for this reason were called "Greeks" by the villagers of Razhevo. The Thracian refugees settled on the higher right bank of the Stryama, where the soil is very fertile black soil, and the opposing villagers thus had difficulties telling their fields apart from their neighbors'. The first refugee houses were quickly destroyed by armed Razhevo villagers. In the beginning of the 20th century, the argument over the Raynov Trap (Bulgarian: Райнов Tрап) had even human casualties.

Throughout the 19th century, in the Razhevo region, many hajduk gangs under the leadership of Valko Voivoda from the village Voynyagovo, and of the Razhevo citizen Haydut Trifon from the large Razhevo family Gergyovtsi, who had a well in the village named for him.

=== In Eastern Rumelia and Bulgaria ===
After the Russo-Turkish War, and because of the Treaty of Berlin, Razhevo became a part of Eastern Rumelia. The villagers, famous in the region for their conservative tempers, unlike their neighbors in the villages Razhevo Konare and Chernozemen, did not actively participate in the political life of Eastern Rumelia or Bulgaria, nor in the resistance movement, but, loyal to their country, decided to join the Bulgarian army. There, they participated in the heroic march from the Turkish border to the Serbian border to stop the invading Serbian soldiers near Slivnitsa. During the First and Second Balkan Wars, and World War I, the villagers fought for Bulgarian reunification in the Ninth Plovdiv Infantry Regiment of the Second Thracian Infantry Division. Two citizens from Razhevo were volunteers in the Macedonian-Adrianopolitan Volunteer Corps.

In the Second Balkan War, the Second Infantry Division caused severe damage to the Serbian army near the train station Udovo and Krivolak. During World War I, it participated in the Battles of Doiran in 1913, 1916, 1917, and 1918. They also participated in the Battle of the Crna Bend (1916), and in World War II, it participated in the Stratsinsko-Kumanovska Operation (Bulgarian: Страцинско-Kумановска Операция), and the villagers fought in the battles at Stratsin and Strazhin.

During 1941–44, during the so-called Partisan Movement, the citizens of Razhevo remained loyal to the government. The Partisans Atanas Nikolov Chomakov (Bulgarian: Атанас Николов Чомаков) and Mincho Nikolov Rangelov (Bulgarian: Минчо Николов Рангелов) from Padarsko were betrayed by Rangel Dokov and the mayor of the village Lazar Chonov, trapped in Dokov's barn, and, after a short fight, in which Razhevo citizens such as Krum Vitanov Hristov participated, captured. In the small park in Razhevo there is a statue of Chomakov.

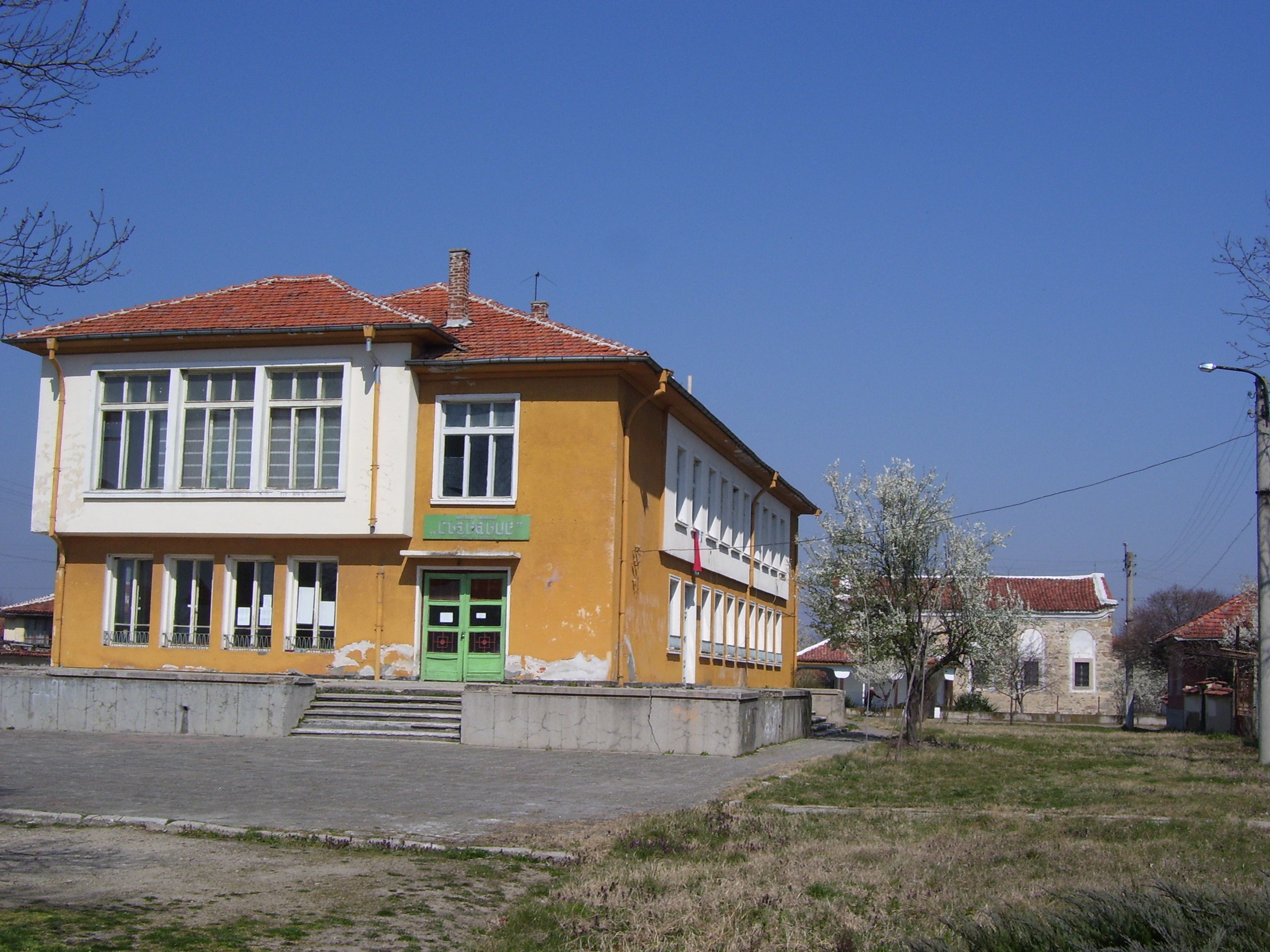
The library in Razhevo; behind it, the village church.
