= Karayusuf =

Karayusuf can refer to:

- 3800 Karayusuf
- Karayusuf, Edirne
