= Ahi =

Ahi or AHI may refer to:

== Organisations and companies ==
- Action Health Incorporated
- Adventist Health International
- Ahi (political party), a political party in Israel
- American Hellenic Institute
- Asociación de Historietistas Independientes (Association of Independent Comic Creators), an Argentine organisation
- Azrak-Hamway, a defunct American toy company
- Independent Herrenian Group (Spanish: Agrupación Herreña Independiente, AHI), a Spanish political party in El Hierro

== Music ==
- "Ahí" (song), Karol G and Drake, 2026
- "Ahi", a song by Anitta and Sam Smith from Funk Generation, 2024
- "Ahí", a song by Thalía from Valiente, 2018

== People ==
- Ahi (Biblical figure)
- AHI (musician), Canadian singer-songwriter
- Ahi Evren (1169–1261), Turkish Muslim preacher
- Ahmad Ahi (born 1985), Iranian footballer
- Elton Ahi (born 1964), Iranian-American music producer

== Places ==
- Ahi, Edirne
- Ahi, Kazan, a village in Turkey
- Ahi Beylik, a 14th-century principality in Turkey
- Ahi Subdistrict, a tambon (subdistrict) in Tha Li District, Loei Province, Thailand
- Amahai Airport, Indonesia
- Ahi Rural LLG in Morobe Province, Papua New Guinea

== Other uses ==
- AHI (Amiga), an audio standard
- Ahi (Hinduism), an epithet of Vritra
- Ahi language, or Axi, a Loloish language of China
- Anomalous health incident, commonly known as Havana syndrome
- Apnea–hypopnea index of sleep apnea severity
- Asian Heart Institute, a hospital in Mumbai, India
- Bigeye tuna, one of two fish called ahi in Hawaiian
- Yellowfin tuna, commonly referred to as ahi tuna, from its Hawaiian name
- Tiagba language (ISO 639: ahi), a Kru language of Ivory Coast
