= Babsko Praskalo =

Waterfall in Bulgaria

Coordinates: 42°43′39″N 25°1′32″E

- Бабско пръскало
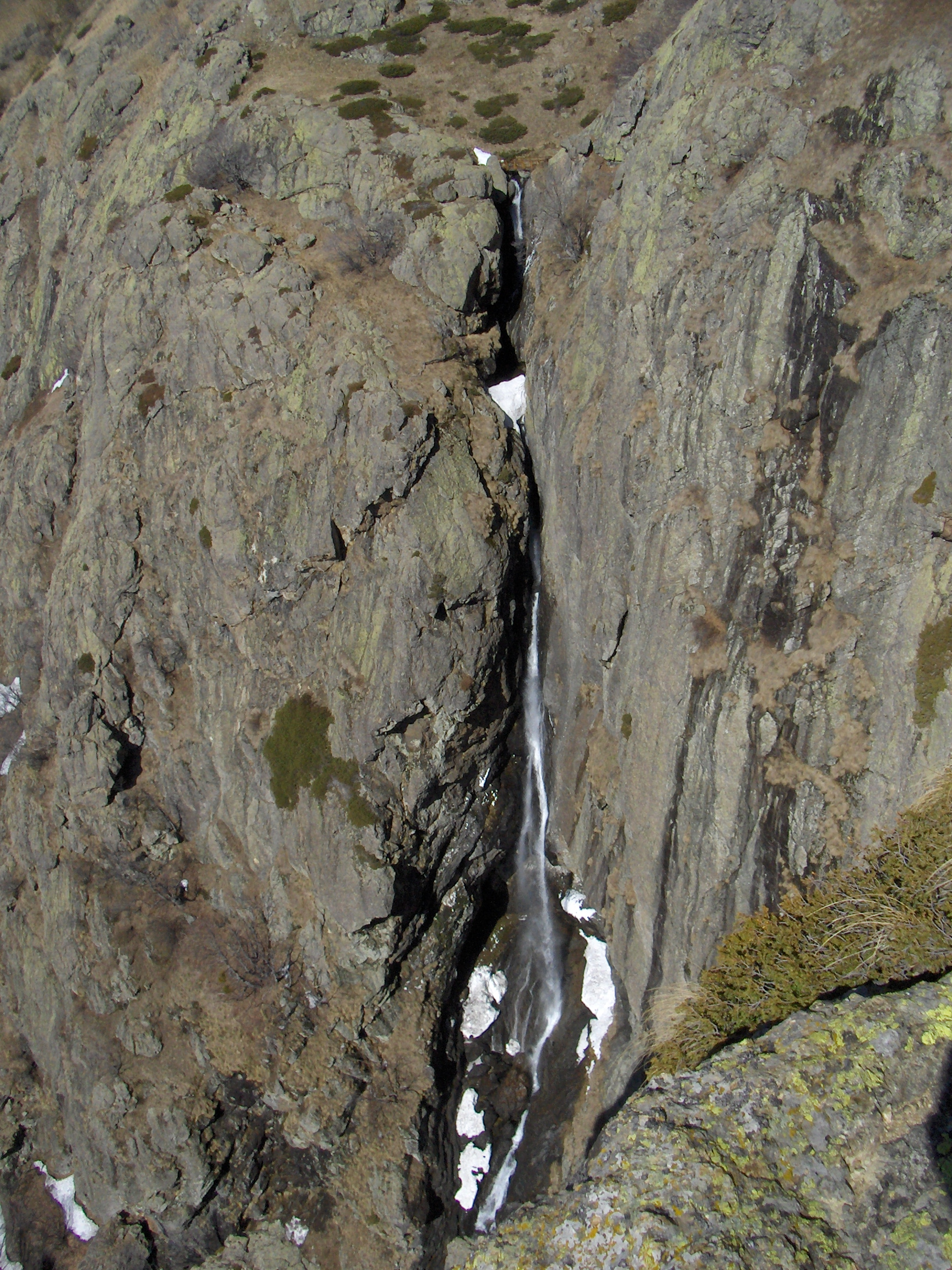
- Babsko Praskalo Waterfall
- Interactive map of Babsko Praskalo
- Location: Balkan Mountains, Bulgaria
- Type: Plunge
- Total height: 54

Babsko Praskalo (Bulgarian: Бабско пръскало) is a waterfall in the Central Balkan National Park, Balkan Mountains, central Bulgaria. With a height of 54 m the waterfall is among the lowest in the area.

Babsko Praskalo is located near the Rusalka and Ravna refuges, on the path between the village of Tazha and Tazha Refuge. The waterfall is situated on the river Babska which is a left tributary of the Tazha of the Tundzha river basin.

== See also ==
- List of waterfalls
