= Ekmekçi =

Ekmekçi can refer to:

- Ekmekçi, Edirne
- Ekmekçi, Karacabey
- Ekmekçi, Sungurlu

== See also ==
- Ekmečić
