= Tayakadın =

Tayakadın can refer to:

- Tayakadın, Arnavutköy
- Tayakadın, Edirne
