= Kayapa (disambiguation) =

Kayapa can refer to:

- Kayapa
- Kayapa, Büyükorhan
- Kayapa, Edirne
