= Sazlıdere =

Sazlıdere may refer to several places in Turkey:

- Sazlıdere, Edirne
- Sazlıdere, Keşan
- Sazlıdere Dam
