= Hasanağa =

Hasanağa may refer to the following places in Turkey:

- Hasanağa, Edirne
- Hasanağa, Nilüfer, a village in Nilüfer district of Bursa Province
- Hasanağa, Tarsus, a village in Tarsus district of Mersin Province
- Hasanağa Dam, a dam in Bursa Province
