= Elçili, Edirne =

Village in Turkey

Elçili
- Village
- Location in Turkey Elçili (Marmara)
- Coordinates: 41°27′04″N 26°37′16″E
- Country: Turkey
- Province: Edirne
- District: Edirne
- Population (2022): 309
- Time zone: UTC+3 (TRT)

Elçili is a village in the Edirne District of Edirne Province in Turkey. The village had a population of 309 in 2022.
