= Üyüklütatar, Edirne =

Village in Turkey

Üyüklütatar
- Village
- Location within Turkey Location within Marmara
- Coordinates: 41°32′47″N 26°36′31″E
- Country: Turkey
- Province: Edirne
- District: Edirne
- Population (2022): 545
- Time zone: UTC+3 (TRT)

Üyüklütatar is a village in the Edirne District of Edirne Province in Turkey. The village had a population of 545 in 2022.
