= Büyükdöllük, Edirne =

Village in Turkey

Büyükdöllük
- Village
- Location in Turkey Büyükdöllük (Marmara)
- Coordinates: 41°45′N 26°36′E
- Country: Turkey
- Province: Edirne
- District: Edirne
- Population (2022): 590
- Time zone: UTC+3 (TRT)

Büyükdöllük is a village in the Edirne District of Edirne Province in Turkey. The village had a population of 590 in 2022.
