= Yolüstü, Edirne =

Village in Turkey

Yolüstü
- Village
- Location in Turkey Yolüstü (Marmara)
- Coordinates: 41.796667°N 26.557222°E
- Country: Turkey
- Province: Edirne
- District: Edirne
- Population (2022): 257
- Time zone: UTC+3 (TRT)

Yolüstü is a village in the Edirne District of Edirne Province in Turkey. The village had a population of 257 in 2022.
