= Menekşesofular, Edirne =

Village in Turkey

Menekşesofular
- Village
- Location in Turkey Menekşesofular (Marmara)
- Coordinates: 41°46′N 26°38′E
- Country: Turkey
- Province: Edirne
- District: Edirne
- Population (2022): 179
- Time zone: UTC+3 (TRT)

Menekşesofular is a village in the Edirne District of Edirne Province in Turkey. The village had a population of 179 in 2022.
