= Uzgaç, Edirne =

Village in Turkey

Uzgaç
- Village
- Location in Turkey Uzgaç (Marmara)
- Coordinates: 41°47′N 26°26′E
- Country: Turkey
- Province: Edirne
- District: Edirne
- Population (2022): 89
- Time zone: UTC+3 (TRT)

Uzgaç is a village in the Edirne District of Edirne Province in Turkey. The village had a population of 89 in 2022.
