= Ekmečić =

- Language: Serbo-Croatian

Origin
- Language: Turkish
- Derivation: ekmečija (sh); ekmekci (tr)
- Meaning: "bread maker" or "bread seller"

Ekmečić is a Serbo-Croatian surname, derived from the word ekmečija, a Turkish loanword (ekmekci), meaning "bread maker" or "bread seller" (ekmek means "bread"). Its literal meaning is "the descendant of an ekmekci" or "little bread maker".

People with this surname:

- Ismet Ekmečić (born 1969), Slovenian footballer of Bosniak descent
- Milorad Ekmečić (born 1928–2015), Serbian historian, originally from Herzegovina
- Savo Ekmečić (born 1948), Bosnian football goalkeeper

== See also ==
- Ekmekçi (disambiguation)
