= Kemalköy, Edirne =

Village in Turkey

Kemalköy
- Village
- Location in Turkey Kemalköy (Marmara)
- Coordinates: 41.735556°N 26.396111°E
- Country: Turkey
- Province: Edirne
- District: Edirne
- Population (2022): 824
- Time zone: UTC+3 (TRT)

Kemalköy is a village in the Edirne District of Edirne Province in Turkey. The village had a population of 824 in 2022.
