= Edirne District =

District of Edirne Province, Turkey

- District
- Map showing Edirne District in Edirne Province

- Location in Turkey Edirne District (Marmara)
- Coordinates: 41°41′N 26°33′E
- Country: Turkey
- Province: Edirne
- Seat: Edirne
- Area: 844 km^{2} (326 sq mi)
- Population (2022): 191,470
  - Density: 230/km^{2} (590/sq mi)
- Time zone: UTC+3 (TRT)

Edirne District (also: Merkez, meaning "central" in Turkish) is a district of the Edirne Province of Turkey. Its seat is the city of Edirne. Its area is 844 km^{2}, and its population is 191,470 (2022).

== Composition ==
There is one municipality in Edirne District:

- Edirne

There are 37 villages in Edirne District:

- Ahi
- Avarız
- Bosna
- Budakdoğanca
- Büyükdöllük
- Büyükismailce
- Değirmenyanı
- Demirhanlı
- Doyran
- Ekmekçi
- Elçili
- Eskikadın
- Hacıumur
- Hasanağa
- Hatipköy
- Hıdırağa
- İskender
- Karabulut
- Karakasım
- Karayusuf
- Kayapa
- Kemalköy
- Korucu
- Köşençiftliği
- Küçükdöllük
- Menekşesofular
- Muratçalı
- Musabeyli
- Orhaniye
- Sarayakpınar
- Sazlıdere
- Suakacağı
- Tayakadın
- Üyüklütatar
- Uzgaç
- Yenikadın
- Yolüstü
