= David R. Kingsley =

United States Army Air Forces officer (1918–1944)

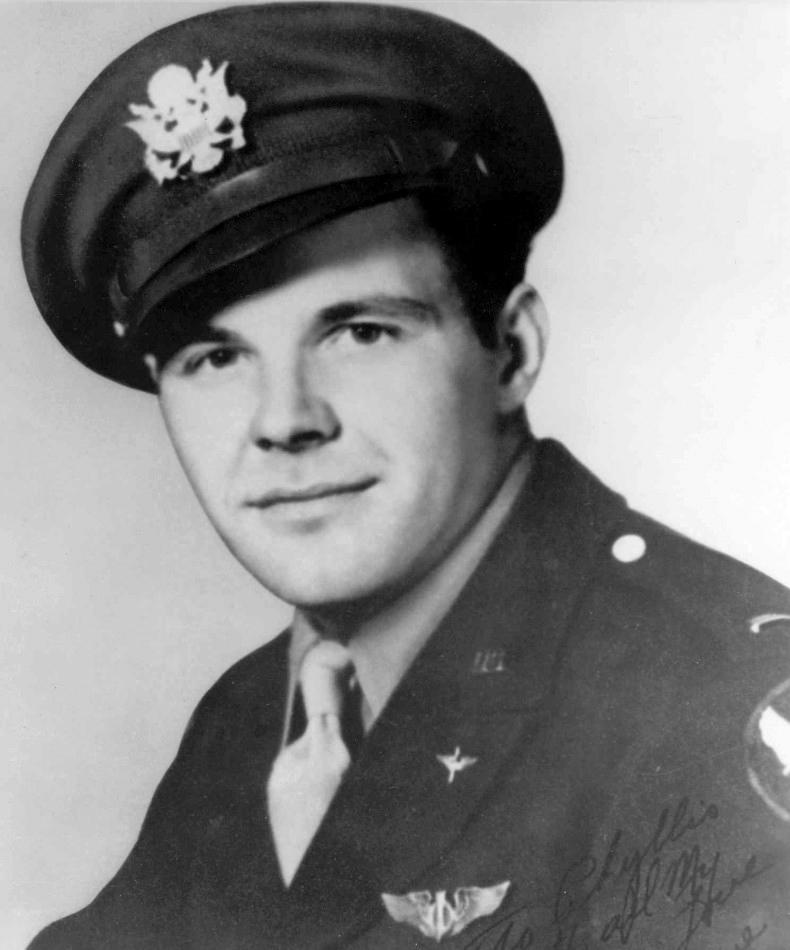
- 2d Lieutenant David R. Kingsley
- Born: June 27, 1918; Portland, Oregon, US
- Died: June 23, 1944 (aged 25) near Suhozem, Bulgaria
- Burial place: Arlington National Cemetery
- Military career
- Allegiance: United States of America
- Branch: United States Army Air Forces
- Service years: 1942 - 1944
- Rank: Second Lieutenant
- Units: 341st Bombardment Squadron, 97th Heavy Bombardment Group
- Conflicts: World War II
- Awards: Medal of Honor; Purple Heart; Air Medal

David Richard Kingsley (June 27, 1918 – June 23, 1944) was a United States Army Air Forces officer and a recipient of the United States military's highest decoration—the Medal of Honor—for his actions in World War II.

== Biography ==
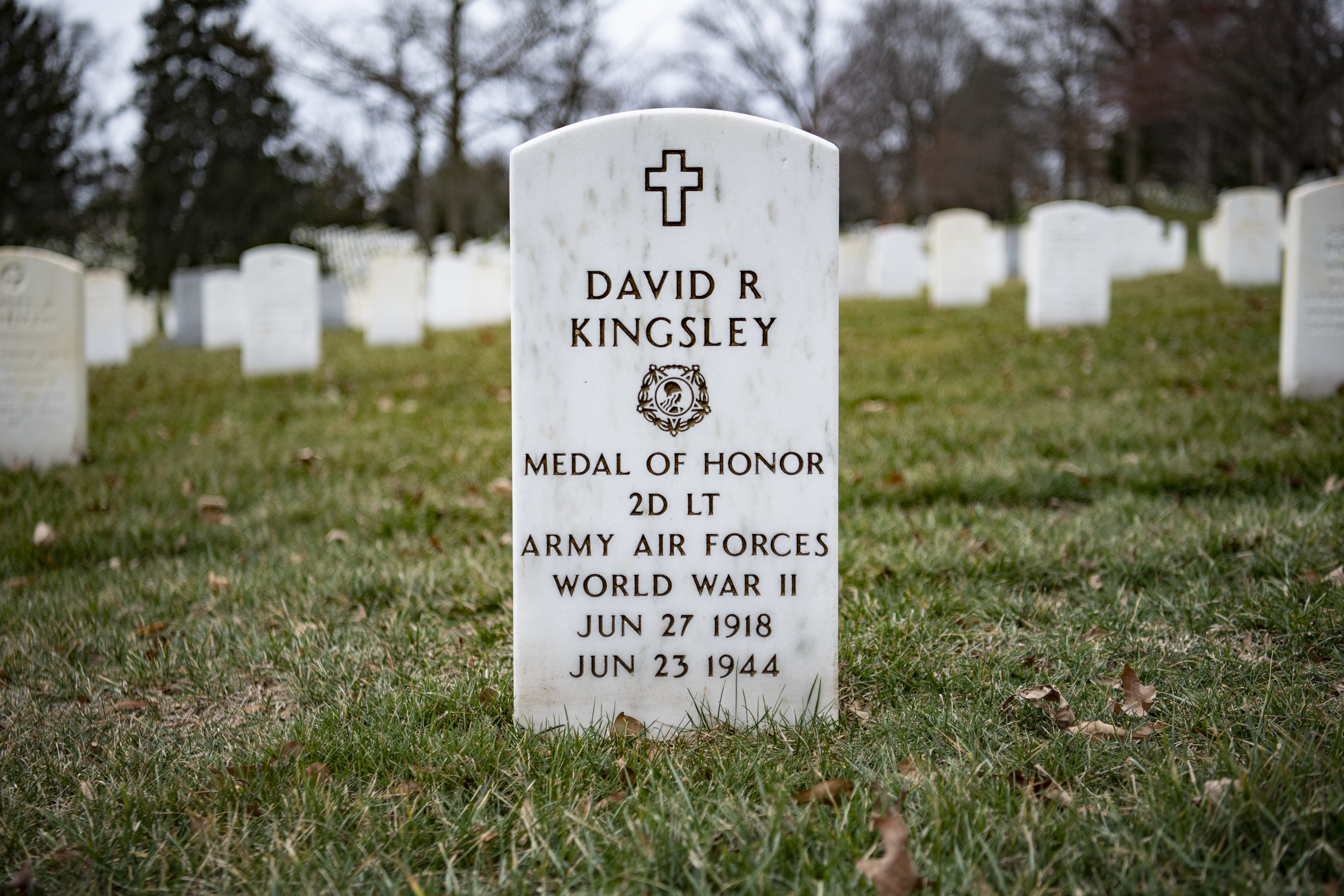
Grave at Arlington National Cemetery

A firefighter before the war, Kingsley joined the Army Air Forces from Portland, Oregon in April 1942, and by June 23, 1944 was a second lieutenant serving as a bombardier in the 97th Bombardment Group, Fifteenth Air Force. On that day, during a raid over Ploiești, Romania, his aircraft was badly damaged and several crewmen wounded by fire from enemy fighters. When the pilot gave the order to bail out of the crippled plane, Kingsley voluntarily gave up his parachute to SSgt. Michael Sullivan, whose chute had been lost. Kingsley was killed when the aircraft crashed a short time later. For these actions, he was posthumously awarded the Medal of Honor ten months later, on April 9, 1945; the medal was presented to Kingsley's brother, Thomas E. Kingsley, by Major General Ralph P. Cousins.

Kingsley, aged 25 at his death, was buried at Arlington National Cemetery in Arlington County, Virginia.

== Medal of Honor citation ==
Second Lieutenant Kingsley's official Medal of Honor citation reads:

For conspicuous gallantry and intrepidity in action at the risk of life above and beyond the call of duty, June 23, 1944 near Ploesti, Romania, while flying as bombardier of a B17 type aircraft. On the bomb run 2d Lt. Kingsley's aircraft was severely damaged by intense flak and forced to drop out of formation but the pilot proceeded over the target and 2d Lt. Kingsley successfully dropped his bombs, causing severe damage to vital installations. The damaged aircraft, forced to lose altitude and to lag behind the formation, was aggressively attacked by 3 Me 109 aircraft, causing more damage to the aircraft and severely wounding the tail gunner in the upper arm. The radio operator and engineer notified 2d Lt. Kingsley that the tail gunner had been wounded and that assistance was needed to check the bleeding. 2d Lt. Kingsley made his way back to the radio room, skillfully applied first aid to the wound, and succeeded in checking the bleeding. The tail gunner's parachute harness and heavy clothes were removed and he was covered with blankets, making him as comfortable as possible. Eight Me 109 aircraft again aggressively attacked 2d Lt. Kingsley's aircraft and the ball turret gunner was wounded by 20mm. shell fragments. He went forward to the radio room to have 2d Lt. Kingsley administer first aid. A few minutes later when the pilot gave the order to prepare to bail out, 2d Lt. Kingsley immediately began to assist the wounded gunners in putting on their parachute harness. In the confusion the tail gunner's harness, believed to have been damaged, could not be located in the bundle of blankets and flying clothes which had been removed from the wounded men. With utter disregard for his own means of escape, 2d Lt. Kingsley unhesitatingly removed his parachute harness and adjusted it to the wounded tail gunner. Due to the extensive damage caused by the accurate and concentrated 20mm. fire by the enemy aircraft the pilot gave the order to bail out, as it appeared that the aircraft would disintegrate at any moment. 2d Lt. Kingsley aided the wounded men in bailing out and when last seen by the crewmembers he was standing on the bomb bay catwalk. The aircraft continued to fly on automatic pilot for a short distance, then crashed and burned. His body was later found in the wreckage. 2d Lt. Kingsley by his gallant heroic action was directly responsible for saving the life of the wounded gunner.

== Awards and decorations ==
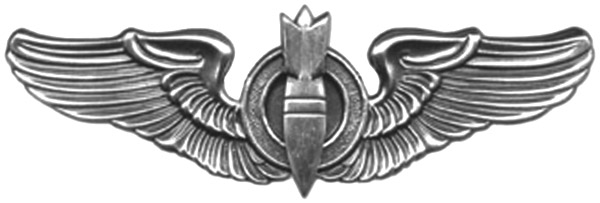

Badge	USAAF Bombardier Badge		
1st row	Medal of Honor	Purple Heart	Air Medal
2nd row	American Campaign Medal	European–African–Middle Eastern Campaign Medal with three campaign star	World War II Victory Medal

== Legacy ==
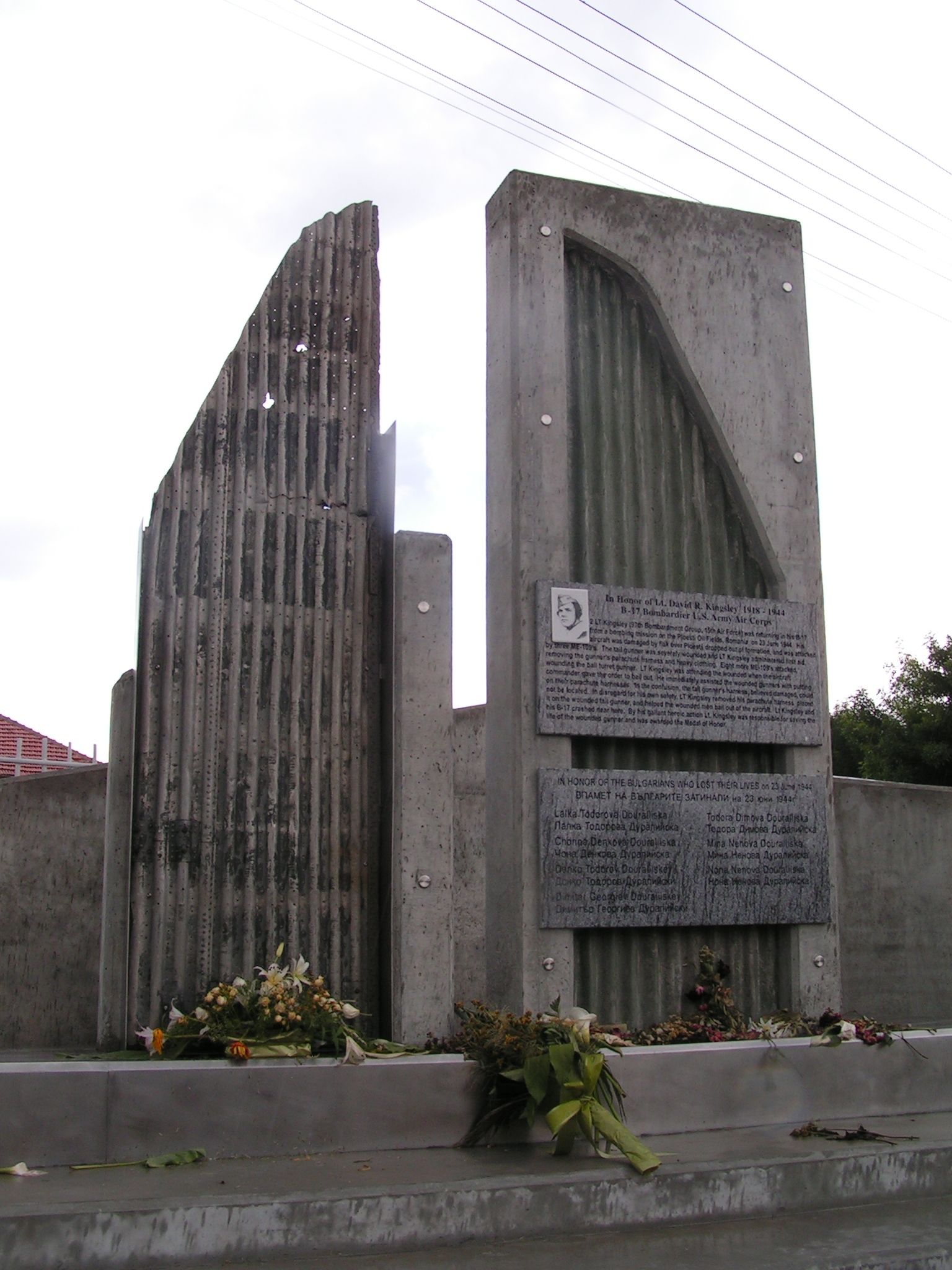
David R Kingsley memorial

The Klamath Falls Airport in Klamath Falls, Oregon was named Kingsley Field in honor of Kingsley's sacrifice. A street was named for him in base housing at Lincoln Air Force Base (now closed) where the 97th was later stationed.

Memorial to David Kingsley and Suhozem victims was built in Suhozem, Bulgaria, near the crash site of his B-17. When Kingsley's plane crashed it killed a family of seven on the ground. The memorial was dedicated on 23 October 2004 and was built using a part of his plane in the memorial. Kingsley's sister Phyllis Kingsley Rolison was at the dedication as was friends of the family killed when Kingsley's plane crashed.

In the month of December 2019, the 173rd Fighter Wing at Kingsley Field Air National Guard Base brought an F-15C to Edwards Air Force Base, California for a Heritage paint job that was used to commemorate Kingsley.

== See also ==
- List of Medal of Honor recipients
- List of Medal of Honor recipients for World War II
