= Karabulut, Edirne =

Village in Turkey

Karabulut
- Village
- Location in Turkey Karabulut (Marmara)
- Coordinates: 41.768611°N 26.435°E
- Country: Turkey
- Province: Edirne
- District: Edirne
- Population (2022): 111
- Time zone: UTC+3 (TRT)

Karabulut is a village in the Edirne District of Edirne Province in Turkey. The village had a population of 111 in 2022.
