= Yenikadın, Edirne =

Village in Turkey

Yenikadın
- Village
- Location in Turkey Yenikadın (Marmara)
- Coordinates: 41°42′N 26°26′E
- Country: Turkey
- Province: Edirne
- District: Edirne
- Population (2022): 396
- Time zone: UTC+3 (TRT)

Yenikadın is a village in the Edirne District of Edirne Province in Turkey. The village had a population of 396 in 2022.
