= Sarayakpınar, Edirne =

Village in Turkey

Sarayakpınar
- Village
- Location in Turkey Sarayakpınar (Marmara)
- Coordinates: 41°47′N 26°29′E
- Country: Turkey
- Province: Edirne
- District: Edirne
- Population (2022): 180
- Time zone: UTC+3 (TRT)

Sarayakpınar is a village in the Edirne District of Edirne Province in Turkey. The village had a population of 180 in 2022.
