= Orhaniye, Edirne =

Village in Turkey

Orhaniye
- Village
- Location in Turkey Orhaniye (Marmara)
- Coordinates: 41.513611°N 26.653611°E
- Country: Turkey
- Province: Edirne
- District: Edirne
- Population (2022): 416
- Time zone: UTC+3 (TRT)

Orhaniye is a village in the Edirne District of Edirne Province in Turkey. The village had a population of 416 in 2022.
