= Hacıumur, Edirne =

Village in Turkey

Hacıumur
- Village
- Location in Turkey Hacıumur (Marmara)
- Coordinates: 41°43′N 26°47′E
- Country: Turkey
- Province: Edirne
- District: Edirne
- Population (2022): 257
- Time zone: UTC+3 (TRT)

Hacıumur is a village in the Edirne District of Edirne Province in Turkey. The village had a population of 257 in 2022.
