= Budakdoğanca, Edirne =

Village in Turkey

Budakdoğanca
- Village
- Location in Turkey Budakdoğanca (Marmara)
- Coordinates: 41°45′39″N 26°20′27″E
- Country: Turkey
- Province: Edirne
- District: Edirne
- Population (2022): 95
- Time zone: UTC+3 (TRT)

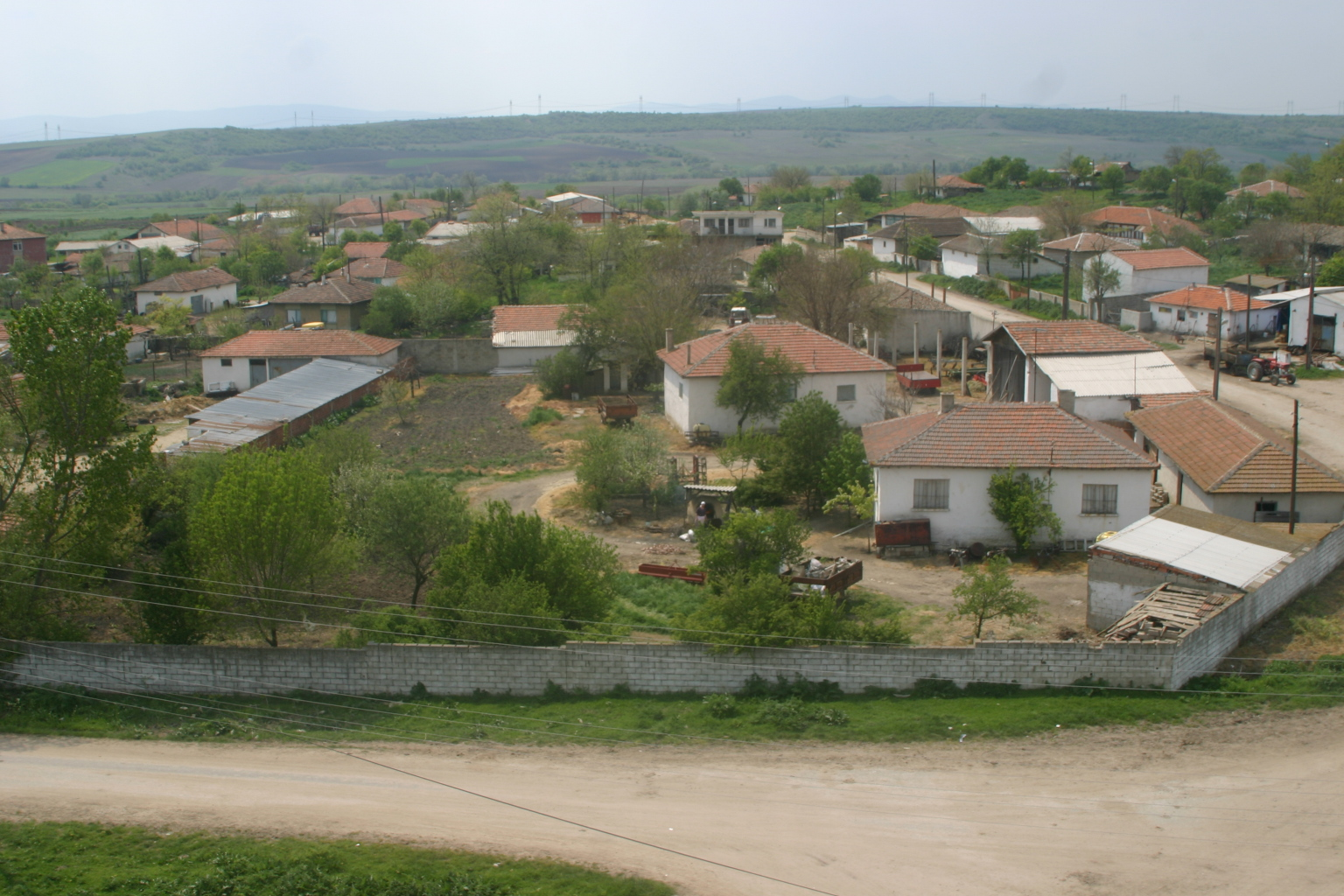
Budakdoganca village

Budakdoğanca is a village in the Edirne District of Edirne Province in Turkey. The village had a population of 95 in 2022.

== Geography ==
The village is 22.7 kilometers away from the city center of Edirne. The village is near the border with Bulgaria, and it is 11.9 kilometers north of the Kapıkule Border Crossing.
