= Bosna, Edirne =

Village in Turkey

Bosna
- Village
- Location in Turkey Bosna (Marmara)
- Coordinates: 41°37′31″N 26°33′56″E
- Country: Turkey
- Province: Edirne
- District: Edirne
- Population (2022): 71
- Time zone: UTC+3 (TRT)

Bosna is a village in the Edirne District of Edirne Province in Turkey. The village had a population of 71 in 2022. Together with a quarter of Karaağaç, it is one of the two Turkish settlements in East Thrace situated on the right bank of the river Meriç, therefore within Western Thrace.
