= Hıdırağa, Edirne =

Village in Turkey

Hıdırağa
- Village
- Location in Turkey Hıdırağa (Marmara)
- Coordinates: 41°44′N 26°40′E
- Country: Turkey
- Province: Edirne
- District: Edirne
- Population (2022): 199
- Time zone: UTC+3 (TRT)

Hıdırağa is a village in the Edirne District of Edirne Province in Turkey. The village had a population of 199 in 2022.
