= Muratçalı, Edirne =

Village in Turkey

Muratçalı
- Village
- Location in Turkey Muratçalı (Marmara)
- Coordinates: 41°48′N 26°37′E
- Country: Turkey
- Province: Edirne
- District: Edirne
- Population (2022): 148
- Time zone: UTC+3 (TRT)

Muratçalı is a village in the Edirne District of Edirne Province in Turkey. The village had a population of 148 in 2022.
