= Köşençiftliği, Edirne =

Village in Turkey

Köşençiftliği
- Village
- Location in Turkey Köşençiftliği (Marmara)
- Coordinates: 41°39′N 26°41′E
- Country: Turkey
- Province: Edirne
- District: Edirne
- Population (2022): 255
- Time zone: UTC+3 (TRT)

Köşençiftliği is a village in the Edirne District of Edirne Province in Turkey. The village had a population of 255 in 2022.
