= İskender, Edirne =

Village in Turkey

İskender
- Village
- Location in Turkey İskender (Marmara)
- Coordinates: 41.63°N 26.673°E
- Country: Turkey
- Province: Edirne
- District: Edirne
- Population (2022): 507
- Time zone: UTC+3 (TRT)

İskender is a village in the Edirne District of Edirne Province, Turkey. As of 2022, the village had a population of 507
