= Korucu, Edirne =

Village in Turkey

Korucu
- Village
- Location in Turkey Korucu (Marmara)
- Coordinates: 41.791111°N 26.654722°E
- Country: Turkey
- Province: Edirne
- District: Edirne
- Population (2022): 175
- Time zone: UTC+3 (TRT)

Korucu is a village in the Edirne District of Edirne Province in Turkey. The village had a population of 175 in 2022.
