= Karakasım, Edirne =

Village in Turkey

Karakasım
- Village
- Location in Turkey Karakasım (Marmara)
- Coordinates: 41°31′N 26°39′E
- Country: Turkey
- Province: Edirne
- District: Edirne
- Population (2022): 405
- Time zone: UTC+3 (TRT)

Karakasım is a village in the Edirne District of Edirne Province in Turkey. The village had a population of 405 in 2022.
