= Eskikadın, Edirne =

Village in Turkey

Eskikadın
- Village
- Location in Turkey Eskikadın (Marmara)
- Coordinates: 41°42′N 26°27′E
- Country: Turkey
- Province: Edirne
- District: Edirne
- Population (2022): 370
- Time zone: UTC+3 (TRT)

Eskikadın is a village in the Edirne District of Edirne Province in Turkey. The village had a population of 370 in 2022.
