= Saraçhane Bridge =

Saraçhane Bridge Saraçhane Köprüsü
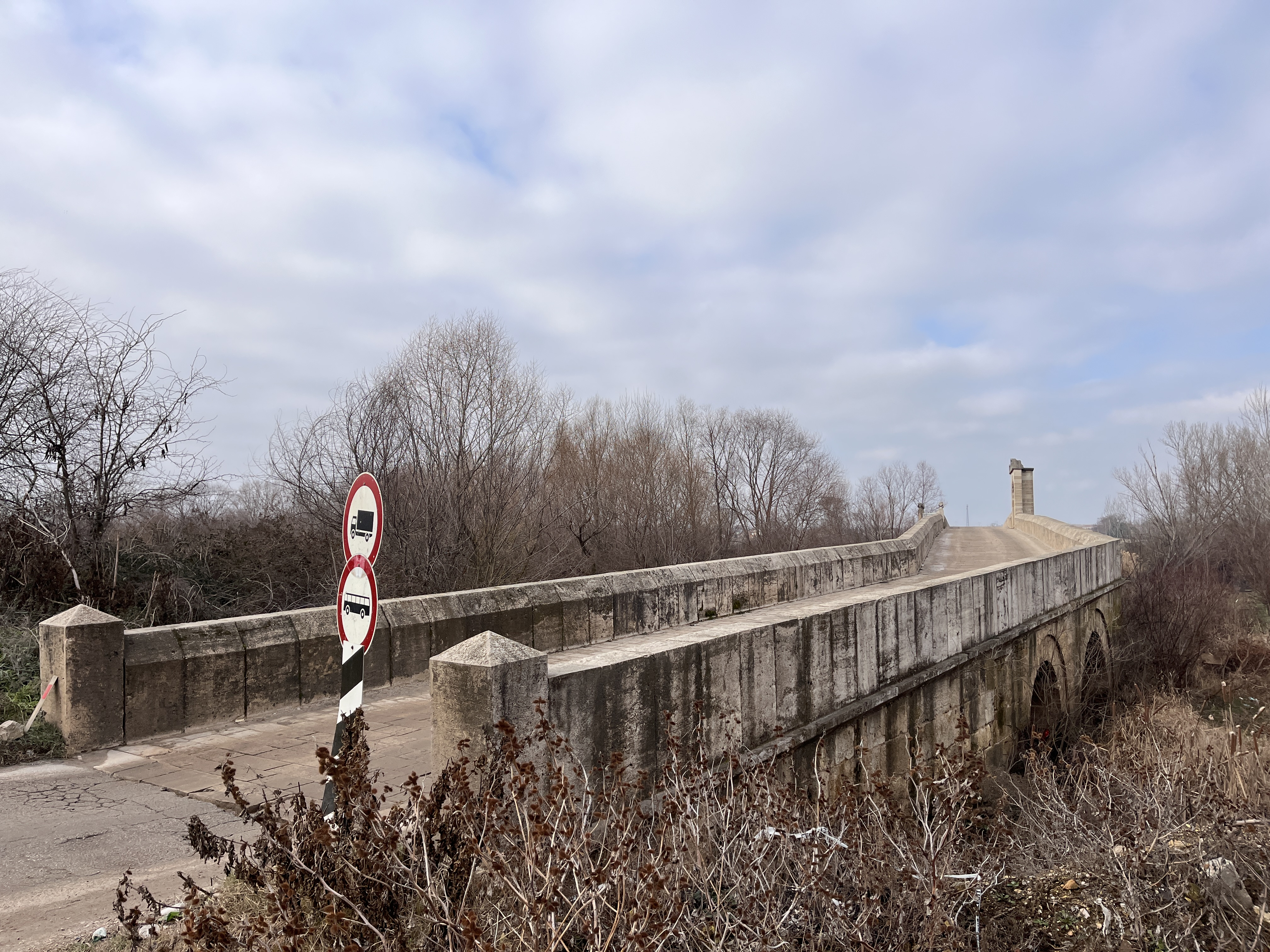
- Saraçhane Bridge
- Coordinates: 41.685561°N 26.5545°E
- Crosses: Tunca
- Locale: Edirne, Turkey

Characteristics
- Total length: 120 m (390 ft)
- Width: 5 m (16 ft)
- No. of spans: 12
- Piers in water: 11

History
- Construction end: 1451

Location
- Interactive map of Saraçhane Bridge

The Saraçhane Bridge (Turkish: Saraçhane Köprüsü), a.k.a. the Sultan's Bridge, Şahabettin Pashaa–Sultan Mustafa Bridge or Horozlu Köprüsü (Rooster Bridge) is an Ottoman bridge across the Tunca river in Edirne, Turkey.

The bridge was built in 1451 (AH 855) on the direction of Şahabettin Pasha, the Beylerbey of Rumelia in the court of Sultan Murad II (r. 1421–44, and then 1446–51). It is 120 m (390 ft) long and 5 m (16 ft) wide, with 11 piers and 12 arches. The bridge was repaired during the reign of Sultan Mustafa II in 1706 (AH 1113).
