= Büyükismailce, Edirne =

Village in Turkey

Büyükismailce
- Village
- Location in Turkey Büyükismailce (Marmara)
- Coordinates: 41°49′N 26°28′E
- Country: Turkey
- Province: Edirne
- District: Edirne
- Population (2022): 177
- Time zone: UTC+3 (TRT)

Büyükismailce is a village in the Edirne District of Edirne Province in Turkey. The village had a population of 177 in 2022.
