= Demirhanlı, Edirne =

Village in Turkey

Demirhanlı
- Village
- Location in Turkey Demirhanlı (Marmara)
- Coordinates: 41°41′53″N 26°44′14″E
- Country: Turkey
- Province: Edirne
- District: Edirne
- Population (2022): 336
- Time zone: UTC+3 (TRT)

Demirhanlı is a village in the Edirne District of Edirne Province in Turkey. The village had a population of 336 in 2022.
