= Tazha (river) =

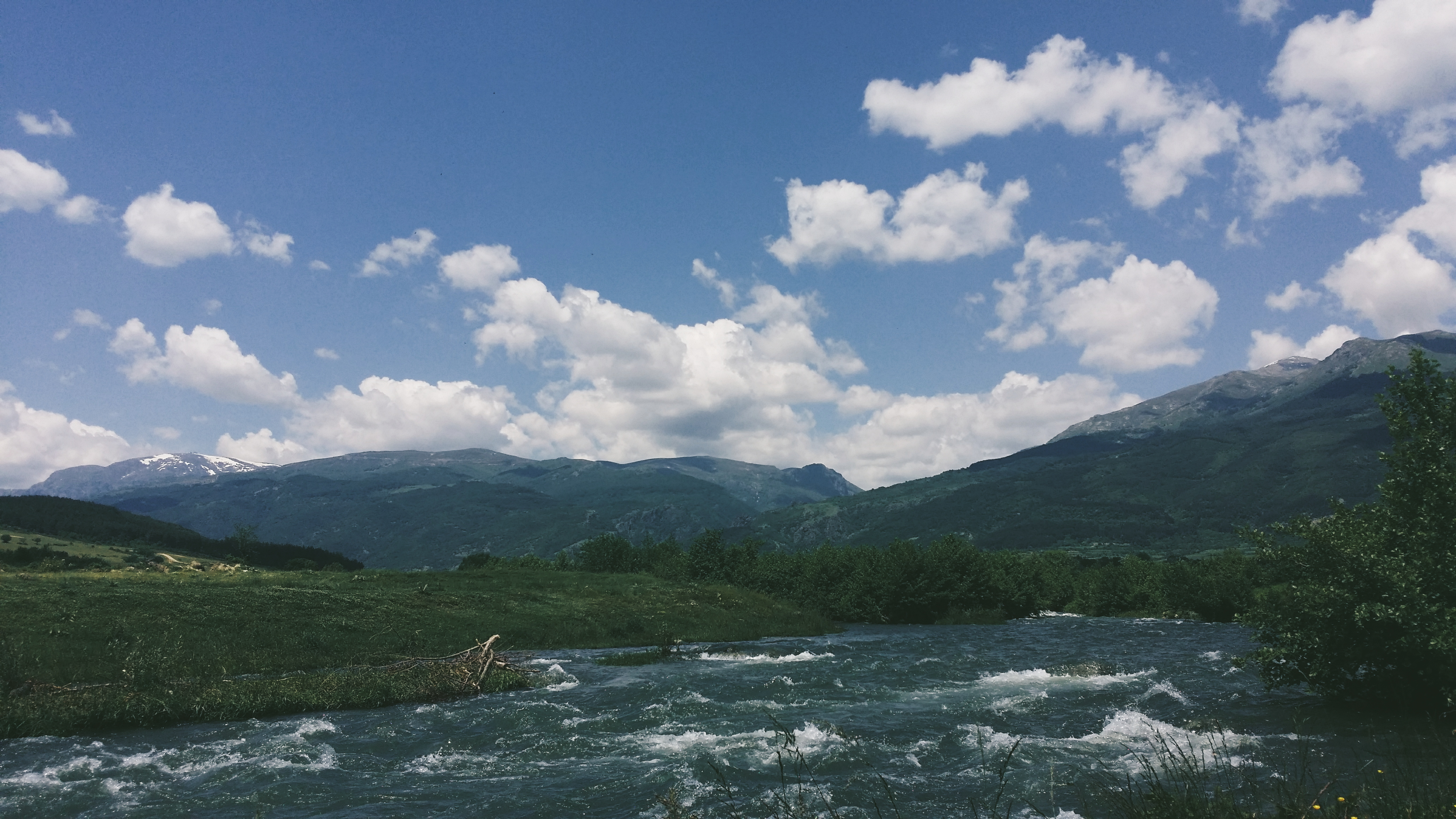

Location
- Country: Bulgaria

Physical characteristics
- Source
  - location: S of Maragidik, Balkan Mountains
  - coordinates: 42°44′51″N 26°58′18.12″E
  - elevation: 1,726 m (5,663 ft)
- Mouth
  - location: Tundzha
  - coordinates: 42°36′11.88″N 25°8′27.96″E
  - elevation: 440 m (1,440 ft)
- Length: 26 km (16 mi)
- Basin size: 116 km^{2} (45 sq mi)

Basin features
- Progression: Tundzha→ Maritsa

The Tazha (Bulgarian: Тъжа) is a river in southern Bulgaria, a left tributary of the river Tundzha of the Maritsa drainage, with a length of 26 km. Its upper course falls within the Dzhendema nature reserve of the Central Balkan National Park.

== Geography ==
The Tazha takes its source at an altitude of 1,726 m in the Kalofer division of the Balkan Mountains, at 1.4 km south of the summit of Maragidik (1,889 m). In its first four kilometers the river flows eastwards and then bends south in a densely forested deep, at places canyon–like, valley with steep slopes. Northwest of the village of Tazha it leaves the mountain range, forms a large alluvial fan, turns southeast and enters the Kazanlak Valley. It flows into the Tundzha at an altitude of 440 m some 2.3 km southeast of the village of Tarnicheni.

Its drainage basin covers a territory of 116 km^{2} or 1.38% of the Tundzha's total. The river has two main right tributaries, the Dalboka reka and the Armichalanka, as well as numerous smaller tributaries.

The Tazha has predominantly snow–rain feed with high water in April–May. The average annual flow is at the village of Tazha is 2.2 m^{3}/s.

== Settlements and tourism ==
The river flows in the provinces of Plovdiv and Stara Zagora. There are two villages along its course, Tazha and Tarnicheni, both in Pavel Banya Municipality of Stara Zagora Province. Its waters are utilised for irrigation and for electricity production via the small Tazha Hydro Power Plant.

The Tazha river valley is known for its pristine nature and offers favourable conditions for tourism and family recreation. There are beautiful waterfalls along the river and some of its tributaries, the largest of which are Kademliysko Praskalo (72 m), located on its small left tributary, the Kademliyska reka, and Babsko Praskalo (54 m) on its left tributary the Babska reka. Before leaving the Balkan Mountains, the river forms the remarkable 2.5 km long Tazha Gorge with slopes reaching height of 300–400 m.
