= Musabəyli =

- Location within Azerbaijan Location within Karabakh Economic Region
- Coordinates: 39°28′21″N 47°10′45″E
- Country: Azerbaijan
- District: Fuzuli
- Time zone: UTC+4 (AZT)

Musabəyli (also, Musabeyli) is a village in the Fuzuli District of Azerbaijan. Liberated from Armenian occupation on 17 October 2020 by Azerbaijan army.
