= Doyran, Edirne =

Village in Turkey

Doyran
- Village
- Location in Turkey Doyran (Marmara)
- Coordinates: 41.485°N 26.605°E
- Country: Turkey
- Province: Edirne
- District: Edirne
- Population (2022): 598
- Time zone: UTC+3 (TRT)

Doyran is a village in the Edirne District of Edirne Province in Turkey. The village had a population of 598 in 2022.
