= Musabeyli, Agsu =

Musabeyli
- Municipality
- Location within Azerbaijan
- Coordinates: 40°31′23″N 48°17′08″E
- Country: Azerbaijan
- Rayon: Agsu

Population
  - Total: 612
- Time zone: UTC+4 (AZT)
  - Summer (DST): UTC+5 (AZT)

Musabeyli (also, Musabekly and Musabekpy) is a village and municipality in the Agsu Rayon of Azerbaijan. It has a population of 612.
