= Değirmenyanı, Edirne =

Village in Turkey

Değirmenyanı
- Village
- Location in Turkey Değirmenyanı (Marmara)
- Coordinates: 41.761944°N 26.553056°E
- Country: Turkey
- Province: Edirne
- District: Edirne
- Population (2022): 390
- Time zone: UTC+3 (TRT)

Değirmenyanı is a village in the Edirne District of Edirne Province in Turkey. The village had a population of 390 in 2022.
