= Sazlıdere, Edirne =

Village in Turkey

Sazlıdere
- Village
- Location in Turkey Sazlıdere (Marmara)
- Coordinates: 41.610556°N 26.68°E
- Country: Turkey
- Province: Edirne
- District: Edirne
- Population (2022): 532
- Time zone: UTC+3 (TRT)

Sazlıdere is a village in the Edirne District of Edirne Province in Turkey. The village had a population of 532 in 2022.
