= Musabeyli, Edirne =

Village in Turkey

Musabeyli
- Village
- Location in Turkey Musabeyli (Marmara)
- Coordinates: 41.697222°N 26.661389°E
- Country: Turkey
- Province: Edirne
- District: Edirne
- Population (2022): 355
- Time zone: UTC+3 (TRT)

Musabeyli is a village in the Edirne District of Edirne Province in Turkey. The village had a population of 355 in 2022.
