= Ahi, Edirne =

Village in Turkey

Ahi
- Village
- Location in Turkey Ahi (Marmara)
- Coordinates: 41.7779°N 26.4067°E
- Country: Turkey
- Province: Edirne
- District: Edirne
- Population (2022): 124
- Time zone: UTC+3 (TRT)

Ahi is a village in the Edirne District of Edirne Province in Turkey. The village had a population of 124 in 2022.
