= Kayapa, Edirne =

Village in Turkey

Kayapa
- Village
- Location in Turkey Kayapa (Marmara)
- Coordinates: 41.774167°N 26.688333°E
- Country: Turkey
- Province: Edirne
- District: Edirne
- Population (2022): 108
- Time zone: UTC+3 (TRT)

Kayapa is a village in the Edirne District of Edirne Province in Turkey. The village had a population of 108 in 2022.
