= Hatipköy, Edirne =

Village in Turkey

Hatipköy
- Village
- Location in Turkey Hatipköy (Marmara)
- Coordinates: 41°49′N 26°34′E
- Country: Turkey
- Province: Edirne
- District: Edirne
- Population (2022): 137
- Time zone: UTC+3 (TRT)

Hatipköy is a village in the Edirne District of Edirne Province in Turkey. The village had a population of 137 in 2022.
