= Suakacağı, Edirne =

Village in Turkey

Suakacağı
- Village
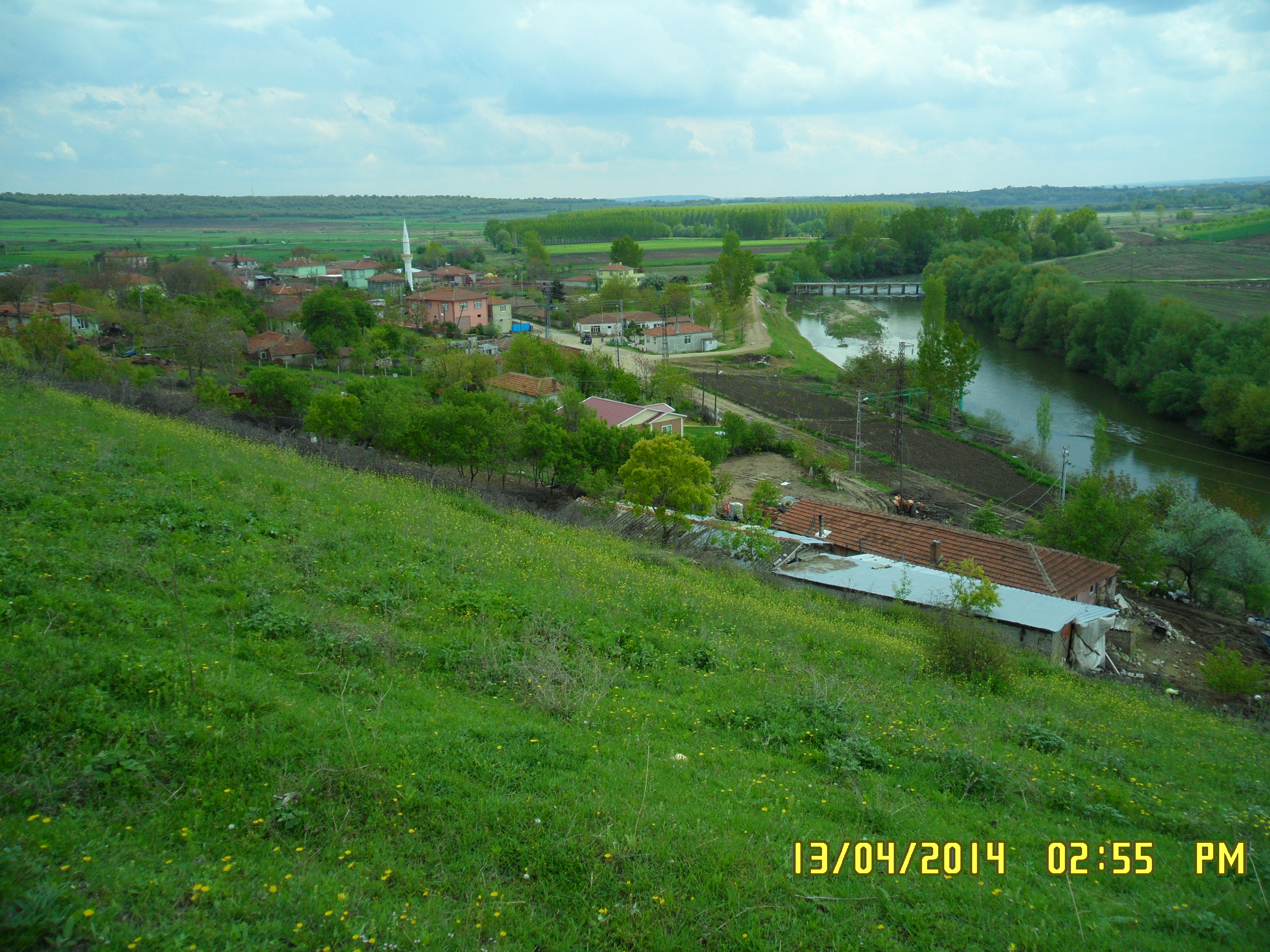

- Location within Turkey Location within Marmara
- Coordinates: 41°50′N 26°35′E
- Country: Turkey
- Province: Edirne
- District: Edirne
- Population (2022): 72
- Time zone: UTC+3 (TRT)

Suakacağı is a village in the Edirne District of Edirne Province in Turkey. The village had a population of 72 in 2022.
