= Tayakadın, Edirne =

Village in Turkey

Tayakadın
- Village
- Location within Turkey Location within Marmara
- Coordinates: 41°35′N 26°40′E
- Country: Turkey
- Province: Edirne
- District: Edirne
- Elevation: 60 m (200 ft)
- Population (2022): 1,476
- Time zone: UTC+3 (TRT)
- Postal code: 22130
- Area code: 0284

Tayakadın is a village in Edirne District of Edirne Province, Turkey. The village had a population of 1,476 in 2022. It is situated 13 kilometres (8.1 mi) south east of Edirne. The village was founded in the 20th century in place of a former stud farm. The name of the village refers to a woman; either the owner of the former farm (an Italian woman) or the wet nurse of Ottoman sultan Mehmet II. The main crops of the village are cereal, sun flower canola and rice. The village also hosts a small industrial area.
