= Avarız, Edirne =

Village in Turkey

Avarız
- Village
- Location in Turkey Avarız (Marmara)
- Coordinates: 41°44′48″N 26°32′46″E
- Country: Turkey
- Province: Edirne
- District: Edirne
- Population (2022): 300
- Time zone: UTC+3 (TRT)

Avarız is a village in the Edirne District of Edirne Province in Turkey. The village had a population of 300 in 2022.
