= Hasanağa, Edirne =

Village in Turkey

Hasanağa
- Village
- Location in Turkey Hasanağa (Marmara)
- Coordinates: 41.725278°N 26.624722°E
- Country: Turkey
- Province: Edirne
- District: Edirne
- Population (2022): 144
- Time zone: UTC+3 (TRT)

Hasanağa is a village in the Edirne District of Edirne Province in Turkey. The village had a population of 144 in 2022.
