= Ekmekçi, Edirne =

Village in Turkey

Ekmekçi
- Village
- Location in Turkey Ekmekçi (Marmara)
- Coordinates: 41.7405°N 26.4627°E
- Country: Turkey
- Province: Edirne
- District: Edirne
- Population (2022): 90
- Time zone: UTC+3 (TRT)

Ekmekçi is a village in the Edirne District of Edirne Province in Turkey. The village had a population of 90 in 2022.
