= Karayusuf, Edirne =

Village in Turkey

Karayusuf
- Village
- Location in Turkey Karayusuf (Marmara)
- Coordinates: 41.732778°N 26.695556°E
- Country: Turkey
- Province: Edirne
- District: Edirne
- Population (2022): 119
- Time zone: UTC+3 (TRT)

Karayusuf is a village in the Edirne District of Edirne Province in Turkey. The village had a population of 119 in 2022.
