= Suhozem =

Suhozem Сухозем
- Village
- Location in Bulgaria
- Coordinates: 42°25′N 24°52′E
- Country: Bulgaria
- Province: Plovdiv
- Municipality: Kaloyanovo

Area
  - Total: 15.741 km^{2} (6.078 sq mi)
- Elevation: 248 m (814 ft)

Population (2015)
  - Total: 231
- Postal code: 4209
- Area code: 031706
- Vehicle registration: РВ

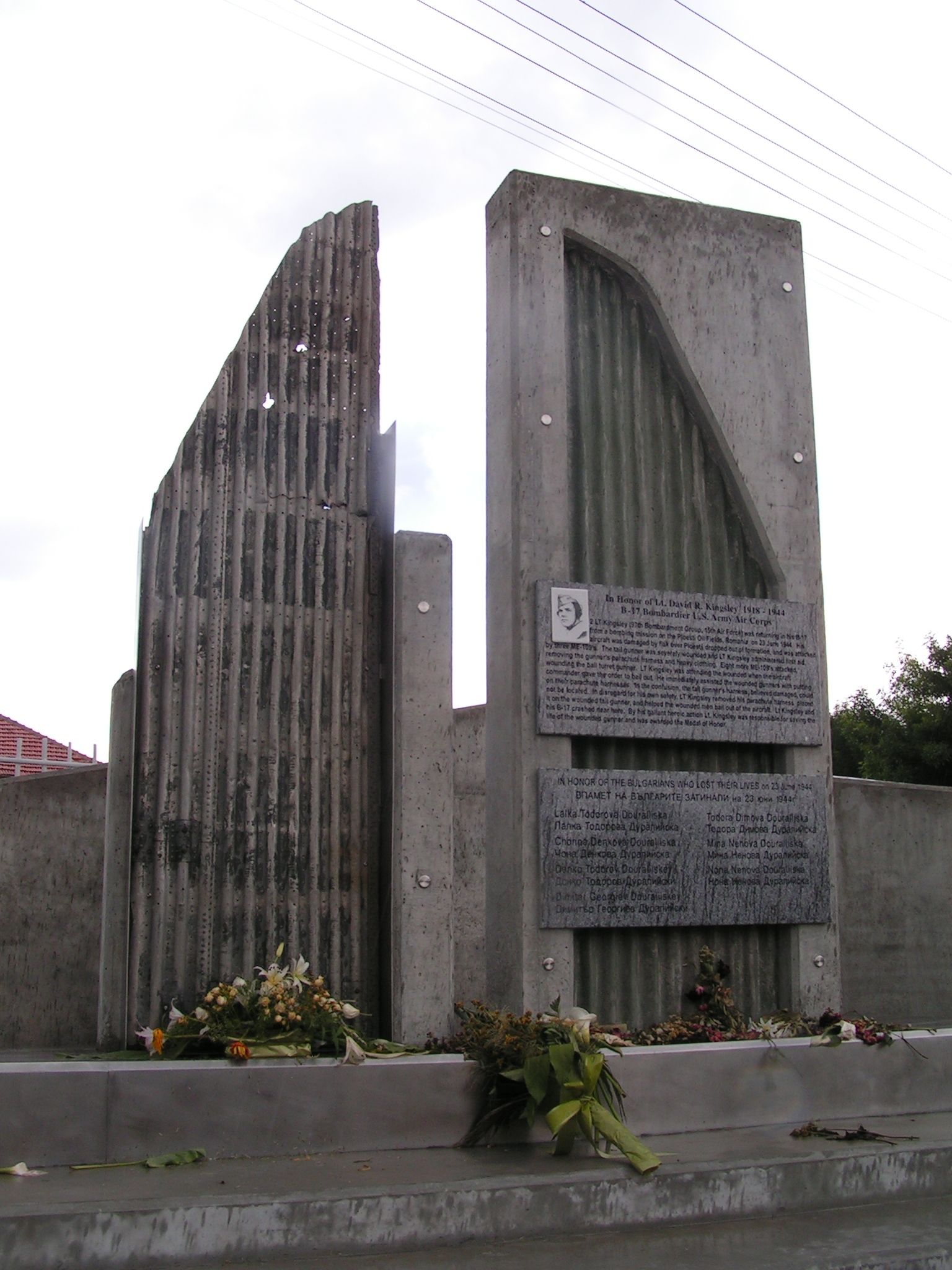
David R Kingsley memorial

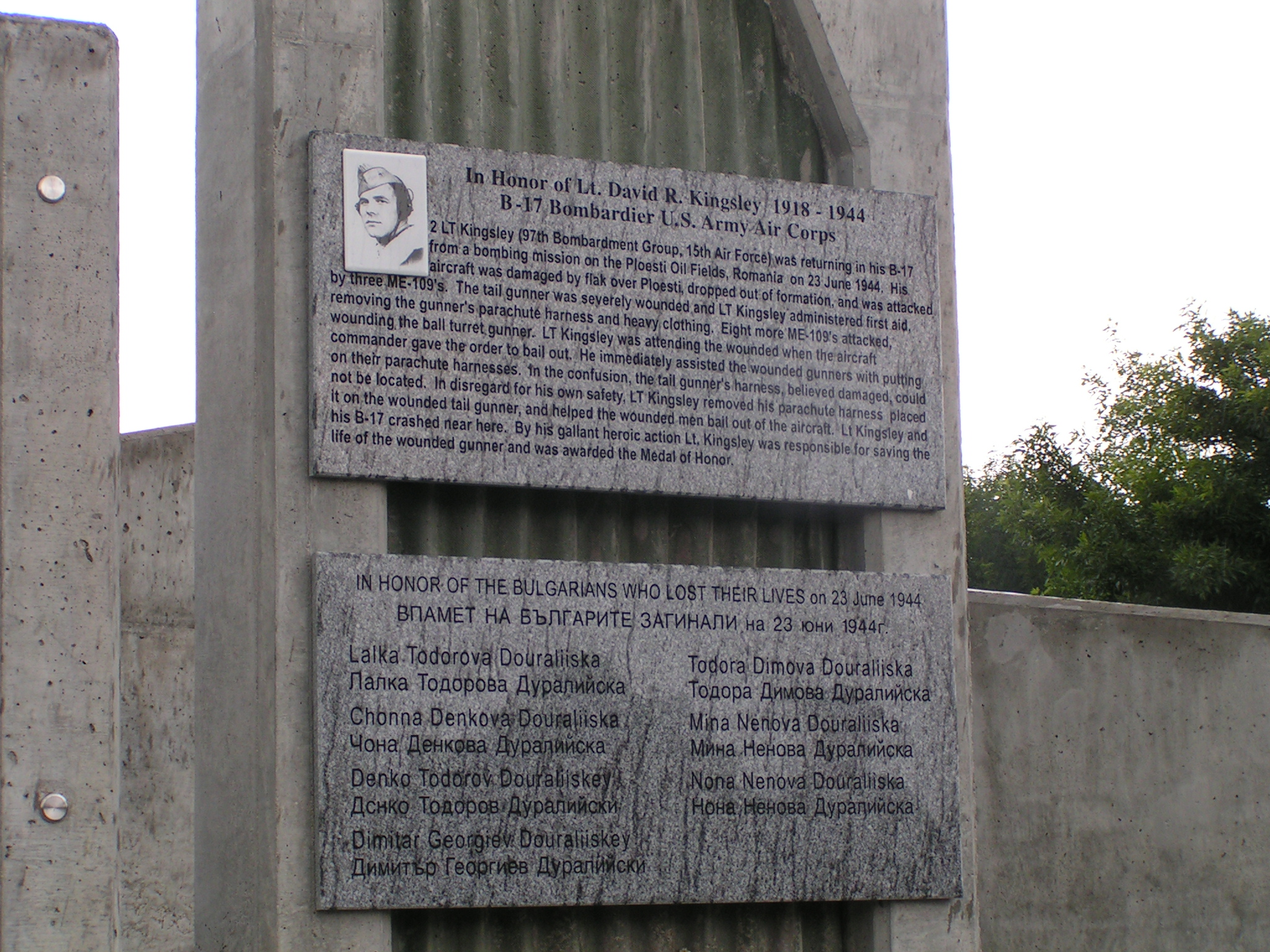
The memorial close-up

Suhozem (Bulgarian: Сухозем [suxoˈzɛm]) is a village in the Kaloyanovo Municipality, Plovdiv Province, Bulgaria. As of 2015, it has 231 inhabitants.

The village finally has got a church from 2002 when the new "Sveta Sofia" is consecrated by the bishop Arsenius.

In 2004, a monument was built in the centre of the village to commemorate 7 local people and the American pilot Lt. David R. Kingsley, who perished during World War II in the vicinity of the village.

His American B-17 Flying Fortress bomber returning from raid in Ploiești was intercepted and shot down by 4 German fighters. When it fell to the ground it hit 7 villagers who were working on the field. Kingsley, a native of Portland, Ore., was posthumously awarded the Medal of Honor for giving up his parachute to a fellow crewman in the plane before the crush.

The monument raised mixed feeling among the locals, some of whom consider that there shall be no monuments for murders because it was known that the airplane had bombed the town of Karlovo.
