= Battle of Doiran =

The Battle of Doiran may refer to several battles that occurred near Lake Doiran in present-day Macedonia:

- Battle of Doiran (1913), during the Second Balkan War
- Battle of Doiran (1916), during World War I
- Battle of Doiran (1917), during World War I
- Battle of Doiran (1918), during World War I
