= List of burial places of Ottoman sultans =

The following is a list of burial places of Ottoman sultans in Istanbul, Turkey.

Portrait	Monarch	Date and place of death	Burial	Image
	Osman I (r. 1299–1324)	1324 (aged 68–70) Bursa, Ottoman Beylik	Tomb of Osman Gazi, Bursa, Turkey	
	Orhan (r. 1324–1362)	March 1362 (aged 80–81) Bursa, Ottoman Beylik	Tomb of Orhan Gazi, Bursa, Turkey	
	Murad I (r. 1362–1389)	15/28 June 1389 (aged 62–63) Kosovo field, District of Branković	Tomb of Sultan Murad, Bursa, Turkey	
	Bayezid I (r. 1389–1402)	8 March 1403 (aged 42–43) Akşehir, Timurid Empire	Tomb of Yıldırım Bayezid, Bursa, Turkey	
	Mehmed I (r. 1413–1421)	26 May 1421 (aged 34–35) Bursa, Ottoman State	Green Tomb, Bursa, Turkey	
	Murad II (r. 1421–1444) & (r. 1446–1451)	3 February 1451 (aged 46) Bursa, Ottoman State	Muradiye Complex, Bursa, Turkey	
	Mehmed II (r. 1444–1446) & (r. 1451–1481)	3 May 1481 (aged 49) Gebze, Ottoman Empire	Fatih Mosque, Istanbul, Turkey	
	Bayezid II (r. 1481–1512)	26 May 1512 (aged 64) Abalar, Havsa, Ottoman Empire	Bayezid II Mosque, Istanbul, Turkey	
	Selim I (r. 1512–1520)	22 September 1520 (aged 49) Çorlu, Ottoman Empire	Yavuz Selim Mosque, Istanbul, Turkey	
	Suleiman I (r. 1520–1566)	7 September 1566 (aged 71) Szigetvár, Kingdom of Hungary	Süleymaniye Mosque, Istanbul, Turkey	
	Selim II (r. 1566–1574)	15 December 1574 (aged 50) Topkapı Palace, Istanbul, Ottoman Empire	Hagia Sophia, Istanbul, Turkey	
	Murad III (r. 1574–1595)	16 January 1595 (aged 48) Topkapı Palace, Istanbul, Ottoman Empire	Hagia Sophia, Istanbul, Turkey	
	Mehmed III (r. 1595–1603)	22 December 1603 (aged 37) Topkapı Palace, Istanbul, Ottoman Empire	Hagia Sophia, Istanbul, Turkey	
	Ahmed I (r. 1603–1617)	22 November 1617 (aged 27) Topkapı Palace, Istanbul, Ottoman Empire	Blue Mosque, Istanbul, Turkey	
	Mustafa I (r. 1617–1618) & (r. 1622–1623)	20 January 1639 (aged 48) Eski Saray, Istanbul, Ottoman Empire	Hagia Sophia, Istanbul, Turkey	
	Osman II (r. 1618–1622)	20 May 1622 (aged 17) Yedikule Fortress, Istanbul, Ottoman Empire	Blue Mosque, Istanbul, Turkey	
	Murad IV (r. 1623–1640)	8 February 1640 (aged 27) Topkapı Palace, Istanbul, Ottoman Empire	Blue Mosque, Istanbul, Turkey	
	Ibrahim (r. 1640–1648)	18 August 1648 (aged 32) Topkapı Palace, Istanbul, Ottoman Empire	Hagia Sophia, Istanbul, Turkey	
	Mehmed IV (r. 1648–1687)	6 January 1693 (aged 51) Edirne Palace, Edirne, Ottoman Empire	Tomb of Turhan Sultan, New Mosque, Istanbul, Turkey	
	Suleiman II (r. 1687–1691)	22 June 1691 (aged 49) Edirne Palace, Edirne, Ottoman Empire	Süleymaniye Mosque, Istanbul, Turkey	
	Ahmed II (r. 1691–1695)	6 February 1695 (aged 51) Edirne Palace, Edirne, Ottoman Empire	Süleymaniye Mosque, Istanbul, Turkey	
	Mustafa II (r. 1695–1703)	29 December 1703 (aged 39) Topkapı Palace, Istanbul, Ottoman Empire	Tomb of Turhan Sultan, New Mosque, Istanbul, Turkey	
	Ahmed III (r. 1703–1730)	1 July 1736 (aged 62) Topkapı Palace, Istanbul, Ottoman Empire	Tomb of Turhan Sultan, New Mosque, Istanbul, Turkey	
	Mahmud I (r. 1730–1754)	13 December 1754 (aged 58) Topkapı Palace, Istanbul, Ottoman Empire	Tomb of Turhan Sultan, New Mosque, Istanbul, Turkey	
	Osman III (r. 1754–1757)	30 October 1757 (aged 58) Topkapı Palace, Istanbul, Ottoman Empire	Tomb of Turhan Sultan, New Mosque, Istanbul, Turkey	
	Mustafa III (r. 1757–1774)	21 January 1774 (aged 56) Topkapı Palace, Istanbul, Ottoman Empire	Laleli Mosque, Istanbul, Turkey	
	Abdul Hamid I (r. 1774–1789)	7 April 1789 (aged 64) Topkapı Palace, Istanbul, Ottoman Empire	Tomb of Abdul Hamid I, Istanbul, Turkey	
	Selim III (r. 1789–1807)	28 July 1808 (aged 46) Topkapı Palace, Istanbul, Ottoman Empire	Laleli Mosque, Istanbul, Turkey	
	Mustafa IV (r. 1807–1808)	16 November 1808 (aged 29) Topkapı Palace, Istanbul, Ottoman Empire	Tomb of Abdul Hamid I, Istanbul, Turkey	
	Mahmud II (r. 1808–1839)	1 July 1839 (aged 53) Üsküdar, Istanbul, Ottoman Empire	Tomb of Mahmud II, Istanbul, Turkey	
	Abdülmecid I (r. 1839–1861)	25 June 1861 (aged 38) Ihlamur Pavilion, Beşiktaş, Istanbul, Ottoman Empire	Yavuz Selim Mosque, Istanbul, Turkey	
	Abdulaziz (r. 1861–1876)	4 June 1876 (aged 46) Feriye Palace, Beşiktaş, Istanbul, Ottoman Empire	Tomb of Mahmud II, Istanbul, Turkey	
	Murad V (1876)	29 August 1904 (aged 63) Çırağan Palace, Beşiktaş, Istanbul, Ottoman Empire	Tomb of Turhan Sultan, New Mosque, Istanbul, Turkey	
	Abdul Hamid II (r. 1876–1909)	10 February 1918 (aged 75) Beylerbeyi Palace, Üsküdar, Istanbul, Ottoman Empire	Tomb of Mahmud II, Istanbul, Turkey	
	Mehmed V (r. 1909–1918)	3 July 1918 (aged 73) Yıldız Palace, Beşiktaş, Istanbul, Ottoman Empire	Tomb of Sultan Reşad, Istanbul, Turkey	
	Mehmed VI (r. 1918–1922)	16 May 1926 (aged 65) Sanremo, Kingdom of Italy	Sulaymaniyya Takiyya, Damascus, Syria	

== See also ==
- List of burial places of presidents of Turkey
