= Bostanlı =

Bostanlı can refer to:

- Bostanlı, Havsa
- Bostanlı, Kahta
- Bostanlı, Kızılırmak
- Bostanlı İskele (Tram İzmir)
- Bostanlı Open-air Archaeological Museum
