= Salimiyya Takiyya =

Takiyya in Damascus, Syria

- جامع الشيخ محي الدين بن عربي التكية السليمية
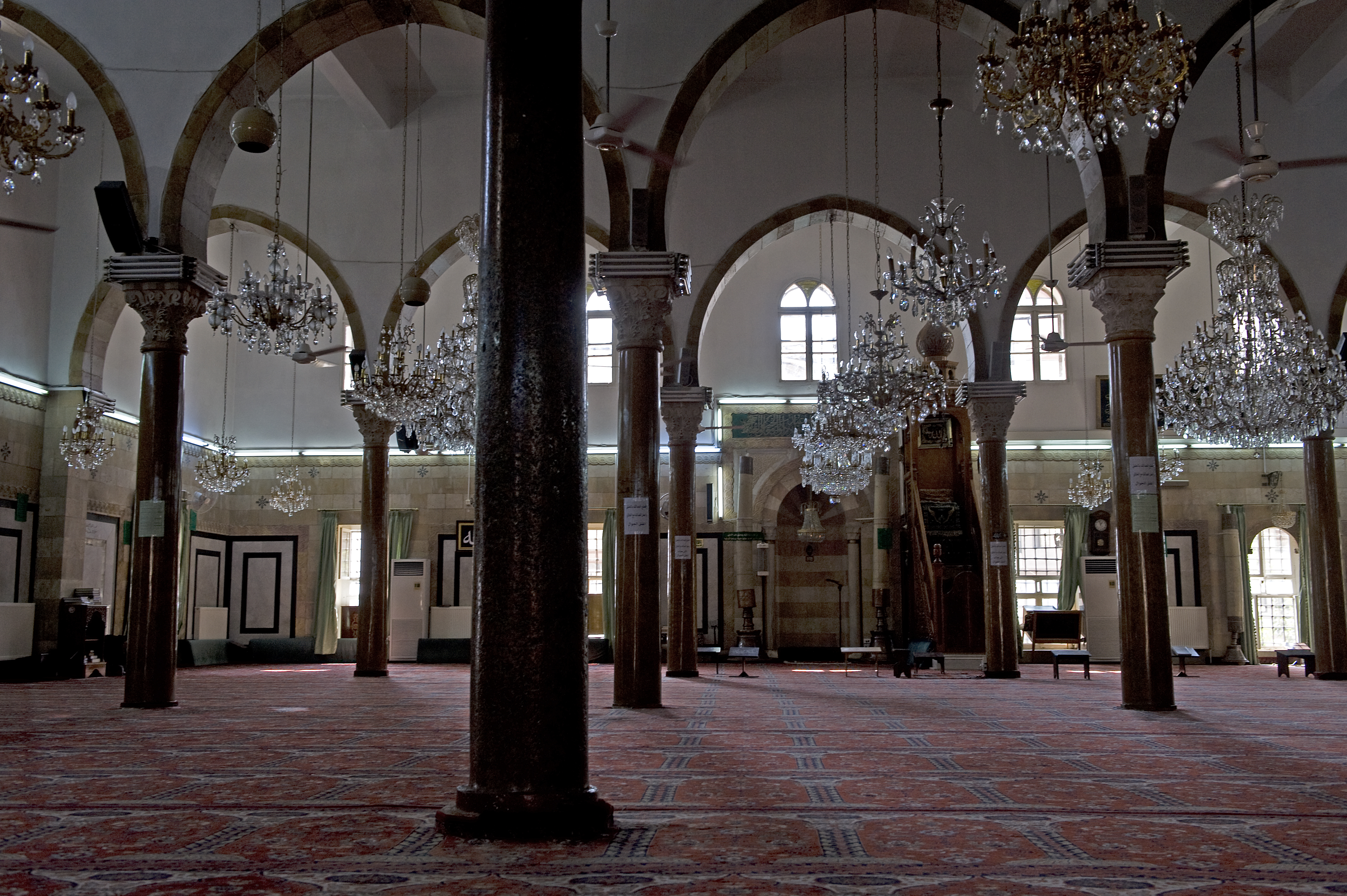
- Salimiyya Takiyya in 2008

- Location of the takiyya in Damascus

Religion
- Affiliation: Sunni Islam
- Sect: Sufism
- Ecclesiastical or organisational status: Takiyya (or mosque); Mausoleum
- Status: Active

Location
- Location: as-Salihiyya, Damascus
- Country: Syria
- Interactive map of Salimiyya Takiyya
- Coordinates: 33°31′46″N 36°17′17″E

Architecture
- Type: Takiyya
- Style: Local idiom
- Completed: 924 AH (1518/1519 CE)

Specifications
- Minaret: 1
- Shrine: 1: (Ibn 'Arabi)

The Salimiyya Takiyya (Arabic: التكية السليمية, romanized: at-Takiyya as-Salīmiyya), also known as the Ibn Arabi Mosque (Arabic: جامع الشيخ محي الدين بن عربي, romanized: Jāmiʿ al-Šaykh Muḥyī d-Dīn ibn ʿArabī), was established as a takiyya (an institution to serve pilgrims and the poor, providing communal meals through a soup kitchen as well as residential accommodation). It is located in as-Salihiyya, Damascus.

The complex was built over and in the surroundings of Ibn Arabi's tomb in 924 AH (1518/1519 CE) by the Ottoman sultan Selim I upon his return from the conquest of Egypt. The Salimiyya Takiyya is considered to have been "the first Ottoman building in Syria". However, its construction is considered to have followed "a local architectural idiom", which was "neither Mamluk, nor Ottoman" (unlike the later Sulaymaniyya Takiyya, which marked the introduction of the Ottoman architectural style to Damascus). (Note: As worded by Helen Pfeifer, "the urban fabric [of Damascus] did not acquire an Ottoman stamp until the middle of the sixteenth century".)

The Salimiyya Takiyya consists of the Ibn Arabi Mosque and an imaret (or soup kitchen) facing it.

== History ==
Quoting Steve Tamari:

After returning from the conquest of Egypt in 1518, Selim I (r. 1512–20) commissioned the first Ottoman building in Syria, al-Takiyya al-Salimiyya, a Sufi retreat and mosque complex at the tomb of the Sufi master Muhyi al-Din Ibn al-ʿArabi (d. 1240) in the Salihiyya suburb north of Damascus proper. According to historians of the period, it was the center of educational life in Salihiyya, which itself was filled with Ayyubid- and Mamluk-era madrasas and was home to many of the city’s most prominent scholars. In fact, in the eighteenth century, al-Salimiyya ranked only behind the Umayyad Mosque and al-Sulaymaniyya al-Bar[r]aniyya as the third most important teaching institution in the city. In the sixteenth and seventeenth centuries, those who held the position of mudarris at the al-Salimiyya were closely tied to imperial power. The original nazir of the waqf was Turkish and a commission established to oversee construction was made up of the chief judge in Damascus and the sultan’s tutor. Yusuf Abi al-Fatah (d. 1646–47), for example, was imam to two sultans before returning to his home of Damascus and teaching at al-Salimiyya. During the eighteenth century, the teaching position was practically the preserve of two families, the Nabulusi and Mahasini families. Both were also prominent in the Salihiyya neighborhood. By this time, al-Salimiyya was eclipsed by al-Sulaymaniyya al-Bar[r]aniyya which became the preserve of the Hanafi mufti of Damascus.

== Gallery ==
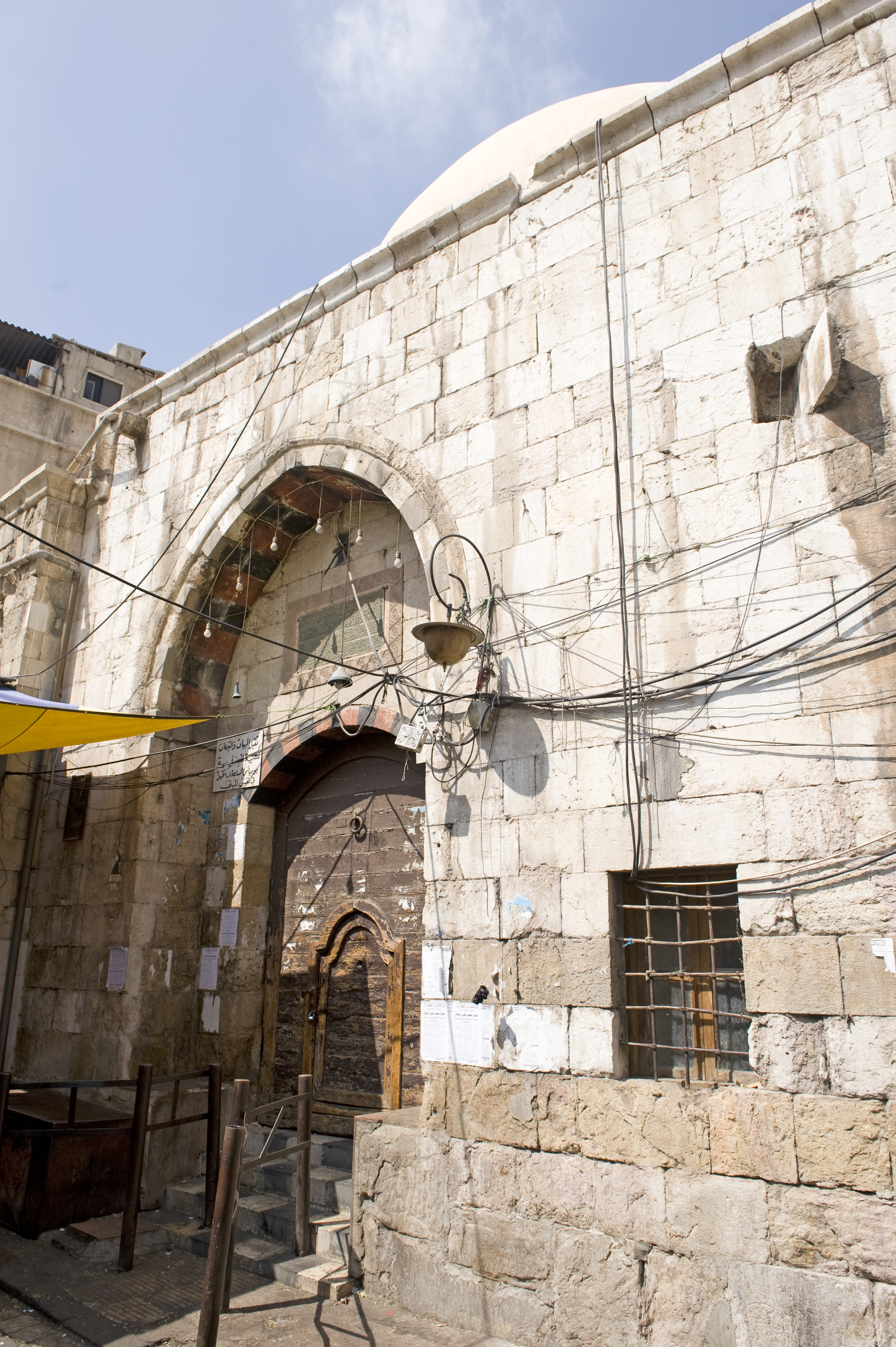
Exterior view of adjacent the imaret of Sultan Salim at Salihiyya

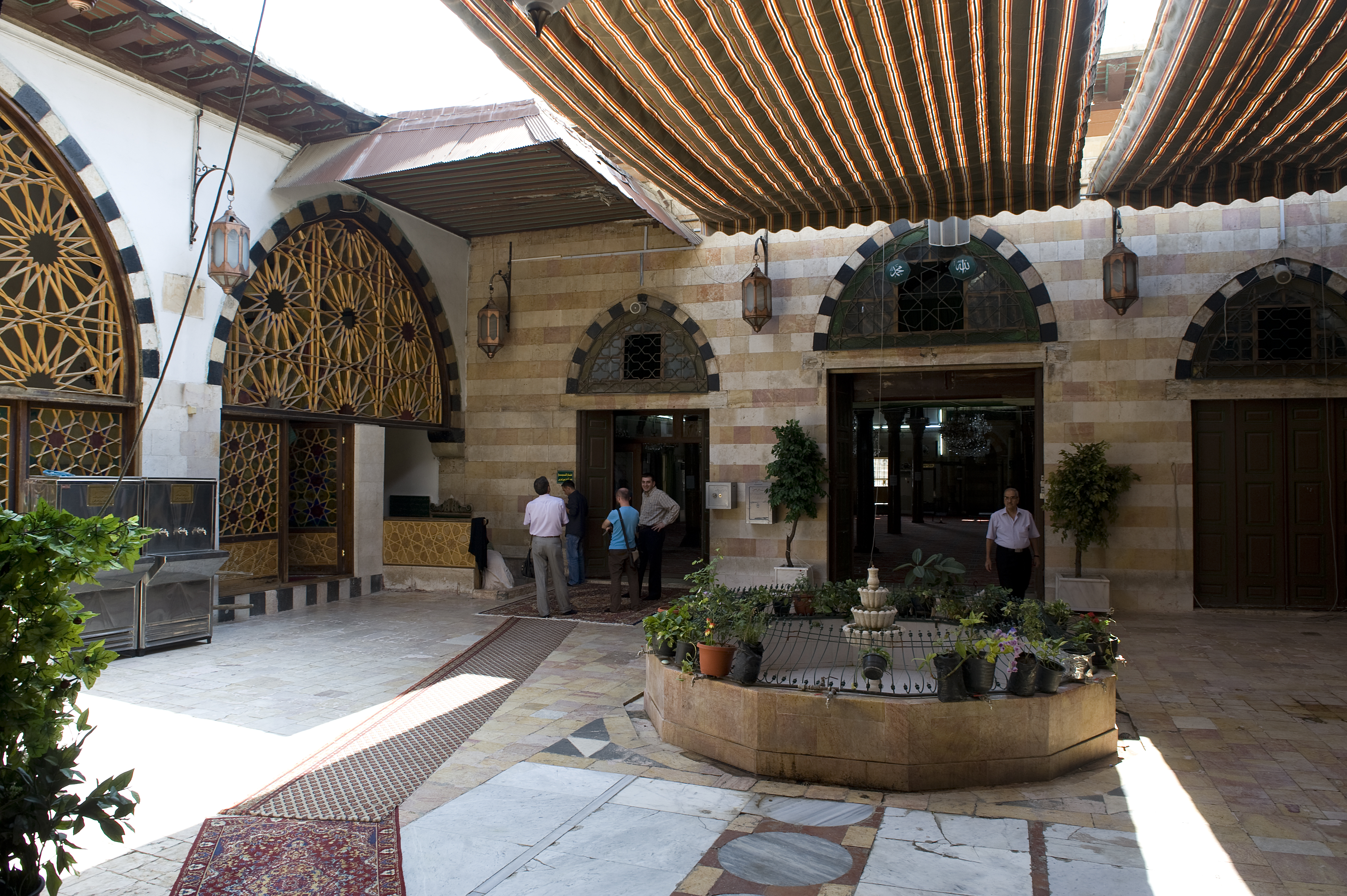
Courtyard

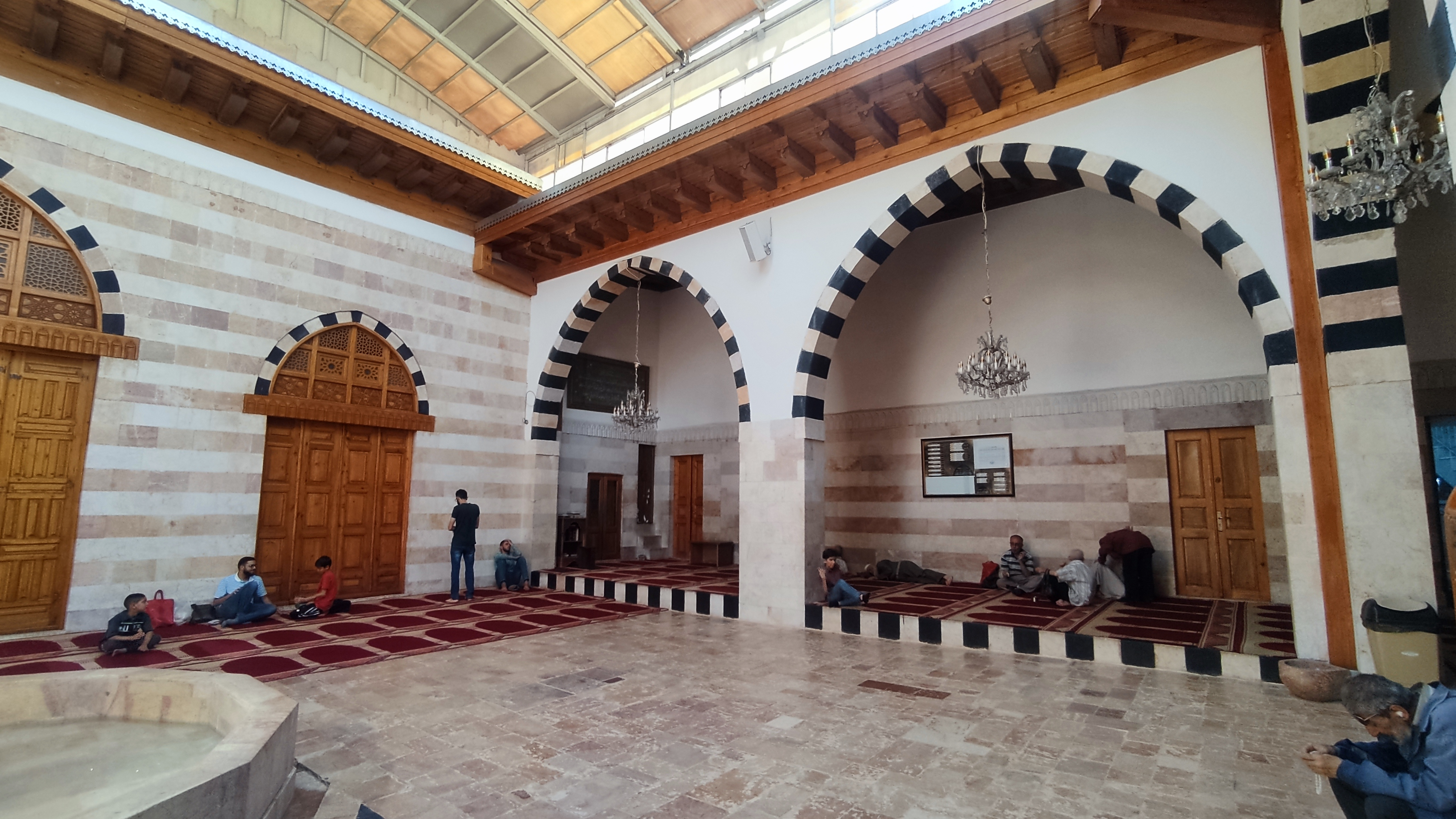
Courtyard

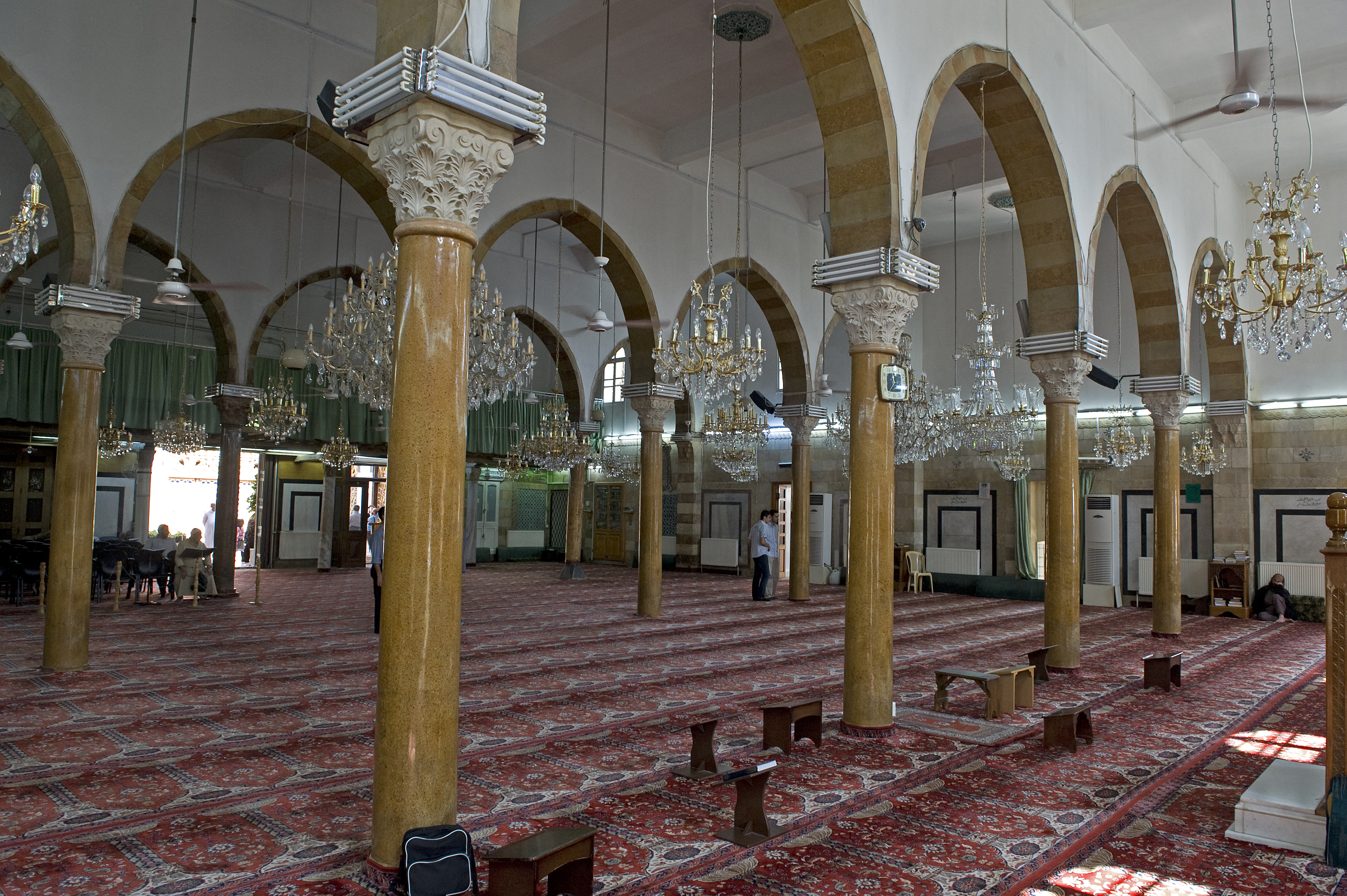
Interior

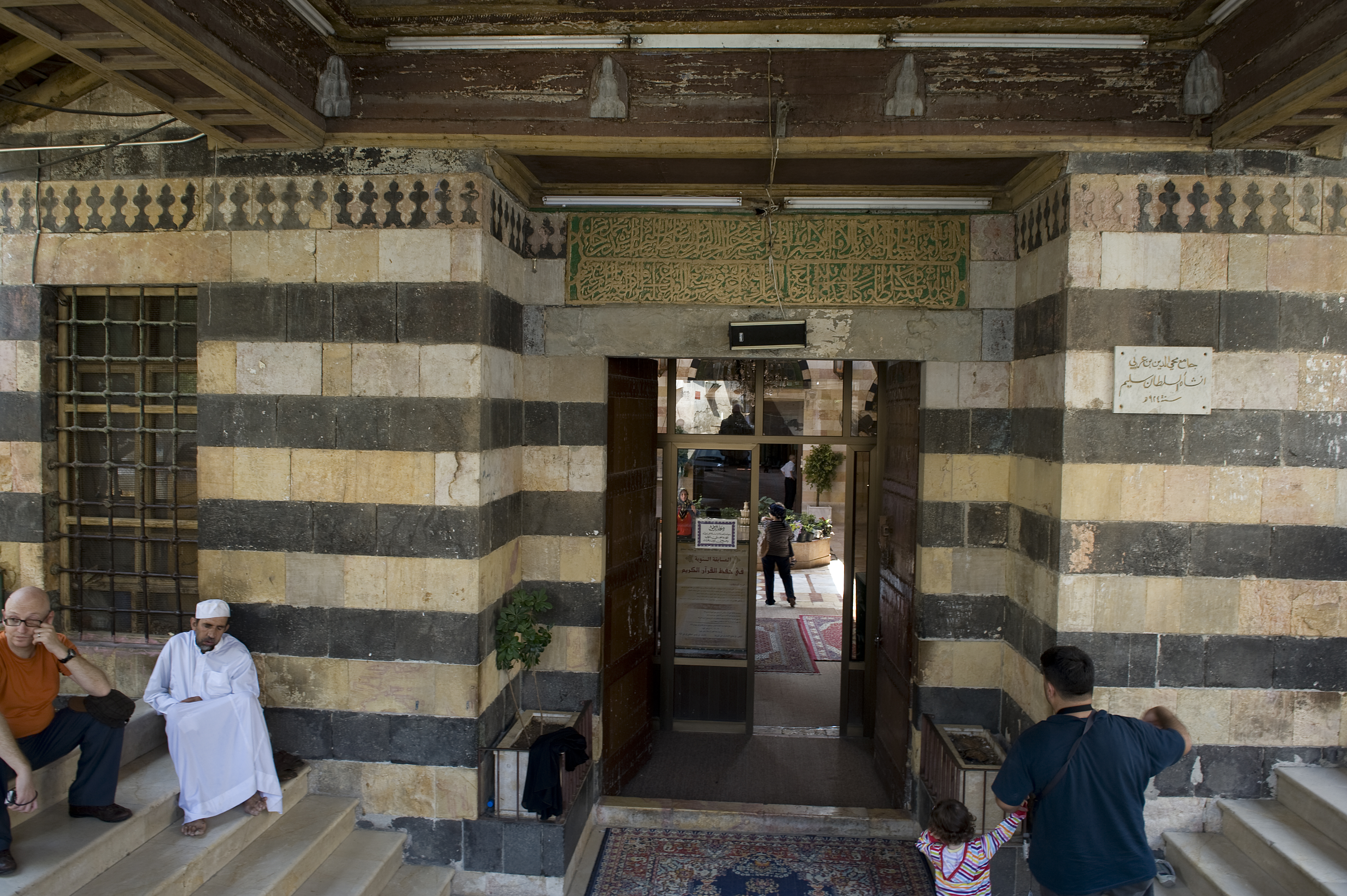
Entrance

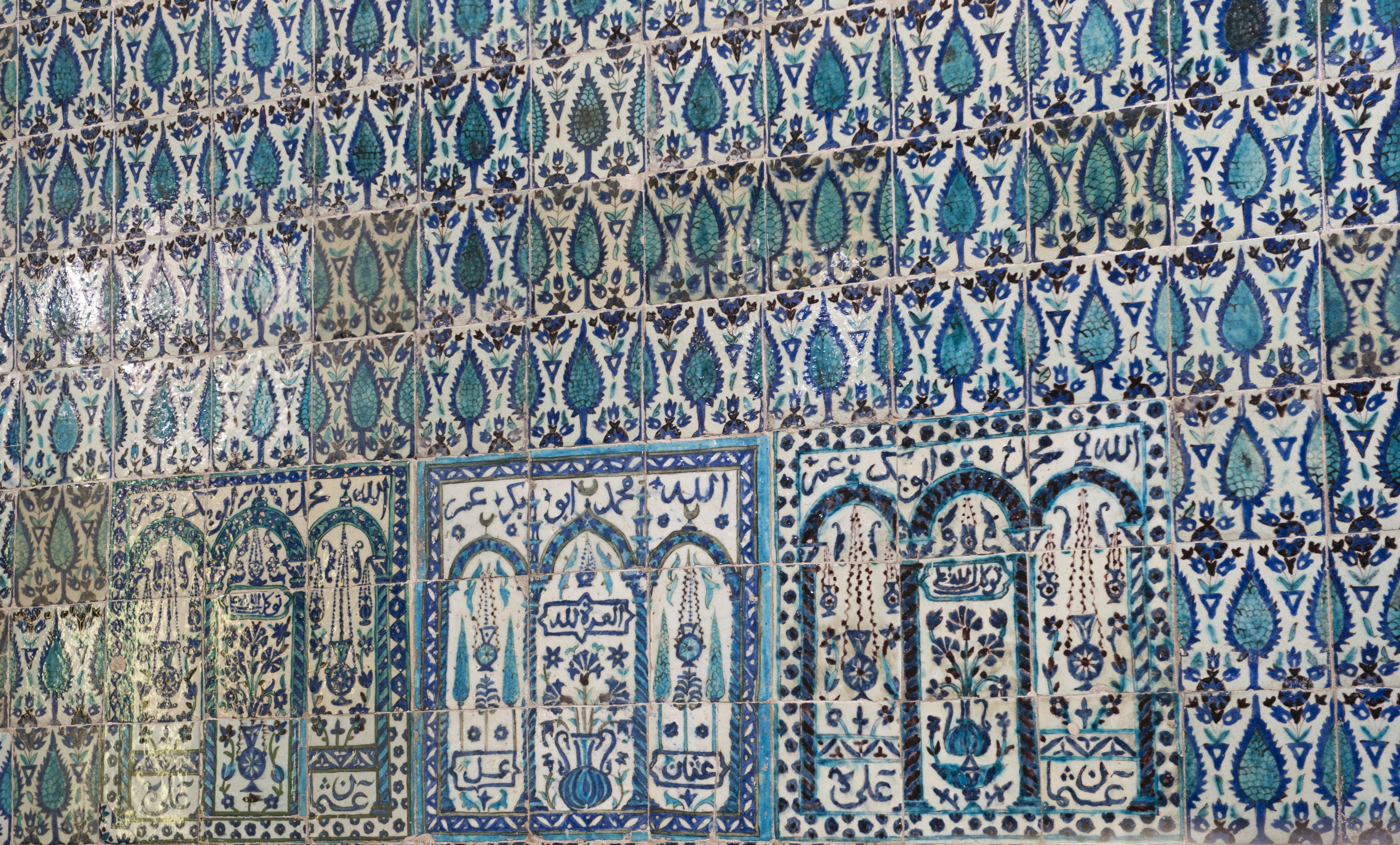
Iznik tiles in the mosque

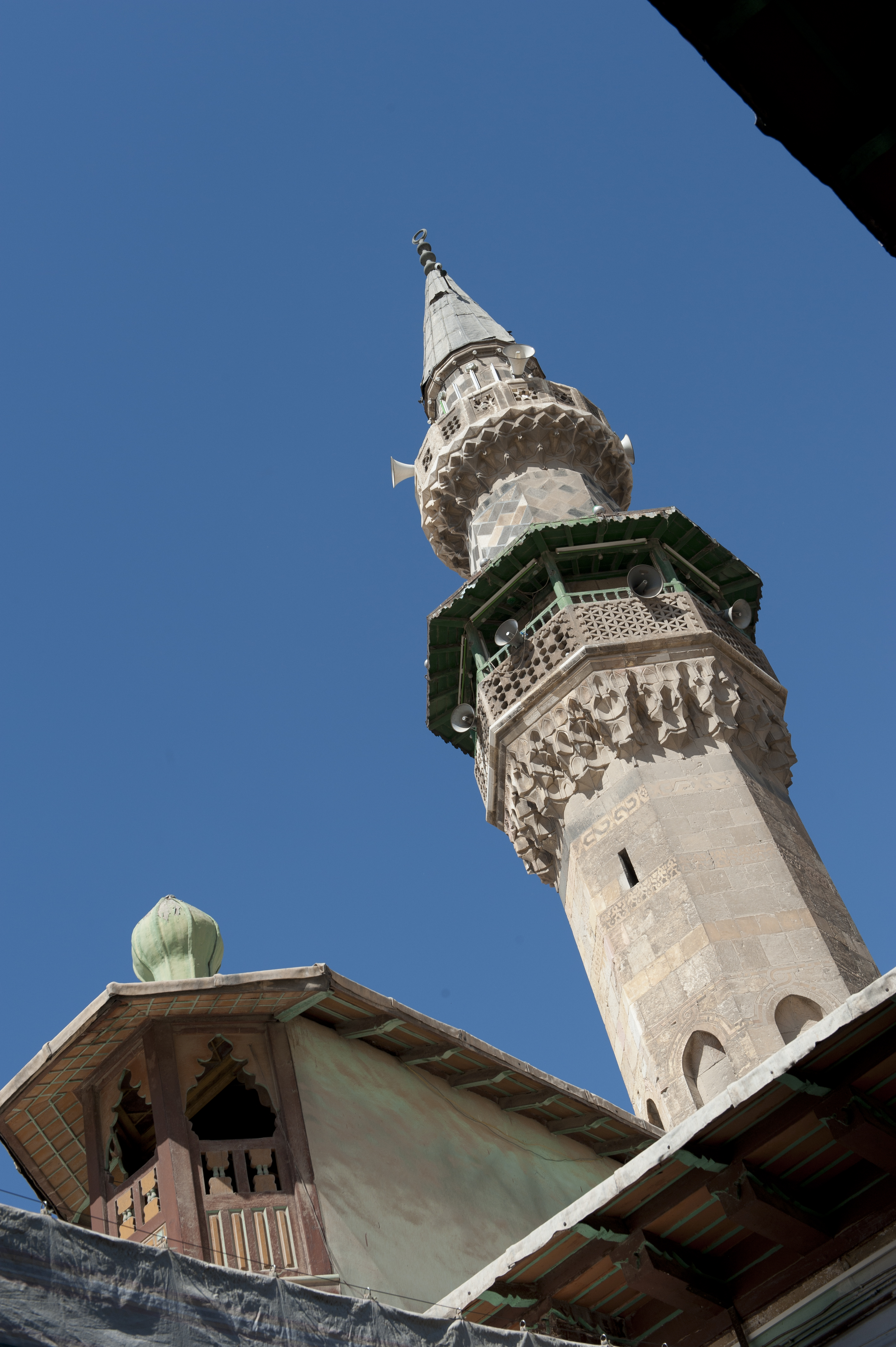
Minaret

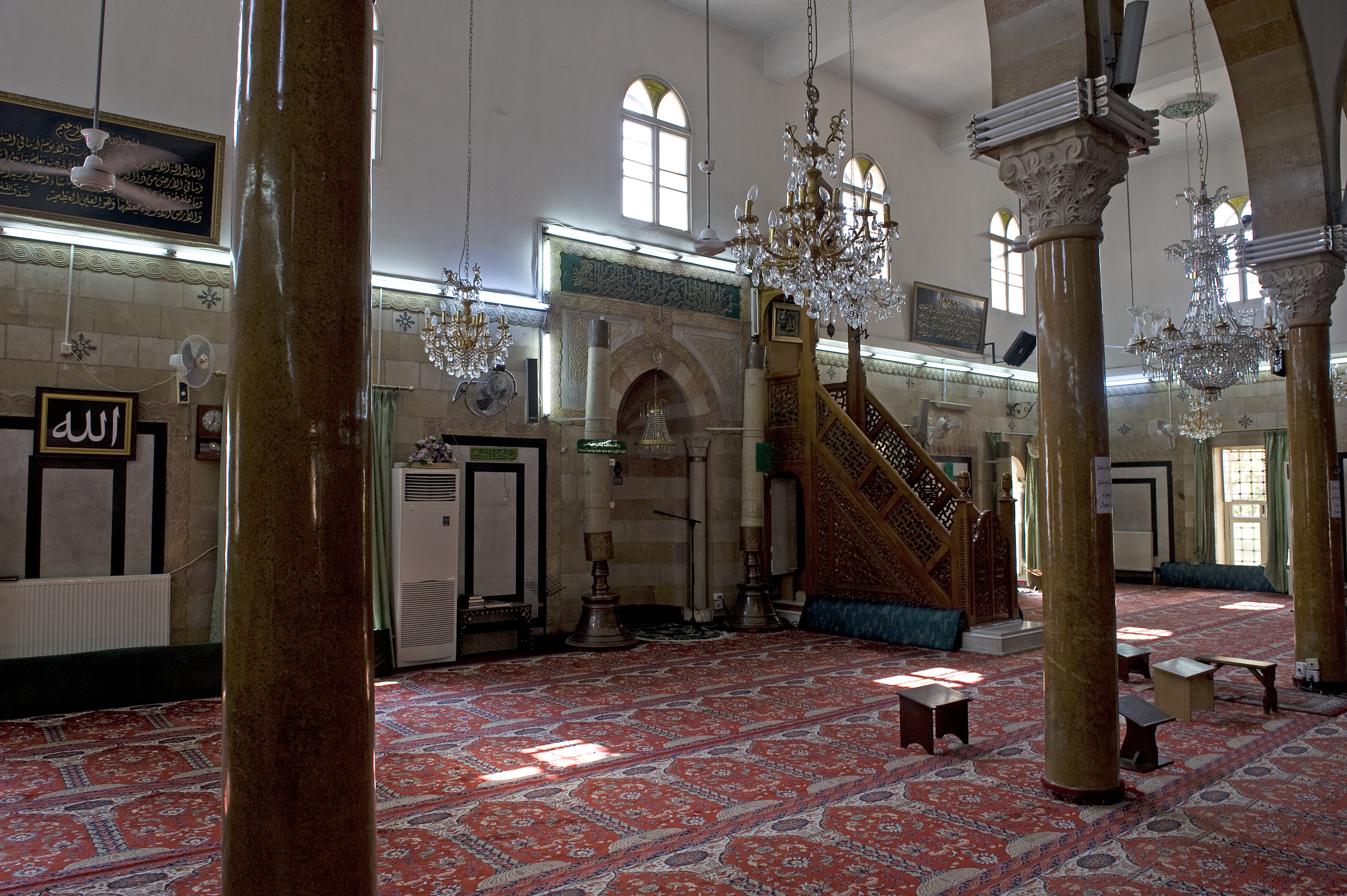
Mihrab and minbar

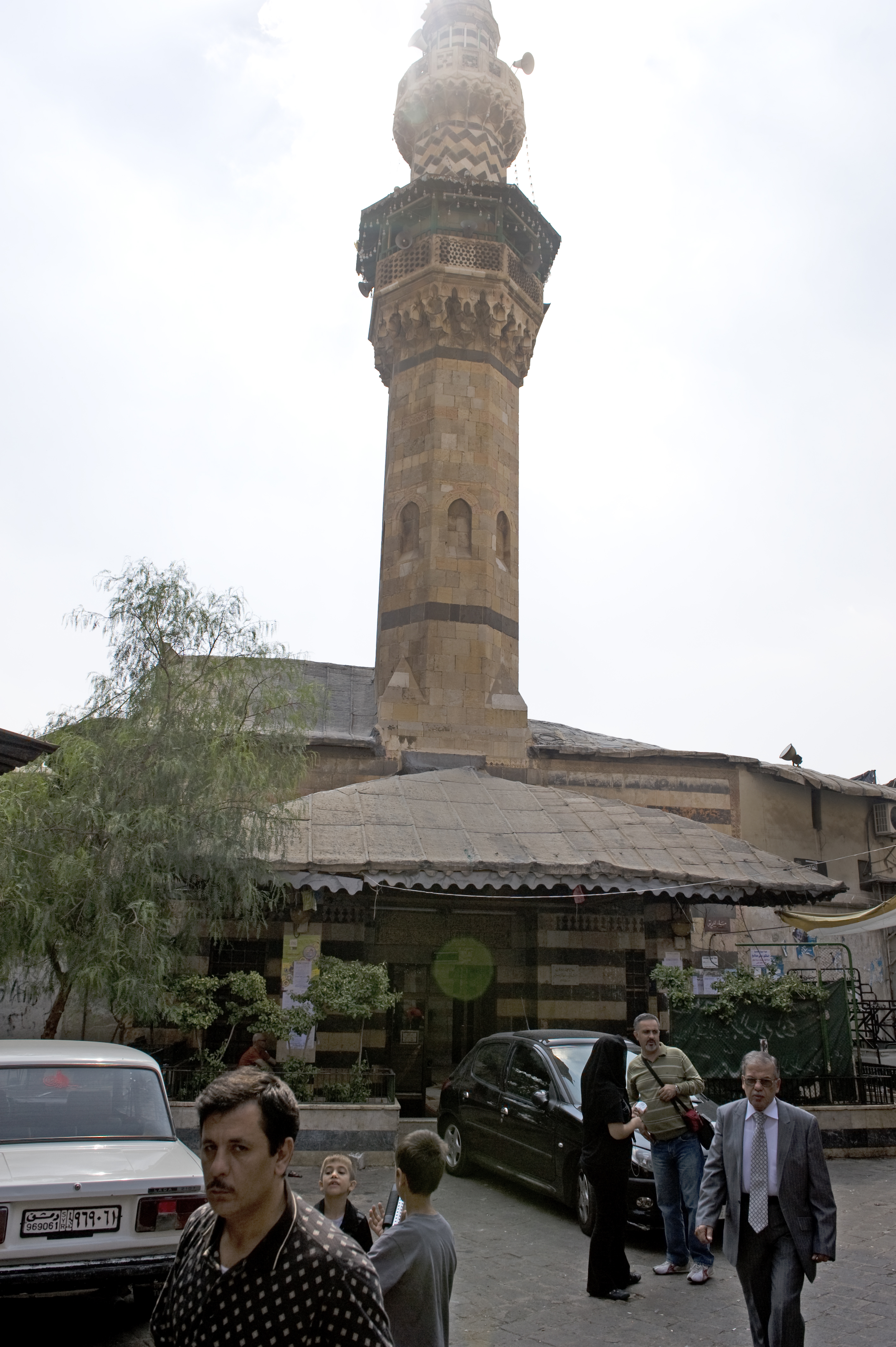
Exterior of the mosque

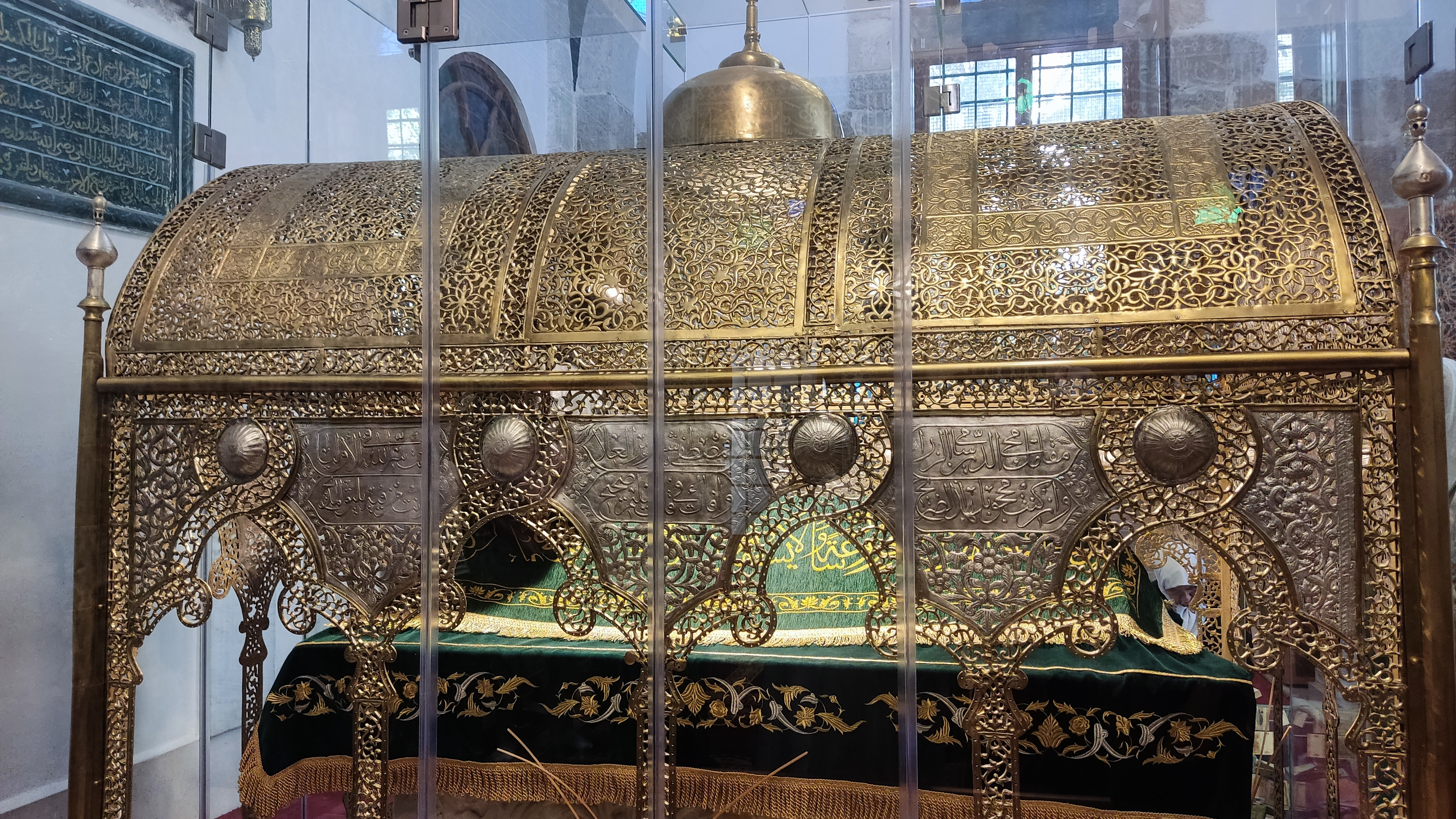
The tomb of Ibn Arabi

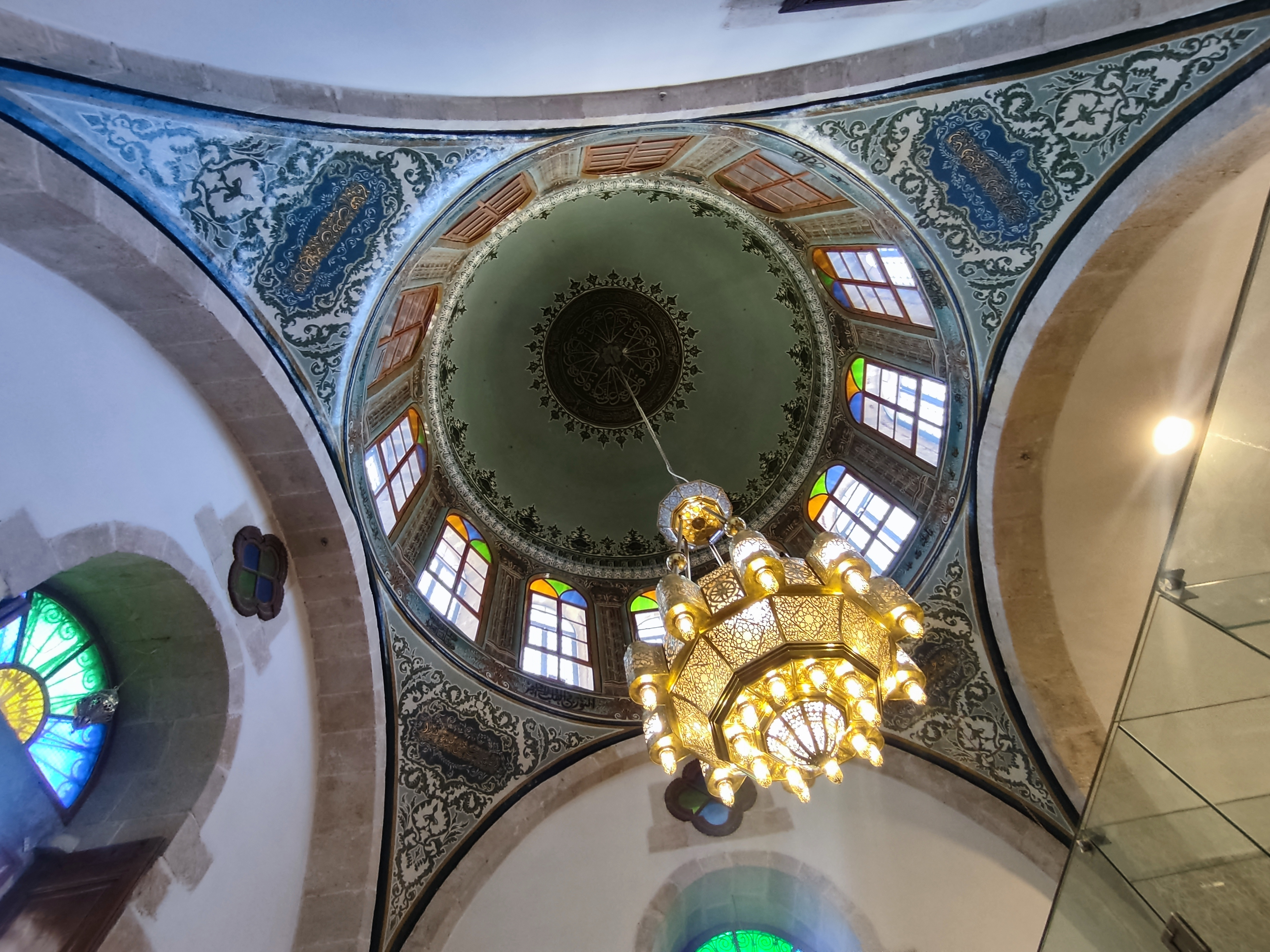
Dome of the mausoleum

== See also ==
- Islam in Syria
- List of mosques in Syria
