= Kabaağaç =

Kabaağaç can refer to:

- Kabaağaç, Havsa
- Kabaağaç, Kandıra
- Kabaağaç, Sarayköy
