= Kuzucu =

Kuzucu can refer to:

- Kuzucu, Havsa
- Kuzucu, Mezitli
