= Oğulpaşa =

Oğulpaşa can refer to:

- Oğulpaşa, Havsa
- Oğulpaşa, Osmaneli
