= Oğulpaşa, Havsa =

Village in Turkey

Oğulpaşa
- Village
- Location within Turkey Location within Marmara
- Country: Turkey
- Province: Edirne
- District: Havsa
- Population (2022): 788
- Time zone: UTC+3 (TRT)

Oğulpaşa is a village in the Havsa District of Edirne Province in Turkey. The village had a population of 788 in 2022.

== Geography ==
The village is located 17 km from the city centre of Edirne and 10 km from the Havsa district centre. It lies northwest of Havsa, near the D.100 highway connecting Edirne and Istanbul.
