= Kulubalık, Havsa =

Village in Turkey

Kulubalık
- Village
- Location within Turkey Location within Marmara
- Coordinates: 41°28′N 26°50′E
- Country: Turkey
- Province: Edirne
- District: Havsa
- Population (2022): 179
- Time zone: UTC+3 (TRT)

Kulubalık is a village in the Havsa District of Edirne Province in Turkey. The village had a population of 179 in 2022.
