= Köseömer, Havsa =

Village in Turkey

Köseömer
- Village
- Location within Turkey Location within Marmara
- Coordinates: 41°35′N 26°54′E
- Country: Turkey
- Province: Edirne
- District: Havsa
- Population (2022): 287
- Time zone: UTC+3 (TRT)

Köseömer is a village in the Havsa District of Edirne Province in Turkey. The village had a population of 287 in 2022.
