= Necatiye, Havsa =

Village in Turkey

Necatiye
- Village
- Location within Turkey Location within Marmara
- Coordinates: 41°30′12″N 26°54′00″E
- Country: Turkey
- Province: Edirne
- District: Havsa
- Population (2022): 532
- Time zone: UTC+3 (TRT)

Necatiye is a village in the Havsa District of Edirne Province in Turkey. The village had a population of 532 in 2022.
