= Çukurköy, Havsa =

Village in Turkey

Çukurköy
- Village
- Location within Turkey Location within Marmara
- Country: Turkey
- Province: Edirne
- District: Havsa
- Population (2022): 274
- Time zone: UTC+3 (TRT)

Çukurköy is a village in the Havsa District of Edirne Province in Turkey. The village had a population of 274 in 2022.
