= Taptık, Havsa =

Village in Turkey

Taptık
- Village
- Location within Turkey Location within Marmara
- Coordinates: 41°32′32″N 26°54′45″E
- Country: Turkey
- Province: Edirne
- District: Havsa
- Population (2022): 428
- Time zone: UTC+3 (TRT)

Taptık is a village in the Havsa District of Edirne Province in Turkey. The village had a population of 428 in 2022.
