= Söğütlüdere, Havsa =

Village in Turkey

Söğütlüdere
- Village
- Location within Turkey Location within Marmara
- Coordinates: 41.636°N 26.806°E
- Country: Turkey
- Province: Edirne
- District: Havsa
- Population (2022): 194
- Time zone: UTC+3 (TRT)

Söğütlüdere is a village in the Havsa District of Edirne Province in Turkey. The village had a population of 194 in 2022.
