= Osmanlı, Havsa =

Village in Turkey

Osmanlı
- Village
- Location within Turkey Location within Marmara
- Country: Turkey
- Province: Edirne
- District: Havsa
- Population (2022): 924
- Time zone: UTC+3 (TRT)

Osmanlı is a village in the Havsa District of Edirne Province in Turkey. The village had a population of 924 in 2022.
