= Tahal, Havsa =

Village in Turkey

Tahal
- Village
- Location within Turkey Location within Marmara
- Coordinates: 41°26′N 26°51′E
- Country: Turkey
- Province: Edirne
- District: Havsa
- Elevation: 50 m (160 ft)
- Population (2022): 195
- Time zone: UTC+3 (TRT)
- Postal code: 22530
- Area code: 0284

Tahal is a village and municipality in the Havsa District, Edirne Province, Turkey. The village had a population of 195 in 2022.
