= Naipyusuf, Havsa =

Village in Turkey

Naipyusuf
- Village
- Location within Turkey Location within Marmara
- Coordinates: 41°29′N 26°54′E
- Country: Turkey
- Province: Edirne
- District: Havsa
- Population (2022): 419
- Time zone: UTC+3 (TRT)

Naipyusuf is a village that is locate in the Havsa District of Edirne Province in Turkey. The village had a population of 419 in 2022.
