= Musulca, Havsa =

Village in Turkey

Musulca
- Village
- Location within Turkey Location within Marmara
- Coordinates: 41°40′N 26°52′E
- Country: Turkey
- Province: Edirne
- District: Havsa
- Population (2022): 265
- Time zone: UTC+3 (TRT)

Musulca is a village in the Havsa District of Edirne Province in Turkey. The village had a population of 265 in 2022.
