= Havsa District =

District of Edirne Province, Turkey

- District
- Map showing Havsa District in Edirne Province

- Location in Turkey Havsa District (Marmara)
- Coordinates: 41°33′N 26°49′E
- Country: Turkey
- Province: Edirne
- Seat: Havsa

Government
  - Kaymakam: İsmail Hakkı Batı
- Area: 545 km^{2} (210 sq mi)
- Population (2022): 17,969
  - Density: 33.0/km^{2} (85.4/sq mi)
- Time zone: UTC+3 (TRT)
- Website: www.havsa.gov.tr

Havsa District is a district of the Edirne Province of Turkey. Its seat is the town of Havsa. Its area is 545 km^{2}, and its population is 17,969 (2022). The district borders the Edirne District to the north and west, Süloğlu District to the north, the province of Kırklareli to the east and Uzunköprü District to the south.

== Composition ==
There is one municipality in Havsa District:

- Havsa

There are 22 villages in Havsa District:

- Abalar
- Arpaç
- Azatlı
- Bakışlar
- Bostanlı
- Çukurköy
- Habiller
- Hasköy
- Kabaağaç
- Köseömer
- Kulubalık
- Kuzucu
- Musulca
- Naipyusuf
- Necatiye
- Oğulpaşa
- Osmanlı
- Şerbettar
- Söğütlüdere
- Tahal
- Taptık
- Yolageldi
