= Azatlı, Havsa =

Village in Turkey

Azatlı
- Village
- Location within Turkey Location within Marmara
- Coordinates: 41.5005°N 26.7003°E
- Country: Turkey
- Province: Edirne
- District: Havsa
- Population (2022): 652
- Time zone: UTC+3 (TRT)

Azatlı is a village in the Havsa District of Edirne Province in Turkey. The village had a population of 652 in 2022.
