= List of burial places of presidents of Turkey =

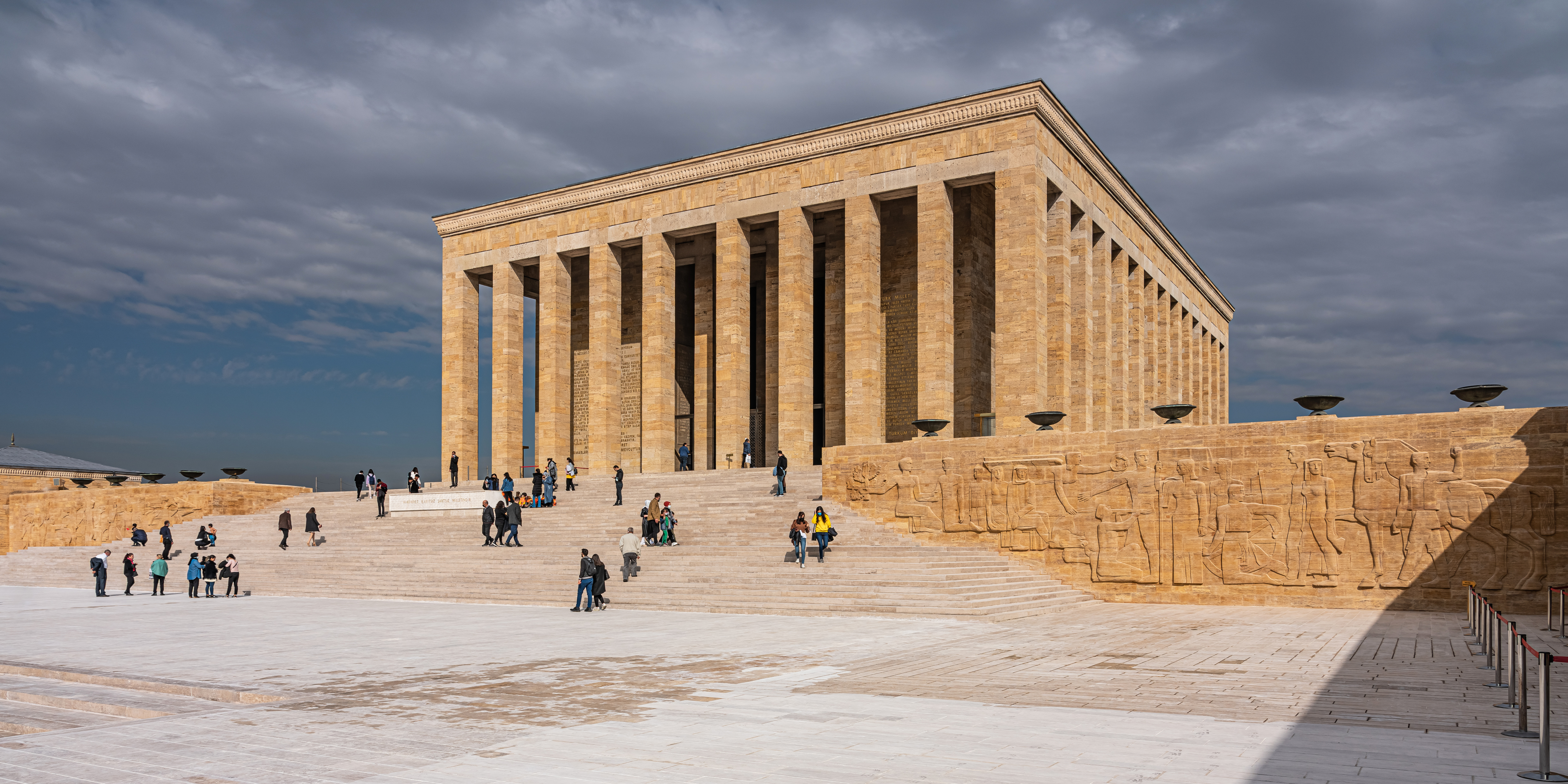
Anıtkabir is the mausoleum of Mustafa Kemal Atatürk, the founder of modern Turkey

The following is a list of burial places of the Presidents of Turkey.

== Presidential burial places ==
OP	President	Date of death	Place of death	Burial place	City	Site image
1	Mustafa Kemal Atatürk	November 10, 1938	Istanbul Dolmabahçe Palace	Anıtkabir	Ankara	
2	İsmet İnönü	December 25, 1973	Ankara Pink Mansion	Anıtkabir	Ankara	
3	Celâl Bayar	August 22, 1986	Ankara Gülhane Military Medical Academy Hospital	Mausoleum of Celâl Bayar	Bursa	
4	Cemal Gürsel	September 14, 1966	Ankara Haydarpaşa Hospital	Turkish State Cemetery	Ankara	
5	Cevdet Sunay	May 22, 1982	Istanbul Admiral Bristol Hospital	Turkish State Cemetery	Ankara	
6	Fahri Korutürk	October 12, 1987	Istanbul. Korutürk's house in Moda, Kadıköy	Turkish State Cemetery	Ankara	
7	Kenan Evren	May 9, 2015	Ankara Gülhane Training and Research Hospital	Turkish State Cemetery	Ankara	
8	Turgut Özal	April 17, 1993	Ankara Hacettepe University Hospital	Mausoleum of Turgut Özal	Istanbul	
9	Süleyman Demirel	June 17, 2015	Ankara Güven Hospital	Mausoleum of Süleyman Demirel	Isparta	
10	Ahmet Necdet Sezer	Alive		Unknown		
11	Abdullah Gül	Alive		Kayseri City Cemetery	Kayseri	
12	Recep Tayyip Erdoğan	Alive		Karacaahmet Cemetery	Istanbul	

== See also ==
- List of burial places of Ottoman sultans
- List of burial places of presidents and vice presidents of the United States
- List of burial places of prime ministers of the United Kingdom
- Death and state funeral of Mustafa Kemal Atatürk
