= Bakışlar, Havsa =

Village in Turkey

Bakışlar
- Village
- Location within Turkey Location within Marmara
- Coordinates: 41.4578°N 26.8313°E
- Country: Turkey
- Province: Edirne
- District: Havsa
- Population (2022): 184
- Time zone: UTC+3 (TRT)

Bakışlar is a village in the Havsa District of Edirne Province in Turkey. The village had a population of 184 in 2022.
