= Nike (Thrace) =

Coordinates: 41°32′58″N 26°49′24″E

Nike or Nice (Ancient Greek: Νίκη), or Nicaea or Nikaia (Νίκαια), or Nicae, was a town of Thrace, not far from Adrianople, the scene of the defeat and death of the emperor Valens by the Goths in 378.

The site is located near Havsa in modern Turkey.
