= Bostanlı Open-air Archaeological Museum =

Museum in Turkey

Coordinates: 38°27′19″N 27°05′56″E

Bostanlı Open-air Archaeological Museum (Turkish: Bostanlı Açıkhava Müzesi) is an open-air archaeological museum in Karşıyaka district of İzmir, Turkey.
