= Kabaağaç, Havsa =

Village in Turkey

Kabaağaç
- Village
- Location within Turkey Location within Marmara
- Coordinates: 41.479722°N 26.8675°E
- Country: Turkey
- Province: Edirne
- District: Havsa
- Population (2022): 172
- Time zone: UTC+3 (TRT)

Kabaağaç is a village in the Havsa District of Edirne Province in Turkey. The village had a population of 172 in 2022.
