= Tomb of Mahmud II =

Monument in Istanbul, Turkey

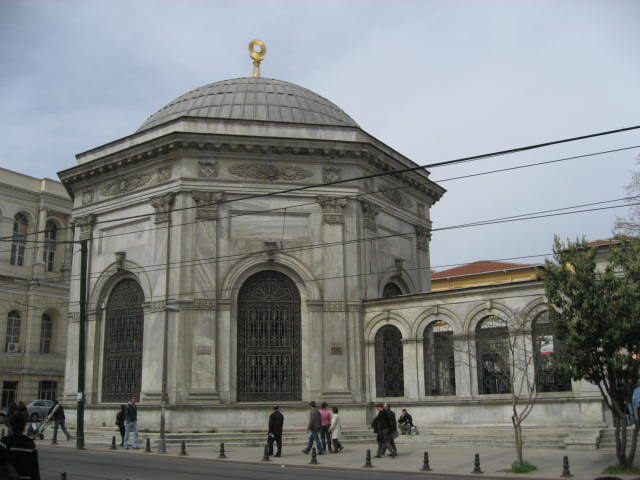
- Exterior, 2008
- Location: Turkey
- Type: Tomb

The Tomb of Mahmud II is a tomb built by the Ottoman Sultan Abdulmecid for his father Mahmud II in Istanbul, where other sultans and members of the Ottoman Dynasty were later buried. Completed in 1840, the tomb is located on Divanyolu Street in the Çemberlitaş neighborhood of the Fatih district of Istanbul.

== Description and history ==
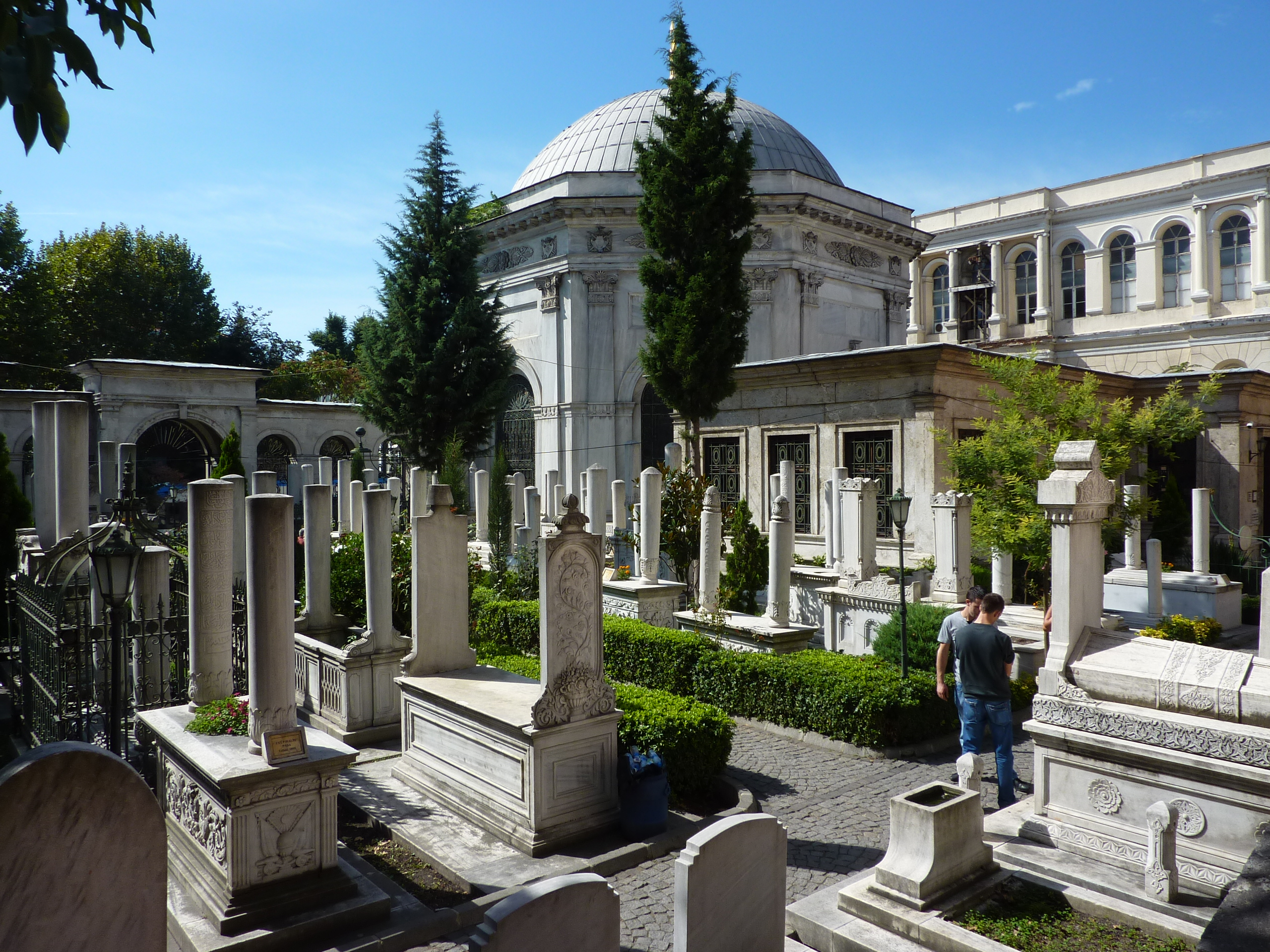
Graveyard

After Mahmud II died in 1839, his son Abdulmecid, who succeeded him, immediately asked the architect brothers Ohannes Dadyan and Boğos Dadyan to build a tomb for his father. The land used for the construction of the tomb was allocated by Mahmud II's beloved sister Esma Sultan. Esma Sultan had her own mansion on this land at the time. According to Can Selman, the tomb is the work of Engineer Abdulhalim Efendi, who served as the Ebniye Director for two terms. Pars Tuğlacı, on the other hand, claims that the work belongs to Garabed Balyan. However, he did not provide any sources to support this claim. There are also studies showing Ohannes and Bogos Dadyan as architects without any definitive evidence. The structure, which was built on the Divanyolu, on the area where the palace of Sultan Mahmud II's sister Esma Sultan was previously located, consists of a tomb, fountain, a burial ground and guard rooms. The tomb also contains the graves of Sultan Abdülaziz and Sultan Abdülhamid II. Engineer Abdülhalim Efendi built the Mekteb-i Maarif-i Adliye and a library next to the tomb. In fact, a building was built during the reign of Mahmud II as the Mekteb-i Maarif-i Adliye. However, due to the burning of the Babıâli, it was decided that the building, which was built as the Maarif-i Adliye, would be used until the construction of the new Babıâli was completed. After the death of Sultan Mahmud II, it was deemed appropriate to build this school, which was his own work, instead of the madrasah that was planned to be built next to his tomb. After the construction of the New Sublime Porte, it was decided to turn the old one into a guest house.

The tomb in the Empire style is covered with white marble. The tomb, which is reached by steps, is octagonal. Its dome is decorated with embossed wreaths and flowers. There is a marble inscription written by the calligrapher Mehmet Haşim inside the structure. The crystal chandelier hanging from the dome inside the tomb was sent by Queen Victoria I of the United Kingdom. The gilded wall clocks on both sides of the door were also gifts from Emperor Napoleon III of France.

The courtyard next to the tomb was converted into a hazire (cemetery attached to the tomb) in 1861, and the majority of statesmen, writers and poets who served between 1840-1920 were buried in this courtyard. Here are the tombstones and sarcophagi that reflect the most beautiful examples of Ottoman stonework art.
