= Sulaymaniyya Takiyya =

Takiyya in Damascus, Syria

- التَّكِيَّة السُّلَيْمَانِيَّة
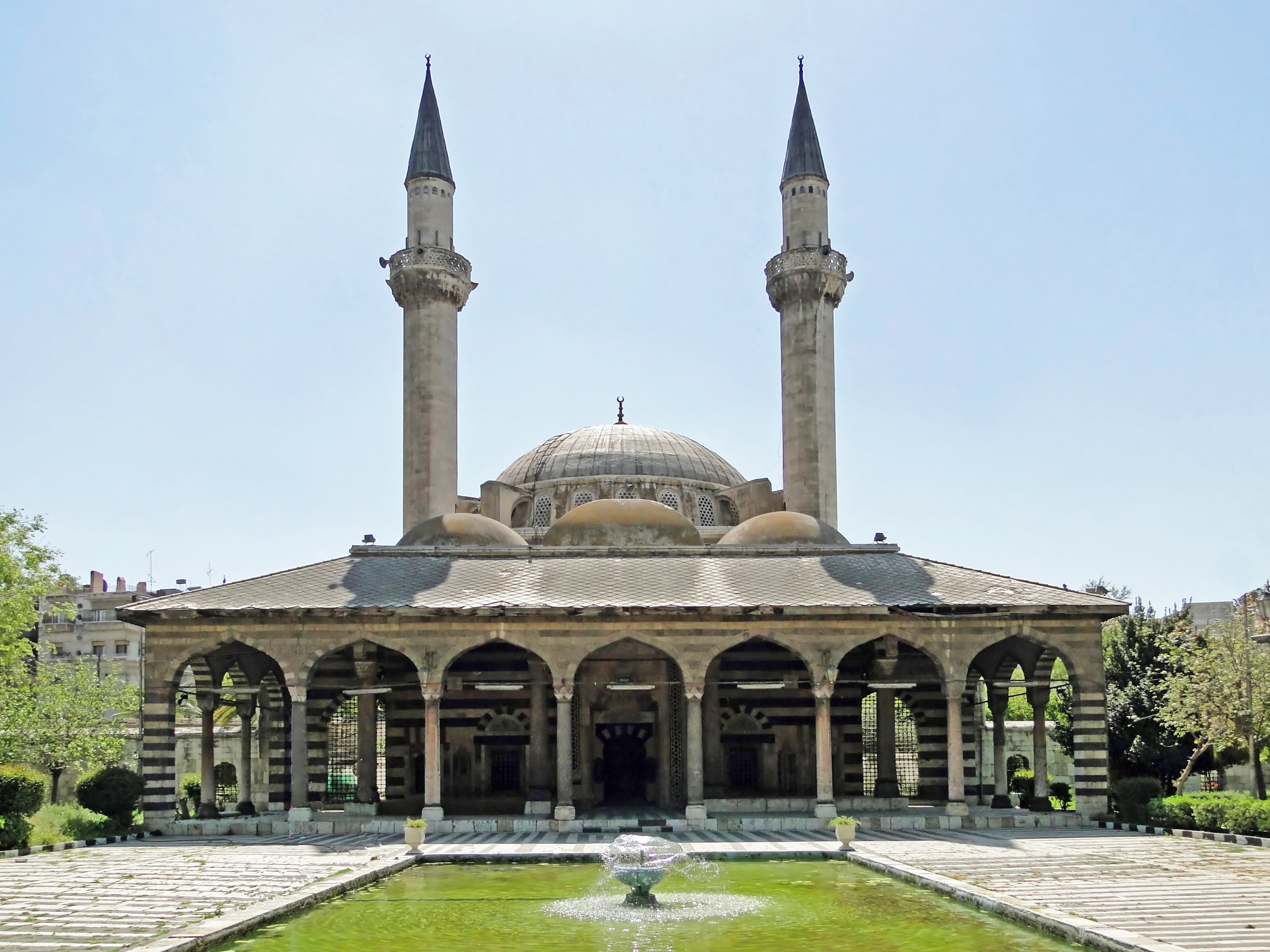
- The mosque

- Location of the mosque in Damascus

Religion
- Affiliation: Sunni Islam
- Ecclesiastical or organisational status: Takiyya / Mosque
- Status: Active

Location
- Location: Damascus
- Country: Syria
- Interactive map of Sulaymaniyya Takiyya
- Coordinates: 33°30′45″N 36°17′29″E

Architecture
- Architect: Mimar Sinan
- Type: Takiyya
- Style: Ottoman
- Completed: 1559 (mosque); 1567 (Salimiyya Madrasa)

Specifications
- Dome: 1 (maybe more)
- Minaret: 2
- Materials: Stone, marble, mosaic

The Sulaymaniyya Takiyya (Arabic: التَّكِيَّة السُّلَيْمَانِيَّة, romanized: at-Takiyya as-Sulaymāniyya) is a takiyya (an institution established to serve pilgrims and the poor, providing communal meals through a soup kitchen as well as residential accommodation). It is located in Damascus, Syria, on the right bank of the Barada River. Commissioned by the Ottoman sultan Suleiman the Magnificent, the western building of the complex was built, following the plans of Mimar Sinan, between 1554 and 1559. Another building was added eastwards from it in 1566 to be used as a madrasa (which became known as the Salimiyya Madrasa, named after Suleiman's son Selim II, although this building too may have been commissioned by Suleiman before his death). It was built on the site of the former Ablaq Palace, which was constructed by Sultan Baybars.

Although not the first Ottoman building in Damascus (that is considered to have been the Salimiyya Takiyya in as-Salihiyya), the Sulaymaniyya Takiyya is considered to have marked the introduction of the Ottoman architectural style to Damascus. In the centuries following its construction, the Sulaymaniyya Takiyya became an important stop on the "Syrian route" of pilgrims to Mecca, and it is considered to this day "as the most important Ottoman cultural building" in Damascus.

In the cemetery of the complex, the last Ottoman sultan is buried, Mehmed VI, who was forced into exile upon the abolition of the Ottoman sultanate in 1922.

== Construction ==
Sultan Suleiman I who had recently lost two sons, as he executed his son Şehzade Mustafa, followed by Şehzade Cihangir who died of grief, wanted to establish a mosque for the salvation of his soul, so he chose the site of his father Selim I's former palace in Damascus.

=== Western building ===
The construction of the western building was commissioned in 1554–55 during the reign of governor Şemsi Pasha, until it was completed in 1558–59. This building was masterminded by Mimar Sinan and built by local craftsmen, on the location of Baibars' Ablaq Palace which was destroyed by Tamerlane forces during the siege of Damascus. It is composed of a large mosque on the southwest side of a courtyard, flanked by a single line of stone arcading, and a soup kitchen (known in Turkish as imaret) across the courtyard to the northwest, flanked by hospice buildings.

==== Mosque ====
The mosque has two minarets and Ottoman-style domes. It also has walls with alternating light and dark stripes, an architectural feature known as ablaq and of Syrian origin. The mosque has been described as "the finest example of Ottoman architecture in Damascus".

=== Eastern building ===
In addition to the first building and eastwards from it, a madrasa was built in 1566–67. It was possibly ordered by Süleyman right before his death in 1566 as it was called the Sulaymaniyya Madrasa in some sources upon completion, but over time it became known as the Salimiyya Madrasa (after Süleyman's son Selim II), and was subject to the Hanafi school.

== Usage history ==
The complex later served as a gathering point for pilgrims who wanted to prepare for the annual Hajj.

== Cemetery ==
The cemetery next to the mosque is the burial place of the last Ottoman Sultan Mehmed VI, who was dethroned and forced into exile when the Ottoman sultanate was abolished in 1922. He died on May 16, 1926, in Sanremo, Italy and was buried at the cemetery of the Sulaymaniyya Takiyya. The mosque was chosen because it was located in the closest Muslim-majority country to Turkey and was built by his ancestors. There are almost thirty other graves of the Ottoman dynasty who died in exile and were not allowed to be buried in the Republic of Turkey at the time.

== Gallery ==
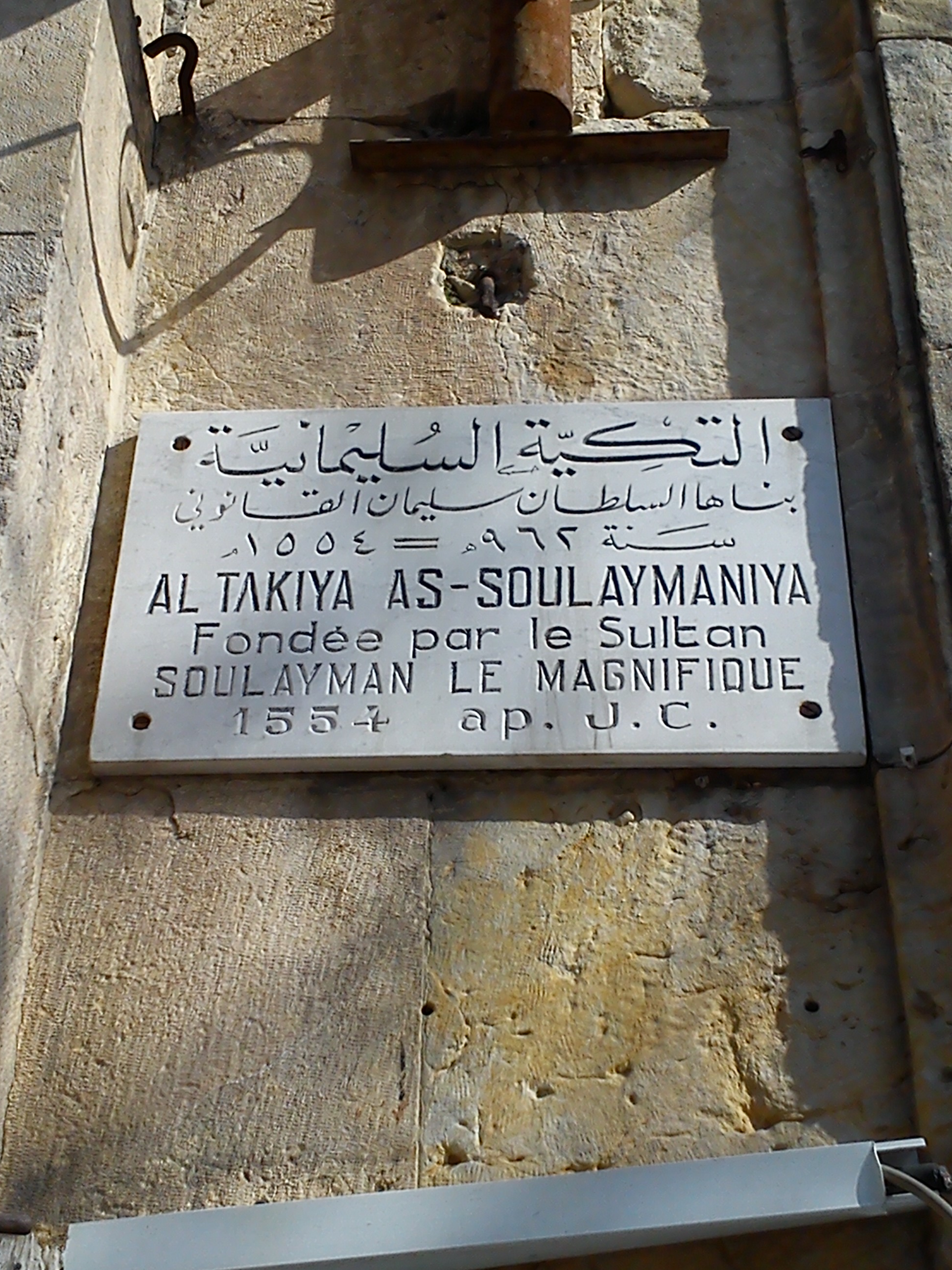
Plaque

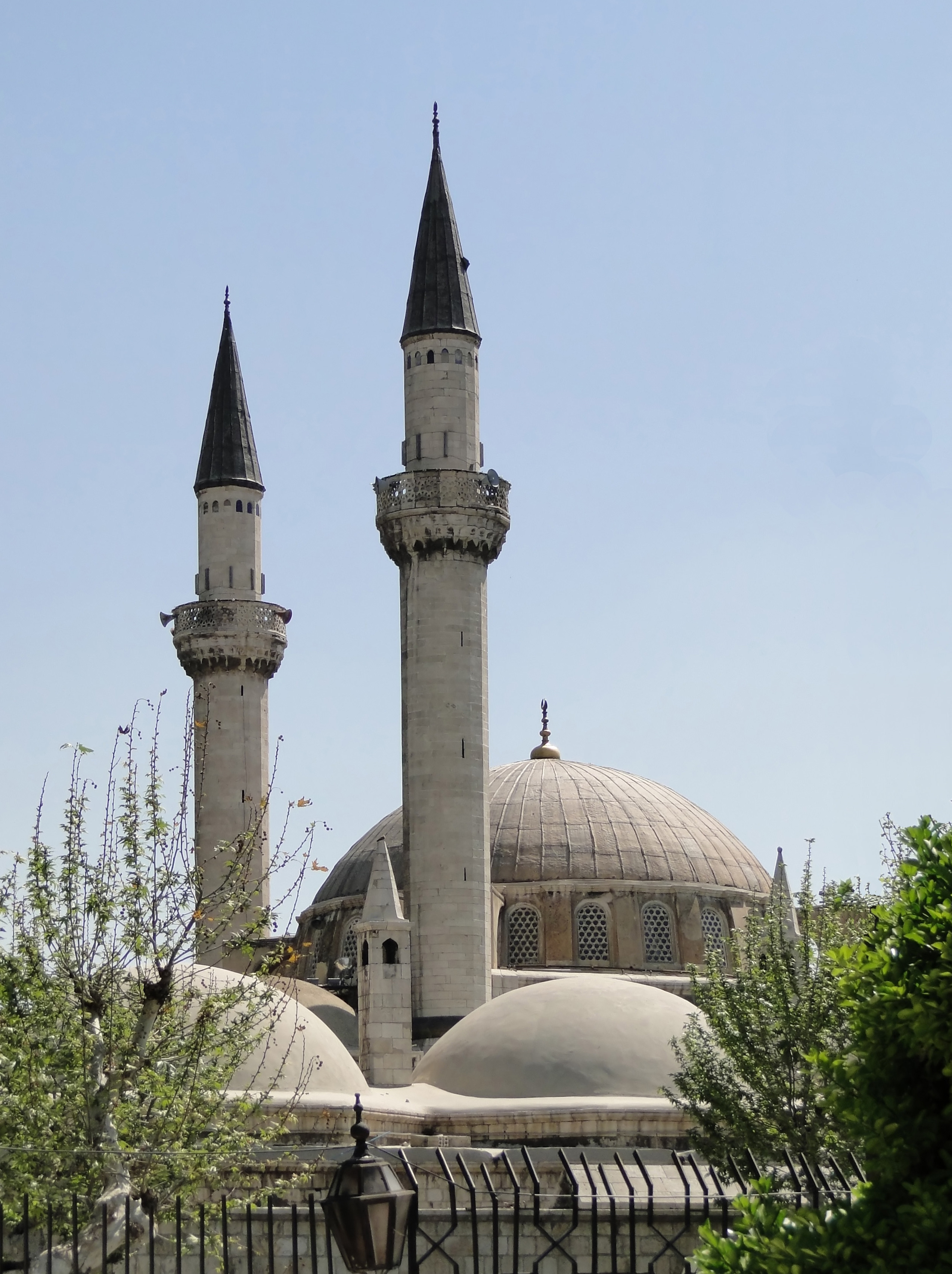
The minarets of the mosque seen from outside the fence

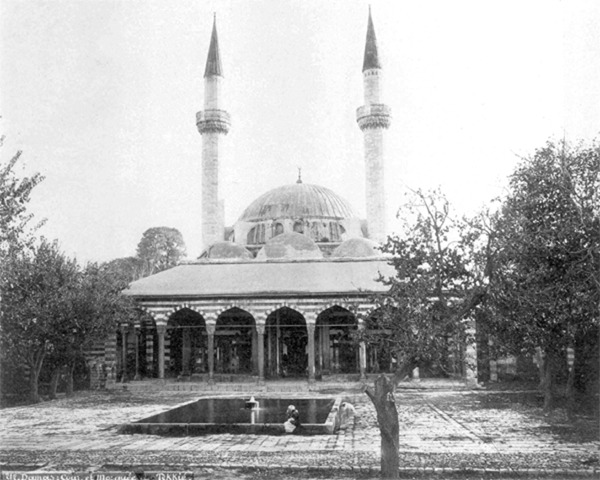
The mosque courtyard in 1870

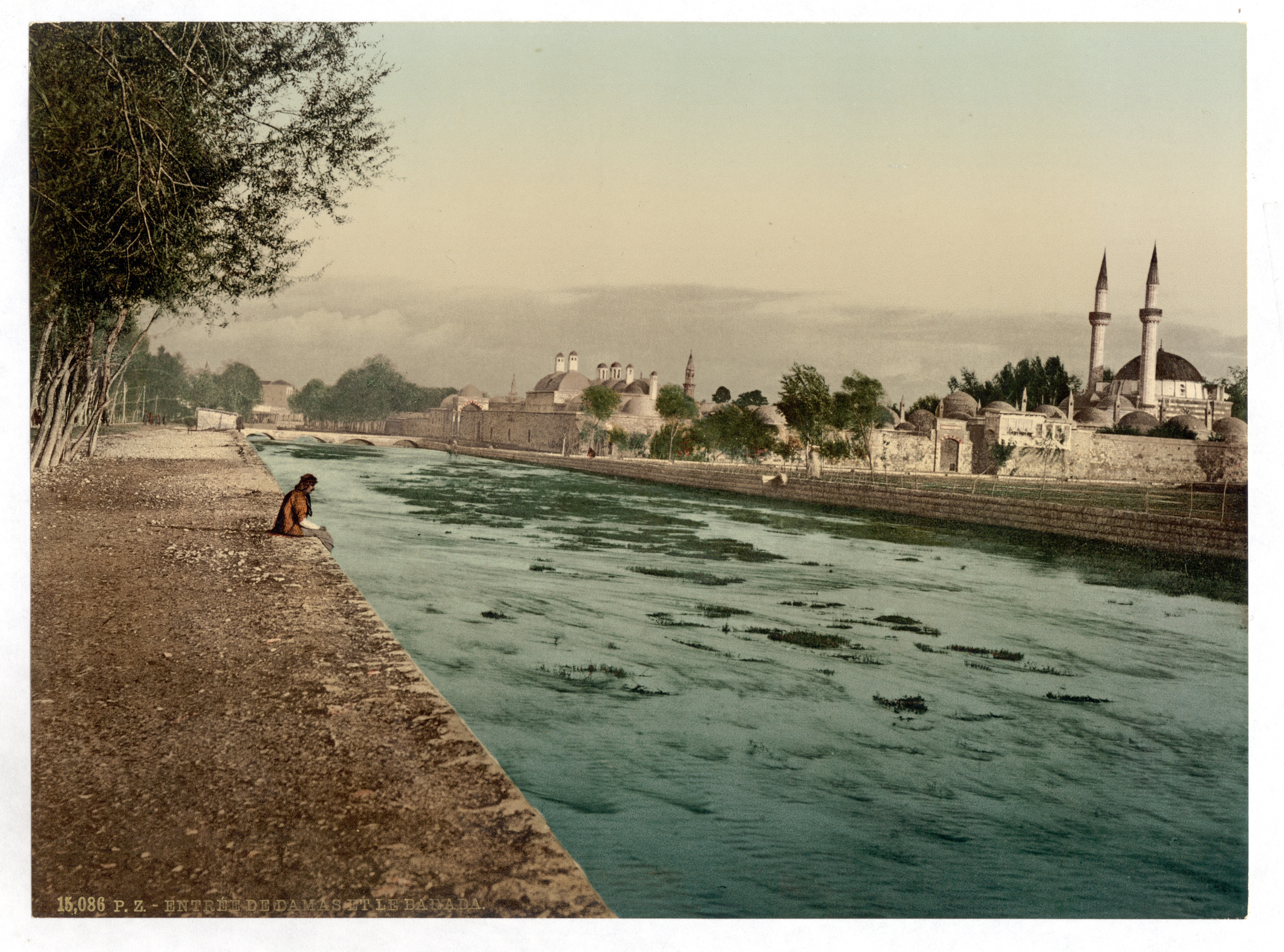
View of the Mosque from the Barada River, c. 1890–1900

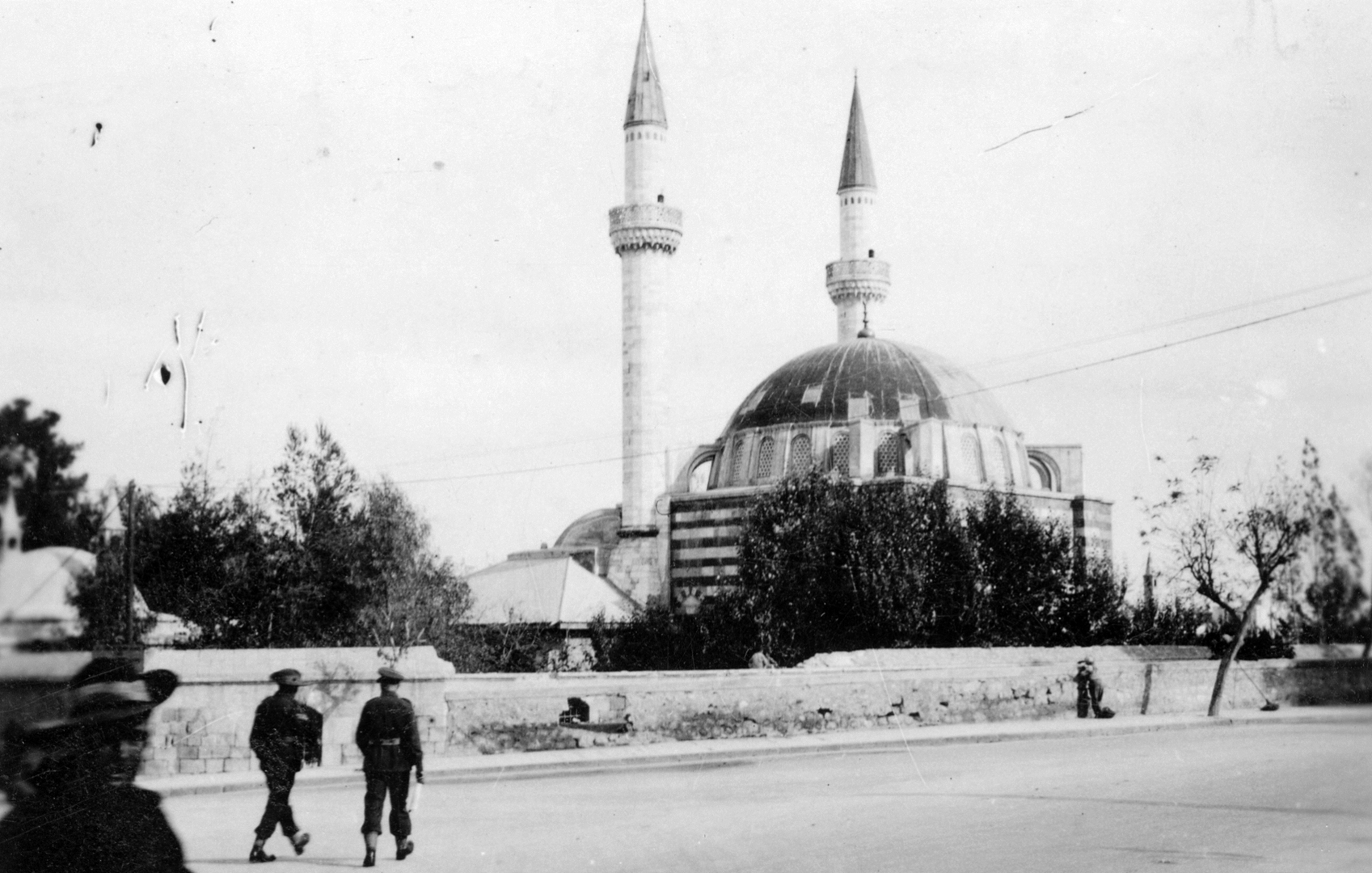
Mosque in 1942

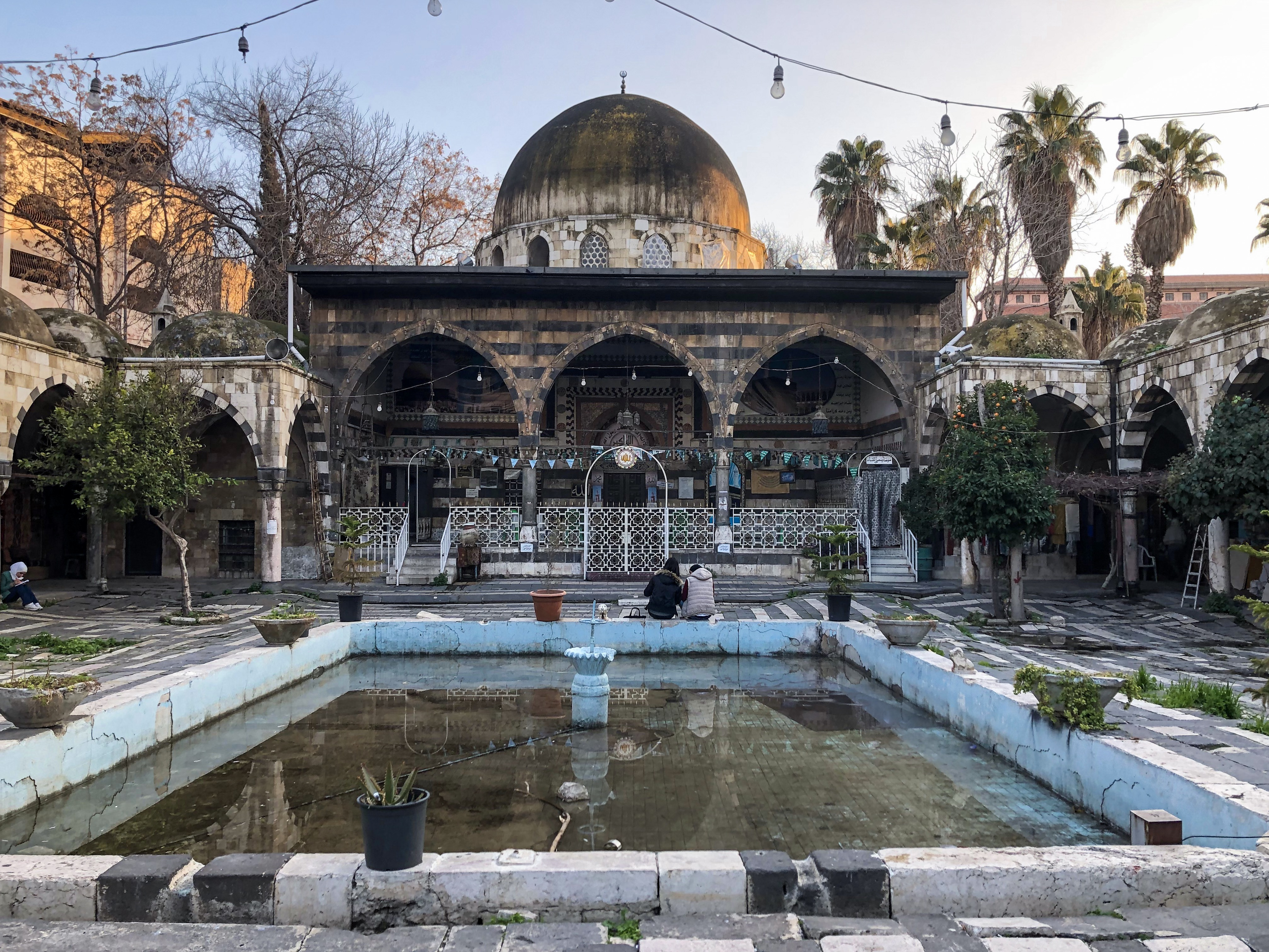
Salimiyya Madrasa courtyard

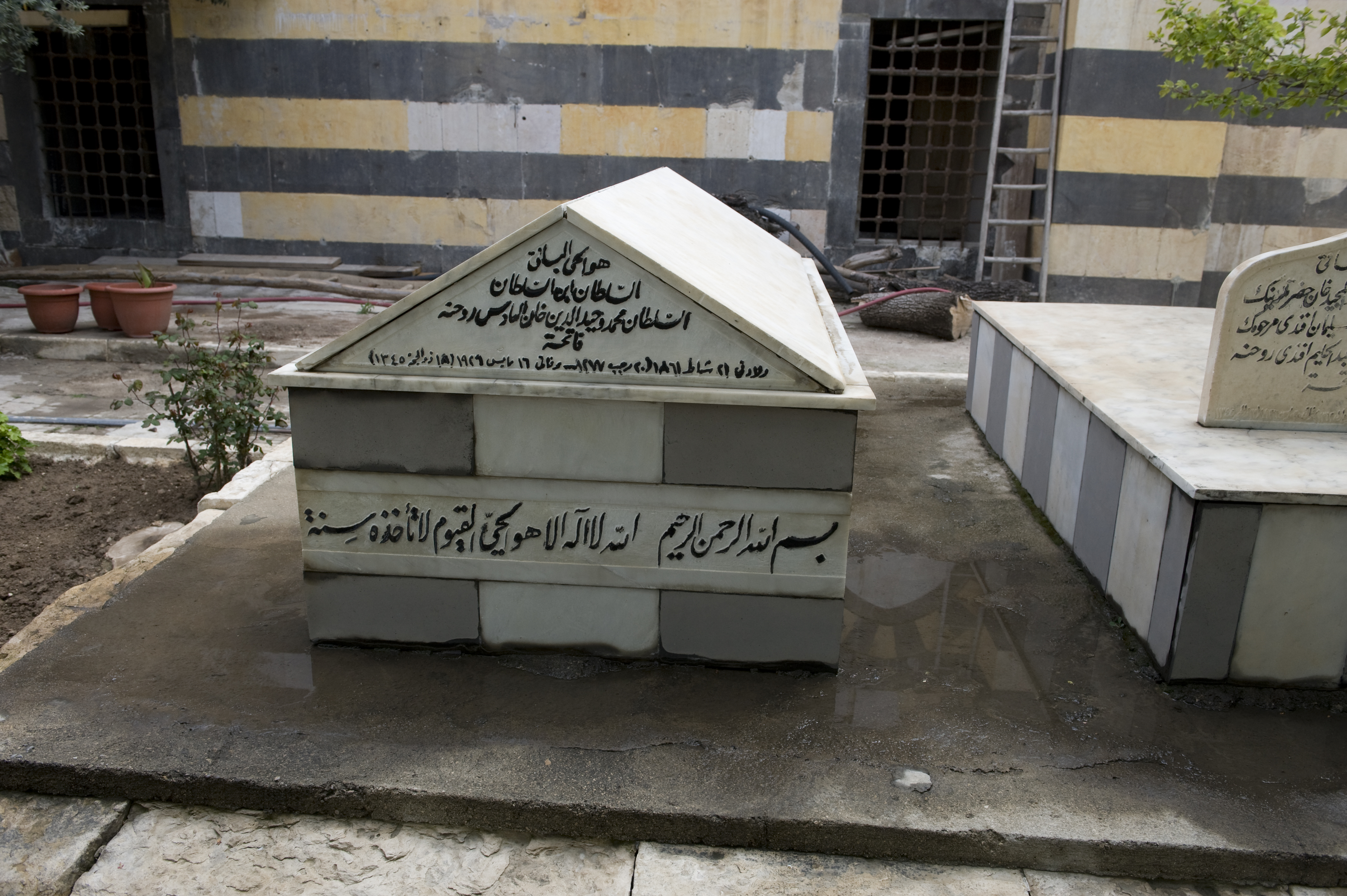
Grave of the last Ottoman sultan, Mehmed VI (r. 1918–1922), in the cemetery

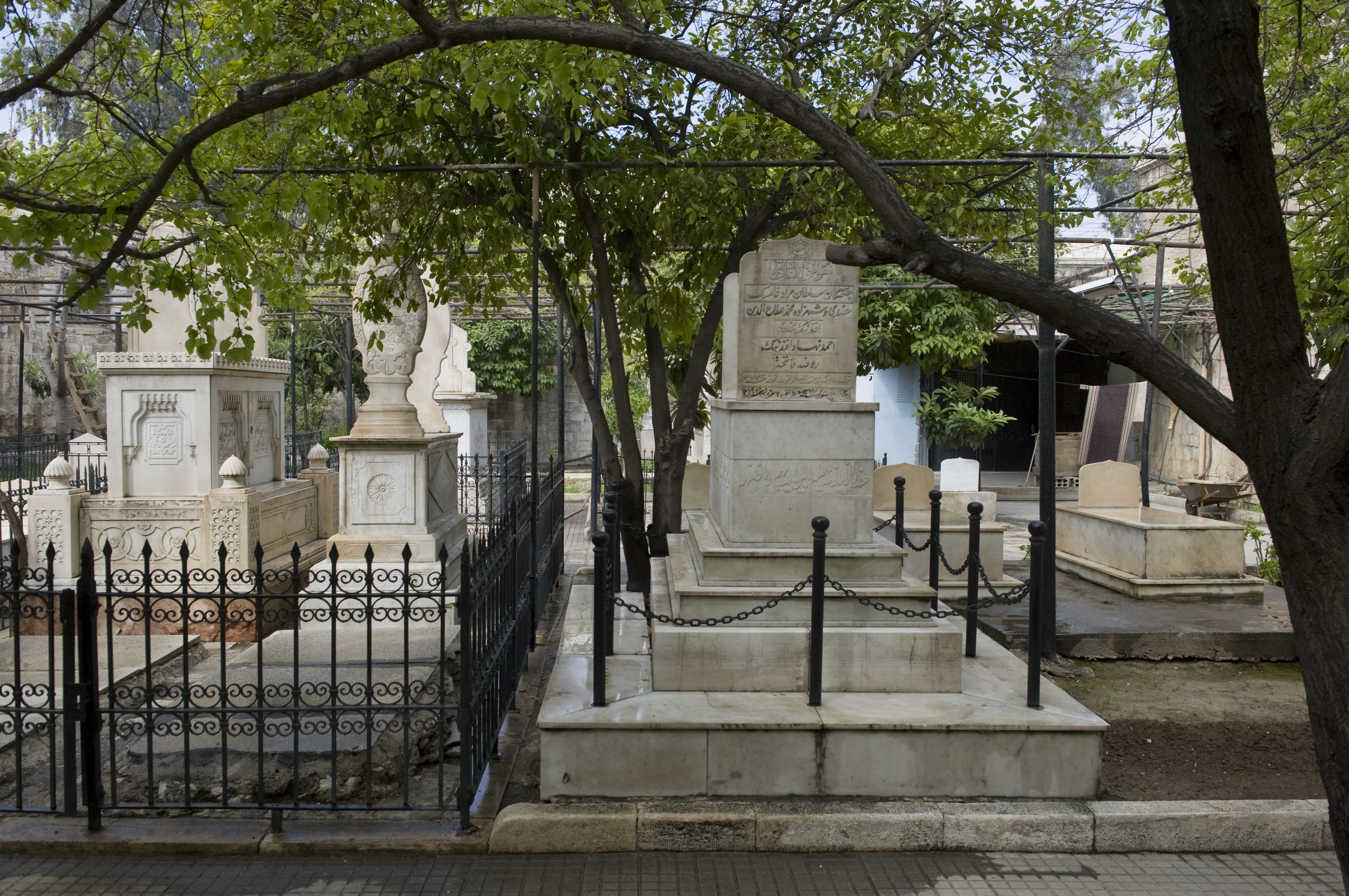
Grave of Ahmed Nihad, head of the imperial family from 1944 to 1954

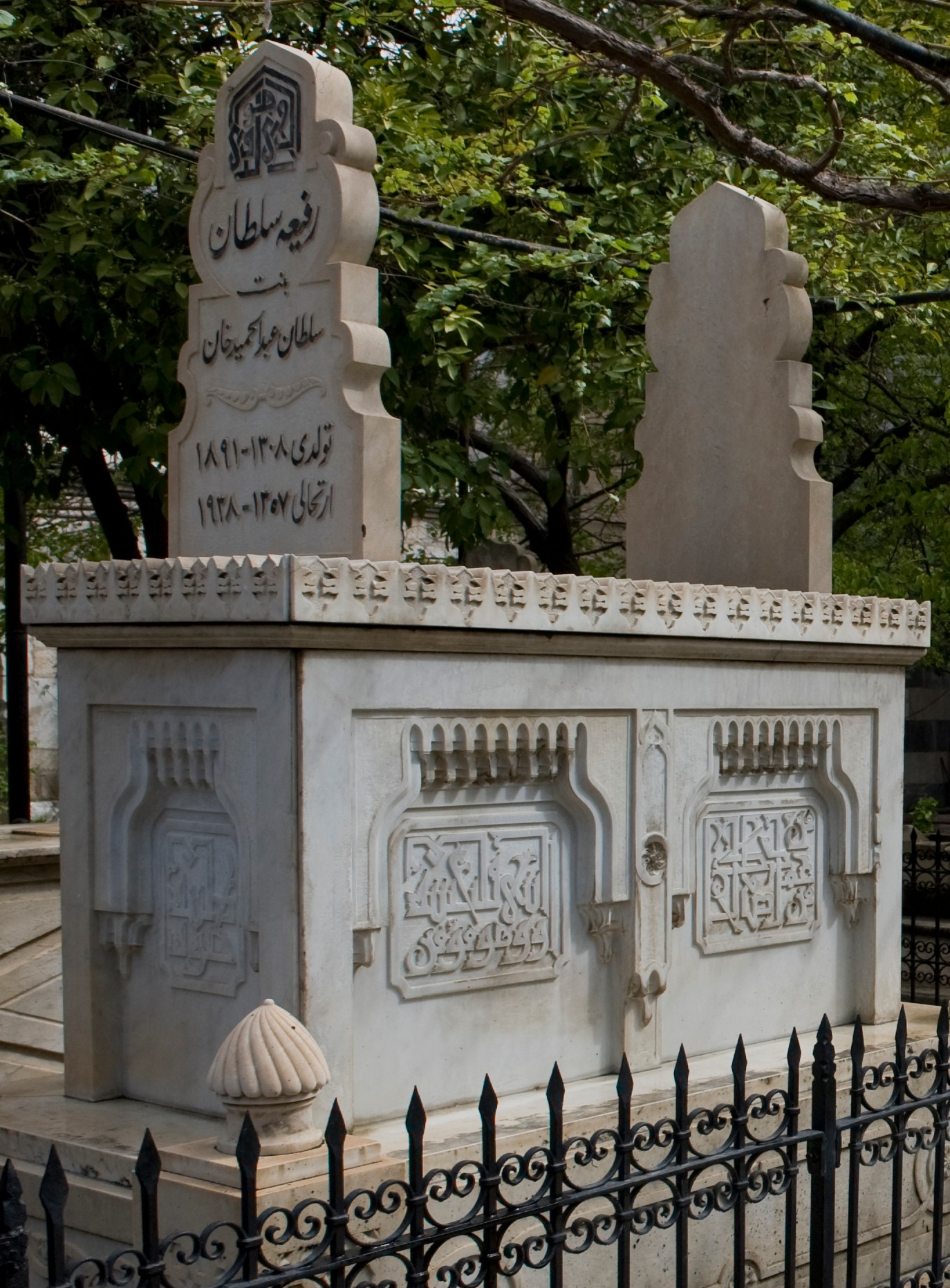
Grave of Refia Sultan, daughter of Abdul Hamid II

== See also ==
- Sunni Islam in Syria
- List of mosques in Syria
