= Salimiyya Madrasa =

Coordinates: 33°30′45″N 36°17′32″E

- المَدْرَسَة السَّلِيمِيَّة
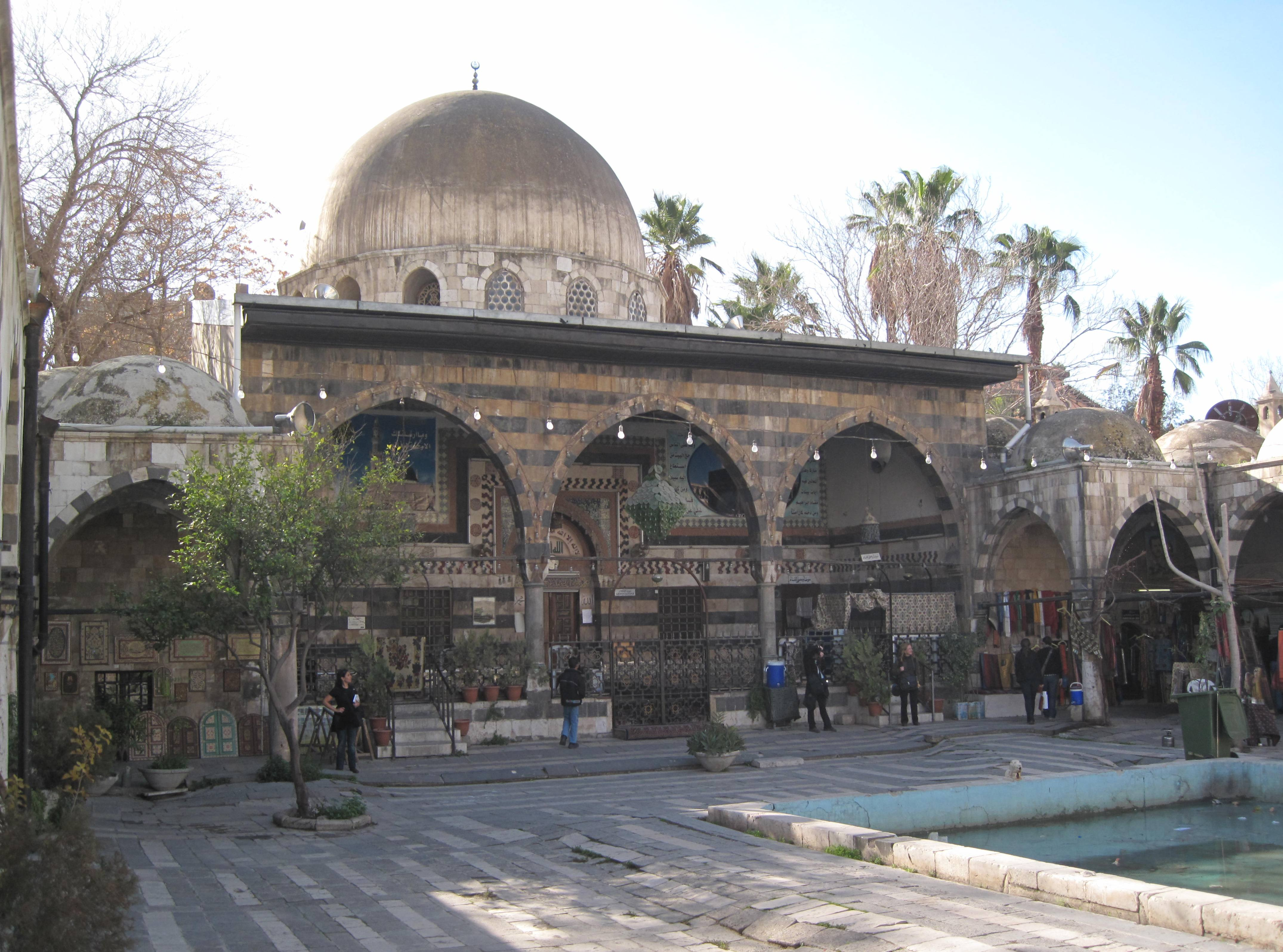
- Damascus; Syria

Information
- Type: Ottoman
- Established: 1566
- Founder: possibly Süleyman I, otherwise Selim II
- Campus: Urban
- Affiliation: Islamic

The Salimiyya Madrasa (Arabic: المَدْرَسَة السَّلِيمِيَّة, romanized: al-Madrasa as-Salīmiyya) is a 16th-century madrasa in Damascus, Syria. It is part of the Sulaymaniyya Takiyya, started under the Ottoman sultan Süleyman I.

The madrasa was built after the rest of the complex, with stones which had been left over. It is possible that the madrasa was ordered by Süleyman himself right before his death in 1566 as it was called the "Sulaymaniyya Madrasa" in some sources upon completion, but over time it became known as the "Salimiyya Madrasa" (after Süleyman's son Selim II).
