= Bostanlı, Havsa =

Village in Turkey

Bostanlı
- Village
- Location within Turkey Location within Marmara
- Coordinates: 41.6111°N 26.9686°E
- Country: Turkey
- Province: Edirne
- District: Havsa
- Population (2022): 142
- Time zone: UTC+3 (TRT)

Bostanlı is a village in the Havsa District of Edirne Province in Turkey. The village had a population of 142 in 2022.
