= Abalar, Havsa =

Village in Turkey

Abalar
- Village
- Location within Turkey Location within Marmara
- Coordinates: 41°32′50″N 26°44′32″E
- Country: Turkey
- Province: Edirne
- District: Havsa
- Population (2022): 1,000
- Time zone: UTC+3 (TRT)

Abalar is a village in the Havsa District of Edirne Province in Turkey. The village had a population of 1,000 in 2022.
