= Havsa =

- Municipality
- Sokullu Mehmet Pasha Bazaar and Prayer Dome, Havsa

- Location within Turkey Location within Marmara
- Coordinates: 41°32′57″N 26°49′18″E
- Country: Turkey
- Province: Edirne
- District: Havsa

Government
  - Mayor: Huseyin Özden (CHP)
- Elevation: 26 m (85 ft)
- Population (2022): 8,702
- Time zone: UTC+3 (TRT)
- Postal code: 22530
- Area code: 0284
- Website: www.havsa.bel.tr

Havsa (Greek: Νίκη) is a town in Edirne Province of Turkey. It is the seat of Havsa District. Its population is 8,702 (2022). The mayor is Huseyin Özden (CHP).

== History ==
Havsa was founded as Nike by Greek colonists. When the empire split into two, the city came under the Byzantine Empire. In 1362, the land was captured by Turks under the leadership of Murat I and the area was named Hosa. After Edirne became the center of the Ottoman Empire, the Rûm population in Hosa abandoned the city and moved to Istanbul and Thessaloniki. After the capture of Constantinople, Turks from Anatolia moved in, making the town Turkish.

== Geography ==
The town is 21 kilometers away from Edirne, and 218 kilometers from Istanbul.

== Name ==
The town was called Hosa by the Turks in 1331. After Hafsa Hatun moved to the town, it was called Hafsa. Later, the two names were combined to form the current name Havsa.
