= List of municipalities in Edirne Province =

This is the list of municipalities in Edirne Province, Turkey as of March 2023.

District	Municipality
Edirne	Edirne
Enez	Enez
Havsa	Havsa
İpsala	Esetçe
İpsala	İpsala
İpsala	Yenikarpuzlu
Keşan	Beğendik
Keşan	Keşan
Keşan	Yenimuhacir
Lalapaşa	Lalapaşa
Meriç	Küplü
Meriç	Meriç
Meriç	Subaşı
Süloğlu	Süloğlu
Uzunköprü	Kırcasalih
Uzunköprü	Uzunköprü
