= Botaş Saros FSRU Terminal =

- Interactive map of Botaş Saros FSRU Terminal
- Location of the FSRU terminal in the Gulf of Saros, Turkey
- Native name: BOTAŞ Saros FSRU Limanı

Location
- Country: Turkey
- Location: Gulf of Saros
- Coordinates: 40°38′17″N 26°38′22″E

Details
- Opened: under construction
- Owned by: BOTAŞ
- Type of Harbor: FSRU terminal
- Land area: 52.3 ha (129 acres)
- No. of berths: 1
- Ship types: 2
- No. of piers: 1
- Draft depth: 12 m (39 ft)

Statistics
- Passenger traffic: No

Botaş Saros FSRU Terminal (Turkish: BOTAŞ Saros FSRU Limanı) is a liquefied natural gas (LNG) terminal in Turkey. Owned by the Turkish state-owned corporation BOTAŞ, it is located at the northeastern shore of the Gulf of Saros in Turkey. It will be used for converting LNG imported by LNG carriers back to natural gas using a floating storage regasification unit (FSRU), and transferring the natural gas into the national pipeline network system. Projected in 2019, the construction works started in November 2020, and it is expected to be completed in early 2023. All legal efforts to stop the project due to environmental concerns failed.

== FSRU terminal ==
In 2019, the state-owned Turkish oil and gas pipeline corporation BOTAŞ started a project to build a floating liquefied natural gas (LNG) terminal, called a floating storage regasification unit (FSRU) terminal, in the northeastern shore of the Gulf of Saros, northern Aegean Sea, between the Cape Bekirçavuş and Köpekli Creak. It is about 4 km (2.5 mi) southeast of Gökçetepe village and about 3.5 km (2.2 mi) southwest of Sazlıdere village in Keşan district of Edirne Province. The facility's distance to the 2010-declared "Saros Special Environmental Protection Area" ("Saros Özel Çevre Koruma Bölgesi") is 2.8 km (1.7 mi), to the "Gökçetepe Nature Park" ("Gökçetepe Tabiat Parkı") around 3.4 km (2.1 mi) and to the "Mecidiye Pond Drinking water Absolute Protection Area" ("Mecidiye Göleti içme suyu mutlak koruma alanı") about 6 km (3.7 mi). The terminal covers an area of around 52.3 ha (129 acres). 85,000 m^{3} (3,000,000 cu ft) of earth was used for sea filling to gain an area of 13,000 m^{2} (140,000 sq ft).

An FSRU terminal has a different feature from other land LNG terminals. The storage and regasification service of LNG imported by LNG carriers is provided by a ship called FSRU, which is permanently moored at the terminal pier. The FSRU has the ability to convert natural gas in liquid form stored in the FSRU tanks into gas form by using the existing regasification units. In addition to the 270 m (890 ft)-long pier, the Saros FSRU terminal consists of a breakwater and a berth on earth filling for mooring of tugboats and pilot boats. There is also a control building at the connection point of the pier to the shore. The depth of the sea at the pier is 12 m (39 ft) to allow the mooring of LNG carriers up to 345 m (1,132 ft) long and 100,000 DWT. The facility is connected to the national natural gas network system with a 17 km (11 mi)-long land pipeline to transfer natural gas to the Marmara region, which has a significant portion of the country's natural gas consumption.

The construction project is carried out by the Limak Holding. The construction started in November 2020. BOTAŞ announced in November 2021 that the FSRU Terminal will go into service by the end of the first half of 2022. In mid-December 2022, the Ministry of Energy and Natural Resources announced that the FSRUterminal will be commissioned in January 2023. It was added that negotiations for LNG import from Oman are continuing.

== Environmental concerns ==
In the past, the region was declared a "Saros Special Environmental Protection Area" by the Ministry of Environment, Urbanisation and Climate Change, and a "Gulf of Saros Culture and Tourism Development Zone" ("Saros Körfezi Kültür Turizm Gelişim Bölgesi") by the Ministry of Culture and Tourism. The gulf is habitat for 144 fish species, 78 species of aquatic plants and 34 species of sponges.

Local people, working together as "Saros Volunteers Solidarity" ("Saros Gönüllüleri Dayanışma"), have been protesting against the FSRU terminal project, and a group of 1,038 residents filed a court case to stop the construction project. In the course of the court case, three separate expert reports were presented revealing that the project was contrary to many aspects of civil engineering, agriculture, fishery, geology, hydrogeology, biology and forestry. The construction of the FSRU terminal project continued in the Gulf of Saros despite the court decision and the expert reports expressing negative views. Construction equipment entered the area without the knowledge of the landowner, and started working despite the last expert report stated that the local zoning plans were not in conformity with the planning principles and principles of urbanism. By March 2020, the Administrative Court of Edirne ruled that the FSRU terminal construction project in the Gulf of Saros was against the public interest law and science, and cancelled the Environmental impact assessment (EIA) report ("Çevresel Etki Değerlendirmesi ÇED raporu") from 31 May 2018, which had a positive attitude for the construction. The legal attempts to stop the work did not yield any results. In June 2021, the court cancelled the EIA report a second time, and ordered stay of execution.

On 31 May 2022, "Saros Volunteers Solidarity", supported by the Keşan City Council, visited all political parties in the Grand National Assembly of Turkey in Ankara, and presented a file. A parliamentary research proposal was submitted by the opposition parties on 15 June 2022 to "investigate the damage to people and nature in the Gulf of Saros caused by the BOTAŞ project". The parliamentary research motion was rejected by the votes of the ruling party AKP and its supporting party MHP.

According to environmental organizations, more than ten thousand trees were cut down in the forest area as a 17 km (11 mi)-long land pipeline was laid. They claim that the mud produced during the construction of the terminal pier killed the aquatic plants on the seabed, and used oil from the construction equipment polluted the sea. They are concerns that it will not be possible to clear up an LNG spill in the still and shallow waters of the gulf in the event of pipeline leaks. It is feared that an eventual explosion at an LNG carrier may have serious consequences. Leaked LNG from the vessel can catch fire, and could spread to the forest on the shore. The terminal is situated in a first-grade earthquake zone, and is about 7 km (4.3 mi) close to the Ganos Fault, which could produce an earthquake greater than M_{s}.

== See also ==
- Botaş Dörtyol LNG Storage Facility
