= Küçükdoğanca =

Küçükdoğanca can refer to:

- Küçükdoğanca, İpsala
- Küçükdoğanca, Keşan
