= Kumdere =

Kumdere can refer to:

- Kumdere, İpsala
- Kumdere, Tarsus
