= Korucu =

Korucu can refer to:

- Village guard system
- Korucu, Edirne
- Korucu, Elâzığ
- Korucu, İpsala
