= Kocahıdır =

- Village
- Location within Turkey Location within Marmara
- Coordinates: 40°49′N 26°24′E
- Country: Turkey
- Province: Edirne
- District: İpsala
- Elevation: 20 m (66 ft)
- Population (2022): 985
- Time zone: UTC+3 (TRT)
- Postal code: 22480
- Area code: 0284

Kocahıdır is a village in İpsala District of Edirne Province, Turkey. The village had a population of 985 in 2022. Kocahıdır is 17 kilometres (11 mi) south east of İpsala. The village is divided into three parts by two parallel creeks flowing to south west. Kocahıdır was founded in 1893 by 66 Muslim families from Bulgaria. In 1938 during another migration, Muslim families from Romania were also settled in Kocahıdır. Between 1999 and the 2013 reorganisation, it was a town (belde). Most important economic sector of the town is dairying.
