= İbriktepe =

- Village
- Location within Turkey Location within Marmara
- Coordinates: 41°0′42″N 26°30′10″E
- Country: Turkey
- Province: Edirne
- District: İpsala
- Population (2022): 1,127
- Time zone: UTC+3 (TRT)
- Area code: 0284

İbriktepe (Albanian: Qytezë) is a village in the İpsala District, Edirne Province in northwestern Turkey. The village had a population of 1,127 in 2022. Situated at the Turkey-Greece border, the village is 25 km (16 mi) away from İpsala and 100 km (62 mi) far from Edirne. Before the 2013 reorganisation, it was a town (belde).

İbriktepe is famous for having been the birthplace of Albanian politician and founder of the Albanian Orthodox Church, Fan Noli. At the time of Noli's birth a small Albanian-speaking Orthodox community lived in the town. It had an Ayos Georgios church built in 1837. A bust of him was placed in the town in January 2011.

Today, the village formerly known as Qyteza is partly inhabited by Alevi Turks.
