= Mecidiye, Edirne =

Mecidiye
- Village
- Location within Turkey Location within Marmara
- Coordinates: 40°36′N 26°32′E
- Country: Turkey
- Province: Edirne
- District: Keşan
- Elevation: 32 m (105 ft)
- Population (2022): 840
- Time zone: UTC+3 (TRT)
- Postal code: 22910
- Area code: 0284

Mecidiye (formerly: Köseatlı) is a village in Keşan District of Edirne Province, Turkey. Its population is 840 (2022). Mecidiye is close to the Gulf of Saros (Aegean Sea). The distance to Keşan is 28 kilometres (17 mi). The settlement was founded by the Muslim refugees of the Russo-Turkish War (1877-1878). Before the 2013 reorganisation, it was a town (belde). Major economic activities of the town are fishing, beekeeping and farming. Tourism is also promising.
