= Gulf of Saros =

Large bay/gulf in western Turkey

Coordinates: 40°33′0″N 26°27′36″E

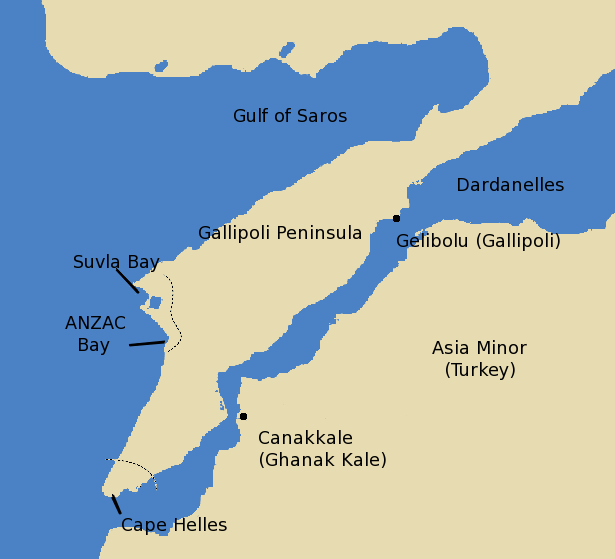

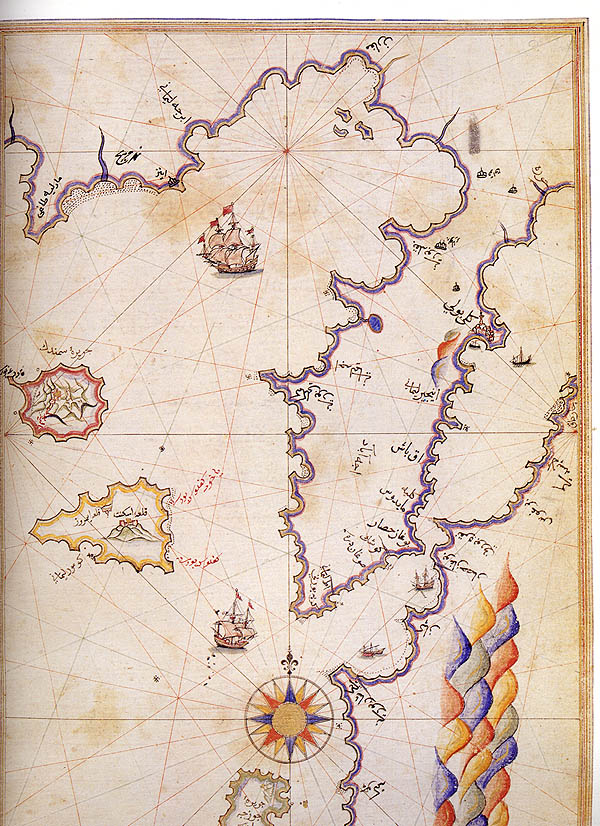
Historic map of Saros Bay by Piri Reis

Gulf of Saros or Saros Bay (Turkish: Saros Körfezi) is a gulf north of the Dardanelles, Turkey. Its ancient name was the Gulf of Melas (Greek: Μέλανας κόλπος, romanized: Mélanas kólpos).

The bay is 75 km (47 mi) long and 35 km (22 mi) wide. Far from industrialized areas and thanks to underwater currents, it is a popular summer vacation area with sandy beaches and clear water. Scuba diving, windsurfing and fishing are the most practiced water sports here.

Settlements around the bay are: Gökçetepe, Mecidiye, Erikli, Danişment, Yayla, Karaincirli, Vakıf, Büyükevren, Sultaniçe, Gülçavuş and Enez, all in Edirne Province. The islands of Gökçeada (Imbros), Turkey, and Samothrace, Greece, lie beyond it in the northeast Aegean Sea.

Part of the North Anatolian Fault Zone lies within the Gulf.

== Non-combat military incident ==
In the fall of 1992, the Turkish destroyer Muavenet was hit by two Sea Sparrow missiles fired by the U.S. aircraft carrier USS Saratoga during the NATO exercise "Display Determination" held in the bay. The incident killed five Turkish sailors, and seriously injured 22 others.

== See also ==
- Battle of Gallipoli
- Botaş Saros FSRU Terminal, under construction as of 2022
