= Fatih, İpsala =

Village in Turkey

Fatih
- Neighbourhood
- Location in Turkey Fatih (Marmara)
- Coordinates: 40.8944°N 26.3730°E
- Country: Turkey
- Province: Edirne
- District: İpsala
- Municipality: İpsala
- Population (2022): 302
- Time zone: UTC+3 (TRT)

Fatih (formerly: Ahırköy) is a neighbourhood of the town İpsala, İpsala District, Edirne Province, Turkey. Its population is 302 (2022). Its postal code is 22490.
