= İzzetiye, Keşan =

Village in Turkey

İzzetiye
- Neighbourhood
- Location in Turkey İzzetiye (Marmara)
- Coordinates: 40°48′44″N 26°38′51″E
- Country: Turkey
- Province: Edirne
- District: Keşan
- Municipality: Keşan
- Population (2022): 1,135
- Time zone: UTC+3 (TRT)

İzzetiye is a neighbourhood of the town Keşan, Keşan District, Edirne Province, Turkey. Its population is 1,135 (2022).
