= Aliçopehlivan =

Aliçopehlivan Koyunyeri
- Village
- Location within Turkey Location within Marmara
- Coordinates: 40°51′N 26°26′E
- Country: Turkey
- Province: Edirne
- District: İpsala
- Elevation: 55 m (180 ft)
- Population (2022): 1,782
- Time zone: UTC+3 (TRT)
- Postal code: 22490
- Area code: 0284

Aliçopehlivan (formerly Koyunyeri) is a village in the İpsala District of Edirne Province, Turkey. Its population is 1,782 (2022).

It is situated in the plains of Rumeli (East Thrace). The distance to İpsala is 15 kilometres (9.3 mi) and to Edirne is 140 kilometres (87 mi). During the Russo-Turkish War (1877-1878), the Muslim population (Turks and Pomaks) of the villages Lukovit and Koynare (both in modern Bulgaria) escaped from the Russian armies and were settled in the newly founded Koyunyeri (literally "place of sheep"), which refers to the ranges for sheep around the village and also bears semblance to the refugees' old village's name, Koynare.

A wrestler named Aliço, who won the Kırkpınar oil wrestling tournament for 27 consecutive years, was a resident of Koyunyeri, and in 1998, the village was renamed after Aliço (Aliçopehlivan literally means "wrestler Aliço").

Today, most of village residents either work in the dairy farms or in rice fields.
