= Yakub Beg =

Yakub Beg, Yakub Bey, or Ya'qub Beg may refer to:

== People ==
- Yakub I of Germiyan (died c. 1340), bey of Germiyan
- Yakub II (died 1429), bey of Germiyan
- Yakup Bey Muzaka (died 1442), Ottoman sanjak-bey of Albania
- Yaqub (Aq Qoyunlu) (died 1490), sultan of the Aq Qoyunlu
- Yakub Beg of Yettishar (c. 1820–1877), emir of Yettishar

== Places ==
- Yakupbey, Meriç, a village in Edirne Province, Turkey
