= Hıdırköy =

Hıdırköy can refer to:

- Hıdırköy, Bandırma
- Hıdırköy, İpsala
