= Paşayiğit =

- Neighbourhood
- Location in Turkey Paşayiğit (Marmara)
- Coordinates: 40°57′N 26°38′E
- Country: Turkey
- Province: Edirne
- District: Keşan
- Municipality: Keşan
- Elevation: 190 m (620 ft)
- Population (2022): 1,308
- Time zone: UTC+3 (TRT)
- Postal code: 22920
- Area code: 0284

Paşayiğit is a neighbourhood of the town Keşan, Keşan District, Edirne Province, Turkey. Its population is 1,308 (2022). It is situated on Turkish state highway D.550 which connects Keşan to Edirne. Its distance to Keşan is 12 kilometres (7.5 mi) and to Edirne is 100 kilometres (62 mi).

The name of the town refers to a certain Paşayiğit, a Turkmen leader from Saruhan (present Manisa, Turkey) who captured the town on behalf of the Ottoman Empire in the 14th century. Although Paşayiğit preserved its Greek character up to 20th century, after the Turkish War of Independence, according to population exchange agreement, Greek population was replaced by Turkish population from Drama, Greece. Between 1999 and the 2013 reorganisation, it was a town (belde).
