= Balabancık =

Balabancık can refer to:

- Balabancık, İpsala
- Balabancık, Mudanya
