= Gündüzler =

Gündüzler can refer to:

- Gündüzler, Keşan
- Gündüzler, Silifke
