= Meriç District =

District of Edirne Province, Turkey

- District
- Map showing Meriç District in Edirne Province

- Location in Turkey Meriç District (Marmara)
- Coordinates: 41°11′N 26°25′E
- Country: Turkey
- Province: Edirne
- Seat: Meriç

Government
  - Kaymakam: Uğur Kapar
- Area: 438 km^{2} (169 sq mi)
- Population (2022): 12,841
  - Density: 29/km^{2} (76/sq mi)
- Time zone: UTC+3 (TRT)
- Website: www.meric.gov.tr

Meriç District is a district of the Edirne Province of Turkey. Its seat is the town of Meriç. Its area is 438 km^{2}, and its population is 12,841 (2022). The district shares a 56 kilometer long border with Greece to the north and west. Uzunköprü District is located to the east and south-east. To the south is İpsala District.

== Composition ==
There are three municipalities in Meriç District:

- Küplü
- Meriç
- Subaşı

There are 21 villages in Meriç District:

- Adasarhanlı
- Akçadam
- Akıncılar
- Alibey
- Büyükaltıağaç
- Hasırcıarnavutköy
- Kadıdondurma
- Karahamza
- Karayusuflu
- Kavaklı
- Küçükaltıağaç
- Küpdere
- Nasuhbey
- Olacak
- Paşayenice
- Rahmanca
- Saatağacı
- Serem
- Umurca
- Yakupbey
- Yenicegörüce
