= Sarpdere =

'Sarpdere can refer to:

- Sarpdere, Ezine
- Sarpdere, İpsala
