= Tevfikiye =

Tevfikiye (Ottoman Turkish: توفیقیه) may refer to the following places in Turkey:

- Tevfikiye, Alaca
- Tevfikiye, Çanakkale
- Tevfikiye, İpsala
