= Şabanmera, Keşan =

Village in Turkey

Şabanmera
- Village
- Location within Turkey Location within Marmara
- Coordinates: 40°41′N 26°24′E
- Country: Turkey
- Province: Edirne
- District: Keşan
- Population (2022): 218
- Time zone: UTC+3 (TRT)

Şabanmera is a village in the Keşan District of Edirne Province in Turkey. Its population is 218 (2022).
