= Karlı, Keşan =

Village in Turkey

Karlı
- Village
- Location within Turkey Location within Marmara
- Coordinates: 40.7444°N 26.5477°E
- Country: Turkey
- Province: Edirne
- District: Keşan
- Population (2022): 339
- Time zone: UTC+3 (TRT)

Karlı is a village in the Keşan District of Edirne Province in Turkey. Its population is 339 (2022).
