= Pazardere, İpsala =

Village in Turkey

Pazardere
- Village
- Location within Turkey Location within Marmara
- Coordinates: 40°59′N 26°35′E
- Country: Turkey
- Province: Edirne
- District: İpsala
- Population (2022): 413
- Time zone: UTC+3 (TRT)

Pazardere is a village in the İpsala District of Edirne Province in Turkey. The village had a population of 413 in 2022.
