= Orhaniye, Keşan =

Village in Turkey

Orhaniye
- Village
- Location within Turkey Location within Marmara
- Coordinates: 40.7325°N 26.4325°E
- Country: Turkey
- Province: Edirne
- District: Keşan
- Population (2022): 322
- Time zone: UTC+3 (TRT)

Orhaniye is a village in the Keşan District of Edirne Province in Turkey. Its population is 322 (2022).
