= Şükrüköy, Keşan =

Village in Turkey

Şükrüköy
- Village
- Location within Turkey Location within Marmara
- Coordinates: 40°47′N 26°43′E
- Country: Turkey
- Province: Edirne
- District: Keşan
- Population (2022): 183
- Time zone: UTC+3 (TRT)

Şükrüköy is a village in the Keşan District of Edirne Province in Turkey. Its population is 183 (2022).
