= Akıncılar, Meriç =

Village in Turkey

Akıncılar
- Village
- Location within Turkey Location within Marmara
- Coordinates: 41.1926°N 26.5177°E
- Country: Turkey
- Province: Edirne
- District: Meriç
- Population (2022): 98
- Time zone: UTC+3 (TRT)

Akıncılar is a village in the Meriç District of Edirne Province in Turkey. The village had a population of 98 in 2022.
