= Rahmanca, Meriç =

Village in Edirne Province, Turkey

Rahmanca
- Village
- Location within Turkey Location within Marmara
- Coordinates: 41°17′N 26°29′E
- Country: Turkey
- Province: Edirne
- District: Meriç
- Population (2022): 219
- Time zone: UTC+3 (TRT)

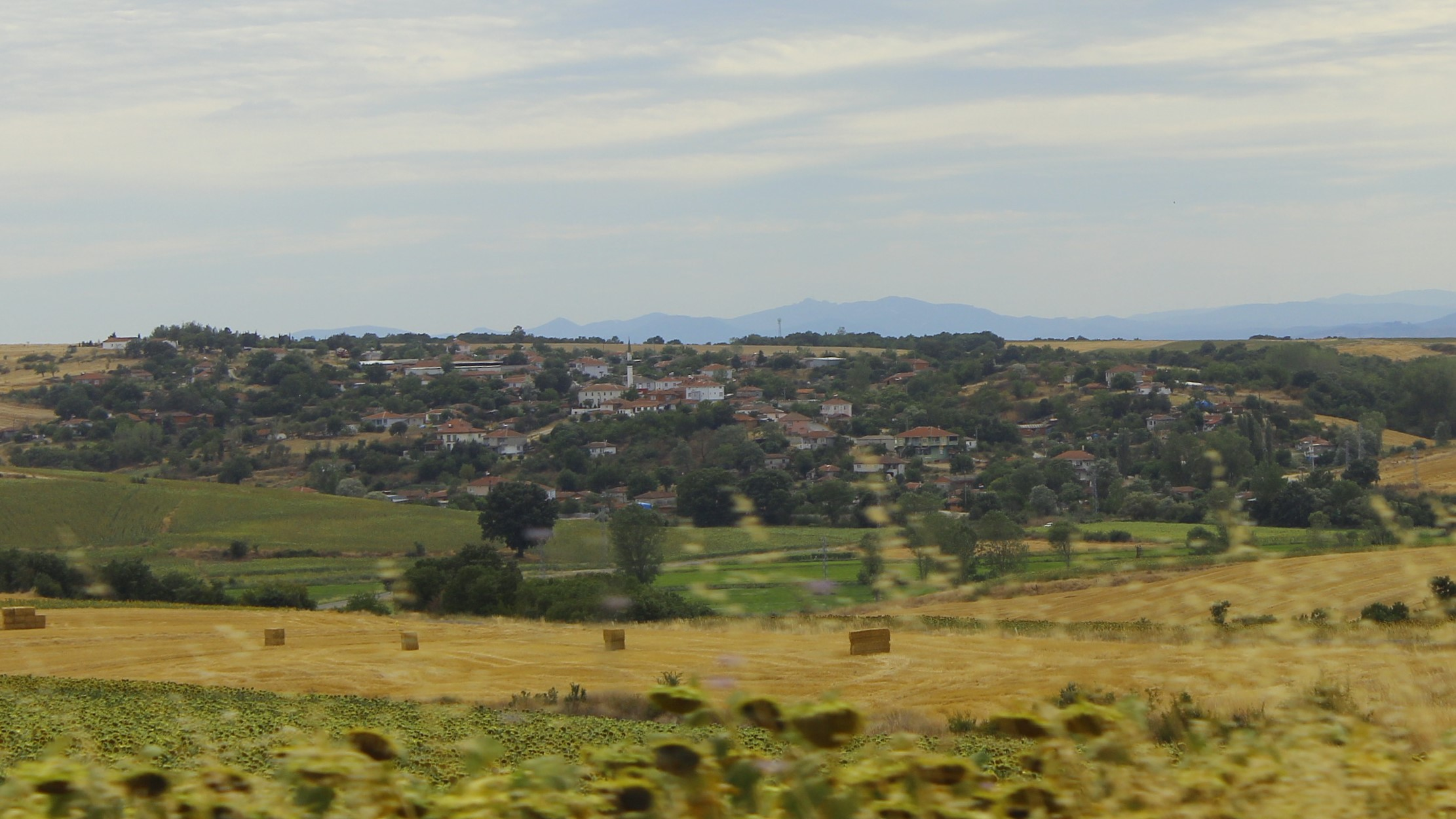

Rahmanca is a village in the Meriç District of Edirne Province in Turkey. The village had a population of 219 in 2022.
