= Büyükaltıağaç, Meriç =

Village in Turkey

Büyükaltıağaç
- Village
- Location within Turkey Location within Marmara
- Coordinates: 41°07′N 26°24′E
- Country: Turkey
- Province: Edirne
- District: Meriç
- Population (2022): 590
- Time zone: UTC+3 (TRT)

Büyükaltıağaç is a village in the Meriç District of Edirne Province in Turkey. The village had a population of 590 in 2022.
