= Sultan, Edirne =

Sultan
- Village
- Location within Turkey Location within Marmara
- Coordinates: 41°01′N 26°27′E
- Country: Turkey
- Province: Edirne
- District: İpsala
- Elevation: 50 m (160 ft)
- Population (2022): 1,155
- Time zone: UTC+3 (TRT)
- Postal code: 22480
- Area code: 0284

Sultan is a village in İpsala District of Edirne Province, Turkey. Its population is 1,155 (2022). It is situated to the west of Sultanköy Dam. The distance to İpsala is 14 kilometres (8.7 mi). The settlement was founded in 1924 by the Turkish refugees from Greece as a result of Population exchange agreement between Greece and Turkey. In 1934 refugees from Romania and in 1951 refugees from Bulgaria were also settled in the settlement. Before the 2013 reorganisation, it was a town (belde). Main economic activities are dairying and agriculture. Main crops are cereals, sunflower and sugarbeet.
