= Kadıköy, Keşan =

Village in Turkey

Kadıköy
- Village
- Location within Turkey Location within Marmara
- Coordinates: 40.781°N 26.774°E
- Country: Turkey
- Province: Edirne
- District: Keşan
- Population (2022): 413
- Time zone: UTC+3 (TRT)

Kadıköy is a village in the Keşan District of Edirne Province in Turkey. Its population is 413 (2022).
