= Karaağaç, İpsala =

Karaağaç
- Village
- Location within Turkey Location within Marmara
- Coordinates: 41°3′43″N 26°31′48″E
- Country: Turkey
- Province: Edirne
- District: İpsala
- Elevation: 53 m (174 ft)
- Population (2022): 200
- Time zone: UTC+3 (TRT)
- Postal code: 22480
- Area code: 0284

Karaağaç is a village in the İpsala District of Edirne Province in northwestern Turkey. The village had a population of 200 in 2022.
