= Turpçular, İpsala =

Village in Turkey

Turpçular
- Village
- Location within Turkey Location within Marmara
- Coordinates: 40°56′N 26°26′E
- Country: Turkey
- Province: Edirne
- District: İpsala
- Population (2022): 510
- Time zone: UTC+3 (TRT)

Turpçular is a village in the İpsala District of Edirne Province in Turkey. The village had a population of 510 in 2022.
