= Maltepe, Keşan =

Village in Turkey

Maltepe
- Village
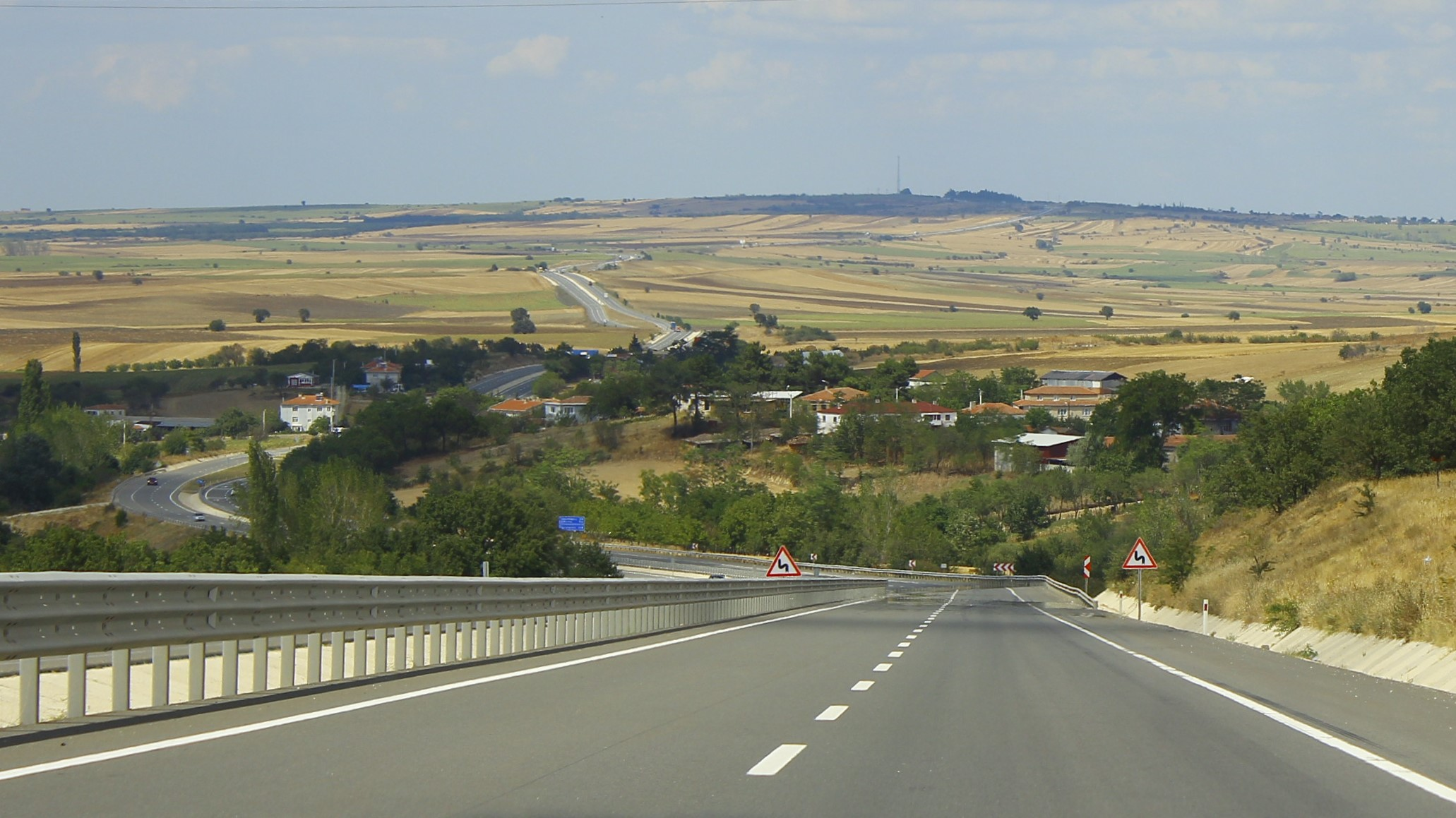
- The village of Maltepe, seen in the distance. Photo taken in 2023.

- Location within Turkey Location within Marmara
- Coordinates: 40°59′N 26°38′E
- Country: Turkey
- Province: Edirne
- District: Keşan
- Population (2022): 259
- Time zone: UTC+3 (TRT)

Maltepe is a village in the Keşan District of Edirne Province in Turkey. Its population is 259 (2022).
