= Beğendik, Keşan =

Beğendik Kilisköy
- Municipality
- Location in Turkey Beğendik (Marmara)
- Coordinates: 40°56′N 26°34′E
- Country: Turkey
- Province: Edirne
- District: Keşan
- Elevation: 120 m (390 ft)
- Population (2022): 3,206
- Time zone: UTC+3 (TRT)
- Postal code: 22880
- Area code: 0284

Beğendik is a town (belde) in the Keşan District, Edirne Province, Turkey. Its population is 3,206 (2022). It is 10 kilometres (6.2 mi) from Keşan and about 115 kilometres (71 mi) from Edirne. Meriç River and Greece border are about 20 kilometres (12 mi) west of the town.

Prior to the 20th century, the population of the village was composed of Greeks and the Greek name of the village was Ηρωικό (Heroic). According to tradition, the creator of its Turkish name was Lala Şahin Pasha of the Ottoman Empire in the 14th century (Beğendik means "We liked"). Beğendik preserved its Greek character up to the 20th century. After the Turkish War of Independence, according to the population exchange agreement, the Greek population was replaced by Turkish population.

In 1969, Beğendik was declared a seat of the township.
