= Yapıldak, İpsala =

Village in Turkey

Yapıldak
- Village
- Location within Turkey Location within Marmara
- Coordinates: 40.7925°N 26.443333°E
- Country: Turkey
- Province: Edirne
- District: İpsala
- Population (2022): 334
- Time zone: UTC+3 (TRT)

Yapıldak is a village in the İpsala District of Edirne Province in Turkey. The village had a population of 334 in 2022.
