= Çelebi, Keşan =

Village in Keşan Province, Turkey

Çelebi
- Village
- Location within Turkey Location within Marmara
- Country: Turkey
- Province: Edirne
- District: Keşan
- Population (2022): 93
- Time zone: UTC+3 (TRT)

Çelebi is a village in the Keşan District of Edirne Province in Turkey. Its population is 93 (2022).
