= Akçadam, Meriç =

Village in Turkey

Akçadam
- Village
- Location within Turkey Location within Marmara
- Coordinates: 41.3043°N 26.5303°E
- Country: Turkey
- Province: Edirne
- District: Meriç
- Population (2022): 463
- Time zone: UTC+3 (TRT)

Akçadam is a village in the Meriç District of Edirne Province in Turkey. The village had a population of 463 in 2022.
