= Çobançeşmesi, Keşan =

Village in Turkey

Çobançeşmesi
- Village
- Location within Turkey Location within Marmara
- Coordinates: 40.9586°N 26.6692°E
- Country: Turkey
- Province: Edirne
- District: Keşan
- Population (2022): 344
- Time zone: UTC+3 (TRT)

Çobançeşmesi is a village in the Keşan District of Edirne Province in Turkey. Its population is 344 (2022).
