= Altıntaş, Keşan =

Village in Turkey

Altıntaş
- Village
- Location within Turkey Location within Marmara
- Coordinates: 41.0085°N 26.7047°E
- Country: Turkey
- Province: Edirne
- District: Keşan
- Population (2022): 374
- Time zone: UTC+3 (TRT)

Altıntaş is a village in the Keşan District of Edirne Province in Turkey. Its population is 374 (2022).
