= Karayusuflu, Meriç =

Village in Turkey

Karayusuflu
- Village
- Location within Turkey Location within Marmara
- Country: Turkey
- Province: Edirne
- District: Meriç
- Population (2022): 248
- Time zone: UTC+3 (TRT)

Karayusuflu is a village in the Meriç District of Edirne Province in Turkey. The village had a population of 248 in 2022.
