= Yenicegörüce, Meriç =

Village in Turkey

Yenicegörüce
- Village
- Location within Turkey Location within Marmara
- Coordinates: 41°08′N 26°28′E
- Country: Turkey
- Province: Edirne
- District: Meriç
- Population (2022): 357
- Time zone: UTC+3 (TRT)

Yenicegörüce (also: Yenicegörice) is a village in the Meriç District of Edirne Province in Turkey. The village had a population of 357 in 2022.
