= Kavaklı, Meriç =

Village in Turkey

Kavaklı
- Village
- Location within Turkey Location within Marmara
- Country: Turkey
- Province: Edirne
- District: Meriç
- Population (2022): 332
- Time zone: UTC+3 (TRT)

Kavaklı is a village in the Meriç District of Edirne Province in Turkey. The village had a population of 332 in 2022.
