= Beyköy, Keşan =

Village in Turkey

Beyköy
- Village
- Location within Turkey Location within Marmara
- Coordinates: 40.6681°N 26.5110°E
- Country: Turkey
- Province: Edirne
- District: Keşan
- Population (2022): 127
- Time zone: UTC+3 (TRT)

Beyköy is a village in the Keşan District of Edirne Province in Turkey. Its population is 127 (2022).
