= Karahamza, Meriç =

Village in Turkey

Karahamza
- Village
- Location within Turkey Location within Marmara
- Country: Turkey
- Province: Edirne
- District: Meriç
- Population (2022): 112
- Time zone: UTC+3 (TRT)

Karahamza is a village in the Meriç District of Edirne Province in Turkey. The village gets its name from the yacht within its borders. Karahamza village is a former Greek village. The Greeks in the village were sent to Greece due to the population exchange signed in 1923. Those who live in the village of Karahamza today are the result of exchange in Greece Kavala they were placed in Karahamza village in May 1924 as 60 households from the village of Shurdilva, which is connected to the Drama district of the province. It is believed that an ancient tomb located in the village and about 2.5 meters tall belonged to the father of Hamza, the founder of the village, and the name of the village came from here.

The whole village is a Potak. Although the pomak language is actively used, 3% of the young population knows this language very well by the elderly.

Every year, the 2nd week of May in the village is given a rain prayer for the rainy and fertile period of that year. The most important meal of the village is Escape made from corn flour.

It is 71 km from Edirne province and 14 km from Meric district.

The population of the village began in 1970 and after 1985, especially after the migration to the big cities, especially in Istanbul. In 1985, the population of the village, which was 750, had then fallen to 140 people. Due to the young population migrating, the average age of the people living in the village was 60 years old. The village had a population of 112 in 2022.
