= Çamlıca, Keşan =

Village in Turkey

Çamlıca
- Village
- Location within Turkey Location within Marmara
- Coordinates: 40.7619°N 26.6741°E
- Country: Turkey
- Province: Edirne
- District: Keşan
- Population (2022): 663
- Time zone: UTC+3 (TRT)

Çamlıca is a village in the Keşan District of Edirne Province in Turkey. Its population is 663 (2022). Before the 2013 reorganisation, it was a town (belde).
