= Hacı, İpsala =

Village in Turkey

Hacı
- Village
- Location within Turkey Location within Marmara
- Coordinates: 40°58′49″N 26°33′3″E
- Country: Turkey
- Province: Edirne
- District: İpsala
- Population (2022): 1,034
- Time zone: UTC+3 (TRT)

Hacı is a village in the İpsala District of Edirne Province in Turkey. The village had a population of 1,034 in 2022. Before the 2013 reorganisation, it was a town (belde).
