= Esetçe =

- Municipality
- Location in Turkey Esetçe (Marmara)
- Coordinates: 40°52′N 26°26′E
- Country: Turkey
- Province: Edirne
- District: İpsala
- Elevation: 80 m (260 ft)
- Population (2022): 2,155
- Time zone: UTC+3 (TRT)
- Postal code: 22490
- Area code: 0284

Esetçe is a town (belde) in the İpsala District, Edirne Province, Turkey. Its population is 2,155 (2022). Esetçe is 10 kilometres (6.2 mi) east of the border with Greece. Distance to İpsala is 11 kilometres (6.8 mi) and to Edirne is 135 kilometres (84 mi). Esetçe was founded after the Russo-Turkish War (1877-1878) by Turks and Pomaks from Plevna (presently in Bulgaria) who escaped from the Russians.
