= Yenimuhacir =

Yenimuhacir Bulgarköy
- Municipality
- Location in Turkey Yenimuhacir (Marmara)
- Coordinates: 40°51′N 26°41′E
- Country: Turkey
- Province: Edirne
- District: Keşan
- Elevation: 121 m (397 ft)
- Population (2022): 1,976
- Time zone: UTC+3 (TRT)
- Postal code: 22920
- Area code: 0284

Yenimuhacir is a town (belde) in the Keşan District, Edirne Province, Turkey. Its population is 1,976 (2022). It is situated in the Eastern Thrace plains. Its distance to Keşan is 7 kilometres (4.3 mi) and to Edirne is 117 kilometres (73 mi).

== History ==
The old name of this village was Bulgarköy ("Bulgarian village"). It was a Bulgarian settlement during the Ottoman era. During the destruction of the local Bulgarians on July 7, 1913, the Ottoman Army surrounded Bulgarköy and proceeded to massacre between 450 and 1100 inhabitants (depending on source), including women and children, burning the village to the ground in the process.
