= Mercan, Keşan =

Village in Turkey

Mercan
- Village
- Location within Turkey Location within Marmara
- Country: Turkey
- Province: Edirne
- District: Keşan
- Population (2022): 104
- Time zone: UTC+3 (TRT)

Mercan is a village in the Keşan District of Edirne Province in Turkey. Its population is 104 (2022).
