= Barağı, Keşan =

Village in Turkey

Barağı
- Village
- Location within Turkey Location within Marmara
- Coordinates: 40.7080°N 26.4301°E
- Country: Turkey
- Province: Edirne
- District: Keşan
- Population (2022): 113
- Time zone: UTC+3 (TRT)

Barağı is a village in the Keşan District of Edirne Province in Turkey. Its population is 113 (2022).
