= Boztepe, Keşan =

Village in Turkey

Boztepe
- Village
- Location within Turkey Location within Marmara
- Coordinates: 40.8421°N 26.5217°E
- Country: Turkey
- Province: Edirne
- District: Keşan
- Population (2022): 292
- Time zone: UTC+3 (TRT)

Boztepe is a village in the Keşan District of Edirne Province in Turkey. Its population is 292 (2022).
