= Yeniceçiftlik, Keşan =

Village in Turkey

Yeniceçiftlik
- Village
- Location within Turkey Location within Marmara
- Coordinates: 40°52′26″N 26°34′20″E
- Country: Turkey
- Province: Edirne
- District: Keşan
- Population (2022): 225
- Time zone: UTC+3 (TRT)

Yeniceçiftlik is a village in the Keşan District of Edirne Province in Turkey. Its population is 225 (2022).
