= Akçeşme, Keşan =

Village in Turkey

Akçeşme
- Village
- Location within Turkey Location within Marmara
- Coordinates: 40°50′58″N 26°29′27″E
- Country: Turkey
- Province: Edirne
- District: Keşan
- Population (2022): 117
- Time zone: UTC+3 (TRT)

Akçeşme is a village in the Keşan District of Edirne Province in Turkey. Its population is 117 (2022).
