= Sarıcaali, İpsala =

Village in Turkey

Sarıcaali
- Village
- Location within Turkey Location within Marmara
- Coordinates: 40°59′08″N 26°23′00″E
- Country: Turkey
- Province: Edirne
- District: İpsala
- Elevation: 31 m (102 ft)
- Population (2022): 589
- Time zone: UTC+3 (TRT)
- Postal code: 22490

Sarıcaali is a village in the İpsala District of Edirne Province in Turkey. The village had a population of 589 in 2022.
