= Yerlisu, Keşan =

Village in Turkey

Yerlisu
- Village
- Location within Turkey Location within Marmara
- Coordinates: 40°43′30″N 26°43′52″E
- Country: Turkey
- Province: Edirne
- District: Keşan
- Population (2022): 128
- Time zone: UTC+3 (TRT)

Yerlisu is a village in the Keşan District of Edirne Province in Turkey. Its population is 128 (2022).
