= Siğilli, Keşan =

Village in Turkey

Siğilli
- Village
- Location within Turkey Location within Marmara
- Coordinates: 40°49′N 26°36′E
- Country: Turkey
- Province: Edirne
- District: Keşan
- Population (2022): 814
- Time zone: UTC+3 (TRT)

Siğilli is a village in the Keşan District of Edirne Province in Turkey. Its population is 814 (2022).
