= Koruklu, Keşan =

Village in Turkey

Koruklu
- Village
- Location within Turkey Location within Marmara
- Country: Turkey
- Province: Edirne
- District: Keşan
- Population (2022): 102
- Time zone: UTC+3 (TRT)

Koruklu is a village in the Keşan District of Edirne Province in Turkey. Its population is 102 (2022).
