= Serem, Meriç =

Village in Turkey

Serem
- Village
- Location within Turkey Location within Marmara
- Coordinates: 41°19′N 26°31′E
- Country: Turkey
- Province: Edirne
- District: Meriç
- Population (2022): 263
- Time zone: UTC+3 (TRT)

Serem (also: Seren) is a village in the Meriç District of Edirne Province in Turkey. The village had a population of 263 in 2022.
