= Bahçeköy, Keşan =

Village in Turkey

Bahçeköy
- Village
- Location within Turkey Location within Marmara
- Coordinates: 40.7850°N 26.6773°E
- Country: Turkey
- Province: Edirne
- District: Keşan
- Population (2022): 479
- Time zone: UTC+3 (TRT)

Bahçeköy is a village in the Keşan District of Edirne Province in Turkey. Its population is 479 (2022).
