= Alibey, Meriç =

Village in Turkey

Alibey
- Village
- Location within Turkey Location within Marmara
- Coordinates: 41.2439°N 26.3558°E
- Country: Turkey
- Province: Edirne
- District: Meriç
- Population (2022): 198
- Time zone: UTC+3 (TRT)

Alibey is a village in the Meriç District of Edirne Province in Turkey. The village had a population of 198 in 2022.
