= Karasatı, Keşan =

Village in Turkey

Karasatı
- Village
- Location within Turkey Location within Marmara
- Coordinates: 40°58′N 26°42′E
- Country: Turkey
- Province: Edirne
- District: Keşan
- Population (2022): 113
- Time zone: UTC+3 (TRT)

Karasatı is a village in the Keşan District of Edirne Province in Turkey. Its population is 113 (2022).
