= Paşaköy, İpsala =

Village in Turkey

Paşaköy
- Village
- Location within Turkey Location within Marmara
- Coordinates: 40.849167°N 26.318611°E
- Country: Turkey
- Province: Edirne
- District: İpsala
- Population (2022): 925
- Time zone: UTC+3 (TRT)

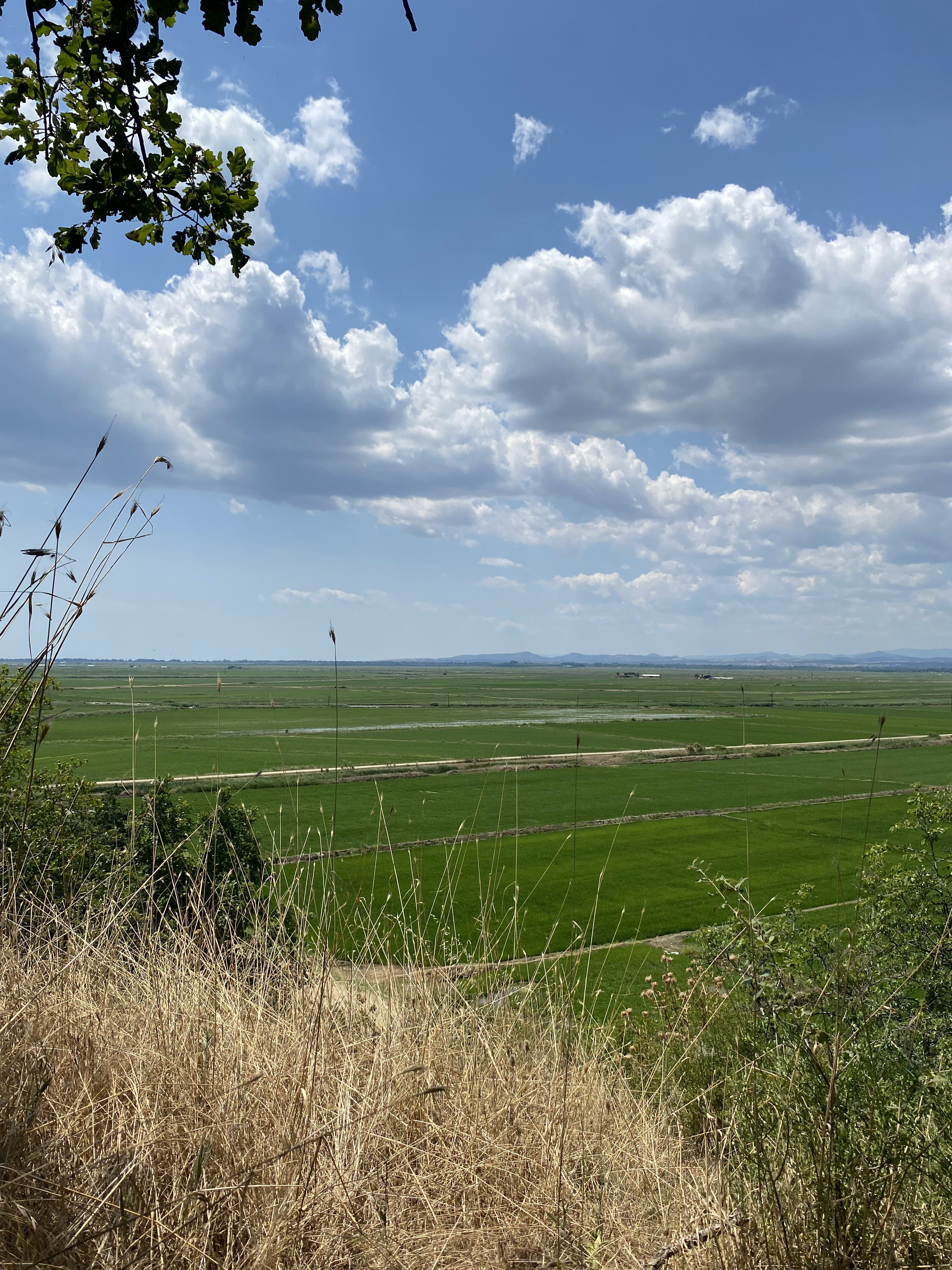

Paşaköy is a village in the İpsala District of Edirne Province in Turkey. The village had a population of 925 in 2022.
