= Küpdere, Meriç =

Village in Turkey

Küpdere
- Village
- Location within Turkey Location within Marmara
- Coordinates: 41°13′25″N 26°28′0″E
- Country: Turkey
- Province: Edirne
- District: Meriç
- Population (2022): 115
- Time zone: UTC+3 (TRT)

Küpdere is a village in the Meriç District of Edirne Province in Turkey. The village has a population of 115 as of 2022.
