= Pırnar, Keşan =

Village in Turkey

Pırnar
- Village
- Location within Turkey Location within Marmara
- Coordinates: 40°42′N 26°38′E
- Country: Turkey
- Province: Edirne
- District: Keşan
- Population (2022): 345
- Time zone: UTC+3 (TRT)

Pırnar is a village in the Keşan District of Edirne Province in Turkey. Its population is 345 (2022).
