= Büyükdoğanca, Keşan =

Village in Turkey

Büyükdoğanca
- Village
- Location within Turkey Location within Marmara
- Coordinates: 40°46′N 26°35′E
- Country: Turkey
- Province: Edirne
- District: Keşan
- Population (2022): 149
- Time zone: UTC+3 (TRT)

Büyükdoğanca is a village in the Keşan District of Edirne Province in Turkey. Its population is 149 (2022).
