= Erikli, Keşan =

Village in Turkey

Erikli
- Village
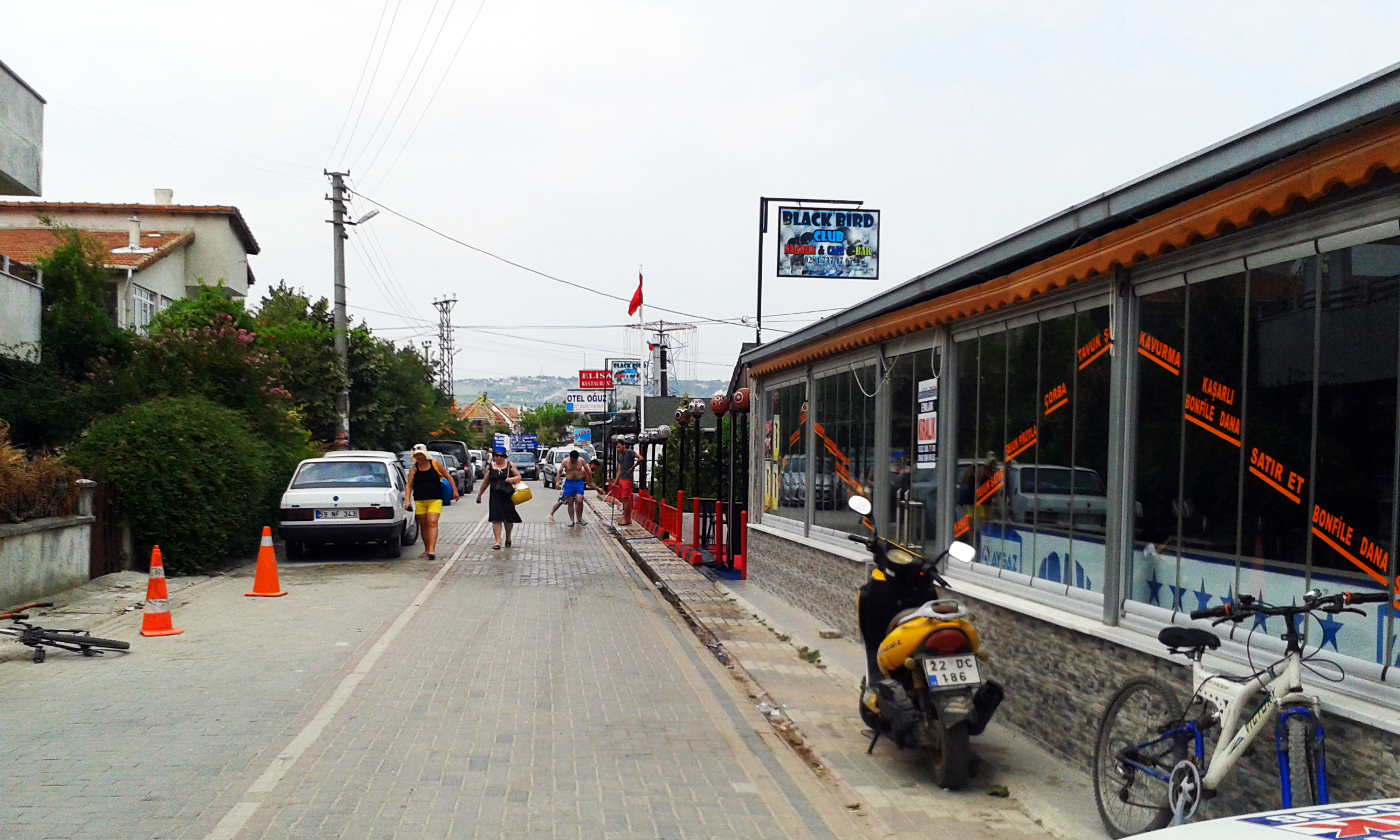

- Location within Turkey Location within Marmara
- Country: Turkey
- Province: Edirne
- District: Keşan
- Population (2022): 496
- Time zone: UTC+3 (TRT)

Erikli is a village in the Keşan District of Edirne Province in Turkey. Its population is 496 (2022).It is known for its stunning beach along the Saros Gulf in the Aegean Sea, which is renowned for its crystal-clear waters due to being one of the cleanest seas in the world.
