= Kadıdondurma, Meriç =

Village in Turkey

Kadıdondurma
- Village
- Location within Turkey Location within Marmara
- Coordinates: 41°10′N 26°21′E
- Country: Turkey
- Province: Edirne
- District: Meriç
- Population (2022): 623
- Time zone: UTC+3 (TRT)

Kadıdondurma is a village in the Meriç District of Edirne Province in Turkey. The village had a population of 623 in 2022.
