= Hıdırköy, İpsala =

Village in Turkey

Hıdırköy
- Village
- Location within Turkey Location within Marmara
- Coordinates: 40.914444°N 26.461389°E
- Country: Turkey
- Province: Edirne
- District: İpsala
- Population (2022): 191
- Time zone: UTC+3 (TRT)

Hıdırköy is a village in the İpsala District of Edirne Province in Turkey. The village had a population of 191 in 2022.
