= Balabancık, İpsala =

Village in Turkey

Balabancık
- Village
- Location within Turkey Location within Marmara
- Coordinates: 41.0337°N 26.4043°E
- Country: Turkey
- Province: Edirne
- District: İpsala
- Population (2022): 356
- Time zone: UTC+3 (TRT)

Balabancık is a village in the İpsala District of Edirne Province in Turkey. The village had a population of 356 in 2022.
