= Küplü =

- Municipality
- Location in Turkey Küplü (Marmara)
- Coordinates: 41°06′N 26°21′E
- Country: Turkey
- Province: Edirne
- District: Meriç
- Elevation: 21 m (69 ft)
- Population (2022): 2,153
- Time zone: UTC+3 (TRT)
- Postal code: 22610
- Area code: 0284

Küplü (Greek: Κιουπλιά) is a town (belde) in the Meriç District, Edirne Province, Turkey. The town had a population of 2,153 in 2022. Küplü is nearby the Greek border. The distance to Meriç is about 10 kilometres (6.2 mi). In the 19th century, Küplü was a Greek settlement, but according to the population exchange between Greece and Turkey agreement, most Greeks were replaced by Turks and Macedonians.
