= Kumdere, Tarsus =

Kumdere
- Neighbourhood
- Location in Turkey
- Coordinates: 37°05′N 34°59′E
- Country: Turkey
- Province: Mersin
- District: Tarsus
- Elevation: 184 m (604 ft)
- Population (2022): 180
- Time zone: UTC+3 (TRT)
- Area code: 0324

Kumdere is a neighbourhood in the Tarsus district of Mersin Province, Turkey. Its population is 180 (2022). It is situated in the southern slopes of the Toros Mountains, to the west of Turkish state highway D.400. Its distance to Tarsus is 32 kilometres (20 mi) and its distance to Mersin is 55 kilometres (34 mi).
