= Küçükdoğanca, İpsala =

Village in Turkey

Küçükdoğanca
- Village
- Location within Turkey Location within Marmara
- Country: Turkey
- Province: Edirne
- District: İpsala
- Population (2022): 100
- Time zone: UTC+3 (TRT)

Küçükdoğanca is a village in the İpsala District of Edirne Province in Turkey. The village had a population of 100 in 2022.
