= Yenikarpuzlu =

- Municipality
- Location in Turkey Yenikarpuzlu (Marmara)
- Coordinates: 40°50′N 26°18′E
- Country: Turkey
- Province: Edirne
- District: İpsala
- Elevation: 5 m (16 ft)
- Population (2022): 2,984
- Time zone: UTC+3 (TRT)
- Postal code: 22420
- Area code: 0284

Yenikarpuzlu (former Müsellim Cedit) is a town (belde) in the İpsala District, Edirne Province, Turkey. Its population is 2,984 (2022).

== Geography ==
Yenikarpuzlu is 12 kilometres (7.5 mi) from İpsala and 132 kilometres (82 mi) from Edirne. It lies on the coast of small Sığırcı Lake and about 25 kilometres (16 mi) north of Aegean Sea coast.

== History ==
The village Müsellim Cedit was founded in 1877 by Pomak people. After the first World War, they didn't allowed the Greek Army to enter city. In the new republic (Turkey) it was renamed Karpuzlu and later Yenikarpuzlu. In 1975 the village was declared a township.

== Economy ==
The town is on a very low altitude plain covered with marsh areas. The main economic activity is irrigated farming and the main crop is rice. Fresh water fishing is a secondary activity.
