= LNG spill =

Liquefied natural gas spillage

A liquefied natural gas (LNG) spill can happen during an accident or an intentional act. LNG is normally stored and transported in liquid form at a temperature of approximately −162 °C (−260 °F). If this cooled liquid is released from a storage facility, pipeline, or LNG transport ship, then it begins to warm. As LNG warms above its storage temperature, the liquid begins to vaporize. The resulting gas produced by this warming is typically methane, which is the major component (with some ethane) of natural gas and one of the most potent and hazardous greenhouse gases.

When an LNG spill or leak occurs, it enters the atmosphere and rapidly changes from a liquid to a gas state. This Rapid Phase Transition (RPT) significantly increases the volume of the LNG, which can heighten the pressure of and cause damage to the surrounding environment.

If a spill occurs and the vapor does not ignite, it would build to higher concentrations. At higher concentrations, the vaporized methane will cause an asphyxiation hazard to anyone exposed. If a spill or leak followed by a vaporization event were to occur in or near water, then water in contact with the spilled LNG can accelerate the vaporization process and increase the concentration of vapor in the immediate area, due to water's large latent heat. According to the 2004 Sandia report, this is of special concern to ship and pilot-boat crews, emergency response personnel or others who are exposed in a marine environment.

An ignition source close to the origin of the spill is likely to cause ignition and result in rapid burn off of natural gas vapors, rather than an explosion. No cargo explosions had been reported by 2002. In 2026, an LNG carrier with 62,000 tons of LNG fuel burned fully in the Mediterranean Sea.
