= Tevfikiye, İpsala =

Village in Turkey

Tevfikiye
- Village
- Location within Turkey Location within Marmara
- Coordinates: 41°3′48″N 26°29′34″E
- Country: Turkey
- Province: Edirne
- District: İpsala
- Population (2022): 170
- Time zone: UTC+3 (TRT)

Tevfikiye is a village in the İpsala District of Edirne Province in Turkey. The village had a population of 170 in 2022.
