= Keşan District =

District of Edirne Province, Turkey

- District
- Map showing Keşan District in Edirne Province

- Location in Turkey Keşan District (Marmara)
- Coordinates: 40°51′N 26°38′E
- Country: Turkey
- Province: Edirne
- Seat: Keşan

Government
  - Kaymakam: Cemalettin Yılmaz
- Area: 1,098 km^{2} (424 sq mi)
- Population (2022): 83,874
  - Density: 76/km^{2} (200/sq mi)
- Time zone: UTC+3 (TRT)
- Website: www.kesan.gov.tr

Keşan District is a district of the Edirne Province of Turkey. Its seat is the town of Keşan. Its area is 1,098 km^{2}, and its population is 83,874 (2022). Keşan district is bordered by İpsala and Uzunköprü to the north, Malkara to the east, Şarköy to the southeast, Gelibolu and the Aegean Sea to the south and Enez to the west.

== Composition ==
There are three municipalities in Keşan District:

- Beğendik
- Keşan
- Yenimuhacir

There are 45 villages in Keşan District:

- Akçeşme
- Akhoca
- Altıntaş
- Bahçeköy
- Barağı
- Beyköy
- Boztepe
- Büyükdoğanca
- Çamlıca
- Çelebi
- Çeltik
- Çobançeşmesi
- Danişment
- Dişbudak
- Erikli
- Gökçetepe
- Gündüzler
- Kadıköy
- Karacaali
- Karahisar
- Karasatı
- Karlı
- Kılıçköy
- Kızkapan
- Koruklu
- Kozköy
- Küçükdoğanca
- Lalacık
- Mahmutköy
- Maltepe
- Mecidiye
- Mercan
- Orhaniye
- Pırnar
- Şabanmera
- Sazlıdere
- Seydiköy
- Siğilli
- Şükrüköy
- Suluca
- Türkmen
- Yaylaköy
- Yeniceçiftlik
- Yerlisu
- Yeşilköy
