= Korucu, İpsala =

Village in Turkey

Korucu
- Village
- Location within Turkey Location within Marmara
- Country: Turkey
- Province: Edirne
- District: İpsala
- Population (2022): 370
- Time zone: UTC+3 (TRT)

Korucu is a village in the İpsala District of Edirne Province in Turkey. The village had a population of 370 in 2022.
