= Yakupbey, Meriç =

Village in Turkey

Yakupbey
- Village
- Location within Turkey Location within Marmara
- Coordinates: 41°14′N 26°33′E
- Country: Turkey
- Province: Edirne
- District: Meriç
- Population (2022): 121
- Time zone: UTC+3 (TRT)

Yakupbey is a village in the Meriç District of Edirne Province in Turkey. The village had a population of 121 in 2022.
