= Meriç, Edirne =

Meriç
- Municipality
- Location within Turkey Location within Marmara
- Coordinates: 41°11′21″N 26°25′05″E
- Country: Turkey
- Province: Edirne
- District: Meriç

Government
  - Mayor: Yunus Atay (AKP)
- Elevation: 30 m (98 ft)
- Population (2022): 2,820
- Time zone: UTC+3 (TRT)
- Postal code: 22680
- Area code: 0284
- Website: www.meric.bel.tr

Meriç is a town in Edirne Province, Turkey. It is the seat of Meriç District. Its population is 2,820 (2022). The mayor is Yunus Atay (AKP).

== History ==
The land was conquered by the Ottomans in 1361. Until the Balkan Wars in 1912, a part of the district was part of Soufli (back then still part of the Ottoman Empire), with the other part being connected to the neighbouring district Uzunköprü. After Soufli was lost to Greece in 1913, a new district was formed with the name Kavaklı. From 1920 to 1922, the area was annexed by Greece. Until 1930, the name stayed the same. In 1930, the district got its current name Meriç.

== Name ==
- Kavaklı (1913-1930)
- Meriç (1930-present)

The name Meriç comes from the river of Meriç, a river forming the border between present day Turkey and Greece.
