= Sazlıdere, Keşan =

Village in Turkey

Sazlıdere
- Village
- Location within Turkey Location within Marmara
- Coordinates: 40.65779°N 26.68217°E
- Country: Turkey
- Province: Edirne
- District: Keşan
- Population (2022): 239
- Time zone: UTC+3 (TRT)

Sazlıdere is a village in the Keşan District of Edirne Province in Turkey. Its population is 239 (2022).
