= Subaşı, Edirne =

Subaşı
- Municipality
- Location in Turkey Subaşı (Marmara)
- Coordinates: 41°09′N 26°23′E
- Country: Turkey
- Province: Edirne
- District: Meriç
- Elevation: 21 m (69 ft)
- Population (2022): 1,865
- Time zone: UTC+3 (TRT)
- Postal code: 22670
- Area code: 0284

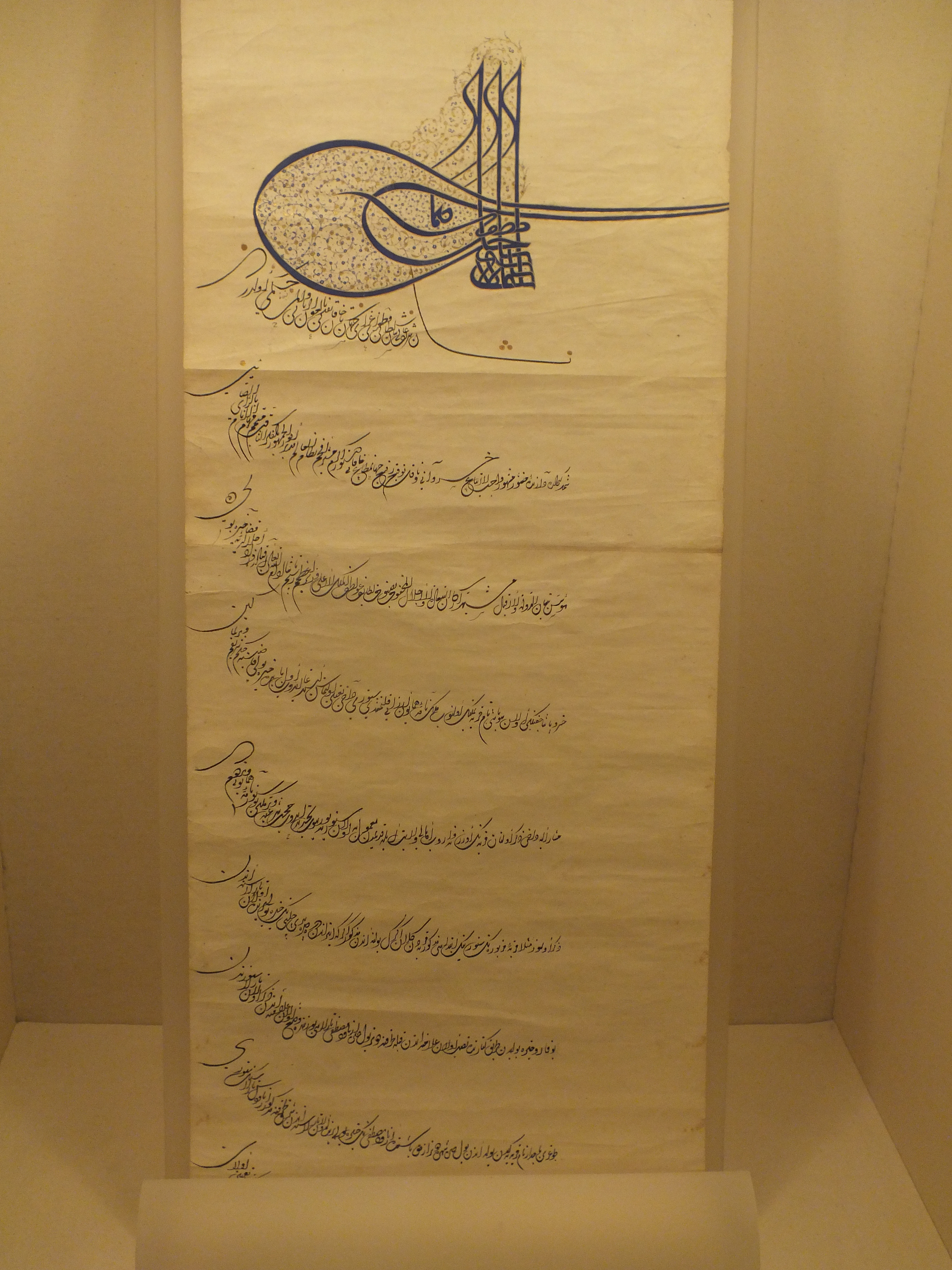
Sinirname issued by Sultan Suleyman the Magnificent, that describes the village of Subasi as mülk (freehold land) of Rustem Pasha.

Subaşı is a town (belde) in the Meriç District, Edirne Province, Turkey. Its population is 1,865 (2022). Subaşı is situated 6 kilometres (3.7 mi) from the Greek border. The distance to Meriç is 7 kilometres (4.3 mi) and to Edirne is 90 kilometres (56 mi). The settlement was founded in the 19th century by Pomak refugees following the Russo-Turkish War (1877-1878). Later some Yörüks (Turkmens) also settled in Subaşı. In 1992, Subaşı was declared a seat of township. Main economic activity of Subaşı is agriculture. Rice, wheat, corn, bean and sunflower are the main crops.
