= Kumdere, İpsala =

Village in Turkey

Kumdere
- Village
- Location within Turkey Location within Marmara
- Coordinates: 40.866667°N 26.366667°E
- Country: Turkey
- Province: Edirne
- District: İpsala
- Population (2022): 841
- Time zone: UTC+3 (TRT)

Kumdere is a village in the İpsala District of Edirne Province in Turkey. The village had a population of 841 in 2022.
