= Gökçetepe, Keşan =

Village in Turkey

Gökçetepe
- Village
- Location within Turkey Location within Marmara
- Coordinates: 40.6630°N 26.6317°E
- Country: Turkey
- Province: Edirne
- District: Keşan
- Population (2022): 455
- Time zone: UTC+3 (TRT)

Gökçetepe is a village in the Keşan District of Edirne Province in Turkey. Its population is 455 (2022).
