= İpsala District =

District of Edirne Province, Turkey

- District
- Map showing İpsala District in Edirne Province

- Location in Turkey İpsala District (Marmara)
- Coordinates: 40°55′N 26°23′E
- Country: Turkey
- Province: Edirne
- Seat: İpsala

Government
  - Kaymakam: Ömer Sevgili
- Area: 741 km^{2} (286 sq mi)
- Population (2022): 26,148
  - Density: 35/km^{2} (91/sq mi)
- Time zone: UTC+3 (TRT)
- Website: www.ipsala.gov.tr

İpsala District is a district of the Edirne Province of Turkey. Its seat is the town of İpsala. Its area is 741 km^{2}, and its population is 26,148 (2022).

== Composition ==
There are three municipalities in İpsala District:

- Esetçe
- İpsala
- Yenikarpuzlu

There are 19 villages in İpsala District:

- Aliçopehlivan
- Balabancık
- Hacı
- Hıdırköy
- İbriktepe
- Karaağaç
- Kocahıdır
- Korucu
- Koyuntepe
- Kumdere
- Küçükdoğanca
- Paşaköy
- Pazardere
- Sarıcaali
- Sarpdere
- Sultan
- Tevfikiye
- Turpçular
- Yapıldak
