= Keşan =

- Municipality
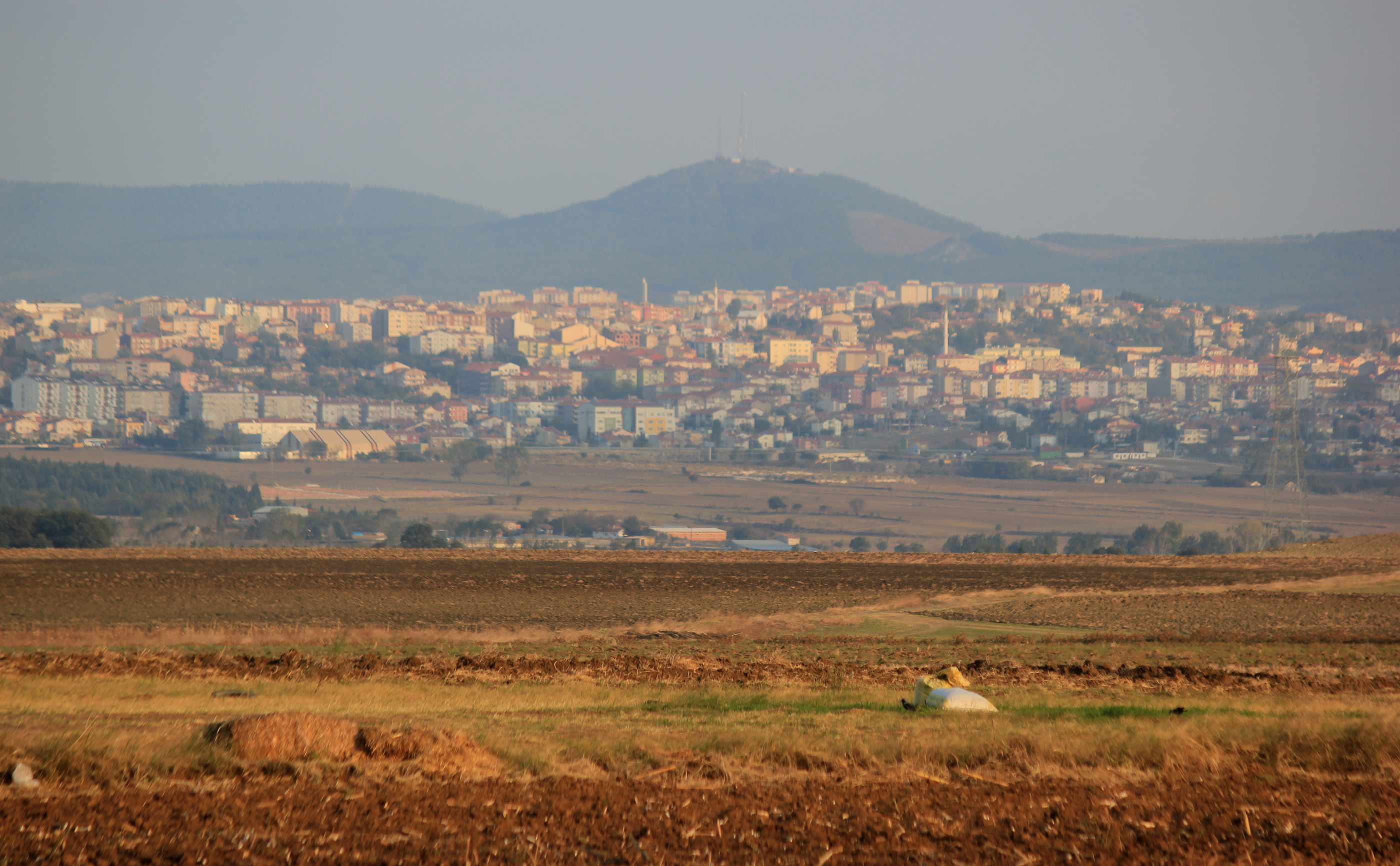
- General view of Keşan

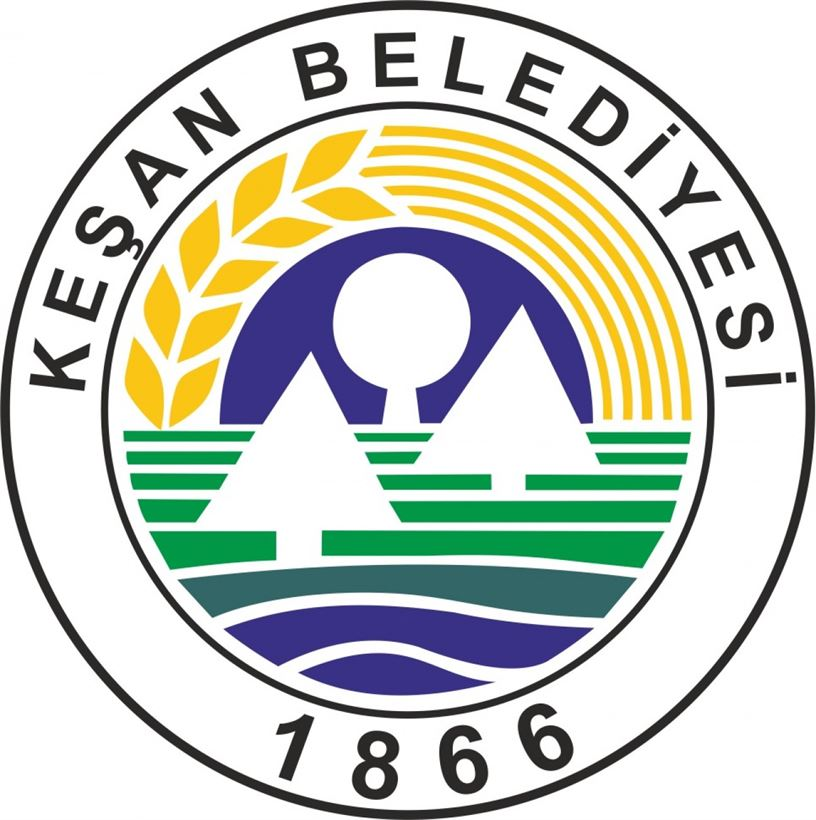
- Logo

- Location within Turkey Location within Marmara
- Coordinates: 40°51′10″N 26°38′00″E
- Country: Turkey
- Province: Edirne
- District: Keşan

Government
  - Mayor: Mehmet Özcan (AKP)
- Population (2022): 64,842
- Time zone: UTC+3 (TRT)
- Area code: 0284
- Website: www.kesan.bel.tr

Keşan (Turkish: [ˈceʃan]; Bulgarian: Кешан; Greek: Κεσσάνη; Byzantine Greek: Ρούσιον, Rusion) is a town in Edirne Province, Turkey. It is the seat of Keşan District. Its population is 64,842 (2022). In the summer its population increases because of an influx of tourists. The mayor is Mehmet Özcan (CHP).

Agriculture and commerce are the two most important sources of income in Keşan. Because of its proximity to Greece, there is a daily flow of tourists in and out of the district. The local music includes gaida, tupan, and hora dance.

== History ==
Humans have lived there continuously since the 30th century BC. The first inhabitants were the Neolithic peoples and later the Thracians. Many Thracian coins of the Odrysians have been found near Keşan. The city was first attested in 580 BC as part of the Odrysian kingdom of Thrace and then came under the rule of the Persian Empire, the Macedonian Empire, the Roman Empire (including i.е. Byzantine Empire), the Bulgarian Empire, the Byzantine Empire, the Latin Empire, again the Bulgarian Empire and the Byzantine Empire. The town lay on the Via Egnatia and was thus mentioned by the geographer Claudius Ptolemy and many others. Throughout its history, the town was referred to as: Zorlanis (and Zerlanis, Zorlanae, Zorlanea), Topiris (and Topir, Topiro, Topirion), Kission (and Kissos, Kissan, Kissupolis), Rusion (and Russa, Roussa, Rossion). It was raided by the Kutrigurs in 538 and again in 559 under the leadership of Khan Zabergan. Bulgars and Slavs captured it in 617, 623 and 626, Tervel of Bulgaria in 705 and 717-718, Khan Krum in 813, Tzar Simeon the Great in 896, 913, 921, 922 and 923, Bulgarian rebels in 1040, Tzar Ivan Asen II in 1235–1236, Tzar Michail Shishman in 1328. Here is also the place of the remarkable Battle of Rusion, where Kaloyan of Bulgaria defeated the army of the Latin Empire in 1206. The castle of Rusion is situated on the hill about 4 km southwest of the city center of Keşan and some ruins still exist around (coordinates: 40.826272N 26.679587E) the so-called "Kaletepe" (tur.- Fortress hill).

Rusion did not easily fall to the Ottoman Turks. In 1359, the fortress was first held for a short time by Gazi Süleyman Paşa before being permanently annexed by Lala Şahin Paşa in 1362. Under the Ottoman Empire, Rusion was renamed to Rusköy (tur. Rus village), a name derived from the medieval fortress-town, and later to Keşan (from gr. Kissos, Kissupolis). Keşan belonged to the Galipoli Sanjak, and as such was part of the Rumelia Eyalet and then the Province of the Kapudan Pasha. It was a nahiya center in Enez kaza at first, later it was bound to İpsala kaza. It was transferred to the Eyalet of Edirne in 1530. According to the Ottoman population statistics of 1914, the kaza of Keşan had a total population of 30,644, consisting of 15.371 Orthodox Christians, 15.221 Muslims, 51 Armenians and 1 Jew.

Keşan was invaded by the Russians in 1829 and in 1878, by the Bulgarians between 1912 and 1913 (on 14 November 1912, the Bulgarian Hayrabol detachment, commanded by colonel Petar Salabashev, took the town and Tzar Ferdinand resided there for a few days), by the Greeks between 30 of July 1920 and 1922. It was ceded to Republic of Turkey on 19 November 1922. Keşan district reached its present borders after the separation of nahiya of Enez in 1953. A large part of the population are Bulgarian speaking Muslims, immigrants from Bulgaria and Greece, Roma, and Turkmens.

== Geography ==
Keşan lies in the southern part of Edirne Province, at the intersection of the State roads D.550 (Edirne–Gelibolu) and D.110 (İpsala–Istanbul). The town consists of 11 quarters: Mustafa Kemal Paşa, Yenimahalle, İspatcami, Cumhuriyet, İstasyon, Yenimescit, Aşağızaferiye, Yukarızaferiye, Büyükcami, Paşayiğit and İzzetiye.

== Notable people ==
- Selim Sesler (1957–2014), clarinet virtuoso of Romani heritage
- Aleko Trendafilov - volunteer in Thessaloniki detachment of the Bulgarian Macedonian-Adrianopolitan Volunteer Corps, born and resident of Keşan
- Kosta Yanev - volunteer in 3rd company of the 10th Prilep battalion of Bulgarian Macedonian-Adrianopolitan Volunteer Corps, born and resident of Keşan
