= İpsala =

- Municipality
- Location in Turkey İpsala (Marmara)
- Coordinates: 40°55′18″N 26°22′55″E
- Country: Turkey
- Province: Edirne
- District: İpsala

Government
  - Mayor: Mehmet Kerman (AKP)
- Elevation: 17 m (56 ft)
- Population (2022): 8,546
- Time zone: UTC+3 (TRT)
- Postal code: 22400
- Area code: 0284
- Website: www.ipsala.bel.tr

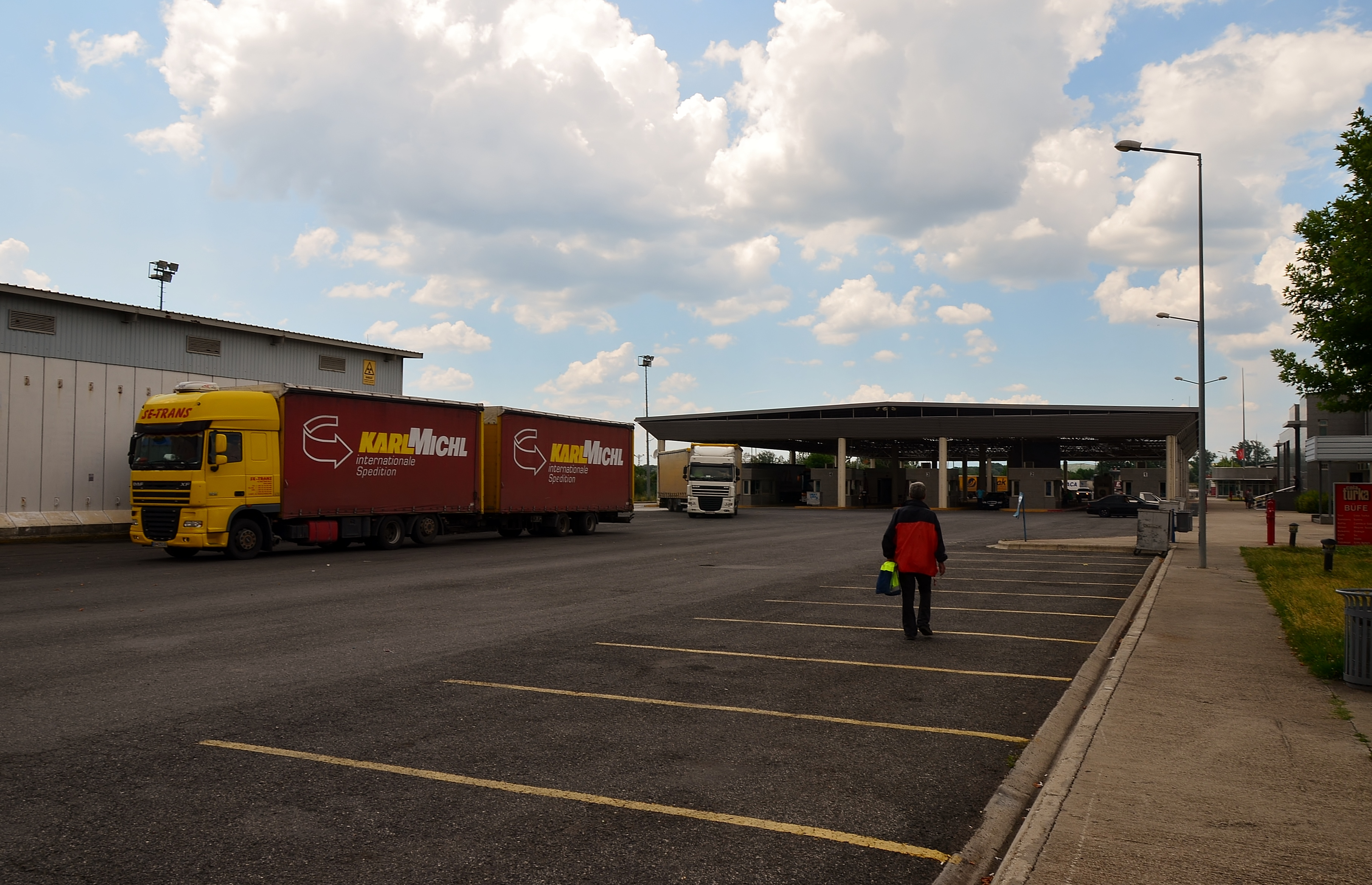
Checkpoint İpsala at the Greece–Turkey border crossing.

İpsala (Ancient Greek: Κύψελα, romanized: Kýpsela; Greek: Ύψαλα, romanized: Ýpsala) is a town in Edirne Province in northwestern Turkey. It is the seat of İpsala District. Its population is 8,546 (2022). It is the location of one of the main border checkpoints between Greece and Turkey. The Greek town opposite İpsala is Kipoi.

The state road D.110 (European route E90) connects the border checkpoint İpsala with Tekirdağ at the coast of the Marmara Sea. The town consists of six quarters: Kapucu, Saraçilyas, Bayrambey, Köprü, Bozkurt and Fatih.

== History ==
In Hellenistic, Roman and Byzantine times, this was the town of Cypsela, which belonged to the Roman province of Rhodope, whose capital and metropolitan see was Traianopolis. During the reign of Orhan, it came under the rule of the Ottoman Empire.

From the 7th century onward, the bishopric of Cypsela, initially a suffragan of Traianopolis, appears in the Notitiae Episcopatuum as an autocephalous archdiocese. Its bishops Georgius and Theophylactus were present respectively at the Second Council of Constantinople (553) and the Second Council of Nicaea (787). Stephanus was at both the Council of Constantinople (869) and the Council of Constantinople (879). No longer a residential bishopric, Cypsela is today listed by the Catholic Church as a titular see.

== Climate ==
İpsala has a hot-summer Mediterranean climate (Köppen: Csa), with hot, dry summers, and somewhat cold, moderately wet winters.

Climate data for İpsala (1991–2020)
Month	Jan	Feb	Mar	Apr	May	Jun	Jul	Aug	Sep	Oct	Nov	Dec	Year
Mean daily maximum °C (°F)	7.9 (46.2)	10.0 (50.0)	13.4 (56.1)	18.6 (65.5)	24.5 (76.1)	29.5 (85.1)	32.1 (89.8)	32.3 (90.1)	27.4 (81.3)	20.9 (69.6)	14.9 (58.8)	9.4 (48.9)	20.1 (68.2)
Daily mean °C (°F)	4.0 (39.2)	5.6 (42.1)	8.5 (47.3)	12.9 (55.2)	18.1 (64.6)	22.8 (73.0)	25.0 (77.0)	25.0 (77.0)	20.5 (68.9)	15.1 (59.2)	10.2 (50.4)	5.6 (42.1)	14.5 (58.1)
Mean daily minimum °C (°F)	0.8 (33.4)	1.9 (35.4)	4.4 (39.9)	7.9 (46.2)	12.5 (54.5)	16.7 (62.1)	18.6 (65.5)	18.5 (65.3)	14.6 (58.3)	10.5 (50.9)	6.4 (43.5)	2.4 (36.3)	9.6 (49.3)
Average precipitation mm (inches)	68.47 (2.70)	63.17 (2.49)	66.83 (2.63)	43.61 (1.72)	43.11 (1.70)	37.57 (1.48)	21.78 (0.86)	11.04 (0.43)	33.49 (1.32)	74.16 (2.92)	81.5 (3.21)	84.97 (3.35)	629.7 (24.79)
Average precipitation days (≥ 1.0 mm)	7.3	5.9	6.9	5.8	5.2	4.7	2.7	2.2	3.4	5.2	6.1	7.3	62.7
Average relative humidity (%)	81.3	77.9	75.9	72.0	68.7	64.5	60.4	60.3	66.2	74.9	79.5	81.4	71.8
Source: NOAA
