= Sıla discography =

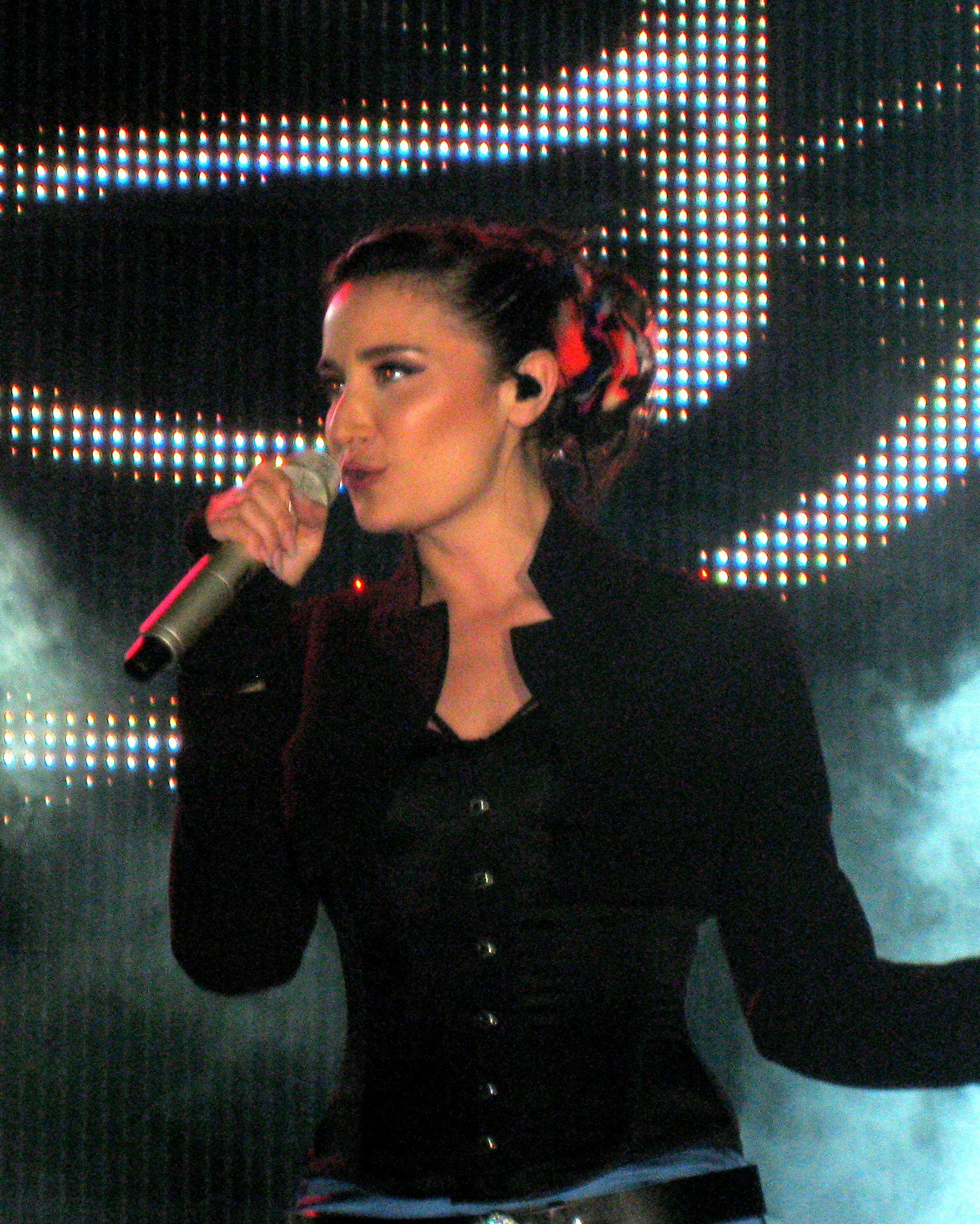
- Sıla in 2011
- Studio albums: 7
- Compilation albums: 2
- Singles: 3
- Music videos: 32

Turkish singer Sıla's discography consists of seven studio albums, two compilation albums, three promo singles and 32 music videos. She started her career by working as a backing vocalist for Kenan Doğulu, and in the late 2007, she released her first studio album Sıla. With its lead single, "...Dan Sonra", which topped Turkey's music charts, she became a well-known singer in Turkey. After a year, she collaborated with the Colombian group Ciclon on their album Shaker and a music video was made for one of its songs "Yaz Geliyor Heyoo".

In March 2009, Sıla released her second studio album İmza. The song "Sevişmeden Uyumayalım" from this album ranked number-one on Turkey's national music charts; "İnşallah", "Yara Bende" and "Bana Biraz Renk Ver" were also among the top five on the music charts in Turkey. In June 2010, she was featured on Ozan Doğulu's song "Alain Delon", which became a hit inside Turkey. By the end of the year, her third studio album, Konuşmadığımız Şeyler Var, was released, which included the number-one songs "Acısa da Öldürmez", "Kafa" and "Boş Yere". Konuşmadığımız Şeyler Var sold more than 100,000 copies in Turkey.

In June 2012, Sıla released a compilation album titled Joker. New versions of her songs from her previous albums were included in this compilation album. In October 2012, her fourth studio album, Vaveyla, was released, which sold more than 84,000 copies. Separate music videos were made for the songs "İmkânsız", "Zor Sevdiğimden" and "Aslan Gibi" from this album. In February 2014, her fifth studio album, Yeni Ay, was released and sold 158,041 copies inside Turkey. Four music videos were made for the songs "Vaziyetler", "Yabancı", "Reverans" and "Hediye". She released her sixth album in 2016, titled Mürekkep.

== Albums ==
=== Studio albums ===
List of albums and sales figures
Album	Album information	Sales
Sıla	Released: 23 October 2007; Label: Sony; Format: CD, digital download, LP	
İmza	Released: 24 March 2009; Label: Sony; Format: CD, digital download, LP	Turkey: 65,000
Konuşmadığımız Şeyler Var	Released: 24 November 2010; Label: Sony; Format: CD, digital download, LP	Turkey: 100,000
Vaveyla	Released: 9 October 2012; Label: Sony; Format: CD, digital download, LP	Turkey: 84,000
Yeni Ay	Released: 18 February 2014; Label: Sony; Format: CD, digital download, LP	Turkey: 158,041
Mürekkep	Released: 6 May 2016; Label: Sony; Format: CD, digital download, LP	Turkey: 101,726
Şarkıcı	Released: 20 May 2022; Label: Sony; Format: Digital download	Turkey:

=== Compilation albums ===
List of albums and sales figures
Album	Album information	Sales
Joker	Released: 1 June 2012; Label: Sony; Format: CD, DVD, Phonograph record, digital download	Turkey: 35,500
Acı Meşk Aslolan Heves	Released: 24 November 2020; Label: Sony; Format: CD, Phonograph record	Turkey:

=== EPs ===
List of albums
Album	Album info
Acı	Released: 1 March 2019; Label: Sony; Format: CD, digital download
Meşk	Released: 26 July 2019; Label: Sony; Format: CD, digital download
Ayna Yazısı (Akustik)	Released: 13 December 2024; Label: Karış; Format: Digital download

=== Split albums ===
List of albums
Album	Album info
Shaker (with Ciclon)	Released: 15 May 2008; Label: Sony; Format: CD, digital download

== Charts ==
Position of songs on different lists, year of publication and albums's names
Song	Year	Peak (TR)	Album
"...Dan Sonra" (duet with Kenan Doğulu)	2007	1	Sıla
"Kenar Süsü"	2008	2	Sıla
"Yaz Geliyor Heyoo"	2008	34	Shaker
"Sevişmeden Uyumayalım"	2009	1	İmza
"İnşallah"	2009	2	İmza
"Yara Bende"	2009	4	İmza
"Bana Biraz Renk Ver"	2010	3	İmza
"Alain Delon" (with Ozan Doğulu)	2010	1	130 Bpm
"Acısa da Öldürmez"	2010	1	Konuşmadığımız Şeyler Var
"Oluruna Bırak"	2011	2	Konuşmadığımız Şeyler Var
"Kafa"	2011	1	Konuşmadığımız Şeyler Var
"Boş Yere"	2011	1	Konuşmadığımız Şeyler Var
"Tam da Bugün"	2012	—	Konuşmadığımız Şeyler Var
"Yoruldum"	2012	2	Joker
"İmkânsız"	2012	2	Vaveyla
"Zor Sevdiğimden"	2012	2	Vaveyla
"Aslan Gibi"	2013	—	Vaveyla
"Vaziyetler"	2014	1	Yeni Ay
"Yabancı"	2014	1	Yeni Ay
"Reverans"	2014	2	Yeni Ay
"Hediye"	2015	1	Yeni Ay
"Afitap"	2016	—	Mürekkep
"Engerek"	2016	—	Mürekkep
"Yan Benimle"	2017	10	Mürekkep
"Muhbir"	2018	—	Non-album single
"Karanfil"	2019	3	Meşk
"İnandım"	2020	—	Non-album single
"Ver O Zaman Gömleklerimi" (with Yalın)	2021	—	Non-album single
"Rüyanda Görsen İnanma"	2021	—	Non-album single
"Şarkıcı"	2022	—	Şarkıcı
"Velhasıl"	2022	—	Şarkıcı
"Kalksın Uyuyanlar"	2022	—	Şarkıcı
"—" indicates that the songs were not included in the lists or the results were not disclosed.

== Other works ==
List of songs, year of publication and albums's names
Song	Year	Album
"Seni Görmeseydim" (with Serkan Çağrı)	2008	Şükrü Tunar Eserleriyle
"Alain Delon" (with Ozan Doğulu)	2010	130 Bpm
"Hadi Ordan" (with Gökhan Keser)	2011	Gökhan Keser
"Bazen" (with Gökhan Keser)	2011	Gökhan Keser
"Haşa" (with İskender Paydaş)	2014	Zamansız Şarkılar 2
"Canım Sıkılıyor Canım"	2014	Kayahan En İyileri No.1
"Ateşle Oynama" (with Erol Evgin)	2016	Altın Düetler
"Belalım"	2016	Livaneli 50. Yıl "Bir Kuşaktan Bir Kuşağa"
"Başka Şarkı" (with Rubato)	2017	İki
"Sen De Alıp Başını Gitme"	2018	Merhaba Gençler 2018
"Beni Hatırla"	2018	Ve Nazan Öncel Şarkıları
"Her Yaşın Bir Güzelliği Var"	2019	Fikret Şeneş Şarkıları
"Yaralım" (with Nükhet Duru)	2020	Hikayesi Var
"Zahmet Olmazsa" (with Emre Altuğ)	2020	Non-album single
"Fırtına"	2022	Yeni Türkü Zamansız
"Anonim Sevgili" (with Ceylan Ertem)	2022	Duyuyor Musun?
"Tükeneceğiz" (with Ceylan Ertem)	2022	Duyuyor Musun?
"Deli Kızın Türküsü"	2024	Bülent Özdemir Şarkıları

== Music videos ==
List of music videos, year of publication and director(s)
Video	Year	Director(s)
"...Dan Sonra"	2007	Murad Küçük
"Kenar Süsü"	2008	Murad Küçük
"Yaz Geliyor Heyoo"	2008	—N/a
"Sevişmeden Uyumayalım"	2009	Murad Küçük
"İnşallah"	2009	Fernando Vallejo
"Yara Bende"	2009	Kemal Doğulu
"Bana Biraz Renk Ver"	2010	Tamer Başaran
"Alain Delon"	2010	Murat Onbul
"Acısa da Öldürmez"	2010	Murat Onbul
"Oluruna Bırak"	2011	Kemal Doğulu
"Kafa"	2011	Tamer Başaran
"Boş Yere"	2011	Sıla Gençoğlu
"Tam da Bugün"	2012	Sıla Gençoğlu
"Yoruldum"	2012	Tamer Başaran
"İmkânsız"	2012	Efe Bahadır & Gözde Mutluer
"Zor Sevdiğimden"	2012	Gülşen Aybaba
"Aslan Gibi"	2013	Gülşen Aybaba
"Vaziyetler"	2014	Emre Akay
"Yabancı"	2014	Ergin Turunç
"Reverans"	2014	Ergin Turunç
"Hediye"	2015	Ergin Turunç
"Afitap"	2016	Bedran Güzel
"Engerek"	2016	Rahşan Gülşan
"Yan Benimle"	2017	Bedran Güzel
"Karanfil"	2019	Bedran Güzel
"Haytalar Dükkanı"	2019	Bedran Güzel
"Yaralım"	2020	Onur Sarsıcı
"İnandım"	2020	Bedran Güzel
"Ver O Zaman Gömleklerimi"	2021	—N/a
"Şarkıcı"	2022	Bedran Güzel
"Velhasıl"	2022	Bedran Güzel
"Kalksın Uyuyanlar"	2022	Bedran Güzel
"Arz"	2023	Kayhan Uruk
"Sek"	2023	Mikail Yılmaz
"Yağmur"	2024	R. Hakan Arslan
"Mesela"	2024	R. Hakan Arslan
"Hep Olsun Aşk"	2024	R. Hakan Arslan
"Sakatlık Bende"	2025	R. Hakan Arslan
"Rüyalar Güzeli"	2025	İsmail Ersan
"Leyla"	2025	R. Hakan Arslan
"Evvel Ezel"	2025	Aslı Çelikel
