= Yeni Ay =

Studio album by Sıla
- Released: 18 February 2014
- Recorded: 2013–2014
- Studio: Babajim Studios, Istanbul; Sierra Studios, Athens
- Genre: Pop
- Length: 1:13:47
- Label: Sony · Columbia
- Producer: Sıla Gençoğlu · Efe Bahadır

Sıla chronology
Vaveyla (2012)	Yeni Ay (2014)	Mürekkep (2016)

Yeni Ay (New Moon) is the fifth studio album by Turkish singer Sıla. It was released by Sony Music Entertainment and Columbia Records on 18 February 2014. After "using dark and introspective themes" in her fourth studio album Vaveyla (2012), Sıla started working on Yeni Ay "at a time of feeling well". She wrote all of the songs by herself and composed them together with Efe Bahadır. She also produced the album together with Bahadır. İskender Paydaş, Can Baydar, Bedük and Fatih Ahıskalı also worked on the album. The recording of the album began in late 2013 and continued until early 2014. The album was recorded in Istanbul at Babajim Studios and in Athens at Sierra Studios.

A pop album, Yeni Ay was released in two separate discs. The second disc has 11 songs in total: ten songs plus a remix of the song "Yabancı". The second disc features demos of the songs that appear on the first disc. The lyrics in the album are about "new beginnings, new hopes and new beauties", and that's what the album's title is based on. Many of the critics praised the album and Sıla's ability in songwriting. Four of the album's songs were turned into music videos, all of which ranked on top of Turkey's official music chart. The album's lead single "Vaziyetler" topped Türkçe Top 20 for eleven weeks. The second and fourth music videos were released for "Yabancı" and "Hediye" respectively, both of which ranked first on the chart. The third music video, "Reverans", rose to number two on the official chart.

Yeni Ay received the Best Album award at the 2014 Kral Turkey Music Awards. The album also earned Sıla the Best Female Artist award, and she was named the Artist with the Most Number of Songs Played on Radios. Yeni Ay sold 70,000 copies on its first week of released and ranked first on D&R's List of Best-Selling albums for weeks. By the end of 2014, it sold 158,000 copies in Turkey, becoming the best-selling album of the year in both digital and physical formats. To promote the album, Sıla gave concerts across Turkey and Europe.

== Background and recording ==
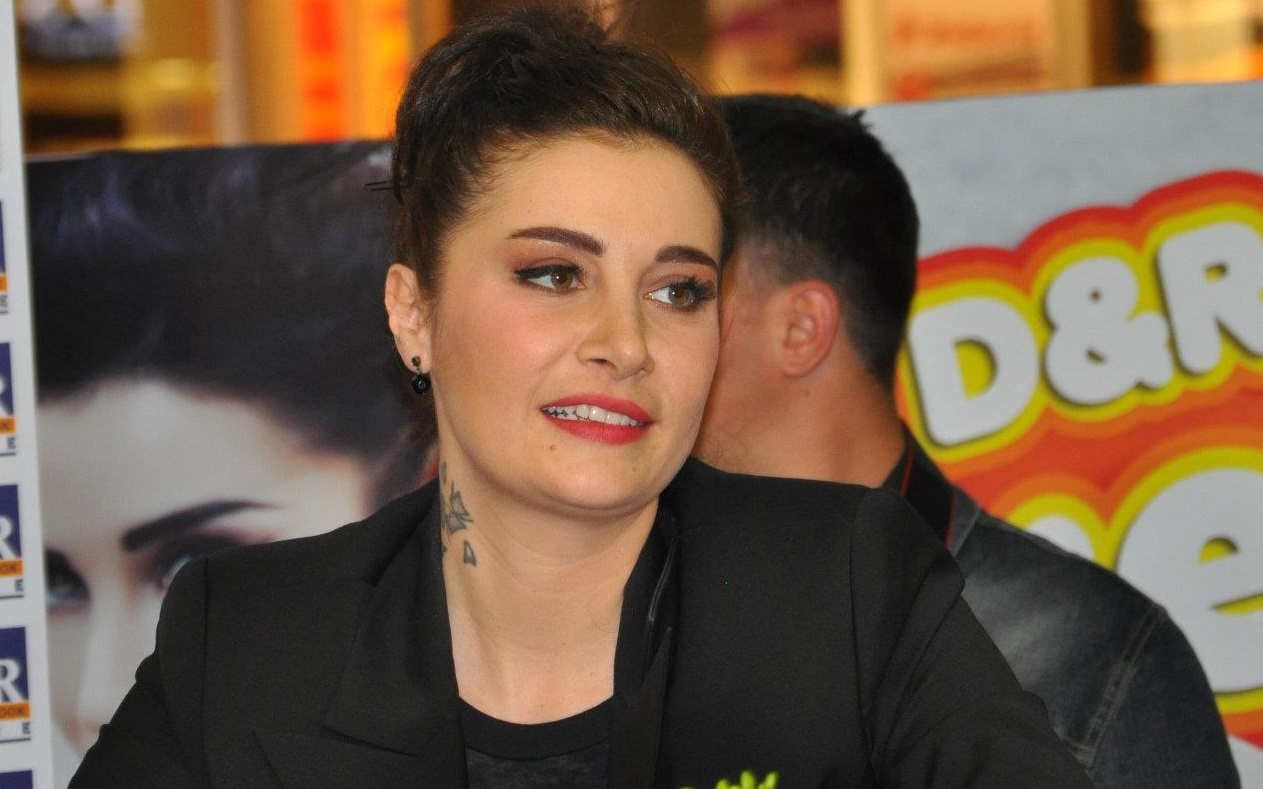
Sıla wrote all of the songs on her own, with the exception of "Doldur", and produced the album together with Efe Bahadır.

Sıla used "dark and introspective themes" for her previous album Vaveyla, which was released in October 2012. Three music videos were released for the songs "İmkânsız", "Zor Sevdiğimden" and "Aslan Gibi" from this album, and the first two of them ranked second on Türkçe Top 20. On 20 September 2013, at her concert in Cemil Topuzlu Open-Air Theatre, Sıla performed the song "Saki", which was written by herself and composed by Fatih Ahıskalı, for the first time. From this time, she continued to perform the song at a number of her concerts. In October, it was reported that she had started working on her fifth album and the recordings began in November. The recording continued until January 2014. In February, she appeared on a radio program to perform her new album's lead single "Vaziyetler", but instead she decided to sing a song about "Alp Er Tunga Saga" and surprised the audience. "Vaziyetler" was eventually broadcast on 11 February on radio programs and was also released on digital platforms. It was also made available for pre-ordering on iTunes Store.

Yeni Ay was released on 18 February by Sony Music Entertainment and Columbia Records. The song "Tamam mıyız?", which Sıla had prepared for Çağan Irmak's 2013 movie Tamam mıyız?, was also included in the album. The album was produced by Sıla and Efe Bahadır and contains two different discs, the second of which features the demos of the songs found in the first disc. Sıla wrote all of the album's songs on her own, with the exception of "Doldur", which she wrote together with Can Baydar. She described "Doldur" as "the album's most celebratory song" in an interview with Bugün's Fatih Vural. Sıla composed six of the songs together with Efe Bahadır. Bedük also made a remixed version of the album's first song "Yabancı". The recordings were done at Babajim Studios and Sierra Studios. Alp Turaç, Arzu Alsan and Dimitris Mourlas did the mixing, while mastering was done by Mirko D'Agostino and Tom Coyne.

A pop album, Yeni Ay came to existence at a time when the singer "needed to see the light". She chose the title Yeni Ay to reflect the "new beginnings, new hopes and new beauties" inside the album. She described Yeni Ay as "an album that lights hope. More fun and fast. An album that can be learned more easily." She also stated that making the album was a "journey of hope, beginnings, innovations and new intentions." She further stated: "It [Yeni Ay] is no different [from my other albums]. I again wrote the lyrics, and made the compositions together with Efe. The only difference is that my other friends also joined us, and what a good thing they did! İskender Paydaş, Can Baydar, Bedük, Fatih Ahıskalı. What else can you expect?!"

== Critical reception ==
Yeni Ay received mixed reviews from music critics. The lyrics were praised, yet Sıla's repetition of the same style resulted in a number of different views. Radikal's Sarp Dakni stated that after the huge success of Konuşmadığımız Şeyler Var, he had high expectations for Sıla's future works, and as those expectations were not met with Vaveyla, he had impatiently waited for Yeni Ay. At the end of this waiting, he was pleased with the album and wrote: "Just like its predecessor Vaveyla, Yeni Ay is not turning to a new and different direction. Sıla is in the safe zone again. But this time we give up. Because we are much happier with listening to her like this." According to Milliyet Sanat's Yavuz Hakan Tok, despite working with the same team again, Sıla had managed to save herself from repetition. Tok compared the album to Vaveyla and said: "Compared to the depressive mood in the previous album, this one has a more balanced distribution with spacious and cheerful songs." Milliyet's Asu Maro beilved that with Yeni Ay, Sıla had "solidified her place as both a singer and composer".

Writing for Hürriyet, Hikmet Demirkol found elements of alaturka (Ottoman music) in the album and described it as "an album with details and content that will make fans happy." Sadi Tirak from the same newspaper wrote that "In the previous album I didn't find any song that I would have liked to listened to for the second time; this time 'Vaziyetler', 'Yeter', 'Reverans', 'Doldur' and 'Saki' seem to be breaking that curse." Bugün's Bilal Özcan congratulated Sıla on writing the songs in the album and recommended getting Yeni Ay to everyone. Writing for Pop Kedi website Emre Toprak praised the album and mentioned that "it's a work that has flavors of Sıla's first three albums [Sıla, İmza, Konuşmadığımız Şeyler Var]". He also praised the singer's ability in songwriting by saying that "Sıla is following the footprints of Turkey's best female songwriters Aysel Gürel and Sezen Aksu, and it can change the course of Turkish pop music a bit during a time when Turkish pop is getting ruined." Dilimin Ayarı Yok's writer Cem Özsancak believed that Sıla had repeated herself with this album: "Unfortunately, there's nothing new in Yeni Ay. With these five albums we have faced the same woman, same melodies, and songs that resemble each other, and in some cases can hardly be distinguished from one another. [...] It's not even enough to say that she's repeating herself, she is repeating her previous repetitions over and over again."

== Commercial performance ==
Yeni Ay sold 70,000 copies on its first week of release in Turkey and topped D&R's List of Best-Selling Albums. It held the top position on the list for weeks. From its release, it topped iTunes Store sales list in Turkey for months, later breaking the record for staying the longest on top of the list in Turkey. According to MÜ-YAP, the album sold 158,000 physical copies by the end of 2014. As a result, it became Turkey's best-selling album in 2014 in both digital and physical formats. Sıla also became the singer with the most number of listeners on Spotify in Turkey. "Saki", "Yeter" and "Yabancı" also became the songs with the most number of views on Spotify in Turkey. Yeni Ay also became the album with the most number streams on Deezer in May 2014.

At the 2014 Kral Turkey Music Awards, Yeni Ay received the Best Album award, while Sıla was given the Best Female Artist award and was named the Artist with the Most Number of Streams on Radios. "Yabancı"'s remixed version earned Bedük the Best Remix award. Haliç University gave Yeni Ay the Best Album award at its 2014 The Bests of the Year Awards.

== Music videos ==
The album's first music video was made for the song "Vaziyetler". It was directed by Emre Akay and released on 11 February 2014, one week before the album's actual release. In the video, Sıla played the role of "a jealous woman who goes mad and unleashes her anger on the person that she loves". Hürriyet's Onur Baştürk liked the video in general. However, he was unable to decide whether Sıla's face expressions when beating her friend were worse or her hair model. On 27 February 2014, the song topped Türkçe Top 20 and kept that position for eleven weeks. The second music video was released for the album's first song "Yabancı" on 3 June 2014. It was directed by Ergin Turunç and recorded at the ITU School of Architecture. Similar to "Vaziyetler", "Yabancı" ranked first on Turkey's official music chart and remained in that position for a week.

The third music video was made for the song "Reverans", which was, according to Milliyet Sanat's Yavuz Hakan Tok, "the album's most youthful song". The video was directed by Ergin Turunç and released on 29 September 2014. Unlike its predecessors, "Reverans" just succeeded in rising up to the second position on the official music chart. The music video for "Hediye" was released on 17 March 2015. It was directed by Ergin Turunç and recorded in Marrakesh, Morocco. "Hediye" ranked first on Turkey's official music chart and stayed in that position for two weeks. To promote the album, Sıla appeared on Beyaz Show on 18 April 2014 and gave various concerts in Turkey and Europe.

== Track listing ==
Disc 1 – Yeni Ay
No.	Title	Writer(s)	Composer(s)	Length
1.	"Yabancı"	Sıla Gençoğlu	Efe Bahadır	4:38
2.	"Vaziyetler"	Gençoğlu	Gençoğlu · Bahadır	3:19
3.	"Yeter"	Gençoğlu	Gençoğlu · Bahadır	3:59
4.	"Reverans"	Gençoğlu	Gençoğlu · Bahadır	3:39
5.	"Sevgili Kaybım"	Gençoğlu	Gençoğlu · Bahadır	2:40
6.	"Merhabalar"	Gençoğlu	Gençoğlu · Bahadır	3:31
7.	"Doldur"	Can Baydar · Gençoğlu	Baydar	4:14
8.	"Hediye"	Gençoğlu	Gençoğlu · Bahadır	3:54
9.	"Saki"	Gençoğlu	Fatih Ahıskalı	4:06
10.	"Tamam mıyız?"	Gençoğlu	Bahadır	3:11
11.	"Yabancı" (Bedük Version)	Gençoğlu	Bahadır	4:35
Total length:				41:46

Disc 2 – Demos
No.	Title	Length
1.	"Geldik" (Demo)	0:20
2.	"Sevgili Kaybım" (Demo)	2:35
3.	"Yeter" (Demo)	2:49
4.	"Yabancı" (Demo)	4:01
5.	"Vaziyetler" (Demo)	2:29
6.	"Doldur" (Demo)	2:49
7.	"Merhabalar" (Demo)	3:06
8.	"Tamam mıyız?" (Demo)	2:58
9.	"Saki" (Demo)	3:39
10.	"Reverans" (Demo)	3:30
11.	"Hediye" (Demo)	2:47
12.	"Gittik" (Demo)	1:21
Total length:		32:01

== Personnel ==
- Sıla Gençoğlu – main vocals (all of the songs); backing vocals (7); songwriter (all of the songs); composer (2–6, 8); producer, demos
- Efe Bahadır – composer (1–6, 8, 10, 11); arrangement (2, 3, 5–7, 9, 10); backing vocals (7); guitar (1–10); producer, demos
- İskender Paydaş – arrangement (1, 4, 8); drums (1, 4, 8); hammond organ (1, 4, 8); synthesizer (1, 4, 8)
- Fatih Ahıskalı – composer (9); arranger (9); oud (2, 3, 8, 9); cümbüş (2, 5, 8, 9); demos
- Bedük – composer (11); backing vocals (11)
- Can Baydar – songwriter (7); composer (7); backing vocals (7)
- Arzu Alsan – recording (all of the songs); mixing (5, 9, 10, all of the demos)
- Alp Turaç – recording (all of the songs); mixing (6, 7)
- Saygın Özatmaca – recording (all of the songs); edit
- Dimitris Mourlas – mixing (1–4, 8)
- Tom Coyne (Sterling Sound) – mastering
- Mirko D'Agostino – mastering (all of the demos)
- Dünya Kızılçay – backing vocals (1, 2, 4, 6, 7, 9)
- Sibel Gürsoy – backing vocals (1, 2, 4, 6, 7, 9)
- Tuba Önal – backing vocals (1, 2, 4, 6, 7, 9)
- Ortaç Aydınoğlu – accordion (6)
- Çanakkaleli Volkan – asma davul (2)
- Cudi Genç – bass (1, 2, 4–10)
- Alp Ersönmez – bass (3)
- Manolis Karadinis – bouzouki (8)
- Özer Arkun – cello (10)
- Nedim Ruacan - drums (2, 3, 6, 7, 9, 10)
- Gürkan Çakmak – duduk (3)
- Erdem Başer – electric guitar (7)
- Thanasis Vasilopoulos – clarinet (1)
- Göksun Çavdar – wind instruments (7); clarinet (11)
- Anıl Şallıel – wind instruments (7)
- Hasan Gözetlik – wind instruments (7)
- Cengiz Ercümer – percussion (1–6, 8); coffee cup (5)
- Burak Erkul – piano (3, 5) Rhodes piano (6, 9); demos
- Atlas Yaylı Grubu – bowed string instruments (3, 10)
- Gündem Yaylı Grubu – bowed string instruments (1, 4, 8)
- Babajim Studios – studio, arrangement
- Sierra Studios – studio
- Gözde Mutluer – cover design
- Mehmet Arif Cengiz – edit
- Serkan Özyurt – edit
- Yasemin Kağa – management
- Ergin Turunç – photographer

Credits adapted from Yeni Ay's album booklet.

== Charts ==
Chart (2014)	Peak position
Turkey (D&R Best-Selling Albums)	1

== Sales ==
Country	Sales
Turkey (MÜ-YAP)	158,041

== Release history ==
Country	Date	Format	Label
Turkey	18 February 2014	CD · digital download	Sony · Columbia
Worldwide	18 February 2014	Digital download	Sony · Columbia
Turkey	9 July 2015	LP record	Sony · Columbia
