= Sıla =

Sıla may refer to:

- Sıla (given name), Turkish feminine name
- Sıla (TV series), Turkish drama series
- Sıla (singer), a Turkish singer
- Sıla (album), 2007 album by the Turkish singer Sıla
