= Olmaz =

Olmaz may refer to:

== People ==
- Ayberk Olmaz (born 1996), Turkish basketball player

== Music ==
- Bana Bi'şey Olmaz, 2010 album by Turkish artist Özlem Tekin
- Masumiyetin Ziyan Olmaz, 2010 album by Turkish group mor ve ötesi
- "Olmaz", 2006 single by Turkish artist Kenan Doğulu
- "Olmaz Oğlan", 2005 single by Turkish group Hepsi
- "Olmaz Olsun", 1976 single by Turkish artist Sezen Aksu

== Television ==
- A Bandit Cannot Rule the World, Turkish television series first broadcast from 2015 to 2021
