= Keser (surname) =

Keser is a Turkish surname. Notable people with the surname include:

- Beth Keser, American electronics packaging engineer
- Erdal Keser (born 1961), Turkish footballer
- Gökhan Keser (born 1987), Turkish model, actor, and singer
- İbrahim Halil Keser (born 1997), Turkish footballer
- Polat Keser (born 1985), German-born Turkish footballer
