= Aslı Güngör =

Turkish pop singer and songwriter (born 1979)

- Born: 27 September 1979 (age 46)
- Origin: İzmir, Turkey
- Occupations: Singer-songwriter, composer
- Instrument: Vocals
- Years active: 2007–present
- Labels: Güngör Müzik Production & Çınar Müzik

Aslı Güngör (Turkish pronunciation: [asˈɫɯ ˈɟynɟœɾ]; born 27 September 1979) is a Turkish pop singer and songwriter.

She became a professional singer when she was discovered by the "TRT İzmir Gençlik Korosu" talent show while studying at Dokuz Eylül University. She featured in DMC's "Pop Music Project" with Enbe Orkestrası with the songs "İzmir Bilir Ya" and "Kalp Kalbe Karşı". On 22 January 2009, she published her first full album which carries her own name. The first music video from this album was "Son Öpücük" which became a hit song. The second clip is "Dön Gel Yeter" which was released on Valentine's Day, 2009.

Her second album is Aşk Alev Aldı released in 2010 through Sony Music. The track "Ben de Dahil" was released as a music video.

== Discography ==
=== Albums ===
- Aslı Güngör (2009)
- Enerji (2013)

=== EPs ===
- Aşk Alev Aldı (2010)
- Aslı Gibidir (2012)

=== Singles ===
- Bana Seni Gerek Seni (2011)
- Meleklerin Yolu (2020)
- Unutursun (2022)

=== Music videos ===
- Kalp Kalbe Karşı (2008)
- İzmir Bilir Ya (2008)
- Son Öpücük (2009)
- Dön Gel Yeter (2009)
- Ben De Dahil (2010)
- Bana Seni Gerek Seni (2011)
- Söylenmemiş Sözler (2012)
- İhanet (2013)
- Aşkın Anahtarı (2014)
- Sus (2015)

=== Duets ===
- Kalp Kalbe Karşı (with Ferhat Göçer)
- Dön Gel Yeter (with Ferhat Göçer)
- Beni Tanı (with Ege Çubukçu)
- Belki De Şans (Opa) (with Kamufle)
- Ben Seni Sevdim (with Sinan Özen)
- Yalnız Kaldım (with Kamufle)
- Sus (with Yaşar İpek)

== Awards ==
Year	Awards	Category
2009	Golden Butterfly Awards	Best Newcomer
2009	MÜ-YAP	The Most Streamed Song on Digital Platforms (Kalp Kalbe Karşı)
