= Konuşmadığımız Şeyler Var =

Studio album by Sıla
- Released: 24 November 2010
- Genre: Pop · soft rock · jazz
- Length: 44:33
- Label: Sony

Sıla chronology
İmza (2009)	Konuşmadığımız Şeyler Var (2010)	Joker (2012)

Konuşmadığımız Şeyler Var (There Are Things We Haven't Talked About) is the third studio album by Turkish singer Sıla. It was released on 24 November 2010 by Sony Music Entertainment. It was the singer's first major work since the release of her 2009 album İmza. The album features pop, soft rock and jazz rhythms. Ten of the songs on the album were written by Sıla, and one of them was written together with Gözde Kansu. She composed ten of the songs together with Efe Bahadır, and one of them with Bahadır and Kerem Türkaydın.

Containing 12 songs in total, Konuşmadığımız Şeyler Var received positive reviews from critics. Sıla's compositions and songwriting abilities were praised. The first single from the album, "Acısa da Öldürmez", was released on Sıla's official website in November 2010, and the site broke down due to the enormous number of visits. After releasing a music video for "Acısa da Öldürmez", Sıla released further music videos for the songs "Oluruna Bırak", "Kafa", "Boş Yere" and "Tam da Bugün". Out of these songs, "Acısa da Öldürmez", "Kafa" and "Boş Yere" ranked first on Türkçe Top 20. "Oluruna Bırak" also rose to number two.

After the album's preparation process, which lasted for a year, Sıla stated that she had become more mature with Konuşmadığımız Şeyler Var compared to her previous works. The album topped D&R's list of best-selling albums, and stayed among the top works o the list for about a year. By the end of 2010, the album sold 100,000 copies and received the Best Album award at the award ceremony organized by Kadir Has University. It was also nominated for the Album of the Year award at the 2011 TRT Müzik Awards and 2011 Kral Music Awards. The singer later rearranged five of the album's songs and included them in her 2012 compilation album Joker.

== Background and content ==
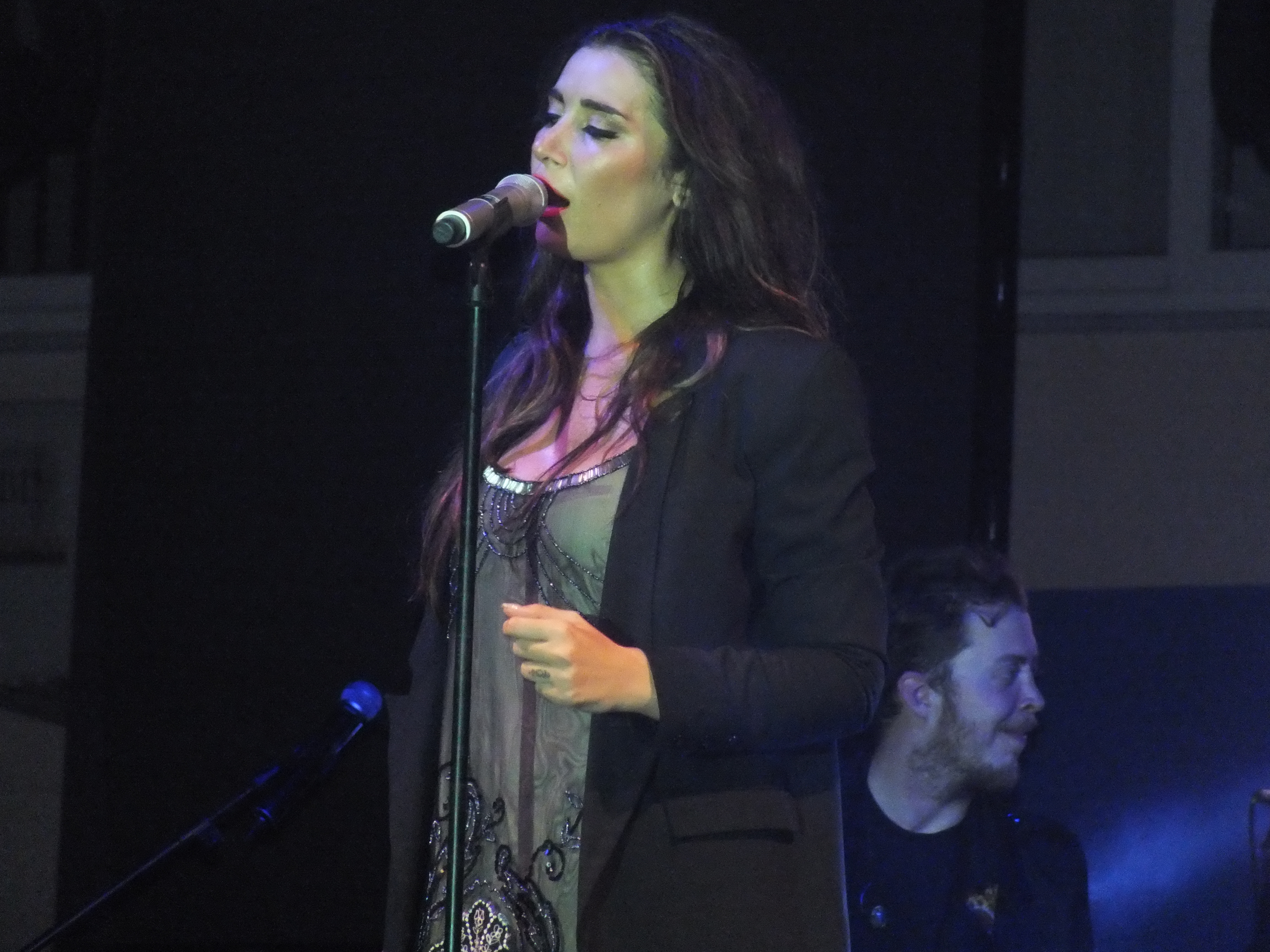
Sıla wrote ten of the album's songs by herself and one of them together with Efe Bahadır.

Sıla released her second studio album İmza in 2009. The songs "Sevişmeden Uyumayalım", "İnşallah", "Bana Biraz Renk Ver" and "Yara Bende" from this album were turned into music videos. Two of these songs topped Türkçe Top 20, and the others ranked among the top four on the list. She later performed the song "Alain Delon" on Ozan Doğulu's first album 130 Bpm, which was released by Doğan Music Company in June 2010. "Alain Delon" also ranked first on Turkey's official music chart.

In early November 2010, Sıla announced that her new album was almost finished and she was excited to share it with music fans. On 9 November 2010, the album's lead single, "Acısa da Öldürmez", was released on Sıla's official website and due to the enormous number of visits the website broke down.

On 24 November 2010, Sıla's third studio album Konuşmadığımız Şeyler Var was released by Sony Music Entertainment. The album contains twelve songs, and on its first piece, "Öndeyiş", only oud sounds were used. The oud was played by Fatih Ahıskalı. Out of the eleven other songs, ten of them were written solely by Sıla and one together with Gözde Kansu. She composed ten of these songs together with Efe Bahadır, while for the one remaining song, Sıla worked with Kerem Türkaydın alongside Bahadır. The third songs of the album, "Kafa", was rearranged by Ozan Doğulu and included in the album under the title "Kafoz" in the tenth place. For the album's final song, Sıla performed a new version of "Vur Kadehi Ustam", which had originally appeared in Ferhat Göçer's 2007 album Yolun Açık Olsun.

Sıla later stated that the album had a more mature music style compared to her previous works, and as to why she had chosen the title Konuşmadığımız Şeyler Var for the album, she said: "There are people who laugh in each other's face, and say unnecessary things about one another behind closed doors. I wanted to underline this issue." She also said that the song from the album that was about her the most was the ninth song, "Cam", which she wrote when "looking back at the high school years". She also dedicated the song "Zamanında", which she had written together with Gözde Kansu, to all of her fans.

An album with pop, soft rock and jazz rhythms, Konuşmadığımız Şeyler Var was prepared over the course of one year and recorded at Doğulu Studios by Arzu Alsan. It topped D&R's list of best-selling albums in Turkey, and remained among the top titles for about a year. According to MÜ-YAP, the album sold 100,000 copies by the end of 2010 in Turkey. It received the Most Special Album by a Female Artist award at theaward ceremony organized by Kadir Has University. It was also nominated for the Album of the Year at the 2011 Kral Music Awards and 2011 TRT Müzik Awards, but lost the first one to Tarkan's Adımı Kalbine Yaz and the second one to Emre Aydın's Kağıt Evler. Sıla later chose the songs "Boşver", "Cam" and "Vur Kadehi Ustam" (under the title "Vur Kadehi") to be rearranged and published in her 2012 compilation album Joker.

== Critical reception ==
Konuşmadığımız Şeyler Var received positive reviews from music critics, and Sıla's ability in songwriting was praised. Writing for Sabah, Alper Bahçekapılı said that the album was very "refined" and one of the "most special pop" albums that he had listened to in recent years. Music website Gerçek Pop stated that the "songs ranged from medium to good" and gave the album 3.5 out of 5 points. The website found Sıla's choice of the title "Öndeyiş" for the first song very elegant, and claimed that with "Boş Yere" the singer could be a nominee for Best Female Pop Vocal Performance at the Grammy Awards if it was held in Turkey. They also described "Gol"'s chorus as very special, and claimed that "Vur Kadehi Ustam" was performed better than its original version. They classified Sıla's voice as one of the "best suited" voices and stated that her path was clear with "writing more beautiful lyrics".

Milliyet's Gülüm Dağlı found the album very hot and compared it to "a sad love movie" and "an immersive novel". Dağlı also stated that like "Sevişmeden Uyumayalım" (İmza, 2009), this album didn't have any catchy dance songs, except "Gol". She also chose "Zamanında" as her favorite song in the album. Güneri Cıvaoğlu from the same newspaper described the lyrics as "stark and deep" and stated that one could find colors of "Aegean breeze, French zephyr and Portuguese fado" in Sıla's songs. Mehmet Tez from the same newspaper also gave the album a positive review and began his comments by praising Sıla's voice. Tez found the songs powerful and stated that the album was not "arrangement-oriented". He also noted that the "compositions stand out" first, and believed that the song "Gol" did not fit well with this album. Radioman Michael Kuyucu wrote that the album had risen Sıla from the branch she had been on to a higher one. He also praised the use of "very realistic" lyrics on the songs and believed that the singer had used "concepts that nobody has ever used until now but definitely a lot [of people] have lived through". He also mentioned that Efe Bahadır and Sıla's mutual work on the album was successful, and Konuşmadığımız Şeyler Var was an album that needed to be included in everyone's archives. Hürriyet's Onur Baştürk named "Tam da Bugün" as his favorite song from the album.

== Music videos ==
Five music videos were released for Konuşmadığımız Şeyler Var. The five songs were all written by Sıla and composed together with Efe Bahadır. The first music video was made for the album's promotional single "Acısa da Öldürmez". It was directed by Murat Onbul and put together as a "simple" video to be released around the release date of the album. The song topped Türkçe Top 20 in December 2010 and kept this position for eight weeks. It was nominated or the Best Song award at the Kral Music Awards, Siyaset Dergisi Awards and TRT Müzik Awards but did not succeed in receiving any of them, losing the first and third to Tarkan's "Sevdanın Son Vuruşu" (Adımı Kalbine Yaz, 2010) and the second one to Gülşen's "Sözde Ayrılık".

The second music video was released for "Oluruna Bırak" at the request of Sıla's fans. The music video was directed by the album's photographer Kemal Doğulu and recorded in New York City. It was first broadcast on television on 28 January 2011. The songs ranked second on Turkey's official music chart and remained in that position for three weeks.

In January 2011, it was reported that third music video from Konuşmadığımız Şeyler Var would be made for the song "Gol", followed by another video for "Kafa". However, it was later announced that third music video was being made for "Kafa". The video was directed by Tamer Başaran and taken over the course of two days in Büyükada, Heybeliada and Suadiye. Its broadcasting began on 9 August 2011. "Kafa" initially ranked third on Turkey's official music but rose to the first position on the second week and kept that place for three weeks. It became the second song from Konuşmadığımız Şeyler Var to top the official chart.

The fourth music video was made for the album's fifth song "Boş Yere". The video was taken in Santorini, Greece, and directed by Sıla herself. It was released on music channels on 6 October 2011. The song topped Turkey's official music chart for four weeks.

The fifth and final music video was made for the album's eighth song "Tam da Bugün" at the request of her fans. The video was prepared in Prague, Czech Republic, during Sıla's trip to the country.

== Track listing ==
No.	Title	Writer(s)	Composer(s)	Length
1.	"Öndeyiş"		Fatih Ahıskalı	0:28
2.	"Acısa da Öldürmez"	Sıla Gençoğlu	Gençoğlu · Efe Bahadır	3:24
3.	"Kafa"	Gençoğlu	Gençoğlu · Bahadır	2:57
4.	"Oluruna Bırak"	Gençoğlu	Gençoğlu · Bahadır	4:03
5.	"Boş Yere"	Gençoğlu	Gençoğlu · Bahadır	4:00
6.	"Gol"	Gençoğlu	Gençoğlu · Bahadır	4:01
7.	"Boşver"	Gençoğlu	Gençoğlu · Bahadır · Kerem Türkaydın	4:44
8.	"Tam da Bugün"	Gençoğlu	Gençoğlu · Bahadır	2:52
9.	"Cam"	Gençoğlu	Gençoğlu · Bahadır	3:21
10.	"Kafoz"	Gençoğlu	Gençoğlu · Bahadır	4:09
11.	"Zamanında"	Gençoğlu · Gözde Kansu	Gençoğlu · Bahadır	5:28
12.	"Vur Kadehi Ustam"	Gençoğlu	Gençoğlu · Bahadır	5:06
Total length:				44:33

Notes

- The tenth song, "Kafoz", is an alternative version of the third song, "Kafa", and has different arrangements.
- The last song, "Vur Kadehi Ustam", first appeared on Ferhat Göçer's 2007 album Yolun Açık Olsun.

== Personnel ==
- Sony Music Entertainment – production
- Sıla Gençoğlu – singer, songwriter, composer
- Efe Bahadır – composer, arranger, vocals, acoustic guitar, electric guitar, classic guitar
- Kerem Türkaydın – composer, electric guitar
- Gözde Kansu – songwriter
- Fatih Ahıskalı – oud, cümbüş
- Ozan Doğulu – arranger, Rhodes piano, piano, hammond organ
- Cudi Genç – bass
- Serkan Ayman – drums
- Göksun Çavdar – clarinet
- Gündem Yaylı Grubu – bowed string instrument
- Cengiz Ercümer – percussion, tom-tom drum
- Erdem Sökmen – classic guitar
- Gürkan Çakmak – duduk
- Burak Erkul – piano
- Mehmet Akatay – daf
- Turgut Özüfler – qanun
- Sevingül Bahadır – vocals
- Gökhan Keser – vocals
- Murat Çekem – vocals
- Açelya Kılıç – vocals
- Çağlar Türkmen – mastering
- Arzu Alsan – recording, mixing
- Kemal Doğulu – photographer
- Doğulu Std. – studio
- Day1 Entertainment Turkey – management, organization
- Yasemin Kağa – management, organization

Credits adapted from Konuşmadığımız Şeyler Var's album booklet.

== Charts ==
Chart (2010)	Peak position
Turkey (D&R Best-Selling Albums)	1

== Release history ==
Country	Date	Format	Label
Turkey	24 November 2010	CD	Sony Music Entertainment
Turkey	29 November 2010	Digital download	Sony Music Entertainment
Worldwide	29 November 2010	Digital download	Sony Music Entertainment
