= Mürekkep =

Studio album by Sıla
- Released: 6 May 2016
- Genre: Pop
- Length: 45:11
- Label: Sony · Columbia
- Producer: Sıla Gençoğlu · Efe Bahadır

Sıla chronology
Yeni Ay (2014)	Mürekkep (2016)	Acı (2019)

Singles from Mürekkep
- 1. "Afitap" Released: 29 April 2016

Mürekkep (Ink) is the sixth studio album by Turkish singer Sıla. It was released on 6 May 2016 by Sony Music Entertainment and Columbia Records.

== Release and content ==
Sıla explained the preparation process of the album as follows: "We prepared a part of the album in our own studio and some parts of it in Athens. Some of them were prepared in the studio of Iskender Paydaş and some in the studio of Ozan Bayraşa. The studio phase was a long process. The writing stage of the songs had already begun when we released the album Yeni Ay. We like to spend more time in the studio as a team. Because different ideas and changes can arise. We don't leave the studio without sneaking out some new ideas. After completing everything and saying yes, we complete the studio phase."

The audio mixing of the songs was done by Arzu Alsan, Alp Turaç and Dimitris Mourras. Steve Fallone from Sterling Sound performed the audio mastering. The album's photographs were taken by Emre Ünal. Cengiz Abazoğlu prepared the singer's outfits for the photo shoot.

== Music videos ==
The album's first music video was made for the song "Afitap" and directed by Bedran Güzel. It was released on 29 April 2016.

== Track listing ==
No.	Title	Writer(s)	Composer(s)	Length
1.	"Lacivert"		Efe Bahadır	1:16
2.	"Ziyan"	Sıla Gençoğlu	Gençoğlu · Bahadır	4:02
3.	"Can Dostum"	Gençoğlu	Bahadır	4:02
4.	"Engerek"	Gençoğlu	Gençoğlu · Bahadır	3:57
5.	"Afitap"	Gençoğlu	Florent Boshnjaku	3:56
6.	"Müstehcen"	Gençoğlu	Gençoğlu · Fatih Ahıskalı · Bahadır	3:22
7.	"Yan Benimle"	Gençoğlu	Ahıskalı	4:43
8.	"Bırak"	Gençoğlu	Bahadır	4:24
9.	"Münferit"	Gençoğlu	Gençoğlu · Bahadır	3:07
10.	"Kurşun"	Gençoğlu	Bahadır	4:09
11.	"Günaydın Sevgilim"	Gençoğlu	Bahadır	4:26
12.	"Engerek" (Bedük Remix)	Gençoğlu	Gençoğlu · Bahadır	3:47
Total length:				45:11

== Personnel ==
- Steve Fallone - mastering
- Efe Bahadır - acoustic guitar (tracks 1, 2, 3, 7, 8, 10), vocals (track 2), guitar (tracks 4, 6, 11), keyboards (track 4), electric guitar (track 5), percussion (track 10)
- Dünya Kızılçay - vocals (tracks 1, 2, 5, 6)
- Sibel Gürsoy - vocals (tracks 1, 2, 5, 6)
- Tûba Önal - vocals (track 1, 2, 5, 6)
- İskender Paydaş - drums (tracks 2, 11), keyboards (tracks 2, 11), percussions (tracks 2, 11)
- Caner Üstündağ - bass (tracks 2, 11)
- Mehmet Arif Cengiz - editing (tracks 2, 11), recording (tracks 2, 11)
- Saygın Özatmaca - editing (tracks 2, 11), recording (tracks 2, 11)
- Serkan Özyurt - editing (tracks 2, 11), recording (tracks 2, 11)
- Zafer Paydaş - editing (tracks 2, 11), recording (tracks 2, 11)
- Dimitris Mourlas - mixing (tracks 2, 11)
- Ozan Bayraşa - ukulele [bass] (tracks 3, 9), acoustic guitar (track 9)
- Alpdoğan Türeci - drums (tracks 3, 4, 6, 7, 8, 10)
- Arzu Alsan - mixing (tracks 3, 4, 6, 7, 8, 9), recording (tracks 4, 5, 6, 7, 8, 10), editing (tracks 5, 6, 7, 8, 10)
- Emre Kıral - mixing (track 3)
- Yasemin Özler - strings (track 3)
- Çağlar Haznedaroğlu - strings (track 3)
- Alp Ersönmez - bass (tracks 4, 8, 9)
- Batu Şallıel - brass (tracks 4, 6, 8, 12)
- Göksun Çavdar - brass (tracks 4, 6, 8, 12)
- Hasan Gözetlik - brass (tracks 4, 6, 8, 12)
- Cengiz Ercümer - percussion (tracks 4, 5, 6, 7), cajón (track 10), shaker (track 10)
- Fatih Ahıskalı - acoustic guitar (track 5), oud (tracks 5, 8, 10, 11), cümbüş (tracks 5, 10), guitar (track 6)
- Eralp Görgün - bass (track 5)
- Bülent Altınbaş - clarinet (track 5)
- Hasan Umut Önder - editing (track 5), recording (track 5), mixing (track 5)
- Turgut Özüfler - kanun (tracks 5, 7)
- Kempa Yaylı Grubu - strings (track 5)
- İlyas Tetik - violin (track 5)
- Cudi Genç - bass (tracks 6, 7, 10)
- Semih Çelikel - violin (tracks 6, 10)
- Özer Arkun - cello (track 7)
- Burak Erkul - electric piano (track 7), piano (track 8), keyboards (tracks 8, 10)
- Kaan Ahıskalı - percussion (track 7)
- Mustafa İpekçioğlu - bağlama (track 8)
- Sertaç Çevikkol - bassoon (track 9)
- Serdar Barçın - flute (track 9)
- Türker Çolak - percussion (track 9)
- Alp Turaç - mixing (track 10)
- Gündem Yaylı Grubu - strings (track 11)
- Bedük - guitar (track 12), mixing (track 12)
- Emre Ünal - photography
- Melek Boçoğlu - cover design

== Charts ==
Chart (2016)	Peak position
Belgium (Ultratop)	185
Turkey (D&R Best-Selling)	1

== Sales ==
Country	Sales
Turkey (MÜ-YAP)	101,726

== Release history ==
Country	Date	Format(s)	Label
Turkey	6 May 2016	CD · digital download	Sony · Columbia
Worldwide	6 May 2016	Digital download	Sony · Columbia
