= Sıla (given name) =

Sıla (səh-LAH, Turkish pronunciation: [sɯˈɫɑ]) is a feminine given name of Turkish origin. In Turkish it means "to reunite with relatives and loved ones after a long time". Notable people with the name include:

== Given name ==
- Sıla (singer) (born 1980), Turkish singer and songwriter
- Sıla Çağlar (born 2004), Turkish chess player
- Sıla Çalışkan (born 1996), Turkish volleyball player
- Sıla Usar İncirli (born 1972), Turkish Cypriot neurologist, politician, researcher, and trade unionist
- Sıla Karakuş (born 2004), Turkish trampoline gymnast
- Sıla Koloğlu (born 2004), Turkish middle distance runner
- Sıla Şahin (born 1985), German-Turkish actress
- Sıla Saygı (born 1996), Turkish figure skater
- Sıla Türkoğlu (born 1999), Turkish actress
