= Gülden (singer) =

Turkish singer

- Birth name: Gülden Ayşe Arslan
- Also known as: Gülden
- Born: 2 January 1983 (age 42); Tekirdağ, Turkey
- Genres: Pop
- Occupation: Singer-songwriter
- Years active: 2012–present
- Labels: 565 Yapım, Pasaj, DMC, Sony Music, ONErpm

Gülden Ayşe Arslan (born 2 January 1983) is a Turkish pop music artist. Her breakthrough came with the song "Unutamam Dedin", which became a hit in Turkey.

== Life and career ==
Gülden was born in 1983 in Tekirdağ. She began songwriting while in secondary school. In 2001, she enrolled in Ege University State Conservatory and graduated in 2005 after studying basic sciences.

While studying at university, she started performing at various locations across İzmir. She then joined the TRT crew and played violin during their concert tours. For 2 years, she was part of the Aegean Army's orchestra. Between 2008 and 2012, she settled in London with her husband, a restaurant owner. She was the conductor of a local choir in London and took the stage in the parliament. To record the demos for her songs, she went back to Turkey where she met with Emre Aydın.

Gülden made her debut with the single "Unutamam Dedin", which was arranged by Mustafa Ceceli. Additionally, she wrote and composed "Soğuk Odalar", the lead single for Emre Aydın's 2012 album. She then performed a duet with Aydın. She released her debut studio album Sen Yokken Olanlar in 2014. The song "Yatsın Yanıma" from this album became a hit in Turkey and its music video garnered over 110 million views on YouTube.

Gülden has a daughter, named Melissa Mutlu.

== Discography ==
=== Albums ===
- Sen Yokken Olanlar (2014)

=== EPs ===
- Müdavim (2020)
- Arşiv 1 (2023)

=== Singles ===
- "Unutamam Dedin" (2012)
- "Uzun Lafın Kısası" (feat. Bahadır Tatlıöz & Ozan Doğulu) (2016)
- "Bye Bye" (2016)
- "Açık Yara" (2017)
- "Ne Biliyorsun Hakkımda" (ft. Aşkım Kapışmak) (2017)
- "Ben Seni Böyle mi Sevdim?" (2018)
- "Çiçek Gibi" (2018)
- "Kandırmışlar Aşk Diye" (2019)
- "Mendil" (2019)
- "Yakarım İstanbul'u" (2019)
- "Yandan Yandan" (2021)
- "İçimize mi Atalım" (2022)
- "Güzelleşelim" (2022)
- "Bu Saatten Sonra" (2022)
- "Ne Söyledi Tanrı Sana" (2022)
- "Öldürdü Ama Gömmüyor" (2023)
- "Yok" (2024)
- "Aşk Bir Yangın" (with Bahadır Tatlıöz) (2024)
- "Cam Kenarı" (2024)
- "Soğuk Odalar" (with Bayhan) (2024)
- "Aptal mıyım?" (2025)
- "Bi' Damla" (with Tan Taşçı) (2025)
- "Sen Anlamazsın" (2025)
