= İbrahim Halil Keser =

Turkish footballer

Personal information
- Full name: İbrahim Halil Keser
- Date of birth: 2 July 1997 (age 29)
- Place of birth: Adıyaman, Turkey
- Position: Midfielder

Youth career
- 2009–2010: Adıyaman Gapspor
- 2010–2014: Gaziantepspor

Senior career*
Years	Team	Apps	(Gls)
2013–2018	Gaziantepspor	11	(0)
- * Club domestic league appearances and goals as of 1 October 2018

İbrahim Halil Keser (born 2 July 1997) is a Turkish footballer who most recently played as a midfielder for Gaziantepspor. He made his Süper Lig debut on 17 May 2013 against Mersin İdman Yurdu.
