= Şarkıcı =

Studio album by Sıla
- Released: 20 May 2022
- Genre: Pop
- Length: 49:28
- Label: Sony
- Producer: Sıla Gençoğlu

Sıla chronology
Acı Meşk Aslolan Heves (2020)	Şarkıcı (2022)

Singles from Şarkıcı
- 1. "Şarkıcı" Released: 13 May 2022

Şarkıcı (Singer) is the seventh studio album by Turkish singer Sıla. It was released on 20 May 2022 by Sony Music Entertainment. The album was produced by Sıla herself, who wrote the lyrics for fourteen out of the fifteen tracks in the album in collaboration with other artists.

== Music videos ==
The first promotional singer from the album, also titled "Şarkıcı" was released together with a music video on 13 May 2022. The music video, directed by Bedran Güzel, garnered a million views in two days and the album became among the trending topics on Twitter in Turkey. The second music video, "Velhasıl", was released together with the album on 20 May 2022. The third music video, "Kalksın Uyuyanlar", was released on 21 October 2022 and dedicated to Mahsa Amini, an Iranian girl who died due to the brutalities of Iran's religious morality police. The fourth music video, "Arz", was released on 3 February 2023 and was made using footage from her concerts.

== Critical reception ==
Serhat Tekin of Hürriyet described the album's tone as "classical Sıla style" and named "Öpücük ve Kurabiye" as the song that stood out the most. Writing for the same paper, Hikmet Demirkol stated that Şarkıcı was a "very rich album in terms of musical style" and commended Sıla for releasing an album in a music market that is dominated by singles. Milliyet's Mayk Şişman named "Sek" as the album's best song and added: "The album has a Turkish style on the one hand and a European style on the other. From the beginning to the end, the Aegean seam has been added to the fullest".

== Track listing ==
No.	Title	Writer(s)	Composer(s)	Length
1.	"Şarkıcı"	Sıla Gençoğlu	Gürsel Çelik	2:31
2.	"Kalksın Uyuyanlar"	Gençoğlu	Gençoğlu	4:10
3.	"Velhasıl"	Gençoğlu · Umut Yaşar Sarıkaya	Gençoğlu · Sarıkaya	2:57
4.	"Sek"	Gençoğlu · Sarıkaya	Gençoğlu · Sarıkaya	3:18
5.	"Başgan"	Gençoğlu	Gençoğlu	3:14
6.	"Ansızın"	Cem Adrian · Gençoğlu	Adrian	4:07
7.	"Arz"	Gençoğlu · Sarıkaya	Gençoğlu · Sarıkaya	3:09
8.	"Sen Ağla"	Sezen Aksu	Aksu	2:48
9.	"Yemyeşil"	Gençoğlu	Gençoğlu	3:06
10.	"Suskun"	Gençoğlu · Çelik	Gençoğlu · Çelik	3:15
11.	"Metelik"	Gençoğlu · İlker Kaleli	Gençoğlu · Kaleli	3:58
12.	"Öpücük ve Kurabiye"	Cudi Genç · Sibel Gürsoy · Gençoğlu	Genç · Gürsoy · Gençoğlu	2:59
13.	"Mektup"	Gençoğlu · Kerem Türkaydın	Gençoğlu · Türkaydın	3:42
14.	"Altango"	Gençoğlu · Efe Bahadır	Gençoğlu · Bahadır	3:46
15.	"Yolcudur Abbas"	Gençoğlu	Çelik	2:19
Total length:				49:28

== Personnel ==
- Gürsel Çelik - arrangement (tracks 1, 3–10, 12, 13, 15)
- Özgür Yurtoğlu - mastering, mixing (tracks 3, 4, 5, 7, 8, 9, 10)
- İlker Kaleli - advisor (tracks 1, 15)
- Serhan Yasdıman - guitar (tracks 1, 8, 9)
- Derin Bayhan - mixing (tracks 1, 15), recording (tracks 1, 3, 4, 7, 8, 9, 10, 12, 13, 15), drums (track 1)
- Can Şeren - recording (tracks 1, 3, 4, 7, 8, 9, 10, 12, 13, 15)
- Arzu Alsan - vocals recording (tracks 1, 3, 5, 15), mixing (tracks 2, 6, 11, 12, 13, 14)
- Kerem Türkaydın - arrangement (track 2), guitar (track 2)
- Cudi Genç - bass (track 2)
- Alpdoğan Türeci - drums (tracks 2, 14)
- Burak Erkul - electric piano (track 2), harmonization (track 6), arrangement (track 14), piano (track 14)
- Cengiz Ercümer - percussion (tracks 2, 4, 9, 14)
- Volkan Cebeci - drums and percussion recording (track 2)
- Hasan Gözetlik - trumpet (track 2), trombone (track 2), flugelhorn
- İlter Kurcala - guitar (tracks 3, 5, 10, 13)
- İstanbul Strings - strings (tracks 3, 4, 5, 6, 7, 8)
- Caner Üstündağ - bass (tracks 4, 7, 9)
- Gültekin Kaçar - guitar (tracks 4, 6, 7, 12)
- Selim Boyacı - oud (tracks 4, 5, 9, 13, 15), bouzouki (tracks 13, 15)
- Ünal Aşkın - recording (tracks 4, 8)
- Mehmet Akatay - percussion (tracks 5, 8, 10)
- Aslıhan And - flute (track 6)
- Seher Karabiber - flute (track 6)
- Altuğ Tekin - French horn (track 6)
- Enç Coşkun - French horn (track 6)
- Kübra Çadırcıoğlu Uyar - French horn (track 6)
- Sertan Sancar - French horn (track 6)
- Efe Bahadır - guitar (track 6)
- Arıkan Sırakaya - drums (track 7)
- Meriç Memikoğlu - drums recording (track 7)
- Göksel Çelik - kanun (track 8)
- Özdemir Güz - oud (track 8)
- Serhat Şensesli - bass (track 10)
- Deniz Ilgar - vocals recording (track 10)
- Cenk Erdoğan - arrangement (track 11), guitar (track 11)
- Ergün Şenlendirici - clarinet (track 11)
- Kaan Yıldız - contrabass (track 14)
- Semih Çelikel - violin (tracks 14, 15)
- Emre Ünal - photographer
- Murat Yalçın - cover design
- Hande Kızıl - styling
- İbrahim Zengin - hair
- Hakan Kültür - make up

== Release history ==
Country	Date	Format(s)	Label
Turkey	20 May 2022	Digital download	Sony
Turkey	25 July 2022	CD	Sony
Worldwide	20 May 2022	Digital download	Sony
