= Kenan Doğulu =

Turkish pop musician

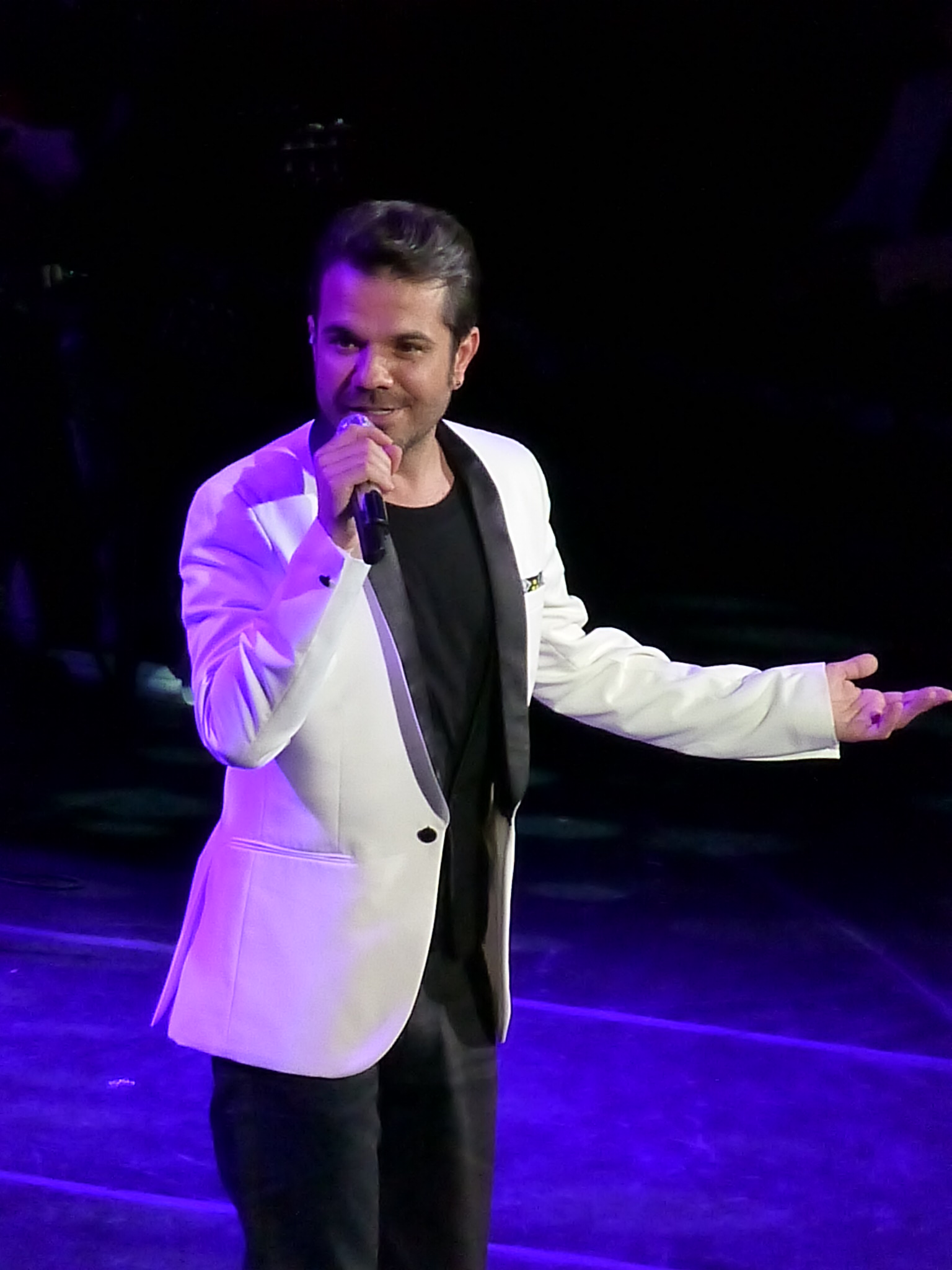
- Kenan Doğulu in 2012
- Born: Kenan Doğulu; 31 May 1974 (age 52); Istanbul, Turkey
- Occupations: Singer-songwriter; composer; producer
- Spouse: Beren Saat (m. 2014)
- Relatives: Ozan Doğulu (brother)
- Musical career
- Genres: Pop; R&B
- Instruments: Vocals; guitar; piano; flute; drums; saxophone
- Years active: 1993–present
- Labels: Bayşu Müzik; Bay Müzik; Raks Müzik; Şahin Özer; Doğulu Productions; DMC
- Website: kenandogulu.com.tr

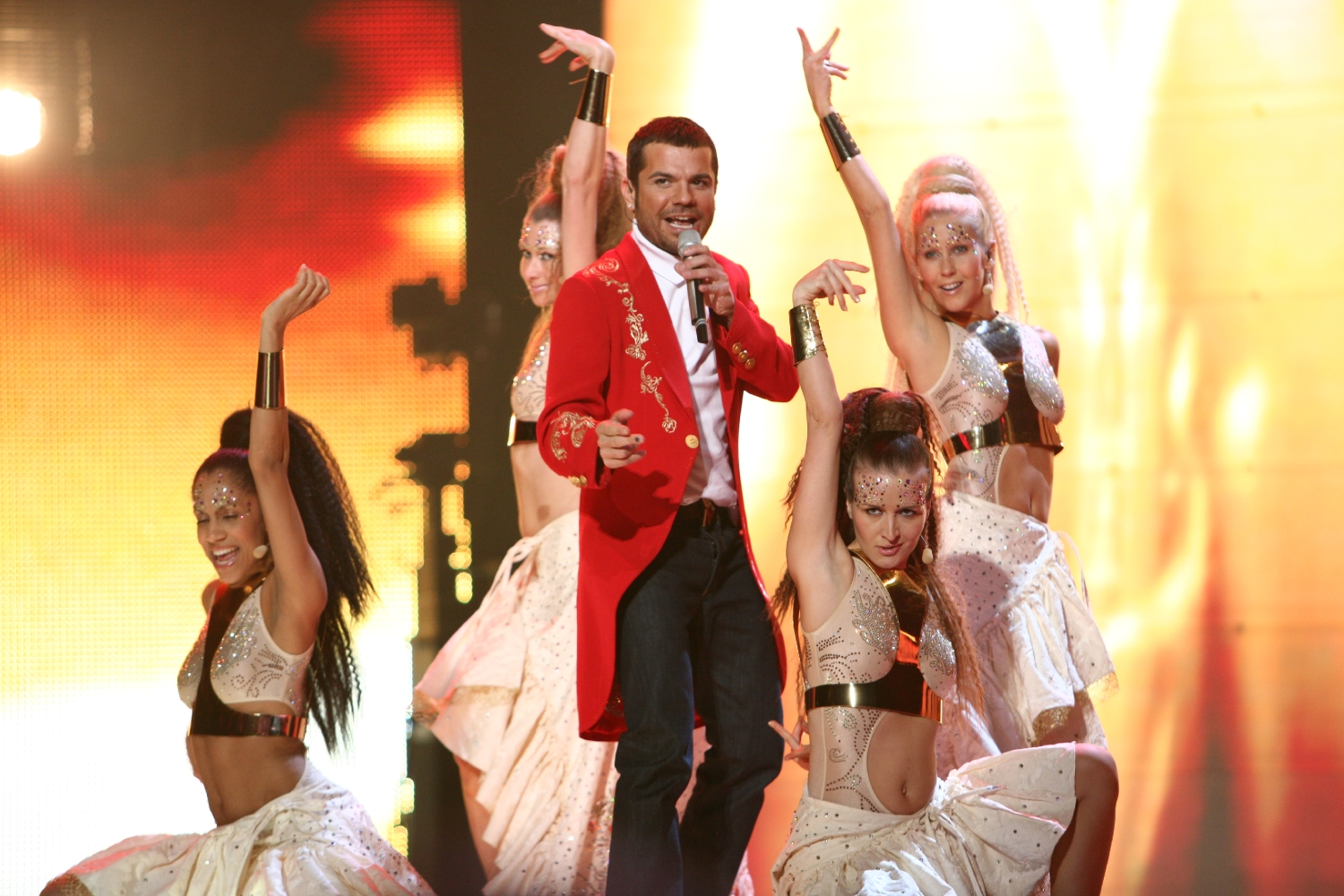
Kenan Doğulu in the Eurovision Song Contest 2007

Kenan Doğulu (Turkish pronunciation: [ceˈnan doˈuɫu]; born 31 May 1974) is a Turkish pop musician. He represented Turkey at the Eurovision Song Contest 2007 in Helsinki, where he was placed fourth, with 163 points. In the summer of 2006, Doğulu released the album Festival, containing the hit single "Çakkıdı", in collaboration with Sezen Aksu.

== Personal life ==
His father is musician Yurdaer Doğulu. His brother is musician Ozan Doğulu. His sister, Cenan Doğulu, is a fashion designer. He stated in an interview that "My grandfather is from Antep. My father is from Adana. In the past, Everyone who came from east is called "Doğulu". My name "Kenan" means Canaan country."

Kenan Doğulu began dating actress Beren Saat in February 2012. Doğulu and Saat became engaged on 23 February 2014 in Istanbul and were married on 29 July 2014 in a private ceremony in Los Angeles, United States.

== Education ==
At the age of five, Doğulu joined the piano department of the conservatory with first place. He studied piano for six years, took flute lessons from his teacher Erkan Alpay and guitar lessons from Erdem Sökmen. Meanwhile, he continued his education in theater, soloist in a children's choir, and rhythm instruments.

He completed his high school education at Kültür College. He completed the “Communication” certificate program at Hesser College, New Hampshire, USA. Then, he started study at the L.A. Musicians Institute. He then continued in Turkey, at Istanbul Bilgi University.

== Discography ==
=== Studio albums ===
List of albums, sales figures and certifications
Album	Released	Label	Format	Certifications	Sales
Yaparım Bilirsin (You Know I'll Do It)	8 July 1993 (TR)	Esen Müzik	Cassette		
Sımsıkı Sıkı Sıkı (Tight, Very Tight)	17 December 1994 (TR)	Esen Müzik	Cassette		
Kenan Doğulu 3	17 August 1996 (TR)	Raks Müzik	Cassette		
Ben Senin Herşeyinim (I'm Your Everything)	12 August 1999 (TR)	Esen Müzik	Cassette		
Ex Aşkım (My Ex-Lover)	25 July 2001 (TR)	Esen Müzik	CD, cassette, digital download		
Demedi Deme (Don't Tell Me I Didn't Tell You)	30 June 2003	DMC	CD, cassette, digital download	MÜ-YAP: Diamond	Turkey: 300,000
Festival	Released: 19 June 2006 (TR)	DMC	CD, cassette, digital download	MÜ-YAP: Platinum	Turkey: 265,500
Patron	4 June 2009 (TR)	DMC, Doğulu Productions	CD, digital download		Turkey: 94,983
Aşka Türlü Şeyler (Various Kinds of Love)	6 July 2012 (TR)	Doğulu Productions	CD, digital download		Turkey: 60,000
Vay Be (Wow)	20 July 2018 (TR)	Doğulu Productions	CD, digital download		

=== Compilation albums ===
List of albums
Album	Information
The King of Turkish Pop	Released: 17 August 2009 (TR); Label: Esen Müzik; Format: CD, digital download
İhtimaller (Possibilities)	Released: 24 June 2016 (TR); Label: Doğulu Productions; Format: CD, digital download

=== Remix albums ===
List of albums
Album	Information
3,5	Released: 26 April 1997 (TR); Label: Şahin Özer Müzik; Format: CD, digital download
5,5	Released: 8 October 2002 (TR); Label: DMC; Format: CD, digital download
6,5	Released: 14 July 2004 (TR); Label: DMC; Format: CD, digital download
7,5	Released: 22 August 2007 (TR); Label: DMC; Format: CD, digital download

=== Split albums ===
List of albums
Album	Information
Festival 2009 (with Ceza and Pinhani)	Released: 26 June 2009 (TR); Label: Pasaj Müzik; Format: CD, digital download

=== EPs ===
List of EPs
EP	Information
Hayal Kahramanım (My Imaginary Hero)	Released: 1 April 2008 (TR); Label: Doğulu Productions; Format: CD, digital download

=== Singles ===
List of singles
Single	Released	Label	Format
Gençlik Marşı (March of Youth)	15 March 1999 (TR)	Bay Müzik	CD, digital download
Şans Meleğim (My Angel of Fortune)	Released: 28 June 2011 (TR)	DMC	CD, digital download
Kız Sana Hayran (The Girl Admires You) (feat. Ozan Doğulu)	30 July 2013 (TR)	DMC, Doğulu Productions	CD, digital download
Aşk İle Yap (Do It With Love)	30 July 2013 (TR)	DMC, Doğulu Productions	CD, digital download
İlk Adımı Sen At (You Take the First Step)	23 April 2017 (TR)	Doğulu Productions	CD, digital download
Bizimdir (It's Ours)	17 April 2020 (TR)	Doğulu Productions	Digital download
Bumaya	20 August 2021 (TR)	Doğulu Ses	Digital download
Hezarfen (Polymath) (feat. Erdem Kınay)	27 December 2021 (TR)	DMC	Digital download
Sonsuza Dek (Forevermore)	22 April 2022 (TR)	Doğulu Music	Digital download
What's Love (feat. Ege Çubukçu)	7 October 2022 (TR)	Şifne Vibes	Digital download
Rüya (Dream) (feat. Arem Özgüç & Arman Aydın)	13 October 2023 (TR)	HVSTLE	Digital download

=== Charts ===
List of singles, release date and album name
Single	Year	Peak	Album
Single	Year	TR	Album
"Çakkıdı"	2006	1	Festival
"Baş Harfi Ben"	2006	2	Festival
"Yüzsüz Yürek"	2006	5	Festival
"Aşk Kokusu"	2007	9	Festival
"...Dan Sonra" (duet with Sıla)	2007	1	Sıla
"Shake It Up Şekerim"	2007	—	Shake It Up Şekerim
"Ara Beni Lütfen"	2008	6	Festival
"Rüzgar"	2008	—	Festival
"Olmaz"	2009	—	Festival
"Rütbeni Bileceksin"	2009	2	Patron
"Aşkkolik"	2009	—	Patron
"Beyaz Yalan"	2009	13	Patron
"Anlıyor musun ?"	2010	—	Patron
"En Kıymetlim"	2010	—	Patron
"Şans Meleğim"	2011	—	Şans Meleğim
"Şeytan Tüyü"	2012	—	Aşka Türlü Şeyler
"Aşka Türlü Şeyler"	2013	—	Aşka Türlü Şeyler
"Kız Sana Hayran" (feat. Ozan Doğulu)	2013	3	Kız Sana Hayran
"Rica"	2014	—	Aşka Türlü Şeyler
"Harika" (feat. Ozan Doğulu & Ajda Pekkan)	2014	—	130 Bpm Moderato
"Aşk İle Yap"	2015	—	Aşk İle Yap
"Bir İleri İki Geri"	2015	—	Aşka Türlü Şeyler
"—" indicates that the songs were not included in the lists or the results were not disclosed.

Awards and achievements
Preceded by Sibel Tüzün with "Süper Star"	Turkey in the Eurovision Song Contest; 2007	Succeeded by Mor ve Ötesi with "Deli"
