= Olmaz Olsun =

1976 single by Sezen Aksu

Single by Sezen Aksu
- Released: 1976
- Genre: Pop

"Olmaz Olsun" is Turkish singer Sezen Aksu's third single, released in 1976. It reached number 1 on the charts.

After the release of her first two singles "Haydi Şansım" and "Kusura Bakma", Aksu grew frustrated at the songs presented to her by her record label Hop. She decided to write the two songs "Olmaz Olsun" and "Seni Gidi Vurdumduymaz" which Hop agreed to release as her third single. "Olmaz Olsun" has orchestration by Şanar Yurdatapan and "Seni Gidi Vurdumduymaz" was arranged by Attila Özdemiroğlu.

In the Turkish magazine Hey, an anonymous reviewer called the songs "cute" and rated the single 3 out of 5.

"Olmaz Olsun" and ""Seni Gidi Vurdumduymaz" were included on Aksu's first album Allahaısmarladık, which was released by Hop in 1977.

== Track listing ==
No.	Title	Writer(s)	Composer (s)	Length
1.	"Olmaz Olsun"	Sezen Aksu	Sezen Aksu
2.	"Seni Gidi Vurdumduymaz"	Sezen Aksu	Attila Özdemiroğlu
