= Festival (Kenan Doğulu album) =

Studio album by Kenan Doğulu
- Released: 13 June 2006
- Recorded: November 2005–April 2006
- Genre: R&B; pop
- Label: DMC

Kenan Doğulu chronology
| 6.5 (2004) | Festival (2006) | Patron (2009) |

Festival is the seventh studio album by the Turkish musician Kenan Doğulu. It reached commercial success in Turkey thanks to its hit single "Çakkıdı".

== Track listing ==
1. "Aşk Tanrısı" (writer-composer: Kenan Doğulu) - 1:53
2. "Aşk Kokusu" (writer-composer: Kenan Doğulu) - 4:38
3. "Çakkıdı" (writer-composer: Sezen Aksu) - 3:18
4. "Rahatla" (writer: Kenan Doğulu, composer: Kenan Doğulu, Marshall Curtly) - 2:52
5. "Rüzgar" (writer-composer: Kenan Doğulu) - 3:22
6. "Olmaz" (writer-composer: Kenan Doğulu) - 3:33
7. "Baş Harfi Ben" (writer-composer: Kenan Doğulu) - 3:35
8. "Ayışığı" (writer-composer: Kenan Doğulu) - 3:49
9. "Ara Beni Lütfen" (writer-composer: Kenan Doğulu) - 4:39
10. "Yüzsüz Yürek" (writer-composer: Kenan Doğulu) - 3:20
11. "Haykırış" (writer: Zeki Uluruh, composer: Yurdaer Doğulu) - 4:15
12. "Unutarak Kurtuluyorum" - 3:05
13. "Nereye Kadar" (writer: Kenan Doğulu, composer: Ozan Doğulu) - 4:36
14. "Aşk Kokusu" (Radio Mix) (writer-composer: Kenan Doğulu) - 6:58
15. "Aşk Kokusu" (Video Clip Version) - 4:33

== Charts ==
| Album | Song | Peak |
| Album | Song | TR |
|---|---|---|
| Festival | "Çakkıdı" | 1 |
| Festival | "Baş Harfi Ben" | 1 |
| Festival | "Yüzsüz Yürek" | 8 |
| Festival | "Rüzgar" | 14 |
| Festival | "Aşk Kokusu" | 9 |
| Festival | "Ara Beni Lütfen" | 3 |
| Festival | "Olmaz" | 2 |
