= Vaveyla =

Studio album by Sıla
- Released: 9 October 2012
- Genre: Pop
- Label: Sony · Columbia
- Producer: Sıla Gençoğlu · Efe Bahadır

Sıla chronology
Joker (2012)	Vaveyla (2012)	Yeni Ay (2014)

Vaveyla (Squall) is the fifth studio album by Turkish singer Sıla. It was released by Sony Music Entertainment and Columbia Records on 9 October 2012.

== Release and content ==
Vaveyla was released with two different versions and contains 13 songs in total. Unlike Sıla's previous albums, only live instruments are used in this album. Vaveyla was recorded in Babajim studios, and Tom Coyne did its audio mastering. All of the string records in the album were performed by Bratislava Symphony Orchestra.

The album's lead single, "İmkansız", was first released on 2 October 2012 on Turkcell's music platform, turkcellmuzik.com.tr.

== Track listing ==
1. "Çocuk" (writer: Sıla, composer: Sıla & Efe Bahadır) – 3:37
2. "Her Şey Yolunda" (writer: Sıla, composer: Efe Bahadır) – 3:47
3. "Açık Deniz" (writer: Sıla, composer: Sıla & Efe Bahadır) – 3:43
4. "İmkansız" (writer: Sıla, composer: Sıla & Efe Bahadır) – 3:47
5. "Panik Atak" (writer: Sıla, composet: Kerem Türkaydın) – 3:28
6. "Hala" (writer: Sıla, composer: Efe Bahadır) – 4:19
7. "Esaret" (writer: Sıla, composer: Efe Bahadır) – 2:57
8. "Zor Sevdiğimden" (writer-composer: Sıla) – 3:34
9. "Leyla" (writer: Sıla, composer: Sıla & Efe Bahadır) – 3:06
10. "Issız Ada" (writer: Sıla, composer: Kerem Türkaydın) – 3:22
11. "Aslan Gibi" (writer: Sıla, composer: Sezen Aksu) – 3:54
12. "(K)açık Deniz" (writer: Sıla, composer: Sıla & Efe Bahadır) – 3:45
13. "(C)esaret" (writer: Sıla, composer: Efe Bahadır) – 3:23

== Chart positions ==
Album	Single	Peak position
Album	Single	Turkey
Vaveyla	"İmkansız"	2

== Sales ==
Country	Sales
Turkey (MÜ-YAP)	84,000
