= Sıla (album) =

Studio album by Sıla
- Released: 23 October 2007
- Genre: Pop, electronic
- Length: 61:07
- Label: Sony BMG
- Producer: Ozan Doğulu

Sıla chronology
Sıla (2007)	Shaker (2008)

Singles from Sıla
- 1. "...Dan Sonra" Released: 20 September 2007; 2. "Kenar Süsü" Released: 6 March 2008

Sıla is the self-titled debut album of Turkish artist Sıla. It was released by Sony BMG in Turkey. The album consists of 14 tracks and an official remix, produced by Ozan Doğulu and featuring Kenan Doğulu, Sezen Aksu, Yalın, Efe Bahadır, Murat Yeter and Mustafa Ceceli as lyric writers and instrumentalists.

The album's first single, "...Dan Sonra", is a duet with Kenan Doğulu who previously represented Turkey in the Eurovision Song Contest 2007, winning Turkey 4th place. Sıla was a back-up vocalist for Kenan Doğulu for 7 years. "...Dan Sonra" reached the top of the Turkish Charts, remaining there for 12 weeks, while reaching 79th place in European Charts, with the official video directed by Murad Küçük.

The album's 2nd single, Kenar Süsü, reached 2nd place in the official Turkish chart and was released along with a music video directed by Murad Küçük. In interviews, Sıla expressed that she chose the slow hit Kenar Süsü in order to break all the rules against the first single's rebellious, wild mood, and to showcase the album's different styles.

== Track listing ==
1. "Kenar Süsü" (Sıla) – 4:12
2. "Cebren Ve Hile İle" (Sıla) – 3:19
3. "Malum" (Sıla, Efe Bahadır & Sıla) – 4:58
4. "Uşak Makamı" (Sıla, Efe Bahadır & Sıla) – 4:17
5. "Bıktım" (Sıla) – 3:37
6. "...Dan Sonra" (Sıla, Ozan Doğulu) – 3:39
7. "Ne Desem İnanırsın" (Sıla, Yalın & Efe Bahadır & Sıla) – 3:55
8. "Egeli Lodos" (Sıla) – 3:35
9. "Dön Demeyi Unuttum" (Sıla, Yalın) – 3:59
10. "Köşe Yastığı" (Sıla, Efe Bahadır & Sıla) – 5:14
11. "Özledim Onu" (Sıla & Gözde Kansu, Efe Bahadır & Sıla) – 4:03
12. "Rus Ruleti" (Sıla) – 4:06
13. "Korkma" (Sıla, Efe Bahadır & Sıla) – 4:38
14. "Sıla" (Sıla & Sezen Aksu) – 3:06
15. "Kenar Süsü (Alternative)" (Sıla) – 4:21
