= Bedük =

Turkish musician, producer, and director

Beduk
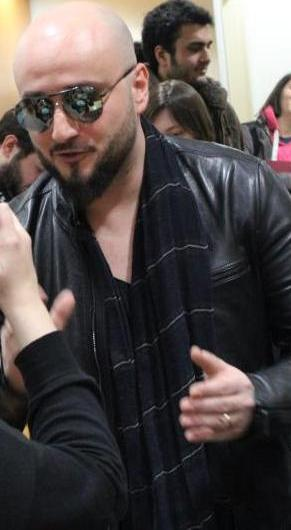
- Bedük at METU (2013)

Background information
- Born: Serhat Bedük; 20 April 1979 (age 47); Ankara, Turkey
- Genre: Electropop
- Occupations: Singer, songwriter, record producer, actor, music video director
- Years active: 2004–present
- Labels: Audiology Records; Sony Music; Columbia Records
- Website: Bedük Official Webpage

Serhat Bedük (born 20 April 1979), better known by his surname Bedük, is a Turkish musician, producer, and director.

Bedük had his debut album Nefes Almak Zor (English: Hard To Breathe) released in 2004 by İrem Records. However, his rise to fame was in 2007 with his second album, Even Better released through Audiology Records. In 2009, he released his third album Dance Revolution and instantly gathered massive attention.

In 2010 he released the album "Go", released through Sony / Columbia Records.

== Career ==
=== Studio albums ===
- 2004: Nefes Almak Zor
- 2007: Even Better
- 2008: Dance Revolution
- 2010: Go
- 2013: Overload
- 2013: On
- 2015: Bi Dans Etsek
- 2018: Flashforward
- 2020: Intergalactic
- 2021: Live in London

=== Remix albums ===
- 2011: Ful
- 2019: Dünya Hep Böyle Dönsün (Remixes)

=== Singles ===
- Gel Aşka - Remixes (2009)
- Halkalı Şeker (2014)
- Missing (2016)
- We Dance (2018)
- Gravity (2018)
- Hayvan (2019)
- Raks (2019)
- Push The Buttton (2020)
- Ankara'nın Delisi (2020)

=== Charts ===
Album	Single	Peak position	
Album	Single	Turkey	Russia
GO	"Electric Girl"	1	280
GO	"This Fire"	—	—

=== Videos ===
Year	Song	Director
2007	"My Woman"	Murad Küçük
2008	"Better Than My Baby"	Murad Küçük
2008	"Heartbreaker"	Taylan Mutaf
2009	"Automatik"	Murad Küçük
2009	"Gel Aşka"	Murad Küçük
2009	"Too Shy"	Live Footage
2010	"Electric Girl"	Bertan Basaran
2010	"This Fire"	Bertan Basaran
2011	"Ful Animasyon"	Yalcin Birol
2013	"Koy Ver Kendini"	Bedük
2013	"Benim Gecem"	Bedük
2015	"Oynayalim"	Bedük
2016	"Bi Dans Etsek"	Bedük

=== Awards ===
Year	Award	Category	Verdict
2006	Miller Music Factory	Best Dance Music Producer with "Like Tomorrow Will Never Come"	Won
2007	MTV Europe Music Awards 2007	New Sounds of Europe Turkey	Nominated
2008	Trend Show 2009	Music Trend of 2009	Won
2009	MTV Europe Music Awards 2009	Best European Act Turkey	Nominated
2009	Radio Boğaziçi Awards	Best Electronic Music Artist 2009	Won
2010	Radio Boğaziçi Awards	Best Electronic Music Artist 2010	Won
2010	Radio Boğaziçi Awards	Best Music Video of 2010 (Electric Girl)	Won
2011	24. International Consumer Summit	Best Album (GO)	Won
2011	24. International Consumer Summit	Best Artist	Won
