= Gökhan Keser =

Turkish actor and model

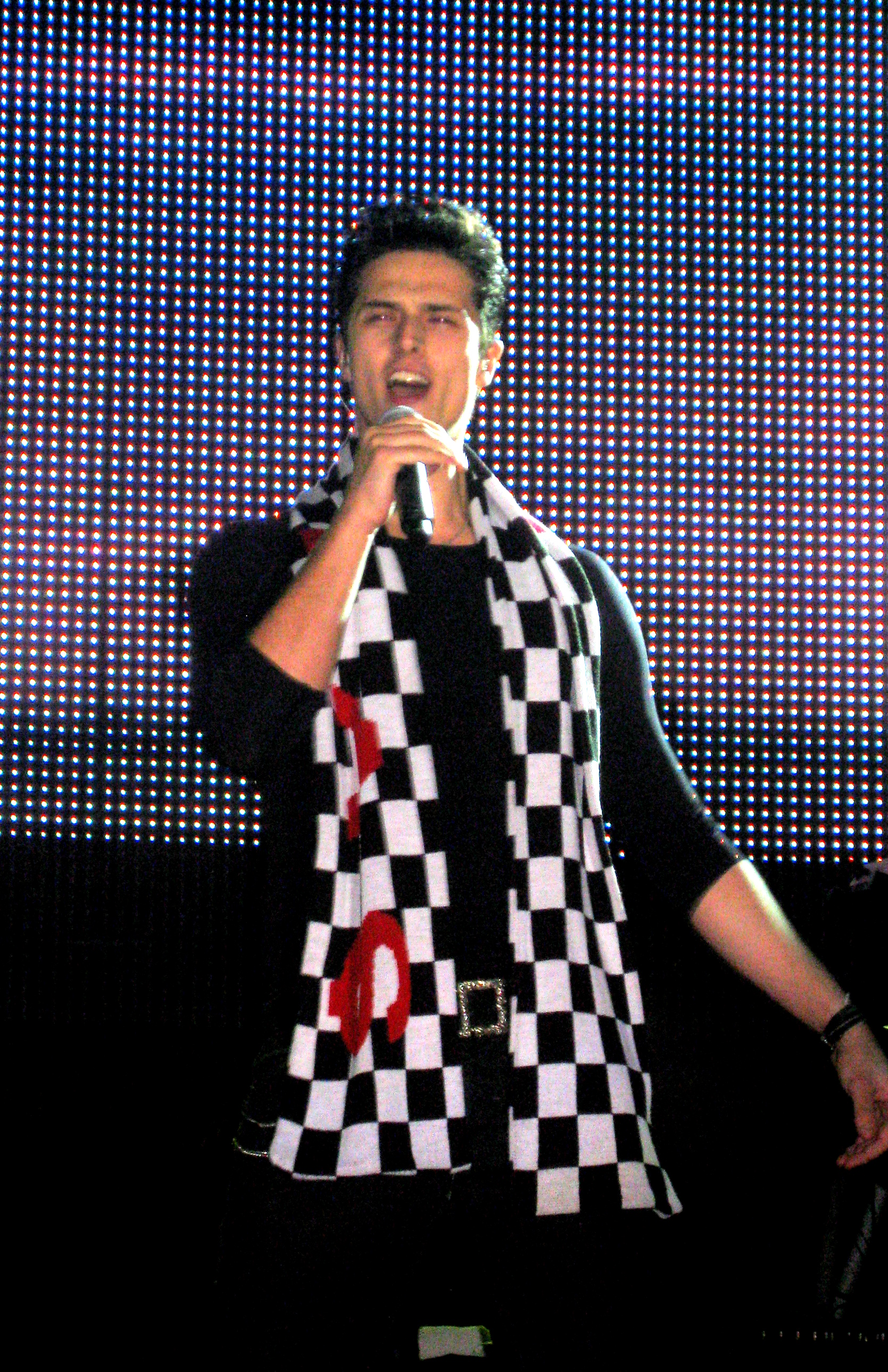
- Born: 9 September 1987 (age 38); İzmir, Turkey
- Occupations: Actor; model (formerly); singer
- Beauty pageant titleholder
- Title: Manhunt International 2006 (Third Runner-up, Mr. Photogenic); Best Model of Turkey (runner up); Miss & Mr Model Ege 2004 (winner)
- Years active: 2004–present

Gökhan Keser (born 9 September 1987) is a Turkish singer, actor, model and producer.

== Modelling career ==
He began his modelling life in 2002. When he placed first in the 'Miss. & Mr. Model' competition he signed to Uğurkan Erez Agency, one of the most prominent casting and modelling agencies in Turkey. He took part in many fashion shows and catalog spreads at home and abroad. In year 2005, Keser participated in 'Best Model Of Turkey and took runner up. which gave him the opportunity to compete in Manhunt International 2006 in China. In a field of 64 international competitors, he got third runner up and the title of 'Mr. Photogenic'.

== Acting career ==
He has taken acting classes from Ayla Algan at Ekol Drama Theatre School.

In 2006, he began acting in the ATV fantasy child series Selena which ran for 3 seasons and 104 episodes. Nowadays, It is in trending list in YouTube.

He played in the film based from life of Atçalı Kel Mehmet. With Hande Subaşı, he played in romantic comedy film Seviyorum Ama Arkadaşça. With Gülçin Ergül, He also did the main male role in the cinema film Kayıp Çocuklar Cenneti by director Mete Özgencil.

Gökhan Keser also featured in Sıla's music videos.

=== Television ===
TV series
| Year | Title | Role | Notes |
|---|---|---|---|
| 2005 | Cennet Mahallesi | Gökhan | Guest appearance |
| 2006–2009 | Selena | Burak Kocataş (Teacher) | Leading role |
| 2015 | Sen Benimsin | Ejder | Leading role |

=== Film ===
Film
| Year | Title | Role | Notes |
|---|---|---|---|
| 2009 | Kayıp Çocuklar Cenneti | | Leading role |
| 2015 | Seviyorum Ama Arkadaşça | Fırat | Leading role |
| 2016 | Cumali Ceber: Allah Seni Alsın | Gökhan | Leading role |
| 2017 | Atçalı Kel Mehmet | Atçalı Kel Mehmet | Leading role |
| 2018 | Tatlı Bela | | Leading role |
| 2021 | Yalancı Sevgilim | Ferit | Leading role |
| 2024 | Asırlık Aşk | Ali Reşat | Leading role |

== Singing career ==
He worked as Sıla's backing vocalist for two years. Keser also started a music career. He signed with Sony Music and released an album with the help of the producer Şehrazat.

=== Albums ===
- Gökhan Keser (2012)

=== Singles ===
- Hadi Oradan (2011)
- Seninle Bozdum (2011)
- Hiç Vaktim Yok (2014)
- Bul Beni (2015)
- Beni Özledin mi (2016)
- Kimi Sevsem Açıldı Kısmeti (2018)
- Yangın (2021)
