= Ozan Doğulu =

Turkish musical artist (born 1972)

- Born: 13 January 1972 (age 54); Istanbul, Turkey
- Genre: Pop
- Occupations: Arranger, composer, record producer
- Instruments: Guitar, piano
- Years active: 1992–present
- Label: DMC
- Website: ozandogulu.com.tr

Ozan Doğulu (born 13 January 1972) is a Turkish singer, composer, music arranger and record producer.

== Life and career ==
Doğulu is the elder brother of Turkish singer Kenan Doğulu and the son of composer Yurdaer Doğulu and his wife Serpil Doğulu. His sister, Canan Doğulu, is a fashion designer. Their family is originally from Gaziantep.

He was the orchestra conductor of Sezen Aksu for a long time, and for the time being, he also contributed to his brother's albums. In addition, he started conducting his own music and worked as a DJ in various venues and events under the "Ozan Doğulu Live Project" initiative. Doğulu started playing piano as a child and joined the band of many artists, including Zeki Müren. He devoted much of his time to playing piano and finished the conservatory with high grades.

On 15 June 2010, his first album 130 Bpm was released by DMC, in which several artists including Sezen Aksu, Tarkan, Kenan Doğulu, Sıla, Ferhat Göçer, Ajda Pekkan, Mustafa Ceceli, Ziynet Sali and Agusev Brass Band performed the songs.

== Discography ==
=== Albums ===
- 130 Bpm (2010)
- 130 Bpm Allegro (2011)
- 130 Bpm Moderato (2014)
- 130 Bpm Forte (2017)
- 130 Bpm Kreşendo (2019)

=== Compilations ===
- 130 Bpm (DJ Eyüp Remixes) (2014)
- 130 Bpm Quartet (2015)

=== Singles ===
- "Dağılmak İstiyorum" (ft. Model) (2012)
- "Uzun Lafın Kısası" (ft. Gülden & Bahadır Tatlıöz) (2016)
- "Kime Ne" (ft. Gökçe) (2016)
- "Wet" (ft. Baby Brown & Ece Seçkin) (2016)
- "Yağmur" (ft. Ziynet Sali) (2016)
- "Öle Öle" (ft. Hera) (2018)
- "Ola Ola" (ft. Ozeus) (2021)
- "Uzun Lafın Kısası 2 (Live Performance)" (with Bahadır Tatlıöz & Gülden) (2022)
- "Bir Kereden Hiçbir Şey Olmaz" (with Gülşen) (2022)
- "Ben de İsterem (İbrahim Erkal Hürmet)" (with Cem Belevi) (2023)
- "100" (2023)
- "Heybeler Bellerde" (2025)
- "İnsan Lekesi" (with Deniz Seki) (2025)
- "Demedim mi" (with Irmak Arıcı) (2025)
