= İmza =

Studio album by Sıla
- Released: 24 March 2009
- Genre: Pop
- Length: 36:39
- Label: Sony BMG

Sıla chronology
Shaker (2008)	İmza (2009)	Konuşmadığımız Şeyler Var (2010)

Singles from İmza
- 1. "Sevişmeden Uyumayalım" Released: 11 March 2009

İmza (Signature) is the second studio album by Turkish singer Sıla. It was released on 24 March 2009 by Sony BMG.

== About the album ==
The album, like its predecessor, was produced by Ozan Doğulu. All of the songs on the album were written by Sıla, and composed by her together with Efe Bahadır. Alongside Ozan Doğulu, Murat Yeter, and Efe Bahadır, a number of other musicians worked with Sıla on the album, including Murat Çekem, Cihan Okan, Fatih Ahıskalı, Erdinç Şenyaylar, Cengiz Ercümer, Ezgi İçellioğlu, Cudi Genç, Kerem Türkaydın, Göksun Çavdar, Opus 34 ve Gündem, and Yaylı Grubu.

== Promotion ==
The song "Sevişmeden Uyumayalım" was chosen as the album's lead single, ranking first on "Türkçe Top 20" and assisting the album in gaining more success. Sıla was later left uncertain about which song she needed to choose for the album's second music video. In an interview with radio programmer Mine Ayman, she said the four songs that were candidates to be turned into music video were "İnşallah", "Bitse de Gitsek", "Masumum" and "Her An Aksilik Çıkabilir". Out of these songs, "İnşallah" entered "Türkçe Top 20" as number nineteen, later rising to the second position on 22 June. Its music video was recorded in May and directed by Spanish director Fernando Vallejo. It was released on 3 June 2009.

== Achievements ==
The album ranked third on D&R Local Album List and was chosen by Power Türk as the "Album of the Week" between 29 March 2009 and 5 April 2009.

The album was ranked third by Hürriyet on its list of "2009's best 10 local albums", and was nominated for the "Best Album" award at the 16th Kral TV Video Music Awards. It received the "Best Album of the Year" award at the 17th Objective Awards.

== Track listing ==
1. "Sevişmeden Uyumayalım" (writer: Sıla, composer: Efe Bahadır & Sıla) – 3:30
2. "Bitse de Gitsek" (writer: Sıla, composer: Efe Bahadır & Sıla) – 3:27
3. "Masumum" (writer: Sıla, composer: Efe Bahadır & Sıla) – 3:25
4. "Yara Bende" (writer: Sıla, composer: Efe Bahadır & Sıla) – 3:56
5. "İnşallah" (writer: Sıla, composer: Efe Bahadır & Sıla) – 3:56
6. "En Doğru Zaman" (writer: Sıla, composer: Efe Bahadır & Sıla) – 4:31
7. "Bana Biraz Renk Ver" (writer: Sıla, composer: Efe Bahadır & Sıla) – 4:12
8. "Her An Aksilik Çıkabilir" (writer: Sıla, composer: Efe Bahadır) – 4:03
9. "Ne Çok" (writer: Sıla, composer: Efe Bahadır & Sıla) – 1:57
10. "Yoruldum" (writer: Sıla, composer: Efe Bahadır & Sıla) – 3:39

== Chart positions ==
Album	Single	Peak position
Album	Single	Turkey
İmza	"Sevişmeden Uyumayalım"	1
İmza	"İnşallah"	2
İmza	"Yara Bende"	4
İmza	"Bana Biraz Renk Ver"	3

== Personnel ==
=== Musicians ===
- Arrangements: Efe Bahadır, Ozan Doğulu, Murat Yeter
- Drums: Murat Yeter
- Bass guitar: Cudi Genç
- Acoustic guitar: Efe Bahadır
- Electric guitar: Kerem Türkaydın, Erdinç Şenyaylar
- Oud, cümbüş, e-bow: Fatih Ahıskalı
- Clarinet: Göksun Çavdar
- Ney: Ercan Irmak
- Keyboard: Ozan Doğulu
- Bowed string instruments: Gündem, Opus 34*
- Percussion: Cengiz Ercümer
- Vocals: Efe Bahadır, Cihan Okan, Murat Çekem, Kenan Doğulu, Ezgi İçellioğlu

=== Production and recording ===
- Production: Sony BMG
- Producer: Ozan Doğulu
- Studio: Doğulu Std.
- Recording-mixing: Arzu Aslan
- Mastering: Çağlar Türkmen
- Photography: Mehmet Turgut
- Graphic design: Arda Aktaş
- Edition: Portal Rights Management
