= Sıla (singer) =

Turkish singer-songwriter (born 1980)

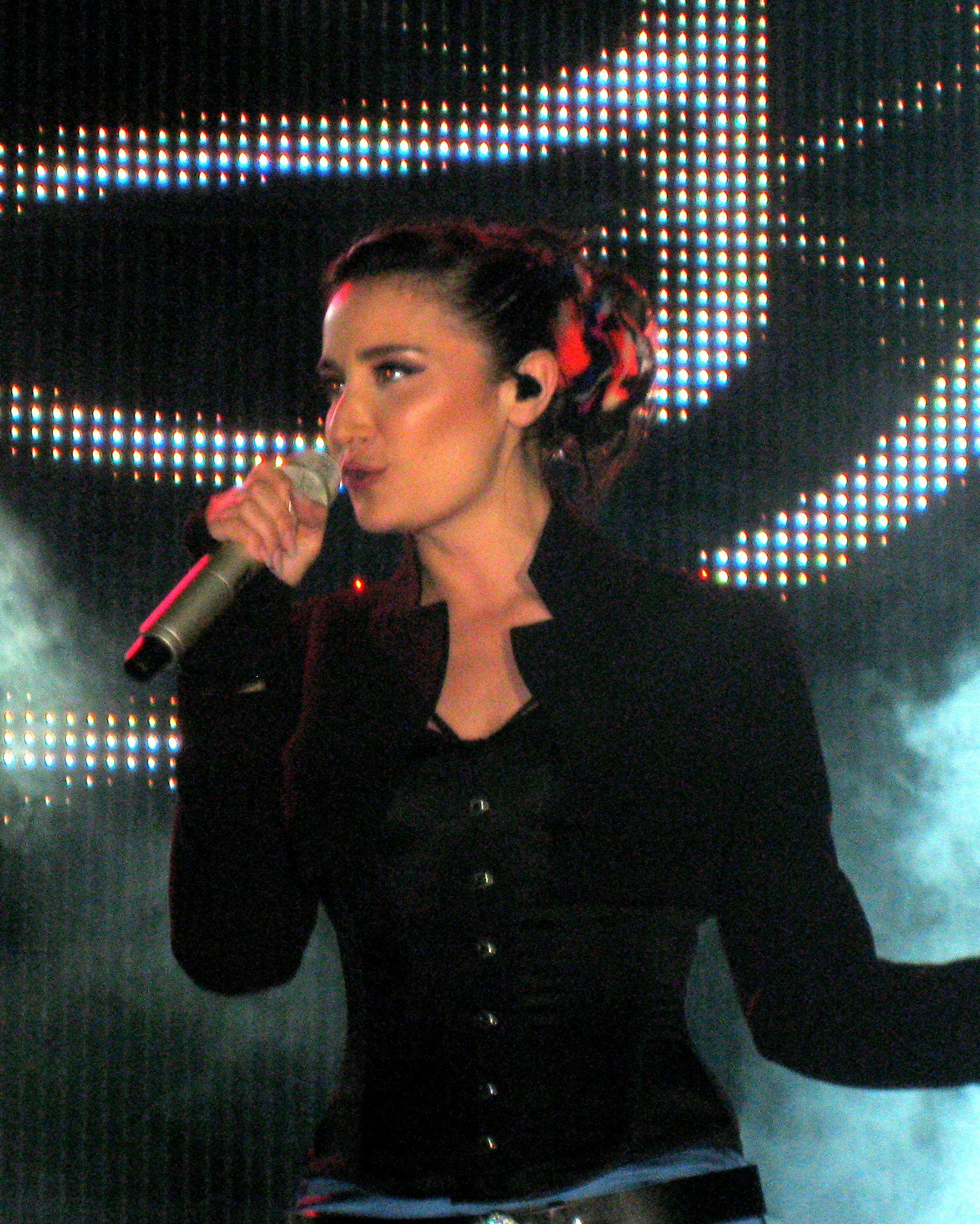
- Sıla in 2011
- Born: Sıla Gençoğlu; 17 June 1980 (age 46); Acıpayam, Denizli, Turkey
- Education: Istanbul University (left); Istanbul Bilgi University
- Occupations: Singer; songwriter; producer
- Spouse: Hazer Amani (m. 2020; div. 2021)
- Musical career
- Genres: Pop; jazz; rock
- Years active: 2007–present
- Label: Columbia · Epic · Sony
- Website: www.silagencoglu.com

Sıla Gençoğlu (born 17 June 1980) is a Turkish singer-songwriter. She was born in Acıpayam, Denizli, and later moved to İzmir and then to Istanbul to finish her studies. She started to learn performing arts at high school. After studying jazz at Istanbul Bilgi University, she became a backing vocalist for Kenan Doğulu.

Sıla released her self-titled debut album in 2007. The song "...Dan Sonra" became a number-one hit on Türkçe Top 20, and after critical and commercial success she released the albums İmza (2009), Konuşmadığımız Şeyler Var (2010), Vaveyla (2012), Yeni Ay (2014) and Mürekkep (2016) all of which were praised by fans and critics alike. A number of songs in these albums, including "Sevişmeden Uyumayalım", "Acısa da Öldürmez", "Kafa", "Boş Yere", "Vaziyetler", "Yabancı" and "Hediye", became number-one hits in Turkey. The songs "Yoruldum", "İmkânsız" and "Zor Sevdiğimden" ranked among the top five on Turkey's music charts.

In addition to her career as a singer, Sıla, who is famous as a songwriter and composer and has been praised by critics, has written almost all of her songs on her own together with Efe Bahadır. She has also written many songs for other singers. With the release of Konuşmadığımız Şeyler Var and Yeni Ay she became the best-selling artist in Turkey in 2010 and 2014 respectively. She has won four Golden Butterfly Awards and seven Turkey Music Awards, and has received numerous nominations.

== Life and career ==
=== 1980–2006: Early life and career beginnings ===
Sıla Gençoğlu was born on 17 June 1980 in Denizli, Turkey. Her mother is from İzmir while her father is from Denizli. Her mother Ömür Gençoğlu (née Balaban) was a pharmacist and her father Şükrü Gençoğlu was a politician and chemist. The couple had become engaged in 1973 and married in 1975. In the mid-1990s, Şükrü Gençoğlu became a candidate for Denizli provincial presidency representing the True Path Party but he later resigned and left the competition. Sıla's maternal grandfather Muzaffer Fikri Balaban was one of the parliamentarians of the 10th Parliament of Turkey representing Democratic Party in the Turkish Grand National Assembly and was sentenced to two and a half years imprisonment following the 1960 Turkish coup d'état. Her paternal grandfather Rıza Gençoğlu was a Justice Party MP in the 15th Parliament of Turkey. After completing her primary school in Denizli she became passionate in learning French, and settled in İzmir with her grandmother, Süheyla Balaban, to attend secondary school. In 1990, she got enrolled in Tevfik Fikret Schools to study French and remained there until 1997. There, her music teacher, Aziz Pelen, recognized Sıla's interest in music and made her appear on stage in school choruses and programs. At the second and third grades of high school she began to take private singing lessons. She also had voice training with Sabahat Tekebaş from the İzmir State Opera and Ballet.

In 1998, she came to Istanbul for higher education. She studied French and literature at the Istanbul University Faculty of Letters for one year, before transferring to Istanbul Bilgi University to study jazz music. During this period, she became a soloist in the jazz orchestra of Neşet Ruacan, Nedim Ruacan and Nezih Yeşilnil at the Afyon Jazz Festival. She worked on her voice with Nükhet Ruacan and also met with musician Efe Bahadır, who made important contributions to her future albums. After a short training, she met Kenan Doğulu and performed as his backing vocalist for seven years. In addition, Sıla's compositions and song lyrics were featured on the albums of many famous artists such as Ferhat Göçer, Kenan Doğulu and Emel Müftüoğlu. People got familiar with her voice for the first time due to her collaboration with Sezen Aksu in the song "Sıla-Töre" for the TV series Sıla.

=== 2007–09: Sıla and İmza ===
In 2007, Sıla released her self-titled debut album which featured a number artists, including Sezen Aksu, Kenan Doğulu, Ozan Doğulu, Yalın and Efe Bahadır. Its lead single "...Dan Sonra" became a number-one hit in Turkey for 12 weeks. A music video was also made for the song "Kenar Süsü". In 2008, she recorded the song "Yaz Geliyor Heyoo" with the group Ciclon. The song was included in their album Shaker and ranked 34th on Turkey's music charts.

Sıla's second studio album, İmza, was released in 2009 and its lead single "Sevişmeden Uyumayalım" became a number-one hit in Turkey for three weeks. Another song from the album titled "İnşallah" ranked number two on Turkey's music charts. Kemal Doğulu directed the music video for "Yara Bende" and the song became number-four on the music charts. A fourth music video was made for the song "Bana Biraz Renk Ver", using footage from Sıla's concert in March 2010, and the song eventually ranked third on Turkey's music charts.

=== 2010–13: Konuşmadığımız Şeyler Var and Vaveyla ===
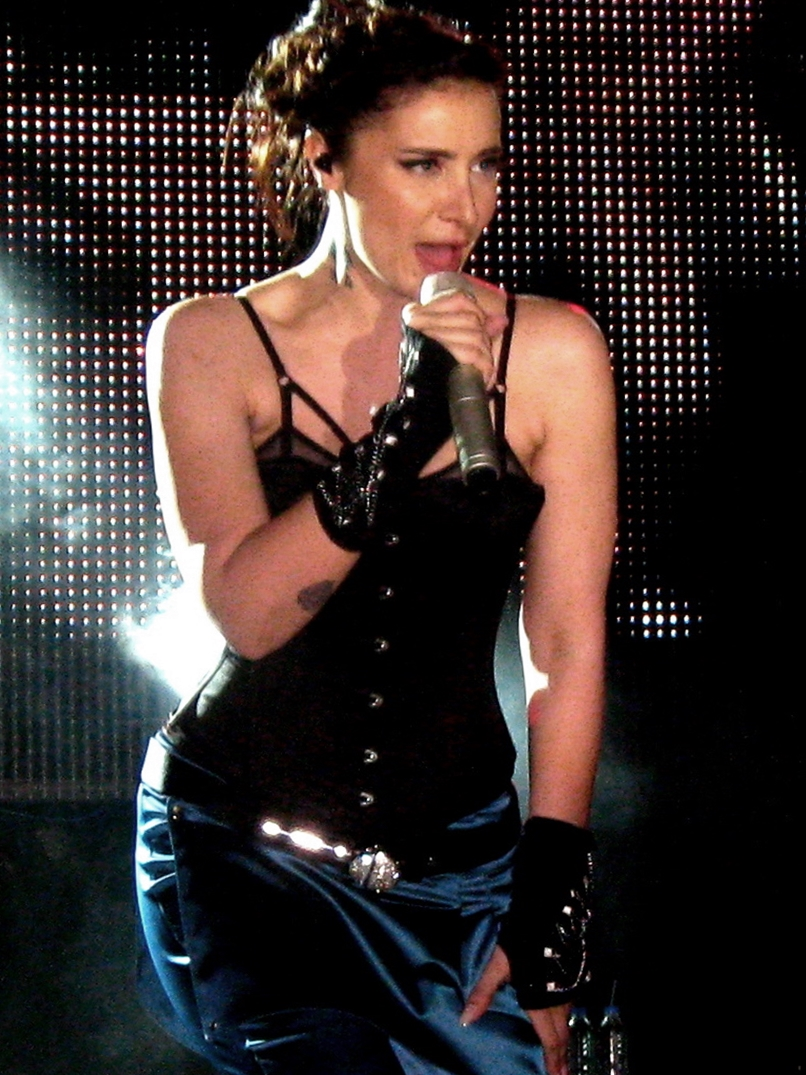
Sıla at Bahçeşehir University Spring Fest in Istanbul, 2011

In June 2010 Sıla was among the artists who were featured on Ozan Doğulu's album 130 Bpm and their song "Alain Delon" became a number-one hit in Turkey. In November 2010, Sıla's third studio album Konuşmadığımız Şeyler Var was released by Sony Music Entertainment and Columbia Records. The album was on top of D&R's Best Sellers List for about a year, and sold 100,000 copies in Turkey making Sıla the seventh best-selling artist in 2010. Güneri Cıvaoğlu, from Milliyet, praised the songs in the album pointing out "the French chanson and colors of Portuguese fado" in it. The songs from the album, for which music videos were made, ranked among the top hits on Turkey's official music charts. The lead single "Acısa da Öldürmez" became a number-one hit for eight continuous weeks followed by "Kafa" and "Boş Yere", both of which topped the charts for three and four weeks respectively. The second song to get a music video was "Oluruna Bırak" and it ranked number two on the music charts. In 2011 Sıla was nominated as the Best Female Artist at the 17th Turkey Music Awards, while her song "Acısa da Öldürmez" received two nominations at the Best Song and Best Lyrics. The album Konuşmadığımız Şeyler Var was also nominated in the category Album of the Year.

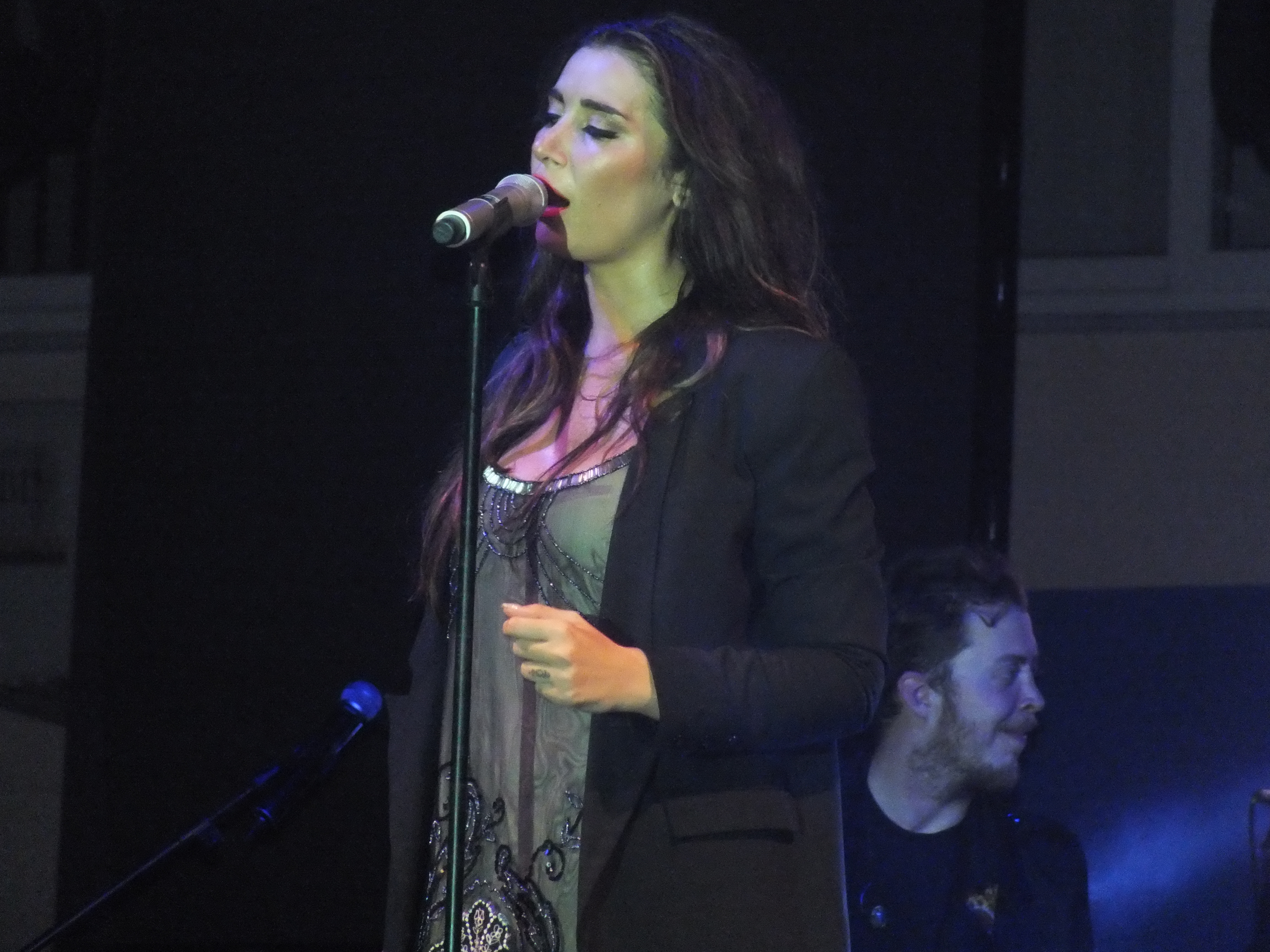
Sıla performing at a concert in Mersin in 2012

For her first live album Joker, which was released in June 2012, she rerecorded the songs from her previous albums. The song "Yoruldum" from this album ranked number two on Turkey's music charts. In October, Sıla released her fourth studio album Vaveyla. Separate music videos were made for the songs "İmkânsız" and "Zor Sevdiğimden", both of which ranked number two on the music charts.

=== 2014–present: Yeni Ay and Mürekkep ===
In October 2013, Sıla revealed that she had started working on her fifth album and the following month she began recording the songs. A two-disc album titled Yeni Ay was released in February 2014 by Sony Music Entertainment and Columbia Records, and on its first week it sold 70,000 copies in Turkey, becoming number one on D&R's Best Selling List. By the end of the year the album sold 158,000 copies in Turkey making Sıla the best-selling artist in 2014. Yeni Ay also broke the record of sales on iTunes Store in Turkey, being the number-one best selling album for several months. Most of the music critics liked the album and Hikmet Demirkol of Hürriyet described it as "an album full of surprises, an album with detail and content that will make the fans happy". The album's lead single "Vaziyetler" was the number-one hit on Türkçe Top 20 for eleven weeks, while two other songs from the album, "Yabancı" and "Hediye", became number-one hits as well. "Reverans" ranked number two on the music charts. At the 2014 Turkey Music Awards, Yeni Ay was chosen as the Best Album, while Sıla won the award for Best Female Artist and was honored as the artist with the most songs played on radio.

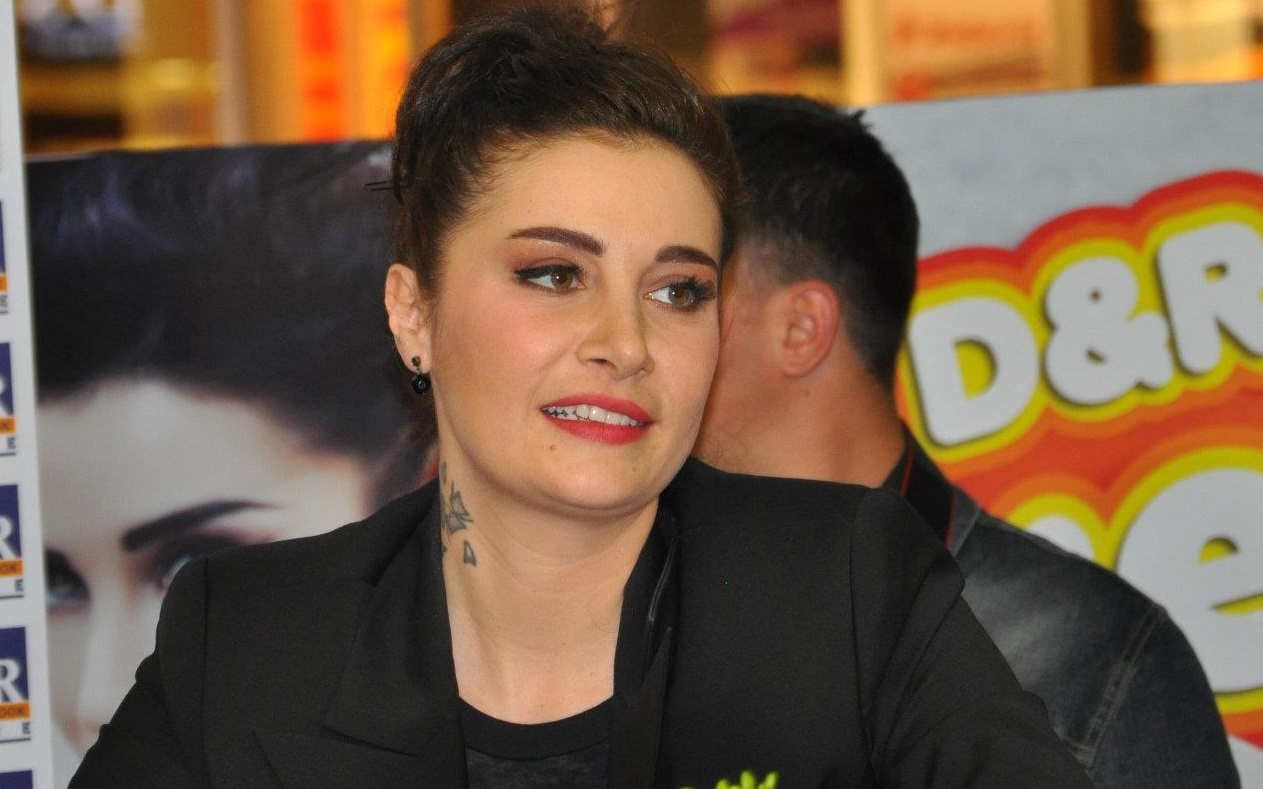
Sıla in Antalya in May 2015

In May 2015, Sıla played in a commercial ad for Coca-Cola with Özcan Deniz and received ₺700,000. The two sang a Turkish version of the song "Why This Kolaveri Di" at a beach but the new arrangement of the lyrics of the song brought negative reviews from the critics. In the same year, Sıla wrote many new songs for Ziynet Sali's album No 6 and Güliz Ayla's first studio album; she also acted as a music director for Ziynet Sali and became a producer for Güliz Ayla. At the end of the year Sıla was chosen as Woman of the Year by GQ Turkey. Preparing her new album took about two years and the songs were recorded over the course of 6 months. Eventually her sixth studio album Mürekkep was released in May 2016 by Sony Music Entertainment and Columbia Records, with "Afitap" and "Engerek" being the first two songs from the album to get music videos. Just like her previous albums, Mürekkep also became the number-one best-selling album in Turkey. The album sold 101,000 copies in the first year of its release. Yavuz Hakan Tok of Milliyet Sanat described it as "one of the best albums of Sıla", pointing out her use of Arabic and Ottoman words in the lyrics of her songs. Sıla was also among the artists who were featured in Erol Evgin's album Altın Düetler in May, singing the song "Ateşle Oynama" together with Evgin.

Following the 2016 Turkish coup d'état attempt, the ruling party of Justice and Development organized a meeting on 7 August with the support of Republican People's Party and Nationalist Movement Party, called the Democracy and Martyr's Meeting, asking famous people to show their support for the government. Sıla refused to attend saying: "I am absolutely against the coup, but I do not prefer to be in such a show." As a result, her concerts in municipalities controlled by the Justice and Development Party were canceled. Istanbul Metropolitan Municipality accused Sıla of "ridiculing the people" for calling their gathering for democracy a "show", to which Sıla responded by saying: "Democracy is being able to respect the differences and to live shoulder to shoulder with those colorful differences." and stated that she did not intend to target or mock anyone who lost his life during the coup attempt. BirGün wrote that Sıla was targeted by reports published in Sabah due to the latter's close relationship with the Justice and Development Party. In December, Emre Çevik of Sözcü wrote that even with the municipal intervention in the concerts, the fans still fill up Sıla's concerts more than ever before.

In October 2017, Sıla released a new single titled "Muhbir". In November 2018, she accused her then-boyfriend Ahmet Kural of physical and psychological violence. In accordance with law, the court issued a restraining order and ordered Kural to stay away from Sıla for 3 months. In December 2018, Sıla was among the four people that received an honorary award at the 45th Golden Butterfly Awards. On 1 March 2019, Sony Music released her new EP, titled Acı, which was well received by the critics. Writing for Habertürk newspaper, Esin Övet mentioned Sıla's problems with Ahmet Kural and wrote: "Sıla, the brave hearted woman, ignored her career and, in fine details, told everyone about the violence she had experienced by the man she loved". Mayk Şişman from Milliyet wrote that in this album Sıla was "more concerned with [establishing an] 'identity' rather than producing hits". Another EP, titled Meşk, was released later that year on 26 July 2019 by Sony Music. It consisted of three songs, for which Sıla worked with Umut Yaşar Sarıkaya, Efe Bahadır, İlker Bayraktar and Sezen Aksu. A music video for the song "Karanfil" was shot at Lake Bafa and released on the same day as the EP. It was followed by a second music video for the song "Haytalar Dükkanı". In October 2019, she appeared in a commercial for the Chinese brand Oppo after signing a ₺3 million contract.

In January 2020, Sıla was featured in a new duet single titled "Yaralım" with acclaimed Turkish cult singer Nükhet Duru as a part of the latter's tribute album Hikayesi Var.

== Discography ==
- Sıla (2007)
- İmza (2009)
- Konuşmadığımız Şeyler Var (2010)
- Vaveyla (2012)
- Yeni Ay (2014)
- Mürekkep (2016)
- Şarkıcı (2022)
