= Ferhat Göçer =

Turkish musical artist and doctor (born 1970)

Background information
- Born: 11 May 1970 (age 56); Birecik, Turkey
- Genres: Pop, opera
- Occupations: Singer, surgeon
- Years active: 2002–present
- Labels: Klip; DMC; Emre; Poll; Üçüncü Göz; MMF; Gloss

Ferhat Göçer (born 11 May 1970) is a Turkish pop singer, songwriter and physician.

Born to a family with Kurdish origin as the eldest son of his parents, Göçer was born in Birecik and raised in İzmit. At his parents' request, he started his education at the age of 4. In 1985 he graduated from İzmit High School. He later won a scholarship for Istanbul Faculty of Medicine and in 1988 got enrolled in Istanbul University State Conservatory Singing Department after which he worked as a contractor for State Opera and Ballet.

From November 2012 to May 2014, he was a UNICEF goodwill ambassador for Turkey. In 2017, he retired after 25 years of working as a physician.

== Discography ==
=== Studio albums ===
List of albums, sales and certifications
Album	Album info	Certifications	Sales
Ferhat Göçer	Published: 5 September 2005 (TR); Label: DMC; Format: CD, cassette, digital download	MÜ-YAP: Diamond	Turkey: 186,000
Yolun Açık Olsun	Published: 23 February 2007 (TR); Label: DMC; Format: CD, cassette, digital download	MÜ-YAP: Diamond	Turkey: 351,000
Çok Sevdim İkimizi	Published: 29 April 2008 (TR); Label: DMC; Format: CD, cassette, digital download	MÜ-YAP: Diamond	Turkey: 303,000
Biz Aşkımıza Bakalım	Published: 1 April 2010 (TR); Label: DMC; Format: CD, cassette, digital download		Turkey: 132,383
Seni Sevmeye Aşığım	Published: 20 October 2011 (TR); Label: Emre Plak; Format: CD, digital download		Turkey: 89,000
Kalbe Kiralık Aşklar	Published: 7 October 2013 (TR); Label: Emre Plak; Format: CD, digital download		Turkey: 46,043
Sığmıyorsun Geceye ve Zamana	Published: 27 April 2015 (TR); Label: Erol Köse, Üçüncü Göz; Format: CD, digital download		
Bu Kalp İçinde Teksin	Published: 21 December 2017 (TR); Label: DMC; Format: CD, digital download		
Düştüm Ben Yollara	Released: 11 November 2015 (TR); Label: Üçüncü Göz; Format: CD, digital download		
Bu Kalp İçinde Teksin	Released: 21 December 2017 (TR); Label: DMC; Format: CD, digital download		
Sabahattin Ali Şarkıları	Released: 24 January 2020 (TR); Label: Poll; Format: CD, digital download		
Anadolu Aryaları Vol. 1	Released: 30 October 2020 (TR); Label: MMF; Format: Digital download		
Bana Aşkı Yaşat	Released: 28 May 2021 (TR); Label: MMF; Format: Digital download		
DüetZ	Released: 28 January 2022 (TR); Label: MMF; Format: Digital download		

=== Compilation albums ===
List of albums
Album	Album info
Çok Sevdim İkimizi & Remixes	Published: 22 December 2008 (TR); Label: DMC; Format: CD, digital download
Koleksiyon 6`lı	Published: 2 July 2012 (TR); Label: DMC; Format: CD, digital download
Seni Sevmeye Aşığım & Remixes (feat. DJ All Stars)	Published: 1 August 2012 (TR); Label: Emre Plak; Format: CD, digital download

=== EPs ===
List of albums
Album	Album info
Silinmeyen Hatıralar (feat. Catwork Project)	Published: 14 July 2014 (TR); Label: DMC; Format: CD, digital download
O'rient	Released: 6 September 2019 (TR); Label: MMF; Format: Digital download
Ağır Yaralı	Released: 26 June 2020 (TR); Label: MMF; Format: Digital download
Evolution	Released: 18 December 2020 (TR); Label: MMF Edisyon; Format: Digital download
Aşk Ülkesi	Released: 22 January 2021 (TR); Label: MMF Edisyon; Format: Digital download
Geceleri Bi' De Bana Sor	Released: 26 February 2021 (TR); Label: MMF Edisyon; Format: Digital download
Yalnız Bir Şehir	Released: 23 April 2021 (TR); Label: MMF Edisyon; Format: Digital download
OPIA	Released: 30 July 2021 (TR); Label: MMF Edisyon; Format: Digital download
RÜYA	Released: 1 October 2021 (TR); Label: MMF; Format: Digital download
Senin İçin	Released: 5 November 2021 (TR); Label: MMF; Format: Digital download

=== Singles ===
List of singles
Single	Single info
Götür Beni Gittiğin Yere	Published: 17 November 2009 (TR); Label: DMC; Format: CD, digital download
Yarabbim	Published: 10 April 2013 (TR); Label: Emre Plak; Format: CD, digital download
Sarıyer Marşı	Released: 18 May 2016 (TR); Label: DMC; Format: CD, digital download
Yalan Dünya	Released: 13 August 2016 (TR); Label: DMC; Format: CD, digital download
Aşkın Mevsimi Olmaz ki	Released: 2 February 2017 (TR); Label: DMC; Format: CD, digital download
Yaz	Released: 24 August 2017 (TR); Label: DMC; Format: CD, digital download
Günah	Released: 26 October 2017 (TR); Label: DMC; Format: CD, digital download
Reva	Released: 27 July 2018 (TR); Label: DMC; Format: CD, digital download
İçimdeki Hazine	Released: 4 January 2019 (TR); Label: MMF; Format: Digital download
Sensin	Released: 6 March 2019 (TR); Label: MMF; Format: Digital download
Mazlum	Released: 4 September 2020 (TR); Label: Gloss; Format: Digital download
Götür Beni Gittiğin Yere (with Yüksel Baltacı)	Released: 13 November 2020 (TR); Label: Seyhan Müzik; Format: Digital download
Sorarlarsa	Released: 26 March 2021 (TR); Label: MMF; Format: Digital download
Eski Toprak	Released: 15 April 2021 (TR); Label: ikmMedya; Format: Digital download
Eski Toprak (Live Performance)	Released: 15 April 2021 (TR); Label: ikmMedya; Format: Digital download

=== Split albums ===
List of albums
Album	Album info
Altın Güvercin Şarkıları 1986–2000 (with Eda Berker)	Released: 2002 (TR)

=== Charts ===
List of singles, release date and album name
Single	Year	Peak	Album
Single	Year	TR	Album
"Cennet"	2007	1	Yolun Açık Olsun
"Yolun Açık Olsun"	2007	—	Yolun Açık Olsun
"İsyan"	2007	—	Yolun Açık Olsun
"Gidemem"	2007	5	Yolun Açık Olsun
"Kalp Kalbe Karşı" (feat. Enbe Orkestrası & Aslı Güngör)	2008	1	Enbe Orkestrası
"Bizim Şarkımız"	2008	1	Çok Sevdim İkimizi
"Biri Bana Gelsin"	2008	1	Çok Sevdim İkimizi
"Gül Ki"	2008	2	Çok Sevdim İkimizi
"Sen Söyle Hayat"	2008	2	Çok Sevdim İkimizi
"Aklım Sende Kalır"	2008	17	Çok Sevdim İkimizi
"Götür Beni Gittiğin Yere"	2009	10	Götür Beni Gittiğin Yere
"Kızım"	2010	—	Biz Aşkımıza Bakalım
"Üzüm"	2010	1	Biz Aşkımıza Bakalım
"Kalp Kırılsa da Sever"	2010	13	Biz Aşkımıza Bakalım
"Vefası Eksik Yarim"	2010	9	Biz Aşkımıza Bakalım
"Bunları Boşver"	2010	11	Biz Aşkımıza Bakalım
"Yanındayım"	2011	—	Biz Aşkımıza Bakalım
"Mehtabın Rengi"	2011	—	Seni Sevmeye Aşığım
"Unutmuş Çoktan"	2011	2	Seni Sevmeye Aşığım
"Ayrılsak Ölürüz Biz"	2012	2	Seni Sevmeye Aşığım
"Sevmeye Aşığım"	2012	—	Seni Sevmeye Aşığım
"Yanına Kalmaz"	2012	—	Seni Sevmeye Aşığım
"Esirinim"	2013	—	Seni Sevmeye Aşığım
"Yarabbim"	2013	—	Yarabbim
"Git"	2013	1	Kalbe Kiralık Aşklar
"Sarıl Bana"	2014	3	Kalbe Kiralık Aşklar
"Kalbe Kiralık Aşklar"	2014	—	Kalbe Kiralık Aşklar
"Silinmeyen Hatıralar" (feat. Catwork Project)	2014	—	Silinmeyen Hatıralar
"Yıllarım Gitti"	2015	2	Sığmıyorsun Geceye ve Zamana
"Düştüm Ben Yollara" (feat. Volga Tamöz)	2015	4	Düştüm Ben Yollara
"Günah" (feat. Volga Tamöz)	2017	1	Günah
"Sen Elimden Tut"	2018	5	Bu Kalp İçinde Teksin
"—" indicates that the songs were not included in the lists or the results were not disclosed.
