= Radiomonitor Türkiye =

Turkish airplay chart

Radiomonitor Türkiye, previously known as MusicTopTR, is the official Turkish airplay chart composed exclusively of Turkish language singles in Turkey. The official chart was initially issued by Nielsen Music Control under the name Türkçe Top 20 but is now provided by Radiomonitor.

The chart was previously announced from the Nielsen's website weekly. Billboard Türkiye magazine also used Nielsen data for their single charts. Billboard has continued to publish Turkey Songs chart, which exclusively list trending Turkish-language songs weekly.

== Lists of number-one songs ==
- 2006
- 2007
- 2008
- 2009
- 2010
- 2011
- 2012
- 2013
- 2014
- 2015
- 2016
- 2017
- 2018
- 2019
- 2020
- 2021
- 2022
- 2023
- 2024
- 2025

== Artists and songs with the most weeks at number one ==
Year	Artists with the most weeks at number one	Songs with the most weeks at number one
2006	(8) Demet Akalın	(7) "Afedersin" – Demet Akalın "Afili Yalnızlık" – Emre Aydın
2007	(9) Mustafa Sandal, Sıla, Kenan Doğulu	(9) "İndir" – Mustafa Sandal "...dan Sonra" – Sıla ft. Kenan Doğulu
2008	(16) Rafet El Roman, Yusuf Güney	(16) "Aşk-ı Virane" – Rafet El Roman & Yusuf Güney
2009	(13) Mustafa Ceceli	(10) "Limon Çiçekleri" – Mustafa Ceceli
2010	(13) Sıla	(8) "Alain Delon" – Ozan Doğulu ft. Sıla
2011	(10) Sıla	(8) "Sen ve Ben" – Funda Arar
2012	(10) Gökhan Türkmen	(10) "Bitmesin" – Gökhan Türkmen
2013	(14) Gülşen	(8) "Yatcaz Kalkcaz Ordayım" – Gülşen
2014	(12) Gülşen, Murat Boz, Sıla	(12) "İltimas" – Gülşen & Murat Boz
2015	(13) Gülşen	(13) "Bangır Bangır" – Gülşen
2016	(7) Ayla Çelik, Beyazıt Öztürk	(7) "Bağdat"
2017	(14) Tarkan	(13) "Yolla"
2018	(16) Emrah Karaduman	(11) "Yalnız Çiçek" - Emrah Karaduman ft. Aleyna Tilki
2019	(13) Gülşen	(13) "Bir İhtimal Biliyorum"
2020	(10) Oğuzhan Koç	(9) "Daha İyi" - Hande Ünsal
