= List of number-one hits of 2008 (Turkey) =

List of songs that reach number one in Türkçe Top 20, the Turkish airplay chart in 2008. The list is updated every Thursday by Nielsen Music Control.

Date	Songs	Artist
January 5, 2008	...Dan Sonra	Sıla & Kenan Doğulu
January 12	...Dan Sonra	Sıla & Kenan Doğulu
January 19	...Dan Sonra	Sıla & Kenan Doğulu
January 26	Vay Anam Vay	Tarkan
February 2	Vay Anam Vay	Tarkan
February 9	Vay Anam Vay	Tarkan
February 16	Kalp Kalbe Karşı	Aslı Güngör & Ferhat Göçer
February 23	Kalp Kalbe Karşı	Aslı Güngör & Ferhat Göçer
March 1	Kalp Kalbe Karşı	Aslı Güngör & Ferhat Göçer
March 8	Kalp Kalbe Karşı	Aslı Güngör & Ferhat Göçer
March 15	Kalp Kalbe Karşı	Aslı Güngör & Ferhat Göçer
March 22	Kalp Kalbe Karşı	Aslı Güngör & Ferhat Göçer
March 29	Kalp Kalbe Karşı	Aslı Güngör & Ferhat Göçer
April 5	Mucize	Demet Akalın
April 12	4 Minutes	Madonna ft. Justin Timberlake
April 19	Mucize	Demet Akalın
April 26	4 Minutes	Madonna ft. Justin Timberlake
May 3	4 Minutes	Madonna ft. Justin Timberlake
May 10	Mucize	Demet Akalın
May 17	Mucize	Demet Akalın
May 24	Bizim Şarkımız	Ferhat Göçer
May 31	Bizim Şarkımız	Ferhat Göçer
June 7	Bas Gaza	İsmail YK
June 14	Bas Gaza	İsmail YK
June 21	Bas Gaza	İsmail YK
June 28	Bas Gaza	İsmail YK
July 5	Biri Bana Gelsin	Ferhat Göçer
July 12	Bas Gaza	İsmail YK
July 19	Bas Gaza	İsmail YK
July 26	Bas Gaza	İsmail YK
August 2	Biri Bana Gelsin	Ferhat Göçer
August 9	Biri Bana Gelsin	Ferhat Göçer
August 16	Biri Bana Gelsin	Ferhat Göçer
August 23	Şeytan	Serdar Ortaç
August 30	Şeytan	Serdar Ortaç
September 6	Şeytan	Serdar Ortaç
September 13	Aşk-ı Virane	Rafet El Roman & Yusuf Güney
September 20	Aşk-ı Virane	Rafet El Roman & Yusuf Güney
September 27	Aşk-ı Virane	Rafet El Roman & Yusuf Güney
October 4	Aşk-ı Virane	Rafet El Roman & Yusuf Güney
October 12	Aşk-ı Virane	Rafet El Roman & Yusuf Güney
October 19	Aşk-ı Virane	Rafet El Roman & Yusuf Güney
October 26	Aşk-ı Virane	Rafet El Roman & Yusuf Güney
November 3	Aşk-ı Virane	Rafet El Roman & Yusuf Güney
November 10	Aşk-ı Virane	Rafet El Roman & Yusuf Güney
November 17	Aşk-ı Virane	Rafet El Roman & Yusuf Güney
November 24	Aşk-ı Virane	Rafet El Roman & Yusuf Güney
December 1	Aşk-ı Virane	Rafet El Roman & Yusuf Güney
December 8	Aşk-ı Virane	Rafet El Roman & Yusuf Güney
December 15	Aşk-ı Virane	Rafet El Roman & Yusuf Güney
December 22	Aşk-ı Virane	Rafet El Roman & Yusuf Güney
December 29	Aşk-ı Virane	Rafet El Roman & Yusuf Güney
