= List of number-one hits of 2009 (Turkey) =

List of songs that reach number one in Türkçe Top 20, the Turkish airplay chart in 2009. The list is updated every Thursday by Nielsen Music Control.

Date	Songs	Artist
January 5, 2009	Aşk-ı Virane	Rafet El Roman & Yusuf Güney
January 12	Gram	Serdar Ortaç
January 19	Kasaba	Murat Dalkılıç
January 26	Anlamazdın	Ayla Dikmen
February 2	Kasaba	Murat Dalkılıç
February 9	Kasaba	Murat Dalkılıç
February 16	Kasaba	Murat Dalkılıç
February 23	Kasaba	Murat Dalkılıç
March 3	Kasaba	Murat Dalkılıç
March 9	Kasaba	Murat Dalkılıç
March 16	Seviyorum Sevmiyorum	Nil Karaibrahimgil
March 23	Seviyorum Sevmiyorum	Nil Karaibrahimgil
March 30	Sevişmeden Uyumayalım	Sıla
April 6	Sevişmeden Uyumayalım	Sıla
April 13	Sevişmeden Uyumayalım	Sıla
April 20	Seviyorum Sevmiyorum	Nil Karaibrahimgil
April 27	Seviyorum Sevmiyorum	Nil Karaibrahimgil
May 4	Seviyorum Sevmiyorum	Nil Karaibrahimgil
May 11	Seviyorum Sevmiyorum	Nil Karaibrahimgil
May 18	Dünyanın Sonuna Doğmuşum	Manga
May 25	Giden Günlerim Oldu	Gülben Ergen & Oğuzhan Koç
June 1	Giden Günlerim Oldu	Gülben Ergen & Oğuzhan Koç
June 8	Giden Günlerim Oldu	Gülben Ergen & Oğuzhan Koç
June 15	Giden Günlerim Oldu	Gülben Ergen & Oğuzhan Koç
June 22	Giden Günlerim Oldu	Gülben Ergen & Oğuzhan Koç
June 29	Giden Günlerim Oldu	Gülben Ergen & Oğuzhan Koç
July 6	Ah Be Kardeşim	Yalın
July 13	Ah Be Kardeşim	Yalın
July 20	Bu Böyle	Sertab Erener
July 27	Bu Böyle	Sertab Erener
August 3	Toz Pembe	Demet Akalın
August 10	Bu Böyle	Sertab Erener
August 17	İki Melek	Bengü
August 24	İki Melek	Bengü
August 31	İki Melek	Bengü
September 7	Limon Çiçekleri	Mustafa Ceceli
September 14	Limon Çiçekleri	Mustafa Ceceli
September 21	Limon Çiçekleri	Mustafa Ceceli
September 28	Limon Çiçekleri	Mustafa Ceceli
October 5	Limon Çiçekleri	Mustafa Ceceli
October 12	Limon Çiçekleri	Mustafa Ceceli
October 19	Limon Çiçekleri	Mustafa Ceceli
October 26	Limon Çiçekleri	Mustafa Ceceli
November 2	Limon Çiçekleri	Mustafa Ceceli
November 9	Limon Çiçekleri	Mustafa Ceceli
November 16	Kocaman Öpüyorum	Bengü
November 23	Kocaman Öpüyorum	Bengü
November 30	Kocaman Öpüyorum	Bengü
December 7	Kocaman Öpüyorum	Bengü
December 14	Hastalıkta Sağlıkta	Mustafa Ceceli
December 21	Hastalıkta Sağlıkta	Mustafa Ceceli
December 28	Hastalıkta Sağlıkta	Mustafa Ceceli
