= List of number-one hits of 2006 (Turkey) =

List of songs that reached number one in Türkçe Top 20, the Turkish airplay chart in 2006. The list is updated every Thursday by Nielsen Music Control.

| Date | Single | Performer |
|---|---|---|
| 13 March | "Belki Üstümüzden Bir Kuş Geçer" | Yüksek Sadakat |
| 20 March | "Belki Üstümüzden Bir Kuş Geçer" | Yüksek Sadakat |
| 27 March | "Keşke" | Yalın |
| 3 April | "Nerdesin" | Gece Yolcuları |
| 10 April | "Nerdesin" | Gece Yolcuları |
| 17 April | "Yurtta Aşk Cihanda Aşk" | Gülşen |
| 24 April | "Yurtta Aşk Cihanda Aşk" | Gülşen |
| 1 May | "Yurtta Aşk Cihanda Aşk" | Gülşen |
| 8 May | "Aşkın Ateşi" | Hande Yener |
| 15 May | "Sarı Laleler" | MFÖ |
| 22 May | "Sarı Laleler" | MFÖ |
| 29 May | "Sarı Laleler" | MFÖ |
| 5 June | "Sor" | Serdar Ortaç |
| 12 June | "Sor" | Serdar Ortaç |
| 19 June | "Sarı Laleler" | MFÖ |
| 26 June | "Afedersin" | Demet Akalın |
| 3 July | "Afedersin" | Demet Akalın |
| 10 July | "Afedersin" | Demet Akalın |
| 17 July | "Afedersin" | Demet Akalın |
| 24 July | "Afedersin" | Demet Akalın |
| 31 July | "Afedersin" | Demet Akalın |
| 7 August | "Afedersin" | Demet Akalın |
| 14 August | "Çakkıdı" | Kenan Doğulu |
| 21 August | "Çakkıdı" | Kenan Doğulu |
| 28 August | "Çakkıdı" | Kenan Doğulu |
| 4 September | "Çakkıdı" | Kenan Doğulu |
| 11 September | "Çakkıdı" | Kenan Doğulu |
| 18 September | "Çakkıdı" | Kenan Doğulu |
| 25 September | "Herkes Hak Ettiği Gibi Yaşıyor" | Demet Akalın |
| 2 October | "Gitme" | Serdar Ortaç |
| 9 October | "Gitme" | Serdar Ortaç |
| 16 October | "Afili Yalnızlık" | Emre Aydın |
| 23 October | "Afili Yalnızlık" | Emre Aydın |
| 30 October | "Afili Yalnızlık" | Emre Aydın |
| 6 November | "Afili Yalnızlık" | Emre Aydın |
| 13 November | "Afili Yalnızlık" | Emre Aydın |
| 20 November | "Afili Yalnızlık" | Emre Aydın |
| 27 November | "Aşkım Baksana Bana" | Nazan Öncel |
| 4 December | "Aşkım Baksana Bana" | Nazan Öncel |
| 11 December | "Afili Yalnızlık" | Emre Aydın |
| 18 December | "Aşkım Baksana Bana" | Nazan Öncel |
| 25 December | "Hayırdır İnşallah" | Yaşar |
