= List of number-one songs of 2017 (Turkey) =

This is the complete list of number-one singles in Turkey in 2017 according to Radiomonitor. The list on the left side of the box (Resmi Liste, "the Official List") represents physical and digital track sales as well as music streaming of the Turkish artists, and the one on the right side (Yabancı Liste, "the Foreign List") represents the same thing for foreign artists.

== Chart history ==
Date	Song (National)	Artist (National)	Song (Foreign)	Artist (Foreign)
6 January	Aşk mı Lazım	Buray	Just Say	KDA featuring Tinashe
13 January	Aşk mı Lazım	Buray	Rockabye	Clean Bandit ft. Sean Paul and Anne-Marie
20 January	Aşk mı Lazım	Buray	Just Say	KDA ft. Tinashe
27 January	Aşk mı Lazım	Buray	Rockabye	Clean Bandit ft. Sean Paul and Anne-Marie
3 February	Aşk mı Lazım	Buray	Rockabye	Clean Bandit ft. Sean Paul and Anne-Marie
10 February	Canavar	Derya Uluğ	Rockabye	Clean Bandit ft. Sean Paul and Anne-Marie
17 February	Canavar	Derya Uluğ	Rockabye	Clean Bandit ft. Sean Paul and Anne-Marie
24 February	Canavar	Derya Uluğ	Rockabye	Clean Bandit ft. Sean Paul and Anne-Marie
3 March	Canavar	Derya Uluğ	Shape of You	Ed Sheeran
10 March	Aşkın Mevsimi Olmaz Ki	Ferhat Göçer	Shape of You	Ed Sheeran
17 March	Aşkın Mevsimi Olmaz Ki	Ferhat Göçer	Shape of You	Ed Sheeran
24 March	Aşkın Mevsimi Olmaz Ki	Ferhat Göçer	Shape of You	Ed Sheeran
31 March	Aşkın Mevsimi Olmaz Ki	Ferhat Göçer	Shape of You	Ed Sheeran
7 April	Canavar	Derya Uluğ	Shape of You	Ed Sheeran
14 April	Canavar	Derya Uluğ	Shape of You	Ed Sheeran
21 April	Canavar	Derya Uluğ	Shape of You	Ed Sheeran
28 April	İhanetten Geri Kalan	Sezen Aksu	Shape of You	Ed Sheeran
5 May	İhanetten Geri Kalan	Sezen Aksu	Shape of You	Ed Sheeran
12 May	İhanetten Geri Kalan	Sezen Aksu	Shape of You	Ed Sheeran
19 May	İhanetten Geri Kalan	Sezen Aksu	Shape of You	Ed Sheeran
26 May	İhanetten Geri Kalan	Sezen Aksu	Shape of You	Ed Sheeran
2 June	Küsme Aşka	Oğuzhan Koç	Shape of You	Ed Sheeran
9 June	Tekamül	Soner Sarıkabadayı	Ciao Adios	Anne-Marie
16 June	Canavar	Derya Uluğ	Ciao Adios	Anne-Marie
23 June	Yolla	Tarkan	Despacito	Luis Fonsi ft. Daddy Yankee
30 June	Yolla	Tarkan	Despacito	Luis Fonsi ft. Daddy Yankee
7 July	Yolla	Tarkan	Despacito	Luis Fonsi ft. Daddy Yankee
14 July	Yolla	Tarkan	Despacito	Luis Fonsi ft. Daddy Yankee
21 July	Yolla	Tarkan	Despacito	Luis Fonsi ft. Daddy Yankee
28 July	Yolla	Tarkan	Despacito	Luis Fonsi ft. Daddy Yankee
4 August	Yolla	Tarkan	Despacito	Luis Fonsi ft. Daddy Yankee
11 August	Yolla	Tarkan	Despacito	Luis Fonsi ft. Daddy Yankee
18 August	Yolla	Tarkan	Despacito	Luis Fonsi ft. Daddy Yankee
25 August	Yolla	Tarkan	Despacito	Luis Fonsi ft. Daddy Yankee
1 September	Yolla	Tarkan	Despacito	Luis Fonsi ft. Daddy Yankee
8 September	Yolla	Tarkan	Despacito	Luis Fonsi ft. Daddy Yankee
15 September	Yolla	Tarkan	Despacito	Luis Fonsi ft. Daddy Yankee
22 September	Sen Olsan Bari	Aleyna Tilki	Despacito	Luis Fonsi ft. Daddy Yankee
29 September	Sen Olsan Bari	Aleyna Tilki	Mi Gente	J Balvin and Willy William
6 October	Aşinayız	Murat Dalkılıç ft. Oğuzhan Koç	Mi Gente	J Balvin and Willy William
13 October	Aşinayız	Murat Dalkılıç ft. Oğuzhan Koç	Mi Gente	J Balvin and Willy William
20 October	Aşinayız	Murat Dalkılıç ft. Oğuzhan Koç	Mi Gente	J Balvin and Willy William
27 October	Aşinayız	Murat Dalkılıç ft. Oğuzhan Koç	Mi Gente	J Balvin and Willy William
3 November	İnceden İnceden	Tuğba Yurt	Mi Gente	J Balvin and Willy William
10 November	İnceden İnceden	Tuğba Yurt	Mi Gente	J Balvin and Willy William
17 November	İnceden İnceden	Tuğba Yurt	Mi Gente	J Balvin and Willy William
24 November	Sıfır Tolerans	Hadise	Mi Gente	J Balvin and Willy William
1 December	Sıfır Tolerans	Hadise	Mi Gente	J Balvin and Willy William
8 December	Günah	Ferhat Göçer feat. Volga Tamöz	Mi Gente	J Balvin and Willy William
15 December	Günah	Ferhat Göçer feat. Volga Tamöz	Havana	Camila Cabello feat. Young Thug
22 December	Beni Çok Sev	Tarkan	Havana	Camila Cabello feat. Young Thug
29 December	Sinsirella	Aylin Coşkun	Havana	Camila Cabello feat. Young Thug
