= List of number-one songs of 2016 (Turkey) =

This is the complete list of number-one singles in Turkey in 2016 according to Radiomonitor. The list on the left side of the box (Resmi Liste, "the Official List") represents physical and digital track sales as well as music streaming of the Turkish artists, and the one on the right side (Yabancı Liste, "the Foreign List") represents the same thing for foreign artists.

== Chart history ==
Date	Song (National)	Artist (National)	Song (Foreign)	Artist (Foreign)
4 January	Yapboz	Emre Kaya	Don't Be So Shy (Filatov & Karas Remix)	Imany ft. Filatov & Karas
8 January	Yapboz	Emre Kaya	Don't Be So Shy (Filatov & Karas Remix)	Imany ft. Filatov & Karas
15 January	Yapboz	Emre Kaya	Hello	Adele
22 January	Bir Hadise Var	Mabel Matiz	Hello	Adele
29 January	Bir Hadise Var	Mabel Matiz	Hello	Adele
5 February	Bir Hadise Var	Mabel Matiz	Don't Be So Shy (Filatov & Karas Remix)	Imany ft. Filatov & Karas
12 February	Sen Sevda Mısın	Buray	Don't Be So Shy (Filatov & Karas Remix)	Imany ft. Filatov & Karas
19 February	Sen Sevda Mısın	Buray	Don't Be So Shy (Filatov & Karas Remix)	Imany ft. Filatov & Karas
26 February	Sen Sevda Mısın	Buray	Bludfire	Eva Simons feat. Sidney Samson
4 March	Muhtemel Aşk	27 (ft. Birol Namoğlu)	Ego	Willy William
11 March	Muhtemel Aşk	27 (ft. Birol Namoğlu)	Ego	Willy William
18 March	Muhtemel Aşk	27 (ft. Birol Namoğlu)	Ego	Willy William
25 March	Muhtemel Aşk	27 (ft. Birol Namoğlu)	Ego	Willy William
1 April	Muhtemel Aşk	27 (ft. Birol Namoğlu)	Cheap Thrills	Sia feat. Sean Paul
8 April	Dantel	İrem Derici	Cheap Thrills	Sia feat. Sean Paul
15 April	Dantel	İrem Derici	Cheap Thrills	Sia feat. Sean Paul
22 April	Dantel	İrem Derici	Cheap Thrills	Sia feat. Sean Paul
29 April	Dantel	İrem Derici	Cheap Thrills	Sia feat. Sean Paul
6 May	Janti	Murat Boz	Cheap Thrills	Sia feat. Sean Paul
13 May	Bağdat	Ayla Çelik feat. Beyazıt Öztürk	Cheap Thrills	Sia feat. Sean Paul
20 May	Janti	Murat Boz	Cheap Thrills	Sia feat. Sean Paul
27 May	Bağdat	Ayla Çelik (feat. Beyazıt Öztürk)	Cheap Thrills	Sia feat. Sean Paul
3 June	Bağdat	Ayla Çelik (feat. Beyazıt Öztürk)	Cheap Thrills	Sia feat. Sean Paul
10 June	Bağdat	Ayla Çelik (feat. Beyazıt Öztürk)	Cheap Thrills	Sia feat. Sean Paul
17 June	Bağdat	Ayla Çelik (feat. Beyazıt Öztürk)	Cheap Thrills	Sia feat. Sean Paul
24 June	Bağdat	Ayla Çelik (feat. Beyazıt Öztürk)	Cheap Thrills	Sia feat. Sean Paul
1 July	Bağdat	Ayla Çelik (feat. Beyazıt Öztürk)	Cheap Thrills	Sia feat. Sean Paul
8 July	Janti	Murat Boz	Cheap Thrills	Sia feat. Sean Paul
15 July	Mor	Hande Yener	Cheap Thrills	Sia feat. Sean Paul
22 July	Mor	Hande Yener	Cheap Thrills	Sia feat. Sean Paul
29 July	Mor	Hande Yener	Cheap Thrills	Sia feat. Sean Paul
5 August	Okyanus	Derya Uluğ	Cheap Thrills	Sia feat. Sean Paul
12 August	Okyanus	Derya Uluğ	Cheap Thrills	Sia feat. Sean Paul
19 August	Okyanus	Derya Uluğ	Cheap Thrills	Sia feat. Sean Paul
26 August	Adeyyo	Ece Seçkin	Lost on You	LP
2 September	Adeyyo	Ece Seçkin	Lost on You	LP
9 September	Adeyyo	Ece Seçkin	Lost on You	LP
16 September	Adeyyo	Ece Seçkin	Lost on You	LP
23 September	Adeyyo	Ece Seçkin	Lost on You	LP
30 September	Adeyyo	Ece Seçkin	Lost on You	LP
7 October	Adeyyo	Ece Seçkin	Lost on You	LP
14 October	Adeyyo	Ece Seçkin	Lost on You	LP
21 October	Adeyyo	Ece Seçkin	Lost on You	LP
28 October	Hacıyatmaz	Emirhan Cengiz (feat. Betül Demir)	Lost on You	LP
4 November	Hacıyatmaz	Emirhan Cengiz (feat. Betül Demir)	Lost on You	LP
11 November	Hacıyatmaz	Emirhan Cengiz (feat. Betül Demir)	Lost on You	LP
18 November	Dın Dın	Emre Kaya	Lost on You	LP
25 November	Hayalet	Demet Akalın	Lost on You	LP
2 December	Hayalet	Demet Akalın	Lost on You	LP
9 December	Hayalet	Demet Akalın	Lost on You	LP
16 December	Hayalet	Demet Akalın	Lost on You	LP
23 December	Hayalet	Demet Akalın	Rockabye	Clean Bandit ft. Sean Paul and Anne-Marie
30 December	Aşk mı Lazım	Buray	Rockabye	Clean Bandit ft. Sean Paul and Anne-Marie
