= Sahiden =

2016 studio album by Buray

Studio album by Buray
- Released: 11 November 2016
- Genre: Pop
- Length: 36:44
- Label: Sony Music

Buray chronology
İstersen Remixes (2015)	Sahiden (2016)	Kehanet (2018)

Sahiden (Indeed) is the second studio album by Cypriot-Turkish singer Buray. It was released on 11 November 2016, accompanied by a music video for the song "Aşk mı Lazım". Four other music videos were released for the album. The songs were written by Buray and Gözde Ançel, and Bahadır Tanrıvermiş served as the music director.

Neziha Kartal of Habertürk gave the album a positive review and named "Sahiden" and "Ay Parçası" as the best pieces in it. In his report for NTV, Suat Kavukluoğlu also praised the variety in the album, and liked its "rich melodies and sweet lyrics".

== Track listing ==
Sahiden
No.	Title	Writer(s)	Composer(s)	Length
1.	"Aşk mı Lazım"	Gözde Ançel	Buray · Gözde Ançel	3:44
2.	"Seni Sevmiyorum Artık"	Gözde Ançel	Buray · Gözde Ançel	3:29
3.	"Melodi"	Gözde Ançel	Buray · Gözde Ançel	3:11
4.	"Kalbime Dokundu"	Gözde Ançel	Buray · Gözde Ançel	2:55
5.	"Sahiden"	Gözde Ançel	Buray · Gözde Ançel	3:53
6.	"Sen Hala Sokağımda"	Gözde Ançel	Buray · Gözde Ançel	3:05
7.	"Mecnun"	Gözde Ançel	Buray · Gözde Ançel	3:20
8.	"Olmadı"	Gözde Ançel	Buray · Gözde Ançel	3:20
9.	"Ay Parçası"	Gözde Ançel	Buray · Gözde Ançel	3:49
10.	"Günlerden Sonbahar"	Gözde Ançel	Buray · Gözde Ançel	3:13
11.	"Deli Divane"	Gözde Ançel	Buray · Gözde Ançel	3:56
12.	"Gül Goncalar"	Bülent Fevzioğlu	Turgay Selim Hoşsöz	3:51
Total length:				36:44

== Charts ==
Single	Chart (2017)	Peak position
"Aşk mı Lazım"	MusicTopTR Official Chart	2

== Release history ==
Country	Date	Format(s)	Label
Turkey	11 November 2016	CD · Digital download	Sony
Worldwide	11 November 2016	Digital download	Sony
