= İstersen Remixes =

2015 album by Buray

Remix album by Buray
- Released: 30 October 2015
- Genre: Pop
- Length: 32:27
- Label: Sony Music

Buray chronology
| 1 Şişe Aşk (2015) | İstersen Remixes (2015) | Sahiden (2016) |

İstersen Remixes is the first remix album by Cypriot-Turkish singer Buray. It was released on 30 October 2015 by Sony Music.

== Release and content ==
Following the high demands for a remix album after the release of his first studio album 1 Şişe Aşk, Buray released remixed versions of the album's lead single, "İstersen", as an album on digital platforms.

The song was written by Gözde Ançel, and composed by Buray together with Ançel. Seven different remixes for "İstersen" were included in the album. DJs Mahmut Orhan, Serhat Karadağ, Soner Babutsa, Sunstroke, Kougan Ray, G.E.M.N.I and Levent Aydın created these altered versions.

== Track listing ==
İstersen Remixes
| No. | Title | Writer(s) | Composer(s) | Length |
|---|---|---|---|---|
| 1. | "İstersen" (Mahmut Orhan Remix) | Gözde Ançel | Buray · Ançel | 6:10 |
| 2. | "İstersen" (Sunstroke Club Remix) | Ançel | Buray · Ançel | 4:23 |
| 3. | "İstersen" (Kral Pop Remix) | Ançel | Buray · Ançel | 4:03 |
| 4. | "İstersen" (Kougan Ray Club Mix) | Ançel | Buray · Ançel | 4:50 |
| 5. | "İstersen" (Soner Babutsa House Mix) | Ançel | Buray · Ançel | 4:32 |
| 6. | "İstersen" (G.E.M.N.I Remix) | Ançel | Buray · Ançel | 3:46 |
| 7. | "İstersen" (Levent Aydın Remix) | Ançel | Buray · Ançel | 4:43 |
| Total length: | | | | 32:27 |

== Charts ==
| Single | Chart (2015) | Peak position |
|---|---|---|
| "İstersen" | Türkçe Top 20 | 1 |

== Release history ==
| Country | Date | Format(s) | Label |
|---|---|---|---|
| Worldwide | 30 October 2015 | digital download | Sony |
