= List of number-one hits of 2007 (Turkey) =

List of songs that reach number one in Türkçe Top 20, the Turkish airplay chart in 2007. The list is updated every Thursday by Nielsen Music Control.

Date	Single	Artist
1 January	"Hayırdır İnşallah"	Yaşar
8 January	"Hayırdır İnşallah"	Yaşar
15 January	"Hayırdır İnşallah"	Yaşar
22 January	"Hayırdır İnşallah"	Yaşar
29 January	"Hayırdır İnşallah"	Yaşar
5 February	"Hayırdır İnşallah"	Yaşar
12 February	"Hayırdır İnşallah"	Yaşar
19 February	"Hayırdır İnşallah"	Yaşar
26 February	"Aşk Bitti"	Keremcem
5 March	"Aşk Bitti"	Keremcem
12 March	"Aşk Bitti"	Keremcem
19 March	"Aşk Bitti"	Keremcem
26 March	"Cennet"	Ferhat Göçer
2 April	"Cennet"	Ferhat Göçer
9 April	"Cennet"	Ferhat Göçer
16 April	"Böyle Kahpedir Dünya"	Gripin
23 April	"Böyle Kahpedir Dünya"	Gripin
30 April	"Bu Mudur?"	Nil Karaibrahimgil
7 May	"Bu Mudur?"	Nil Karaibrahimgil
14 May	"Bu Mudur?"	Nil Karaibrahimgil
21 May	"Bu Mudur?"	Nil Karaibrahimgil
28 May	"Bu Mudur?"	Nil Karaibrahimgil
4 June	"Bu Mudur?"	Nil Karaibrahimgil
11 June	"Komple"	Burak Kut
18 June	"Komple"	Burak Kut
25 June	"Komple"	Burak Kut
2 July	"Kibir"	Hande Yener
9 July	"İndir"	Mustafa Sandal
16 July	"İndir"	Mustafa Sandal
23 July	"İndir"	Mustafa Sandal
30 July	"İndir"	Mustafa Sandal
6 August	"İndir"	Mustafa Sandal
13 August	"İndir"	Mustafa Sandal
20 August	"İndir"	Mustafa Sandal
27 August	"İndir"	Mustafa Sandal
3 September	"İndir"	Mustafa Sandal
10 September	"Romeo"	Hande Yener
17 September	"Romeo"	Hande Yener
24 September	"Romeo"	Hande Yener
1 October	"Tövbeliyim"	Gökhan Özen
8 October	"Tövbeliyim"	Gökhan Özen
15 October	"Sükut-u Hayal"	Nev
22 October	"Sükut-u Hayal"	Nev
29 October	"Sükut-u Hayal"	Nev
5 November	"...Dan Sonra"	Sıla & Kenan Doğulu
12 November	"...Dan Sonra"	Sıla & Kenan Doğulu
19 November	"...Dan Sonra"	Sıla & Kenan Doğulu
26 November	"...Dan Sonra"	Sıla & Kenan Doğulu
1 December	"...Dan Sonra"	Sıla & Kenan Doğulu
8 December	"...Dan Sonra"	Sıla & Kenan Doğulu
15 December	"...Dan Sonra"	Sıla & Kenan Doğulu
22 December	"...Dan Sonra"	Sıla & Kenan Doğulu
29 December	"...Dan Sonra"	Sıla & Kenan Doğulu
