= List of number-one songs of 2012 (Turkey) =

This is the complete list of number-one singles in Turkey in 2012 according to the RadiomonitorTR.

== Chart history ==
Date reached number one	Song	Artist(s)
5 January	Oflaya Oflaya	Burcu Güneş
12 January	Oflaya Oflaya	Burcu Güneş
19 January	Oflaya Oflaya	Burcu Güneş
26 January	Oflaya Oflaya	Burcu Güneş
2 February	Oflaya Oflaya	Burcu Güneş
9 February	Oflaya Oflaya	Burcu Güneş
16 February	Kalamam Arkadaş	Murat Boz
23 February	Oflaya Oflaya	Burcu Güneş
1 March	Boş Bardak	Fettah Can
8 March	Boş Bardak	Fettah Can
15 March	Boş Bardak	Fettah Can
22 March	Boş Bardak	Fettah Can
29 March	Senden Sonra	Rafet El Roman
5 April	Senden Sonra	Rafet El Roman
12 April	Senden Sonra	Rafet El Roman
19 April	Senden Sonra	Rafet El Roman
26 April	Es	Mustafa Ceceli
3 May	Senden Sonra	Rafet El Roman
10 May	Soğuk Odalar	Emre Aydın and Gülden Mutlu
17 May	Soğuk Odalar	Emre Aydın and Gülden Mutlu
24 May	Soğuk Odalar	Emre Aydın and Gülden Mutlu
31 May	Soğuk Odalar	Emre Aydın and Gülden Mutlu
7 June	Sudan Sebep	Emir
14 June	Soğuk Odalar	Emre Aydın and Gülden Mutlu
21 June	Soğuk Odalar	Emre Aydın and Gülden Mutlu
28 June	Soğuk Odalar	Emre Aydın and Gülden Mutlu
5 July	Bir Güzellik Yap	Murat Dalkılıç
12 July	Bir Güzellik Yap	Murat Dalkılıç
19 July	Bir Güzellik Yap	Murat Dalkılıç
26 July	Aşk Gitti Bizden	Ozan Çolakoğlu and Tarkan
2 August	Aşk Gitti Bizden	Ozan Çolakoğlu and Tarkan
9 August	Aşk Gitti Bizden	Ozan Çolakoğlu and Tarkan
16 August	Bitmesin	Gökhan Türkmen
23 August	Bitmesin	Gökhan Türkmen
30 August	Bitmesin	Gökhan Türkmen
6 September	Bitmesin	Gökhan Türkmen
13 September	Bitmesin	Gökhan Türkmen
20 September	Bitmesin	Gökhan Türkmen
27 September	Bitmesin	Gökhan Türkmen
4 October	Bitmesin	Gökhan Türkmen
11 October	Bitmesin	Gökhan Türkmen
18 October	Bitmesin	Gökhan Türkmen
25 October	Dağılmak İstiyorum	Ozan Doğulu and Model
1 November	Dağılmak İstiyorum	Ozan Doğulu and Model
8 November	Dağılmak İstiyorum	Ozan Doğulu and Model
15 November	Dağılmak İstiyorum	Ozan Doğulu and Model
22 November	Dağılmak İstiyorum	Ozan Doğulu and Model
29 November	Beni Biraz Böyle Hatırla	Emre Aydın
6 December	Beni Biraz Böyle Hatırla	Emre Aydın
13 December	Dağılmak İstiyorum	Ozan Doğulu and Model
20 December	Dağılmak İstiyorum	Ozan Doğulu and Model
27 December	Lüzümsuz Savaş	Murat Dalkılıç
