= Yurtseven =

Yurtseven, meaning "patriotic", is a Turkish word, and it may refer to:

- Ömer Yurtseven (born 1998), Turkish professional basketball player
- Yurtseven Kardeşler, former Turkish music band of two siblings in Germany
