= List of number-one songs of 2015 (Turkey) =

This is the complete list of number-one singles in Turkey in 2015 according to the Radiomonitor. The list on the left side of the box (Resmi Liste, "the Official List") represents physical and digital track sales as well as music streaming of the Turkish artists, and the one on the right side (Yabancı Liste, "the Foreign List") represents the same thing for foreign artists.

== Chart history ==
| Date | Song (National) | Artist (National) | Song (Foreign) | Artist (Foreign) |
|---|---|---|---|---|
| 2 January | İyisin Tabi | Deniz Seki | Dangerous | David Guetta feat. Sam Martin |
| 8 January | İyisin Tabi | Deniz Seki | Dangerous | David Guetta feat. Sam Martin |
| 15 January | Gelsen De Anlatsam | Gökhan Tepe | Dangerous | David Guetta feat. Sam Martin |
| 22 January | Gelsen De Anlatsam | Gökhan Tepe | Dangerous | David Guetta feat. Sam Martin |
| 29 January | Gelsen De Anlatsam | Gökhan Tepe | Dangerous | David Guetta feat. Sam Martin |
| 5 February | Gelsen De Anlatsam | Gökhan Tepe | Dangerous | David Guetta feat. Sam Martin |
| 12 February | Sen İstanbul'sun | Gökhan Türkmen | Dangerous | David Guetta feat. Sam Martin |
| 19 February | Sen İstanbul'sun | Gökhan Türkmen | Dangerous | David Guetta feat. Sam Martin |
| 26 February | Sen İstanbul'sun | Gökhan Türkmen | Dangerous | David Guetta feat. Sam Martin |
| 5 March | Sen İstanbul'sun | Gökhan Türkmen | Uptown Funk | Mark Ronson feat. Bruno Mars |
| 12 March | Gelsen De Anlatsam | Gökhan Tepe | Uptown Funk | Mark Ronson feat. Bruno Mars |
| 19 March | Gelsen De Anlatsam | Gökhan Tepe | All I Need | Brianna |
| 26 March | Gelsen De Anlatsam | Gökhan Tepe | All I Need | Brianna |
| 2 April | Sebastian | Hande Yener (feat. Volga Tamöz) | Are You with Me | Lost Frequencies |
| 9 April | Sebastian | Hande Yener (feat. Volga Tamöz) | Are You with Me | Lost Frequencies |
| 16 April | Sebastian | Hande Yener (feat. Volga Tamöz) | Are You with Me | Lost Frequencies |
| 24 April | Hediye | Sıla | Are You with Me | Lost Frequencies |
| 30 April | Hediye | Sıla | Are You with Me | Lost Frequencies |
| 7 May | Bangır Bangır | Gülşen | Are You with Me | Lost Frequencies |
| 14 May | Bangır Bangır | Gülşen | Are You with Me | Lost Frequencies |
| 21 May | Bangır Bangır | Gülşen | Worth It | Fifth Harmony feat. Kid Ink |
| 28 May | Bangır Bangır | Gülşen | Worth It | Fifth Harmony feat. Kid Ink |
| 4 June | Bangır Bangır | Gülşen | Hey Mama | David Guetta feat. Nicki Minaj, Bebe Rexha and Afrojack |
| 11 June | Bangır Bangır | Gülşen | Hey Mama | David Guetta feat. Nicki Minaj, Bebe Rexha and Afrojack |
| 18 June | Bangır Bangır | Gülşen | Hey Mama | David Guetta feat. Nicki Minaj, Bebe Rexha and Afrojack |
| 25 June | Bangır Bangır | Gülşen | Lean On | Major Lazer and DJ Snake feat. MØ |
| 2 July | Bangır Bangır | Gülşen | Hey Mama | David Guetta feat. Nicki Minaj, Bebe Rexha and Afrojack |
| 10 July | Bangır Bangır | Gülşen | Hey Mama | David Guetta feat. Nicki Minaj, Bebe Rexha and Afrojack |
| 21 July | Bangır Bangır | Gülşen | Hey Mama | David Guetta feat. Nicki Minaj, Bebe Rexha and Afrojack |
| 24 July | Yaz Günü | Hadise | Hey Mama | David Guetta feat. Nicki Minaj, Bebe Rexha and Afrojack |
| 31 July | Bangır Bangır | Gülşen | Hey Mama | David Guetta feat. Nicki Minaj, Bebe Rexha and Afrojack |
| 7 August | Bangır Bangır | Gülşen | Hey Mama | David Guetta feat. Nicki Minaj, Bebe Rexha and Afrojack |
| 14 August | Miş Miş | Simge | Hey Mama | David Guetta feat. Nicki Minaj, Bebe Rexha and Afrojack |
| 21 August | Miş Miş | Simge | Hey Mama | David Guetta feat. Nicki Minaj, Bebe Rexha and Afrojack |
| 31 August | Miş Miş | Simge | You Know You Like It | DJ Snake and AlunaGeorge |
| 4 September | Miş Miş | Simge | You Know You Like It | DJ Snake and AlunaGeorge |
| 11 September | Sarışın | Mabel Matiz | You Know You Like It | DJ Snake and AlunaGeorge |
| 18 September | Sarışın | Mabel Matiz | You Know You Like It | DJ Snake and AlunaGeorge |
| 26 September | Sarışın | Mabel Matiz | You Know You Like It | DJ Snake and AlunaGeorge |
| 2 October | Sarışın | Mabel Matiz | You Know You Like It | DJ Snake and AlunaGeorge |
| 9 October | Sana N'olmuş | Betül Demir | You Know You Like It | DJ Snake and AlunaGeorge |
| 16 October | Sarışın | Mabel Matiz | How Deep Is Your Love | Calvin Harris and Disciples |
| 23 October | İstersen | Buray | How Deep Is Your Love | Calvin Harris and Disciples |
| 30 October | İstersen | Buray | How Deep Is Your Love | Calvin Harris and Disciples |
| 6 November | İstersen | Buray | How Deep Is Your Love | Calvin Harris and Disciples |
| 13 November | İstersen | Buray | How Deep Is Your Love | Calvin Harris and Disciples |
| 20 November | İstersen | Buray | How Deep Is Your Love | Calvin Harris and Disciples |
| 27 November | Yapboz | Emre Kaya | How Deep Is Your Love | Calvin Harris and Disciples |
| 4 December | Yapboz | Emre Kaya | How Deep Is Your Love | Calvin Harris and Disciples |
| 11 December | Yapboz | Emre Kaya | How Deep Is Your Love | Calvin Harris and Disciples |
| 18 December | Yapboz | Emre Kaya | Don't Be So Shy (Filatov & Karas Remix) | Imany ft. Filatov & Karas |
| 25 December | Yapboz | Emre Kaya | Hello | Adele |
