= 1 Şişe Aşk =

2015 album by Buray

Studio album by Buray
- Released: 14 August 2015
- Genre: Pop
- Length: 30:31
- Label: Sony Music

Buray chronology
1 Şişe Aşk (2015)	İstersen Remixes (2015)

1 Şişe Aşk (1 Bottle of Love) is the first studio album by Cypriot-Turkish singer Buray. It was released on 14 August 2015 by Sony Music.

== Release and content ==
1 Şişe Aşk is Buray's first album. It contains 8 songs in total. Bahadır Tanrıvermiş served as the album's music director. All of the pieces in the album were written by Gözde Ançel, and composed by Buray together with Ançel. Buray arranged all of the songs in the album.

Buray explained the production of the album as follows: "My album 1 Şişe Aşk is a result of a 2-year project. Out of hundreds of compositions that we prepared, I chose the ones that were close to my own style and kneaded with my own soul. All of the arrangements were done by me. The lyrics are by Gözde Ançel, and most of the music was made through our collaboration with Gözde. At first, I had no intention of making an album. I had a very enjoyable way of life in Australia and I didn't want to leave it at first. 2 years ago I felt the right time was coming and I let the events flow."

== Track listing ==
1 Şişe Aşk
No.	Title	Writer(s)	Composer(s)	Length
1.	"İstersen"	Gözde Ançel	Buray · Gözde Ançel	3:44
2.	"Ben Akıllanmam"	Gözde Ançel	Buray · Gözde Ançel	3:32
3.	"Alacalı"	Gözde Ançel	Buray · Gözde Ançel	4:18
4.	"Ara Sıra Ara"	Gözde Ançel	Buray · Gözde Ançel	3:55
5.	"Gitmem Gerek"	Gözde Ançel	Buray · Gözde Ançel	4:14
6.	"Sonsuz Kılalım"	Gözde Ançel	Buray · Gözde Ançel	3:41
7.	"Sen Sevda Mısın"	Gözde Ançel	Buray · Gözde Ançel	3:37
8.	"Kimsenin Suçu Yok"	Gözde Ançel	Buray · Gözde Ançel	3:30
Total length:				30:31

== Personnel ==
- Music director: Bahadır Tanrıvermiş
- Arrangements: Buray Hoşsöz
- Mastering: Martin Pullen
- Mixing: Evripides Evripidou (1), Arzu Aslan (2,3), Buray Hoşsöz (4), Kudret Bayram (5,5,7,8)
- Guitars: Serhan Yasdıman (2)
- Bass guitar: Birkan Şener (2,3,6,7,8), Arif Ulusoy (5)
- Bowed string instruments: Gündem Yaylı Grubu (3,5,6)
- Bowed string instruments orchestration: Halil Er (3,5,6)
- Clarinet: Onur Gedik (7)
- Solo violoncello: Gürhan Nuray (2,5)
- Graphic design: Melek Boçoğlu Yılmaz
- Photographs: Gazi Photography (Melbourne)
- Contact: Gamze Sakallılar

Credits adapted from 1 Şişe Aşk's album booklet.

== Charts ==
Single	Chart (2015)	Peak position
"İstersen"	MusicTopTR Official Chart	1
"Sen Sevda Mısın"	MusicTopTR Official Chart	1

== Release history ==
Country	Date	Format(s)	Label
Turkey	14 August 2015	CD · Digital download	Sony
Worldwide	14 August 2015	Digital download	Sony
