= İlyas Yalçıntaş =

Turkish singer-songwriter

- Born: 7 March 1989 (age 37); Erzincan, Turkey
- Genre: Pop
- Occupation: Singer-songwriter
- Instrument: Guitar
- Years active: 2014–present
- Label: DMC

İlyas Yalçıntaş (born 7 March 1989) is a Turkish singer-songwriter.

== Life and career ==
Yalçıntaş was born on 7 March 1989 in Erzincan, Eastern Turkey. He is a graduate of Küçükçekmece İMKB Anatolian High School. His breakthrough came in 2014, when he took part in X Factor Türkiye as a contestant, performing the song "İncir", written and composed by his friends İskender Külekçi and Orçun Karamuk. In 2015, he released a new version of the song, rearranged by Behzat Gerçeker & Enbe Orkestrası. The song managed to top Kral Pop and TTNet Müzik charts in Turkey.

After releasing "İncir" as a single in 2015, he released the song "Olmazsa Olmazımsın", for which again he worked with Enbe Orkestrası and Büşra Periz. In 2016, he released his first official album İçimdeki Duman, which consists of the songs that he previously published in 2015. The songs "İncir", "Olmazsa Olmazımsın", "Nefes" and "İçimdeki Duman", and "Bu Nasıl Veda" were all turned into music videos to further promote the album. In May 2018, his duet with Feride Hilal Akın was released under the title "Şehrin Yolu". The song was written by Yalçıntaş and composed by him and Emre Can Yıldız.

In December 2023, Yalçıntaş announced that he had been diagnosed with Ramsay Hunt syndrome.

Yalçıntaş was taken into custody as part of a drug operation on 16 July 2026 and was arrested on the same day.

== Discography ==
=== Albums ===
- İçimdeki Duman (2016)

=== Singles ===
- "Gel Be Gökyüzüm" (2017)
- "Yağmur" (feat. Aytaç Kart) (2018)
- "Şehrin Yolu" (feat. Feride Hilal Akın) (2018)
- "Bilmece" (2018)
- "Neredesin Sen" (2019)
- "Kirli Kadeh" (2019)
- "Farzet" (2019)
- "Olur Olur" (2020)
- "Dünya Senin" (2020)
- "Kalbimin Kapısı" (2020)
- "Dönme" (2021)
- "Mecnun" (feat. Enbe Orkestrası) (2021)
- "Adım Adım" (feat. Ezgi Kosa) (2021)
- "Darmadağın" (2021)
- "Rüzgarım Seninle Esse" (2022)
- "Mask" (feat. Farzad Farzin) (2022)
- "Resim" (feat. Faruk Sabancı) (from the album Serdar Ortaç Şarkıları, Vol. 1) (2022)
- "Aşk Tohumu" (feat. Alper Atakan) (2022)
- "Masal" (2022)
- "Hiç Unutma" (with Sinan Akçıl) (from the album Piyanist 3 (Next Generation)) (2023)
- "Yasak Elma" (2023)
- "Sorma" (2023)
- "Şahit" (with Ece Mumay) (2024)
- "Hüzün" (from the album Bülent Özdemir Şarkıları) (2024)
- "Yol Arkadaşım" (2024)
- "Kadınım" (feat. Anıl Şallıel) (2024)
- "İstanbul'da" (2024)
- "Sessiz Fırtına" (2025)
- "Sana Bu Hikaye" (2025)

== Awards ==
Year	Award	Category
2015	42nd Golden Butterfly Awards	Best Debut by a Soloist
2016	3rd En Moda Magazine Awards	Best Song of the Year (İncir)
2016	Istanbul Gelisim University Media Awards	Best Cover Song (Nefes)

== See also ==
- Turkish pop music
