= List of number-one songs of 2020 (Turkey) =

This is the complete list of number-one singles in Turkey in 2020 according to Radiomonitor. The list on the left side of the box (Resmi Liste, "the Official List") represents physical and digital track sales as well as music streaming of the Turkish artists, and the one on the right side (Uluslararası Liste, "the International List") the same thing for non-Turkish artists.

== Chart history ==
=== Weekly charts ===
Date	Song (Official)	Artist (Official)	Song (International)	Artist (International)
3 January	Mod	Zeynep Bastık and Mustafa Sandal	Dance Monkey	Tones and I
10 January	Mod	Zeynep Bastık and Mustafa Sandal	Dance Monkey	Tones and I
17 January	Vur Kaç	Tuğba Yurt	Dance Monkey	Tones and I
24 January	Daha İyi	Hande Ünsal	Dance Monkey	Tones and I
31 January	Mod	Zeynep Bastık and Mustafa Sandal	Ride It	Regard
7 February	Daha İyi	Hande Ünsal	Ride It	Regard
14 February	Daha İyi	Hande Ünsal	Dance Monkey	Tones and I
21 February	Daha İyi	Hande Ünsal	Ayy Macarena	Tyga
28 February	(Not published)			
6 March	Daha İyi	Hande Ünsal	Elefante	NK
13 March	Daha İyi	Hande Ünsal	Dance Monkey	Tones and I
20 March	Daha İyi	Hande Ünsal	Dance Monkey	Tones and I
28 March	Daha İyi	Hande Ünsal	Roses	Saint Jhn
3 April	Daha İyi	Hande Ünsal	Further Up (Na, Na, Na, Na, Na)	Static & Ben El (ft. Pitbull)
10 April	İki Hece	Berkay	Roses	Saint Jhn
17 April	Firardayım	Gökhan Özen	Roses	Saint Jhn
24 April	Firardayım	Gökhan Özen	Roses	Saint Jhn
30 April	Firardayım	Gökhan Özen	Roses	Saint Jhn
8 May	Mahzen	Özgün	Roses	Saint Jhn
15 May	Mahzen	Özgün	Roses	Saint Jhn
22 May	Ya Sabır	Yalın	Roses	Saint Jhn
29 May	Ya Sabır	Yalın	Roses	Saint Jhn
5 June	Ya Sabır	Yalın	Elefante; Roses	NK, Saint Jhn
12 June	Her Mevsim Yazım	Zeynep Bastık	Roses	Saint Jhn
19 June	Her Mevsim Yazım	Zeynep Bastık	Roses	Saint Jhn
26 June	Her Mevsim Yazım	Zeynep Bastık	ily (i love you baby)	Surf Mesa and Emilee
3 July	Kendime Sardım	Oğuzhan Koç	ily (i love you baby)	Surf Mesa and Emilee
10 July	Kendime Sardım	Oğuzhan Koç	ily (i love you baby)	Surf Mesa and Emilee
17 July	Kendime Sardım	Oğuzhan Koç	Breaking Me	Topic and A7S
24 July	Kendime Sardım	Oğuzhan Koç	Breaking Me	Topic and A7S
31 July	Kendime Sardım	Oğuzhan Koç	Breaking Me	Topic and A7S
7 August	Kendime Sardım	Oğuzhan Koç	Mamacita	Black Eyed Peas, Ozuna and J. Rey Soul
14 August	Kendime Sardım	Oğuzhan Koç	Don't Rush	Young T & Bugsey ft. Headie One
21 August	Kendime Sardım	Oğuzhan Koç	Mamacita	Black Eyed Peas, Ozuna and J. Rey Soul
28 August	Cennetten Çiçek	Zehra	Mamacita	Black Eyed Peas, Ozuna and J. Rey Soul
4 September	Bir Daha	Zeynep Bastık	Mamacita	Black Eyed Peas, Ozuna and J. Rey Soul
11 September	Kalbim Tatilde	Ziynet Sali	Mamacita	Black Eyed Peas, Ozuna and J. Rey Soul
18 September	Kalbim Tatilde	Ziynet Sali	Mamacita	Black Eyed Peas, Ozuna and J. Rey Soul
25 September	Kalbim Tatilde	Ziynet Sali	Mamacita	Black Eyed Peas, Ozuna and J. Rey Soul
2 October	Kalbim Tatilde	Ziynet Sali	Don't Rush	Young T & Bugsey (ft. Headie One)
9 October	Kalbim Tatilde	Ziynet Sali	VIDA LOCA	Black Eyed Peas (with Nicky Jam and Tyga)
16 October	Heyecandan	Oğuzhan Koç	VIDA LOCA	Black Eyed Peas (with Nicky Jam and Tyga)
23 October	Heyecandan	Oğuzhan Koç	VIDA LOCA	Black Eyed Peas (with Nicky Jam and Tyga)
30 October	Damar	Mustafa Sandal	VIDA LOCA	Black Eyed Peas (with Nicky Jam and Tyga)
6 November	Damar	Mustafa Sandal	Take You Dancing	Jason Derulo
13 November	Kalbim Tatilde	Ziynet Sali	Daisy	Ashnikko
20 November	Damar	Mustafa Sandal	Take You Dancing	Jason Derulo
27 November	Damar	Mustafa Sandal	Take You Dancing	Jason Derulo
4 December	Toy	Mabel Matiz	Take You Dancing	Jason Derulo
11 December	Damar	Mustafa Sandal	Take You Dancing	Jason Derulo
18 December	Toy	Mabel Matiz	Take You Dancing	Jason Derulo
25 December	Bir Sebebi Var	İkilem	Take You Dancing	Jason Derulo

=== Year-end chart ===
Song (Official)	Artist (Official)	Song (International)	Artist (International)
Mahzen	Özgün	Roses	Saint Jhn
