= List of number-one songs of 2019 (Turkey) =

This is the complete list of number-one singles in Turkey in 2019 according to Radiomonitor. The list on the left side of the box (Resmi Liste, "the Official List") represents physical and digital track sales as well as music streaming of the Turkish artists, and the one on the right side (Yabancı Liste, "the Foreign List") represents the same thing for foreign artists.

== Chart history ==
Date	Song (National)	Artist (National)	Song (International)	Artist (International)
4 January	Bir İhtimal Biliyorum	Gülşen	Taki Taki	DJ Snake ft. Selena Gomez, Ozuna and Cardi B
11 January	Bir İhtimal Biliyorum	Gülşen	Taki Taki	DJ Snake ft. Selena Gomez, Ozuna and Cardi B
18 January	Bir İhtimal Biliyorum	Gülşen	Taki Taki	DJ Snake ft. Selena Gomez, Ozuna and Cardi B
25 January	Bir İhtimal Biliyorum	Gülşen	Taki Taki	DJ Snake ft. Selena Gomez, Ozuna and Cardi B
1 February	Bir İhtimal Biliyorum	Gülşen	Taki Taki	DJ Snake ft. Selena Gomez, Ozuna and Cardi B
8 February	Bir İhtimal Biliyorum	Gülşen	Taki Taki	DJ Snake ft. Selena Gomez, Ozuna and Cardi B
15 February	Bir İhtimal Biliyorum	Gülşen	Sugar & Brownies	Dharia
22 February	Bir İhtimal Biliyorum	Gülşen	Sugar & Brownies	Dharia
1 March	Bir İhtimal Biliyorum	Gülşen	Sugar & Brownies	Dharia
8 March	Bir İhtimal Biliyorum	Gülşen	Sugar & Brownies	Dharia
15 March	Bir İhtimal Biliyorum	Gülşen	Sugar & Brownies	Dharia
22 March	Bir İhtimal Biliyorum	Gülşen	Sugar & Brownies	Dharia
29 March	Bir İhtimal Biliyorum	Gülşen	Sugar & Brownies	Dharia
5 April	Bu da Geçecek	Göksel	Con Calma	Daddy Yankee ft. Snow
12 April	Bana da Söyle	Ziynet Sali	Con Calma	Daddy Yankee ft. Snow
19 April	Bana da Söyle	Ziynet Sali	Con Calma	Daddy Yankee ft. Snow
26 April	Bana da Söyle	Ziynet Sali	Con Calma	Daddy Yankee ft. Snow
3 May	Bana da Söyle	Ziynet Sali	Con Calma	Daddy Yankee ft. Snow
10 May	Bana da Söyle	Ziynet Sali	Con Calma	Daddy Yankee ft. Snow
17 May	Bize Deva Sevişler	Yalın	Con Calma	Daddy Yankee ft. Snow
24 May	Nasıl Diye Sorma	Emre Kaya	Con Calma	Daddy Yankee ft. Snow
31 May	Nasıl Diye Sorma	Emre Kaya	Con Calma	Daddy Yankee ft. Snow
7 June	Devlerin Aşkı Büyük Olur	Betül Demir	Con Calma	Daddy Yankee ft. Snow
14 June	Devlerin Aşkı Büyük Olur	Betül Demir	Con Calma	Daddy Yankee ft. Snow
21 June	Devlerin Aşkı Büyük Olur	Betül Demir	Con Calma	Daddy Yankee ft. Snow
28 June	Nasıl Diye Sorma	Emre Kaya	Con Calma	Daddy Yankee ft. Snow
5 July	Devlerin Aşkı Büyük Olur	Betül Demir	R.I.P.	Sofía Reyes ft. Rita Ora and Anitta
12 July	(Not published)			
19 July	Devlerin Aşkı Büyük Olur	Betül Demir	R.I.P.	Sofía Reyes
26 July	Nerdesin?	Hande Ünsal	R.I.P.	Sofía Reyes
2 August	Nerdesin?	Hande Ünsal	R.I.P.	Sofía Reyes
9 August	(Not published)			
16 August	Nerdesin?	Hande Ünsal	Bad Guy	Billie Eilish
23 August	Nerdesin?	Hande Ünsal	Bad Guy	Billie Eilish
30 August	(Not published)			
6 September	Nerdesin?	Hande Ünsal	Dheeme Dheeme	Tony Kakkar
13 September	Hiç Yok	Göksel	Señorita	Shawn Mendes and Camila Cabello
20 September	Hiç Yok	Göksel	Señorita	Shawn Mendes and Camila Cabello
27 September	Nerdesin?	Hande Ünsal	LALALA	Y2K and Bbno$
4 October	Nerdesin?	Hande Ünsal	LALALA	Y2K and Bbno$
11 October	Hiç Yok	Göksel	LALALA	Y2K and Bbno$
18 October	Nerdesin?	Hande Ünsal	LALALA	Y2K and Bbno$
25 Osctober	Daha Bi' Aşık	Ayla Çelik	LALALA	Y2K and Bbno$
1 November	Daha Bi' Aşık	Ayla Çelik	LALALA	Y2K and Bbno$
8 November	Daha Bi' Aşık	Ayla Çelik	Dance Monkey	Tones and I
15 November	Bedel	Mustafa Ceceli	Dance Monkey	Tones and I
22 November	Yaramızda Kalsın	Merve Özbey	Dance Monkey	Tones and I
29 November	Mod	Mustafa Sandal and Zeynep Bastık	Dance Monkey	Tones and I
6 December	Mod	Mustafa Sandal and Zeynep Bastık	Dance Monkey	Tones and I
13 December	Mod	Mustafa Sandal and Zeynep Bastık	Dance Monkey	Tones and I
20 December	Mod	Mustafa Sandal and Zeynep Bastık	Dance Monkey	Tones and I
27 December	Mod	Mustafa Sandal and Zeynep Bastık	Dance Monkey	Tones and I
