= List of number-one songs of 2011 (Turkey) =

This is the complete list of number-one singles in Turkey in 2011 according to the RadiomonitorTR.

== Chart history ==
| Date | Song | Artist(s) |
|---|---|---|
| 6 January | Acısa da Öldürmez | Sıla |
| 13 January | Acısa da Öldürmez | Sıla |
| 20 January | Acısa da Öldürmez | Sıla |
| 27 January | Eksik | Mustafa Ceceli and Elvan Günaydın |
| 3 February | Eksik | Mustafa Ceceli and Elvan Günaydın |
| 10 February | Eksik | Mustafa Ceceli and Elvan Günaydın |
| 17 February | Eksik | Mustafa Ceceli and Elvan Günaydın |
| 24 February | Sen ve Ben | Funda Arar |
| 3 March | Sen ve Ben | Funda Arar |
| 10 March | Sen ve Ben | Funda Arar |
| 17 March | Sen ve Ben | Funda Arar |
| 24 March | Sen ve Ben | Funda Arar |
| 31 March | Sen ve Ben | Funda Arar |
| 7 April | Sen ve Ben | Funda Arar |
| 14 April | Sen ve Ben | Funda Arar |
| 21 April | Budur | Atiye |
| 28 April | Budur | Atiye |
| 5 May | Budur | Atiye |
| 12 May | Budur | Atiye |
| 19 May | Budur | Atiye |
| 26 May | Yeni Biri | Gülşen |
| 2 June | Direniyorum | Rafet El Roman |
| 9 June | Direniyorum | Rafet El Roman |
| 16 June | Direniyorum | Rafet El Roman |
| 23 June | Direniyorum | Rafet El Roman |
| 30 June | Kafa | Sıla |
| 7 July | Kafa | Sıla |
| 14 July | Kafa | Sıla |
| 21 July | Direniyorum | Rafet El Roman |
| 28 July | Şıkır Şıkır | Gülben Ergen and Mustafa Sandal |
| 4 August | Şıkır Şıkır | Gülben Ergen and Mustafa Sandal |
| 11 August | Şıkır Şıkır | Gülben Ergen and Mustafa Sandal |
| 18 August | Tuttu Fırlattı | Gökçe |
| 25 August | Tuttu Fırlattı | Gökçe |
| 1 September | Tuttu Fırlattı | Gökçe |
| 8 September | Tuttu Fırlattı | Gökçe |
| 15 September | Tuttu Fırlattı | Gökçe |
| 22 September | Sözde Ayrılık | Gülşen |
| 29 September | Sözde Ayrılık | Gülşen |
| 6 October | Sözde Ayrılık | Gülşen |
| 13 October | Sözde Ayrılık | Gülşen |
| 20 October | Hep Yaşın 19 | MFÖ |
| 27 October | Boş Yere | Sıla |
| 3 November | Hep Yaşın 19 | MFÖ |
| 10 November | Geri Dönüş Olsa | Murat Boz |
| 17 November | Boş Yere | Sıla |
| 24 November | Boş Yere | Sıla |
| 1 December | Boş Yere | Sıla |
| 8 December | Oflaya Oflaya | Burcu Güneş |
| 15 December | Oflaya Oflaya | Burcu Güneş |
| 22 December | Oflaya Oflaya | Burcu Güneş |
| 29 December | Oflaya Oflaya | Burcu Güneş |
