= Feride Hilal Akın =

Turkish singer, songwriter and actress

- Born: 8 March 1996 (age 29); Istanbul, Turkey
- Genres: Pop; R&B
- Occupations: Singer; songwriter; actress
- Instrument: Vocals
- Years active: 2017–present
- Labels: DMC

Feride Hilal Akın (born 8 March 1996) is a Turkish pop singer, songwriter and actress.

Akın, who was raised in Ankara, finished her high school there. She started performing on stage at the age of 17. Her breakthrough came through duets with singers such as İlyas Yalçıntaş. Meanwhile, she was also cast in Show TV's series Yeni Gelin and portrayed the character of "Şirin". Her song "Yok Yok" charted many music charts in Turkey and received a nomination at the Golden Butterfly Awards as the Best Song of the Year. In 2020, she collaborated with Buray and KÖK$VL on the song "Rampapapam".

== Discography ==
=== Singles ===
Singles
Years	Title
2017	Bilir Mi? (ft. Enbe Orkestrası)
2017	Ayrılık Zor (ft. Onur Baytan)
2017	İmkansız Aşk (ft. Onur Baytan & Halil İbrahim Kurum)
2018	Gizli Aşk(ft. Hakan Tunçbilek)
2018	Şehrin Yolu (ft. İlyas Yalçıntaş)
2019	Yok Yok
2019	Kim
2019	Tutku
2020	Rampapapam (ft. Buray & KÖK$VL)
2020	Zehir Delisi
2020	Yağmurlar
2020	Bal (ft. Beko)
2021	Dedikodu
2021	Deprem Gibi (ft. Doğuş Çabakçor)
2021	İstanbul'da Aşk (ft. Sheyh Ree)
2022	Elimde Duran Fotoğrafın (Saygı Albümü: Bergen)
2022	Lay Low (ft. Montiego, Matthew Bento)
2022	Soygun
2023	Can (ft. Murat Dalkılıç)
2023	Filme Gel
2023	Bunca Yıl
2023	Susmadı
2023	Seni Gidi Seni
2024	MATRIX432HZ

== Filmography ==
=== TV series ===
Year	Title	Role	Ref
2017–18	Yeni Gelin	Şirin	
2018	Kafalar Karışık	Buse	
2023	Aşkın Saati: 19.03	Aslı	
