= List of number-one songs of 2010 (Turkey) =

This is the complete list of number-one singles in Turkey in 2010 according to the Nielsen Music Control.

== Chart history ==
Date	Number-one song	Artist	Notes and references
4 January	"Hastalıkta Sağlıkta"	Mustafa Ceceli	
11 January	"Hastalıkta Sağlıkta"	Mustafa Ceceli	
18 January	"Hastalıkta Sağlıkta"	Mustafa Ceceli	
25 January	"Bi' An Gel"	Gülşen	
1 February	"Bi' An Gel"	Gülşen	
8 February	"Bi' An Gel"	Gülşen	
15 February	"Çok Özlüyorum Seni"	Gökhan Tepe	
22 February	"Rüya"	Ziynet Sali	
1 March	"Rüya"	Ziynet Sali	
8 March	"Rüya"	Ziynet Sali	
15 March	"Rüya"	Ziynet Sali	
22 March	"Rüya"	Ziynet Sali	
29 March	"Bu Yağmurlar"	Emre Aydın	
5 April	"Bu Yağmurlar"	Emre Aydın	
12 April	"Bu Yağmurlar"	Emre Aydın	
19 April	"Bu Yağmurlar"	Emre Aydın	
26 April	"Bu Yağmurlar"	Emre Aydın	
3 May	"Bu Yağmurlar"	Emre Aydın	
10 May	"Bu Yağmurlar"	Emre Aydın	
17 May	"Durma Yağmur Durma"	Gripin	
24 May	"Üzüm"	Ferhat Göçer	
31 May	"Üzüm"	Ferhat Göçer	
7 June	"Üzüm"	Ferhat Göçer	
14 June	"Üzüm"	Ferhat Göçer	
21 June	"Üzüm"	Ferhat Göçer	
28 June	"Üzüm"	Ferhat Göçer	
5 July	"Üzüm"	Ferhat Göçer	
8 July	"Bodrum"	Hande Yener	
15 July	"Alain Delon"	Ozan Doğulu & Sıla	
22 July	"Alain Delon"	Ozan Doğulu & Sıla	
29 July	"Alain Delon"	Ozan Doğulu & Sıla	
5 August	"Alain Delon"	Ozan Doğulu & Sıla	
12 August	"Alain Delon"	Ozan Doğulu & Sıla	
19 August	"Alain Delon"	Ozan Doğulu & Sıla	
26 August	"Alain Delon"	Ozan Doğulu & Sıla	
2 September	"Alain Delon"	Ozan Doğulu & Sıla	
9 September	"Rengârenk"	Sertab Erener	
16 September	"Rengârenk"	Sertab Erener	
23 September	"Adımı Kalbine Yaz"	Tarkan	
30 September	"Rengârenk"	Sertab Erener	
7 October	"Rengârenk"	Sertab Erener	
14 October	"Öp"	Tarkan	
21 October	"Öp"	Tarkan	
28 October	"Öp"	Tarkan	
4 November	"Öp"	Tarkan	
11 November	"Öp"	Tarkan	
18 November	"Hoşçakal"	Emre Aydın	
25 November	"Hoşçakal"	Emre Aydın	
2 December	"Acısa da Öldürmez"	Sıla	
9 December	"Acısa da Öldürmez"	Sıla	
16 December	"Acısa da Öldürmez"	Sıla	
23 December	"Acısa da Öldürmez"	Sıla	
30 December	"Acısa da Öldürmez"	Sıla	
