= List of number-one songs of 2018 (Turkey) =

This is the complete list of number-one singles in Turkey in 2018 according to Radiomonitor. The list on the left side of the box (Resmi Liste, "the Official List") represents physical and digital track sales as well as music streaming of the Turkish artists, and the one on the right side (Yabancı Liste, "the Foreign List") represents the same thing for foreign artists.

== Chart history ==
| Date | Song (National) | Artist (National) | Song (International) | Artist (International) |
|---|---|---|---|---|
| 5 January | Beni Çok Sev | Tarkan | Havana | Camila Cabello feat. Young Thug |
| 12 January | Beni Çok Sev | Tarkan | Havana | Camila Cabello feat. Young Thug |
| 19 January | Beni Çok Sev | Tarkan | Dusk Till Dawn | Zayn feat. Sia |
| 26 January | Sinsirella | Aylin Coşkun | Dusk Till Dawn | Zayn feat. Sia |
| 2 February | Sinsirella | Aylin Coşkun | 6 Days | Mahmut Orhan |
| 9 February | Sinsirella | Aylin Coşkun | 6 Days | Mahmut Orhan |
| 16 February | Sinsirella | Aylin Coşkun | 6 Days | Mahmut Orhan |
| 23 February | Sinsirella | Aylin Coşkun | 6 Days | Mahmut Orhan |
| 2 March | Sinsirella | Aylin Coşkun | 6 Days | Mahmut Orhan |
| 9 March | Sinsirella | Aylin Coşkun | One By One | Deeperise feat. Jabber |
| 16 March | Öyle Kolaysa | Mabel Matiz | One By One | Deeperise feat. Jabber |
| 23 March | Öyle Kolaysa | Mabel Matiz | One By One | Deeperise feat. Jabber |
| 30 March | Öyle Kolaysa | Mabel Matiz | One By One | Deeperise feat. Jabber |
| 6 April | Öyle Kolaysa | Mabel Matiz | One By One | Deeperise feat. Jabber |
| 13 April | Öyle Kolaysa | Mabel Matiz | One By One | Deeperise feat. Jabber |
| 20 April | Öyle Kolaysa | Mabel Matiz | One By One | Deeperise feat. Jabber |
| 27 April | Öyle Kolaysa | Mabel Matiz | One By One | Deeperise feat. Jabber |
| 4 May | Roman | Edis | One By One | Deeperise feat. Jabber |
| 11 May | Roman | Edis | One By One | Deeperise feat. Jabber |
| 18 May | Roman | Edis | One By One | Deeperise feat. Jabber |
| 25 May | Roman | Edis | Mad Love | Sean Paul and David Guetta feat. Becky G |
| 1 June | Ne Münasebet | Derya Uluğ | Mad Love | Sean Paul and David Guetta feat. Becky G |
| 8 June | Manzara | Aylin Coşkun feat. Hande Yener | Mad Love | Sean Paul and David Guetta feat. Becky G |
| 15 June | (Not published) | | | |
| 22 June | Yalnız Çiçek | Emrah Karaduman feat. Aleyna Tilki | Mad Love | Sean Paul and David Guetta feat. Becky G |
| 29 June | Yalnız Çiçek | Emrah Karaduman feat. Aleyna Tilki | Mad Love | Sean Paul and David Guetta feat. Becky G |
| 6 July | Yalnız Çiçek | Emrah Karaduman feat. Aleyna Tilki | Flames | David Guetta and Sia |
| 13 July | Yalnız Çiçek | Emrah Karaduman feat. Aleyna Tilki | Flames | David Guetta and Sia |
| 20 July | Yalnız Çiçek | Emrah Karaduman feat. Aleyna Tilki | Flames | David Guetta and Sia |
| 27 July | Yalnız Çiçek | Emrah Karaduman feat. Aleyna Tilki | One Kiss | Calvin Harris and Dua Lipa |
| 3 August | Yalnız Çiçek | Emrah Karaduman feat. Aleyna Tilki | One Kiss | Calvin Harris and Dua Lipa |
| 10 August | Yalnız Çiçek | Emrah Karaduman feat. Aleyna Tilki | One Kiss | Calvin Harris and Dua Lipa |
| 17 August | Yalnız Çiçek | Emrah Karaduman feat. Aleyna Tilki | One Kiss | Calvin Harris and Dua Lipa |
| 24 August | Yalnız Çiçek | Emrah Karaduman feat. Aleyna Tilki | One Kiss | Calvin Harris and Dua Lipa |
| 31 August | Yalnız Çiçek | Emrah Karaduman feat. Aleyna Tilki | Solo | Clean Bandit feat. Demi Lovato |
| 7 September | Sensiz Ben Ne Olayım | Yalın | Solo | Clean Bandit feat. Demi Lovato |
| 14 September | Reset | Mustafa Sandal feat. Eypio | Solo | Clean Bandit feat. Demi Lovato |
| 21 September | Reset | Mustafa Sandal feat. Eypio | Solo | Clean Bandit feat. Demi Lovato |
| 28 September | Reset | Mustafa Sandal feat. Eypio | Solo | Clean Bandit feat. Demi Lovato |
| 5 October | Vuracak | Merve Özbey | Solo | Clean Bandit feat. Demi Lovato |
| 12 October | Vuracak | Merve Özbey | Solo | Clean Bandit feat. Demi Lovato |
| 19 October | Yine Sev Yine | Tuğba Yurt | Solo | Clean Bandit feat. Demi Lovato |
| 26 October | Vuracak | Merve Özbey | Solo | Clean Bandit feat. Demi Lovato |
| 2 November | Sürgün Aşkımız | Emrah Karaduman feat. Derya Uluğ | In My Mind | Dynoro and Gigi D'Agostino |
| 9 November | Sürgün Aşkımız | Emrah Karaduman feat. Derya Uluğ | In My Mind | Dynoro and Gigi D'Agostino |
| 16 November | Sürgün Aşkımız | Emrah Karaduman feat. Derya Uluğ | In My Mind | Dynoro and Gigi D'Agostino |
| 23 November | Sürgün Aşkımız | Emrah Karaduman feat. Derya Uluğ | In My Mind | Dynoro and Gigi D'Agostino |
| 30 November | Seni Seve Seve | Emrah Kaya | Say My Name | David Guetta, Bebe Rexha and J Balvin |
| 7 December | Sürgün Aşkımız | Emrah Karaduman feat. Derya Uluğ | Say My Name | David Guetta, Bebe Rexha and J Balvin |
| 14 December | Aşk Bitsin | Buray | Say My Name | David Guetta, Bebe Rexha and J Balvin |
| 21 December | Seni Sever miydim | Hande Ünsal | Taki Taki | DJ Snake feat. Selena Gomez, Ozuna and Cardi B |
| 28 December | Öpücem | Simge | Taki Taki | DJ Snake feat. Selena Gomez, Ozuna and Cardi B |
