= List of number-one songs of 2022 (Turkey) =

This is the complete list of number-one singles in Turkey in 2022 according to Radiomonitor. The list on the left side of the box (Resmi Liste, "the Official List") represents physical and digital track sales as well as music streaming of the Turkish artists, and the one on the right side (Uluslararası Liste, "the International List") is the same thing for non-Turkish artists.

== Chart history ==
Date	Song (Official)	Artist (Official)	Song (International)	Artist (International)
3 January	Arıyorum	Edis	Do It to It (Note: In terms of number of the listeners); Love Nwantiti (Note: In terms of number of views)	Acraze feat. Cherish; CKay feat. Joeboy and Kuami Eugene
7 January	Arıyorum	Edis	Do It to It; Love Nwantiti	Acraze feat. Cherish; CKay feat. Joeboy and Kuami Eugene
14 January	Arıyorum	Edis	Do It to It	Acraze feat. Cherish
21 January	Arıyorum	Edis	Do It to It	Acraze feat. Cherish
28 January	Arıyorum	Edis	Do It to It	Acraze feat. Cherish
4 February	Arıyorum	Edis	Enemy; Do It to It	Imagine Dragons and JID; Acraze feat. Cherish
11 February	Bu Saatten Sonra	İkilem	Enemy; Bella ciao	Imagine Dragons and JID; Becky G
18 February	Bu Saatten Sonra	İkilem	Enemy; Do It to It	Imagine Dragons and JID; Acraze feat. Cherish
25 February	Bu Saatten Sonra	İkilem	Enemy; Up	Imagine Dragons and JID; Inna
