= Derya Uluğ =

Turkish singer (born 1986)

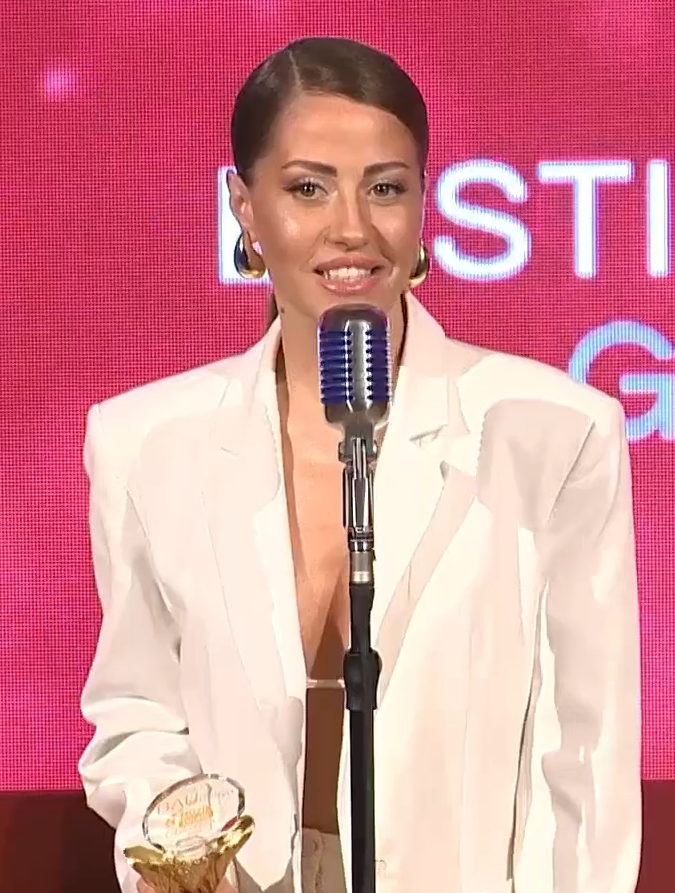
- Uluğ in 2024
- Born: 21 February 1986 (age 40); İzmir, Turkey
- Education: Muğla University; Haliç University
- Occupation: Singer
- Musical career
- Genre: Pop
- Years active: 2016–present
- Labels: DMC, Noya
- Website: www.deryaulug.com

Derya Uluğ (born 21 February 1986) is a Turkish singer.

== Early life and education ==
Uluğ was born in İzmir in 1986 as one of four siblings and was raised there. She is of Bulgarian Turkish and Albanian origin. From her childhood, she was interested in music and at the age of 8 took part in a music competition. She studied music and violin at the Muğla University and later graduated from Haliç University Conservatory.

== Career ==
She worked as Ebru Gündeş's backing vocalist for 3 years, until she decided to start her own music career. She released her first single "Okyanus" (Ocean) in 2016. The song was written by herself and Asil Gök, and composed by Burak Yeter. On 13 November 2016, Uluğ won the "Best Newcomer Soloist" award at the 43rd Golden Butterfly Awards.

== Discography ==
=== Studio albums ===
- Nefes (2023)

=== Singles ===
List of singles as lead artist, with selected chart positions, showing year released and album name
Title	Year	Peak chart positions	Album
Title	Year	TUR Dom. Air.	Album
"Okyanus"	2016	—	Non-album singles
"Canavar"	2017	—	Non-album singles
"Nabız 180"	2017	—	Non-album singles
"Ne münasebet"	2018	—	Non-album singles
"Kafalar karışık" (with Ece Seçkin)	2018	—	Non-album singles
"Ah zaman"	2019	—	Non-album singles
"Göremedim bi de sen bak"	2019	—	Non-album singles
"Kanunlar gibi"	2021	1	Non-album singles
"Bizim çocuklar" (with Mustafa Sandal, Eypio and Irmak Arıcı)	2021	—	Non-album singles
"Sana çıkıyor yollar"	2021	—	Non-album singles
"Canım dediklerim"	2022	—	Saygı Albümü: Bergen
"Hadi çal"	2022	—	Non-album singles
"Esmerin adı oya (Sarışınlar çat)"	2023	—	Non-album singles
"Nefes"	2023	2	Nefes
"Yansıma" (with Asil Gök)	2023	4	Nefes
"Yabani"	2024	5	Şehrazat bir ömrün hikayesi
"Hani"	2026	3	Non-album singles
"Şımarık"	2026	1	Non-album singles
"—" denotes a recording that did not chart or was not released in that territory. "*" denotes the chart did not exist at that time.

As featured artist

- "Sen Maşallah" (with Güven Yüreyi) (2017)
- "Ayrılığın Yükü Ağır" (from the album Yıldız Tilbe'nin Yıldızlı Şarkıları) (2018)
- "Sürgün Aşkımız" (with Emrah Karaduman) (2018)
- "Leyla & Mecnun" (with Cem Belevi) (2020)
- "Yazık" (with Ceylan Ertem) (from the album Duyuyor Musun?) (2022)
