= Yurtseven Kardeşler =

German Turkish band

- Origin: Germany of Turkish descent
- Genre: Pop
- Years active: 1985–2007; 2020
- Members: Hüseyin Yurtseven; Hasan Yurtseven; Mustafa Yurtseven; Zeynep Yurtseven; İsmail Yurtseven (İsmail YK)
- Website: www.yurtseven-kardesler.com

Yurtseven Kardeşler (literally "the Yurtseven Siblings" in Turkish), or YK for short, was a band working in Germany where they used to reside. Between 1985 and 1987, they released two amateur albums and gained some attention. Their break came with an appearance in 1988 on German TV channel ZDF's "Nachbarn in Europa" programme.

Yurtseven Kardeşler's relatively successful albums included: Bir Tek Sen / Barış Olsun in 1996, Toprak in 2000 (both on the Akbaş Müzik label) and De Bana / Of Anam Of in 2001, published jointly on Akbaş Müzik/Türküola.

In 2004, after searching for bigger labels, the Avrupa Müzik offered them a contract and the album Şimdi Halay Zamanı in 2004 and Seni Hiç Aşık Oldun Mu? in 2007 were released finding huge success in Turkey.

In addition, a member of the Yurtseven Kardeşler, namely İsmail YK has a successful solo career.

== Members ==
The members of Yurtseven Kardeşler were:

- Hüseyin Yurtseven, born 15 July 1961
- Hasan Yurtseven, born 2 May 1965
- Mustafa Yurtseven, born 28 November 1966
- Zeynep Yurtseven, born 14 January 1969
- İsmail Yurtseven, born 5 July 1978 (aka İsmail YK)

== Discography ==
=== Albums / Tracks ===
Dom Dom (1985)

1. Dom Dom Kurşunu
2. Oturur Derdini
3. Karadeniz
4. Emine
5. Hüdayda(Enstrümental)
6. Dağlar Seni Delik Deşik
7. Maşallah
8. Yalan Dünya
9. Liebe Gaby
10. Darıldım Darıldım

Son Yolcumsun (1987)

1. Atalım Mı Kızlar
2. Toprak
3. Hem O Yandan Hem Bu Yandan
4. Son Yolcumsun
5. Kaymakamın Kizları
6. Mevlam Sabır Versin
7. Canim Sıkıldı
8. Vuruldum
9. Sensiz Dunyam Neye Yarar
10. Ruyam Benim
11. Sev Take My Heart
12. Samsun'un Evleri
13. Yar Yar Yar Aman

Bir Tek Sen-Barış Olsun (1996)

1. Barış Olsun
2. Gitme Turnam Vuracaklar
3. Leylim Leyli
4. Sevgilim
5. Ah Le Aney
6. Yalansın Dünya
7. Züleyha
8. Halay (Enstrümantal)
9. Gel Oyna
10. Seninle
11. Güzel Yarim
12. Görmek İsterim
13. Hey Sen de Gel (Dance)
14. Hazır mısınız? (Techno)
15. Bir Tek Sen (Dance)
16. Misket (Instrumental)

Toprak (1998)

1. Hop De Bakim
2. Cin misin Peri misin ?
3. Ağlarım
4. Cankız
5. Canın Çıksın
6. Toprak
7. Halayımız Bitmesin
8. Kalmadı
9. Hoşuma Gittin
10. Kıskanır
11. Sev Sev
12. Kaçır Beni
13. Çek Git
14. Hüdayda (Instrumental)

Of Anam Of (2001)

1. De Bana
2. Yalanmış
3. Hayatımı Mahvettin
4. Tek Tek Saydım
5. Uzun İnce Bir Yoldayım
6. Dostluk Halayı
7. Selam Karadeniz'e
8. Elveda
9. Of Anam Of
10. Gitme Canım
11. Veremem Seni
12. Ali Baba'nın Çiftliği
13. Özledim
14. Zühtü
15. Elveda (Instrumental)

Şimdi Halay Zamanı (2005)

1. Sevdalıyım (Kız Ben Senin Canına)
2. Amanım
3. Kaymakam'ın Kızları
4. Şimdi Halay Zamanı
5. Kırmızı Kurdele
6. Makaram Sarı Bağlar
7. Çöz de Al
8. YK Halayı
9. Deliloy
10. Zühtü (New Version)

Sen Hiç Aşık Oldun mu? (2007)

1. Kanka (Sen Hiç Aşık Oldun mu?)
2. Lokum Gibi
3. Ölmek Vardır Dönmek Yoktur
4. Dilini mi Yuttun?
5. Elimde Değil
6. Olmaz Deme
7. Pişmanım
8. Boşver Salla
9. Yandı Ha Yandı
10. Şak Şak Ellere
11. Umurumda Değil
12. Kaçma Yar
13. Vay Gözünü Sevdiğimin Dünyası
14. Albüm Özetleri

Sevmeseydin (2020)

1. Sevmeseydin
