= Yusuf Güney =

Turkish singer

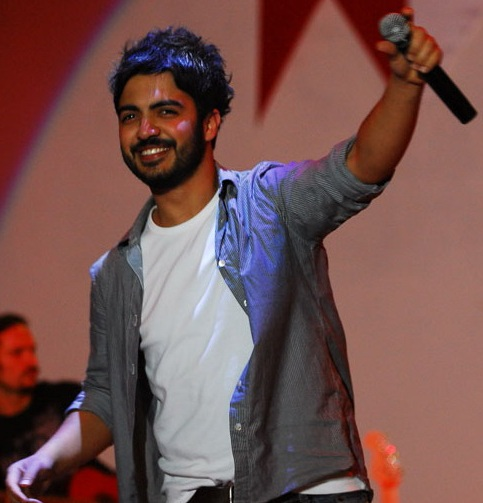

Background information
- Origin: Trabzon, Turkey
- Genres: Pop
- Occupations: Singer, songwriter, musician
- Instrument: Vocals
- Years active: 2008–present
- Website: yusufguney.com

Yusuf Güney is a Turkish singer who currently lives in London. Together with Rafet El Roman, their song Aşk-ı Virane was the number one single for 16 weeks in the Turkish charts in 2008 and thus the most successful song of the year.

== Life and career ==
He initially worked as a songwriter and in 2008 his song "Aşk-ı Virane" was included in Rafet El Roman's album Bir Roman Gibi and he was featured on it as well. The two later shot a music video for the song and it became a successful hit, ranking number-one on Türkçe Top 20 for 17 weeks. In 2009, the song was chosen as "Song of the Year" at the Turkey Music Awards.

Following this success, Güney released his first album Bir Sevda Masalı which was produced by Rafet El Roman and released on 12 February 2009 under the label Emre Plak. The first music video for this album, was made for the song "Heder Oldum Aşkına" written by Rafet El Roman. The song ranked second on Turkey's official music charts, and 99th on Europe Radio List. In May, another music video was recorded for the song "Aşkım Aşklarından Bulasın", which was written by himself. It ranked number 6 on Turkey's charts. Güney's second album Aşka İnat, which included 10 songs, was released on 3 May 2010 by Emre Plak.

== Discography ==
=== Albums ===
- Bir Sevda Masalı (2009)
- Aşka İnat (2010)
- Sevgi Arsızı (2013)
- Kaptan (2016)

=== EPs ===
- Kader Rüzgarı (2012)

=== Singles ===
- "Bunalım" (2013)
- "Hazin" (2014)
- "Kördüğüm" (2016)
- "Yaradanım" (2018)
- "Çak Bi Beşlik" (2019)
- "Duydun Mu?" (2020)
- "Zamansız Yağmur" (Musa Eroğlu ile Bir Asır 2) (2022)
- "Boş Kafalar" (2022)

=== Duets ===
- "Aşk-ı Virane" (with Rafet El Roman)
- "Aşka İnat" (with Rafet El Roman and Eren Atsoy)
- "Değilsin" (with Şeyma Erdoğan)
- "Kendine İyi Bak" (with Semra San)

== Charts ==
Album	Single	Peak
Album	Single	Turkey
"Bir Roman Gibi"	"Aşk-ı Virane" (feat. Rafet El Roman)	1
"Bir Sevda Masalı"	"Heder Oldum Aşkına"	1
"Bir Sevda Masalı"	"Aşkım Aşklarından Bulasın"	6
"Bir Sevda Masalı"	"Git Bedenim Buralardan"	2

Album	Single	Peak
Album	Single	Turkey
"Aşka İnat"	"Aşka İnat"	4
"Aşka İnat"	"Serserin Oldum"	9
