= İsmail YK =

Turkish German singer

- Born: İsmail Yurtseven; 5 July 1978 (age 48); Hamm, West Germany
- Origin: Sivas, Turkey
- Genres: folk; parody; halay; anadolu rock; folk rock; folk-pop; pop; acoustic; turkish rap; reggae
- Occupations: musician; lyricist; songwriter; supervisor; arranger; composer; television presenter; actor; engineer
- Instruments: folk guitar; zurna; kaval; balaban; clarinet; davul; bağlama; violin; bass guitar; cura; qanun
- Years active: 1985–present
- Label: Avrupa Müzik (2004–2008) Musicom (2009–present)
- Website: www.ismailyk.com

İsmail YK (born İsmail Yurtseven, 5 July 1978) is a Turkish German pop singer of Kurdish origin. YK stands for Yurtseven Kardeşler, the siblings group he was a member of at the start of his career. A number of his albums have been top sellers in Turkey.

His first solo album Şappur Şuppur sold 1.2 million copies. In 2006 his second album Bombabomba.com was the best selling Turkish album with over 600,000 copies. In 2008, his third album Bas Gaza sold 450,000 copies. İsmail YK has won many awards including Best Turkish singer that he won 3 times consecutively in 2006, 2007 and 2008. İsmail YK, who accelerated his works after a long break, released his album Kıyamet on Valentine's Day 2015. The album consisted of 12 songs, including the song "Yaralıyım" from the album Haydi Bastır which was rerecorded with Hatice. The song "Çıkmam Seneye" which he had written at the age of 12 was included in the album as well.

İsmail YK rerecorded the rock version of the song "Allah Belanı Versin" (2006) and released a music video for it. In its 2006 music video he used an Alfa Romeo 164 while for the new music video he used a Ferrari F430 car. The songs and its music video were among the most discussed subjects on music news in Turkey within the first 3 days of its release. As to why he damaged the car in the music video he said that "he wanted to send this message that instead of hurting someone it's better to cause damage to materialistic things".

== Discography ==
=== Albums ===
- 2002: Albüm Solo
- 2004: Şappur Şuppur
- 2006: Bombabomba.com
- 2008: Bas Gaza
- 2009: Haydi Bastır
- 2011: Psikopat
- 2012: Metropol
- 2015: Kıyamet
- 2018: Tansiyon

=== Singles ===
- "Doğum Günün Haram Olsun" (2014)
- "Ah Leylim" (2015)
- "Allah Belanı Versin (Rock Versiyon)" (2016)
- "Hep Seninle Olmak" (2019)
- "Çikolatam" (2019)
- "Yala Dur" (2019)
- "Oha" (2020)
- "Yaktırdın Bir Sigara" (2020)
- "Ayvayı Yemiş" (2020)
- "Hadi Ya" (2021)
- "Ayrilmama" 2021
- "Dokuz Mevsim" (2021)
- "Aşkına Memnu" (2021)
- "Tatlı Kız" (2021)
- "Ağlarsan Ağla" (2021)
- "Cehennem" (2022)
- "Dondurmalar" Benden (2022)
- "Dertli Dertli" (2022)
- "Bana Neden Kiyidin" (2022)
- "Daglar Seni Delik Delik Delerim (2022)
- "Simarik" (2022)
- "Agiz Olan Konusuyor (2022)
- "Sen Gidemezsin" (2023)
- "Hey Siri" (2023)
- "Arama Artik" (2023)
- "Sen Herkesten Tatlisin" (2023)
- "Azma" (2024)
- "Için Yaniyor" (2024)

== Filmography ==
- Selena (2006) Guest appearance
- Korkusuzlar (2007) İsmail
- Oyun Başladı (2009) Kanka
