= Buray =

Turkish Cypriot pop singer

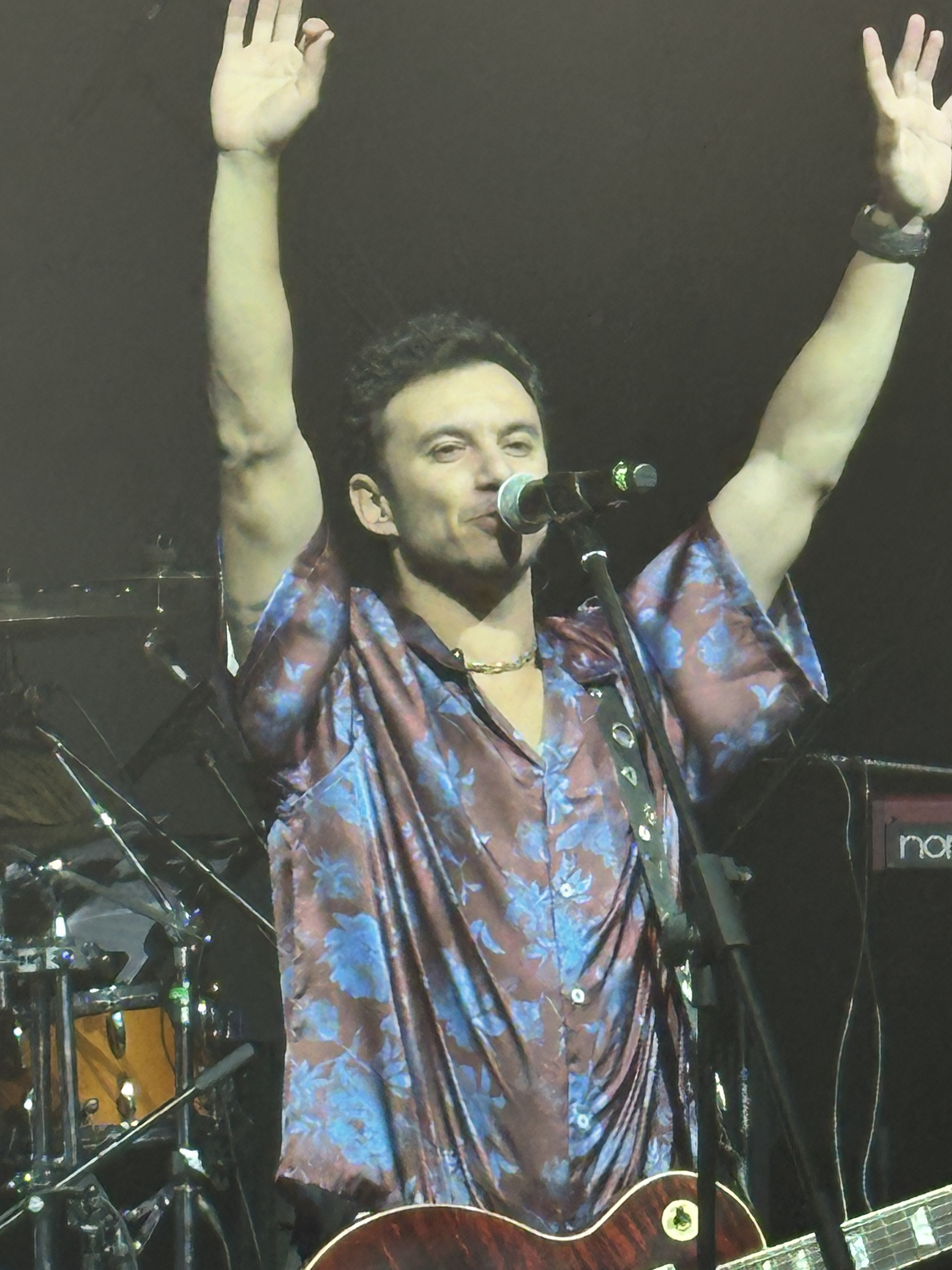
- Buray in 2024

Background information
- Birth name: Buray Hoşsöz
- Born: 15 June 1984 (age 41); Nicosia, Cyprus
- Genres: Turkish pop
- Occupation: Singer
- Instrument: Guitar
- Years active: 2015–present
- Labels: Sony; Gomma; Wasp

Buray Hoşsöz (born 15 June 1984) is a Turkish Cypriot pop singer.

== Career ==
The lead single for Buray's debut album 1 Şişe Aşk was "İstersen." The lyrics were written by Gözde Ançel, and it was composed and arranged by Buray himself. Over time, the song gained traction and saw increased airplay on radio and digital platforms. The song peaked at number one on the Türkçe Top 20. The second music video was released for the song "Sen Sevda Mısın" which also went on to top Turkey's official music charts. This was followed by the music video for the song "Kimsenin Suçu Yok".

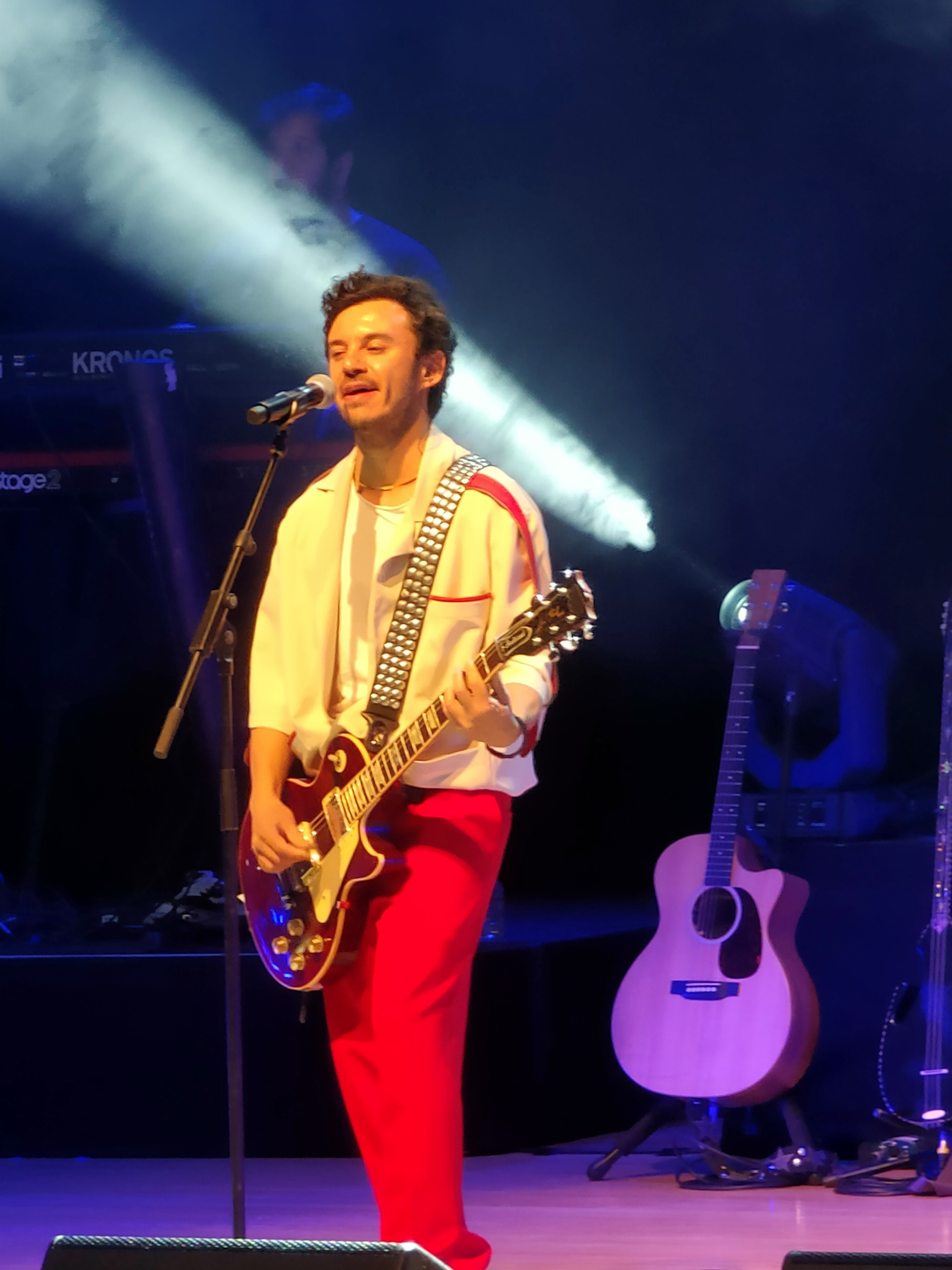
Buray in 2022

Later on Buray released two more albums: Sahiden in 2016 and Kehanet in 2018 with further hits including "Aşk mı Lazım", "Aşk Bitsin", "Deli Divane" and "Kabahat Bende".

== Discography ==
Throughout his career he has released four studio albums and two remix albums.

=== Albums ===
==== Studio albums ====
List of albums, sales chart and certifications
Album	Album info	Certifications	Sales
1 Şişe Aşk	Release date: 14 August 2015 (TR); Label: Sony Music; Format: CD, digital		
Sahiden	Release date: 11 November 2016 (TR); Label: Sony Music; Format: CD, digital		
Kehanet	Release date: 19 October 2018 (TR); Label: Sony Music; Format: CD, digital		
Başka Hikayeler	Release date: 26 February 2021 (TR); Label: Gomma & Wasp; Format: Digital		
Al Senin Olsun Dünya	Release date: 16 November 2023 (TR); Label: Gomma & Wasp; Format: Digital		

==== Remix albums ====
List of albums
Album	Album info	Certifications	Sales
İstersen Remixes	Release date: 30 October 2015 (TR); Label: Sony; Format: Digital		
Deli Kız Remixes	Release date: 18 September 2020 (TR); Label: Gomma; Format: Digital		
Summer Mix	Release date: 8 August 2025 (TR); Label: Sony; Format: Digital		

=== EPs ===
- Serseri Ruhum (2024)
- Home Session (2025)

=== Singles ===
- "Hayat Sürer" (2014)
- "Ben Ölmeden Önce" (with Emrah Karaduman) (2019)
- "Aşka Extra'nı Kat" (2019)
- "Rampapapam" (with Feride Hilal Akın & KÖK$VL) (2020)
- "Deli Kız" (2020)
- "Aşk Ne Güzel Şey" (with Erkin Arslan & Evrencan Gündüz) (2020)
- "Senin Yüzünden" (with Arem Özgüç & Arman Aydın) (2020)
- "Çift Gökkuşağı" (Ada Masalı Soundtrack) (2021)
- "1938" (with Erkin Arslan)
- "Deals with the Devil" (with Ilkay Sencan) (2022)
- "Aşk Yeniden" (Yeni Türkü Zamansız) (2022)
- "Kara Gözlüm" (with Emrah Karaduman) (2022)
- "Yangın Var" (with Arem Özgüç & Arman Aydın) (2022)
- "Girdap" (2022)
- "Here Comes the Dawn" (with Erk Emindayı) (2022)
- "Yok Mu?" (2022)
- "Self Control" (2023)
- "Beni Affet" (with Ceren Gündoğdu) (2023)
- "Olmuşum Leyla" (2023)
- "Yaz Yağmuru" (Serdar Ortaç Şarkıları Vol. 2) (2023)
- "Herkes Görsün" (Erkin Arslan ile) (2024)
- "İstanbul Bile" (Sena Şahin ile) (2025)
- "Buzlu Cam" (2025)

=== Music videos ===
List of music videos, release date and director(s)
Year	Video	Album	Director(s)
2015	"İstersen"	1 Şişe Aşk	İmre Haydaroğlu
2015	"Sen Sevda Mısın"	1 Şişe Aşk	Gülşen Aybaba
2016	"Kimsenin Suçu Yok"	1 Şişe Aşk	Hasan Kuyucu
2016	"Aşk mı Lazım"	Sahiden	İlayda Kular
2017	"Seni Sevmiyorum Artık"	Sahiden	Hasan Kuyucu
2017	"Mecnun"	Sahiden	Hasan Kuyucu
2017	"Sahiden"	Sahiden	Serdar Börcan
2018	"Deli Divane"	Sahiden	Serdar Börcan
2018	"Aşk Bitsin"	Kehanet	Serdar Börcan
2019	"Kabahat Bende"	Kehanet	Serdar Börcan
2019	"Aşka Extra'nı Kat"	Non-album single	Kıvanç Baruönü
2019	"Tac Mahal"	Kehanet	Olgaç Öke & Mehmet Kozal
2020	"Kış Bahçeleri"	Kehanet	Ömer Can Duman
2020	"Rampapapam"	Non-album single	Hasan Kuyucu
2020	"Deli Kız"	Non-album single	Çağtay Kubilay Güraras
2020	"Senin Yüzünden"	Non-album single	Omid Saghafi
2021	"Yüreksiz Tilki"	Başka Hikayeler	Mali Ergin
2021	"Alaz Alaz"	Başka Hikayeler	Ahmet Can Tekin
2021	"Nasıl Unuturum"	Başka Hikayeler	Melih Kun
2022	"Deals with the Devil"	Non-album single	Cem Kılıç
2022	"Yangın Var"	Non-album single	Serdar Börcan
2022	"Girdap"	Non-album single	Hasan Kuyucu
2022	"Yok mu?"	Non-album single	Ece Naz Kızıltan
2024	"İnci"	Al Senin Olsun Dünya	Ömer Berkli
2024	"Al Senin Olsun Dünya"	Al Senin Olsun Dünya	Utku Baş
2024	"Bedduam Yok"	Serseri Ruhum	Ahmet Can Tekin
2024	"Kalbime Kalbime"	Serseri Ruhum	Ahmet Can Tekin
2024	"Ne Oldu Bize"	Al Senin Olsun Dünya	Coşkun Turgut
2025	"Buzlu Cam"	Non-album single	Hasan Kuyucu

=== Charts ===
List of singles, release date and album name
Single	Year	Peak	Album
Single	Year	TR	Album
"İstersen"	2015	1	1 Şişe Aşk
"Sen Sevda Mısın"	2015	1	1 Şişe Aşk
"Kimsenin Suçu Yok"	2016	—	1 Şişe Aşk
"Aşk mı Lazım"	2017	2	Sahiden
"Aşk Bitsin"	2018	1	Kehanet
"Kabahat Bende"	2019	3	Kehanet
"Deli Kız"	2020	2	Non-album single
"—" indicates that the songs were not included in the lists or the results were not disclosed.
