= Yaşar Kurt =

Arşak Yaşar Kurt
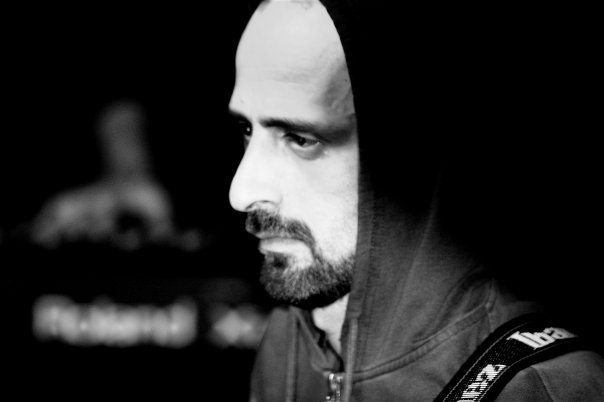

Background information
- Born: 16 August 1968 (age 57)
- Origin: Istanbul, Turkey
- Genres: Rock
- Occupation: singer-songwriter
- Website: www.yasarkurt.com

Arşak Yaşar Kurt (Armenian: Արշակ Եաշար Քուրթ, born 16 August 1968) is a Turkish-Armenian rock artist.

== Biography ==
He studied in 1990 at the Faculty of Open Education Anadolu University but did not graduate.

He founded the alternative musical group Beyaz Yunus (literally White Dolphin). In 1993, he had his first studio recording in Germany and in 1994, released the album Sokak Şarkıları (literally Street Songs) recorded in Cologne, Germany. The album on the Ada Müzik music label became very popular in Turkey. A series of concerts followed throughout Turkey. Moving to Berlin, a daughter was born named Rosa. He returned in 1996 to Turkey to continue with his musical career.

Göndermeler (literally Referrals) was released in 1997 album on Aks Müzik and Boğaziçi Müzik labels. After one-and-a-half years, he released Reflex produced by Ağdaş Müzik containing 9 songs stretching in the period 1990–2000 as well as 3 cover versions.

In 2003, he released a collection album entitled Anne under his own music label. In 2003 he was one of the founders of Barışarock, a major rock event in Turkey. In 2004, he wrote the music for Atv television's popular series "Sevda Tepesi".

Upon discovering his Armenian roots, he had himself baptized as an Armenian Apostolic Christian and accepted a new Armenian name as Arşak. and in 2007 he and Armenian-Turkish artist Arto Tunçboyacıyan formed Yash-ar (made up of part of his and Arto's first names).

In 2011, Kurt released the album Güneş Kokusu (literally Smell of Sun) including a hit song called Ver Bana Düşlerimi (literally Give Me My Dreams) on YouTube.

== Discography ==
=== Albums ===
- 1994: Sokak Şarkıları
- 1997: Göndermeler
- 2002: Reflex
- 2003: Anne
- 2007: Nefrete Kine Karşı (credited to Yaş-Ar, a duo with Arto Tunçboyacıyan)
- 2011: Güneş Kokusu

=== Soundtrack ===
- 2004: Sevda Tepesi
