= Gökhan Türkmen =

Turkish singer (born 1983)

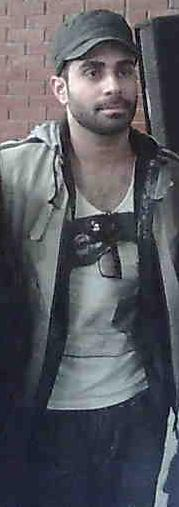

Background information
- Born: 1 September 1983 (age 42); Istanbul, Turkey
- Genres: Pop · funk rock
- Occupation: Singer
- Instrument: Guitar
- Years active: 2008–present
- Website: GökhanTürkmen.com.tr

Gökhan Türkmen (born 1 September 1983) is a Turkish singer.

== Life and career ==
Türkmen was born in 1983 in Istanbul. He started learning guitar in 1997. He is a graduate of Habire Yahşi High School. In 2000, he started his career by playing guitar and singing at various places. In 2003, he graduated from Kocaeli University with a degree in industrial management. After receiving singing lessons for a year, he worked on some radio stations as a singer. His breakthrough came with the song "Büyük İnsan", which was written and composed by Serkan Söylemez. A year later, he released the single "Dön", followed by the song "Efkarlıyım", also written by Serkan Söylemez. In 2008, his debut studio album Büyük İnsan was released by İrem Records and separate music videos were released for the songs "Yan Sen", "Büyük İnsan" and "Dön".

In March 2010, he released his second studio album Biraz Ayrılık. The album was well-received by fans and critics and Türkmen's songs became among the most streamed works on radio and television. The songs "Rüya", "Biraz Ayrılık", "Ayıp Ettin" and "Bir Öykü" were turned into music videos.

Türkmen released his first EP Ara in 2012. His third studio album En Baştan was released in February 2014. The album contains 13 songs in total, with one of them being a cover. A music video for the album's lead single, "Çatı Katı, was released on YouTube in February 2014. Other songs from this album that were turned into music videos were "Sırasıyla Dene", "Sen İstanbulsun", and "Taş".

In 2015, the Sesi Çok Güzel music contest on FOX as a judge alongside Sibel Can and Sertab Erener.

== Discography ==
Studio albums

- Büyük İnsan (2008)
- Biraz Ayrılık (2010)
- En Baştan (2014)
- Sessiz (2016)
- Romantik (2020)
- 7 (2021)

Live albums

- Akustik + (2021)

EPs

- Ara (2012)
- Synesthesia (2018)
- Virgül (2019)
- Gökhan Türkmen'le Az Biraz (2019)

Singles

- "Val Halimize" (feat. GT BAND) (2016)
- "Lafügüzaf" (2018)
- "Para Hala Bende" (feat. Aytaç Özgümüş) (2019)
- "Aşkın Enkazı" (2019)
- "Sır" (2019)
- "Gülmedi Kader" (with Birkan Nasuhoğlu) (2020)
- "Kağıt" (2020)
- "Bout D'Histoire" (2020)
- "Aşk" (2020)
- "Yüzüme Vurma" (with Serkan Emre Çiftçi) (2020)
- "Deli" (2020)
- "Mavi" (feat. Nil Rona) (2020)
- "Gelin Canlar" (feat. Burcu Arı) (2021)
- "Mahşer" (2022)
- "Herkes Yolunda" (with Mert Carim) (2022)
- "Kadınım" (with Ceylan Ertem) (from the album Duyuyor Musun?) (2022)
- "Seninle Ben" (2022)
- "Döne Döne (Live)" (with Şanışer) (2022)
- "Bilmem" (2022)
- "Durumlar Müsait" (with Deeperise) (2023)
- "Kendini Bozmadan" (with Harmanadam) (2023)
- "Elif" (with Serkan Emre Çiftçi) (2023)
- "Ah Yandım" (2023)
- "Sevme" (from the album Hürmet) (2023)
- "Kalem" (2023)

== Awards ==
Year	Award	Category
2010	37th Golden Butterfly Awards	Best Debut by a Soloist
2013	Düzce University 1st Media Awards	Best Song (Bitmesin)
2013	Ege University 2nd Media Awards	Best Song (Bitmesin)
2013	1st Turkey Music Awards	Most Streamed Song on Radios (Bitmesin)
2013	MGD 19th Golden Objective Awards	Best Male Singer
2014	11th Radio Boğaziçi Music Awards	Best Male Pop Music Artist
2014	Istanbul Fm 20th Golden Awards	Best Album by a Male Artist (Bitmesin)
2015	Unimpeded Life Foundation Awards	Best Male Pop Music Artist of the Year
2015	13th YTÜ Stars of the Year Awards	Most Liked Male Singer
2015	Yeditepe University 3rd Dilek Awards	Best Male Singer of the Year
2015	Düzce University 3rd Media Awards	Best Male Artist
2015	Düzce University 3rd Media Awards	Best Album (En Baştan)
2015	1st Turkey Youth Awards	Best Male Artist
