= Yalın =

Turkish pop singer and songwriter (born 1980)

- Born: Hüseyin Yalın; 30 March 1980 (age 46); Istanbul, Turkey
- Genres: Pop; world; rock
- Occupations: Singer-songwriter; composer; musician
- Instruments: Vocals; guitar
- Years active: 2004–present
- Labels: Universal; Pasaj; Avrupa; Seyhan; DMC
- Website: yalinonline.com

Hüseyin Yalın (born 30 March 1980), better known by his surname Yalın, is a Turkish pop singer and songwriter. He achieved success with the song "Zalim" in 2004.

== Early life ==
Hüseyin Yalın was born on 30 March 1980 in Nişantaşı, Istanbul, as the son of Figen and Kamil Yalın. He went to primary school at Ataköy, Bakırköy. He is the nephew of journalist Ferai Tınç.

== Music career ==
=== Career beginnings ===
Yalın soon started to write songs and eventually collaborated with Kargo's guitarist Selim Öztürk to produce an album. Selim Öztürk produced the album, while Kargo's other members Serkan Çeliköz and Burak Karataş served as keyboarder and drummer respectively. Yalın wrote all of the songs for his first album and Ellerine Sağlık was eventually released in March 2004 under the label Universal Music. The album's lead single "Zalim" became a hit in Turkey, and the album sold 200,000 copies in one week. Ebru Çapa of Hürriyet praised the song's composition and lyrics in her review for the newspaper. By the end of the month, it sold 300,000 copies. The number rose to 500,000 within four months of its release. As a result, it ranked number 4 on Universal Music's list of best-selling albums after Guns N' Roses. MÜ-YAP also recognized it as one of the "Best-selling albums of the year". The album was favorably received on digital platforms and broke a record at the time with 1 million and 700 thousands downloads. As a result, Yalın earned 2 million dollars with the success of his album on digital platforms. After releasing a music video for "Zalim", he subsequently recorded and released separate music videos for "Sonsuz Ol" and "Günaydın", the third of which ranked MTV World Chart Express program, and entered the musical charts of Bulgaria and Greek. At the Turkey Music Awards, Yalın was chosen as the "Best Male Newcomer" and his song "Zalim", was covered by the Albanian singer Rovena Stefa and Bulgarian singer Toni Storaro under the titles "Zemer" and "Greshnica" respectively. The song was translated to numerous languages including Greek, Russian, Serbian and Arabic. The song "Değmez" from his album, was rearranged by one of Universal Music's producers Martin Kierszenbaum to be used on Japanese singer Ai's album What's Goin' On Ai. In 2006, Yalın collaborated with Ai and American reggae artist Shaggy on Ai's album What's Goin' On Ai with the track "Famous feat. Shaggy and Yalın".

The judges on NTV's musical program chose Ellerine Sağlık as the tenth best album of the past decade in Turkey.

After the success of the album, Yalın went on a tour and gave concerts in Cemil Topuzlu Open-Air Theatre and Rumelihisarı in Istanbul, followed by about 40 performances across Turkey and Europe.

=== Subsequent career ===
While being on tour after the success of Ellerine Sağlık, in December 2004 Yalın started working on his second studio album. Due to Universal Music's closure in Turkey the promotions for his first album stopped, and to be able to continue with his second album's preparations, he signed a contract with Pasaj Müzik. The first song from the album to get a music video was "Küçücüğüm" followed by "Bir Bakmışsın" and "Ben Bilmem". The fourth music video was made for "Keşke" which in Yalın's words was "The best song I've ever made." The album's lead single "Küçücüğüm" was awarded as the "Best Song of the Year" by POPSAV. A remix of "Küçücüğüm" by Volga Tamöz was later released in September 2005. Bir Bakmışsın became one of the best-selling albums of 2006, and MÜ-YAP gave the album a gold certification.

Yalın's third studio album Her Şey Sensin was released under the label Avrupa Müzik in March 2007. All of the songs were written by Yalın himself and he worked with Egyptian percussionist Hossam Ramzy, American guitarist Tim Pierce, who has been on the albums of many artists (including Michael Jackson, Bon Jovi, Eric Clapton, Shakira, Christina Aguilera), and American bass player Matt Bissonette, who had previously worked with Ringo Starr. Within 20 days of its release, the album sold 110,000 copies. As one of the "Best-selling albums of the year" it received a gold certificate from MÜ-YAP. Cemil Ağacıkoğlu directed the music video for "Her Şey Sensin". Subsequently, two other music videos were released for the songs "Cumhuriyet" and "Kalamadım". "Cumhuriyet" was also well received by fans and critics.

After a short break, in 2009 he release his new album Ben Bugün. All of the songs were written by Yalın and arranged by Alper Erinç. The photographs for the album were shot by Mehmet Turgut. Yalın's total album sales at the time was 1 million, earning him a total of 6 million dollars.

Yalın who had released four albums over the course of 5 years, waited until June 2012 to release his new single "Anlat Güzel Mi Oralar". The song was written by Yalın, and produced by Avrupa Müzik, and Ozan Çolakoğlu served as the arranger.

== Other works ==
Yalın has also been involved in a series of commercials for Vestel. Yalın played the role of a famous figure who embellished the dreams of a little girl, played by 9-year-old Alara Bağcı. In this series of Vestel's commercials with the theme of "friendly technology", the brand's mascot Vestrons also made an appearance.

In May 2013, Azeri singer Elçin Ceferov released the music video for his song "Bana onu çağırın gelsin" which was inspired by Yalın's music video "Ah Be Kardeşim".

== Discography ==
Albums

- Ellerine Sağlık (2004)
- Bir Bakmışsın (2005)
- Herşey Sensin (2007)
- Ben Bugün (2009)
- Sen En Güzelsin (2012)
- Bayıla Bayıla (2016)

Singles

- "Anlat Güzel Mi Oralar?" (2011)
- "Keyfi Yolunda Aşkı Sonunda" (2013)
- "Aşk Diye" (2014)
- "Bir Bahar Akşamı" (2015)
- "King for One Day" (2015)
- "Yeniden" (2015)
- "Benimki" (2015)
- "Hele Bi Başla" (2018)
- "Sensiz Ben Ne Olayım" (2018)
- "Deva Bize Sevişler" (2019)
- "Deme Bana Yokum" (2019)
- "İstanbul" (2019)
- "Ya Sabır" (2020)
- "Halbuki" (2020)
- "Oyunbaz" (2020)
- "Ver O Zaman Gömleklerimi" (2021)
- "Yaz Gülü" (2021)
- "Bu da Geçer mi Sevgilim" (2022)
- "O Yaz Bu Yaz" (2022)
