= Rafet El Roman =

Turkish pop singer (born 1968)

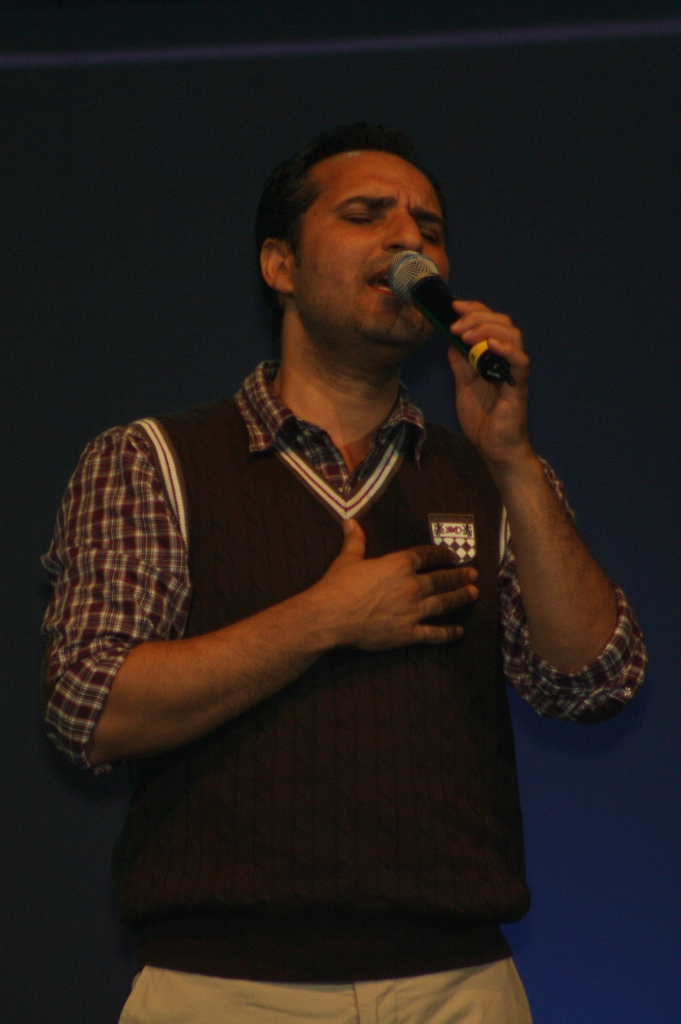
- Rafet El Roman in 2010

Background information
- Born: Rafet Yaşdut; 25 August 1968 (age 57); Uzunköprü, Edirne, Turkey
- Genres: Pop
- Occupations: Singer, songwriter, musician
- Instruments: Vocals, guitar
- Years active: 1992–present

Rafet Yaşdut (born 25 August 1968), better known by his stage name Rafet El Roman, is a Turkish pop singer. He holds German citizenship.

== Biography ==
When El Roman's parents moved to Germany in 1970, he lived with his grandmother until he was 7 years old at Uzunköprü. After he finished first grade at primary school in the village, he was sent to his parents to Germany. He completed his education in Germany. He speaks German, English, Italian and Turkish. He started writing his first lyrics at 16 years old.

In 1984 he contacted Stefan Somogyfoki from Midnight Entertainment and in 1987 he played the leading role in the fantasy movie Defender. At this time he learned a lot about film making and acting. Also, he started to co-direct his own fighting scenes in movies. Everyone could see his talent for acting and the art of making movies. At this time he started to write his first songs "Benimlen" and "Seni Seviyorum".

He gave his first stage performances in 1988. In 1992, he was voted "Best of the Year" by Saarlaendischer Rundfunk Radio. In 1994, he was awarded with Media Artist Award in Frankfurt Cultural Festival. In August 1995, he returned to Turkey and released his first solo album. The album Gençliğin Gözyaşı (The Tears of the Youth) sold over one million having hits like "Sorma Neden", "Seni Seviyorum" and "Amerika". In October 1997, he released his second album En Güzel Günler Senin Olsun (Have The Most Beautiful Days). In 1998, he released his first solo album in Europe. In 1998, he played in the film Propaganda with major stars of the Turkish cinema history such as Kemal Sunal and Metin Akpınar.

In May 1999, he had a huge success with his third album Hayat Hüzünlü (Sorrowful Life). In 2000, Rafet El Roman vocalized the song Bir Gol Daha (One More Goal) with Mehmet Ali Erbil for the Turkey national football team's Euro 2000 campaign. In 2000, he was the principal actor in the cinema film Offside (Dar Alanda Kısa Paslaşmalar) with co-star Müjde Ar. In 2001, with his own lyrics and song, he sang a duet with Aşkın Nur Yengi titled "Peşindeyim" (I Am in the Pursue of You).

He released the fourth album Hanimeli (Lonicera) in January 2001 and his fifth album 5 Nr. Aşk (Love Nr. 5) in April 2002. He released his 6th album, Sürgün (Exile), in the summer of 2004 and this album sold the best. The album had been one of the favorite albums of 2004 with many hit songs. In summer 2005, he released the seventh album Kalbimin Sultanı (The Sultan of My Heart) in honour of his 10th Year. The album became the top seller after initial release. He received the MÜ-YAP "Golden Butterfly", POPSAV "The Most Successful Pop Singer of the Year" awards. In summer 2006, he released the album Gönül Yarası (Heart Pain).

== Personal life ==
He has two daughters with former wife, beauty contest winner Tuğba Altıntop. The couple divorced in 2003. They received wide interest in the media with the custody battle over their daughters. He also has a son with his former partner Yeşim Eryıldız. In 2014, he married his second wife Ceren Kaplakarslan in Germany. The two got divorced in August 2017.

== Discography ==
=== Albums ===
Year	Title	Sales
1995	Gençliğin Gözyaşı (Tears of the Youth)	800,000
1997	En Güzel Günler Senin Olsun (The Best Day Shall Be Yours)	
1999	Hayat Hüzünlü (Life is Tragic)	
2001	Hanım Eli (a Flower)	
2002	Aşk Nr. 5 (Love Nr.5)	35.000 in 2004
2004	Sürgün (Immigrant)	473,000
2005	Kalbimin Sultanı (The Sultan of my Heart)	330,000
2006	Gönül Yarasi (Love Scar)	
2008	Bir Roman Gibi (Like A Novel)	
2011	Sevgiye Zaman Ver (You give time to love)	
2013	Yadigar (Memento)	
2016	Mecnun (Crazy/Peculiar Person)	
2021	Sırrına Eremeyiz (We Can't Reach Your Secret)	

=== Singles ===
- 2000 - Peşindeyim (feat. Aşkın Nur Yengi)
- 2012 - Senden Sonra
- 2014 - Adımla Seslendi
- 2015 - Şipşak
- 2016 - Suç Bende mi
- 2016 - Teşekkürler Türkiyem
- 2017 - Sen Olmazsan (feat. Hülya Avşar)
- 2018 - Özledim
- 2018 - Unuturum Elbet (feat. Derya)
- 2019 - Bağışla Beni (feat. Faridam)
- 2019 - Bahçede Yeşil Çınar (feat. Ayşe Nur Keskin)
- 2019 - Anlamazdın (Fikret Şeneş Şarkıları) (2019)
- 2019 - Seveni Suçlama
- 2020 - Paramparça (feat. Burak King)
- 2020 - Öldüğün Gün İnanırsın (Kitaplara İnanmayan)
- 2021 - İki Dakika (feat. Nur Usta)
- 2021 - Bağışla Beni
- 2021 - Şubat (feat. Ayten)
- 2022 - Milyon Yara

== Filmography ==
- 1999 – Propaganda (Adem) (1999)
- 2000 – Dar Alanda Kısa Paslaşmalar (Serkan) (2000)
- 2002 – Asayiş Berkemal (Berkemal) (2002)
- 2007 – Senin Uğruna (Kemal) (2007)
