= Mustafa Sandal discography =

- Studio albums: 9
- Extended plays: 4
- Compilation albums: 1
- Singles: 21

Turkish pop music artist Mustafa Sandal's discography consists of 9 studio albums, 1 compilation album, 4 EPs and 21 singles. To this day, his albums have been released by different labels including Şahin Özer Müzik, Prestij Müzik, Ascot Music, Atoll Music, Sony Music, Erol Köse Production, Universal Music, Seyhan Müzik, Poll Production and DMC. His albums have sold 13 million copies worldwide.

== Albums ==
=== Studio albums ===
Album	Album info	Certifications	Sales
Suç Bende	Released: 11 July 1994; Label: Şahin Özer Müzik; Format: Cassette, CD		1,700,000
Gölgede Aynı	Released: 12 June 1996; Label: Şahin Özer Müzik; Format: Cassette, CD		3,600,000
Detay	Released: 1 September 1998; Label: Prestij Müzik; Format: Cassette, CD		
Akışına Bırak	Released: 10 June 2000; Label: Prestij Müzik; Format: Cassette, CD, digital download		
Kop	Released: 31 May 2002; Label: Erol Köse Production; Format: Cassette, CD, digital download		
Seven	Released: 1 October 2003; Label: Universal Music-Polydor; Format: CD, cassette, digital download		
Devamı Var	Released: 13 June 2007; Label: Seyhan Müzik; Format: CD, cassette, digital download	MÜ-YAP: Gold	200,000
Karizma	Released: 8 July 2009; Label: Seyhan Müzik; Format: CD, digital download		55,000
Organik	Released: 11 June 2012; Label: Poll Production; Format: CD, digital download		46,000

=== Compilation album ===
Album	Album info	Certificates	Sales
Araba	Released: 11 January 2000; Label: Sony Music; Format: Cassette, CD, digital download		

=== EPs ===
Album	Album info	Certificates	Sales
Aya Benzer	Released: 1999; Label: Ascot Music; Format: Cassette, CD, digital download		
Maxi Sandal 2003 / Moonlight	Released: 25 June 2003; Label: Erol Köse Production; Format: Cassette, CD, digital download		
İste	Released: 13 July 2004; Label: Erol Köse Production; Format: CD, cassette, digital download	MÜ-YAP: Diamond	510,000
Yamalı Tövbeler	Released: 25 July 2005; Label: Erol Köse Production; Format: Cassette, CD, digital download		180,000

== Singles ==
Year	Title	Charts						Sales
Year	Title	TR	DE	CH	AT	FR	BE (Wa)	Sales
2000	Araba (Car)	—	—	—	—	—	—	
2003	Aya Benzer 2003 (feat. Gülcan) (Moonlight)	—	8	67	40	—	—	125,000
2004	Araba 2004 (Car 2004)	—	41	85	—	53	38	
2005	İsyankar (feat. Gentleman) (Rebellious)	—	6	4	11	—	—	150,000
2007	İndir (Degrade)	1	—	—	—	—	—	
2007	Melek Yüzlüm (My Angel Faced)	2	—	—	—	—	—	
2008	Gönlünü Gün Edeni (One Who Entertains the Heart)	7	—	—	—	—	—	
2008	Kimbilir Kim (Who Knows Who)	14	—	—	—	—	—	
2009	Ateş Et Ve Unut (Fire and Forget)	7	—	—	—	—	—	
2011	Şıkır Şıkır (duet with Gülben Ergen) (Shiny Shiny)	1	—	—	—	—	—	163,243
2013	2 Tas Çorba (2 Bowls of Soup)	—	—	—	—	—	—	
2013	Tesir Altında (Under Influence)	1	—	—	—	—	—	20,000
2015	Ben Olsaydım (If It were Me)	—	—	—	—	—	—	
2016	Dön Dünya (Spin, World)	—	—	—	—	—	—	
2018	Aşk Kovulmaz (Love Wouldn't Expel)	—	—	—	—	—	—	
2018	Reset (feat. Eypio)	1	—	—	—	—	—	
2019	Gel Bana (Come to Me)	2	—	—	—	—	—	
2019	Masum Gibi (Like an Innocent)	—	—	—	—	—	—	
2019	Mod (with Zeynep Bastık) (Mode)	1	—	—	—	—	—	
2020	Yanında (with Melis Fis & Defkhan) (By Your Side)	—	—	—	—	—	—	
2020	Damar (Vein)	1	—	—	—	—	—	
2021	Tekrar (with Doğu Demirkol) (Again)	—	—	—	—	—	—	
2021	Bizim Çocuklar (with Eypio, Derya Uluğ & Irmak Arıcı) (Our Kids)	—	—	—	—	—	—	
2021	Yoksay (with Indira Elemes) (Ignore)	—	—	—	—	—	—	
2022	Sonuna Kadar (with Murat Karahan) (Until the End)	—	—	—	—	—	—	
2023	Tamam Tamam (Alright Alright)	—	—	—	—	—	—	
2024	Sana İhtiyacım Var 2024 (with Olga Napoli) (I Need You)	—	—	—	—	—	—	
2024	İhtimal (Possibility)	—	—	—	—	—	—	
2025	Aşkına Destan (Love's Epic)	—	—	—	—	—	—	
2026	Geliversen (If You'd Come)	—	—	—	—	—	—	

== Appearances ==
Year	Title	Info
1996	Asya	Artist: Asya Genre: Turkish pop
1997	Emanet	Artist: İzel Genre: Turkish pop
1995	Adam	Artist: Sibel Alaş Genre: Turkish pop
