= Gülben Ergen discography =

- Studio albums: 11
- Singles: 8
- Video albums: 1
- Music videos: 53

This is the discography of Turkish pop singer Gülben Ergen, who has released ten studio albums and eight singles throughout her career.

== Albums ==
=== Studio albums ===
Year	Album	Certifications	Sales
1997	Merhaba: Released: 4 September 1997; Format: Cassette, CD		
1999	Kör Aşık: Released: December 1999; Format: Cassette, CD		
2002	Sade ve Sadece: Released: 2 June 2002; Format: Cassette, CD		
2004	Uçacaksın: Released: 25 February 2004; Format: Cassette, CD	MÜ-YAP: Diamond	Turkey: 600,000
2005	9+1 Fıkır Fıkır: Released: 2005; Format: Cassette, CD		
2006	Gülben Ergen: Released: 3 June 2006; Format: Cassette, CD	MÜ-YAP: Gold	Turkey: 180,000
2008	Aşk Hiç Bitmez: Released: 2 March 2008; Format: Cassette, CD	MÜ-YAP: Gold	Turkey: 106,000
2009	Uzun Yol Şarkıları: Released: 23 March 2009; Format: Cassette, CD		Turkey: 59,300
2011	Hayat Bi Gün: Released: 22 August 2011; Format: CD, digital download		Turkey: 50,000
2015	Kalbimi Koydum: Released: 19 October 2015; Format: CD, digital download		Turkey: 40,000
2020	Seni Kırmışlar: Released: 25 December 2020; Format: CD, digital download		

=== Live albums ===
Year	Album	Sales and certifications
2004	Gülben Ergen Live in İstanbul: Released: 2004; Format: DVD	

=== EPs ===
Year	Title	Sales and certifications
2025	GLBN: Released: 2025; Format: Digital download	

== Singles ==
Year	Title	Label / sales
2011	"Şıkır Şıkır": Released: 3 June 2011; Format: MC, CD, digital download	Seyhan Müzik / 163,243
2012	"Durdurun Dünyayı": Released: 17 August 2012; Format: CD, digital download	Seyhan Müzik
2013	"Sen": Released: 5 June 2013; Format: CD, digital download	DMC
2015	"Aşkla Aynı Değil": Released: 14 April 2015; Format: CD, digital download	DMC
2017	"Esasen": Released: 14 February 2017; Format: CD, digital download	DMC
2017	"Yansın Bakalım": Released: 8 December 2017; Format: CD, digital download	DMC
2018	"İnfilak": Released: 11 October 2018; Format: CD, digital download	DMC
2019	"Müsaadenle": Released: 17 May 2019; Format: CD, digital download	DMC
2020	"Bu Benim Hayatım": Released: 7 February 2020; Format: CD, digital download	DMC
2020	"23 Nisan Kutlu Olsun": Released: 15 April 2020; Format: CD, digital download	DMC
2023	"En Güzel Misafir": Released: 7 April 2023; Format: Digital download	DMC
2023	"Sen Gidince": Released: 27 October 2023; Format: Digital download	DMC
2024	"Nanik": Released: 12 July 2024; Format: Digital download	Ergen Müzik
2024	"Defoluyorum Kalbinden": Released: 20 November 2024; Format: Digital download	Ergen Müzik

== Charts ==
List of singles, release date and album name
Single	Year	Peak	Album
Single	Year	TR	Album
"Sürpriz"	2008	3	Aşk Hiç Bitmez
"Avrupa" (feat. Ege Çubukçu)	2008	4	Aşk Hiç Bitmez
"Bay Doğru"	2008	13	Aşk Hiç Bitmez
"Ya Ölümsün Ya Düğün"	2008	10	Aşk Hiç Bitmez
"Aşk Hiç Bitmez"	2008	33	Aşk Hiç Bitmez
"Giden Günlerim Oldu" (feat. Oğuzhan Koç)	2009	1	Uzun Yol Şarkıları
"Çilekli"	2009	14	Uzun Yol Şarkıları
"Üzgünüm"	2010	31	Uzun Yol Şarkıları
"Bir Şans Daha"	2010	20	Uzun Yol Şarkıları
"Şıkır Şıkır" (feat. Mustafa Sandal)	2011	1	Hayat Bi Gün
"Yarı Çıplak"	2011	4	Hayat Bi Gün
"Sen"	2013	2	Sen
"Kalbimi Koydum" (feat. Bora Duran)	2015	2	Kalbimi Koydum
"—" indicates that the songs were not included in the lists or the results were not disclosed.
