= Maxi Sandal 2003 / Moonlight =

EP by Mustafa Sandal
- Released: 25 June 2003
- Studio: Yada Productions (Istanbul, Turkey)
- Genre: Pop
- Length: 39:01
- Label: Erol Köse Productions
- Producer: Erol Köse

Mustafa Sandal chronology
KOP (2002)	Maxi Sandal 2003 / Moonlight (2003)	Seven (2003)

Maxi Sandal 2003 / Moonlight is the first Maxi Single (EP/hybrid album) released in 2003 of the Turkish pop singer Mustafa Sandal and the Greek pop singer Natalia.

== Track listing ==
- Maxi Sandal 2003 / Moonlight, 2003
1. "Aşka Yürek Gerek (Duet Natalia)" – – 5:46
2. "Moonlight (Duet Gülcan)" – – 3:59
3. "Yok Gerekçem (Duet Natalia)" – – 3:19
4. "En Kötü İhtimalle" – – 3:43
5. "Kop (Remix)" – – 4:13
6. "Aşka Yürek Gerek (Orient Mix) (Duet Natalia)" – – 4:05
7. "Aya Benzer (2003 Mix) (Duet Gülcan)" – – 3:59
8. "Aşka Yürek Gerek (Dance Mix) (Duet Natalia)" – – 4:40
9. "Aşka Yürek Gerek (Club Trance Mix) (Duet Natalia)" – – 7:20

== Credits ==
- Music direction, arrangements: Yıldıray Gürgen, Alain Konakoğlu, Serkan Dinçer, Bebe Cüneyt, Bülent Aris, Volga Tamöz, Altan Çetin
- Mixing: Alain Konakoğlu
- Publisher: Erol Köse
- Photography: Zeynel Abidin

== Music videos ==
- "Aşka Yürek Gerek"
- "Moonlight"
- "Aya Benzer (2003 Mix) (Duet Gülcan)"

== Trivia ==
- The song "Aşka Yürek Gerek" was a Turkish translation of the Greek folk song "Anaveis Foties"
- The Turkish translation was first sung by female Turkish pop singer Dilek Budak
