= Işıklı =

Işıklı is a Turkish name meaning (literally "luminous" or "with lights") and may refer to:

- Işıklı, Aydın, a village in Aydın district of Aydın Province, Turkey
- Işıklı, Enez
- Işıklı, Kozan, a village in Kozan district of Adana Province, Turkey
- Işıklı, Silifke, a village in Silifke district of Mersin Province, Turkey
- Işıklı Lake, a lake in western Turkey
- Işıklı, Mecitözü
- Işıklı, Mudanya
- Işıklı Dam, a dam in Turkey
- Işıklı, Viranşehir, a village in the district of Viranşehir, Şanlıurfa Province

== See also ==
- Işıklı Yol, a 2007 album by İzel
