= Ambrose of Belaya Krinitsa =

Old Believers' Metropolitan

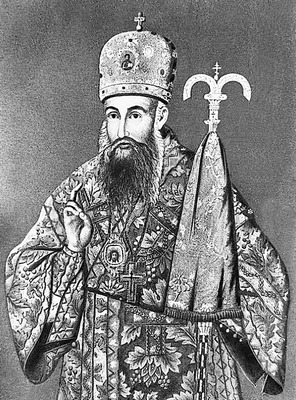
- Born: Amoireas Papageorgopolos; 1791; Maistra
- Died: 1863 (aged 71–72)
- Venerated in: Old Believers (Belokrinitskaya sects)
- Canonized: 11 November 1996 by Russian Orthodox Old-Rite Church
- Feast: November 12 (New Style)

Metropolitan Ambrose (Greek: Μητροπολίτης Αμβρόσιος, Russian: Митрополит Амворсий, born Amoirеas Papageorgopolos, Greek: Αμοιρέας Παπαγεωργόπουλος, Andrey Popovich, Russian: Андрей Попович; 1791–1863) was the first Old Believers' Metropolitan of the Ancient Orthodox Church also known later as Russian Orthodox Old-Rite Church.

== Early life ==
He was born in 1791 in village Maistros, Ottoman Empire (now Yenice, Enez District, Edirne Province, Turkey), at that time part of the Ottoman Empire. He was of Greek origin.

In 1811, he married, and shortly after was ordained as a priest by metropolitan Matthew (Megalos) of Enos. In 1814 he lost his wife, who had given birth to a son, named George after his grandfather. In 1817 he was elected Igumen (abbot) of the Monastery of the Holy Trinity on the island of Halki. Patriarch Constantine had him locum tenens of the patriarchal Greek Church in 1827. As is clear from a document dated 9 September 1835, he was ordained as a bishop of Sarajevo in Bosnia by Patriarch Gregory VI, assisted by four other bishops. He remained in his position for five years before being removed by the Ottoman authorities.

In Vienna, the Minister of Interior, Count Kolovrat, and Archduke Ludwig prepared the way for permission to be given by Ferdinand in 1844 to invite a foreign bishop to establish his headquarters in Belaya Krinitsa, to serve the needs of the Old Believers in the domains of the Empire. There existed for generations communities of Old Believers in Turkey who were European refugees from the persecutions in Russia, and it was a natural place to search for a bishop in order to establish an independent full Church Hierarchy. Osip Semenovich Goncharov, Ataman of the Nekrasov Cossacks, established contact between Bishop Ambrose and two Russian monks, Paul and Alimpius, who were searching for an orthodox bishop willing to join the Old Believers.

In 1846, Ambrose became an Old Believer and consecrated three Russian Old Believers priests as bishops.

A Serb, Costantino Efimovic, acted as an interpreter between metropolitan Ambrose and the monks. Paul and Alimpius examined the orthodox beliefs of Ambrose, who presented documents from the Patriarch of Constantinople which confirmed his canonical status. Bishop Ambrose and his son then took time to investigate the status of the Russian Orthodox Old canonry, before giving his consent on 15 April 1846.

== Conversion to the Old Faith ==
After a trip along the Danube, Bishop Ambrose, Paul and Alimpius arrived in Tulcea, in modern-day Romania, where 500 Nekrasov Cossacks, together with the monks of the monastery of Slavo-Rus, their Father and Igumen Makarii Arkadii Lavrentiyevskii, presented the Metropolitan the traditional tokens of hospitality: bread with salt. The government requested and obtained from the Patriarchate of Constantinople a favourable report on the bishop, before giving him permission to establish his residence in their domains. After a meeting to discuss the procedure for settlement of Ambrose, on 28 October 1846 he held the office Vigil in honour of St. Nicholas the Wonderworker. The following day, after having read the usual confession of faith in Slavonic, Bishop Ambrose was accepted according to Canon 95 of the Sixth Ecumenical Council. The priest monk Jerome, with the blessing of the first and the new Metropolitan of Belaya Krinitsa and all the Russian Old Believers, began the Divine Liturgy, celebrated by Ambrose.

The bishop read the prayers in his native language, Greek, but the deacon and the choir used Slavonic. Due to the absence of two other bishops, he used two archpriests, a procedure already used before in the history of the Church in cases of necessity, and described in some lives of saints. In August 1847 there was the ordination of Bishop Arcadius by Slava Russkaya, an ancient seat of an Orthodox monastery at Tulcea.

The Russian Foreign Ministry threatened to retaliate against the Roman Catholic government of the Habsburg Empire, if it did not withdraw the permission to the Old Believers to establish their own Metropolia in their lands. The Most Holy Synod, by which the Tsar had controlled the State Church since the abolition of the Patriarchate under Peter I, likewise threatened to cut all financial assistance from the Patriarchate of Constantinople, if it did not do everything in its power to induce the Metropolitan Ambrose to change its position. Metropolitan Ambrose, however, refused. The Old Believers convinced him that the system of the Most Holy Synod, established in 1700 by Peter I to check the status of the church in place of the patriarch, was not canonical. By decree of Tsar Paul I, the Russian rulers had declared "the Church" and all the bishops of the church had been obliged to honour an oath to that effect.

== Exile and death ==
In response to diplomatic pressure, the Austrian-Hungarian authorities closed the monastery of Belaya Krinitsa on 3 March 1848, and Metropolitan Ambrose was sent into exile in Cilli (now Celje, Slovenia). After the outbreak of revolutions in Vienna, and with the assistance of Count Kolovrat, the monastery of Belaya Krinitsa was reopened at the end of 1848, though the Metropolitan had to remain in exile. His successor was Anthony (Shutov), who became the first Old Believers' Archbishop of Moscow.

Metropolitan Ambrose lived fifteen years in exile and suffered from his isolation. Nonetheless he had assisted the Old Believers in their goal to establish a full Church Hierarchy, which he saw as the Will of God. On 28 October 1863 he sent his last official act as primate of the Russian Old Believer Archbishop Anthony and all the bishops under his jurisdiction. The document begins with the words: "For the mercy of God, the humble Archbishop and Metropolitan of all the Old-Rite Orthodox, Ambrose." In the text he expresses regret that he had lived so far away from his flock, and that his health did not allow him to do more, but that he remained open to discuss any issue relating to the church people under his spiritual care. This document clearly refuted allegations from some enemies of the Old Faith that wanted people to believe that the Holy Metropolitan had eventually rejected his flock.

Metropolitan Ambrose died in 1863. Metropolitan Cyril held his funeral at Belaya Krinitsa monastery, but the Metropolitan was buried in the Greek-Orthodox cemetery of Trieste.

== Canonization ==
At a joint synod held at the Monastery of Belaya Krinitsa 150 years after its acceptance of the primacy, Metropolitan Ambrosii was canonized on 11 November 1996, in the presence of both his successors, Metropolitan Leontii of Belaya Krinitsa and the Metropolitan Alimpii of Moscow and All Russia. The day of his feast was assigned to October 30 (November 12, according to the new calendar) each year. On 18/31 May 2000 Ambrosii's remains were exhumed and transferred from Trieste to Braila, Romania. Some years later, the monks Pavel and Alimpii were also canonized by the Old Believers.
