= Kalbimi Koydum =

Studio album by Gülben Ergen
- Released: 19 October 2015
- Genre: Pop
- Length: 54:09
- Language: Turkish
- Label: DMC
- Producer: Gülben Ergen - Taşkın Sabah

Gülben Ergen chronology
Sen (2013)	Kalbimi Koydum (2015)	Seni Kırmışlar (2020)

Singles from Kalbimi Koydum
- 1. "Aşkla Aynı Değil" Released: 14 April 2015

Kalbimi Koydum (I Placed My Heart...) is the tenth studio album by Turkish singer Gülben Ergen, released on 19 October 2015 by DMC.

== Release and content ==
Kalbimi Koydum was Ergen's first studio album in 4 years. It was also her first album being published by DMC after she ended her contract with Seyhan Müzik.

Commenting on the album, Ergen said: "We said to ourselves the winner is who puts his heart into what he does and then we set off. Good music is always at the top, and I hope out 5 years of labor shows a permanent success."

Ergen's duet song with Bora Duran, "Kalbimi Koydum", ranked first on iTunes Turkey. The album itself occupied the first position on iTunes Turkey's list upon release.

== Track listing ==
Kalbimi Koydum
No.	Title	Writer(s)	Composer(s)	Length
1.	"Yıkıl Karşımdan"	Mustafa Sandal	Sandal · Emina Jahović	4:02
2.	"Panda"	Altan Çetin	Çetin	3:43
3.	"Kalbimi Koydum" (feat. Bora Duran)	Bora Duran	Duran	3:58
4.	"Kusura Bakma"	Mert Ekren	Ekren	3:43
5.	"Aşkla Aynı Değil" (feat. Oğuzhan Koç)	Oğuzhan Koç	Koç	4:53
6.	"Yaklaş Yaklaş"	Çetin	Çetin	4:22
7.	"Sana Bıraktım"	Deniz Erten	Volga Tamöz	4:25
8.	"Özledim" (feat. İzel & Ercan Saatçi)	Ercan Saatçi	Saatçi	3:37
9.	"Pervane"	Özdemir Erdoğan	Erdoğan	3:24
10.	"Aşk Mı Para Mı"	Çetin	Çetin	3:22
11.	"Geçmişle Bir Derdim Yok"	Cansu Kurtçu	Kurtçu	3:10
12.	"Özelimsin"	Gülben Ergen	Emre Yücelen	4:08
13.	"Bugünün Sevdalısı"	Ayla Çelik	Bertan Arslan	3:33
14.	"Seninle Olmak Var Ya"	Eda Özülkü	Özülkü · Metin Özülkü	3:49
Total length:				54:09

== Release history ==
Country	Date	Format(s)	Label
Turkey	19 October 2015	CD · Digital download	DMC
Worldwide	26 October 2015	Digital download	DMC
