= ISTE =

ISTE may refer to:

- International Society for Technology in Education
- Indian Society for Technical Education
- ISTE Ltd

== See also ==
- İste, a 2004 maxi single by Mustafa Sandal
