= Şehitler =

Şehitler can refer to one of the following places in Turkey:

- Şehitler, Enez
- Şehitler, Narman

Şehitler as a surname:

- Alara Şehitler, German-Turkish football player
