= Aya Benzer 2003 =

Single by Mustafa Sandal

from the album Maxi Sandal 2003 / Moonlight
- Released: 2003
- Recorded: 2003
- Genre: Pop
- Length: 3:59 (Aya Benzer (2003 Mix) )
- Label: Universal Music
- Songwriter(s): Mustafa Sandal
- Producer(s): Erol Köse, Mustafa Sandal

Mustafa Sandal singles chronology
"Kopmam Lazım" (2002)	"Aya Benzer 2003" (2003)	"Araba 2004" (2004)

"Aya Benzer 2003" - The original version of this song is part of the Maxi Sandal 2003 / Moonlight Maxi single (EP/Hybrid album) by Turkish singer-songwriter Mustafa Sandal.

== Track listing ==
- Aya Benzer 2003, 2003
  - Track 1: "Aya Benzer 2003 (Duet Gülcan)" (3:59)
  - Track 2: "Moonlight (Duet Gülcan)" (3:59)
  - Track 3: "Aya Benzer 2003 (Duet Gülcan)" (3:59)
  - Track 4: "Aya Benzer 2003 [Extended Version] (Duet Gülcan)" (4:54)

== Notes ==
- Natalia was replaced on this single with Turkish-German TV personality Gülcan in the duets included in this album

== Charts ==
Chart (2003)	Peak position
Austria (Ö3 Austria Top 40)	40
Germany (GfK)	8
Switzerland (Schweizer Hitparade)	67
