= Peker =

Peker may refer to:

== Given name ==
- Peker Açıkalın (born 1963), Turkish actor

== Surname ==
- Ahmet Peker (born 1989), Turkish wrestler
- Hakan Peker (born 1961), Turkish dancer, songwriter, singer and music composer
- Kaya Peker (born 1980), Turkish professional basketball player
- Recep Peker (1889–1950), Turkish prime minister
- Sedat Peker (born 1970), Turkish organized crime boss
- Tamer Peker (born 1970), Turkish opera tic baritone
