= Emanet =

Studio album by İzel
- Released: 5 June 1997
- Recorded: Recorded at Raks Müzik (Istanbul, Turkey)
- Genre: Pop
- Label: Raks Müzik
- Producer: Ömer Rıza Çam

İzel chronology
Adak (1995)	Emanet (1997)	Bir Küçük Aşk (1999)

Emanet (On Hold) is the second solo studio album of Turkish pop singer İzel. This was also the first album in which Turkish pop singer Mustafa Sandal served as music director.

== Track listing ==
- Emanet, 1997
1. "Emanet" (featuring Mustafa Sandal) – 4:57
2. "Eyvallah" –
3. "Geyik Çıkabilir" –
4. "Bekle Biraz" –
5. "Sır" –
6. "Deli Gibi" –
7. "Acilen" –
8. "Nakış" –
9. "Hain" –
10. "Kızımız Olacaktı" –

== Credits ==
- Music direction, arrangements: İzel, Mustafa Sandal
- Mixing: İzel, Mustafa Sandal
- Publisher: Raks Müzik
- Photography: Raks Müzik

== Music videos ==
- Emanet on YouTube
- Eyvallah on YouTube
- Kızımız Olacaktı on YouTube
