= Vakıf, Enez =

Village in Turkey

Vakıf
- Village
- Location within Turkey Location within Marmara
- Country: Turkey
- Province: Edirne
- District: Enez
- Population (2022): 344
- Time zone: UTC+3 (TRT)

Vakıf is a village in the Enez District of Edirne Province in Turkey. The village had a population of 344 in 2022.
