= Gülçavuş, Enez =

Village in Turkey

Gülçavuş
- Village
- Location within Turkey Location within Marmara
- Coordinates: 40°37′N 26°10′E
- Country: Turkey
- Province: Edirne
- District: Enez
- Population (2022): 315
- Time zone: UTC+3 (TRT)

Gülçavuş is a village in the Enez District of Edirne Province in Turkey. The village had a population of 315 in 2022. The village is 152 km from the Edirne city center and 18 km from the Enez district center.
