= Büyükevren, Enez =

Village in Turkey

Büyükevren
- Village
- Location within Turkey Location within Marmara
- Coordinates: 40.6503°N 26.2278°E
- Country: Turkey
- Province: Edirne
- District: Enez
- Population (2022): 745
- Time zone: UTC+3 (TRT)

Büyükevren is a village in the Enez District of Edirne Province in Turkey. The village had a population of 745 in 2022.
