= Çavuşköy, Enez =

Village in Turkey

Çavuşköy
- Village
- Location within Turkey Location within Marmara
- Country: Turkey
- Province: Edirne
- District: Enez
- Population (2022): 392
- Time zone: UTC+3 (TRT)

Çavuşköy is a village in the Enez District of Edirne Province in Turkey. The village had a population of 392 in 2022.
