= Bebek (album) =

Studio album by İzel
- Released: 23 May 2001
- Genre: Pop
- Label: Universal Müzik
- Producer: Altan Çetin

İzel chronology
Bir Küçük Aşk (1999)	Bebek (2001)	Şak (2003)

Bebek (English: Baby) is İzel's fourth studio album. It was released in 2001. All of the songs are produced by Altan Çetin.

== Track listing ==
#	Title	lyrics by	music by
1	"Bebek"	Altan Çetin	Altan Çetin
2	"Haberin Olmaz"	Altan Çetin	Altan Çetin
3	"Kıyamadım"	Altan Çetin	Altan Çetin
4	"Geceler Kara"	Altan Çetin	Altan Çetin
5	"Şekerim"	Altan Çetin	Altan Çetin
6	"Vurmuşum"	Altan Çetin	Altan Çetin
7	"Efendim"	Altan Çetin	Altan Çetin
8	"Boşver"	Altan Çetin	Altan Çetin
9	"Çocuk Yüzünde"	Altan Çetin	Altan Çetin
10	"Son Arzum"	Altan Çetin	Altan Çetin

== Credits ==
Production: Universal Music
Producer: Altan Çetin
Mix: Erekli Tunç
Mastering: Ulaş Ağce/İmaj
Photographs: Nihat Odabaşı
Graphic Design: Sanart
Hair: Cem Doğan
Make-up: Alev

== Music videos ==
- Bebek on YouTube
- Kıyamadım on YouTube
- Geceler Kara on YouTube
- Haberin Olmaz on YouTube

== Charts ==
Chart (2001)	Peak position
Turkey (D&R Best-Selling)	4
