= Araba 2004 =

Single by Mustafa Sandal

from the album Seven New Version
- Released: 2004
- Recorded: 2004
- Genre: Pop
- Length: 3:53 (Araba (Single Version) )
- Label: Universal Music
- Songwriter: Mustafa Sandal
- Producers: Erol Köse, Mustafa Sandal

Mustafa Sandal singles chronology
"Aya Benzer 2003" (2003)	"Araba 2004" (2004)	"İsyankar" (2005)

Araba 2004 was a 2004 single by musician Mustafa Sandal from the album Seven New Version, carrying five versions of the song.

== Track list ==
- Araba 2004, 2004
  - Track 01: "Araba (single version)" (3:53)
  - Track 2: "Araba (extended version)" (4:34)
  - Track 3: "Araba (club mix)" (4:46)
  - Track 4: "Fıkra" (4:34)
  - Track 5: "Araba (instrumental version)" (3:52)

== Charts ==
Chart (2004)	Peak position
Germany Singles Top 100	32
Swiss Singles Top 100	85
