= Çeribaşı, Enez =

Village in Turkey

Çeribaşı
- Village
- Location within Turkey Location within Marmara
- Coordinates: 40.6647°N 26.2552°E
- Country: Turkey
- Province: Edirne
- District: Enez
- Population (2022): 188
- Time zone: UTC+3 (TRT)

Çeribaşı is a village in the Enez District of Edirne Province in Turkey. The village had a population of 188 in 2022.
