= Hisarlı, Enez =

Village in Turkey

Hisarlı
- Village
- Location within Turkey Location within Marmara
- Coordinates: 40°43′13″N 26°12′40″E
- Country: Turkey
- Province: Edirne
- District: Enez
- Population (2022): 137
- Time zone: UTC+3 (TRT)

Hisarlı is a village in the Enez District of Edirne Province in Turkey. The village had a population of 137 in 2022.
