= Aşktır Beni Güzel Yapan =

Studio album by Asya
- Released: 2007
- Label: Seyhan Müzik

Asya chronology
Dönmem Yolumdan (2002)	Aşktır Beni Güzel Yapan (2007)	Aşk İz Bırakır (2014)

Aşktır Beni Güzel Yapan (This is Love that Makes Me Beautiful) is an album by Turkish singer Asya. It is her fifth studio album, released in Turkey in 2007.

== Track listing ==
- "Kırmızı Kart" (Red Card)
- "Tesadüfen" (by Chance)
- "Gittin Gideli" (Since You have Gone)
- "Git Güle Güle" (Bye Bye)
- "Aşktır Beni Güzel Yapan" (This is Love That Makes Me Beautiful)
- "Canım" (Honey)
- "Senden Sonra" (After You)
- "Teslim Oldum Aşka" (I Surrender Myself to The Love)
- "Yaprak Döken Benim" (This is Me Who Patch off)
- "Yeter" (Enough)
