= Gölgede Aynı =

Studio album by Mustafa Sandal
- Released: 12 June 1996
- Studio: İstanbul Gelişim, Erekli Tunç (Istanbul, Turkey)
- Genre: Pop
- Length: 34:17
- Label: Özer Plak
- Producer: Şahin Özer

Mustafa Sandal chronology
Suç Bende (1994)	Gölgede Aynı (1996)	Detay (1998)

Gölgede Aynı (Same in the Shadow) is the second album released in 1996 of the Turkish pop singer Mustafa Sandal. This album is considered to be his most commercially successful album.

== Track listing ==
=== Original version ===
No.	Title	Writer(s)	Composer(s)	Length
1.	"Araba"	Mustafa Sandal	Mustafa Sandal	4:41
2.	"Kalmadı"	Mustafa Sandal	Mustafa Sandal	3:55
3.	"Denize Doğru"	Mustafa Sandal	Mustafa Sandal	4:09
4.	"Bir Tanem"	Mustafa Sandal	Mustafa Sandal	3:37
5.	"Bir Anda"	Mustafa Sandal	Mustafa Sandal	3:10
6.	"Gidenlerden"	Mustafa Sandal	Mustafa Sandal	3:56
7.	"Jest Oldu"	Hakkı Yalçın	Mustafa Sandal	4:14
8.	"Karanlığa Veda"	Mustafa Sandal	Mustafa Sandal	3:13
9.	"Oyalama"	Mustafa Sandal	Mustafa Sandal	3:32
10.	"İki Tas Çorba"	Mustafa Sandal	Bülent Tezcan	3:48
11.	"Daha Çok Vaktin Var"	Mustafa Sandal	Mustafa Sandal	4:13
12.	"Gölgede Aynı"	Mustafa Sandal	Mustafa Sandal	4:17
13.	"Bir Anda (Remix)"	Mustafa Sandal	Mustafa Sandal	4:34
Total length:				51:19

== Credits ==
- Music direction, arrangements: Mustafa Sandal
- Mixing: Marti Jane Robertson
- Publisher: Şahin Özer
- Photography: Sevil Sert

== Music videos ==
- "Araba"
- "Jest Oldu"
- "Bir Anda (Remix)"
