= Bir Dilek Tut Benim İçin =

Studio album by İzel
- Released: 29 April 2005
- Genre: Pop
- Label: Avrupa Müzik
- Producer: Sinan Akçıl

İzel chronology
Şak (2003)	Bir Dilek Tut Benim İçin (2005)	Işıklı Yol (2007)

Bir Dilek Tut Benim İçin (English: Make a Wish for Me) is İzel's sixth studio album. It was released in April 2005. This album has significant difference that she starts working with Sinan Akçıl. The songs in this album are mostly written by Sinan Akçıl. Additionally, there are three Sezen Aksu songs and one Özdemir Erdoğan song, called Aç Kapıyı.

== Track listing ==
#	Title	lyrics by	music by
1	"Sayın Her şeyi Bilen"	Aslızen Yentur	Aslızen Yentur
2	"Bir Dilek Tut Benim İçin" The song was adapted from the Egyptian artist Amr Diab (Tinsa Wahda - Leily Nahary album in 2004)	Sezen Aksu	Muhammed Yehya
3	"Git Burdan"	Sezen Aksu - Sinan Akçıl	Sinan Akçıl
4	"Direniyorum"	Sinan Akçıl	Sinan Akçıl
5	"Aç Kapıyı"	Özdemir Erdoğan	Özdemir Erdoğan
6	"Aşk Hakları"	Sinan Akçıl	Sinan Akçıl
7	"Güle Güle"	Sezen Aksu	Sezen Aksu
8	"Yalancı Dünya"	Sinan Akçıl	Sinan Akçıl
9	"Madem"	Sinan Akçıl	Sinan Akçıl
10	"Mutluluk Sorunu"	Sinan Akçıl	Sinan Akçıl
11	"Gülmek İçin"	Fecri Ebcioğlu	Fecri Ebcioğlu
12	"Anlayamazsın"	Sinan Akçıl	Sinan Akçıl

== Personnel ==
- Production – Avrupa Müzik
- Producer – Sinan Akçıl
- Mix – İmaj, Miam, Mod Yapım
- Mastering – (master&servant) Hamburg
- Photographs – Gül Gülbahar
- Graphic Design – Özlem Semiz
- Hair – Metin Aydın
- Make-up – Zehra Yılmaz

== Music videos ==
- Bir Dilek Tut Benim İçin on YouTube
- Sayın Her Şeyi Bilen on YouTube
- Git Burdan on YouTube
- Aşk Hakları on YouTube
