= Abdurrahim, Enez =

Village in Turkey

Abdurrahim
- Village
- Location within Turkey Location within Marmara
- Coordinates: 40°39′N 26°15′E
- Country: Turkey
- Province: Edirne
- District: Enez
- Population (2022): 269
- Time zone: UTC+3 (TRT)

Abdurrahim is a village in the Enez District of Edirne Province in Turkey. The village had a population of 269 in 2022.
