= Yazır, Enez =

Village in Turkey

Yazır
- Village
- Location within Turkey Location within Marmara
- Coordinates: 40°41′47″N 26°14′02″E
- Country: Turkey
- Province: Edirne
- District: Enez
- Population (2022): 115
- Time zone: UTC+3 (TRT)

Yazır is a village in the Enez District of Edirne Province in Turkey. The village had a population of 115 in 2022.
