= Eisai I Mousiki Mou =

Είσαι η Μουσική Μου

Studio album by Natalia
- Released: Greece November 28, 2005; Turkey June 16, 2006
- Genre: Pop, Greek folk
- Label: V2 Records, Yeni Dünya Müzik

Natalia chronology
Ola T'alla (2004)	Είσαι η Μουσική Μου (2005)

Eisai I Mousiki Mou (Greek: Είσαι η Μουσική Μου; English language: You are My Music) is the second studio album by Greek pop singer Natalia. It was released in November 2005. A second version of the album adapted to the Turkish music market titled "You're My Music / Sen Bana Şarkılar Söylettin" was released in 2006.

The album was awarded Platinum in Turkey in 2007.

== Track listing ==
=== Original release ===
- Είσαι η Μουσική Μου, 2005
1. "Eisai Aftos Pou Thelo"
2. "An M' Agapas"
3. "I Diki Mou Mousiki"
4. "Opos S' Agapisa"
5. "Syghorese Me"
6. "Ena Gramma"
7. "As To Tha Perasei"
8. "Pare Me Stin Agkalia Sou"
9. "Pos Pernane Oi Meres"
10. "Pos Ta Katapheres"
11. "An Eisai Antras"
12. "To Balkoni"
13. "Mono Ego"
14. "Pos Pernane Oi Meres" (Acoustic)
15. "4 in the Morning" (Mono Ego)

=== Turkish release ===
- You're My Music / Sen Bana Şarkılar Söylettin, 2006
1. "An M' Agapas"
2. "Sen Bana Şarkılar Söylettin"
3. "Eisai Aftos Pou Thelo"
4. "Senin Yüzünden"
5. "Syghorese Me"
6. "Ena Gramma"
7. "As To Tha Perasei"
8. "Kaçmam Lazım"
9. "Pare Me Stin Agkalia Sou"
10. "An Eisai Antras"
11. "To Balkoni"
12. "Opos S' Agapisa"
13. "4 in the Morning" (Mono Ego)
14. "Demek Ki"
15. "Eisai I Mousiki Mou"
16. "Pos Pernane Oi Meres" (Acoustic)
17. "Pos Ta Kataferes"
18. "Aşk Ölmeden"
