= İsyankar =

Single by Mustafa Sandal

from the album İste
- Released: 10 January 2005
- Genre: Pop
- Length: 3:51 (Beathoavenz Cut)
- Label: Universal Music
- Songwriter(s): Mustafa Sandal
- Producer(s): Erol Köse, Mustafa Sandal

Mustafa Sandal singles chronology
"Araba 2004" (2004)	"İsyankar" (2005)	"Yamalı Tövbeler" (2005)

"İsyankar" ("Rebellious") was Mustafa Sandal's fourth CD single and third to be internationally released. It was recorded and released in 2005.

== Track listing ==
=== Turkish release ===
- Track 1: "İsyankar" (Beathoavenz Cut) (featuring Gentleman) (3:51)
- Track 2: "İsyankar" (NAD Version) (featuring Gentleman) (4:06)
- Track 3: "İsyankar" (Sabor De Amor) (Punjabi MC Version) (featuring Gentleman) (4:01)
- Track 4: "İsyankar" (BH Real Mix) (featuring Gentleman) (4:23)
- Track 5: "İsyankar" (Kingstone's Senorita Remix) (featuring Gentleman) (3:13)
- Track 6: "İsyankar" (DJ Friction Club Mix) (featuring Gentleman) (4:21)
- Track 7: "İsyankar" (MeltDown Mix) (featuring Gentleman) (3:24)

=== German release ===
- Track 1: "İsyankar" (Beathoavenz Cut) (featuring Gentleman) (3:51)
- Track 2: "İsyankar" (NAD Version) (featuring Gentleman&Punjabi Mc) (4:06)
- Track 3: "İsyankar" (Sabor De Amor) (Punjabi MC Version) (featuring Gentleman) (4:01)
- Track 4: "İsyankar" (BH Real Mix) (featuring Gentleman) (4:23)
- Track 5: "İsyankar" (Kingstone's Senorita Remix) (featuring Gentleman) (3:13)
- Track 6: "İsyankar" (DJ Friction Club Mix) (featuring Gentleman) (4:21)
- Track 7: "İsyankar" (Jansen & Kowalski Kicks Galore Remix) (featuring Gentleman) (4:43)

== Charts ==
=== Weekly charts ===
Chart (2005)	Peak position
Austria (Ö3 Austria Top 40)	11
Germany (GfK)	6
Switzerland (Schweizer Hitparade)	4

=== Year-end charts ===
Chart (2005)	Position
Austria (Ö3 Austria Top 40)	75
Germany (Official German Charts)	30
Switzerland (Schweizer Hitparade)	10

=== Notes ===
- A remix featuring Punjabi MC was originally recorded for the album but taken out; it was later leaked onto the web in late 2005
