= Sultaniça, Enez =

Village in Turkey

Sultaniça
- Village
- Location within Turkey Location within Marmara
- Coordinates: 40°38′N 26°09′E
- Country: Turkey
- Province: Edirne
- District: Enez
- Population (2022): 985
- Time zone: UTC+3 (TRT)

Sultaniça is a village in the Enez District of Edirne Province in Turkey. The village had a population of 985 in 2022.
