= Asya (singer) =

- Born: Tülay Keçialan; March 1, 1965 (age 61); Eskişehir, Turkey
- Genres: Pop
- Occupations: Singer, songwriter
- Years active: 1990–present
- Label: Sony Music
- Website: Asya Fan Club

Asya (born 1 March 1965) is a Turkish pop singer and songwriter who appeared as backing vocalist for Nilüfer between 1990 and 1994. Her first album, Asya was released in 1994. She worked with Onno Tunç, Garo Mafyan, Mustafa Sandal, Gökhan Kırdar, Deneb Pinjo, İskender Paydaş and Özgür Buldum.

== Discography ==
=== Albums ===
- Asya (1994) (Yaşar Plak/1994)
- Asya (1996) (Yaşar Plak/1996)
- Masum (Innocent) (Yaşar Plak/1999)
- Dönmem Yolumdan (I don't Retract from My Way) (Sony Müzik Türkiye/2002)
- Aşktır Beni Güzel Yapan (This is Love That Makes Me Beautiful) (Seyhan Müzik/2007)
- Aşk İz Bırakır (Doğan Music Company/2014)

=== Singles ===
- Tesadüfen (Seyhan Müzik/2008)
- Unutup Gitti (Doğan Music Company/2020)
- Bizim Hikayemiz (Doğan Music Company/2022)
- Yalan Oldu ft. Ege (T-Ekspres/2024)

== Music videos ==
- Vurulmuşum Sana (I have Fallen in Love with You)
- Romantik Aşk (Romantic Love)
- Uçtum Seninle (I Flied With You)
- Yoksun Sen (You have Perished)
- Beni Aldattın (You Betrayed Me)
- İsyankar (Mutinous)
- Ayrılmak Zor (Parting with You is Hard)
- Masum (Innocent)
- Pişmanım (I've Repented)
- Olmadı Yar (No My Love)
- Nazara Geldik (Struck by The Evil Eye)
- Gittin Gideli (Since You have Gone)
- Git Güle Güle (Go, Bye Bye)
