= Kushtdepdi =

Turkmen dance

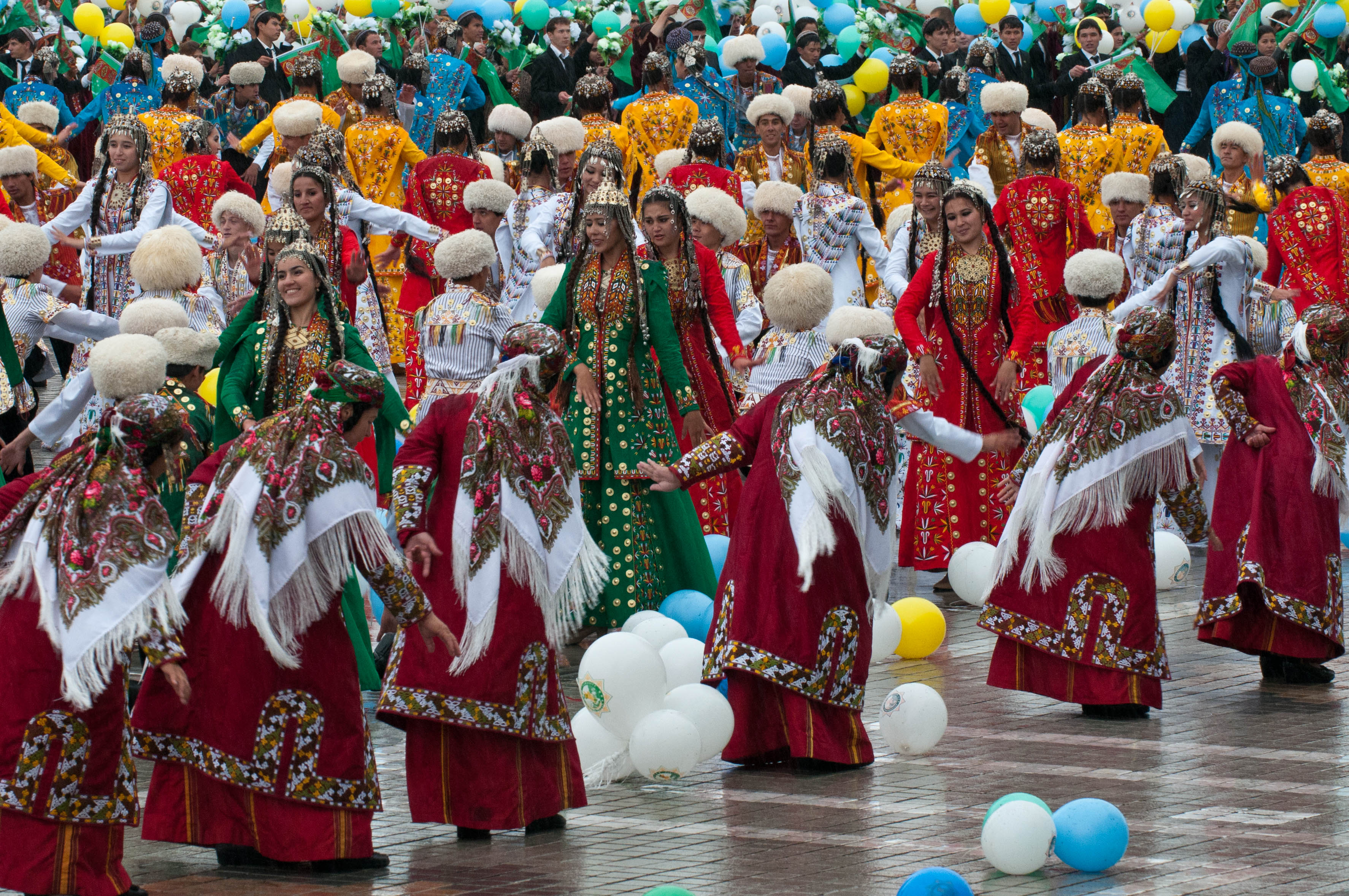
- Küştdepdi in Ashgabat during the 20th anniversary of Turkmenistan Independence celebrations (2011)
- Medium: Ritual and folk dance
- Originating culture: Turkmenistan

Kushtdepdi rite of singing and dancing
- UNESCO Intangible Cultural Heritage
- Country: Turkmenistan
- Reference: 01259
- Region: Asia and the Pacific

Inscription history
- Inscription: 2017 (12th session)
- List: Representative

Küştdepdi is a form of performing arts characteristic of Turkmenistani culture, combining improvised poetry, dance, and song. Küştdepdi has been preserved as a ritual and entertainment component of traditional celebrations.

In 2017, the tradition was inscribed on the Representative List of the Intangible Cultural Heritage of Humanity in English as the Kushtdepdi rite of singing and dancing and in Turkmen as Küştdepdi aýdym we tans dessury.

== Characteristics ==
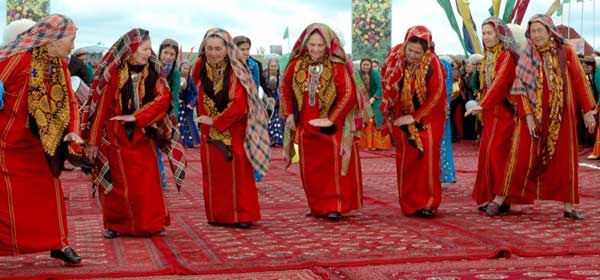
Kushtdepdi dancing

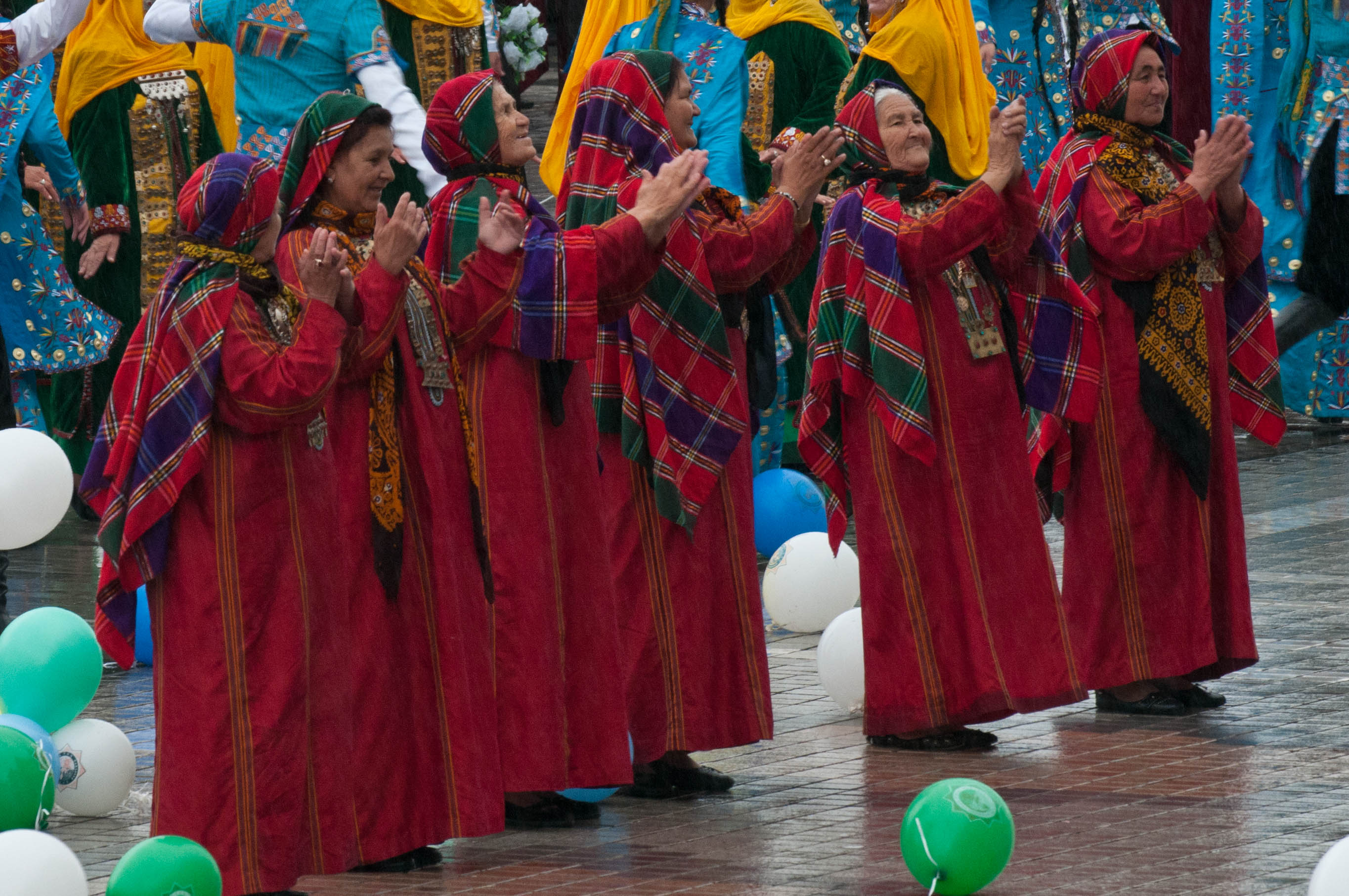
Turkmen women celebrating the 20th year of independence in Turkmenistan with Kushtdepdi dance

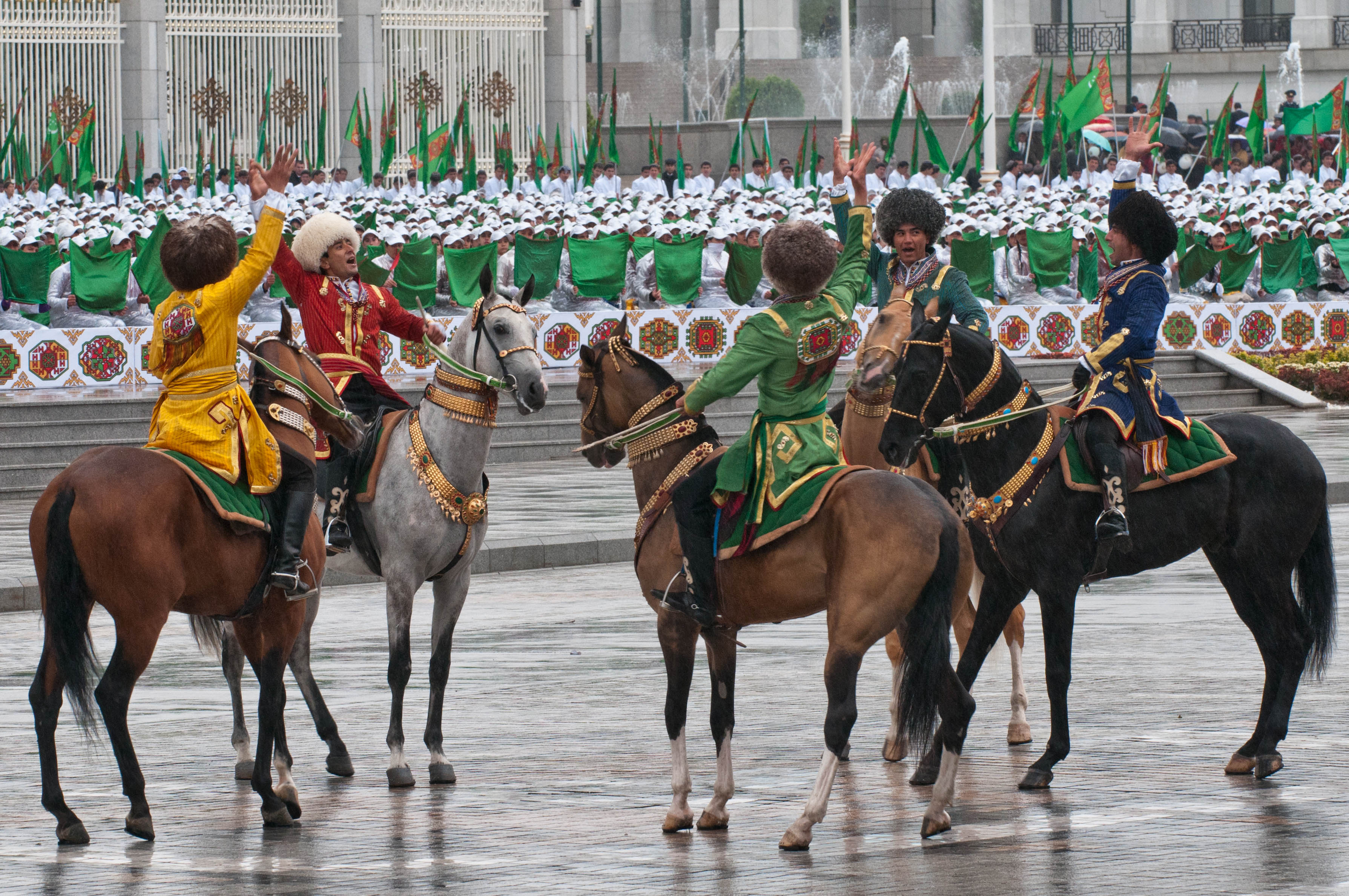
Küştdepdi performed with Ahal-Teke horses (2011)

The Küştdepdi ritual involves improvised poetry focusing on positive emotions, happiness, well-being, mutual respect, and solidarity. Küştdepdi is integral to state ceremonies, celebrations, and family events like births and weddings.

The improvised singing is accompanied by dances featuring characteristic gestures, hand movements, and steps timed to the melody. The ritual begins with a song by a group of seated, respected women in traditional dress, offering wishes of happiness and moral messages to younger generations. In the main ritual, a pair of singers (traditionally a man and a woman) perform poetry while surrounded by dancers forming partially or completely closed circles. The dancers begin with three steps on the right foot, followed by simultaneous stomping and clapping to symbolize the expulsion of evil and misfortune. Audience clapping and the lead singer's vocalizations (typically male, expressing "ha-uhha-ha" or "oyha-oy") set the dance rhythm. The event concludes with a prayer to nature for fertility, solidarity, and peace.

Master practitioners (both women and men) pass their theoretical and practical knowledge to students informally. Formal education takes place in specialized music schools and cultural centers. Community members sustain the tradition's vitality by participating in these celebrations, while residents and government institutions collaborate to create educational materials about the ritual.

Küştdepdi is performed by people across different social strata, organized into folklore groups totaling roughly 350 members as of 2017 (including one children's group). Although primarily concentrated in western Turkmenistan (the Balkan Province along the Caspian Sea), the practice is also present to a lesser extent in the Ahal, Mary, Daşoguz, and Lebap provinces.

== International recognition ==
On December 7, 2017, the Intergovernmental Committee for the Safeguarding of the Intangible Cultural Heritage in Jeju, South Korea, unanimously inscribed the Kushtdepdi rite of singing and dancing on the UNESCO Intangible Cultural Heritage Lists.

== Performance in foreign languages ==
The song Kushtdepdi has been performed in several other languages. Turkish singer Mustafa Sandal performed a Turkish version, Turkmen-Armenian singer Arsen Shakhunts it in Russian, and Tajik singer Mehrnigar Rustam performed it in Uzbek.
