= Bir Küçük Aşk =

Studio album by İzel
- Released: 7 May 1999
- Genre: Pop
- Label: Universal Music

İzel chronology
Emanet (1997)	Bir Küçük Aşk (1999)	Bebek (2001)

Bir Küçük Aşk (English: A Small Love) is İzel's third studio album. All of the lyrics were written by Altan Çetin. "Yok Yere" made a huge success all over Turkey.

== Track listing ==
All tracks are written by Altan Çetin.

No.	Title	Length
1.	"Yok Yere"
2.	"Yelken"
3.	"Galibi Sen"
4.	"Unutmak"
5.	"Dayanamam"
6.	"Ya Sus"
7.	"Bir Küçük Aşk"
8.	"Beni Bırak"
9.	"Elele"
10.	"Çarşaf"

== Credits ==
Production: Universal Music
Producer: Altan Çetin
Mix: Erekli Tunç
Mastering: Çağlar Türkmen
Photographs: Koray Kasap
Graphic Design: Feridun Ertaşkan
Hair: Cem Doğan
Make-up: Selda Çakır

== Music videos ==
- Yok Yere on YouTube
- Yelken on YouTube
- Galibi Sen on YouTube

== Charts ==
Chart (1999)	Peak position
Turkey (D&R Best-Selling)	1 (2 weeks)
