= Çandır, Enez =

Village in Turkey

Çandır
- Village
- Location within Turkey Location within Marmara
- Coordinates: 40.7294°N 26.2661°E
- Country: Turkey
- Province: Edirne
- District: Enez
- Population (2022): 10
- Time zone: UTC+3 (TRT)

Çandır is a village in the Enez District of Edirne Province in Turkey. The village had a population of 10 in 2022.
