= Gülcan =

Gülcan is a feminine Turkish given name meaning "rose soul". Notable people with the name include:

- Gülcan Kamps (born 1982), Turkish-German TV presenter
- Gülcan Koca (born 1990), Turkish-Australian footballer
- Gülcan Mıngır (born 1989), Turkish middle-distance runner
- Gülcan Paksoy (born 2004), Turkish hockey player
- Gülcan Tügel (born 2000), Turkish handball player
