= Ola T'alla =

Studio album by Natalia
- Released: 2004
- Recorded: Recorded at NR1 ("Number One"), Turkey
- Genre: Turkish pop, Greek folk, Turkish folk
- Label: NR1

Natalia chronology
Ola T'alla (2004)	Είσαι η Μουσική Μου (2005)

Ola T'alla is the first studio album by Greek pop singer Natalia. It was released in 2004 under Turkish record label NR1.

== Track listing ==
1. "Ola T'alla"
2. "Eheis To Kouragio Gi' Agapi" (Cesaretin Varmı Aska)
3. "Tha Melanholiso"
4. "Anassa"
5. "Come Away With Me"
6. "Poses Fores"
7. "Tha Melanholiso" (remix)
8. "Anassa" (remix)
9. "Ola T' Alla" (remix)
