= Karaincirli, Enez =

Village in Turkey

Karaincirli
- Village
- Location within Turkey Location within Marmara
- Coordinates: 40°38′N 26°18′E
- Country: Turkey
- Province: Edirne
- District: Enez
- Population (2022): 581
- Time zone: UTC+3 (TRT)

Karaincirli is a village in the Enez District of Edirne Province in Turkey. The village had a population of 581 in 2022.
