= Yamalı Tövbeler =

EP by Mustafa Sandal
- Released: 25 July 2005
- Studio: Otto Sound Room (Istanbul, Turkey)
- Genre: Pop
- Length: 33:40
- Label: Erol Köse Productions
- Producer: Erol Köse, Mustafa Sandal

Mustafa Sandal chronology
Seven Reloaded (2005)	Yamalı Tövbeler (2005)	Devamı Var (2007)

Yamalı Tövbeler is the third Maxi Single (EP/hybrid album) released in 2005 of the Turkish pop singer Mustafa Sandal.

== Track listing ==
- Yamalı Tövbeler, 2005
1. "Yamalı Tövbeler" – – 3:45
2. "Yamalı Tövbeler (Akustik) (Bonova)" – – 4:34
3. "İsyankar (Panjabi MC Version) (Featuring Gentleman)" – – 4:05
4. "Kopmam Lazım (Retro Version)" – – 4:13
5. "Araba 2005 (Summer Tone)" – – 3:55
6. "Yamalı Tövbeler (Sense & Trance)" – – 5:19
7. "İsyankar (Kingstone's Senorita Remix)" – – 3:17
8. "Yamalı Tövbeler (Calisun) (Featuring İlhan Erşahin)" – – 4:32

== Credits ==
- Music direction, arrangements: Emre Irmak
- Mixing: Serkan Kula
- Publishing: Polydor Island Group – a division of Universal Music GmbH
- Photography: Zeynel Abidin

== Music videos ==
- "Yamalı Tövbeler"

== Trivia ==
- A concert recording of this song was downloaded by many users one week before the official release
