= Kocaali, Enez =

Village in Turkey

Kocaali
- Village
- Location within Turkey Location within Marmara
- Coordinates: 40°39′59″N 26°20′45″E
- Country: Turkey
- Province: Edirne
- District: Enez
- Population (2022): 181
- Time zone: UTC+3 (TRT)

Kocaali is a village in the Enez District of Edirne Province in Turkey. The village had a population of 181 in 2022.
