= Detay =

Studio album by Mustafa Sandal
- Released: 1 September 1998
- Studio: İstanbul Gelişim, Veglobe (Istanbul, Turkey)
- Genre: Pop
- Length: 48:17
- Label: Prestij Müzik
- Producer: Hilmi Topaloğlu, Burhan Aydemir, Mahsun Kırmızıgül

Mustafa Sandal chronology
Gölgede Aynı (1996)	Detay (1998)	Araba (2000)

Detay (Detail) is the third studio album released in 1998 by Turkish pop singer Mustafa Sandal.

== Track listing ==
No.	Title	Writer(s)	Composer(s)	Length
1.	"Aya Benzer"	Mustafa Sandal	Mustafa Sandal	3:56
2.	"Top"	Mustafa Sandal	Mustafa Sandal	4:06
3.	"Bombacı"	Deneb Pinjo	Uğur Başar, Andy Clayburn	3:04
4.	"Teyze"	Mustafa Sandal	Mustafa Sandal	4:24
5.	"Onca"	Mustafa Sandal	Mustafa Sandal	5:31
6.	"Detay"	Mustafa Sandal	Mustafa Sandal	3:35
7.	"Çekilin"	Mustafa Sandal	Mustafa Sandal	4:50
8.	"Mevcut"	Mert Ekren	Bülent Tezcan	3:33
9.	"Ya Da"	Hakkı Yalçın	Uğur Başar	3:16
10.	"Niyet"	Mustafa Sandal	Mustafa Sandal	3:51
11.	"Bir Başka"	Mustafa Sandal	Bülent Tezcan	4:04
12.	"Ve"	Mustafa Sandal	Bülent Tezcan	3:59
Total length:				48:17

== Personnel ==
- Mustafa Sandal, Bülent Tezcan – music direction
- Deneb Pinjo – mixing
- Prestij Müzik – publishing
- Koray Kasap – photography

== Music videos ==
- "Aya Benzer"
- "Detay"
- "Çekilin"
- "Mevcut"
