= İste =

EP by Mustafa Sandal
- Released: 10 May 2004
- Studio: Yada Production Studios (Istanbul, Turkey); Booya Studios (Hamburg, Germany)
- Genre: Pop
- Length: 40:13
- Label: Erol Köse Productions
- Producer: Erol Köse, Mustafa Sandal

Mustafa Sandal chronology
Seven New Version (2004)	İste (2004)	Seven Reloaded (2005)

İste (Ask for It) is the second Maxi Single (EP/hybrid album) released in 2004 of the Turkish pop singer Mustafa Sandal.

== Track listing ==
No.	Title	Length
1.	"İsyankar"	3:54
2.	"Kavrulduk"	3:60
3.	"Gel Aşkım"	3:58
4.	"Fıkra"	4:36
5.	"All My Life" (Remix)	3:38
6.	"İsyankar" (Oryantal Remix)	3:46
7.	"Gel Aşkım" (Remix)	4:06
8.	"Story"	3:49
9.	"All My Life"	3:48
10.	"Özetle"	4:38

== Credits ==
- Music direction, arrangements: Mustafa Sandal, Özgür Yedievli, Emre Irmak, Bülent Aris
- Mixing: Serkan Kula, Bülent Aris, Serdar Ağırlı
- Publishing: Yada Music
- Photography: Zeynel Abidin

== Music videos ==
- "İsyankar" (This song had two music videos, one for the original version and one for the Beathoavenz Cut version featuring Gentleman)
- "Kavrulduk"
- "Gel Aşkım"
- "All My Life"

== Controversy ==
- The song "İsyankar" was believed to plagiarize parts from an older Punjabi MC song. However, this was never tracked and in 2005 Mustafa Sandal recorded a remix version of the song featuring Punjabi MC
