= Şehitler, Enez =

Village in Turkey

Şehitler
- Village
- Location within Turkey Location within Marmara
- Coordinates: 40.6911°N 26.2925°E
- Country: Turkey
- Province: Edirne
- District: Enez
- Population (2022): 236
- Time zone: UTC+3 (TRT)

Şehitler is a village in the Enez District of Edirne Province in Turkey. The village had a population of 236 in 2022.
