= Işıklı Yol =

Studio album by İzel
- Released: 5 June 2007
- Genre: Pop
- Length: 54:58
- Label: Avrupa Müzik
- Producer: Sinan Akçıl

İzel chronology
Bir Dilek Tut Benim İçin (2005)	Işıklı Yol (2007)	Jazz Nağme (2010)

Işıklı Yol (English: Road with Lights) is İzel's seventh studio album. It was released in 2007. This album has songs mostly written by Sinan Akçıl.

== Track listing ==
#	Title	lyrics by	music by
1	"Belli mi Olur"	Sinan Akçıl	Sinan Akçıl
2	"Hevesimi Kırma"	Sinan Akçıl	Sinan Akçıl
3	"Hatalım"	Sinan Akçıl	Sinan Akçıl
4	"Herşey Ayrı"	Fettah Can	Fettah Can
5	"Boş Yere"	Sinan Akçıl	Sinan Akçıl
6	"Bir Sene Oldu"	Sinan Akçıl	Sinan Akçıl
7	"Sana Ne Kadar"	Sinan Akçıl	Sinan Akçıl
8	"Sayende"	Sinan Akçıl	Sinan Akçıl
9	"Gurur"	Sinan Akçıl	Sinan Akçıl
10	"Taksi"	Sinan Akçıl	Sinan Akçıl
11	"Gelişi Güzel Değil"	Sinan Akçıl	Sinan Akçıl
12	"Işıklı Yol"	Fettah Can	Fettah Can

== Credits ==
Production: Avrupa Müzik
Producer: Sinan Akçıl
Mix: DM Müzik, Bahia Music, RMS
Mastering: Soundgarden (Hamburg)
Photographs: Lara Sayılgan
Graphic Design: Özlem Semiz
Hair: Turhan Çakar
Make-up: Neriman Eröz

== Music videos ==
- Belli mi Olur on YouTube
- Gurur on YouTube
- Hevesimi Kırma on YouTube
