= Seven (Mustafa Sandal album) =

Studio album by Mustafa Sandal
- Released: 1 October 2003
- Studio: Universal Music Germany (Berlin, Germany)
- Genre: Pop
- Length: 71:48
- Label: Universal Music Germany
- Producer: Bülent Aris

Mustafa Sandal chronology
Maxi Sandal 2003 / Moonlight (2003)	Seven (2003)	Seven New Version (2004)

Seven New Version

Studio album (reissue) by Mustafa Sandal
- Released: 2004
- Recorded: Recorded at Booya Studios (Hamburg, Germany)
- Genre: Pop
- Length: 40:24
- Label: Universal Music Germany
- Producer: Bülent Aris

Mustafa Sandal chronology
Seven (2003)	Seven New Version (2004)	İste (2004)

Seven is second internationally released album in 2003 by the Turkish pop singer Mustafa Sandal and his seventh album.

In 2004, the album was re-released under the title Seven New Version. This was his third internationally released album.

== Track listing ==
- Seven, 2003
1. "Gel Aşkım" – – 3:53
2. "All My Life" – – 3:42
3. "Aya Benzer 2003" – – 3:58
4. "Kopmam Lazım (Retro Version)" – – 4:02
5. "Fıkra" – – 4:19
6. "Araba 2004" – – 4:48
7. "Story" – – 3:44
8. "Knife" – – 4:19
9. "She's in Love" – – 2:50
10. "Moonlight" – – 3:58
11. "Aşka Yürek Gerek (Solo Version)" – – 4:27
12. "Suç Bende (Magic Version)" – – 4:32
13. "Bonus Track" – – 4.19
- Seven New Version, 2004
1. "Gel Aşkım" – – 3:53
2. "All My Life" – – 3:42
3. "Aya Benzer (Moonlight)" – – 3:58
4. "Kopmam Lazım (Retro Version)" – – 4:02
5. "Fıkra" – – 4:19
6. "Araba (Single Version)" – – 3:51
7. "Story" – – 3:44
8. "Knife" – – 4:19
9. "Moonlight (feat. Gülcan)" – – 3:58
10. "No Name" – – 4:38

== Credits ==
- Music direction, arrangements: Bülent Aris
- Mixing: Bülent Aris
- Publishing: Polydor Island Group
- Photography: Zeynel Abidin

== Music videos ==
- "Gel Aşkım"
- "All My Life"
- "Araba"
