= Organik (album) =

Studio album by Mustafa Sandal
- Released: 1 May 2012
- Genre: Pop
- Length: 49:49
- Label: Poll

Mustafa Sandal chronology
Karizma (2009)	Organik (2012)

Organik (Organic) is the studio album released in 2012 by Turkish singer Mustafa Sandal.

Prior to the release of this album, Sandal had stated that he would not release any new albums due to his focus on television and cinematic projects, and this period lasted for almost three years. In December 2011, it was reported that beside his appearance as a judge on O Ses Türkiye he was working hard on his new studio album. In May 2011, it was announced that the album would be released in late summer. Mustafa Sandal later said that the songs in this album would have the spirit of his works in the 1990s. He made the album's lead single, "Ego", available for download on Turkcell's platform before the album's release. On 6 June 2012, "Ego" was made available on all digital platforms and on 11 June 2012 the album itself was released.

While the album was expected, Mustafa Sandal explained the reason for this delay through a video he posted on his official YouTube channel.

The arrangement for the songs found in Organik were done by Volga Tamöz, Seçkin Özer, and Ödül Erdoğan. The album includes songs written and composed by Eflatun, Soner Sarıkabadayı, Amr Mostafa, and Deniz Erten. Sandal himself wrote and composed six of the album's songs and composed five of them. For the song "Çek Gönder", Sandal performed a duet with his then-wife Emina Sandal. The album's photographs were taken by artist Ceylan Atınç. Organik's only music video was released for the song "Ego", which was in the format of an action short video.

== Track listing ==
No.	Title	Writer(s)	Composer(s)	Length
1.	"Ego"	Mustafa Sandal	Mustafa Sandal	3:15
2.	"Kafası Bu"	Mustafa Sandal	Mustafa Sandal	3:19
3.	"Neler Neler"	Soner Sarıkabadayı	Soner Sarıkabadayı	3:07
4.	"Yok Öyle Bi' Dünya"	Mustafa Sandal	Mustafa Sandal	4:26
5.	"Kum"	Deniz Erten	Volga Tamöz	3:46
6.	"Çek Gönder" (feat. Emina Sandal)	Mustafa Sandal	Mustafa Sandal	3:46
7.	"Kurşun Geçirmez"	Eflatun	Eflatun	4:46
8.	"Ego" (Acoustic Version)	Mustafa Sandal	Mustafa Sandal	3:56
9.	"Bi' Git Bakalım"	Mustafa Sandal	Amr Mostafa	3:40
10.	"Organik"	Mustafa Sandal	Mustafa Sandal	3:40
Total length:				49:49

== Sales ==
Country	Sales
Türkiye (MÜ-YAP)	45,999
