= Enez District =

District of Edirne Province, Turkey

- District
- Map showing Enez District in Edirne Province

- Location in Turkey Enez District (Marmara)
- Coordinates: 40°41′N 26°11′E
- Country: Turkey
- Province: Edirne
- Seat: Enez

Government
  - Kaymakam: Cafer Ekinci
- Area: 455 km^{2} (176 sq mi)
- Population (2022): 10,488
  - Density: 23.1/km^{2} (59.7/sq mi)
- Time zone: UTC+3 (TRT)
- Website: www.enez.gov.tr

Enez District is a district of the Edirne Province of Turkey. Its seat is the town of Enez. Its area is 455 km^{2}, and its population is 10,488 (2022).

== Composition ==
There is one municipalities in Enez District:

- Enez

There are 19 villages in Enez District:

- Abdurrahim
- Büyükevren
- Çandır
- Çavuşköy
- Çeribaşı
- Gülçavuş
- Hasköy
- Hisarlı
- Işıklı
- Karaincirli
- Kocaali
- Küçükevren
- Şehitler
- Sultaniça
- Sütçüler
- Umurbey
- Vakıf
- Yazır
- Yenice
