= Natalia (Greek singer) =

- Also known as: Natalia, Natalia Dusso
- Born: Natalia Doussopoulou; 8 April 1983 (age 43); Athens, Greece
- Genres: Pop, R&B dance pop, techno, hip hop, Rock
- Occupations: Singer, actor
- Years active: 2000–present
- Spouse: George Maltezos (m. 2020)
- Website: www.nataliadusso.com

Natalia Doussopoulou (Greek: Ναταλία Δουσσοπούλου; born 8 April 1983), known professionally as Natalia and Natalia Dusso is a Greek pop singer with popularity both in Greece and Turkey. Her professional career began with duets with Turkish singer Mustafa Sandal and led to a solo career and several albums.

== Biography ==
=== 1983–99: Early life ===
Natalia Doussopoulou was born on 8 April 1983 in Athens, Greece. Six months after she was born, her family moved to London, England. Until age 14, Doussopoulou attended a Greek school in England called the Hellenic College of London. During this time, she was a competitive swimmer. Throughout her swimming experience, she participated in the World Cup games of Glasgow, London, and Greece. Later that year, Doussopoulou traveled to Florida for one year to attend the Pine Crest Secondary school. Afterwards, she continued her education at the American School of London. At the school, she developed her interest in music and recorded her first demo songs in London and in Sweden soon after. By 1999, established Greek-singers Anna Vissi and Nikos Karvelas had invited her to be part of Vissi's summer residency at Asteria Club in Glyfada, Greece, giving her professional exposure.

=== 2000–present: Career ===
In late 1999, Doussopoulou met Turkish pop singer Mustafa Sandal with whom she performed a duet for his upcoming album Akışına Bırak. The song was originally a Greek/Egyptian song called "Eleos", performed by Angela Dimitriou and Amr Diab. A music video was filmed and a national tour followed. After her success with Mustafa Sandal, Doussopoulou moved to New York for a year to record more music and demos that included a wider variety of elements and influences. During this time, Doussopoulou met P. Diddy and other various rappers. She collaborated with one of P. Diddy's ex-producers from Bad Boy Records and recorded an original soul demo with rock elements. After writing and recording songs in Delaware, Doussopoulou scanned the New York City market to find a record label for herself. This search included Arista, Murder Inc., Def Jam Records, Sony, Universal, j Records and many others. Doussopoulou ended up not signing to a label and instead flew to Los Angeles, meeting with Jimmy Iovine, the chairman of Universal Records and other music executives.

While in the US, her previously released song with Mustafa Sandal was fairing well, prompting a return to Turkey to record a second duet with him titled "Anaveis Foties" (called "Aşka Yürek Gerek" in Turkey), as well as additional duets for his songs "Aya Benzer" (also translated into English as "Like the Moon") and "Yok Gerekçem" in Mustafa Sandal's album Maxi Sandal 2003 / Moonlight. "Aşka Yürek Gerek" reached number one in Turkey, making Doussopoulou one of the youngest singers to reach number one in Turkey. She soon signed with Turkish record label NR1 ("Number One") and released her first solo maxi single "Ola T'alla" which reached number one in the Turkish foreign album charts.

Because of her career in Turkey, she was offered a role in the Turkish show Yabancı Damat (Foreign Groom) as the girlfriend of the groom. The show was successful, with the cast winning best TV series of the year in 2004. The show was translated into Greek and was aired by MEGA which raised awareness of Natalia. In 2005, she left NR1 and signed onto V2 Greece. Her next album, Eisai I Mousiki Mou was released in Greece in December 2005 and in early 2006 in Turkey. The album was of the alternative rock genre and except for two songs, was written and composed by Doussopoulou. The Turkish version of the album included five of the Greek-language songs translated into Turkish.

== Discography ==
=== Albums ===
Year	Title
2003	Ola T'alla
2005	Eisai I Mousiki Mou (You're My Music / Sen Bana Şarkılar Söylettin)
2011	L.A. Woman (You Mother)
2012	Make It Rain

=== Singles ===
Year	Title	Label
2011	"Out of Control"	Phoenix Records
2017	"Simera Eho Tin Giorti Mou"	RBI Müzik
2019	"De Ftais Esi"	RBI Müzik
2019	"Papa"	Digital Ray Records
2019	"Ama Thes Na Xereis"	Digital Ray Records
2021	"You Will Be My King"	Digital Ray Records
2021	"Turn It Up"	Natalia Dusso Self-released
