= Yenice, Enez =

Village in Turkey

Yenice
- Village
- Location within Turkey Location within Marmara
- Country: Turkey
- Province: Edirne
- District: Enez
- Population (2022): 726
- Time zone: UTC+3 (TRT)

Yenice is a village in the Enez District of Edirne Province in Turkey. The village had a population of 726 in 2022.
