= Gülcan Kamps =

German television presenter

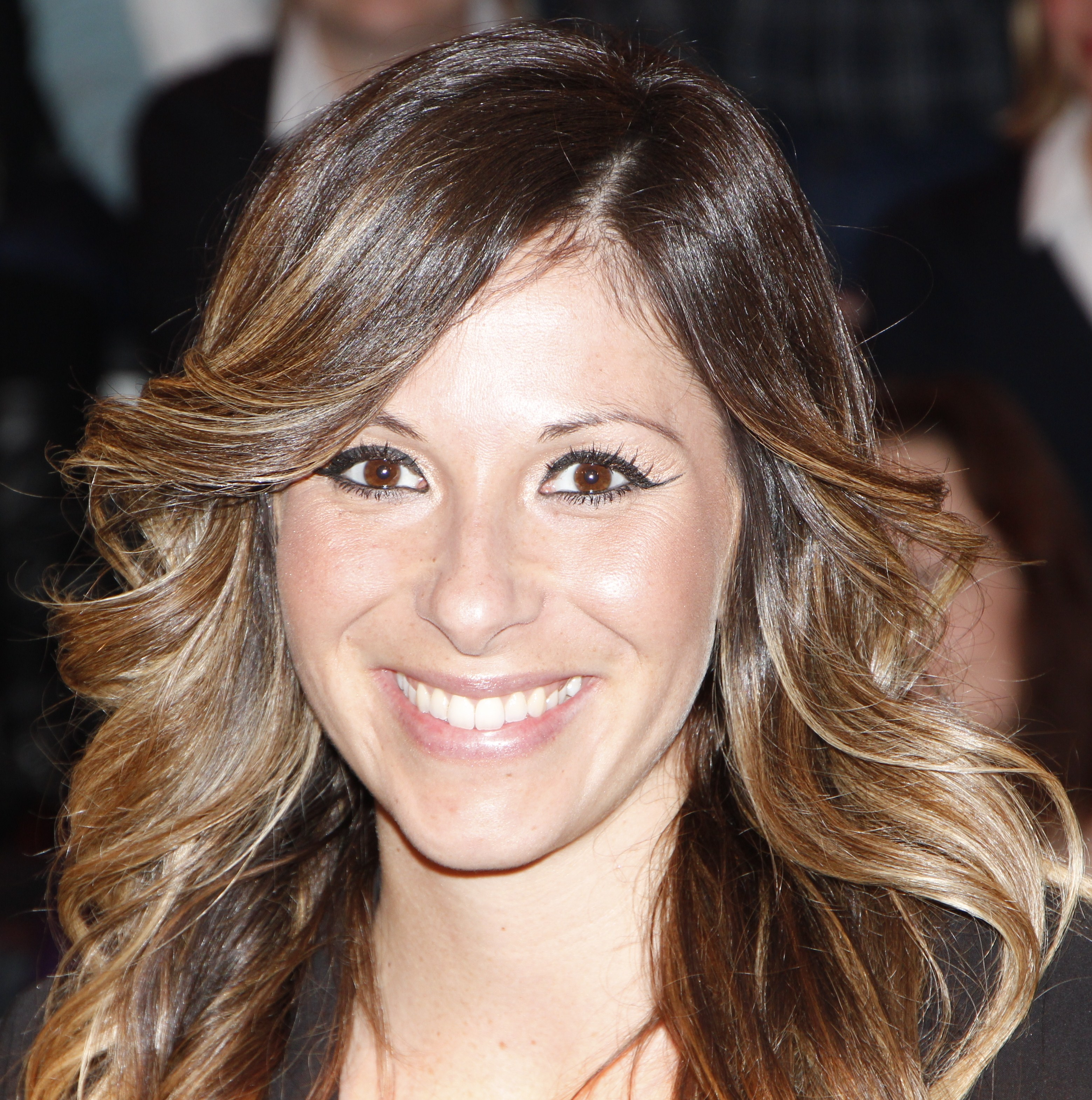
- Gülcan Kamps
- Born: Gülcan Karahancı; 20 September 1982 (age 44); Lübeck, West Germany
- Other name: Gülcan
- Occupation: Television presenter
- Years active: 2002–present
- Spouse: Sebastian Kamps (m. 2007)

Gülcan Kamps (née Karahancı, born 20 September 1982) is a German television presenter of Turkish descent best known for being a VJ on German music channel VIVA.

== Career ==
After finishing her Abitur (A-level) in Lübeck, Kamps embarked on a career in management economics. During this time, she was chosen by VIVA from among a pool of 500 hopefuls in a VJ search. In 2004, teaming up with Mustafa Sandal, she got onto the European top 10 music charts with Aya Benzer. In 2004, she placed second in Maxim Magazine's women of the year in television. She also placed 60th in FHM Germany's 100 sexiest women and 71st for 2005.

Since 2004, Kamps has been involved in many charitable purposes such as with UNICEF for the "1 Viennese Tulip Ball". Since January 2005, she presented the interactive live show 17 together with Janin Reinhardt and Klaas Heufer-Umlauf. She also hosted the karaoke show Shibuya on VIVA.

In July 2007, she presented Live Earth.

She returned to TV in 2024, hosting the German version of the Acun Medya's fashion competition My Style Rocks on Sport1.

== Personal life ==
Gülcan was born and raised in Lübeck. Her parents are of Turkish descent. On 7 August 2007, Gülcan married Sebastian Kamps, the son of Heiner Kamps, the founder of the Kamps bakery chain.
