= Hakan Peker =

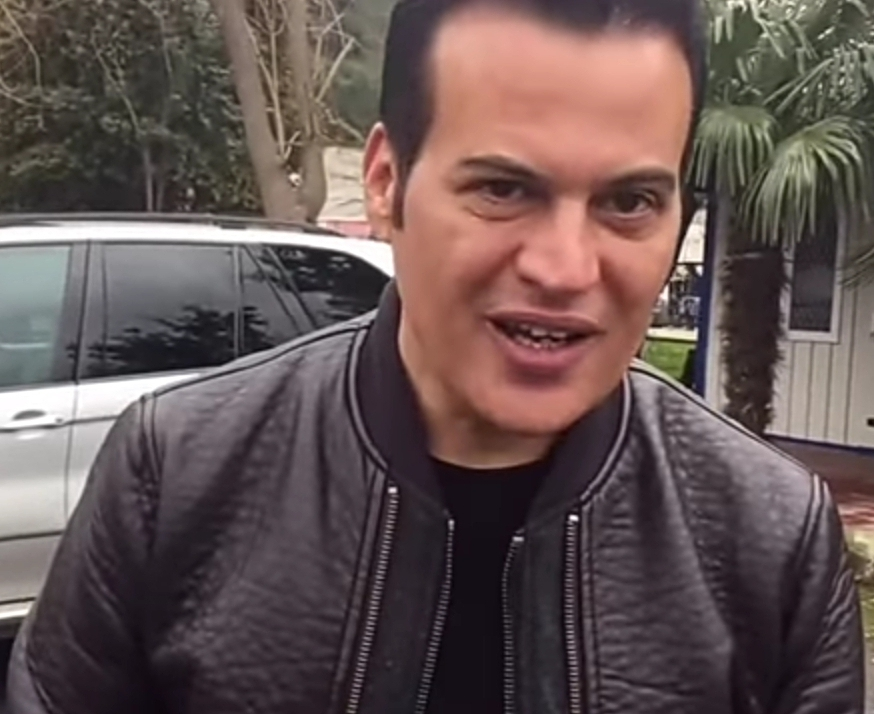

Background information
- Born: February 5, 1961 (age 65); Istanbul, Turkey
- Genres: Pop, electronic
- Occupations: Dancer, singer, song writer, music composer
- Years active: 1981–present
- Labels: Arma Müzik (1989–1990), Minerva Müzik (1990), Peker Müzik (1991–2008), Öztoprak Müzik (2011)

Hakan Peker (born February 5, 1961) is a Turkish dancer, songwriter, singer, and music composer.

== Discography ==
=== Released albums ===
- Bir Efsane (April 1989)
- Camdan Cama (March 1990)
- Düş ve Fantezi (September 1990)
- Hey Corç (Seni Unutmalı) (August 14, 1991)
- Amma Velakin (November 1993)
- Hakan Peker' (June 8, 1995)
- Salına Salına (July 1997)
- İlla ki (February 16, 2000)
- Canım İstedi (October 28, 2001)
- Aşk Bana Lazım (May 2003)
- Yak Beni (September 1, 2004)
- Gece Gözlüm (July 21, 2006)
- Hakan Peker 2011 (July 7, 2011)
- Mütemadiyen (May 2014)

=== Singles ===
- Taş Gibi (July 2004)
- Mütemadiyen (May 2014)
- Bir Yuva Kurmadık (June 2017)

=== Compilation albums ===
- Dünden Bugüne Hakan Peker (December 1998)
- Efsane Şarkılar (April 7, 2016)

== Music videos ==
| Year | Song | Album |
|---|---|---|
| 1991 | "Hey Corç" | Hey Corç (Seni Unutmalı) |
| 1991 | "Seni Unutmalı" | Hey Corç (Seni Unutmalı) |
| 1991 | "Kaldı Bende" | Hey Corç (Seni Unutmalı) |
| 1992 | "Hep Sen Varsın" | Hey Corç (Seni Unutmalı) |
| 1993 | "Amma Velakin" | Amma Velakin |
| 1993 | "Vazgeçen Ben Değildim" | Amma Velakin |
| 1994 | "Köylü Güzeli" | Amma Velakin |
| 1994 | "Sen Yok Desende" | Amma Velakin |
| 1994 | "Kritik" | Amma Velakin |
| 1994 | "Yağma Yok" | Amma Velakin |
| 1995 | "Ateşini Yolla Bana" | Hakan Peker |
| 1995 | "Uçuk Kaçık" | Hakan Peker |
| 1995 | "Aşkımız Göze mi Geldi?" | Hakan Peker |
| 1996 | "Günahlar" | Hakan Peker |
| 1996 | "Yalan Değil" | Hakan Peker |
| 1997 | "Salına Salına" | Salına Salına |
| 1997 | "Aldırma Sen Bana" | Salına Salına |
| 1998 | "Bir Efsane" | Dünden Bugüne Hakan Peker |
| 1999 | "Kolay Mı Unutmak" | Dünden Bugüne Hakan Peker |
| 1999 | "Vazgeçen Ben Değildim" | Dünden Bugüne Hakan Peker |
| 2000 | "İlla Ki" | İlla ki |
| 2000 | "Karam" | İlla ki |
| 2000 | "Unutmadım Seni" | İlla ki |
| 2000 | "Beni Aldatma" | İlla ki |
| 2001 | "Artık Sevmeyeceğim" | Canım İstedi |
| 2002 | "Kıskanırım Seni Ben" | Canım İstedi |
| 2002 | "Veda Busesi" | Canım İstedi |
| 2003 | "Aşk Bana Lazım" | Aşk Bana Lazım |
| 2003 | "Kelimeler Yetmez" | Aşk Bana Lazım |
| 2003 | "Alev Alev" | Aşk Bana Lazım |
| 2004 | "Taş Gibi" | Yak Beni |
| 2004 | "Yak Beni" | Yak Beni |
| 2004 | "Felsefe" | Yak Beni |
| 2005 | "Affetmedim Kendimi" | Yak Beni |
| 2006 | "Gece Gözlüm" | Gece Gözlüm |
| 2011 | "Karamela" | Hakan Peker 2011 |
| 2014 | "Mütemadiyen" | Mütemadiyen |
| 2016 | "Ateşini Yolla Bana" (feat. Feyyaz Kuruş & Tepki) | Efsane Şarkılar |
| 2016 | "Bir Efsane" | Efsane Şarkılar |
| 2016 | "Karam" | Efsane Şarkılar |
| 2017 | "Bir Yuva Kuramadık" | Bir Yuva Kuramadık |
