= Gülben Ergen =

Turkish singer, actress and former model

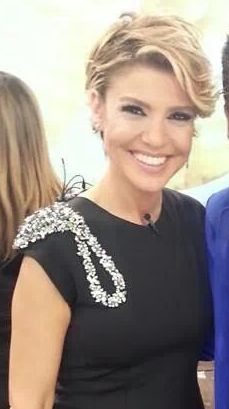
- Ergen in 2013
- Born: 25 August 1972 (age 54); Kadıköy, Istanbul, Turkey
- Education: Erenköy Girls High School; Kadıköy Business High School
- Occupations: Singer; songwriter; model (formerly); actress; TV presenter
- Years active: 1988–present
- Spouses: Mustafa Erdoğan (m. 2004; div. 2012) Erhan Çelik (m. 2014; div. 2016)
- Children: 3
- Musical career
- Genres: Pop; fantasy
- Labels: Elenor; EMI-Kent; Neşe; Universal; Seyhan; DMC
- Website: www.gulbenergen.com

Gülben Ergen (pronounced [ˈɟylbæn ˈæɾɟæn]; born 25 August 1972) is a Turkish singer, actress and former model.

Ergen started her career as an actress, and later decided to enter the music industry. She started her music career as a headliner. In 2001, for her role as Melek in the comedy series Dadı which is an adaptation of The Nanny, she won the award for Best Actress at the Golden Butterfly Awards. In 2002, the lead single from her album Sade ve Sadece was awarded the Best Composition of the Year at the Turkey Music Awards. In 2004 Ergen's album Uçacaksın sold 600,000 copies and received a diamond certification from Mü-Yap. In 2009, Ergen and Oğuzhan Koç released the song "Giden Günlerim Oldu" which became a number-one hit on Türkçe Top 20.

As of 2015, her albums have sold 2 million copies in total.

== Life and career ==
=== 1972–96: Early life and career beginnings ===
Gülben Ergen was born in Istanbul on 25 August 1972. After attending Erenköy Girls High School, she got enrolled at the Kadıköy Business High School and finished her studies there. At the age of 16, Ergen earned the second place in the Cinema Star Contest organized by Hürriyet, and after finishing high school she pursued a career in modeling.

Ergen made her cinematic debut in the 1988 movie Biz Ayrılamayız, which starred Bülent Ersoy. In the same year, she got a leading role in Kartal Tibet's movie Deniz Yıldızı alongside Kenan Kalav. She later appeared alongside Cüneyt Arkın in Av, and had a role in Kanun Savaşçıları together with Eşref Kolçak. Meanwhile, Ergen lost her eldest brother, who was five years older than her, in a car crash.

In 1994, she joined the staff of İbrahim Tatlıses at the Maksim Casino and later appeared in Tatlıses's music video "Haydi Söyle". Ergen, who started her music career during this period, was trained by Nurdan Torun's personnel. She was later cast in İbrahim Tatlıses's TV series Fırat.

=== 1997–2001: Merhaba, Marziye, Kör Aşık and Dadı ===
Gülben Ergen's first album Merhaba was released in September 1997 by Elenor Müzik. Separate music videos were made for the songs "Sana Sana", "Yaramaz", "Aşkta Kural Tanımam", "Boşvere Boşvere" and "Sensiz Mutlu Olamam".

In December 1999, her second studio album Kör Aşık was released. Şehrazat and Sezen Aksu were among the lyricists of this album. During this period, Ergen had her own program titled Gümbür Gümbür Gülbence aired on television, and in 1998–2001 she got the title role in the TV series Marziye.

In 2001, she acted in Show TV's series Dadı alongside Haldun Dormen and Kenan Işık. Her role on this series expanded her fan base. In 2001, she published the magazine Gülbence. In 2002, her third album Sade ve Sadece was released and in the same year she portrayed Hürrem Sultan in the TV series Hürrem Sultan.

=== 2002–06: Sade ve Sadece and Uçacaksın ===
Ergen's third studio album Sade ve Sadece was released in June 2002 by Neşe Müzik. The album's lead single was "Abayı Yaktım". The second song to get a music video was "Sadece (Elveda)", which became a number-one hit on MTV Turkey Top 5 Chart for two weeks. Other songs to have their own music videos were "Sandık Lekesi", "Arka Sokaklar" and "Teşekkür Ederim". During the same period Ergen continued with the new issues of the magazine Gülbence.

In February 2004, her fourth studio album, Uçacaksın, was released. To help with the album's marketing, she gave a concert in Istanbul and used its footage to make her live album Gülben Ergen Live in İstanbul. The album sold 600,000 copies by the end of the year and Ergen released music videos for the songs "Uçacaksın", "Kandıramazsın Beni", "Küt Küt", "Ayrılmam" and "Gencecik Delikanlı". In 2005, she released the single "Fıkır Fıkır", which was subsequently added to the track list of Uçacaksın and released under the title Fıkır Fıkır 9+1.

In September 2004, Ergen married Mustafa Erdoğan.

=== 2006–09: Gülben Ergen, Aşk Hiç Bitmez and Uzun Yol Şarkıları ===
The singer's new self-titled studio album, Gülben Ergen, was released in June 2006 by Seyhan Müzik. The album sold 180,000 copies in the year that it came out and its songs "Yalnızlık", "Lay La Lay Lalay", "Yani" and "Aşksın Sen" got their own music videos. For this album, Ergen collaborated with Sezen Aksu, Şehrazat, Yıldız Tilbe, Yalın and Nazan Öncel. In the same year she was cast in Kanal D's series Gönül. She gave birth to her first child Atlas in January 2007.

In March 2008, her sixth studio album, Aşk Hiç Bitmez, was released by Seyhan Müzik. The songs "Sürpriz", "Avrupa", "Bay Doğru" and "Ya Ölümsün Ya Düğün" were chosen to be made into music videos; out of these songs, "Avrupa" was picked as a promotional single for the Turkey national football team who were participating in the UEFA Euro 2008. The song was recomposed and Ege Çubukçu was featured on the revised version. In May, Ergen's new program, Gülben Ergen'le Sürpriz, began to air on atv. During that period she also released the book Gülben'den Masallar in aid of the Education Volunteers Foundation of Turkey.

Ergen's seventh album, Uzun Yol Şarkıları, was produced by Seyhan Müzik and released in April 2009. Unlike her other albums, this album was recorded entirely live, and no computer program was used in preparing the songs. The album's lead single, "Giden Günlerim Oldu", ranked number-one on Turkey's official music charts. The song became the best-selling song on the digital platforms in Turkey in 2009. In June 2009, Ergen gave birth to twins Ares and Güney.

=== 2011–13: Şıkır Şıkır, Hayat Bi' Gün, and Sen ===
In 2011, Ergen released the single "Şıkır Şıkır". For this song she collaborated with Mustafa Sandal. Artist and photographer Nihat Odabaşı directed the song's music video. Taşkın Sabah acted as the music director, while Tarık Ceran did the single's mixing and mastering. Ergen performed the song "Şıkır Şıkır" on 27 July at her concert in Kuruçeşme Arena in Istanbul. The song's music video was viewed 150,000 times on YouTube within 3 days of its release. It ranked number-one on Turkey's official music charts and became Ergen's second number-one hit.

Ergen and Mustafa Erdoğan's marriage ended in divorce in April 2012.

After her concert in Kuruçeşme Arena, she finished the preparations for her new album, Hayat Bi' Gün, and it was released in August. Taşkın Sabah served as the music director, while Fettah Can, Ersay Üner, Eflatun, Serdar Ortaç, and Mustafa Sandal wrote most of the songs; Tarık Ceran did the mixing and mastering. The first music video for this album was made for the song "Yarı Çıplak", which was written by Serdar Ortaç. The second music video was made for "Tesadüf", which was written and composed by Ersay Üner; the song became one of the popular slow-paced songs in 2011. Ergen's music style underwent a big change in 2012 and she made a video music for the high-tempo song "Vıdı Vıdı", which was written and composed by Eflatun. Ergen's work on this music video was praised by the music critics.

In summer 2012, Ergen revealed in a report that she was working on her new album and had taken songs from Metin Arolat and Kenan Doğulu, which she had set aside for the future. Out of these songs, Ergen recorded "Durdurun Dünyayı" by Kenan Doğulu and released it in August 2012. The single was released with two different arrangements by Ozan Doğulu and Taşkın Sabah. On 24 August 2012, she performed at the Turkcell Kuruçeşme Arena for the fourth time.

In June 2013, Ergen released her first EP album Sen. Its lead single, also titled "Sen", was written by Mert Ekren. The song ranked second on Turkey's official music charts. In September, Ergen returned to the television with her new program Gülben on Show TV.

=== 2014–present: Aşkla Aynı Değil and Kalbimi Koydum ===
On 27 September 2014, Ergen married anchorman Erhan Çelik. Their close friends attended the marriage ceremony. Taşkın Sabah and chairman of the board of directors of Ciner Holding, Kenan Tekdağ, were the witnesses of the marriage. The mayor of Selçuk municipality, Dr. Dahi Zeynel Bakıcı, officiated at the wedding. The venue for the marriage was one of the old mansions of the mountain village of Şirince. Fresh spike and fresh lavender were used in designing the area for the wedding ceremony. In December, Ergen was among the artists featured on the album Kayahan En İyileri No.1 in tribute to Kayahan. She recorded the song "Devamı Var" for this album.

In April 2015 and before the release of her new album, Ergen released the single "Aşkla Aynı Değil". The song was written and composed by Oğuzhan Koç. Back in 2009, the two had another collaboration on the song "Giden Günlerim Oldu". With more than 130 million views on YouTube, "Aşkla Aynı Değil" is Ergen's most viewed music video on the platform. In August, she joined TV 8's singing competition Rising Star Türkiye as a judge, together with Demet Akalın, Mustafa Sandal and Fuat Güner. The program is one of the world's first interactive voice contests, with a special application designed for smartphones and tablets, enabling the audiences and judges to vote instantly.

Two years after their marriage, Ergen and Erhan Çelik divorced on 6 December 2016.

After four years, Ergen released her tenth studio album, Kalbimi Koydum, on 19 October. The album topped the pre-order section and became the most popular album on iTunes in Turkey. The album's lead single, also titled "Kalbimi Koydum", was written and composed by Bora Duran. The song ranked second on Turkey's official music charts. The second music video for this album was released for the song, "Yıkıl Karşımdan", which was written and composed by Mustafa Sandal and Emina Jahović. On 28 March 2016, the third music video was released for the song "Kusura Bakma", written by Mert Ekren. The fourth music video for this album was made for the song "Özledim" and was shown to the public at Ergen's concert at the Bostancı Show Center. "Yaklaş Yaklaş" was the fifth song from this album to get a music video, which was released on 1 August 2016, followed by a music video for the song "Panda" on 26 September 2016.

In 2017, Gülben Ergen sued Seren Serengil due to the comments she had made about Ergen's private life on Star TV's program Duymayan Kalmasın, and in October 2017 a court in Istanbul ruled that Serengil "could not come closer than 30 meters to Ergen, could not insult her or commit any kind of violence against her" for six months. The court eventually sentenced Serengil to a three-day imprisonment in January 2018.

Since 2017, Ergen has continued her career by releasing the singles "Esasen" (2017), written by Soner Sarıkabadayı, "Yansın Bakalım" (2017), "İnfilak" (2018) and "Bu Benim Hayatım" (2020), written by Sezen Aksu, and "Müsaadenle" (2019), written by Onur Mete and Zuhal Karadeniz.

== Other ventures ==
=== Çocuklar Gülsün Diye ===
Çocuklar Gülsün Diye Association was founded in 2010 by Gülben Ergen as the continuation of the campaign Çocuklar Gülsün Diye. Under Gülben Ergen's presidency, and with Elvan Oktar as vice president, the association aims to contribute to the dissemination of pre-school education in Turkey.

A total of 27 kindergartens have been completed and started working under the Ministry of National Education. They have been furnished and provided with all the necessary materials for a contemporary education.

=== Sürpriz ===
Sürpriz was the title of Gülben Ergen's program which aired on atv. Its first episode aired on 14 May 2008 and numerous celebrities and artists were featured on it. As the program started two months after the release of Aşk Hiç Bitmez, it allowed Ergen to promote her new album as well. With the appearance of İbrahim Tatlıses in its second week and his ballet performance in the studio, the program achieved a great audience.

=== Gülbence ===
Gülbence is the title of both Gülben Ergen's magazine and her morning program. Ergen used this name due to its similarity to her own first name. The name Gülbence later became strongly associated with Ergen. Gülbence was a women's magazine published weekly. As Hülya Avşar's Hülya magazine was being published at the same time, it created the so-called Gülben-Hülya conflict. Ergen's morning program Gülbence aired on TGRT from 1998 to 2001. The program contributed to the sales of her album Kör Aşık and boosted the rating for her TV series Marziye, and was again aired in 2006 until Ergen's first pregnancy forced her to withdraw from the program. In 2008, however, she returned to television with her news program Sürpriz.

=== Gülben'den Masallar ===
"Gülben'den Masallar" is the name of Ergen's first book, which contains seven different stories. They are primarily about issues such as environmental awareness, brotherly love, friendship, respect for the elderly, nature and animal love, and healthy nutrition. Ergen donated the money from the book's sales to the Turkish Education Volunteers Foundation. It was published by Kelime Yayınları, with Ebru Diril serving as the illustrator. Eda Demirbay helped Ergen with writing the book.

=== Gülben ===
In 2011, Ergen prepared a new TV program, titled Gülben, which aired on TRT daily. In 2013, she continued to present the program on Show TV with the same name. The content of the program was subjects related to life, and especially women. Health, diet, beauty, fashion, decoration, personal development, as well as issues that are closely related to women were the major topics of the program and special guests would be featured on the episodes from time to time.

== Discography ==
- Merhaba (1997)
- Kör Aşık (1999)
- Sade ve Sadece (2002)
- Uçacaksın (2004)
- Gülben Ergen Live in İstanbul (2005)
- 9+1 Fıkır Fıkır (2005)
- Gülben Ergen (2006)
- Aşk Hiç Bitmez (2008)
- Uzun Yol Şarkıları (2009)
- Hayat Bi' Gün (2011)
- Kalbimi Koydum (2015)
- Seni Kırmışlar (2020)

== Filmography ==
=== Film ===
Year	Tite	Notes, role
1988	Biz Ayrılamayız	Mine
1988	Deniz Yıldızı	
1989	Av	
1992	İşgal Altında	
2017	Vezir Parmağı	Gülbahar

=== TV series ===
Year	Tite	Notes, role
1990	Hanımın Çiftliği	
1991	Kanun Savaşçıları	
1994	İki Kız Kardeş	
1997	Fırat	
1998	Marziye	Marziye
2001	Dadı	Melek
2002	Hürrem Sultan	Hürrem Sultan
2006	Gönül	Gönül
2021	Menajerimi Ara	guest

=== Programme ===
Year	Tite	Notes
1998	Gümbür Gümbür Gülbence	talk show, presenter
2008	Gülben Ergen'le Sürpriz	talk show, presenter
2009	Popstar Alaturka	competition, judge
2011	Gülben	program, presenter
2012	Benzemez Kimse Sana	2 episodes
2013	Gülben	program, presenter
2013	Bir Milyon Kimin?	competition, judge
2015	Rising Star Türkiye	competition, judge
2020	Benimle Söyle	competition, guest judge
2020	Uzak Ara Eğlence	judge
