= İzel (singer) =

Turkish pop singer (born 1969)

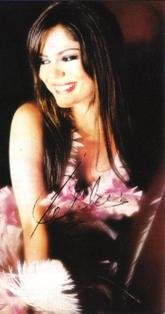
- İzel in 2009

Background information
- Also known as: İzel
- Born: İzel Çeliköz; 29 April 1969 (age 57); Yalova, Turkey
- Genres: Pop
- Occupation: Singer
- Years active: 1987–present

İzel Çeliköz (born 29 April 1969) is a Turkish pop singer. She was originally part of the Turkish pop trio İzel-Çelik-Ercan, but after the group broke up in 1993, she decided to release solo albums. She is one of the most successful Turkish singers of the 1990s and 2000s.

== Career ==
İzel Çeliköz was born in Yalova. In 1991 İzel represented Turkey at the Eurovision Song Contest. Performing alongside Reyhan Karaca and Can Uğurluer with the song "İki Dakika", the trio finished 12th of 22 participants. After deciding to start releasing solo albums, İzel released her solo debut album titled Adak. In 1997, İzel released her second solo album titled Emanet which featured Mustafa Sandal on the opening track as well as listing him as a producer. She originally wanted the album to be produced by Ercan Saatçi and Aykut Gürel, but could not convince them to work together. In 1999, İzel released her third album Bir Küçük Aşk. In this album, she worked with young composer Altan Çetin. All of the songs were written by Altan Çetin. The album closely sold 500.000 copies and created a successful career for her. In 2001, her fourth album Bebek was released. It was the second time that she was working with Altan Çetin. All of the songs were written by Altan Çetin. For the album, İzel tried arabesque music in some songs. In 2003, İzel released her fifth album Şak. In 2005, İzel released her sixth album Bir Dilek Tut Benim İçin. While she was working for Emel Müftüoğlu's album, she met Sezen Aksu and her present arranger Sinan Akçıl. She vocalized three Sezen Aksu songs in her own album. Also, Sinan Akçıl produced the album. In 2007, her seventh album Işıklı Yol was released. Sinan Akçıl produced the album. Now, İzel is working on her new album.

Up to now, her all albums have sold more than 2 million copies.

== Personal life ==
In December 2008, she had an operation for her acne. She has had a prolonged bout of acne, which she recently explained was a physiological response to her learning about being deceived by her partner.

In April 2009, she had a second operation and said that she would "have a skin like a baby's".

== Discography ==
=== Solo albums ===
- Adak (Sacrifice) (1995)
- Emanet (On Hold) (1997)
- Bir Küçük Aşk (A Small Love) (1999)
- Bebek (Baby) (2001)
- Şak (Shock) (2003)
- Bir Dilek Tut Benim İçin (Make A Wish For Me) (2005)
- Işıklı Yol (Road With Lights) (2007)
- Jazz Nağme (2010)
- Aşk En Büyüktür Her Zaman (2012)
- Kendiliğinden Olmalı (2019)

=== Albums with Grup Vitamin ===
- Bol Vitamin (1990)

=== Albums with İzel-Çelik-Ercan ===
- Özledim (I Missed) (1991)

=== Albums with İzel-Ercan ===
- İşte Yeniden (1992)

== See also ==
- List of Turkish pop music performers
- Music of Turkey
- Turkish pop music

Awards and achievements
Preceded by Kayahan with "Gözlerinin Hapsindeyim"	Turkey in the Eurovision Song Contest; 1991	Succeeded by Aylin Vatankoş with "Yaz Bitti"
