= Mustafa Sandal =

Turkish singer-songwriter (born 1970)

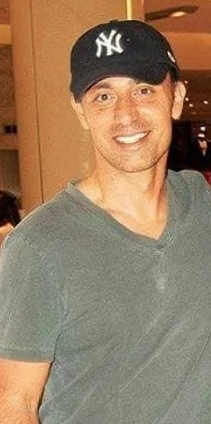
- Sandal in 2010
- Born: 11 January 1970 (age 56); Istanbul, Turkey
- Occupations: Singer-songwriter; producer; performance artist; businessman; actor
- Spouses: Emina Jahović (m. 2008; div. 2018) Melis Sütşurup (m. 2022)
- Children: 2
- Musical career
- Genres: Dance; folk; pop; techno; world
- Years active: 1991–present
- Labels: Şahin Özer; Yada; Prestij; Sony; Erol Köse; Universal; Seyhan; Poll; DMC

Mustafa Sandal (born 11 January 1970) is a Turkish singer-songwriter and actor. At the beginning of the 1990s, he wrote and composed a number of songs for other singers and made a reputation for himself in the music industry. He had the leading role in comedy series "Başrolde Aşk".

In 1994, with the release of his first studio album Suç Bende and its subsequent success, he made a name for himself in Turkey. This was followed by the release of another album titled Gölgede Aynı in 1996. In 1998, the song "Aya Benzer" from his new album Detay became a number-one hit in Turkey. After signing a contract with Sony Music, he released the album Araba. The song "Araba" from the album became a massive hit. Throughout his career he continued to release many albums, including Akışına Bırak (2000), Kop (2002). Later, under the label Universal Music-Polydor, he released the album Seven (2003), followed by İste (2004), Devamı Var (2007), and Karizma (2009). In 2011, his single with Gülben Ergen, "Şıkır Şıkır", became the most downloaded song of the year. In 2012, Sandal released his 10th studio album Organik. In 2013, his new single "Tesir Altında" became one of the best-selling singles of 2013. Sandal has won many awards throughout his career. For his album Kop, he was voted the "Best Male Artist" in 2002.

In addition to his work in the field of music, television, advertising, cinema and other important achievements, Sandal has sold more than 14 million albums worldwide and has collaborated with many artists, including Ajda Pekkan, Sezen Aksu and Hakan Peker.

== Personal life and education ==
Mustafa Sandal was born in Istanbul. His father Yusuf Sandal was from Erzincan, while his mother Tülin İleri was from Adana. The family lived in Arnavutköy, Istanbul. His maternal grandfather was musician Hüseyin İleri who worked for TRT.

Mustafa Sandal had his primary education in Tarabya at Özel Dost School. He later moved to Geneva and got enrolled in Collège du Léman. After 8 years of studying, he went to the United States and started studying at the New Hampshire University. In 1996, he continued his studies at the American College of London. He learned English, Italian and French. He also served in the military for 28 days in 1999 in Malatya. Sandal, known for his passion for flying, is a certified pilot.

Sandal was married on 13 January 2008 in Hôtel Les Ottomans à Istanbul to the famous Serbian singer Emina Jahović whom he met in July 2004 in Bodrum, Muğla. The couple's first child, Yaman, was born by Caesarean section in Istanbul on 8 August 2008. On 26 July 2011, the Sandals announced that they were expecting their second child in the winter. On 21 February 2012, Emina Sandal gave birth at the American Hospital to a baby boy, Yavuz. The couple's children speak both Turkish and Serbian. The couple divorced in 2018, citing irreconcilable differences.

Sandal married Melis Sütşurup on 3 June 2022 at the Turkish embassy in Rome, Italy.

Sandal is known supporter of Beşiktaş JK. He performed has performed at the club's stadium during several major official events and championship celebration ceremonies.

== Music career ==
=== 1989–1993: Composing and songwriting ===
In 1989, his passion for music led him to leave the United States after two-and-a-half years and he returned to Turkey. His professional journey in music began at Istanbul Gelişim Studio, owned by Garo Mafyan. It was there that he unveiled a talent for composing and songwriting.

He wrote and composed his first song "Vazgeçme" together with Bülent Tezcan and the song was given to singer Ajda Pekkan who released it in 1991. Ajda Pekkan, Sezen Aksu, Zerrin Özer, Muazzez Abacı, Ayşegül Aldinç, Yonca Evcimik, Ozan Orhon, Burak Kut, Deniz Arcak, Emel Müftüoğlu, İzel, Reyhan Karaca, Sibel Alaş, Asya, Hakan Peker, Sertab Erener, Ferda Anıl Yarkın and Mert Ekren are among the artists for whom Sandal has written and composed songs. For a while he worked for the music legend Onno Tunç as an assistant.

=== 1994–1999: Suç Bende, Gölgede Aynı, Detay ===
In July 1994, his first studio album Suç Bende was released. The 7 songs on this album were written and composed by Sandal himself and within 3 months, he gave 140 concerts in Turkey and 30 concerts outside the country.

After the success of the first album, in June 1996 Sandal released his second album Gölgede Aynı, which was again entirely composed and written by himself. This album solidified his place in the music market. Following the release of this album, he performed at more than 140 events in Turkey. The first music video for this album was released for the song "Araba" and it was recorded in Beşiktaş. Zeki Demirkubuz appeared on his second music video for the song "Jest Oldu". He also recorded an action video clip for the song "Bir Anda". In 1996, Gölgede Aynı became the best-selling album in Turkey with more than 3,600,000 sales.

On 1 September 1998, his third studio album Detay was released by Prestij Müzik. The success of this album enabled Sandal to give more than 120 concerts across the country, and this album also had a good performance on the sales charts.

In May 1999, under a new contract with Sony Music in France, he recorded a new music video for the rearranged version of his song "Araba" in Marrakesh, Morocco. The song was translated into Russian, Arabic and Greek. After the release of this new single, the album Araba was sold in a number of countries outside Turkey. Due to some problems with Sony Music, Sandal decided to finish his career in Europe.

=== 2000–2003: Akışına Bırak, Kop and Aşka Yürek Gerek ===
In June 2000, his fourth studio album Akışına Bırak was released by Prestij Müzik. İskender Paydaş served as the music director for this album. The song "Tek Geçerim" on this album topped the music charts and Sandal recorded and released a music video for it. Another music video was made for the song "Hatırla Beni", a duet with the Greek singer Natalia. The third and final music video was released for the song "Geriye Dönemem". In 2000, his song "Gidesim Gelmiyor", featuring Reyhan Karaca, became one of the best songs in Turkey. In June 2001, he composed the song "Can Cana" for the Istanbul Metro Service. He later performed with the Italian singer Eros Ramazzotti at the Ali Sami Yen Stadium in front of 25,000 people. He later confessed that among his performances with other stars, the one with Ramazzotti was the most memorable one.

In May 2002, Sandal's new album Kop was released by Erol Köse Production and became the second best-selling album of the year. The release of the album in 2002 was conjoined with the 2002 FIFA World Cup' and with the presence of Turkish national football team in the competition, the song "Pazara Kadar" from this album, which was written for the national team was well received by fans. Sandal later developed his own production company, called Yada Prodüksiyon. After the release of Kop, Sandal gave a number of concerts in Europe, including one in Moscow and another in Olympia, Paris, in 2003.

His first maxi single Maxi Sandal 2003 was released in Turkey in 2003. The first music video for this maxi single was made for the song "Aşka Yürek Gerek" and Sandal again appeared with the Greek singer Natalia on the video clip. His new single, "Aya Benzer 2003 (Moonlight)", was released by Universal Music. Sandal eventually released his new album Seven. The album ranked among the top 10 on the sales charts in Europe. Sandal played in the music video for "All My Life" with Miss World 2002 Azra Akın The video was recorded at the Topkapı Palace. Following the success of Seven, German talk show host Stefan Raab came with his team to Turkey to record an exclusive program about Sandal in Karaköy. He also appeared on the cover of Der Spiegel magazine. For the 100th anniversary of the foundation of Beşiktaş football team, Sandal composed the songs "100. Yıl Marşı" and "Hadi Hisset".

=== 2004–2007: Success in Europe ===
On 13 July 2004, Sandal released another maxi single titled İste. The first music video from this work was released for the song "İsyankar". Later, another music video for the Oriental Remix version of the song was recorded, using the footage of one of Sandal's concerts. Another music video was released for the song "Kavrulduk". Sandal faced his fans in summer at his concerts under the theme "Volkswagen with Music Love". He even appeared at some of his concerts with his Volkswagen cars. In the same year, under a contract with LR Cosmetics, Sandal produced a series of perfumes called "7" in 24 different countries.

In 2005, he released "İsyankar" as a single under the label Universal Music. "İsyankar" became one of the best-selling songs in Germany, Austria and Switzerland. In 2005, in honor of Turkey's team who were competing at the UEFA Champions League, Sandal gave a concert at Taksim Square in Istanbul, during which Mayor Kadir Topbaş also made an appearance. He later shared the same stage with Shakira at Aspendos Theater on the ZDF program Wetten Dass?. Following the concert, Shakira said: "Mustafa Sandal is a very good friend and a nice pal. It's more than enough to have friends like him." Sandal also met Paris Hilton at the backstage of the program. On 7 May 2005, he initiated Musti TV on his official website. In August, his new maxi single, "Yamalı Tövbeler", was released. On the day it was released, "Yamalı Tövbeler" sold 180,000 copies, which was a record in Turkey.

Sandal's single "İsyankar" sold 150,000 copies in Germany, which earned him a gold certification. The video clip for "İsyankar" was shot in Istanbul, near Bosphorus, and produced by Universal Music. The video ranked first on the MTV TRL Charts list, leaving behind Blue and Avril Lavigne. After this success, Sandal started his world tour on 5 February in Germany and performed in England, Pakistan, Russia, the Netherlands, Albania and Brazil.

=== 2007–2012: Devamı Var, Karizma and Organik ===
On 12 June 2007, Sandal announced his new album Devamı Var, and it was released a day later on 13 June. The album's lead single "İndir" was written and composed by Sinan Akçıl. The likes of İskender Paydaş, Özgür Yedievli, Sinan Akçıl, Erhan Bayrak and Tolga Kılıç worked on the album for one year, about which Sandal said: "For this reason I can call it the 'album of my life'. My songs will dominate the market in summer. We worked at the studio for a year. I missed doing concerts and being with my fans." Sandal also appeared with his grandfather Hüseyin İleri on the Muhabbet Card commercials.

In 2008, Sandal started a tour of concerts in Turkey under the sponsorship of Muhabbet Cart. He finished the tour in Muğla by performing in front of 10,000 people. In his concerts in 15 different cities, he performed for a total number of 500,000 people. His songs "İndir", "Aşka Yürek Gerek" and "İsyankar" appeared on a video game (SingStar Turkish Party) for PlayStation 2. The company officials said that they were thinking about including a Turkish pop star in their game console, and chose Sandal due to his popularity in Europe. Sandal received an award for the 2008 Best Commercial Film for his appearance on a mobile phone commercial. The singer, who had 200,000 fans on his website, ranked third in terms of popularity after Madonna and Britney Spears in Europe in 2008.

In June 2009, Sandal released his new album Karizma. About the album he said: "My first album as a father is considered to be a milestone for me". He worked on this album with Bojan Dugic who had arranged songs for Britney Spears, Jennifer Lopez and Sting in the past. Bojan Dugic composed the album's lead single "Ateş Et ve Unut" and the song "Karizma". As Dugic decided to give a song he had previously prepared for Jennifer Lopez to Sandal, the release of the album was delayed for two weeks. The album was downloaded 450,000 times from internet websites in 4 days and Sandal ensured that these sites and pirate sellers were identified by a team of 300 people selected from his fan club members. 50,000 dollars was spent on the music video for "Ateş Et ve Unut", which was recorded at Haydarpaşa Port.

The United Nations Children's Fund and UNICEF Germany Committee selected Mustafa Sandal as a European spokesperson for the aid campaign for refugee children in Pakistan. In a poll conducted among Pakistani children and in another one in European countries among a total of 50 thousand people, Sandal was voted the most popular Turkish artist in Europe, which urged him give a message about peace in the world in the UNICEF brochure published in Ramadan 2009. Sandal later said about the offer: "I accepted it without thinking, and we will meet children in our Eastern and Southeastern Anatolian tour." Sandal's English, German and French fans, reacted positively to the song "Ateş Et ve Unut" on internet and some said about Sandal's charity work: "Turkey's Michael Jackson has become a goodwill ambassador for our children."

In 2010, Mustafa Sandal and Gökben made a duet called "Nevrin Döner" in the album Dev Devleri, which brings together Nostalgic and new generation artists.

In June 2011, Mustafa Sandal and Gülben Ergen released the duet "Şıkır Şıkır". The song is written by Sandal and composed by the Egyptian artist Amr Mostafa; It was downloaded 133,253 times and became 2011's best-selling song on the digital platform in Turkey.

In summer of 2012, Sandal released the album Organik and described it as the "album of my life". The songs were first listened to by fans at his concert, which was aired on Turkcellmuzik.com. The album's lead single "Ego" ranked number-one on Top 100 in digital platforms. The album was also discussed in the social media in particular and Sandal expressed his excitement by publishing a video with Mahsun Kırmızıgül through his YouTube channel. The album's first music video was recorded for the song "Ego". Tülay İbak directed the music video, in which 20 actors and members of his team appeared. Sandal said about the music video: "It's not a clip, but a short film, I wanted to get away from similar things and show people something different." It was also the fastest-rising work of the 24th week on Nielsen Music Turkey list. Sandal's wife Emina was featured on the song "Çek Gönder". Soner Sarıkabadayı and Eflatun were among the artists featured in this album. Sandal's concert in Beykoz, Istanbul, was attended by 150,000 which was a record at the time. Sandal was among the artists featured on the album Tam 90'dan in tribute to Volga Tamöz and voiced the song "Kalmadı" for it. Together with Turkey National Olympic Committee (TMOK), Sandal became an ambassador for School Olympic Games Project to promote sport for youth and their families and composed the song "Teşekkürler Anne" for the project's campaign.

=== 2013–present: Singles ===
In 2013, he started working on a new single for which he collaborated with Gülşen and Ozan Çolakoğlu. Due to some certain events in Turkey at the time, Sandal decided to postpone the project and on 6 August 2013 he released the single "Tesir Altında", which became the best-selling single of 2013. In the following years, Sandal continued his career by releasing a number of singles, including "Reset" (feat. Eypio) (2018), "Gel Bana" (2019) and Mod (feat. Zeynep Bastık) (2019), all of which entered the official music chart in Turkey.

On 27 September 2017 Mustafa Sandal performed at the 2017 Asian Indoor and Martial Arts Games closing ceremony held at the Olympic Stadium in Ashgabat, Turkmenistan with song in Turkmen language Kushtdepdi.

At the 2019 ABU TV Song Festival organized by the Asia-Pacific Broadcasting Union and held in Tokyo, Sandal represented Turkey – one of the eleven participating countries – and performed a new version of his song "Aya Benzer".

In April 2020, he released a single titled "Yanında" in tribute to the healthcare workers during their fight against the COVID-19 pandemic. Singers Melis Fis and Defkhan appeared as the featured artists in this song, the digital revenues from which were donated to healthcare facilities. The song was recorded using the new technology of 8D music. In September 2020, he released the single "Damar", which topped the music charts in Turkey.

In the 2021 New Year's special program on Kazakhstan's Astana TV, Sandal performed a Kazakh-Turkish version of his song "Mod" as a duet with Kazakh singer Indira Elemes. He also had a solo performance on stage with his songs "Araba" and "İsyankar". In January 2021, Sandal and Doğu Demirkol released their duet "Tekrar". The song was accompanied by a music video as well as a short film, throughout which references were made to Sandal's previous music videos.

In July 2023, he released a single titled "Tamam Tamam", composed by Harun Sürek.

In July 2024, to mark the 30th anniversary of her debut album Suç Bende, he recorded a duet with Belarusian singer Olga Napoli for the single version of the track "Sana İhtiyacım Var 2024", which featured on the album. In August of the same year, Sandal released the single "İhtimal", with lyrics by Derya Uluğ.

In July 2025, he released the single Aşkına Destan. In October of the same year, the Arts Council England granted international artist status to a Turkish singer for the first time and awarded Sandal a lifetime Global Artist Visa. A residence permit was also issued for Sandal.

In April 2026, at the "Saygı1 Mustafa Sandal Concert" organised by Oğuzhan Uğur, 30 artists performed 30 songs composed and sung by Mustafa Sandal. In May of the same year, the "Mustafa Sandal Saygı1" album, comprising these songs, was released on all digital platforms.

== Cinema and TV career ==
In 1993, Sandal presented a radio program titled Kırmızı Işık on Power FM with Hakan Akay. In 1995, Sandal was cast in a supporting role in the movie Bay E and performed the movie's main song.

In November 2010, the movie New York'ta Beş Minare became the most-viewed film in Turkey, in which Sandal portrayed an anti-terrorism police named Acar. In the same year, Sandal worked as a presenter on Star TV's program Kimsin Sen.

In 2011, Sandal played opposite Dolunay Soysert in TRT 1's TV series Başrolde Aşk.

In 2012, he joined Acun Ilıcalı's program O Ses Türkiye (The Voice) on Star TV as a judge, together with Hülya Avşar, Hadise and Murat Boz. The program was well received by fans and İbrahim Şevki from Sandal's team was voted runner-up at the first season. In 2013, Mustafa Bozkurt from Sandal's team won the competition and became the winner. As his main goal was to win the competition once, he left the program after the second season.

Sandal also continued to appear in commercials and together with his then-wife Emina Jahović, he received 1,250,000 dollars for a Turkcell commercial. He then appeared in 3 commercials for BP as the face of their brand, which earned him 1,830,000 dollars. For the first commercial Sandal told a story about one of his interactions with a fan who was a BP user, and for the other commercial he went in front of the camera with scenarist Gülse Birsel.

The Disney movie Planes was released in Turkey on 23 August 2013, in which Sandal voiced the Turkish version of the character Dusty.

In 2014, Sandal was a guest on the New Year episode of Kanal D's program Arkadaşım Hoşgeldin and appeared in a sketch titled "Romada Aşk" with Tolga Çevik and Ezgi Mola and performed his song "Tesir Altında".

Sandal appeared in both seasons of the competition show Rising Star Türkiye, hosted by Öykü Serter and broadcast on TV8 between 2015 and 2016; in the first season, he served as a judge alongside Gülben Ergen, Demet Akalın and Fuat Güner, whilst in the second season he was on the judging panel with Yılmaz Morgül, İrem Derici and Emina Jahović.

In 2018, he played the role of Mıstık, a local resident, in Cem Yılmaz's film Arif V 216.

== Other activities ==
In 2019, Sandal joined Turkey's team on the National Sports Synchronized Skiing World Championships. After 17 years the championships was re-established by the Turkish Ski Federation and held in Aspen, Colorado, between 11 and 13 April 2019 in three different disciplines. Sandal, together with Cem Hakko, Doruk Kaya, Dr. Fatih Kıyıcı, Atakan Alaftargil, Arif Alaftargil, Metin Polat, Tunç Taşdemir and Çetin Şirvani formed the Turkish Synchronized Ski National Team which came in 2nd and 3rd place in parallel slalom races held on the first day of the competition and 8th in dished landing. In synchronous landings on the second day, it was 4th in the forced synchronous landing.

== Discography ==
- Suç Bende (1994)
- Gölgede Aynı (1996)
- Detay (Detail) (1998)
- Akışına Bırak (2000)
- Kop (Break) (2002)
- Seven (Lover) (2003)
- İste (Ask for It) (2004)
- Yamalı Tövbeler (2005)
- Devamı Var (2007)
- Karizma (2009)
- Organik (Organic) (2012)

== Filmography ==
- Mr. E (Turkish: Bay E) (1995)
- Interaktiv (2003)
- TV total (2004)
- Wetten, dass..? (2005)
- Five Minarets in New York (Turkish: New York'ta Beş Minare) (2010)
- Başrolde Aşk (2011)
- Arkadaşım Hoşgeldin (2014)
- Arif V 216 (2018)

== Programs ==
- Kimsin Sen (Turkish version of Identity) (2010)
- O Ses Türkiye (Turkish version of The Voice) (2011–2013)
- Rising Star Türkiye (2015)

== Books ==
- Sandal, Mustafa (2020). Beni Ağlatma (in Turkish). Doğan Kitap. ISBN 9786050969115. (autobiography)
