= Reynmen =

Turkish Internet Personality

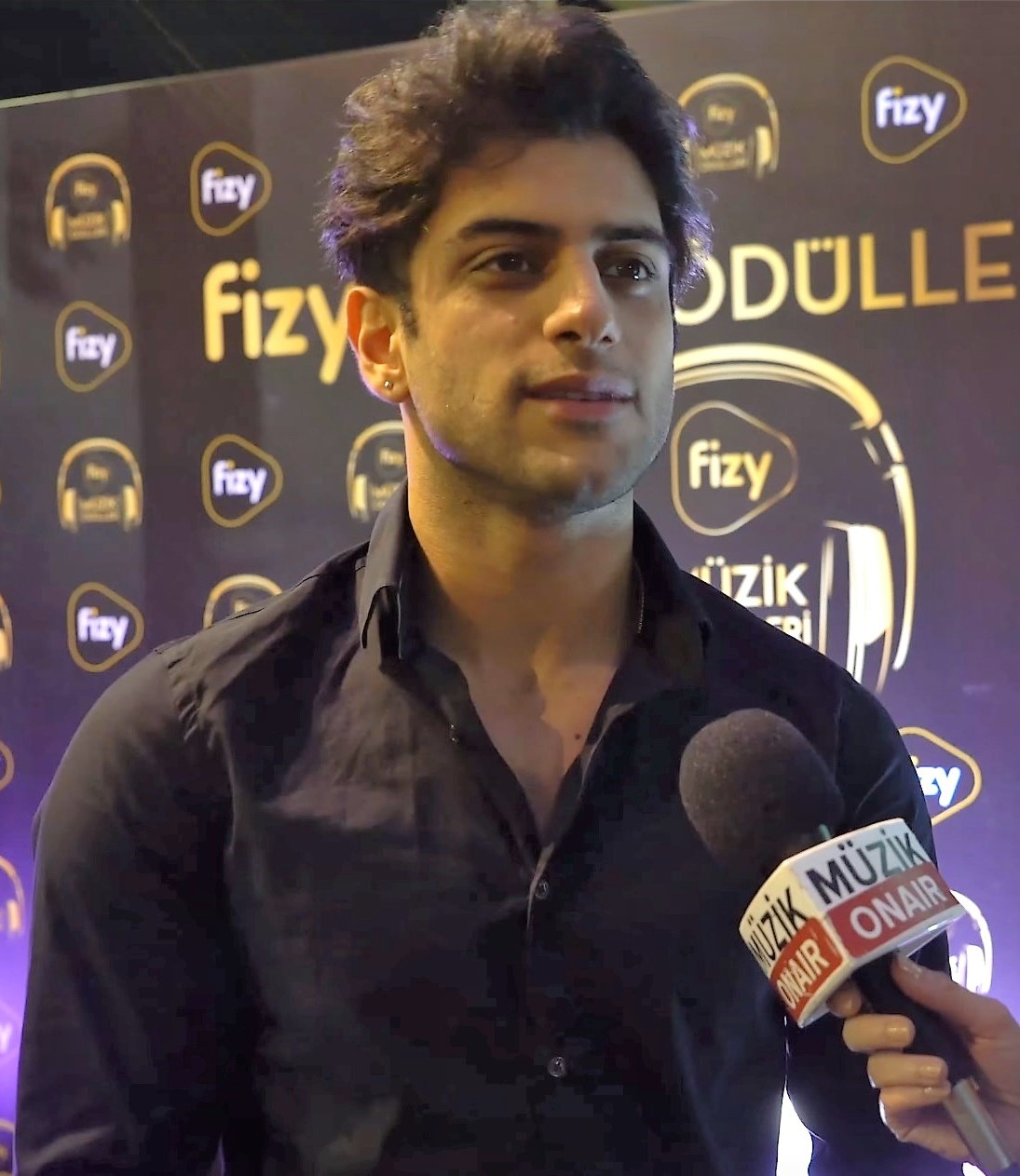
- Reynmen in 2019
- Born: Yusuf Aktaş; 6 December 1995 (age 30); Istanbul, Turkey
- Occupations: YouTuber, singer
- Years active: 2016–present
- Spouse: Emire Cansu Kurtaran (m. 2024)

Yusuf Aktaş (born 6 December 1995), better known as Reynmen, is a Turkish singer and former vlogger, who rose to fame by sharing videos on Scorp and YouTube. His mother's cousins are comedian Cem Yılmaz and writer Can Yılmaz. He released "Derdim Olsun" in January 2019. This song was his first professional record and he earned fame by this song in Turkey. After that he released "Ela" in summer 2019. In 2020, he released his new song "Kaçamak" with German-Turkish rapper Ufo361. On his 25th birthday, he released his new song "Melek".

As of May 2020, Aktaş has the 8th most-subscribed YouTube channel in Turkey.

== Early life ==
Yusuf Aktaş was born on 6 December 1995. Reynmen is Azerbaijani Turk on his father's side and Kurdish from his mother's side. His family is from Sivas. Aktaş attended Ahmet Kabaklı School and later finished his primary education at Fatih Sultan Mehmet Primary School. He was later enrolled in Bahçeşehir İMKB Anatolian Technical and Industrial Vocational High School, however, he subsequently transferred to Başakşehir High School but did not graduate from there. He eventually completed high school by enrolling in an open plan school. As of 2020, Aktaş is studying Radio and Television Programming at Istanbul Aydın University.

== Controversies ==
=== Fake views allegations ===
Aktaş's song "Ela" was released together with a music video on YouTube. The video initially received more likes and comparatively less views, which was pointed out by singer Işın Karaca who accused Aktaş of manipulating the YouTube system. Aktaş responded to the allegations and said "It is a good thing to be ignorant, you think you know everything. No, I'm sad, she actually believes what she has said. She even wrote it in English, what a pity". Also, in an answer to a question on Instagram he made an insulting reference to Karaca without mentioning her name. Demet Akalın later liked a post that claimed the music video's number of views was fake and a fraud had taken place.

Aleyna Tilki criticized Aktaş's assertion that "he was the first Turk to reach number one on the world music list". Tilki shared a tweet showing that her song "Nasılsın Aşkta" was the first Turkish song to rank first in the world music list and accused Aktaş of putting up a show.

=== Adhan controversy ===
In Ramadan 2019, Aktaş shared a video of himself on social media in which he would start to recite adhan loudly close to people who were waiting for iftar and then laugh as they would actually believe it was the time for iftar. The video went viral on social media and received criticism from various people.

In the television program Söylemezsem Olmaz, the subject was taken on by the theologian Arif Arslan. Arslan reacted to the video and questioned Aktaş's actions: "Doesn't he have a mom or dad, did this child pop out of a stone hole?". Arslan also commented on the claim that Aktaş had made fun of the adhan and added that "He has committed apostasy, he must repent". Aktaş made a statement on these comments through his social media accounts and referring to the program's presenters added that he would "bring them to account in court.

== Discography ==
=== EPs ===
1. "RnBesk" (2020):
  1. "Leila"
  2. "Dolunay"
  3. "Hevesim Yok"
  4. "Yoksun Başımda"
  5. "Radyoda Neşet"

=== Singles ===
1. "Biziz" (ft. Lil Bege) (2017)
2. "Voyovoy" (ft. Veysel Zaloğlu) (2017)
3. "Toz Duman" (ft. Eypio) (2018)
4. "Derdim Olsun" (2019)
5. "Sen Aldırma" (ft. Bilal Sonses) (2019)
6. "Ela" (2019)
7. "Kaçamak" (ft. Ufo361) (2020)
8. "Aykız" (Remix) (2020)
9. "Az Sevdim" (ft. Özkan Meydan, Alican Özbuğutu) (2020)
10. "Melek" (2020)
11. "Bonita" (ft. Sefo) (2021)
12. "Yalan" (ft. Zeynep Bastık, Arem Özgüç and Arman Aydın) (2021)
13. "Pare" (2021)
14. "Aşkım" (with Soolking) (2022)
15. "Wherever You Go" (with Inna) (2022)
16. "Yanılmışım" (2022)
17. "Yana Yana" (with Semicenk) (2023)
18. "Pare (Anatolian Sessions Remix)" (2023)
19. "Cehennem" (2023)
20. "Film Şeridi" (with Baneva) (2023)
21. "Gitme" (Serdar Ortaç Şarkıları Vol. 2) (2023)
22. "Renklensin" (2024)
23. "Tavrına Hayran" (with Bilal Sonses) (2024)
24. "Cennet" (2024)
25. Neden Anlamadın Beni? (2024)
26. Nadide (2024)
27. Esmeri Sevdim Sarışınlara Kandım (with Ahiyan) (2024)
28. Cemalım (2024)
29. Silah (2024)

== Awards and nominations ==
Year	Award	Category	Nominee	Result
2019	Turkey Youth Awards	Best Instagrammer & YouYuber	Reynmen	Won
2019	INFLOW Awards	Best Instagram Influencer	Reynmen	Won
2019	Fizy Music Awards	Most Streamed Song	"Derdim Olsun"	Won
2019	Fizy Music Awards	Most Viewed Music Video	"Derdim Olsun"	Won
2019	Golden Butterfly Awards	Song of the Year	"Ela"	Won
2019	Golden Butterfly Awards	Best Debut by a Singer	Reynmen	Nominated
2019	Golden Butterfly Awards	Best Influencer	Reynmen	Nominated
