= Kandemir =

Kandemir is a surname. Notable people with the surname include:

- Helin Kandemir (born 2004), Turkish actress, voice actress and model
- Hüseyin Kandemir (born 1986), Turkish rower
- Mahmut Kandemir, American engineer
- Ömer Kandemir (born 1993), Turkish footballer
- Tuğçe Kandemir (born 1996), Turkish singer-songwriter and literature teacher
