= Berkcan Güven =

Turkish internet personality

- Born: 30 May 1996 (age 29); Istanbul, Turkey
- Other names: BEGE
- Occupations: Internet personality; YouTuber; singer
- Years active: 2014–present

YouTube information
- Channel: berkcanguvenn
- Genres: Vlogs; Comedy; Music
- Subscribers: 3.95 million
- Views: 884 million
- Last updated: 3 March 2026

Berkcan Güven (Turkish pronunciation: [bæɾcˈdʒan ɟyˈvæn]; born 30 May 1996), also known as BEGE, is a Turkish internet personality, YouTuber and singer.

As of March 2026, his YouTube channel has 3.95 million subscribers and over 884 million total views, ranking among the most-subscribed Turkish channels.

Güven first rose to fame on Vine in 2013 before transitioning to YouTube in 2014 with family vlogs and comedy sketches, particularly those featuring his grandmother. He later shifted to music under the stage name BEGE. In 2021 he released his debut album BEGEFENDİ. After a nearly three-year break from regular YouTube uploads to focus on music, he announced his return to the platform on 2 March 2026, stating that his DMs "exploded" and that he would upload a new video soon.

== Career ==
He has been shooting videos on games, music and entertainment since 2014. With the release of his diss track "YouTube Benim İşim" in 2017 and the songs "Yeniden" and "Neresi?" he managed to garner critical acclaim. His family members also regularly appear in his videos. The music video for "Yeniden" also featured appearances by Aleyna Tilki as a guest star and the video itself became trending in Turkey. After that he released "İlerle" in 2020.

In 2019, he came together with celebrities such as Ben Fero, Reynmen, Unlost and Efe Uygaç to start a donation campaign in his grandmother's name and donated ₺200,000 to the Hospice Presidency (Darülaceze Başkanlığı).

== Personal life ==
Güven is the son of voice actor and artist Burhan Güven. As of 2019, he is studying Visual Communication Design at Işık University.

== Discography ==
Güven has released records under the names Lil Bege and BEGE. The following is a list made by the data provided by Genius.

=== Albums ===
- BEGEFENDİ (2021)

=== Singles ===
- Çok Yakışıklıyım (2016)
- Para Bizde (Çok yakışıklıyım part 2) (ft. Efe Uygaç) (2017)
- Kilo Aldım (ft. EFESAVAGE) (2017)
- #Biziz (Reynmen ft. Lil Bege) (2017)
- YOUTUBE BENİM İŞİM (2017)
- Fenomen (ft. Ezhel) (2017)
- Berkcan Güven (ft. Çengel Tayfa) (2018)
- Yeniden (ft. Nova Norda) (2019)
- İlerle (2020)
- Spacejump (2020)
- Harman (2020)
- Nazar (2020)
- Eksi (ft. Murda, Summer Cem) (2021)
- B.S.G. (ft. Emir Taha) (2021)
- 24/7 (ft. ALIZADE) (2023)

== Awards ==
Year	Award	Category	Result	References
2017	Social Media Awards Turkey	Most Successful Instagram Celebrity	Won	
2018	Crystal Apple	Social Media Influencer	Won (silver award)	
2018	45th Golden Butterfly Awards	Best YouTuber/Instagrammer	Nominated	

== See also ==
- List of YouTubers
