= Istanbul Technical University Turkish Music State Conservatory =

Public school in Istanbul, Turkey

ITU Turkish Music State Conservatory
- Type: Public school
- Established: 1975
- Dean: Prof. Dr. Cihat Askin
- Location: Istanbul, Turkey
- Campus: Urban
- Website: www.tmdk.itu.edu.tr

ITU Turkish Music State Conservatory was founded in 1975 and is located on ITU's Macka campus, Istanbul.

== Notable alumni ==
- Ziynet Sali
- Volkan Konak
- Funda Arar
