= Arabesk =

Arabesk may refer to:

- Arabesk (Turkish music)
- Arabesk Airline Alliance
- Arabesk trilogy, a sequence of alternate history novels by the British author Jon Courtenay Grimwood
- Arabesk (film), a 1989 Turkish comedy film

== See also ==
- Arabesque (disambiguation)
