= Arabesque (disambiguation) =

Arabesque is a form of artistic decoration consisting of plant tendrils, leaves and flowers, very common in Islamic art. It may also refer to:

== Ballet ==
- Arabesque (ballet position)

== Music ==
=== Genres and compositions ===
- Arabesque (classical music)
  - Arabesques (Debussy), two piano pieces by Claude Debussy
  - Arabeske (Schumann), a piano piece by Robert Schumann
- Arabesque (Turkish music)

=== Artists ===
- Arabesque (group), a 1970s Euro disco group
- Arabesque (rapper) (born 1981), Canadian hip hop artist
- Arabesque, a British band formed by Keith Girdler and Paul Stewart of Blueboy

=== Albums ===
- Arabesque (Sibel Can album), 2016
- Arabesque: Geçmiş, Geçmemiş Hiç..., a 2010 album by Işın Karaca
- Arabesque (Rondò Veneziano album), a 1986 album by Rondò Veneziano
- Arabesque, album by John Klemmer 1977

=== Songs ===
- "Arabesque", single by 999 (band) 1984
- "Arabesque", by Ahmad Jamal from Crystal, 1987
- "Arabesque", a concert band piece composed by Samuel Hazo, 2008
- "Arabesque", by Nightwish from Imaginaerum, 2011
- "Arabesque", by Cheap Trick from Bang, Zoom, Crazy... Hello, 2016
- "Arabesque" (Coldplay song), 2019
- "Arabesque", by Avantasia from A Paranormal Evening with the Moonflower Society, 2022
- "Arabesque", by Lily Chou-Chou from Kokyū, 2001

=== Labels ===
- Arabesque Records, classical and jazz music label

== Television and film ==
- Arabesque (film), a 1966 film by Stanley Donen
- Arabesque, the French title for the television series Murder, She Wrote

== Other uses ==
- Arabesque (company), a Romanian building materials company
- Arabesque, a collar patch insignia used by German speaking countries' armed forces, see Kragenspiegel
- Arabesque Partners, an Anglo-German responsible investment management firm
- Arabesque, a manga by Ryoko Yamagishi
- Arabesque Software, producer of Ecco Pro
- Tales of the Grotesque and Arabesque, an Edgar Allan Poe story collection that defined a literary genre
- Arabesques (short story collection), a collection by Nikolai Gogol

== See also ==
- Arabesk (disambiguation)
