= Ziynet Sali =

Turkish-Cypriot singer (born 1975)

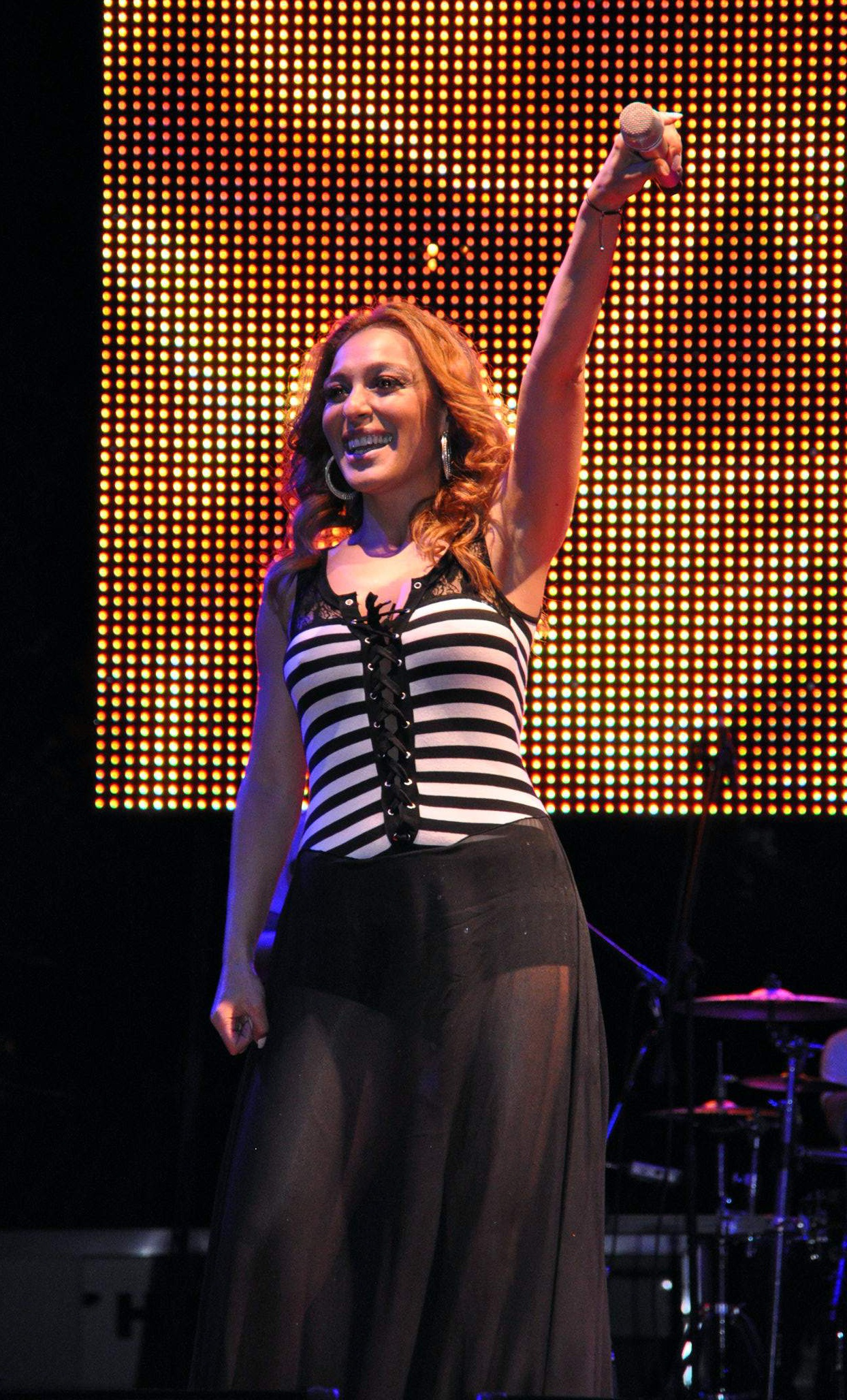
- Sali in 2011

Background information
- Born: Ziynet Sali Safter; 29 April 1975 (age 51); Nicosia, Turkish Federated State of Cyprus
- Genres: Pop; rebetiko (formerly); classical Turkish music (formerly)
- Occupation: Singer
- Years active: 1999–present
- Labels: DMC; Dost Müzik; GNL Entertainment; Ozan Video; Zorba

Ziynet Sali Safter (born 29 April 1975) is a Cypriot singer who also holds British citizenship. Her later works contain pop elements while her earlier works also had rebetiko and classical Turkish music themes.

Sali was born in Nicosia and then moved to England with her family. She returned to Cyprus in 1981 and completed her education until high school degree there. In 1994, she moved to Istanbul to study and in 1999, she graduated from the ITU Turkish Music State Conservatory. She started to perform as a professional vocalist while studying. Sali made her debut in 2000 with her first studio album released by Dost Music, Ba-Ba, that contains only Turkish songs. Amman Kuzum, her second studio album which was released by Zorba Müzik in 2004 contained Greek language songs too. Chiculata+1 (Amman Kuzum), a new edition of Amman Kuzum that also includes "Chiculata" was released by the same record label in 2005, and the next year, her third studio album Mor Yıllar was released by Ozan Video.

After release of her third studio album Herkes Evine by DMC in 2008, Bizde Böyle + Herkes Evine, a new version of the same album that also included "Bizde Böyle" was released by DMC. In 2010, her first non-album single "Rüya" was her first song that reached to the first place in Turkish music charts. She continued to work with DMC, and released "Bize Yeter" (2010) and Collection, her first compilation album. In 2012, GNL Entertainment released respectively her fifth studio album Sonsuz Ol and Sonsuz Ol + Remixes, an album that contains Sonsuz Ol and remix versions of some of her former songs. The next year, GNL Entertainment released Sali's first live album Bir Akdeniz Rüyası. Non-album single "Gelemiyorum Yanına" (2013) was her last work with GNL Entertainment before working with DMC again. In 2014, "Bugün Adım Leyla" and her second live album Bugün Adım Leyla were released respectively. After releasing of her sixth and the latest studio album No 6 in 2015, Sali continued her works by releasing four non-album singles, "Ağlar mıyım? Ağlamam" (2017), "Magic" (2017), "Deli Divanenim" (2018), and "Hadi Hoppalara" (2018). "Magic" was her first English song. Sali has received numerous awards and nominations during her career, including two Turkey Music Awards.

== Early life ==
Ziynet Sali Safter was born as one of the three children of a Turkish Cypriot couple on 29 April 1975 in Nicosia, which was the capital of the Turkish Federated State of Cyprus at that time. Her father who had moved in London from Cyprus in 1963, moved back to Cyprus permanently after meeting with Sali's mother during her visits to the island. After Sali's birth, the family started to live in London. Sali obtained British citizenship in that time. After completing her primary and secondary education in Cyprus following their return to the country, she graduated from the Polatpaşa High School in Lysi. After her graduation, she became one of the singers of the classical Turkish music choir of the Ministry of National Education and Culture. In 1994, she moved to Istanbul to study in the Istanbul Technical University Turkish Music State Conservatory. Sali started her professional musical works while she was studying, and graduated from the conservatory in 1999.

== Career ==
=== 1999–2007: First years, Ba-Ba, Amman Kuzum and Mor Yıllar ===
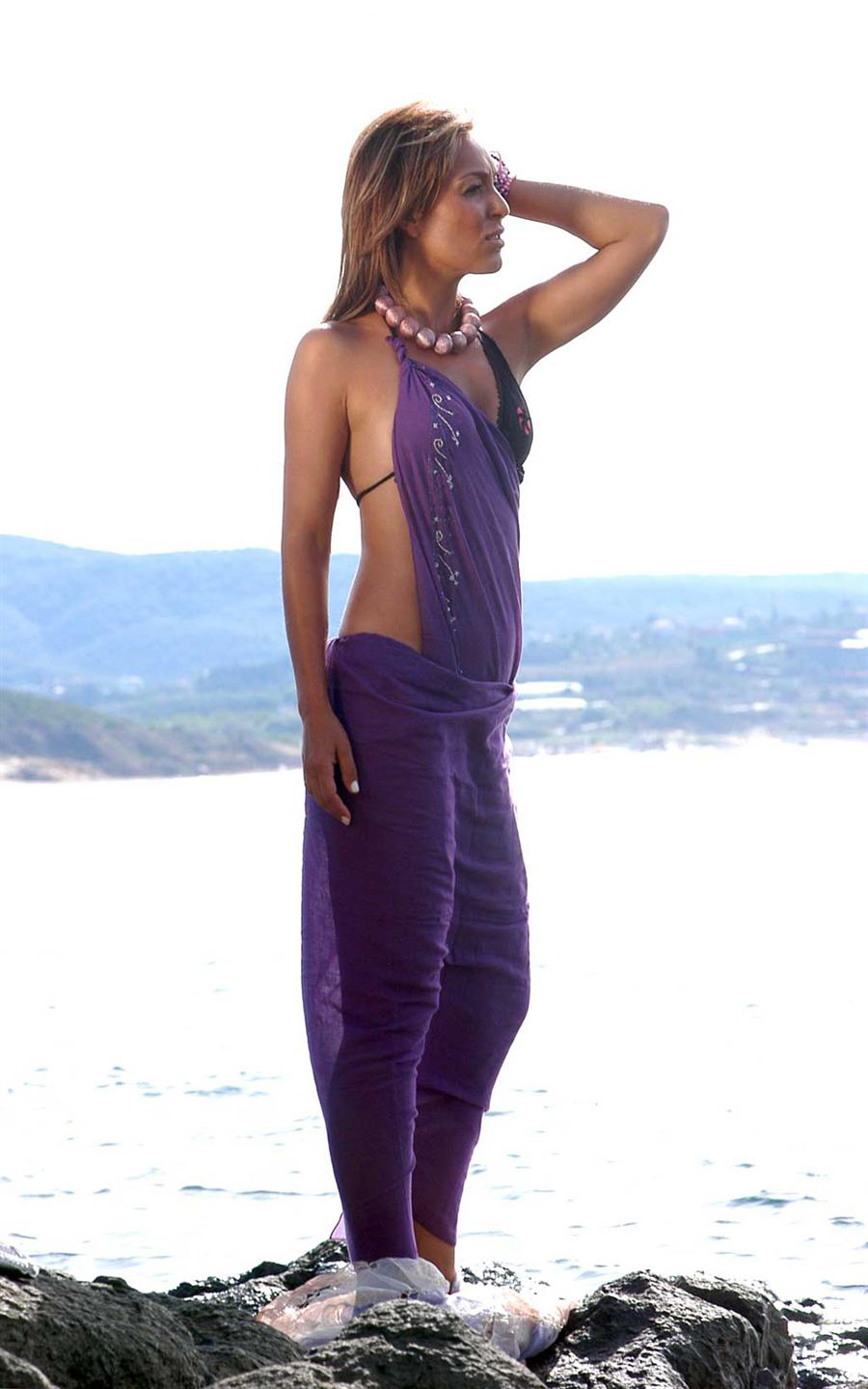
Ziynet Sali, 2006

After graduating as a music teacher and being unable to find a job, she started to perform in various entertainment venues. She started to work as a secretary in Dost Müzik in 1999 where she later became a press consultant. She made her debut in 2000 with her first studio album Ba-Ba which was released by Dost Müzik. A music video was produced for the album's lead song, "Ba-Ba". After this work, she started to take Greek music education and perform Greek language songs too in her live performances. In September 2004, her second studio album that contains Turkish and Greek pop songs Amman Kuzum, was released by Zorba Müzik. Two songs from the album, "Yürek Yaralı Büyüyor" and "Amman Kuzum" were accompanied by music videos. In 2005, a new version of the album that contains remixed versions of the songs and a new song "Chiculata" were released by Zorba Music as Chiculata+1 (Amman Kuzum).

Her third studio album that was released by Ozan Video in September 2006 contained Greek and Turkish language songs. Music videos were produced for "Zordur Oğlum" and "Mor Yıllar". "Zordur Oğlum" won the online voting for Eurodance 2007 which was made before the actual event, but couldn't get a place in the competition. She had a guest appearance as herself in the 100th episode of the Show TV series Cennet Mahallesi, broadcast on 16 December 2006. Then, she appeared as a singer in the 21st episode of Arka Sokaklar, a Kanal D series, broadcast on 2 January 2007. She was a Greek singer in Son Osmanlı Yandım Ali which was released in January 2007 making her first film appearance. At the same month Kalan Müzik released the songs "Alim" and "Kanaryam" by Sali which were produced for the film's soundtrack. She had her first recurring role in a TV series by performing as a night club singer Şükran Alev in the Fox series Kartallar Yüksek Uçar. The first episode of the series was broadcast on 29 September 2007, and it ended by its 4th episode.

=== 2008–11: Herkes Evine, "Bizde Böyle", "Rüya" and "Bize Yeter" ===
In September 2008, her fourth studio album Herkes Evine was released by DMC. She collaborated with Sezen Aksu and Sinan Akçıl in the album that consisted of two CD's, one in Turkish and the other one in Greek. Three songs from the album "Herkes Evine" "Beş Çayı", and "Hava Hoş" were accompanied by music videos. On 7 April 2009 she received the Special Prize at the 15th Traditional Kavram Olympics. In September 2009, a new album Bizde Böyle + Herkes Evine was released by DMC, an album containing "Bizde Böyle" in addition to Herkes Evine. in the same month, a music video was produced for "Bizde Böyle". She performed "Canımın Yoldaşı Ol" in Şükrü Tunar Eserleriyle Serkan Çağrı, clarinetist Serkan Çağrı's tribute album to Şükrü Tunar, which was released in November 2009. Sali won the Best Song, Composition and Lyrics award at the 13th İstanbul FM Music Awards, held on 15 December 2009. She appeared as herself in the New Year's Eve special episode of the Kanal D series Geniş Aile, broadcast on 31 December 2009.

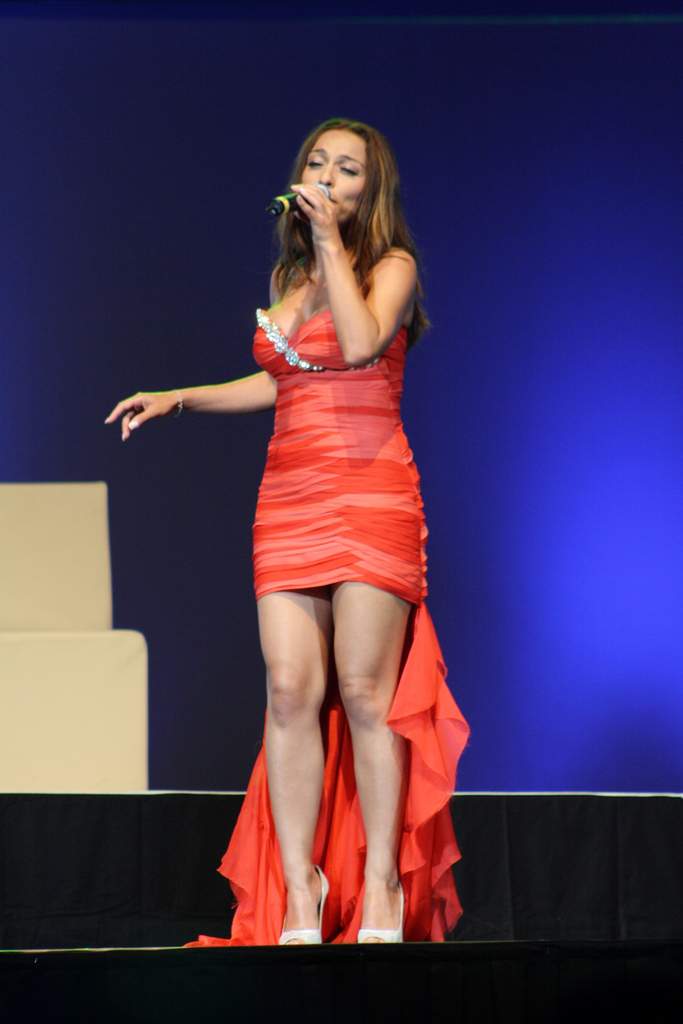
Sali during the 14th International Shining City Akçakoca Culture and Tourism Festival, 2010

In January 2010, her first non-album single "Rüya" was released by DMC. In the same month, a music video was produced for the single. According to the Nielsen Media Research data, the single reached to the number one place in the chart of the most played songs on Turkish radio stations. "Rüya", won the Single Album of the Year award at the Siyaset Dergisi Awards, held on 24 March. Sali, won the Best Female Pop Live Performance award at the 1st Pal FM Music Awards, on 18 February 2010. She performed "Sen Mutlu Ol" in the Ozan Doğulu album 130 Bpm (June 2010), and "Dolaşayım Damarlarında" in the Enbe Orkestrası album Kalbim (December 2010). A music video was also released for "Sen Mutlu Ol" in July. In December 2010, another non-single album of Sali, "Bize Yeter", and an accompanying music video were released by DMC. In February 2011, her first compilation album Collection which contains the songs from Mor Yılar and Herkes Evine, among with "Bizde Böyle", "Rüya" and "Bize Yeter" was released by DMC. In March 2011, she performed another version of "Bize Yeter" and appeared in the music video of the song that has different lyrics than the original version, related with the police forces, in the memory of the 166th anniversary of the General Directorate of Security. On 17 May 2011 "Rüya" won the Kral Music Award for the Most Played Song in Radio. She also received nominations for the Best Female Singer and the Best Song ("Rüya") categories. In August, she performed a remixed version of "Müptelayım Sana" in the Ozan Doğulu album 130 Bpm Allegro.

=== 2012–16: Sonsuz Ol, "Gelemiyorum Yanına", "Bugün Adım Leyla" and No 6 ===
In February 2012, she released "Alışkın Değiliz", a promotion single for her upcoming fifth studio album Sonsuz Ol, that was accompanied with a music video. The album was released in April 2012 by GNL Entertainment. Sali collaborated with Sinan Akçıl, Sezen Aksu, Kenan Doğulu, Sıla and Yıldız Tilbe, and also worked with Ozan Doğulu, Mustafa Ceceli and Ozan Çolakoğlu in the arrangement. Accompanying music videos were released for "Favori Aşkım", "Yanabiliriz", "Her Şey Çok Güzel Olacak", "Yine Geceler", "Deli" and "Senin Olsun". In August 2012, GNL Entertainment released Sonsuz Ol + Remixes, an album that contains Sonsuz Ol and remixes of some songs from Sonsuz Ol among with some of Sali's older songs. She performed "Sevenler Ağlarmış" in the Hüseyin Karadayı album Diskomatik that was released in October 2012. A remix version of "Alışkın Değiliz" also took place in the album.

Records of her concert Bir Akdeniz Rüyası, which took place in KüçükÇiftlik Park in Istanbul on 8 September 2012, was released as her first live album by GNL Entertainment as Bir Akdeniz Rüyası. She won the Best Music Video at the 1st Turkey Music Awards on 12 April 2013 with the music video of "Her Şey Çok Güzel Olacak" that was directed by Nihat Odabaşı. The music video also won an award in the same category at the 3rd Pal FM Music Awards on 6 May 2013. In November 2013, a non-album single which was written and composed by Sinan Akçıl "Gelemiyorum Yanına" was released by GNL Entertainment. On 27 December 2013 she won the Best Female Pop Artist award at the 2013 Bests of the Year Awards of the Haliç University. She became one of the judges of the Kanal D reality talent show X Factor from the first episode on 10 February 2014, but the show had a break after the episode on 24 March, and after it started to be aired again, Sali was dismissed from the judging panel. She, Volkan Konak and Fettah Can voiced "Arzuhalcinin Yazamadıkları" in Büyük Resim, an album released in April 2014 for the 15th anniversary of the establishing of the Turkey Handicapped Sports, Education and Assistance Foundation. She had a guest appearance as herself in the 16th episode of Kanal D TV show Arkadaşım Hoşgeldin, broadcast on 17 April 2014. She performed "Naparsan Yap" in the Ozan Doğulu album 130 Bpm Moderato (July 2014) and appeared in the music video of the song. Her non-album singe "Benim Adım Leyla" was released by DMC along with an accompanying music video in September 2014. In November 2014, her three CD album Bugün Adım Leyla was released by DMC. The first CD contained "Bugün Adım Leyla" while the second and third CD's contained her live performances at the Beşiktaş Cultural Center.

In February 2015, she made a duet performance with Hayyam Nisanov of "İstanbul" in the Enbe Orkestrası album Enbe Orkestrası & Behzat Gerçekler and appeared in the music video of the song that was released later. On 28 February 2015 she received the Most Successful Female Celebrity of the Year award at the 12numara.com.tr Firsts Awards of the Year. In July 2015, Sali appeared as a guest singer in GülSara single "Follow Me". In the same month, her sixth studio album No 6 was released by DMC. Two songs were written by Mete Özgencil while the rest of the songs in the album were written by Sıla. From the album, music videos were produced for "Mevsimsizim", "Dağınık Yatak", "Çeyrek Gönül" and "Başrol". She made a guest appearance in the 11th episode of Buyur Burdan Yak, a stage show that was played at the Beşiktaş Cultural Center and broadcast on Kanal D on 11 October 2015. At the 3rd En Moda Magazine Bests of the Year Awards on 20 January 2016, she won the Best Female Artist of the Year and the Best Album of the Year (with No 6) awards. She performed the Ozan Doğulu single "Yağmur" which was released with an accompanying music video in August 2016. At the Daf Bama Music Awards which was held on 27 August 2016, she won the Akdeniz's Best Artist and Best Female Turkish Artist awards; her album (No 6) ve and one of her music videos ("Başrol") were also nominated in separate categories.

=== 2017–present: "Ağlar mıyım? Ağlamam", "Magic" and "Deli Divanenim" ===
In January 2017, she collaborated with Enbe Orkestrası on the band's single "Bir Melekten Hediye", and she appeared on its music video which was released by DMC. At the Istanbul University 1453 Awards on 18 May 2017, she won the Female Musician of the Year award. In October of the same year, another single "Ağlar mıyım? Ağlamam" was released by DMC with an accompanying music video. In November, her first English language single "Magic" that features Anthony Johnson and its music video were released by DMC. In December 2017, she received nominations for the Pop Singer of the Year-Female, and the Song of the Year by "Bir Melekten Hediye" (with Enbe Orkestrası) and "Yağmur" (with Ozan Doğulu) at the 44th Golden Butterfly Awards. In May 2018, her single "Deli Divanenim" which was written and composed by Sezen Aksu was released by DMC. Sali won the Best Foreign Single of the Year award at the Best of Kültür Awards on 7 June 2018. In August 2018, DMC released her single "Hadi Hoppalara" featuring Berk Coşkun, with the music video of the single.

On 6 February 2019 she released a cover version and an accompanying music video of Bob Marley's "No Woman, No Cry" (1974) on YouTube, as a tribute to mark his 74th birthday. On 14 March a cover version of Ferdi Tayfur's song "Bana da Söyle" (1991) was released by DMC, with an accompanying music video. The song ranked first on Turkey's official music chart for five consecutive weeks.

On 10 February 2020 DMC released Sali's single "Ömrüm" ahead of the 2020 Valentine's Day. The song was written by Tuğçe Ören Nihat Odabaşı directed its music video, in which Sali's husband also appeared. The song will be included in her upcoming album that will be released by March 2020.

== Music style ==
Beginning since her first album, she started to work on Greek language music. While she was performing rebetiko songs formerly, Sali is performing pop songs currently.

== Personal life ==
Sali has two brothers. She lives in an apartment in Gayrettepe, Istanbul. She bought a villa in Çatalköy in 2005, and an apartment in Dereboyu, North Nicosia, in 2006. On 15 September 2019 Sali married Erkan Erzurumlu at Merit Royal Hotel in Northern Cyprus.

== Discography ==
=== Studio albums ===
- Ba-Ba (2000, Dost Müzik)
- Amman Kuzum (2004, Zorba Müzik)
- Mor Yıllar (2006, Ozan Video)
- Herkes Evine (2008, DMC)
- Sonsuz Ol (2012, GNL Entertainment)
- No 6 (2015, DMC)
- Yaşam Çiçeği (2021, DMC)

=== Compilation albums ===
- Chiculata+1 (Amman Kuzum) (2005, Dost Müzik)
- Bizde Böyle + Herkes Evine (2009, DMC)
- Collection (2011, DMC)
- Sonsuz Ol + Remixes (2012, GNL Entertainment)

=== Live albums ===
- Bir Akdeniz Rüyası (2013, GNL Entertainment)

=== Singles ===
As lead artist

- "Rüya" (2009, DMC)
- "Bize Yeter" (2010, DMC)
- "Alışkın Değiliz" (2012, DMC)
- "Gelemiyorum Yanına" (2013, GNL Entertainment)
- "Bugün Adım Leyla" (2014, DMC)
- "Follow Me" (ft. GülSara) (2015, DMC)
- "Yağmur" (with Ozan Doğulu) (2016, DMC)
- "Bir Melekten Hediye" (ft. Enbe Orkestrası) (2017, DMC)
- "Ağlar mıyım? Ağlamam" (2017, DMC)
- "Magic" (ft. Marshall) (2017, Room Recordings Ltd)
- "Deli Divanenim" (2018, DMC)
- "Hadi Hoppalara" (ft. Berk Coşkun) (2018, DMC)
- "Sanane Be" (2018, DMC)
- "Bana da Söyle" (2019, DMC)
- "Ömrüm" (2020, DMC)
- "Yara" (ft. Bilal Sonses) (2020, DMC)
- "Kalbim Tatilde" (2020, DMC)
- "Sana Doyamıyorum" (2022, DMC)
- "Bozulmuş Kalbim" (with Semicenk and İlkan Günüç) (2022, DMC)
- "Aşk Nerede" (2022, ZG Müzik)
- "Duy İstanbul" (2023, ZG Müzik)
- "Adresi Sormadım" (2023, ZG Müzik & DMC)
- "İmkânsız Bir Aşk Denir" (2024, ZG Müzik & DMC)
- "Daha Nasıl Sevebilirim" (2024, ZG Müzik & DMC)
- "Yandım Ateşinle" (2024, ZG Müzik & DMC)
- "Bronz Ten" (2024, ZG Müzik & DMC)
- "Müptelanım Bilgine" (2024, ZG Müzik & DMC)
- "Uyku Tutmadı" (2025, ZG Müzik & DMC)
- "Bir Garip Olur İçim" (2025, ZG Müzik & DMC)

As featured artist

- "Kanaryam" ve "Alim" (2007, from the album Son Osmanlı Yandım Ali)
- "Canımın Yoldaşı Ol" (2009, from the album Şükrü Tunar Eserleriyle)
- "Herkes Evine (Burak Yeter Remix)" (2009, from the album Connection)
- "Dolaşayım Damarlarında" (2010, from the album Kalbim)
- "Sen Mutlu Ol" (2010, from the album 130 Bpm)
- "Müptelayım Sana" (2011, from the album 130 Bpm Allegro)
- "Sevenler Ağlarmış (Hüseyin Karadayı Remix)" and "Alışkın Değiliz (Hüseyin Karadayı Remix)" (2012, from the album Diskomatik)
- "Naparsan Yap" (2014, from the album 130 Bpm Moderato)
- "Arzuhalcinin Yazamadıkları" and "Büyük Resim (TESYEV)" (2014, from the album Büyük Resim)
- "İstanbul (ft. Xhayiyam Nisanov)" (2015, from the album Enbe Orkestrası & Behzat Gerçekler)
- "Hasret" (2018, from the album Şarkı Gibi Şarkılar)
- "Etme Eyleme" (2019, from the album Altın Düetler 2)
- "Asrın Hatası" (2022, from the album Serdar Ortaç Şarkıları, Vol. 1)
- "Belalım Benim" (2023, from the album 40 Yıl)

== Filmography ==
Year	Title	Role	Notes
2006	Cennet Mahallesi	Herself	TV series, 100th episode
2007	Arka Sokaklar	Singer	TV series, 21st episode
2007	Son Osmanlı Yandım Ali	Greek singer	
2007	Kartallar Yüksek Uçar	Şükran Alev	TV series, 4 episodes
2009	Geniş Aile	Herself	TV series, New Year's Eve special episode
2014	Arkadaşım Hoşgeldin	Herself	TV series, 16th episode
2015	Buyur Burdan Bak	Herself	TV series, 11th episode

== Awards and nominations ==
Award	Ceremony	Category	Nominated work/person	Result	Reference(s)
15th Geleneksel Kavram Olympics	7 April 2009	Special Award	Ziynet Sali	Won	
13th İstanbul FM Music Awards	15 December 2009	Best Song, Composition and Lyrics	"Beş Çayı"	Won	
1st Pal FM Music Awards	18 February 2010	Best Female Pop Live Performance	Ziynet Sali	Won	
Siyaset Magazine Awards	24 March 2010	Single Album of the Year	"Rüya"	Won	
17th Kral Music Awards	17 May 2011	Radyolarda En Çok Çalınan Şarkı	"Rüya"	Won	
17th Kral Music Awards	17 May 2011	Best Song	"Rüya"	Nominated	
17th Kral Music Awards	17 May 2011	Best Female Artist	Ziynet Sali	Nominated	
1st Turkey Music Awards	12 April 2013	Best Music Video	"Her Şey Çok Güzel Olacak"	Won	
3rd Pal FM Music Awards	6 May 2013	Best Music Video	"Her Şey Güzel Olacak"	Won	
Haliç University 2013 Awards	27 December 2013	Best Female Pop Artist of the Year	Ziynet Sali	Won	
12numara.com.tr Best of the Year Awards	28 February 2015	Most Successful Female Celebrity of the Year	Ziynet Sali	Won	
3rd En Moda Magazine the Bests of the Year	20 January 2016	Best Female Artist of the Year	Ziynet Sali	Won	
3rd En Moda Magazine the Bests of the Year	20 January 2016	Best Album of the Year	No 6	Won	
Daf Bama Music Awards	27 August 2016	Akdeniz's Best Artist	Ziynet Sali	Won	
Daf Bama Music Awards	27 August 2016	Best Female Turkish Artist	Ziynet Sali	Won	
Daf Bama Music Awards	27 August 2016	Best Album	No 6	Nominated	
Daf Bama Music Awards	27 August 2016	Best Video	"Başrol"	Nominated	
Istanbul University 1453 Awards	18 May 2017	Music Woman of the Year	Ziynet Sali	Won	
44th Golden Butterfly Awards	10 December 2017	Pop Singer of the Year-Female	Ziynet Sali	Nominated	
44th Golden Butterfly Awards	10 December 2017	Song of the Year	"Bir Melekten Hediye" (with Enbe Orkestrası)	Nominated	
44th Golden Butterfly Awards	10 December 2017	Song of the Year	"Yağmur" (with Ozan Doğulu)	Nominated	
Best of Culture Awards	7 June 2018	Best Foreign Single of the Year	"Magic"	Won	
