= Sibel Can =

Turkish singer and actress (born 1970)

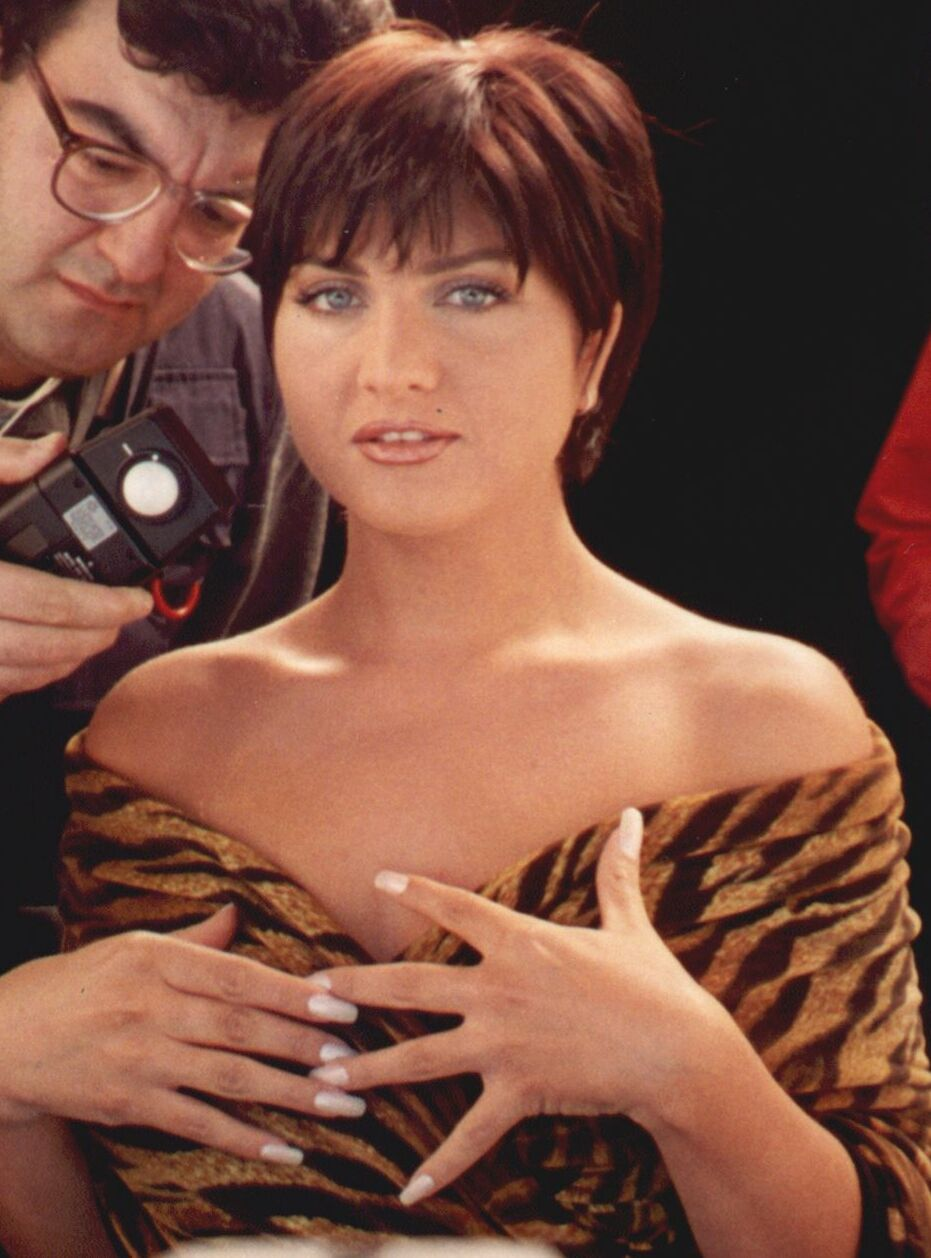
- Sibel Can
- Born: Sibel Cangüre; 1 August 1970 (age 56); Istanbul, Turkey
- Occupations: Singer; actress; TV presenter; belly dancer
- Years active: 1984–present
- Spouses: Hakan Ural (m. 1988; div. 1999) Sulhi Aksüt (m. 2000; div. 2010)
- Children: 3
- Musical career
- Genres: Arabesque; fantasy; pop; classical Turkish
- Instrument: Vocals
- Labels: Kervan; Raks; Universal; Emre; DMC; Sibel Can; Sony
- Website: www.sibelcan.com

Sibel Can (born Sibel Cangüre; 1 August 1970) is a Turkish singer and actress. She became a dancer at the age of 14 and later started her music career.

== Early life ==
Sibel Can was born in Karagümrük, Fatih, as the first child of Engin Cangüre and Emine Gül Sezer Cangüre. Her father was a Muslim Yugoslav immigrant and a violinist who accompanied many famous singers on their concerts. Her mother was from Mudanya.

== Career ==
=== Career beginnings ===
At the age of 14 she started her career as a belly dancer. She worked as both a belly dancer and a soloist with her father during their tours across Turkey. Can, who appeared in the clubs such as Galata Tower and Astorya, accepted Nükhet Duru and Fahrettin Arslan's offer to perform at Maksim Casino at the age of 17. Due to Can's minority, the casino became under the threat of closure, and after court proceedings her date of birth was changed to 1964. At Maksim Casino she worked with the likes of Muazzez Abacı, Neşe Karaböcek and Emel Sayın. In 1987, she released her first album, Günah Bize, which was produced by Kervan Plak. Orhan Gencebay helped her with the album's preparations. In 1988, she started performing at Maksim Casino as a singer. Orhan Gencebay served as the producer for her first albums.

=== 1990s: Rise to fame ===
In the late 1980s and early 1990s, Can released a new album each year and in 1995 she signed a contract with Raks Müzik. Her ninth studio album, Bu Devirde, was released in 1997 with its lead single, "Padişah", being written by Serdar Ortaç. Following the success of the album, Can released a music video for the lead single, directed by Tayfun Dinçer. With the release of this music video Can got a massive fan base and the album topped the sales charts in Turkey. Following this success, Can started to perform at many concerts. Businessman Kadir Has famously praised her at a business dinner saying: "Sibel, all my money is yours", while President Süleyman Demirel commented by saying: "I swear to God, it's all worth it for this girl".

=== 2000s–present ===
In 2000, Can's new album, İşte Türk Sanat Müziği İşte Sibel Can, was released. In 2001, she started working with the production company Emre Plak. In 2002, Can was cast in a leading role in the movie Papatya ile Karabiber. In 2006, her album Özledin mi? sold 200,000 copies and received a diamond certification from MÜ-YAP. At the award ceremony for receiving the certification, Can performed the song "Lale Devri" from the same album together with Sezen Aksu, who had written and composed the song. In 2007, the album Akşam Sefası was released, which featured the song "Çakmak Çakmak". The song, which was written and composed by Tarkan, was well-received by fans and critics. In 2009, a new album titled Benim Adım Aşk was released, followed by Seyyah in 2011. The song "Hançer" from the latter became a hit song in Turkey. In April 2012, Can released another album titled Meşk. In February 2014, her twentieth album, Galata, was released. Can also played in Cashmere Carpet advertisements for a while and was the face of this brand for many years.

In April 2016, Can's new album Arabesque was released by DMC. The composer and songwriter Burhan Bayar composed all of the songs in this album, including "Gülüm Benim", "Sevmek", "Bu da Geçer", "Mavi Mavi", "Seninle ilk defa", "Yalnızım dostlarım", "Mutlu Ol Yeter", "Hasret Rüzgârları", "Benim Hatım", and "Gurbet Geceleri", all of which had the style of the 1980s' Turkish songs. On 9 April 2016, Can performed at the Bostancı Show Center, followed by another concert at the Cemil Topuzlu Open-Air Theatre on 10 August 2016, during which she performed her new songs and said: "The great master of Arabesque music, Orhan Gencebay, discovered my talent; I have loved Arabesque music ever since". At her concert on 10 August 2016 she performed the song "Bağdat" together with Ayla Çelik, followed by the performance of the song "Günah Benim" with rappers Eypio and Burak King in the form of arabesque and rock. Before the concert Can said: "I got to know Eypio and Burak King through my children. Their music video has been watched over 100 million times. I'm so excited to rap for the first time". In October 2016, she joined the singing competition O Ses Türkiye as a judge. In November 2016, she was chosen as the Best Arabesque-Fantasy Music Artist at the Golden Butterfly Awards. Following the award ceremony, people reacted to Okan Bayülgen's jokes about Can's weight. The greatest backlash came from Can's ex-husband, Hakan Ural, and Bayülgen was heavily criticized. In 2017, Can was cast in a leading role on the TV series Sevda'nın Bahçesi.

In June 2018, her twenty second album, Yeni Aşkım, was released by DMC. Mayk Şişman from Milliyet wrote in his review about the album: "It is gratifying that Sibel Can has included songs from Bahadır Tatlıöz and Yalın in her album. It is also pleasing to know that she aims to offer different tastes within her own limits and does not rely only on Tarkan or Serdar Ortaç songs".

== Personal life ==
Can married Hakan Ural at Zerrin Özer's house in 1988. From this marriage she has two children: Engincan and Melisa. The couple divorced in 1999. One year later she married Sulhi Aksüt and later gave birth to their son Emir. Can and Sulhi Aksüt divorced in 2010.

== Discography ==
=== Albums ===
- Günah Bize (1987)
- Bulursun Beni (1988)
- Rüyalarda Buluşuruz (1989)
- Hasretim (1990)
- Bir Güneş Batışında (1991)
- Seni Sevmek (1992)
- Hayat Devam Ediyor (1993) with Orhan Gencebay
- Hatirasidir (1994)
- Şarkılar Senden Yana (1995)
- Bu Devirde (1997)
- Daha Yolun Basindayim (2000)
- İşte Türk Sanat Müziği (2000)
- Canim Benim (2001)
- Sen Benimsin (2003)
- Özledin Mi? (2005)
- Akşam Sefası (2007)
- Benim Adım Aşk (2009)
- Seyyah (2011)
- Meşk (2012)
- Galata (2014)
- Arabesque (2016)
- Yeni Aşkım (2018)
- Hayat (2020)
- Drama (2025)

=== Singles ===
- "Helin" (2011)
- "Kış Masalı" (Mustafa Ceceli Remix) (2014)
- "Hangimiz Sevmedik" (2015)
- "Bir Parmak Bal" (2015)
- "Milletin Duâsı" (with various artists) (2018)
- "Kuyu" (2018)
- "Adı Elveda Olsun" (2021)
- "Bize Kaldı" (2022)
- "Karakol" (2023)

=== As featured artist ===
- "Kahır Mektubu" (2011) from the album 130 Bpm Allegro
- "Bilmesin Felek" (2012) from the album Orhan Gencebay ile Bir Ömür
- "Alkışlar" (2013) from the album Proje 2
- "Mihriban" and "Telli Turnam" (2015) from the album Musa Eroğlu ile Bir Asır
- "Emi" (2018) from the album Yıldız Tilbe'nin Yıldızlı Şarkıları

== Filmography ==
Movies
Year	Title	Role	Notes
2002	Papatya ile Karabiber	Papatya	
Tv Series
Year	Title	Role	Notes
1996	Kaldırım Çiçeği	Aslı	
1997	Gülüm	Gül	
1998	Sibel	Sibel	
1999	Bize Ne Oldu	Kezban	
2000	Berivan	Berivan	
2005	Saklambaç	Fidan	
2006	Ah İstanbul	Hayat	
2017	Sevda'nın Bahçesi	Sevda	
Programming
Year	Title	Role	Notes
2002	Tatlı ve Huysuz Show	Herself	
2016	O Ses Türkiye	Herself	
2016	Sibel Can'la Yılbaşı Özel	Herself	
2021	Şarkılar Bizi Söyler	Herself	
