= Tuğçe Kandemir =

Turkish singer-songwriter

- Born: 23 February 1996 (age 29); Ankara, Turkey
- Genres: Pop
- Occupations: Singer, teacher
- Years active: 2018–present
- Spouse: Abdullah Karatay (m. 2023)

Tuğçe Kandemir (born 23 February 1996) is a Turkish singer-songwriter and literature teacher.

Kandemir is known for her songs on love and sadness. Her father is an officer and her mother is a housewife. She has an elder sibling. She first became interested in music at the age of 8. Kandemir is a graduate of Mersin University School of Literature. While waiting for her assignment to a school as a teacher, she became famous with her song "Bu Benim Öyküm", which was released on the Internet. She then successful signed a contract with a music label, producing a music video for the song, which surpassed 100 million views on YouTube. She further rose to prominence with her subsequent songs "Gülü Soldurmam", "Yanlış" and "İçimdeki Sen (feat. Bilal Sonses)", all of which were viewed more than 100 million times on YouTube. Her 2019 single "Yelkovan" garnered 50 million views on the same platform. She still continues her career as a teacher in Mersin University.

== Discography ==
Singles

- "Bu Benim Öyküm" (2018)
- "Yanlış" (2018)
- "İçimdeki Sen" (ft. Bilal Sonses) (2018)
- "Gülü Soldurmam" (2019)
- "Yelkovan" (2019)
- "Yağmur" (2019)
- "El-Âlem" (2020)
- "Açıldı Kapılar" (ft. Roni Can Durmus) (2020)
- "Kurban Olduğum" (2020)
- "Kördüğüm" (with Özkan Meydan & Alican Özbuğutu) (2020)
- "Ne Güzel Yaratmış" (2020)
- "Seni Öptüğüm Sokak" (with Eypio) (2021)
- "Ah Ellerim Kırılaydı" (2021)
- "İğdeli Yar (Remix)" (2021)
- "Kahverengi Gözlerin" (Sevda Yüklü Şarkılar) (2021)
- "Sakın Ola" (2021)
- "Saçlarıma Yıldız Takana" (2022)
- "Anlı Şanlı" (2022)
- "Saf Kalbim" (2022)
- "Kaybet" (2022)
- "Kapattum Yureğumi" (ft. Selçuk Balcı) (2022)
- "Kardan Çiçekler" (ft. Pınar Süer) (2022)
- "Yana Yana" (2023)
- "Sonbahar" (2023)
- "Kalbim Kırgın" (ft. Bedo) (2023)
- "Aç Gözünü" (ft. Kurtuluş Kuş) (2023)
- "Evlenelim mi Sevgilim" (2024)
- "Aradan Çok Yıllar Geçti" (2024)
- "İhanetten Geri Kalan" (ft. Anıl Şallıel) (2024)
- "Açıldı Kapılar" (2024)

== Awards ==
Year	Award	Nominee	Category	Result
2018	Magazinn.com Media and Art Awards	"Bu Benim Öyküm"	Best Debut by an Artist	Won
2019	Fizy Music Awards	"İçimdeki Sen"	Most Streamed Duet of the Year	Won
2020	Gold Faces of Turkey	"Kurban Olduğum"	Cover Song of the Year	Won
