= Emrah Karaduman =

Turkish composer (born 1987)

- Born: 4 November 1987 (age 38); Samsun, Turkey
- Genres: Dance; electronic; pop
- Occupations: Composer; arranger; DJ; record producer
- Instrument: Keyboard
- Years active: 2009–present
- Label: DMC

Emrah Karaduman (born 4 November 1987) is a Turkish composer and arranger.

== Life and career ==
Karaduman was born 4 November 1987 in Samsun. Although he later enrolled in the conservatory to study music, he could not continue his education due to financial difficulties. After working in bars in Samsun for a while, he moved to Istanbul to pursue a career in music. While working in a bar in Kadıköy, Hande Yener's stage crew reached to him and offered him to join Yener's orchestra. He worked with Yener for many years. Afterwards, he composed or arranged the songs of various singers including Demet Akalın, İrem Derici, Emir, Bengü, Mustafa Ceceli, Murat Boz and Hadise, as well as various songs of Hande Yener.

His first studio album Toz Duman was released by DMC on 12 June 2015. Separate music videos were shot for the songs "İntikam", "Nerden Bilecekmiş" and "Kırk Yılda Bir Gibisin" from the album. The songs were performed by Demet Akalın, İrem Derici and Murat Dalkılıç respectively.

A breakthrough in his career came with the release of his first official single, "Cevapsız Çınlama", which featured vocals by Aleyna Tilki.

== Knife attack ==
In 2017, he was the victim of a knife attack in Eskişehir.

== Discography ==
=== Studio albums ===
- Toz Duman (2015)
- BombarDuman (2018)

=== EPs ===
- .Wave (2022)
- İllallah (Remixes) (2022)

=== Singles ===
- "Cevapsız Çınlama" (feat. Aleyna Tilki) (2016)
- "Believe in Me" (2018)
- "Ara Beni" (feat. Çağla) (2019)
- "Ben Ölmeden Önce" (feat. Buray) (2019)
- "Never Letting Go" (2019)
- "Policestanbul" (2020)
- "Güllerim Soldu" (feat. Dila Uzun) (2020)
- "All Night" (2020)
- "Love Got You" (2021)
- "Back To You" (2021)
- "All Night (Remixes)" (2021)
- "İllallah" (feat. Emirhan Çakmak) (2021)
- "Yuh Yuhh" (feat. Yasin Keleş & Selda Bağcan) (2022)
- "Kaptan" (with Merve Özbey) (2022)
- "Veda" (with Eylül Ayan & Aksel) (2022)
- "Tiempo" (2022)
- "On My Mind" (2023)
- "Green Pine" (2023)
- "Love Drunk" (2023)
- "Good Time" (2023)
- "Good Time (Extended Mix)" (2023)
- "Watch" (2023)
- "Bir İmkansız Var" (with Merve Özbey) (2023)
- "Müthişsin" (with KÖK$VL) (2024)
- "Deli Yangınım" (with İrem Derici) (2024)
- "Şeker Oğlan" (with Yasin Keleş & Elif Buse Doğan) (2025)
- "Araba x Seninle Başım Dertte" (with Selami Şahin & M Lisa) (2025)
- "O Değil Ki" (with Mavi Gri) (2025)
