= İşte Türk Sanat Müziği =

Studio album by Sibel Can
- Released: 4 June 2000 (Turkey)
- Recorded: 2002
- Genre: Classical music
- Length: 42:43
- Label: Emre Plak
- Producer: Raks Müzik

Sibel Can chronology
Daha Yolun Başındayım (1999)	İşte Türk Sanat Müziği (2000)	Canım Benim (2001)

İşte Türk Sanat Müziği is Turkish singer Sibel Can's twelfth studio album, which was released on 4 June 2000 in Turkey.

== Track listing ==
No.	Title	Writer(s)	Composer (s)	Length
1.	"Gelse O Şuh Meclise"	Hafız Post	Hafız Post
2.	"Baharın Gülleri Açtı"	Dramalı Hasan	Dramalı Hasan
3.	"Sevmekten Kim Usanır"	Mühir Ebcioğlu	Teoman Alpay
4.	"Unut Beni"	Ahmet Kaçar	Şükrü Tunar
5.	"Yemenimde hare var"	Anonymous	Anonymous
6.	"Ne İdi Ne Oldu Halim"	Sadettin Kaynak	Sadettin Kaynak
7.	"Hastayım Yaşıyorum"	Dramalı Hasan	Dramalı Hasan
8.	"Söyleyemem Derdimi"	Şükrü Tunar	Şükrü Tunar
9.	"Gönlüm Yaralı"	Kadri Şençalar	Kadri Şençalar
10.	"Canımın Yoldaşı Ol"	Şükrü Tunar	Şükrü Tunar
11.	"Ayrılık Ateşten Bir Ok"	Fahri Kayahan	Fahri Kayahan
12.	"Ah Bu Sefer"	Fahri Kayahan	Fahri Kayahan
Total length:				42:43
