= Sefo =

Turkish musical artist

- Born: Seyfullah Sağır; 16 March 1998 (age 28); Samsun, Turkey
- Genres: Pop rap; reggaeton; dancehall; trap; reggae; pop
- Occupations: Singer; songwriter; rapper
- Years active: 2018–present
- Label: Sony

Seyfullah Sağır (born 16 March 1998), better known as Sefo, is a Turkish singer, songwriter and rapper. He rose to fame in Turkey with his song "Bilmem mi?", which features reggaeton elements.

== Life and career ==
Seyfullah Sağır was born on 16 March 1998 in Samsun.

In March 2018, he released his first single "Yalan". In February 2019, and with the success of his second single "Poz" he decided to pursue a professional career in music. On 18 April 2019, he released the single "Up Down", followed by "362" in June 2019. The majority of his songs feature pop elements as well.

On 21 February 2020, he released the song "Başa Sar", featuring Aerro and Yase. Other singles include "Ardından", "YOUNGSTAR", "İhtiyacım Yok", "Liman", "Toz Duman", "Bonita (ft. Reynmen)", and "Bilmem mi?", the last of which topped the music charts in Turkey.

In June 2022, he was controversially removed from stage during his concert in Bodrum, Turkey by officials acting on behalf of the district governor’s office. The reason was a Coronavirus pandemic restriction still in place that forbade musical events lasting past 1 AM. However, what outraged Sefo and his fans was that the forceful removal happened at 12:30 AM, for unclear reasons.

== Discography ==
=== Albums ===
- İmparator pt.1 (2024)

=== Singles ===
- Yalan (2018)
- Poz (2019)
- Up Down (2019)
- 362 (2019)
- Derdi Ne? (2019)
- Başa Sar (ft. Aerro, Yase) (2020)
- Rest (2020)
- Kaybol (ft. Revart) (2020)
- Nerdeyim? (2020)
- Geri Gel (2020)
- Ardından (2021)
- Youngstar (2021)
- İhtiyacım Yok (2021)
- Liman (2021)
- Toz Duman (2021)
- Bonita (ft. Reynmen) (2021)
- Bilmem mi? (2021)
- Affettim (2022)
- Mírame (Bilmem mi? Remix) (ft. Reik) (2022)
- Yarım Kalır (ft. Revart) (2022)
- Tutsak (2022)
- Isabelle (ft. CAPO) (2022)
- Kördüğüm (ft. Jako) (2022)
- Şahane (ft. Organize) (2022)
- Gitti (ft. Aerro) (2022)
- Beni Beni (2022)
- Veda Saati (2023)
- Söyleneydibu? (2023)
- Araba (2023)
- İmparator (2023)
- Görmem Böylesini (ft. Simge) (2023)
- Erken (2023)
- Kapalı Kapılar (2024)
- Yanıbaşımda (2024)
- Türkiye'm (2024)
- Kaçak Göçek (2024)
- Nar (ft. Jako) (2025)
- Derdim Var (2025)
- Afacan (2025)
- Aşiyan (ft. Afra) (2025)
- Yerinde Dur (ft. Demet Akalın) (2025)

=== Charts ===
List of singles, release date and album name
Single	Year	Peak
Single	Year	TR
"Tutsak"	2022	1
"Isabelle"	2022	2
