= Merve Özbey =

Turkish singer and songwriter (born 1988)

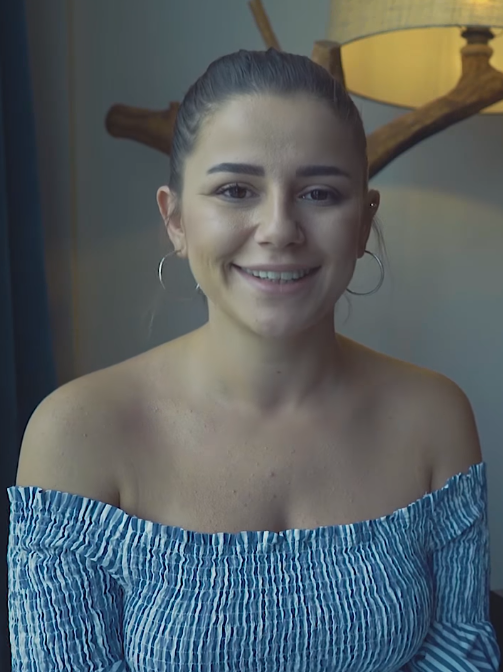
- Özbey in August 2017
- Born: 18 July 1988 (age 38); Istanbul, Turkey
- Education: Istanbul Technical University
- Occupation: Singer
- Spouse: Kenan Koçak (m. 2020)
- Children: 2
- Musical career
- Genres: Dance; pop
- Years active: 2013–present
- Labels: KNY; DMC

Merve Özbey (born 18 July 1988) is a Turkish singer and songwriter. Due to her collaborations with Erdem Kınay in the songs "Duman" and "Helal Ettim", she became famous in Turkey.

== Life and career ==
Merve Özbey was born on 18 July 1988 in Istanbul. Her family originate from Erzurum. She studied Turkish classical music in Istanbul Technical University. Singer Ebru Gündeş discovered Özbey's talent. While listening to her at Utku's concert, she liked her voice and asked Özbey to perform a few more songs and eventually took her as her own backing vocalist. Özbey subsequently became a backing vocalist for singers Demet Akalın, Bengü, Özcan Deniz, Ferman Toprak, Utku and Yaşar İpek. While she was working as a vocalist on Demet Akalın's new album she met Erdem Kınay. Kınay said that he was working on a new album and asked Özbey to collaborate with him. In 2012, Kınay's new album Proje was released and Özbey was featured on the song "Duman". The song became a massive hit and made Özbey well-known. In 2013, Kınay released the album Proje 2 and Özbey was featured on the song "Helal Ettim". After releasing a few songs with Kınay, Özbey decided to work on her first solo album.

In July 2015, Özbey's first album Yaş Hikayesi was released. A lead single with the same name was written by Deniz Erten and arranged by Erdem Kınay. The song became a number one hit on Türkçe Top 20. A second music video was also made for "Topsuz Tüfeksiz", followed by the album's third and final music video "Vicdanın Affetsin". In 2018, Özbey's name was among the artists whose names appeared in Yıldız Tilbe and Ahmet Selçuk İlkan's tribute albums. For these two albums, she performed the songs "Vuracak" and "Hani Bizim Sevdamız" respectively. Özbey's second album, Devran, was released in May 2019. A pop album, it featured elements of Arabesque and soul music. The album's first music video was prepared for the song "Tebrikler". The second music video was released for the song "Yaramızda Kalsın", written by Onur Can Özcan who had lost his life one year prior to the album's release in an accident.

== Discography ==
=== Albums ===
- Yaş Hikayesi (2015)
- Devran (2019)

=== Singles ===
- "Yerle Yeksan" (2021)
- "Kendine Dünya" (2021)
- "Kaptan" (feat. Emrah Karaduman) (2022)
- "Haram" (2022)
- "Sahi" (2023)
- "Bir İmkansız Var" (feat. Emrah Karaduman) (2023)
- "Zümrüdüankam" (2024)
- "Ne Olur" (feat. Bilal Sonses) (2024)
- "Bir Ateşe Attın Beni" (2025)
- "Geçsin Yıllar" (feat. Oğuzhan Koç) (2025)
- "Duramıyorum" (feat. Mustafa Ceceli) (2025)

=== As featured artist ===
Albums

- "Duman" from Proje (2012)
- "Helal Ettim" from Proje 2 (2013)
- "Yolun Sonu" from Musa Eroğlu ile Bir Asır (2015)
- "Vuracak" from Yıldız Tilbe'nin Yıldızlı Şarkıları (2018)
- "Hani Bizim Sevdamız" from Ahmet Selçuk İlkan Unutulmayan Şarkılar (2018)
- "Durum Çok Acil" from Piyanist 2 (2022)
- "Kararsın Dünyam" from Serdar Ortaç Şarkıları, Vol. 1 (2022)
- "Çilingir" from Söz Müzik Onur Can Özcan (2022)
- "Unuttun Beni Zalim" from Emel Şenocak'tan Yıldızlı Pekiyi (2023)

Singles

- "Boynun Borcu" (2017)

=== Music videos ===
- "Duman" (feat. Erdem Kınay)
- "Helal Ettim" (feat. Erdem Kınay)
- "Yaş Hikayesi"
- "Topsuz Tüfeksiz"
- "Vicdanın Affetsin"
- "Boynun Borcu"
- "Vuracak" (Yıldız Tilbe'nin Yıldızlı Şarkıları)
- "Hani Bizim Sevdamız" (Ahmet Selçuk İlkan Unutulmayan Şarkılar)
- "Tebrikler"
- "Yaramızda Kalsın"
- "Kül"
- "Kendine Dünya"
- "Durum Çok Acil" (with Sinan Akçıl and Mustafa Ceceli)
- "Çilingir"
- "Kaptan" (feat. Emrah Karaduman)
- "Kararsın Dünyam"
- "Haram"
- "Sahi"
- "Bir İmkansız Var" (feat. Emrah Karaduman)
- "Zümrüdüankam"
- "Ne Olur" (feat. Bilal Sonses)
- "Bir Ateşe Attın Beni"
- "Geçsin Yıllar" (feat. Oğuzhan Koç)
- "Duramıyorum" (feat. Mustafa Ceceli)
