= Burak King =

- Born: Burak Canatan; 17 May 1992 (age 34); Rotterdam, Netherlands
- Genre: Hip hop
- Occupations: Rapper; singer; songwriter
- Label: 3 Adım

Burak Canatan (born 17 May 1992), better known by his stage name Burak King, is a Turkish rapper, singer and songwriter.

== Career ==
King's song "Günah Benim" became widely known and resulted in his breakthrough. Through her children, Sibel Can learned about King's success and asked him and Eypio to perform at her concert in Cemil Topuzlu Open-Air Theatre. Together, they performed the song "Günah Benim" in the form of arabesque and rock. Before the concert Can said "I got to know Eypio and Burak King thanks to my children. Their music video has been watched over 100 million times. I'm so excited to rap for the first time".

UEFA's editor in Turkey Çetin Cem Yılmaz, revealed that the song "Günah Benim" was a favorite of their national football team being played on their bus numerous times. To support their team at the UEFA Euro 2016, King and Eypio used part of their previous song "Günah Benim" and released the new piece "Ay Bizim Yıldız Bizim".

In 2017, King released his new song "Koştum Hekime". The song became one of the most downloaded pieces in Turkey. King was nominated for a Golden Butterfly Award in the category :Song of the Year".

== Achievements ==
- 'Best Newcomer' – 43rd Golden Butterfly Awards (2016)
- 'Most Successful Song of the Year' "Günah Benim" – Istanbul Technical University Industrial Engineering Student Symposium (EMÖS) (2017)
- 'Best Lead Single of the Year' "Günah Benim" – Istanbul Gelisim University Media Awards (2017)
- 'Artist of the Year' – Mimar Sinan Fine Arts University Awards (2017)

== Discography ==
Albums

- Rap İçimden (2022)
- Aman Of (2023)

Singles

- Günah Benim (with Eypio) (2015)
- Sen (with Eypio) (2016)
- Ay Bizim Yıldız Bizim (with Eypio) (2016)
- Geceye mi Küssem? (with Patron) (2017)
- Koştum Hekime (2017)
- Yanıyoruz (2017)
- Var Git (2018)
- Sızı Kaldı (2019)
- Bi Sonu Var Mı? (2020)
- Paramparça (with Rafet El Roman) (2020)
- Eyvallah (with Rozz Kalliope) (2020)
- Gidesim Var (2020)
- Dünya (with Sokrat St) (2021)
- Rap İçimden (2021)
- Artık Zora Gelmiyorum (2021)
- Derde Çareler (2022)
- Bu Şehirde (with Nassa Nef) (2022)
- Hesap (with Tefo and Seko) (2022)
- Sıkıntı Yok Baba (with Sedat) (2022)
- Deli Deli (2022)
- Güle Güle (with Tefo and Seko) (2022)
- İstanbul (with Aleyna Kalaycıoğlu) (2023)
- Kalbim (with Rota) (2023)
- Dilber (with Ceren Sagu) (2024)
- Soluksuz (with Rota) (2024)
- Bi Sana (with Öykü Gürman) (2024)
- Bağımsız Bayrak (with Ahmet Çavuş) (2024)
- Beni Vur (with Ayazkardeş) (2024)
- Deli Rüzgar (with Can Togrulca) (2024)
- Bize Ne Kaldı (2024)
- Çileden (with Sarkopenya) (2024)
- Güle Güle (Afro) (with Seda Üren) (2025)
- Sessizlere Verdim (2025)
- Ben Hala Sana Deliyim (with Tamer Erten) (2025)
- Niye Niye (with Serdar Ortaç) (2025)
