= Bilal Sonses =

Turkish pop music singer-songwriter (born 1993)

- Born: 28 October 1993 (age 32); Fatih, Istanbul, Turkey
- Genres: Pop, hip hop, arabesque
- Occupation: Singer-songwriter
- Labels: DMC

Bilal Sonses (born 28 October 1993) is a Turkish pop music singer-songwriter of Kurdish origin.

== Life and career ==
Sonses was born in Fatih, Istanbul. He is originally from Adıyaman and is of Kurdish origin. He is a graduate of Mehmet İhsan Mermerci Tourism Hotel Management High School. After completing his high school education, he continued his education with a 2-year associate degree program at Çanakkale Onsekiz Mart University. As of 2019, he continues his undergraduate education at Düzce University.

Bilal lost his father in a traffic accident when he was very young.

Sonses opened his own YouTube channel in 2015, performing cover versions of famous songs. Soon he became popular with the public and the channel garnered 1 million subscribers over a short period of time. Sonses, who writes and composes his own songs, has released duets with various artists and provided fellow singers with new songs and pieces. On 12 November 2020, he released a duet with Yıldız Tilbe, titled Hasbelkader, the lyrics for which were written by Sonses. The song's music video garnered over one hundred and fifty million views on YouTube. he is the son of artist Mehmet Sonses.

== Discography ==
=== EPs ===
- Öpesim Var (2017)

=== Singles ===
- "İnat Keçi" (2019)
- "İçimden Gelmiyor" (ft. Bengü) (2019)
- "Sevme" (2019)
- "Sen Aldırma" (ft. Reynmen) (2019)
- "Neyim Olacaktın?" (2019)
- "Cennetten Çiçek" (2019)
- "Sende Kaldı Yüreğim" (ft. Derya Bedavacı) (2020)
- "Sonu Gelmez" (ft. Seda Tripkolic) (2020)
- "Yara" (ft. Ziynet Sali) (2020)
- "Görmedim Sen Gibi" (2020)
- "Nefret" (2020)
- "Geç Değil" (ft. Rozz Kalliope) (2020)
- "Çat Kapı" (2020)
- "Hasbelkader" (ft. Yıldız Tilbe) (2020)
- "Sebepsiz Boş Yere" (2021)
- "Şimdiki Aklım" (2021)
- "Dayanırım" (ft. Arda Han) (2021)
- "Bu Aşkta Zararım Var" (2021)
- "Söz Verdim" (2021)
- "Geçmişi Araladım" (2021)
- "Dağlar (Acoustic)" (2022)
- "Bir Kulum İşte (Acoustic)" (2022)
- "Dön Diyemem" (2022)
- "Olmuyor" (2022)
- "Başa Sar" (2022)
- "Ardından" (2023)
- "Şekerparem" (2023)
- "Aşkından Yanayım Mı?" (from the album Hürmet 2) (2023)
- "Cereyan" (2023)
- "İki Kadeh" (2023)
- "İyi Değilim" (2023)
- "Yapma" (ft. Şehzade) (2024)
- "Sevdam" (ft. Zehra) (2024)
- "Tavrına Hayran" (ft. Reynmen) (2024)
- "Cellat" (2024)
- "Karlı Bahar" (ft. Aynur Polat) (2024)
- "Dayanamam Asla" (2024)
- "Ne Olur" (ft. Merve Özbey) (2024)
- "Bu Aşk" (2025)
- "Sen Mi Ben Mi?" (ft. Deniz Toprak) (2025)
- "Diyemedim Elveda" (ft. Çağın) (2025)
- "Çek Git" (2025)
- "Sersem" (2025)
- "Bir Gece Vardın" (ft. Shawty) (2025)
- "Dönmüş Devran" (ft. RETROBESK) (2025)

== Songs written and composed by Sonses ==
- Ece Seçkin – "Sen Hala Ordasın"
- Murat Boz – "Can Kenarım"
- Ebru Yaşar – "Kalmam"
- Mustafa Ceceli – "Bedel"
- Reynmen – "Hevesim Yok"
- Mustafa Ceceli ft. JİNE – "İmtiyaz"
- Bengü – "Kimse Bilmesin"
- İrem Derici – "Ara Sıra"
- Alişan – "Dön Hadi"

* The list above includes songs given to other artists whose lyrics or music belong to Sonses. He has performed songs that are written and composed by himself but are not mentioned in this list.

== Awards ==
Year	Award	Category	Result
2019	Fizy Music Awards	Most Streamed Duet	Won
