= Arabesk (airline alliance) =

Former unofficial and non-binding airline alliance

Arabesk Network Cooperation Project
- Company type: Network alignment project
- Industry: Aviation
- Founded: 2006

Arabesk Network Cooperation Project was a "network alignment project", an unofficial and non-binding airline alliance, comprising members of Arab Air Carriers' Organization (AACO).

This network alignment group was founded in 2006, after a year of preparation with technical assistance from Sabre Airline Solutions, by the following airlines:

Airline	Notes
(Egypt) EgyptAir	A Star Alliance member
(United Arab Emirates) Etihad Airways	
(Bahrain) Gulf Air	
(Lebanon) Middle East Airlines	A SkyTeam member
(Jordan) Royal Jordanian	A oneworld member
(Saudi Arabia) Saudia	A SkyTeam member
(Syria) Syrian Air	
(Tunisia) Tunisair	
(Yemen) Yemenia	

In 2007, Etihad Airways and Syrian Air joined the alliance.

The project aimed to boost market share and coordinate schedules, reduce duplication on routes and link the destinations network of its members, which stretched from North America to East Asia. At that time, Arab airline operators were generally not included in the major airline alliances, partly because of their relatively small market share.

As well as coordinating schedules, the Arabesk carriers consolidated joint fuel purchasing under the AACO umbrella, and other supplies. Abdul Wahab Teffaha, Secretary General of AACO, explained, “This is not an airline alliance, but a unique grouping of carriers from a single region designed to help members realise better commercial potential, through schedule coordination.”

The project continued until the end of the decade.
