= Mahmut Kandemir =

Electrical engineer

Mahmut Taylan Kandemir
- Education: Syracuse University (PhD); Istanbul Technical University(M.S, B.S)
- Scientific career
- Fields: Computer Architecture, Compiler
- Workplaces: Penn State University
- Doctoral advisor: Alok Choudhary
- Notable students: Chun-Yi Liu; Xulong Tang; Shulin Zhao

Mahmut Taylan Kandemir is a professor in the School of Electrical Engineering and Computer Science at Penn State University. He got his PhD degree from Syracuse University. He is a member of the Microsystems Design Lab. Dr. Kandemir's research interests are in optimizing compilers, runtime systems, mobile systems, embedded systems, I/O and high performance storage, non volatile processors and memory, and latest trends in public cloud services.

He is the author of more than 150 journal publications and over 650 conference/workshop papers in these areas. He graduated 32 Ph.D. and 20 masters students so far, and is currently advising/coadvising 15 Ph.D. students and 5 masters students. He served in the program committees of 40 conferences and workshops. He is a member of Hall of Fame for conferences such as MICRO, ISCA and HPCA . His research is/was funded by NSF, DOE, DARPA, SRC, Intel and Microsoft. He is a recipient of NSF Career Award and the Penn State Premier Research Award. He is a Fellow of IEEE. Between 2008-2012 and 2017, he served as the Graduate Coordinator of the Computer Science and Engineering Department at Penn State. He was named a Fellow of the Institute of Electrical and Engineers (IEEE) in 2016 for his contributions to compiler support for performance and energy optimization of computer architectures.
