= Arabesque (Sibel Can album) =

2016 album by Sibel Can

Studio album by Sibel Can
- Released: 22 April 2016
- Genre: Arabesque
- Length: 1:01:47
- Label: DMC

Sibel Can chronology
| Galata (2014) | Arabesque (2016) | Yeni Aşkım (2018) |

Arabesque is the twenty first album by the Turkish singer Sibel Can. It was released on 22 April 2016 by DMC.

== Release and content ==
Can said of the album, "I think there's an arabesque part that everyone's hiding in a corner of their heart. I grew up with full arabesque songs. I've always dreamed of performing those songs. When Tatlıses was singing them I would say to myself that I would definitely perform them myself as a female singer. There are also songs by Müslüm Gürses in the album." She also discussed the song "Gurbet Geceleri", originally performed by Bülent Ersoy, and said: "I cried while listening to that song from Bülent Ersoy."

The release date of the album was to have been 29 April. On April 16, when the songs were leaked on YouTube, the date was brought forward to 22 April. Commenting on the album's leak on the Internet, Can said, "I really felt sorry to see our work of months being wasted away like this. I ask all my listeners to be sensitive about respecting art and the work of an artist." About changing the release date to 22 April, she said, "Ten days ago we had an unfortunate incident because of labor thieves. With the effort of lawyers, we blocked access to the channel that improperly broadcast our songs. The album is in the market today."

In April, Zara released an Arabesque album, titled Derin Aşk 2, and seven of the songs in it were the same as the ones performed by Can in her album ("Benim Hayatım", "Seni Yazdım Kalbime", "Sevmek", "Dertli Dertli", "Yalnızım", "Mutlu Ol Yeter" and "Hasret Rüzgarları"). Can later commented on having the same seven songs as Zara in her album and said, "We don't get into polemics because of the manners we learned from our great artist. We only practice our art. Zara has a peaceful voice. I love her so much."

== Track listing ==
Arabesque
| No. | Title | Writer(s) | Composer(s) | Length |
|---|---|---|---|---|
| 1. | "Benim Hayatım" | Şakir Askan | Burhan Bayar | 4:56 |
| 2. | "Seninle İlk Defa" | Mehmet Tahir Paker | Bayar | 3:27 |
| 3. | "Sevmek" | Paker | Bayar | 3:56 |
| 4. | "Bu da Geçer" | Hamza Dekeli | Bayar | 2:52 |
| 5. | "Solmadan Gel" | Hasan Bağlan | Bayar | 4:11 |
| 6. | "Gülüm Benim" | Askan | Bayar | 3:55 |
| 7. | "Yalnızım" | Paker | Bayar | 5:23 |
| 8. | "Mavi Mavi" | Bayar · Yılmaz Tatlıses | Bayar | 3:40 |
| 9. | "Mutlu Ol Yeter" | Paker | Bayar | 4:16 |
| 10. | "Hasret Rüzgarları" | Askan | Bayar | 5:14 |
| 11. | "Dertli Dertli" | Gönül Şen | Bayar | 3:30 |
| 12. | "Gurbet Geceleri" | Askan | Bayar | 4:38 |
| 13. | "Bir Kulunu Çok Sevdim" | Fethi Demir | Bayar | 4:38 |
| 14. | "Mavi Mavi" (Remix) | Bayar · Tatlıses | Bayar | 3:35 |
| 15. | "Gülüm Benim" (Remix) | Askan | Bayar | 3:36 |
| Total length: | | | | 1:01:47 |

== Release history ==
| Country | Date | Format(s) | Label |
|---|---|---|---|
| Turkey | 22 April 2016 | CD · Digital download | DMC |
| Worldwide | 22 April 2016 | Digital download | DMC |
