= Eypio =

Turkish rapper

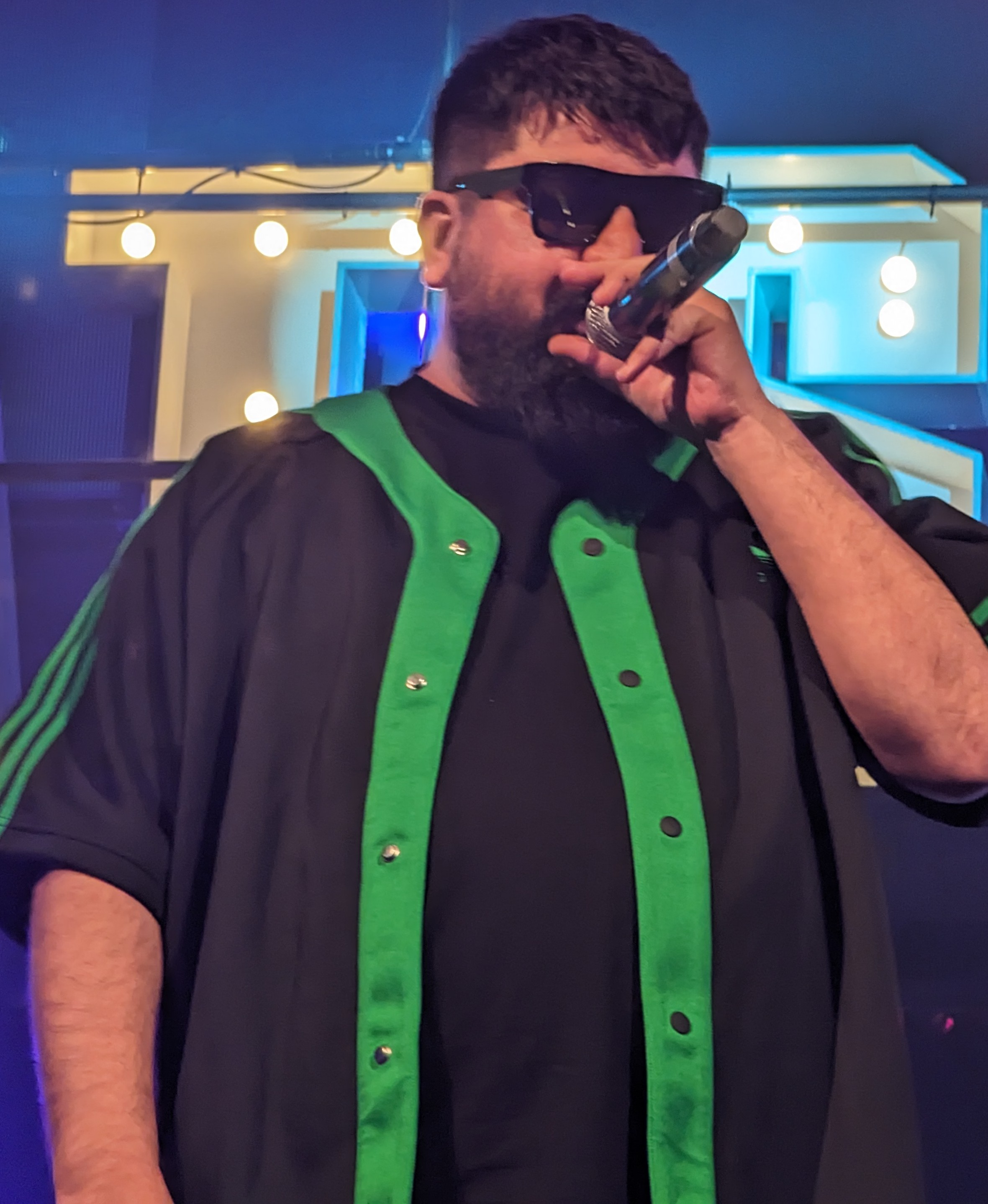
- Eypio in 2024

Background information
- Also known as: A.P.O; Abdurhyme
- Born: Abdurrahim Akça; 2 February 1983 (age 43); Konya, Turkey
- Genres: Hip hop
- Occupations: Rapper; singer; songwriter
- Years active: 2002–present
- Labels: 3 Adım; DMC

Abdurrahim Akça (born 2 February 1983), better known by his stage name Eypio, is a Turkish rapper, singer and songwriter.

== Early life and career ==
Eypio was born to an Afghan Turkmen migrant family. He has been active in music industry since 2002, founded his own studio in June 2009. Eypio records some of his songs in his own studio but some of his works have been produced by other production companies. His studio provides information on rap music and rap for new rappers. In 2013, he changed his stage name from A.P.O. to Eypio. In 2013, his song "Ayrım Yok" was made into a music video. In 2014, new clips were made for his songs "Kral Çıplak" and "Ay Kızım" form the album Beton Duvar. On 24 December 2015, the music video of his song with Burak King titled "Günah Benim" was released on YouTube, a video which has more than 230 million views. He later began working on his new album. On 17 June 2016, together with Burak King, he published a piece for the national team titled "Ay Bizim Yıldız Bizim". On 1 July 2016, his album Günah Benim was released.

== Discography ==
=== Albums ===
- 2005 - A.P.O - (EP)
- 2006 - Rap Fabriek - (1st Studio album)
- 2007 - Hırsız Var - (2nd Studio album)
- 2008 - Apollo - (3rd Studio album)
- 2011 - AbduRhyme - (4th Studio album)
- 2012 - 16:34 - (5th Studio album)
- 2014 - Beton Duvar - (6th Studio album)
- 2016 - Günah Benim - (7th Studio album)
- 2020 - Urgan - (8th studio album)
- 2023 - Bi Taksi Çağırın - (9th studio album)

=== Music videos ===
- 2013 - Ayrım Yok
- 2014 - Kral Çıplak
- 2015 - Ay Kızım
- 2015 - Günah Benim
- 2018 - Bura Anadolu (Direniş Karatay Film Music)
- 2018 - Reset (duet with Mustafa Sandal, directed by Tunç Topçuoglu)
- 2018 - Kaşık (Kafalar Karışık Film Music)
- 2019 - Vur Vur (directed by Tunç Topçuoglu)
- 2019 - Umudum Kalmadı
- 2019 - Naim
- 2020 - Katliam 4
- 2020 - Urgan
- 2021 - Seni Öptüğüm Sokak (duet with Tuğçe Kandemir)
- 2021 - Bizim Çocuklar (duet with Mustafa Sandal, Derya Uluğ & Irmak Arıcı)
- 2022 - Yan (duet with Arem Özgüç & Arman Aydın)
- 2022 - Anakonda (duet with Faruk Sabancı)
- 2022 - Ay Kızım (duet with Nigar Muharrem)
- 2022 - Git Dedim (duet with Forte)
- 2022 - Can't Touch This (duet with Kezzo)
- 2023 - Seviyor (duet with Umut Timur)
- 2023 - Vurgun (duet with Didar Nurberdiyew)
- 2023 - Sen Oyna (duet with Kibariye & Tuğberk Işık)
- 2024 - Kocaman (duet with Tepki)
- 2024 - İmdadım (duet with Zara)
- 2024 - Sabah Olmadan (duet with Güllü)
- 2024 - Dümtek (duet with Denisa)
- 2024 - Erik Dalı (Eller Oynasın) (duet with Asena)
- 2025 - Kalbini Verdin
- 2025 - Bana Sor (duet with Yener Çevik)
- 2025 - Bizim Araba
- 2025 - Eller Oynasın (Erik Dalı) (duet with Asena İrmikci)
- 2025 - Korkum Bundan (duet with Tuğçe Kandemir)
- 2025 - Filistin
- 2025 - İtirazım Var (duet with Zerrin Özer)

== Awards and nominations ==
Year	Award	Category	Result
2016	43rd Golden Butterfly Awards	Best Newcomer	Won
