= Aleyna Tilki =

Turkish singer (born 2000)

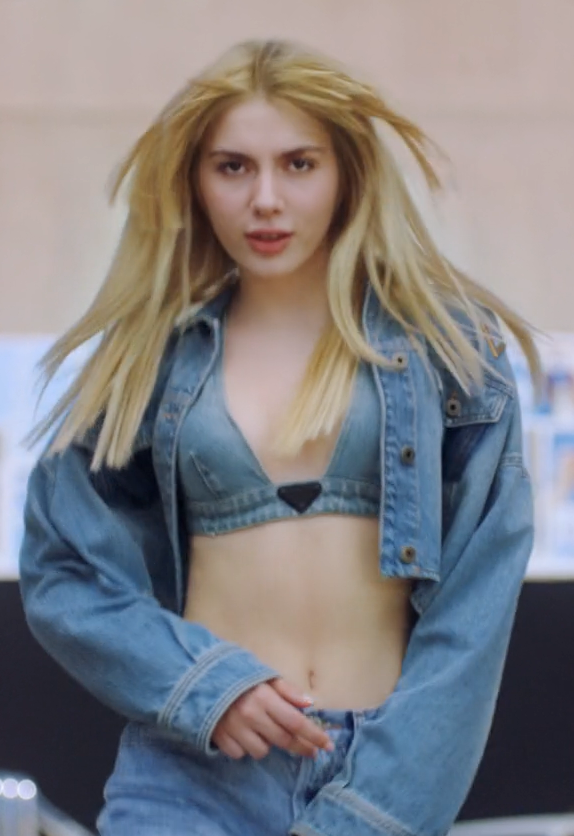
- Tilki in 2021

Background information
- Born: March 28, 2000 (age 26); Konya, Turkey
- Genres: Pop; electropop; dance-pop
- Occupations: Singer; songwriter; actress
- Years active: 2014–present
- Labels: DMC; Warner
- Website: https://aleynatilki.com.tr/

Aleyna Tilki (born March 28, 2000) is a Turkish singer and songwriter.

== Life and career ==
Tilki was born in Konya on March 28, 2000. Her father is also from Konya. Her paternal family is of either Turkic or Caucasian descent who immigrated from Caucasus. Her mother is from Of, Trabzon. Her sister Ayça Tilki is a singer and actress.

At the age of fourteen, she was a semi-finalist on the sixth season of Yetenek Sizsiniz Türkiye (Turkish version of the Got Talent series). She caught public attention because of Turkish folk song "Gesi Bağları" was covered as Anatolian rock, which fuses Turkish folk music and rock, on the show. Aleyna Tilki has received critical acclaim for her voice style like pop singers Sertab Erener, Gülçin Ergül, Burcu Güneş, Zeynep Casalini, Atiye, Hadise, Aynur Aydın, and Şebnem Keskin.

She achieved national recognition after the release of her song "Cevapsız Çınlama" along with its music video, which has more than 600 million views on YouTube. It is considered the most viewed Turkish music video on YouTube. The song went up to No. 2 on the Turkey's Trending List. Aleyna Tilki released her first solo single "Sen Olsan Bari" in July 2017 which became number 1 in Turkey's charts. The music video currently has over 500 million views on YouTube.

Tilki temporarily left Turkey to complete English language training and settled in Los Angeles in November 2017. In November 2019, it was announced that she was in negotiations with Warner Music for producing a new album and four singles. This would make her the first Turkish singer ever to work with this company.

In 2020, she agreed on a series of projects on the digital platform Exxen, owned by Acun Ilıcalı. The series shares the similar name as her song "İşte Bu Benim Masalım". She shared the lead roles with Cemal Can Canseven in the series, which premiered in 2021.

== Discography ==
=== Non-album singles ===
| Title | Year |
|---|---|
| "Sen Olsan Bari" | 2017 |
| "Nasılsın Aşkta" | 2019 |
| "Yalan" | 2020 |
| "Bu Benim Masalım" | 2020 |
| "Retrograde" | 2021 |
| "Sır" | 2021 |
| "Take It or Leave It" | 2022 |
| "Aşk Ateşi" | 2022 |
| "Tanırım İntiharı" | 2022 |
| "Başıma Belasın" | 2023 |
| "Bedel" | 2024 |
| "Sultanım" | 2024 |
| "Hoşuna Gidiyo" | 2024 |
| "Bekleyenim" | 2024 |
| "Kayboldum Masalında" | 2025 |

=== Soundtracks ===
| Title | Film/TV series | Year |
|---|---|---|
| "Nehir" | İşte Bu Benim Masalım | 2021 |
| "Trol" (with Ayça Tilki) | İşte Bu Benim Masalım | 2021 |
| "Kabus" | İşte Bu Benim Masalım | 2021 |

=== Performances in movies and commercials ===
| Title (except cover songs) | Film/TV series | Year |
|---|---|---|
| "Gitme" | (only demo) | 2019 |
| "Yok Sırlarım" | İşte Bu Benim Masalım | 2021 |
| "Dans Et" | İşte Bu Benim Masalım | 2021 |
| "Geçer Mi" | İşte Bu Benim Masalım | 2021 |
| "Delibozuk" | İşte Bu Benim Masalım | 2021 |
| "Kim Derdi" | İşte Bu Benim Masalım | 2021 |
| "Benim Aşkım Kimmiş" | İşte Bu Benim Masalım | 2021 |
| "Kalbimde" | İşte Bu Benim Masalım | 2021 |
| "Perde" | İşte Bu Benim Masalım | 2021 |
| "Masum Değil" | İşte Bu Benim Masalım | 2021 |
| "Hayalimden Yapılmışım" | İşte Bu Benim Masalım | 2021 |
| "Bi' Kapışma Var Şimdi" | Dimes (commercial) | 2021 |
| "Beni Kendinden Çok Sev" | (short film) | 2023 |

=== As featured artist ===
| Title | Artist | Year | Album |
|---|---|---|---|
| "Cevapsız Çınlama" | Emrah Karaduman | 2016 | Single |
| "Dipsiz Kuyum" | Emrah Karaduman | 2018 | BombarDuman |
| "Sevmek Yok" | Emrah Karaduman | 2018 | BombarDuman |
| "Real Love" | Dillon Francis | 2021 | Happy Machine |
| "Diamonds" | Jubël | 2022 | Single |
| "Bir Gün Ol Yerimde" | Doğu Swag | 2023 | Single |
| "Küçük Sevgilim" | mor ve ötesi, Edis | 2025 | Saygı1 |
| "Ishara" | Kiss Facility | 2026 | Khazna |

=== Tribute songs ===
| Title | Artist | Year | Album |
|---|---|---|---|
| "Yalnız Çiçek" | Emrah Karaduman | 2018 | Yıldız Tilbe'nin Yıldızlı Şarkıları |
| "Sen Affetsen Ben Affetmem" | Taksim Trio | 2022 | Single |
| "Yaz Yaz Yaz" | Mor ve Ötesi | 2023 | Single |
| "Ayrı Gitme" | Serdar Ortaç | 2023 | Serdar Ortaç Şarkıları Vol. 2 |
| "Kalamış Parkı" | Kargo | 2024 | Kargo Yarına Kalan Şarkılar |
| "Sana Güvenmiyorum" | Dedublüman | 2024 | Dedub Sessions |

=== Remix ===
| Title | Year |
|---|---|
| "Retrograde (Galantis Remix)" | 2021 |
| "Retrograde (Vintage Culture Remix)" | 2021 |
| "Real Love (Valentino Khan Remix)" | 2022 |
| "Real Love (Shelco Garcia & Teenwolf Remix)" | 2022 |
| "Real Love (Sak Noel & Salvi & Franklin Dam Remix)" | 2022 |

== Filmography ==
Television

| Year | Title | Role | Notes |
|---|---|---|---|
| 2014 | Yetenek Sizsiniz Türkiye | Herself | Contestant |
| 2016 | O Ses Türkiye | Herself | Guest performer |
| 2018 | Survivor | Herself | Guest performer |
| 2021 | İşte Bu Benim Masalım | Aleyna | Main Role |
| 2023 | İbo Show | Herself | Guest performer |

Commercials

- Fuse Tea (2018)
- Loft (2018)
- Cornetto (2019–2020)
- Dimes (2021)
- Puma (2022)

== Awards and nomination ==
| Year | Award | Category | Nominee | Result | Ref. |
|---|---|---|---|---|---|
| 2016 | Radio Aydın Music Awards | Duet of the Year | "Cevapsız Çınlama" | Won | |
| 2017 | Golden Butterfly Awards | Best Newcomer | Herself | Won | |
| 2017 | Golden Butterfly Awards | Best Music Video | "Sen Olsan Bari" | Nominated | |
| 2017 | Golden Butterfly Awards | Song of the Year | "Sen Olsan Bari" | Nominated | |
| 2018 | Fizy Music Awards | Best Newcomer | Herself | Won | |
| 2018 | Fizy Music Awards | Best Music Video | "Sen Olsan Bari" | Won | |
| 2018 | Golden Butterfly Awards | Best Female Pop Artist | Herself | Won | |
| 2020 | Golden Butterfly Awards | Best Female Singer | Herself | Nominated | |
| 2021 | Head & Shoulders Number1 Video Music Awards | Best Female Artist | Herself | Won | |
| 2021 | Head & Shoulders Number1 Video Music Awards | Song of the Year | "Retrograde" | Nominated | |
| 2021 | Head & Shoulders Number1 Video Music Awards | Best TV Soundtrack | "İşte Bu Benim Masalım (Nehir)" | Nominated | |
| 2022 | Head & Shoulders Number1 Video Music Awards | Best Female Artist | Herself | Won | |
