= Volkan Konak =

Turkish folk singer (1967–2025)

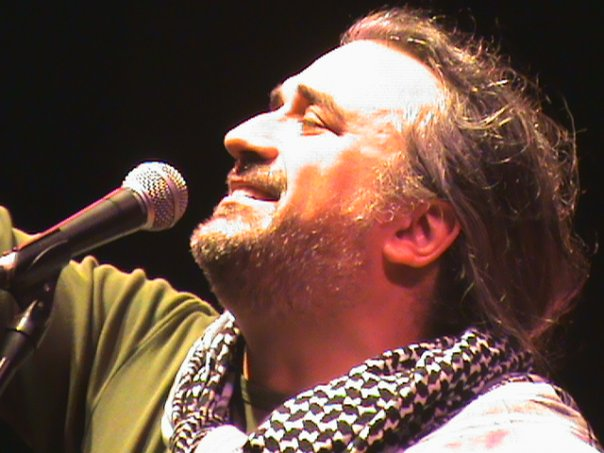
- Konak in 2009

Background information
- Born: 27 February 1967; Maçka, Trabzon, Turkey
- Died: 31 March 2025 (aged 58) Famagusta, Turkish Republic of North Cyprus
- Genres: Folk
- Occupation: Singer
- Years active: 1989–2025
- Spouse: Selma Konak (m. 1992)
- Website: http://www.volkankonak.com

Volkan Konak (27 February 1967 – 31 March 2025) was a Turkish folk singer from the eastern Black Sea. His song "Cerrahpaşa" was a great success and his album, Mora, released in 2006, was awarded a gold plaque by the Turkish recording producers association, MÜ-YAP.

== Early life ==
Konak was born in 1967 in the village of Yeşilyurt in the Maçka district of Trabzon. After completing his primary, secondary and high school education in Maçka, he entered the Istanbul Technical University Turkish Music State Conservatory in 1983 with the encouragement of his teacher. He graduated from the conservatory in 1988 and started his master's degree in Social Sciences on folk music at Istanbul Technical University in the same year. He completed his master's degree in 1991.

== Career ==
Konak started his musical life in 1989 with an album named Suların Horon Yeri, based on a compilation of works from the Maçka region. Later, he started to compose his own music, often inspired by the works of poets such as Nâzım Hikmet, Yaşar Miraç, Ömer Kayaoğlu, Sunay Akın and Sabahattin Ali. By incorporating ethnic motifs into his compositions, he created hiw own unique style.

Reshaping Black Sea music by combining it with universal music forms, Konak composed Efulim in 1993. Then in October 1994, he released the album Gel Misiniz Benimle (Will you come with me?). After completing his military service, he immediately started work on his third album Volkanik Parçalar which was completed after three months. In April 1998, Konak completed his album Pedaliza with Kuzey Müzik Production, a company he founded himself.

From 1993, he performed about fifty of his compositions in his albums and, as a result, was selected as artist of the year by the Association of Journalists and other foundations and associations. In 1997, he was named "The Best Music Artist of the Year" by Politika magazine. In 1993 the world rights to one of Konak's compositions were purchased by the French producer Alain Finet. From 1998, he also started to sing folk songs from Central Anatolia, Eastern Anatolia, the Aegean and Cyprus alongside his more familiar Black Sea songs.

In 2000, he released his album Şimal Rüzgarı on DMC, following it up after a 3.5-year hiatus, with Maranda, also on the DMC label. In 2006, he released Mora which included the song "Gardaş", in memory of Kazım Koyuncu. with lyrics written by his sister Nuran Bahçekapılı. Konak also wrote many poems and at his concerts used to recite from other poets as well as entertaining his audience with his humorous stories.

Having carried out two years of research into the Chernobyl disaster, he compiled and documented the effects of this disaster on Turkey and especially on the Black Sea Region. Konak, who lost many of his relatives, including his father, to cancer, and always felt the pain of this, composed "Cerrahpaşa", with lyrics again written by his sister, for his father. For years, Konak sought to draw attention to the increase in cancer cases in the Black Sea Region and fought for the establishment of a Cancer Research Hospital in the region.

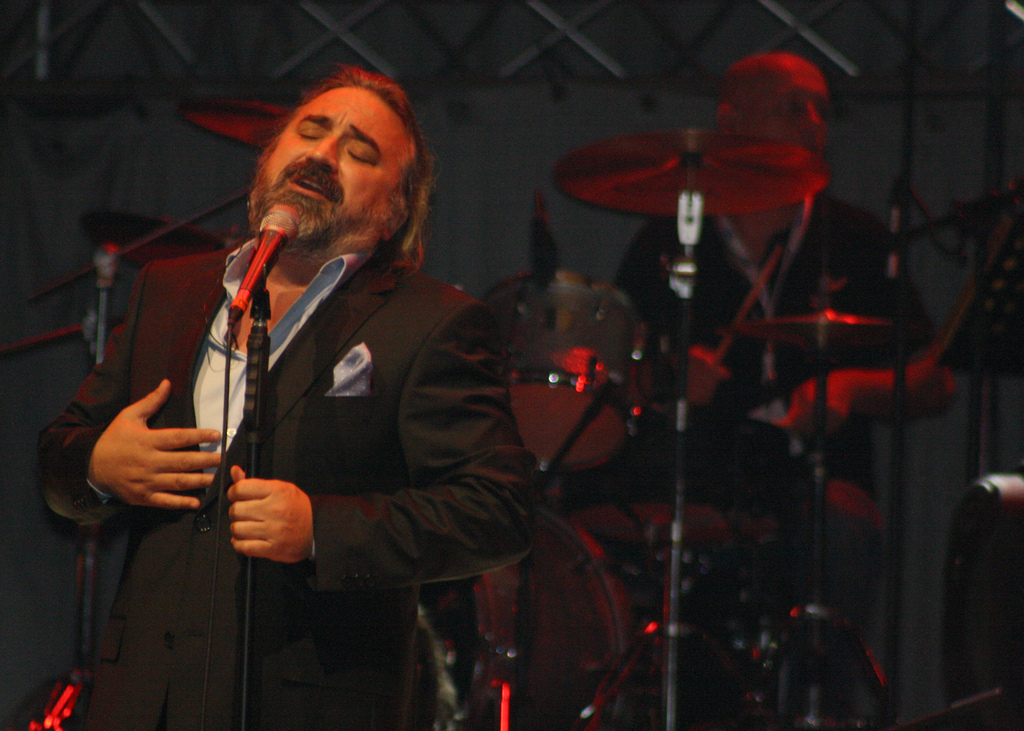
Konak in 2011

In 2009, Konak released a new album entitled Mimoza and shot several videos for it. In the same year, he revealed that he was neither Greek nor Laz in an interview.

In 2012, he released his album Lifor and shot several videos for it

== Death ==
In the late evening of 30 March 2025, Konak suffered a medical emergency and collapsed while on stage; he died early the next day, at the age of 58. Large crowds attended his funeral in Maçka.

== Albums ==
- 1989: Suların Horon Yeri
- 1993: Efulim
- 1994: Gelir misin Benimle?
- 1996: Volkanik Parçalar
- 1998: Pedaliza
- 2000: Şimal Rüzgarı
- 2003: Maranda
- 2006: Mora
- 2009: Mimoza
- 2012: Lifor
- 2015: Manolya
- 2017: Klasikler 1
- 2019: Dalya
