= Fizy =

Music streaming platform based in Turkey

fizy
- Website type: Streaming music, search engine
- Available in: Turkish, English and Ukrainian
- Owner: Turkcell
- Founder: Ercan Yaris
- Website: fizy.com
- Commercial: Yes
- Registration: Optional
- Launched: 22 December 2008; 17 years ago
- Current status: Active (available in Turkey)

fizy is a Turkey-based music streaming and digital music platform which provides unlimited access to the content catalogs of distributors including Sony Music, Warner Music, The Orchard, Universal, Believe Digital, DMC, Avrupa Müzik, Beggars Group, Eğlence Fabrikası, Fuga, Eveara and Ingrooves. It is available on a number of operating systems and platforms including iOS, Android, Web Player (play.fizy.com), TV+, Apple TV, Apple CarPlay and Sonos.

== History ==
fizy was founded by Ercan Yaris on 22 December 2008. The music platform immediately reached millions and was listed by The New York Times among the "top three must-try web sites in the new year". fizy was founded when music streaming was becoming popular and attracted attention thanks to its ease of use and neat design. In January 2011, it was recognized as the "World's Best Music Service" at Mashable Awards.

Turkish Phonographic Industry Society (MÜYAP) sued fizy for allowing access to music without any royalty payments. On 28 December 2010, Beyoğlu Court ruled in favor of MÜYAP and restricted access to fizy.

fizy was back in business in April 2011. Ercan Yaris sold 40% of his shares to an interactive as agency named ReklamZ. The company was them sold to Turkcell. After the acquisition by Turkcell, fizy went through some significant change. As of today, more than 35 million songs are available on fizy.

fizy started again under Turkcell and is now among the leading music platforms in Turkey. The limited version is globally available for download and paid or free subscription models are available in Turkey, Germany, Ukraine, Belarus and Northern Cyprus.
