= Tarkan discography =

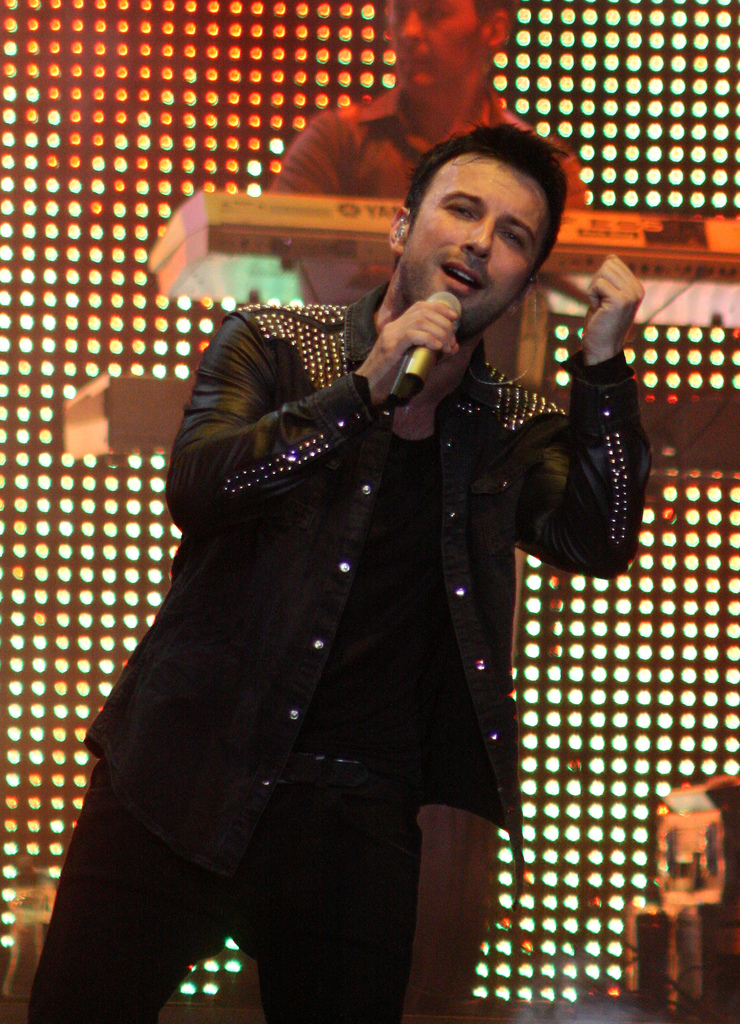
- Studio albums: 8
- Extended plays: 1
- Soundtrack albums: 6
- Compilation albums: 2
- Tribute albums: 5
- Singles: 13
- Music videos: 53
- Promo: 9

This is the discography for Turkish singer, composer, lyricist, and dancer Tarkan.

== Albums ==
=== Studio albums ===
Title	Album details	Charts			Sales
Title	Album details	AUT	GER	SWI	Sales
Yine Sensiz	Released: December 26, 1992; Label: Istanbul Plak; Format: CD, cassette, digital download	—	—	—	Turkey: 900,000
Aacayipsin	Released: May 22, 1994; Label: Istanbul Plak; Format: CD, cassette, digital download	—	—	—	Turkey: 2,500,000; Europe: 950,000
Ölürüm Sana	Released: July 5, 1997; Label: Istanbul Plak; Format: CD, cassette, digital download	—	—	—	Turkey: 1,500,000
Karma	Released: July 26, 2001; Label: Istanbul Plak, Hitt Music; Format: CD, cassette, digital download	—	—	—	
Come Closer	Released: April 6, 2006; Label: Istanbul Plak, Hitt Music; Format: CD, cassette, digital download	50	18	43	
Metamorfoz	Released: December 26, 2007; Label: DMC; Format: CD, cassette, digital download	—	—	—	Turkey: 350,000
Adımı Kalbine Yaz	Released: July 28, 2010; Label: DMC, Hitt Music; Format: CD, digital download	—	—	—	Turkey: 355,000
10	Released: June 15, 2017; Label: Hitt Music; Format: CD, digital download	—	—	72	Turkey: 350,000
Kuantum 51	Released: June 14, 2024; Label: Hitt Music; Format: Digital download	—	—	—	

=== Compilation albums ===
Title	Album details	Charts			Sales
Title	Album details	AUT	GER	SWI	Sales
Tarkan	Released: 1998; Label: Format: CD, cassette, digital download	22	7	17	
Ahde Vefa	Released: March 11, 2016; Label: Hitt Music; Format: CD, digital download	—	—	—	Turkey: 272,500

=== Remix albums ===
Title	Album details	Sales
Yine Sensiz (Extended Mix)	Released: 2003; Label: Format: CD, cassette, digital download	
Metamorfoz Remixes (Extended Mix)	Released: 2008; Label: Format: CD, cassette, digital download	Turkey: 35,500

== EP ==
Title	EP details	Sales
Dudu	Released: 2003; Label: Istanbul Plak, Hitt Music; Format: CD, cassette, digital download	World: 1,000,000

== Music videos ==
Music video list, year of publication and directors
Year	Video	Album	Director(s)
1992	"Kıl Oldum"	"Yine Sensiz"	Mert Özmen
1992	"Kimdi?"	"Yine Sensiz"	Cumhur Atalay
1992	"Kimdi?" (version 2)	"Yine Sensiz"	Metin Arolat
1993	"Gelip De Halimi Gördün Mü?"	"Yine Sensiz"	—N/a
1993	"Vazgeçemem"	"Yine Sensiz"	Metin Arolat
1993	"Vazgeçemem" (version 2)	"Yine Sensiz"	Metin Arolat
1993	"Vazgeçemem" (version 3)	"Yine Sensiz"	Metin Arolat
1993	"Söz Verdim"	"Yine Sensiz"	—N/a
1993	"Selam Ver"	"Yine Sensiz"	Kemal Başbuğ
1993	"Sarıl Bana"	"Yine Sensiz"	—N/a
1993	"Çok Ararsın Beni"	"Yine Sensiz"	—N/a
1993	"Çok Ararsın Beni" (version 2)	"Yine Sensiz"	—N/a
1994	"Hepsi Senin Mi?"	"Aacayipsin"	Metin Arolat
1994	"Hepsi Senin Mi?" (version 2)	"Aacayipsin"	Hazım Başaran
1994	"Unutmamalı"	"Aacayipsin"	Hazım Başaran
1994	"Gül Döktüm Yollarına"	"Aacayipsin"	—N/a
1994	"Bekle"	"Aacayipsin"	—N/a
1995	"Kış Güneşi"	"Aacayipsin"	Umur Turagay
1995	"Şeytan Azapta"	"Aacayipsin"	Şule Bekiroğlu
1995	"Dön Bebeğim"	"Aacayipsin"	Abdullah Oğuz
1997	"Yeni Yıl Şarkısı"	"Yeni Yıl"	—N/a
1997	"Şımarık"	"Ölürüm Sana"	—N/a
1997	"İkimizin Yerine"	"Ölürüm Sana"	Mete Özgencil
1998	"Salına Salına Sinsice"	"Ölürüm Sana"	Metin Arolat
1998	"Ölürüm Sana"	"Ölürüm Sana"	Umur Turagay
1998	"Şımarık" (version 2)	"Tarkan"	Emmanuel Saada
1998	"Şıkıdım"	"Tarkan"	Yannick Saillet
1999	"Bu Gece (Kır Zincirlerini)"	"Tarkan"	Yannick Saillet
1999	"Unut Beni"	"Ölürüm Sana"	—N/a
1999	"İnci Tanem"	"Ölürüm Sana"	—N/a
2001	"Kuzu Kuzu"	"Karma"	Metin Arolat
2001	"Kuzu Kuzu" (Acoustic)	"Karma"	Metin Arolat
2001	"Hüp"	"Karma"	Ferzan Özpetek
2001	"Ay"	"Karma"	—N/a
2002	"Hüp" (Remix)	"Karma"	Ferzan Özpetek
2002	"Verme"	"Karma"	Kıvanç Baruönü
2002	"Verme" (Version 2)	"Karma"	Kıvanç Baruönü
2002	"Bir Oluruz Yolunda"	"Bir Oluruz Yolunda"	Kıvanç Baruönü
2003	"Dudu"	"Dudu"	Umur Turagay
2003	"Gülümse Kaderine"	"Dudu"	Metin Arolat
2003	"Sorma Kalbim"	"Dudu"	Metin Arolat
2004	"Uzun İnce Bir Yoldayım" (Remix)	"Dudu"	Kıvanç Baruönü
2005	"Ayrılık Zor"	"Ayrılık Zor"	—N/a
2005	"Ayrılık Zor" (Acoustic)	"Ayrılık Zor"	—N/a
2005	"Bounce"	"Come Closer"	Martin Weisz
2006	"Start the Fire"	"Come Closer"	Kıvanç Baruönü
2008	"Vay Anam Vay"	"Metamorfoz"	Kıvanç Baruönü
2008	"Pare Pare"	"Metamorfoz"	Altan Dönmez
2008	"Arada Bir"	"Metamorfoz"	Metin Arolat
2008	"Dilli Düdük"	"Metamorfoz"	Murat Onbul
2009	"Uyan"	"Uyan"	Altan Dönmez
2010	"Sevdanın Son Vuruşu"	"Adımı Kalbine Yaz"	—N/a
2010	"Öp"	"Adımı Kalbine Yaz"	Nadir Bekar
2011	"Acımayacak"	"Adımı Kalbine Yaz"	Murad Küçük
2011	"Kayıp"	"Adımı Kalbine Yaz"	Serdar Dönmez & Michel Dierickx
2011	"Adımı Kalbine Yaz" (Ozinga Club Mix)	"Adımı Kalbine Yaz"	Nadir Bekar
2012	"Kara Toprak"	"Kara Toprak"	Altan Dönmez
2012	"Aşk Gitti Bizden" (feat. Ozan Çolakoğlu)	"01"	Eric Heimbold
2014	"Hadi O Zaman" (feat. Nazan Öncel)	"Bazı Şeyler"	Murad Küçük
2014	"Hop De" (feat. İskender Paydaş)	"Zamansız Şarkılar 2"	Murad Küçük
2017	"Yolla"	"10"	Murad Küçük
2017	"Beni Çok Sev"	"10"	Murad Küçük
2018	"Çok Ağladım"	"10"	İrfan Yıldırım
2018	"Kedi Gibi"	"10"	İrfan Yıldırım
2019	"O Sevişmeler"	"10"	Altan Dönmez
2021	"Hodri Meydan"	"10"	İrfan Yıldırım
2022	"Geççek"	"Geççek"	İrfan Yıldırım
2022	"Yap Bi Güzellik"	"Yap Bi Güzellik"	İrfan Yıldırım
2023	"Sen Rahat Uyu"	"Sen Rahat Uyu"	Ömer Faruk Sorak
2024	"Şerbetli"	"Kuantum 51"	Murad Küçük

== Other tracks ==
Year	Song	Composer	Lyricist	Remix
1995	Bu Kış	Tarkan	Tarkan	
1995	Şeytan Azapta (Remix)	Ozan Çolakoğlu	Sezen Aksu	Ozan Çolakoğlu
1996	Kara Gözler	Tarkan	Tarkan	
1997	Yeni Yıl	Tarkan		
1998	Salına Salına Sinsice (Remix)	Tarkan	Tarkan	Ozan Çolakoğlu
2002	Hüp (Remix)	Nazan Öncel	Nazan Öncel	
2004	Uzun İnce Bir Yoldayım (Ozinga Mix)	Aşık Veysel	Aşık Veysel	Ozan Çolakoğlu
2008	Who's Gonna Love You Now	Miri Ben-Ari/Tarkan	P.B.M/Tarkan	
2008	Why Don't We? (Aman Aman) feat Wyclef Jean & Filly	Tarkan/B.K./J.S.	Tarkan/B.K./J.S.	
2008	Bounce feat. Malverde & Filly	Tarkan/D.K./P.B.M/E.W./L.B.	Tarkan/D.K./P.B.M/E.W./L.B.	
2018	Yolla (Pop Orient Mix)	Tarkan, Ozan Çolakoğlu	Tarkan	
2019	Her Şey Fani (Remix)	Sezen Aksu	Sezen Aksu	Mahmut Orhan

=== Official tracks from other albums ===
Year	Song	Composer	Lyricist	Remix	Album
	Unutmamalı (remix)	Tarkan	Tarkan	Dj Onur	
1999	Bu Gece (Kir Zincirlerini) (Club Mix)	Tarkan	Tarkan		Dream Dance 2000
2004	Gülümse Kaderine (Hsyn Krdy Mix)	Tarkan	Tarkan	Hüseyin Karadayı	Miracles
2004	Dudu (Neomaster Mix)	Tarkan/Jeff Koplan	Nazan Öncel	Neomaster	Марафон
2006	Touch (Hsyn Krdy Mix)	L.M./Tarkan/T.L	L.M./Tarkan/T.L	Hüseyin Karadayı	You Dance from Istanbul
2006	Bounce (Armand Van Helden Short Mix)	Tarkan/D.K./B./E.W./L.B.	Tarkan/D.K./B./E.W./L.B.	Armand van Helden	Firstclass Best Of Vol. 2
2008	Alaturka	Fahir Atakoğlu			İz
2009	Vay Anam Vay (Suat Ateşdağlı Remix)	Tarkan	Tarkan	Suat Ateşdağlı	Bosphorus Night 3
2010	Her Şeye Rağmen				Kalbim
2010	Unutmamalı (Ozan Doğulu remix)	Tarkan	Tarkan	Ozan Doğulu	130 Bpm
2010	Pare Pare (Ozan Doğulu remix)	Ozan Çolakoğlu	Tarkan	Ozan Doğulu	130 Bpm
2012	Aşk Gitti Bizden	Tarkan	Tarkan	Ozan Çolakoğlu	01
2012	Hadi Bakalım	Tarkan	Tarkan	Ozan Çolakoğlu	01
2012	Hatasız Kul Olmaz	Orhan Gencebay	Orhan Gencebay		Orhan Gencebay ile Bir Ömür
2013	Firuze	Attila Özdemiroğlu	Aysel Gürel and Sezen Aksu		Aysel'in
2014	Yemin Ettim	Kayahan	Kayahan		Kayahan'ın En İyileri No.1
2018	Yalnızlar Treni	Nazan Öncel	Nazan Öncel		Ve Nazan Öncel Şarkıları

=== Tarkan's Ottoman classical music songs ===
#	Song	Composer	Lyricist	Album
1	Dönülmez Akşam Ufkundayız			
2	Dertliyim Ruhuma Hicran			
3	Enginde Yavaş Yavaş			
4	Rüya Gibi Uçan Yıllar			
5	Gülsen-i Hüsnüne			
6	Bir Bahar Akşamı			
7	Fasıl			
8	Tuti Mucize-i Guyem			
9	Duydum ki Unutmuşsun			
10	Benzemez Kimse Sana			Müzeyyen Senar ile Bir Ömre Bedel
11	Ben Nasıl Yanmayayım Dağlar			

== Appearances ==
Year	Album	Singer	Song	Tarkan's appearance
1994	Hatırasıdır	Sibel Can	Gül Döktüm Yollarına	Composer / Lyricist
1994	İşte Ses, İşte Yorum	Kibariye	Vazgeçemem	Lyricist
1995	Her Gece	Mirkelam	Her Gece	Vocal
1995	Dillere Destan	Yıldız Tilbe	Havalım	Composer / Lyricist
1997	Usul Usul	Nalan	Canımsın	Composer / Lyricist
1997	Disney Herkül OST	(Various)	Yolumdayım	Soloist
1998	Müzeyyen Senar ile Bir Ömre Bedel	Müzeyyen Senar	Benzemez Kimse Sana	Feat / Clip player
1998	Hay! Morena	Zapata	Hay! Morena	Composer
1998	Ой, мама шика дам!	Philip Kirkorov	The kiss	Composer
1998		Jelena Karelusa	Zene vole dijamante	Composer
1998	Yine Bir Başıma	Metin Arolat	Yine Bir Başıma	Vocal
		4 Cats		Composer
		Merhan	Booseh	Composer
1999		Samy Mansour		Composer
1999		EO2		Composer
1999		Khaled		Composer
1999		Lefteris Pantazis		Composer
1999	Афіни-Київ-Істанбул	Viktor Pavlik	Розбещений	Composer
2000		Sharareh		Composer
2000	Planeta Suza	Velimir Mitrovic Gale	Moderna Veza	Composer
2001	Dirty Little Secret	Stella Soleil	Kiss Kiss	Composer / Vocal
2001	Entre dos orillas	Hakim	La muchacha turca	Composer
2001		Andrea del Valle	Condenado a Amar	Composer
2002	Footprints	Holly Valance	Kiss kiss	Composer
2002	Ayshalak	Elissa	Shou El Hal	Composer
2003	İkimizin Yerine	Müslüm Gürses	İkimizin Yerine	Composer / Lyricist
2003	Türkü Söylemek Lazım	Pınar Sağ	Hoyda Yarim	Feat
2003	Mazi Sou	Peggy Zina	Den Aksizis	Composer
2004	Unity: The Official Athens 2004 Olympic Games	Trevor Horn, Yiannis Kotsiras, Katia	Pass The Flame	Feat
2004	Cirkus	Alka Vuica	Bosna	Composer / Arranger
2004		Yosi Piamenta	Kol Hamesameach	Composer
2004	Yan Yana Fotoğraf Çektirelim	Nazan Öncel	Hay Hay	Feat / Clip player
2004	Yan Yana Fotoğraf Çektirelim	Nazan Öncel	Nereye Böyle	Vocal / Clip player
2005	100 Stepeni	Dado Polumenta	100 Stepeni	Composer / Arranger
2005	100 Stepeni	Dado Polumenta	Ekstaza	Composer / Arranger
2006	Gülümse Kaderine	Kibariye	Gülümse Kaderine	Composer / Lyricist / Feat / Clip player
2007	Maximum	Murat Boz	Püf	Composer / Lyricist / Back Vocal
2007	Akşam Sefası	Sibel Can	Çakmak Çakmak	Composer / Lyricist / Vocal
2007	Skylight (Gökyüzü)	Ayhan Günyıl	Skylight (Gökyüzü)	Vocal
2007	Skylight (Gökyüzü)	Ayhan Günyıl	Gitti Gideli	Composer / Lyricis
2008	İz	Fahir Atakoğlu	Alaturka	Soloist
2009	Benim Adım Aşk	Sibel Can	Çantada Keklik	Composer / Lyricist / Back Vocal
2009	Ben Sen Olamam	Emir	Ben Sen Olamam	Composer / Lyricist / Back Vocal / Clip player
2010	Acıkolik	Nill Özalp	Acıkolik	Composer / Lyricist / Back Vocal
2010	4 mevsim	Kibariye	Arada Bir	Composer / Lyricist / Back Vocal
2010		Murat Boz	Kır Zincirlerini	Composer / Lyricist
2010		Skepta	Oynama Şıkıdım	Feat
2010	Kalbim	Enbe Orkestrası	Herşeye Rağmen	Soloist
2011	Söz-Müzik Ümit Sayın	Ümit Sayın	Gitme	Feat / Clip player
2011	Farkın Bu	Ajda Pekkan	Yakar Geçerim	Composer / Lyricist / Back Vocal
2011	Aşktan Sabıkalı	Bülent Ersoy	Bir Ben Bir Allah Biliyor	Composer / Lyricist / Feat
2012	Ölürüm Sana	RockA	Ölürüm Sana	Composer / Lyrics / Clip player
2012	01	Ajda Pekkan	Ben Yanmışım	Composer / Lyricist
2013		Emel Sayın	Hep Bana	Composer / Lyricist / Back Vocal
2014	Bazı Şeyler	Nazan Öncel	Hadi O Zaman	Feat / Back Vocal / Clip player
2014		İskender Paydaş	Hop De	Feat / Vocal / Clip player
2015		Sibel Can	Bir Parmak Bal	Composer / Lyricist / Back Vocal
2019		Bülent Ersoy	Ümit Hırsızı	Composer / Lyricist / Back Vocal
2021		Sibel Can	Adı Elveda Olsun	Composer / Lyricist / Back Vocal

== Tarkan cover songs / Tarkan song's appearances ==
Year	Album	Singer	Language	Cover song	Tarkan's song
1994	Hatırasıdır	Sibel Can	Türkçe (Turkish)	Gül Döktüm Yollarına	Gül Döktüm Yollarına
1994	İşte Ses, İşte Yorum	Kibariye	Türkçe (Turkish)	Vazgeçemem	Vazgeçemem
		Megalomaniax	Türkçe (Turkish)	Oynama Şıkıdım (remix)	Şıkıdım / Hepsi Senin Mi
1995		Niels William	Nederlands (Dutch)	Zie Ze Doen	Hepsi Senin Mi / Şıkıdım
1997		Silhouettt	فارسی (Persian)	Paeez	Hepsi Senin Mi / Şıkıdım
1998	Hay! Morena	Zapata	Español (Spanish)	Hay! Morena	Şımarık
1998		Jelena Karleusa	Српски (Serbian)	Zene Vole Dijamante	Şımarık
1998	Ой, мама шика дам!	Philip Kirkorov	Русский (Russian)	The Kiss	Şımarık
1998	Ой, мама шика дам!	Philip Kirkorov	Русский (Russian)	Oh mama shika dam	Şıkıdım / Hepsi Senin Mi
		Naser El Mazadawy	العربية (Arabic)	Khaly Yeqolo	Şıkıdım / Hepsi Senin Mi
		4 Cats	العربية (Arabic)		Şımarık
		Mehran	فارسی (Persian)	Booseh	Şımarık
1999		Samy Mansour	العربية (Arabic)		Şımarık
1999		EO2	中文 (Chinese)		Şımarık
1999		Khaled	العربية (Arabic)		Şımarık
1999		Lefteris Pantazis	Ελληνικά (Greek)	Filakia	Şımarık
1999	Афіни-Київ-Істанбул	Viktor Pavlik	Українська (Ukrainian)	Розбещений	Şımarık
2000		Sharareh	العربية (Arabic)	Yeki Na Dota	Şımarık
2001	Dirty Little Secret	Stella Soleil	English	Kiss Kiss	Şımarık
2001	Entre dos orillas	Hakim	Español (Spanish)	La muchacha turca	Şımarık
2001		Andrea del Valle	Español (Spanish)	Condenado a Amar	Kuzu Kuzu
2001		Elissa	العربية (Arabic)	Shou El-Hal	Kuzu Kuzu
2001		Ji Hyeun Lee	한국어 (Korean)		Hüp
2002	Footprints	Holly Valance	English	Kiss kiss	Şımarık
		Müslüm Gürses	Türkçe (Turkish)	İkimizin Yerine	İkimizin Yerine
2003		Peggy Zina	Ελληνικά (Greek)	Den Aksizis	Dudu
2004	Cirkus	Alka Vuica & Halid Bešlić	Hrvatski (Croatian)/Bosanski (Bosnian)	Bosna	Dudu
2004		Yossi Piamenta	Polski (Polish)	Kol Hamesameach	Şımarık
2005	100 Stepeni	Dado Polumenta	Bosanski (Bosnian)	Ekstaza	Şımarık
2005	100 Stepeni	Dado Polumenta	Bosanski (Bosnian)	100 Stepeni	Dudu
2006	Gülümse kaderine	Kibariye	Türkçe (Turkish)	Gülümse Kaderine	Gülümse Kaderine
2007	Skylight (Gökyüzü)	Ayhan Günyıl	Türkçe (Turkish)	Gitti Gideli	Gitti Gideli
2010		Murat Boz	Türkçe (Turkish)	Kır Zincirlerini	Kır Zincirlerini
2010		Skepta	English	Oynama sikidim	Şıkıdım / Hepsi Senin Mi
2010		Kibariye	Türkçe (Turkish)	Arada bir	Arada bir
2012	Ölürüm Sana	RockA	Türkçe	Ölürüm Sana	Ölürüm Sana

== Soundtracks ==
Year	Title	Song	Info
1997	Disney's Hercules	Yolumdayım	Tarkan sang the Disney accredited Turkish version of Michael Bolton's "Go The Distance" and voiced the adult Hercules, replacing the original vocals by Tate Donovan.
1999	Beau Travail	Şımarık	
1999	Geboren in Absurdistan	Şımarık	
2002	XX/XY	Şımarık	
2005	Mr Socrates	Ölürüm Sana	
2011	Entelköy Efeköye Karşı	Kara Toprak	

== Charts ==
Year	Title	Chart positions							
Year	Title	Turkey	United States	Russia	Germany	Austria	France	Belgium	Swiss
1999	Şımarık	—	26	—	6	14	3	1	3
1999	Şıkıdım	—	—	—	35	40	10	6	22
1999	Bu Gece	—	—	—	71	—	19	29	—
2001	Kuzu Kuzu	1	—	110	—	—	—	—	—
2001	Ay	1	—	—	—	—	—	—	—
2001	Hüp	1	—	144	—	—	—	—	—
2004	Dudu	1	—	1	—	—	—	—	—
2004	Gülümse Kaderine	1	—	—	—	—	—	—	—
2005	Bounce	1	—	25	5	43	—	—	60
2006	Start The Fire		—	160	43	—	—	—	—
2007	Vay Anam Vay	1	—	105	—	—	—	—	—
2008	Pare Pare	2	—	—	—	—	—	—	—
2008	Arada Bir	2	—	—	—	—	—	—	—
2008	Dilli Düdük	3	—	—	—	—	—	—	—
2008	Dedikodu	19	—	—	—	—	—	—	—
2010	Sevdanın Son Vuruşu	3	—	—	—	—	—	—	—
2010	Adımı Kalbine Yaz	1	—	—	—	—	—	—	—
2010	Öp	1	—	—	—	—	—	—	—
2011	Acımayacak	5	—	—	—	—	—	—	—
2011	Kayıp	2	—	—	—	—	—	—	—
2012	Aşk Gitti Bizden (feat. Ozan Çolakoğlu)	1	—	—	—	—	—	—	—
2014	Hadi O Zaman (feat. Nazan Öncel)	2	—	—	—	—	—	—	—
2014	Hop De (feat. İskender Paydaş)	1	—	—	—	—	—	—	—
2017	Yolla	1	—	—	—	—	—	—	—
2017	Beni Çok Sev	1	—	—	—	—	—	—	—
2018	Çok Ağladım	4	—	—	—	—	—	—	—
2018	Kedi Gibi	6	—	—	—	—	—	—	—
