= List of best-selling albums in Turkey =

The following is an independently-determined list of best-selling albums in Turkey, organized into three categories: all-time best-selling albums, best-selling albums by year, and best-selling albums by foreign artists. This list can contain any types of album, including studio albums, extended plays, greatest hits, compilations, various artists, soundtracks and remixes. The figures given do not take into account the resale of used albums.

Most sales figures are drawn from international music industry publications such as Music & Media and Billboard, national newspapers, and Turkish music organizations such as Mü-Yap, an IFPI member, and MESAM (Turkish: Türkiye Musiki Eseri Sahipleri Meslek Birliği; English: Turkish Musical Work Owners Professional Association), a music copyright collective founded in 1986. According to British ethnomusicologist Martin Stokes, MESAM's first efforts to establish official sales figures date back to 1990.

The Turkish music market has traditionally been dominated by local artists, with various albums by Turkish artists achieving sales of one million copies or more. By contrast, albums by foreign musicians achieved sales only of up to 150,000 copies, according to a 2010 report published in the Global Journal of Human Social Science. Since introducing its certification program in 2003, Mü-Yap has awarded Diamond certifications to various domestic artists, each representing 300,000 certified units. According to the organization's annual reports, actual sales of many of these albums were slightly higher.

Various artists have multiple entries, with İbrahim Tatlıses, Tarkan and Sezen Aksu having the highest claims with at least one release reaching 3 million units across the nation. Furthermore, Tarkan is one of the few artists with a release with more than a million copies sold in the country in both 20th and 21st centuries. Allah Allah-Hülya (1987) by İbrahim Tatlıses became one of the fastest-selling albums to reach the million mark, in a lapse of one and a half month according to Milliyet.

== Legend ==
Colors
Studio albums
Greatest hits and compilations
Extended plays
Live albums

== Best-selling albums ==
Best-selling albums in Turkey (at over 800,000)
Year	Artist	Album	Claimed sales	Ref.
1985	İbrahim Tatlıses	Mavi Mavi	3,200,000; 3,100,000	
1997	Tarkan	Ölürüm Sana	3,000,000; 2,600,000	
1991	Sezen Aksu	Gülümse	3,000,000; 2,500,000	
1990	Coşkun Sabah	Beni Unutma-Aşığım Sana	2,800,000; 2,700,000	
1984	Orhan Gencebay	Dil Yarası	2,700,000; 2,600,000	
1998	Mahsun Kırmızıgül	Yıkılmadım	2,600,000	
1999	Barış Manço	Mançoloji	2,600,000	
1994	Tarkan	Aacayipsin	2,000,000	
2001	Tarkan	Karma	1,500,000	
2003	Tarkan	Dudu	1,500,000	
1986	Ceylan	Seni Sevmeyen Ölsün	1,300,000	
1994	Mahsun Kırmızıgül	12'den Vuracağım	1,240,000	
1987	İbrahim Tatlıses	Allah Allah-Hülya	1,000,000	
1987	Bergen	Acıların Kadını	1,000,000	
2000	Mahsun Kırmızıgül	Yoruldum	900,000	
1989	Sezen Aksu	Sezen Aksu Söylüyor	845,000	
2004	Serdar Ortaç	Çakra	812,500	
2004	Mahsun Kırmızıgül	Sari Sari Başroldeyım	811,000	
1989	İbrahim Tatlıses	İnsanlar	800,000	

== Best-selling albums by year ==
According to Mü-Yap (2003-2017)
Year	Album	Artist	Sales
1998	Yıkılmadım	Mahsun Kırmızıgül	2,500,000
2001	Karma	Tarkan	950,000
2003	Anca Gidersin	Yıldız Tilbe	650,000
2004	Çakra	Serdar Ortaç	812,500
2005	Bahane	Sezen Aksu	421,200
2006	Bombabomba.com	İsmail YK	540,000
2007	Bulamadım	İbrahim Tatlıses	420,500
2008	Çok Sevdim İkimizi	Ferhat Göçer	303,000
2009	Yağmurla Gelen Kadın	İbrahim Tatlıses	133,891 (Note: Reported sales between January to July 2009 only.)
2010	Adımı Kalbine Yaz	Tarkan	355,000
2011	Farkın Bu	Ajda Pekkan	175,000
2012	Orhan Gencebay ile Bir Ömür	Orhan Gencebay	419,985
2013	Beni Durdursan mı?	Gülşen	466,646 (Note: Combined physical (100,000) and digital sales (366,646))
2014	Yeni Ay	Sıla	158,041
2015	Pırlanta	Demet Akalın	105,000
2016	Ahde Vefa	Tarkan	272,500
2017	10	Tarkan	390,000

== Best-selling albums by international artists ==
According to Music & Media (June 1998), Ricky Martin's Vuelve had sold 180,000 copies in Turkey, making it the best-selling album by an international solo artist in the country at that point. By contrast, following the introduction of Mü-Yap's certification program in 2003, only four albums received certifications in each of 2008 and 2009. Gold and Platinum certifications represented 5,000 and 10,000 copies sold, respectively.

Albums by international artists (at over 100,000)
Year	Artist	Album	Claimed sales	Ref.
1991	Metallica	Metallica	300,000	
1998	Ricky Martin	Vuelve	200,000	
1989	Madonna	Like a Prayer	151,000	
1986	Madonna	True Blue	100,000	

== List of Turkish artists by claimed sales ==
Artist	Claimed sales	Namesake photo
İbrahim Tatlıses	33 million 30 million	
Orhan Gencebay	28 million	
Ferdi Tayfur	27 million	
Sezen Aksu	27 million	
Ahmet Kaya	26 million	
Tarkan	14 million	

== See also ==
- List of best-selling albums
  - List of best-selling albums by country
- List of best-selling singles by country§Turkey
- Music of Turkey
- Arabesque
- Turkish pop music
