= List of fastest-selling albums =

This is a list of the fastest-selling albums in global recorded music. To appear on the list, the figure must have been published by a reliable source and all sales must have occurred in the first week of release. This list may include any type of album, including studio albums, extended plays, greatest hits, compilations, soundtracks and remixes. Market order within the article is ranked alphabetically. Albums within each table are listed in order of the number of copies sold and thereafter by the artist's first name.

== Argentina ==
List of fastest-selling albums in Argentina
Year	Album	Artist	Sales	Ref.
1997	Romances	Luis Miguel	400,000	
1968	Fuiste Mia Un Verano	Leonardo Favio	100,000	
1987	The Joshua Tree	U2	50,000	

== Brazil ==
List of fastest-selling albums in Brazil
Year	Album	Artist	Sales	Ref.
1987	Xegundo Xou da Xuxa	Xuxa	1,200,000	

== Cameroon ==
List of fastest-selling albums in Cameroon
Year	Album	Artist	Sales	Ref.
1996	Class F/M	Petit-Pays	50,000	

== Canada ==
List of fastest-selling albums in Canada since 1995
Year	Album	Artist	Sales	Ref.
2015	25	Adele	306,000	
1997	Let's Talk About Love	Céline Dion	230,200	
1999	Millennium	Backstreet Boys	191,791	
2003	Star Académie	Star Académie	173,000	
2000	Black & Blue	Backstreet Boys	156,307	
2002	A New Day Has Come	Céline Dion	151,600	
2002	Up!	Shania Twain	150,000	
2024	The Tortured Poets Department	Taylor Swift	150,000	
2008	Black Ice	AC/DC	119,000	
2006	I Think of You	Gregory Charles	109,000	
2014	1989	Taylor Swift	107,000	
2005	X&Y	Coldplay	105,000	

== Chile ==
List of fastest-selling albums in Chile
Year	Album	Artist	Sales	Ref.
1994	Segundo Romance	Luis Miguel	50,000	
2002	Estadio Nacional	Los Prisioneros	30,000	
2000	Vivo	Luis Miguel	25,000	

== China ==
List of fastest-selling albums in China
Year	Album	Artist	Sales	Ref.
2022	Greatest Works of Art	Jay Chou	5,000,000	

== Colombia ==
List of fastest-selling albums in Colombia
Year	Album	Artist	Sales	Ref.
1997	Tengo Fe	Carlos Vives	300,000	
2013	Loco de Amor	Juanes	240,000	
2013	Corazón Profundo	Carlos Vives	120,000	
2005	Fijación Oral, Vol. 1	Shakira	100,000	
1997	Romances	Luis Miguel	70,000	

== Denmark ==
List of fastest-selling albums in Denmark
Year	Album	Artist	Sales	Ref.
2006	Gammel Hankat	Kim Larsen & Kjukken	75,000	
1999	Dream	Thomas Helmig	60,000	
2013	Ingen Kan Love Dig i Morgen	Rasmus Seebach	60,000	
2007	For Dig Ku' Jeg Gøre Alting	TV-2	50,000	
2011	Mer' end Kærlighed	Rasmus Seebach	42,000	
2000	Aquarius	Aqua	39,000	
2008	Show the World	Martin	36,000	
2015	Verden Ka' Vente	Rasmus Seebach	31,600	

== France ==
List of fastest-selling albums in France
Year	Album	Artist	Sales	Ref.
2018	Mon Pays C'est l'Amour	Johnny Hallyday	780,177	
2002	À la Vie, À la Mort!	Johnny Hallyday	305,634	
2016	Encore Un Soir	Céline Dion	217,000	
2013	Random Access Memories	Daft Punk	195,013	
2015	25	Adele	169,693	
2012	Monkey Me	Mylène Farmer	147,530	
2011	Bleu Noir	Mylène Farmer	139,176	
2015	Interstellaires	Mylène Farmer	109,971	

== Germany ==
List of fastest-selling albums in Germany
Year	Album	Artist	Sales	Ref.
2007	12	Herbert Grönemeyer	300,000	
2017	Helene Fischer	Helene Fischer	300,000	
2015	25	Adele	263,000	
2019	Untitled	Rammstein	260,000	

== Greece ==
List of fastest-selling albums in Greece
Year	Album	Artist	Sales	Ref.
1998	Antidoto	Anna Vissi	80,000	

== Italy ==
List of fastest-selling albums in Italy
Year	Album	Artist	Sales	Ref.
2000	Esco di Rado e Parlo Ancora Meno	Adriano Celentano	350,000	
1998	Mina Celentano	Mina	315,000	
2005	Nome e Cognome	Luciano Ligabue	250,000	
1999	Io Non So Parlar d'Amore	Adriano Celentano	100,000	

== Ireland ==
List of fastest-selling albums in Ireland
Year	Album	Artist	Sales	Ref.
1998	The Best of 1980–1990	U2	Not disclosed	

== Japan ==
List of fastest-selling albums in Japan since 1967
Year	Album	Artist	Sales	Ref.
2001	Distance	Hikaru Utada	3,002,720	
2001	A Best	Ayumi Hamasaki	2,874,870	
1998	B'z The Best "Pleasure"	B'z	2,709,530	
1998	B'z The Best "Treasure"	B'z	2,500,120	
2002	Deep River	Hikaru Utada	2,350,170	
2000	Delicious Way	Mai Kuraki	2,218,640	
1999	First Love	Hikaru Utada	2,026,870	
1997	Review	Glay	2,003,150	
1996	Sweet 19 Blues	Namie Amuro	1,921,850	
2002	I Am...	Ayumi Hamasaki	1,751,360	

== Mexico ==
List of fastest-selling albums in Mexico
Year	Album	Artist	Sales	Ref.
1990	20 Años	Luis Miguel	600,000	
1994	Segundo Romance	Luis Miguel	600,000	
1997	Romances	Luis Miguel	560,000	
2004	México en la Piel	Luis Miguel	400,000	
1996	Nada Es Igual...	Luis Miguel	400,000	
2008	Cómplices	Luis Miguel	320,000	
2005	Nuestro Amor	RBD	160,000	
2005	Fijación Oral, Vol. 1	Shakira	100,000	

== New Zealand ==
List of fastest-selling albums in New Zealand
Year	Album	Artist	Sales	Ref.
2015	25	Adele	18,766	
2009	I Dreamed a Dream	Susan Boyle	17,435	
2013	Pure Heroine	Lorde	15,000	

== Netherlands ==
List of fastest-selling albums in the Netherlands
Year	Album	Artist	Sales	Ref.
2015	25	Adele	Not disclosed	

== Sierra Leone ==
List of fastest-selling albums in Sierra Leone
Year	Album	Artist	Sales	Ref.
2014	Home and Away	Emmerson	28,000	
2016	Survivor	Emmerson	12,000	

== Spain ==
List of fastest-selling albums in Spain
Year	Album	Artist	Sales	Ref.
2000	El Alma al Aire	Alejandro Sanz	1,000,000	
2002	Corazón Latino	David Bisbal	600,000	
2003	Divorcio	Julio Iglesias	200,000	
2000	Alma Caribeña	Gloria Estefan	150,000	

== South Korea ==
List of fastest-selling albums in South Korea since 1993 (Note: The Hanteo chart provides real-time daily, weekly, and monthly sales updates, but only accounts for data received from affiliated stores and therefore does not reflect the total sales of a given release. The Circle Album Chart (formerly Gaon), counts albums shipped to all stores regardless of affiliation, so there is always a noticeable difference between its figures and Hanteo's. Gaon, however, only began providing realtime data from 2019. Given this article's scope, and the limitations of existing sources, Hanteo's numbers alone are used.)
Year	Album	Artist	Sales	Ref.
2023	Seventeenth Heaven	Seventeen	5,091,887	
2023	5-Star	Stray Kids	4,617,499	
2023	FML	Seventeen	4,550,214	
2023	ISTJ	NCT Dream	3,652,897	
2020	Map of the Soul: 7	BTS	3,378,633	
2024	17 Is Right Here	Seventeen	2,960,000	
2022	Proof	BTS	2,752,496	
2023	Golden	Jung Kook	2,438,483	
2020	Be	BTS	2,274,882	
2023	The Name Chapter: Freefall	TXT	2,251,959	

== Turkey ==
List of fastest-selling albums in Turkey
Year	Album	Artist	Sales	Ref.
2003	Seven	Mustafa Sandal	500,000	
2007	Metamorfoz	Tarkan	300,000	
2016	Ahde Vefa	Tarkan	150,000	
2014	Yeni Ay	Sıla	70,000	

== United Kingdom ==
List of fastest-selling albums in the United Kingdom
Year	Album	Artist	Sales	Ref.
2015	25	Adele	803,000	
1997	Be Here Now	Oasis	696,000	
2017	÷	Ed Sheeran	672,000	
1963	With the Beatles	The Beatles	530,000	
2010	Progress	Take That	518,601	
2005	X&Y	Coldplay	464,471	
2008	The Circus	Take That	432,490	
2025	The Life of a Showgirl	Taylor Swift	423,444	
2009	I Dreamed a Dream	Susan Boyle	411,820	
2003	Life for Rent	Dido	400,351	

Notes

- Be Here Now (1997) by Oasis debuted at number one based on three-day sales of 696,000 copies, while its first full week actually totaled 813,000 copies.
- 25 (2015) by Adele sold 439,000 copies in its second week of availability, followed by 450,000 in its fifth.

== United States ==
=== Since 1991 ===
List of fastest-selling albums in the United States since 1991
Year	Album	Artist	Sales	Ref.
2025	The Life of a Showgirl	Taylor Swift	3,479,500	
2015	25	Adele	3,378,000	
2000	No Strings Attached	NSYNC	2,416,000	
2024	The Tortured Poets Department	Taylor Swift	1,914,000	
2001	Celebrity	NSYNC	1,880,000	
2000	The Marshall Mathers LP	Eminem	1,760,000	
2000	Black & Blue	Backstreet Boys	1,591,000	
2023	1989 (Taylor's Version)	Taylor Swift	1,359,000	
2000	Oops!... I Did It Again	Britney Spears	1,319,000	
2014	1989	Taylor Swift	1,287,000	
2017	Reputation	Taylor Swift	1,216,000	
2012	Red	Taylor Swift	1,208,000	
2005	The Massacre	50 Cent	1,141,000	(Note: Denotes sales from The Massacre's first four days of availability as the album was unconventionally released in the middle of an ongoing tracking week.)
2022	Midnights	Taylor Swift	1,140,000	
1999	Millennium	Backstreet Boys	1,134,000	
2011	Born This Way	Lady Gaga	1,108,000	
2004	Confessions	Usher	1,096,000	
1998	Double Live	Garth Brooks	1,085,000	
2000	Chocolate Starfish and the Hot Dog Flavored Water	Limp Bizkit	1,055,000	
2010	Speak Now	Taylor Swift	1,047,000	
2004	Feels Like Home	Norah Jones	1,022,000	
2008	Tha Carter III	Lil Wayne	1,006,000	

=== Before 1991 ===
List of fastest-selling albums in the United States before 1991 (Note: The following albums predate the introduction of Nielsen SoundScan and their sales figures are possibly subject to manipulation as sales were self-reported by record labels.)
Year	Album	Artist	Sales	Ref.
1963	John Fitzgerald Kennedy – A Memorial Album	John F. Kennedy	4,000,000	
1970	Let It Be	The Beatles	3,700,000	(Note: Based on two weeks instead of one.)
1987	Bad	Michael Jackson	2,250,000	
1968	The Beatles	The Beatles	1,900,000	(Note: Reports state the album sold "almost two million" copies in a week.)
1984	Purple Rain	Prince	1,500,000	
1986	Live/1975–85	Bruce Springsteen	1,500,000	(Note: Based on ten days instead of a week.)
1975	Captain Fantastic and the Brown Dirt Cowboy	Elton John	1,400,000	(Note: Based on four days instead of a week.)
1971	Music	Carole King	1,300,000	(Note: Based on a single day instead of a week.)
1965	Rubber Soul	The Beatles	1,200,000	(Note: Based on nine days instead of a week.)

Notes

- The Bodyguard (1992) by Whitney Houston sold 1.06 million copies in its Christmas week.
- 1 (2000) by the Beatles sold 1.25 million copies in its Christmas week.
- Encore (2004) by Eminem sold 1.58 million copies in its first ten days of availability, after an abbreviated three-day first week.
- 25 (2015) by Adele sold 1.11 million copies in its second week of availability, followed by 1.16 million in its fifth.

== Zimbabwe ==
List of fastest-selling albums in Zimbabwe
Year	Album	Artist	Sales	Ref.
2016	Tsoka Dzerwendo	Alick Macheso	100,000	
2001	Chimurenga Rebel	Thomas Mapfumo	30,000	
2003	Toi Toi	Thomas Mapfumo	30,000	

== Worldwide ==
†	Sales based in a single territory

List of fastest-selling albums worldwide
Year	Album	Artist	Sales/Shipments	Ref.
1991	Dangerous	Michael Jackson	9,000,000	(Note: According to Sony Music International, Michael Jackson's Dangerous has shipped 4 million units in the US and 5 million units outside the US)
1987	Bad	Michael Jackson	7,000,000	
2015	25	Adele	5,700,000	
2004	Encore	Eminem	5,500,000	
1995	HIStory: Past, Present and Future, Book I	Michael Jackson	5,300,000	(Note: Michael Jackson's History album shipped 3 million units in advance in Europe and 2.3 million units in the United States.)
2023	Seventeenth Heaven †	Seventeen	5,000,000	
2022	Greatest Works of Art †	Jay Chou	5,000,000	
2005	X&Y	Coldplay	5,000,000	
2000	Black & Blue	Backstreet Boys	5,000,000	
2002	Elvis: 30 #1 Hits	Elvis Presley	4,700,000	
2023	5-Star †	Stray Kids	4,600,000	
2023	FML †	Seventeen	4,500,000	
1963	John Fitzgerald Kennedy – A Memorial Album †	John F. Kennedy	4,000,000	
2025	The Life of a Showgirl	Taylor Swift	3,871,341	(Note: Traditional sales from the United States, United Kingdom, and France alone. Global total unit estimates reached 5.5 million.)
2020	Map of the Soul: 7	BTS	3,700,000	
2000	1	The Beatles	3,600,000	
2023	ISTJ †	NCT Dream	3,600,000	
2005	Confessions on a Dance Floor	Madonna	3,600,000	(Note: Others sources estimated 4 million.)
1968	The Beatles	The Beatles	3,300,000	
2010	Michael	Michael Jackson	3,000,000	
2008	Viva la Vida or Death and All His Friends	Coldplay	3,000,000	
2001	Invincible	Michael Jackson	3,000,000	
2001	Distance †	Hikaru Utada	3,000,000	
2000	Music	Madonna	3,000,000	
1998	Ray of Light	Madonna	3,000,000	
2001	A Best †	Ayumi Hamasaki	2,800,000	
2022	Proof †	BTS	2,700,000	
1998	B'z The Best "Pleasure" †	B'z	2,700,000	
2000	Oops!... I Did It Again	Britney Spears	2,500,000	
1998	B'z The Best "Treasure" †	B'z	2,500,000	
2023	Golden †	Jungkook	2,400,000	
2000	No Strings Attached †	NSYNC	2,400,000	
2024	The Tortured Poets Department	Taylor Swift	2,255,184	(Note: Traditional sales from the United States, the United Kingdom, and Canada alone. Global total unit estimates reached 4 million.)
2023	The Name Chapter: Freefall †	TXT	2,200,000	
2020	Be †	BTS	2,200,000	
1998	Supposed Former Infatuation Junkie	Alanis Morissette	2,200,000	
2022	The Name Chapter: Temptation †	TXT	2,100,000	
2002	A Rush of Blood to the Head	Coldplay	2,000,000	
1992	Areíto	Juan Luis Guerra	2,000,000	

Notes

- Greatest Works of Art (2022) by Jay Chou holds the Guinness World Record for highest global first-week sales from a single territory, with 5 million units in China.

== See also ==
- Album era
- Lists of albums
- List of best-selling albums
- List of best-selling albums by country
- List of fastest-selling concert tours
