= Karma (Tarkan album) =

Studio album by Tarkan
- Released: 14 July 2001
- Studios: Cutting Room (New York), Erekli Tunç (Istanbul), Etap (Cairo), Imaj (Istanbul), Miraval (Le Val, France), Pacifique (Los Angeles) studios
- Genre: Pop
- Length: 49:50
- Label: İstanbul Plak
- Producers: Tarkan and Ozan Çolakoğlu

Tarkan chronology
Tarkan (1999)	Karma (2001)	Dudu (2003)

Singles from Karma
- 1. "Kuzu Kuzu" Released: 2 July 2001

Karma is Tarkan's fourth studio album, released in 2001. His fifth music project and his fourth original release, this album moved away from pop to worldbeat melodies fused with electronica sounds and became the all time third best selling album in Turkey. The album was recorded in Istanbul, Los Angeles, New York City, Egypt and Europe. It was published in Europe, North America, Asia, Japan, Russia. The tour "Kuzu Kuzu" which began in January 2002 was very successful as well and Tarkan performed in 19 countries and gave 26 concerts. As an introduction in the CD booklet, Tarkan explains the Karma philosophy and introduces the concept of using paper marbling art on his album cover.

The album was released in 2001 under the labels İstanbul Plak and Hitt Müzik, the latter of which was founded by Tarkan in 1997. While the cultural impact of his third album, Ölürüm Sana (1997), was still ongoing, he was drafted for military service in 2000. He began recording his fourth album in November of that year. The recordings, which were completed in May 2001, were made in six different studios. As with his previous album, he worked with a large team during the six-month recording period. The album included his own works as well as those of artists such as Mete Özgencil, Mazhar Alanson, and Nazan Öncel. Having featured works by Sezen Aksu on his previous two albums, Tarkan did not use any songs from her for this one. The album, which included twelve tracks, was first promoted with the release of a single, "Kuzu Kuzu", on 17 May 2001. The song, which caused a huge impact, became one of the most-streamed songs of the summer. For this album, Tarkan grew his hair long and changed his image. The album opened with record sales.

Karma became the fastest-selling and best-selling album of all time in Turkey. "Kuzu Kuzu" was a huge hit at the time, and its music video aired for a considerable time on television networks. While Mehmet Söğütoğlu produced Tarkan's first three albums, this one was produced by Tarkan and Ozan Çolakoğlu. It opened with a record-breaking opening week as the fastest-selling Turkish album of all time, both domestically and internationally. With total sales of over 1.9 million copies in Turkey and over 3.5 million copies internationally, it became the best-selling album of that year in Turkey. The album was released with agreed-upon distributors in Europe, the Middle East, Asia, Russia, Japan, and South America. It was met with considerable interest abroad, particularly in Russia and the Middle East. Having sold over a million copies in Europe, the album was also reported in the press as the best-selling foreign album in Russia in 2001. The album topped different charts in many countries, including Russia, France, Denmark, the UK, and Germany. Tarkan himself garnered a much larger fan base abroad, especially in Russia.

== Background ==
Tarkan's third album, Ölürüm Sana, released on 15 July 1997, sold over 3 million copies in Turkey. It achieved great success worldwide, selling over 4.5 million copies. With the worldwide release of the album, Tarkan (1998), first in Europe and then in Asia, Japan, Australia, North America and South America, he surpassed many world stars such as Gloria Estefan, Mariah Carey, Madonna and Janet Jackson in album sales. He received the Best Selling Turkish Artist award at the World Music Awards ceremony held on 5 May 1999, becoming the first Turkish artist to win this award. Due to the constant speculation about his military service status in the media at that time, he joined the military in 2000 as part of paid military service. Before his military service, he performed at a charity concert for the earthquake victims of the 1999 İzmit earthquake.

Karma became the fastest-selling and best-selling album of all time in Turkey. "Kuzu Kuzu" was a hit at the time, and its music video aired for a long time on television networks. Before the album's release, a conspiracy was hatched to thwart Tarkan's rise, and several photos of him at a nudist camp were stolen from his home and released to the press. Tarkan was heavily criticized by the press and conservative circles in Turkey for his photos, and the majority of them did not support the album. Nevertheless, the album opened with a record opening week, becoming the fastest-selling Turkish album of all time, both domestically and internationally. Overall, it sold over 1.9 million copies in Turkey and over 3.5 million copies internationally, making it the best-selling album of that year in Turkey. The album was released with agreed-upon distributors in Europe, the Middle East, Asia, Russia, Japan, and South America. It was met with considerable interest abroad, particularly in Russia and the Middle East. The album sold over a million copies in Europe and was reported in the press as the best-selling foreign album in Russia in 2001. Tarkan promoted the album at a famous nightclub in Istanbul. His dance and stage performance to another popular song, "Ay," was praised as extraordinary.

== Release and promotion ==
While recording the album was still ongoing, Tarkan signed an advertising deal with Pepsi in February 2001, which had previously worked with artists such as Michael Jackson, Tina Turner, Madonna, and Ricky Martin. This announcement was accompanied by his new look, which included long hair. On 13 March 2001, he walked on the catwalk with this image for the first time at a fashion show in Paris. He returned to Turkey from the US, where he had been staying for an extended period while recording his album, on 18 March 2001. The launch night of the Pepsi commercial was held at the Hilton Convention Center on 25 March 2001. In April 2001, a controversy erupted between him and then-MHP MP Mehmet Gül regarding homosexuality. Tarkan, who was preparing to release his new album at the time, was rumored to be in decline in album sales after the controversy spread among the media and the public. On 17 May 2001, he released the song "Kuzu Kuzu," which was to be included on the album and released as a promotional single. The song, which was written and composed by Tarkan himself, was his first single released under his own music label, Hitt Müzik. Upon its release, the single topped the charts, beating out Mirkelam and Tarık's albums. Selling 500,000 copies, "Kuzu Kuzu" became the best-selling and fastest-selling single of all time in Turkey. A month before the album's release, Tarkan, having completed the album's tracks, had to deal with several photos of himself at a nudist camp being stolen from his home in the US and then released to the press. Tarkan's photos were met with harsh criticism from the press and conservative circles in Turkey, and the vast majority of them did not support the album. These incidents reduced the album's sales in his country by half. At the end of June, he completed the shooting of the music video for "Kuzu Kuzu", the third track on the album, and then went to the USA. He released the music video for the song "Kuzu Kuzu," directed by Metin Arolat, on 2 July 2001. At the same time, he was preparing to give a concert at Aspendos. Archaeologists protested against the concert, which was to be held with the permission of the Ministry of Culture and Tourism, because it could damage the historical structure of the ancient theatre. He gave a launch concert at a famous nightclub in Istanbul on 30 July 2001. He performed three songs from his new album at the concert, which was broadcast live on Kanal D.

Following the launch, he released the album, Karma, on 1 August 2001. The album, of which 650,000 copies had been made, sold out in a single day. Reaching one million copies in its first two weeks, the album achieved great success and became the best-selling album of the year. The album cover, featuring marbling art, was highly praised. Tarkan, who began giving concerts alongside the album, was criticized for the scenes in the music video for his song "Hüp", released on 7 October 2001. During the same period, he appeared in a series of Turkcell commercials shot by Sinan Çetin in Cappadocia. He played the character of "free child" in the commercial, co-starring Nil Karaibrahimgil. Yiğit Özşener was later also featured in the commercial for the Ready Card line. The song "Özgürlük İçimizde", which he sang in the commercial, was released as a single on 14 March 2002. He adapted the lyrics of the song "Taş" from the album into a national team anthem for the 2002 FIFA World Cup, which began on 31 May 2002. The song, "Bir Oluruz Yolunda", was released as a single on 19 April 2002, and received great acclaim. In October 2002, he shot two music videos for his song "Verme". The first video was released on 22 October 2002. The second video clip, shot with 5 children, was released on 12 November.

== Recording ==
Approximately three and a half years after the success of his third album, Ölürüm Sana (1997), Tarkan began recording his fourth. The recording sessions, which began in November 2000, were held at six different studios. Özgür Buldum conducted the recordings at Erekli Tunç Studio in Istanbul, with Serkan Kula serving as tonmeister. Ken Lewis and John Weston served as tonmeisters at Cutting Room in New York. Ken Deranteriasian and Murat Matthew Erdem served as tonmeisters at Studio Pacifique in Los Angeles. Frank Reidilich, Frederic Blanc Garin, and Murat Matthew Erdem served as tonmeisters at Miraval Studios in Le Val, France. Frank Reidilich served as tonmeister at Studio Etap in Cairo. The track "Hüp" was recorded at İmaj Studios in Istanbul. After six months of recording, he released the third track from the album, "Kuzu Kuzu", as a single on 17 May 2001. Selling over 500,000 copies, the single achieved great sales figures and became the fastest and best-selling single of all time in Turkey. The song "Ay" was released with a music video at the launch concert broadcast live on television on 30 July 2001. The album was released under the title Karma on 1 August 2001. He worked with a large team during the recording of the album, which was released through his own label, Hitt Müzik, as well as İstanbul Plak. Tarkan wrote the lyrics for six of the twelve tracks on the album. The lyrics and music for two songs, "Hüp" and "Her Nerdeysen", were written by Nazan Öncel. The lyrics for "Uzak", "O'na Sor", and "Verme" were written by Mete Özgencil. Özgencil composed the music for "Uzak" with Hüsna Arslan. Tarkan composed the music for "O'na Sor". He composed the music for "Aşk" with Ozan Çolakoğlu. The sixth track on the album, "Yandım", was written and composed by Mazhar Alanson. Alanson also recorded this song in his album titled Türk Lokumuyla Tatlı Rüyalar, which was released on 19 April 2002.

The album was produced by Ozan Çolakoğlu and Tarkan. Ozan Çolakoğlu also took part in the arrangement and programming, and the album's photography and concept are by Sevil Sert. The lineup included Jannick Top, İsmail Soyberk, and Avo Harutunian on bass guitar, Erdinç Şenyaylar, Michael Annas Allaf, and Erdem Sökmen on guitar, Bilgehan Tuncer on acoustic and electric guitar, Jean Louis Solon on twelve-string guitar, Jeffrey Slatnick on didgeridoo, sarod, and sitar, Mohsen Allaam on accordion, Hossam Ramzy, Marc Chontereau, Cengiz Ercümer, Seyfi Ayta, and Luis Conte on percussion, the Hossam Ramzy String Group, Armen Aharonian Los Angeles Strings, Orchestra Opera De Marseille, and the Şenyaylar String Group on strings, Laurence Monti on violin, Jean Louis Solon on laúd, Jean Claude Latic on English horn, Muhammed Fouda on ney, Ahmet Koç and Çetin Akdeniz on bağlama, Bülent Altınbaş on clarinet, Yıldıran Güz on oud, and Ruben Harutunian on whistle. The album, conducted by Rene Perinelli and Ozan Çolakoğlu, featured backing vocalists such as Berna Keser, Cihan Okan, Özkan Uğur, Özlem Tekin, Deniz Seki and Murat Matthew Erdem.

== Track listing ==
No.	Title	Writer(s)	Composer(s)	Length
1.	"Aşk"	Tarkan	Tarkan, Ozan Çolakoğlu	4:27
2.	"Ay"	Tarkan	Tarkan	4:19
3.	"Kuzu Kuzu"	Tarkan	Tarkan	3:54
4.	"Gitti Gideli"	Tarkan	Tarkan	4:44
5.	"Uzak"	Mete Özgencil	Mete Özgencil, Hüsna Arslan	4:58
6.	"Yandım"	Mazhar Alanson	Mazhar Alanson	3:13
7.	"O'na Sor"	Mete Özgencil	Tarkan	3:22
8.	"Hüp"	Nazan Öncel	Nazan Öncel	4:41
9.	"Sen Başkasın"	Tarkan	Tarkan	4:15
10.	"Taş"	Tarkan	Tarkan	4:27
11.	"Her Nerdeysen"	Nazan Öncel	Nazan Öncel	3:27
12.	"Verme"	Mete Özgencil	Mete Özgencil	4:58

== Personnel ==
- Vocals - Tarkan (all tracks)
- Producer - Tarkan, Ozan Çolakoğlu
- Arrangement, programming and keyboards – Ozan Çolakoğlu
- Marbleization artist - Hikmet Barutçugil
- Photographs, concept - Sevil Sert
- Director - Özgür Buldum
- Sound engineer - Frank Reidilich, Frederic Blanc Garin, John Weston, Ken Deranteriasian, Ken Lewis, Murat Matthew Erdem and Serkan Kula
- Assistant sound engineer - Chandler Bridges, Deshaun Washington, Keith Armstrong, Myriam Correge
- Mastering - Murat Matthew Erdem, Ulaş Ağçe
- Mixing - Brad Gilderman, Murat Matthew Erdem (8), Ulaş Ağçe (8)
- Mixing (assistant) – Michael Huff
- Production manager - Michael Lang
- Bass guitar - Jannick Top, İsmail Soyberk and Avo Harutunian
- Guitar - Erdinç Şenyaylar, Michael Annas Allaf and Erdem Sökmen
- Acoustic guitar - Bilgehan Tuncer
- Electric guitar - Bilgehan Tuncer
- 12 string guitar - Jean Louis Solon
- Didgeridoo - Jeffrey Slatnick
- Sarod - Jeffrey Slatnick
- Sitar - Jeffrey Slatnick
- Accordion - Mohsen Allaam
- Percussion - Hossam Ramzy, Marc Chontereau, Cengiz Ercümer, Seyfi Ayta and Luis Conte
- String instruments - Hossam Ramzy Yaylı Grubu, Armen Aharonian Los Angeles Strings, Orchestra Opera De Marseille and Şenyaylar Yaylı Grubu
- Violin - Laurence Monti
- Laúd - Jean Louis Solon
- English horn - Jean Claude Latic
- Ney - Muhammed Fouda
- Bağlama - Ahmet Koç and Çetin Akdeniz
- Clarinet - Bülent Altınbaş
- Oud - Yıldıran Güz
- Düdük - Ruben Harutunian
- Orchestra chief - Rene Perinelli and Ozan Çolakoğlu
- Back vocals - Berna Keser, Cihan Okan, Özkan Uğur, Özlem Tekin, Deniz Seki and Murat Matthew Erdem

== Awards ==
Year	Award	Category	Result
2001	29th Golden Butterfly Awards	Best Male Soloist of Turkish Pop Music	Won
2001	29th Golden Butterfly Awards	Best Music Video ("Hüp")	Won
2001	29th Golden Butterfly Awards	Honor Award	Won
2002	8th Kral TV Video Music Awards	Best Male Pop Singer	Won
2002	8th Kral TV Video Music Awards	Best Song ("Kuzu Kuzu")	Won
2002	8th Kral TV Video Music Awards	Best Composition	Nominated
2002	8th Kral TV Video Music Awards	Best-Selling Album	Won
2002	Magazine Journalists Association Golden Objective Awards	Artist of the Year	Won
2002	Magazine Journalists Association Golden Objective Awards	Album of the Year	Won
