= Özgürlük İçimizde =

Single by Tarkan
- Released: 2002
- Recorded: 2002
- Genre: Pop
- Length: 4:02 (original version); 3:22 (Ozinga alternative version)
- Label: Hazır Kart
- Songwriter: Tarkan
- Producers: Ozan Çolakoğlu, Murat Matthew Erdem, Tarkan

Tarkan singles chronology
"Hüp" (2001)	"Özgürlük İçimizde" (2002)	"Bir Oluruz Yolunda" (2002)

"Özgürlük İçimizde" ("Freedom Is Within Us") is a 2002 single by the Turkish pop singer Tarkan. It was released as part of Turkcell's advertising campaign and wasn't sold in stores separately. The campaign consisted of TV adverts, calendar and phone card designs, using the concept that a phone enables a person to travel free in nature and still keep in touch. This single was only released in cassette format.

== Track listing ==
- Özgürlük İçimizde, 2002
1. Özgürlük İçimizde Orijinal Versiyon (4:02)
2. Özgürlük İçimizde Ozinga Alternatif Versiyon (3:22)

== Personnel ==
- Written by Tarkan
- Ozan Çolakoğlu: Arrangement, keyboard, programming, record (1) and mix (1)
- Murat Matthew Erdem: Record (2) and mix (2)
- Ercan Irmak: Ney
- Nurkan Renda: Guitars
- Studio and record at Sarı Ev
