= Metamorfoz =

2007 album

Studio album by Tarkan
- Released: December 25, 2007 (Turkey)
- Genres: Pop, Crunk
- Labels: Urban, Megaliner Records, Universal Music, Астра, Hitt Müzik, DMC
- Producers: Ozan Çolakoğlu, Tarkan

Tarkan chronology
Come Closer (2006)	Metamorfoz (2007)	Metamorfoz Remixes (2008)

Singles from Metamorfoz
- 1. "Vay Anam Vay" Released: December 28, 2007; 2. "Pare Pare" Released: April 17, 2008; 3. "Arada Bir" Released: June 13, 2008; 4. "Dilli Düdük" Released: August 29, 2008

Metamorfoz (Metamorphosis) is the renowned Turkish pop singer Tarkan's sixth studio album, which was released on December 25, 2007, in Turkey. The album was published in Europe and Asia.

Seven of the songs were written by Tarkan, while three others are collaborations with composer Ozan Çolakoğlu. The style and genre of the album is a brand new style, according to the official website, that would surprise fans and critics alike.

The album evoked mixed reviews in the Turkish media, according to some journalists this is his worst album, while others think that these reviews are part of a negative campaign, aiming to discredit Tarkan. Despite the bad criticism he had received, Metamorfoz sold 300,000 copies in the first week of its release, which, according to the Turkish music industry, gaining diamond certification.

Metamorfoz was released in Europe on February 1, 2008, by Urban (Universal Records), in a few countries like Germany and Austria. The European release is an enhanced CD that includes the music video of "Vay Anam Vay".

== Background ==
Tarkan's last Turkish language album was Dudu, in 2003. His first English language work, Come Closer did not bring satisfactory results when compared to the sales of his previous albums. It did not even reach gold sales, according to the list published by MÜ-YAP (Turkish Phonographic Institute). After the failure of Come Closer Tarkan decided to release a new, Turkish album and in the beginning of 2007 he declared that he was working on new songs. However, release dates were continuously being postponed. The Turkish daily Hürriyet reported that the album would be released around Ramadan Fest, the three-day celebration after the Islamic fasting month of Ramadan. It was rumoured that the first single would be called Biraz Nezaket (A Little Courtesy), written by Sezen Aksu. Tarkan denied this in an interview given at the Atatürk International Airport in Istanbul, declaring that release was delayed and the Sezen Aksu song was taken off the track list.

== Album ==
Metamorfoz was finally released in Turkey on December 25, 2007, one day after its announced release date, while it came out on February 1, 2008 in Europe. Seven of the songs were written by Tarkan, three are collaborations with producer-composer Ozan Çolakoğlu. Metamorfoz means metamorphosis, transformation or change in English. The title indicates that musically Metamorfoz is different from Tarkan's previous works. The cover pictures Tarkan with unusually short hair, in a shiny grey suit, an image unfamiliar to his fans, which also justifies the title of the album. The cover features the title in Braille dots for the visually impaired. In the first edition of the cover the Braille title was printed wrong and read Tarkaf instead of Tarkan. It was soon corrected and the cover reprinted.

The style of the album is a mix of heavy electropop with dance and rock; extensive use of samples, electric guitars thrown here and there, synthesizers and keyboards. Oriental percussion and strings sounds are given a minor role compared to his previous albums. Some journalists compared the style to that of Justin Timberlake and Britney Spears songs Toxic and Piece of Me, "mixed with some oriental sauce to make it slide easier".

=== Songs ===
From the songs Vay Anam Vay, Dilli Düdük, Arada Bir, Hop Hop, Çat Kapı and Dedikodu are faster dance songs, Bam Teli and Gün gibi are somewhat slower, while İstanbul Ağlıyor and Pare Pare are slow ballads.

The story of the songs were told by Tarkan himself in an interview for the magazine Yeni Aktüel.

- As told by Tarkan, Vay Anam Vay was born when he was working in the studio on another song. He wrote it in two hours and together with Çolakoğlu they found it so good that they decided to adjust the other songs to its style, removing nonconforming songs from the track list. Thus the album's "metamorphic" style was determined by Vay Anam Vay.
- Dilli Düdük was written one and a half years ago, when Tarkan went through a difficult period in his life. "I wrote it when again the fruits of my work were unjustly stoned and muddied. In the same period one of my colleagues became a victim of such unfair attacks, as well. This time I really got angry. I wrote this song for those who break people's heart without thinking first, who make a mountain out of a molehill with their words."
- Çat Kapı explains the singer's helplessness towards love, a feeling he has experienced multiple times. He makes a decision not to fall in love again, but then he cannot resist the feeling.
- The song Hop Hop has political tones. It describes how the states exploit the citizens for their own purposes, how today's political systems are good for nothing, since the world is full of violence, war, human rights are many times oppressed, we are a subject to global warming and governments do little to save us. Tarkan explained in the interview that the song examines these problems and encourages people to unite, no matter what color our skin is or what religion we follow.
- Tarkan made the following comment on Pare Pare in Yeni Aktüel:

In this song, I wanted to open my heart in its deepest and purest form. I wanted to share the self of me that looks so different when watched from outside but in reality is torn by storms. Of course, everyone has their own story. There should not be any prejudice towards anyone. What you project to the world and what you really are is different, I just wanted to put a reminder of that.

- Gün Gibi is the confession of a man in love, thanking love. It is "the happy song of the nightingale that found his rose".
- İstanbul Ağliyor was written for those, who have already experienced the pain of separation and loneliness, so that they know they are not alone.
- Arada Bir is a self-evaluating song, a confession that shows how Tarkan had experienced so-called "double relationships", which - according to him - are part of mankind's nature: at first everyone only cares for their own self, searches their own truth, but in the end if we are able to understand we were wrong, we can restore balance in the relationship.
- Bam Teli is about the psychological games involved in human relationships, when people often hurt each other, sometimes leaving incurable wounds behind. In this song Tarkan advises not to get involved in such games, sometimes we should just keep silent, show understanding and acceptance of the other and leave things to time.
- Dedikodu is a song protesting against gossips. The singer asks his audience to believe in his art rather than listen to fame and money-hunting gossips and false news projected mainly by the media.

== Reception ==
First week after its release, Metamorfoz sold 300.000 copies, and was in high position on charts (as of January 2008). Besides, he was awarded with a special appreciation from the Turkish Language Association (Türk Dil Kurumu), the president of the institute sent him a congratulation on his lyrics, appreciating how it cultivates the customs of the Turkish language, using several unique idioms and sayings, showing a great example to young people in preserving their mother tongue. Ecevit Kılıç, the columinst of Sabah newspaper called Tarkan the "Orhan Pamuk of music", who follows his own ways no matter what, just like the Nobel laurate writer. In the meantime, according to the daily Vatan, Metamorfoz "exploded like a bomb" on the music market, having sold 300.000 hard copies, while there were 49.000 Tarkan-related downloads from TTNetMüzik within a week, an internet site as the only one, where Tarkan's songs can legally be downloaded free of charge in MP3 format by subscribers of the internet service provider TTNet in Turkey.

The album has received mixed reviews from the Turkish media. Some journalists defended Tarkan saying that critics should be engaged in discussing his music rather than his dressing style, which characterized most of the publicism that appeared in connection with the release. Columnist Tuna Serim pointed out in one of her articles that there was a definite hunt for Tarkan news in the Turkish media, channels were ready to change their original schedules to feature Tarkan-related news, which are considered to be of primary importance. She also pointed out that the release of a music video is not given primary coverage in television news programmes in any country, while the release of "Vay Anam vay" was featured and discussed in the news programmes in Turkey. Cengiz Semercioğlu of Hürriyet thinks that there is an "anti-Tarkan lobby" in the domestic press, which might have resulted from the fact that the singer keeps a certain distance from the yellow press, so whatever he does, the press is going to tear into pieces with criticism. In other journalists and critics' opinion this is the worst album he has ever made, repeats himself and there is nothing original in it. There was one critic who refused to comment on the album or even to listen to it. Others do not otherstand what other critics find unacceptable in the album.

Tolga Akyıldız, a popular columnist for Hürriyet, made a comment on Metamorfoz only two months after the release, saying that he wanted to wait until such daily slanders fade away like the claim that Tarkan "stole" his image from an artist of the Erol Köse label. Akyıldız declared that he "cannot stomach it any more". According to him the album is good, the songs are good but it would be high time that Tarkan were braver:

To be frank, at first Metamorfoz reminded me how good Tarkan is at songwriting. A large section of the songs that make up the album are good songs. The album's music producer, Ozan Çolakoğlu, is to world standards in my opinion. Can Şengün on guitar, he is a maestro. So where's the problem? The problem is in the sound. Possibly in the fact that he didn't give complete control of the arena of sound to Çolakoğlu, that Tarkan wasn't brave enough. When I first listened to "Vay Anam Vay", I thought the electronic, dance baseline was a step in the right direction. However, I realised after listening to the album as a whole that tarkan simply can't risk breaking away from himself. I don't see a need to mention the songs. Ultimately it's a Tarkan album, it has good songs, it will hold, sell, that's a different issue. [...] the real issue is that tarkan needs to overtake himself now. There's no need to be his own best impersonation, there's a lot of those impersonators about. Now it's time to break new ground, to risk losing his dominance and take a brave new step. We see the first seeds of this in Metamorfoz but Tarkan needs to be more resolved. If only to give the album's name its proper due...

According to Hürriyet, the third most searched for words in the online dictionary of the Turkish Language Institute in January 2008 was "metamorfoz".

The first of foreign radios to air Metamorfoz was the Persian Javan Radio in Washington, D.C., United States; because of demand from the audience.

=== European release ===
Metamorfoz was released by Urban (a Universal Music company) on February 1, 2008 in Germany. The album was published in a special format, which contains the music video of "Vay Anam Vay".

== Music videos ==
=== Vay Anam Vay ===
The video was shot in 2007 in the studios of 'İstanbul Film Sokağı', the director was Kıvanç Baruönü, who is known as the special effects master for the top hit Turkish sci-fi movie, G.O.R.A. starring Cem Yılmaz. The shooting lasted one day, the video was mainly made with bluescreen techniques. Tarkan's partner in the video is Liraz Dror. "Vay Anam Vay" went on air on January 15, 2008 in Turkey.

Just like the cover art, the music video of "Vay Anam Vay" is dominated by grey colors, which is only broken by the dark red color of the stage curtains. The video is without a storyline, Tarkan can be seen in several spots singing, with Liraz Dror in the background on a screen. First, he is seen in the middle of a virtual corridor in the same shiny grey suit he wears on the album cover. The second location is an attic, where he is sitting on a white sofa. Then he is dancing in an empty room, wearing black trousers, a black vest, sports shoes and a hat; as well as jeans, a leather coat and a yellow T-shirt with a Bruce Lee motif on it. The fourth location is a virtual stage with dark red curtains, with a screen behind that features Liraz Dror.

=== Pare Pare ===
Contrary to previous news that the second video clip of Metamorphoz was to be made for the song "Dilli Düdük", a music video for "Pare Pare" was eventually broadcast on Turkish television channels. The video was directed by Altan Dönmez, who had recorded several of Tarkan's music videos (including Gülümse Kaderine, Sorma Kalbım). Filming took place for one day at Istanbul's Ata Studios. Similar to "Vay Anam Vay", "Pare Pare" is an emotional video, in which Tarkan sings a slow, emotional song on a smoke-covered stage.

=== Arada Bir ===
The third music video of the album was completely kept secret, and the song title was revealed to fans just days before the June 12, 2008 release. The clip of "Arada Bir" was shot on a road in Kırklarel. During the two-day filming of the dangerous scenes (including jumping from the van to the top of another car), the singer was replaced by a double. In the video, which was directed by Metin Arolat, Tarkan drives a red van and tries to convince his beloved of his love. The post-production of the video, including the graphics, took fifteen days. The music video was initially only available on the official website.

=== Dilli Düdük ===
Metamorfoz's fourth music video was made for the song "Dilli Düdük". It was directed by Murat Onbul. Preparations, filming, and post-production took three months, and the video was made using bluebox technology in HD with a 120-frame storyboard. The entire background, as well as the vehicles and buildings in the clip, were computer graphics, with a crew of 35 working on the visuals.

== Concerts ==
Tarkan's first concert abroad to promote Metamorfoz was held in the Wembley Arena in London on April 13, 2008, where his special guest was the Turkish nu metal band maNga. As announced at his own official website, another international concert was scheduled on May 10 and 11, 2008 in Baku, Azerbaijan.

== Track listing ==
#	Song	Composer	Lyricist	Time
1	Vay Anam Vay	Tarkan, Ozan Çolakoğlu	Tarkan	4:05
2	Dilli Düdük	Tarkan	Tarkan	3:38
3	Arada Bir	Tarkan	Tarkan	4:09
4	İstanbul Ağlıyor	Tarkan	Tarkan	4:50
5	Hop Hop	Tarkan	Tarkan	4:23
6	Dedikodu	Tarkan	Tarkan	4:21
7	Bam Teli	Tarkan	Tarkan	4:36
8	Gün Gibi	Tarkan	Tarkan	4:59
9	Çat Kapı	Tarkan, Ozan Çolakoğlu	Tarkan	3:36
10	Pare Pare	Ozan Çolakoğlu	Tarkan	5:15

== Personnel ==
- Producer: Ozan Çolakoğlu, Tarkan
- Audio engineering: Ozan Çolakoğlu
- Mix: Ozan Çolakoğlu
- Recording, edit and mix: Murat Matthew Erdem
- Studio: Sarı Ev, Imaj
- Mastering: Miles Showell / Metropolis Group Ltd.
- Photography: Tamer Yılmaz
- Hair: Yıldırım Özdemir
- Make-up: Neriman Eröz
- Artwork: İsmail Aylakcı, Onur Güngör
- Edition: Hande Menekşe
- Printing: GD Ofset

=== Musicians ===
- Electric guitar: Can Şengün
- Acoustic guitar: Can Şengün, Michael Annas Allaf
- Bass guitar: Alp Ersönmez
- Strings: String ensemble Gündem
- Percussions: Mehmet Akatay

== Certifications ==
Certifications for Metamorfoz
Region	Certification	Certified units/sales
Turkey (Mü-Yap)	Diamond	300,000^{*}
^{*} Sales figures based on certification alone.

== Release history ==
Region	Date
Turkey	December 25, 2007
Germany	February 1, 2008
Europe	February 8, 2008

== Metamorfoz Remixes ==
Metamorfoz Remixes

Remix album by Tarkan
- Released: 15 July 2008 (Digital); 2 August 2008 (CD)
- Recorded: 2008
- Genres: Pop, dance
- Labels: Urban, Megaliner Records, Universal Music, Астра, Hitt Müzik, DMC

Tarkan chronology
Metamorfoz (2007)	Metamorfoz Remixes (2008)	Adımı Kalbine Yaz (2010)

Singles from Metamorfoz Remixes
- 1. "Çat Kapı (Hökenek Mix)" Released: 27 September 2008

#	Song	Remix by	Time
1	Pare Pare (Tiësto Mix)	Tiësto	11:31
2	Vay Anam Vay (Electrofied Mix)	Kıvanç Kutlumuş & Omar Basaad	5:49
3	Arada Bir (Be Funkee Mix)	Levent Gündüz	4:10
4	İstanbul Ağlıyor (Hökenek Mix)	Serkan Hökenek	4:54
5	Dilli Düdük (Suat Ateşdağlı & Yalçın Aşan Mix)	Suat Ateşdağlı & Yalçın Aşan	4:48
6	Vay Anam Vay (Erdem Kınay Mix)	Erdem Kınay	4:36
7	Dedikodu (Ozan Doğulu Mix)	Ozan Doğulu	4:14
8	Arada Bir (Ozinga Mix)	Ozan Çolakoğlu	4:53
9	Vay Anam Vay (Gürcell Mix)	Gürsel Çelik	3:57
10	Çat Kapı (Hökenek Mix)	Serkan Hökenek	4:26
11	Hop Hop (Kivanch K. Gangsta Mix)	Kıvanç Kutlumuş	5:24
12	Vay Anam Vay (Elektherock Mix)	Hüseyin Karadayı	5:11
13	İstanbul Ağlıyor (Murat Matthew Erdem Mix)	Murat Matthew Erdem	4:24
