= Ozan Çolakoğlu =

Turkish musical artist (born 1972)

- Born: 1 April 1972 (age 54); Adana, Turkey
- Other name: Ozinga
- Occupations: Composer; record producer; arranger; orchestrator; film composer; audio engineer
- Spouses: Ece ? (div.); Gülşen (m. 2016)
- Children: 2
- Musical career
- Genres: Pop; arabesque; adult contemporary; pop rock; dance-pop
- Instruments: Keyboards; drums
- Years active: 1991–present
- Labels: HITT Production; Urban; Universal; İstanbul Plak; DMC; Avrupa
- Website: OzanColakoglu.com

Ozan Çolakoğlu (Turkish pronunciation: [oˈzan ˈtʃoɫakoːɫu], born 1 April 1972) is a Turkish composer, songwriter and music producer; famous for his work with various Turkish pop singers and his multiple film scores. He co-founded Sarı Ev (Yellow House) production company but left in 2010 to work for dB Müzik.

== Life and career ==
Ozan Çolakoğlu was born in Adana, Turkey, in 1972. He attended the Berklee College of Music and his career started with Tarkan's first album called Yine Sensiz. Besides working continuously with the Turkish pop idol, he also contributed to the albums of notable artists like Nil Karaibrahimgil, Murat Boz or the well-known all-female Turkish rock band, Pin-up. In the music world, he is also known for his remixes under the name Ozinga.

He arranged "Every Way That I Can", the song Sertab Erener won the Eurovision contest with. Years later, he would arrange another Eurovision hit, "Düm Tek Tek," written by his friend Sinan Akçıl.

Ozan Çolakoğlu is also credited for co-writing several of Tarkan's songs, including the second (European) version of "Şımarık."

Apart from Tarkan, he worked for Nilüfer (albums Karar Verdim and Hayal, single "Zalimin Kararı"), Bendeniz, Deniz Seki, Nil Karaibrahimgil, Ümit Sayın, Pınar Aylin, Gökçe, Yaşar, Çelik Erişçi, Özgün, Kızlar, Tan Taşçi (song "İşaret"), Sibel Can (song "Çantada Keklik"), Gülşen (complete album Önsöz). His works include the scores of popular movies like G.O.R.A., Sınav or Organize İşler.

== Discography ==
Studio albums

- 01 (2012) (sales: 72,998)

== Collaborations with other artists ==
=== Albums ===
Year	Title/Artist	Task	Instrument played
1992	Yine Sensiz / Tarkan (Without You Again)	Music direction, arrangements	
1994	A-Acayipsin / Tarkan (Oh You're Something Else)	Mixing Arrangement	Piano
1997	Ölürüm Sana / Tarkan (I'd die for you)	Arrangement	Keyboard
2001	Karma / Tarkan	String Composition & Orchestration, mixing, co-producer, arrangements	
2003	Dudu / Tarkan (Woman)	Producer, arrangements	
2006	Come Closer / Tarkan	Programming, drum programming	Keyboards
2006	Tek Taşımı Kendim Aldım / Nil Karaibrahimgil (I Bought My Diamond Myself)	Producer, remixes, arrangements	
2007	Maximum / Murat Boz	Producer, arrangements	
2007	Metamorfoz / Tarkan	Producer, arrangements, songwriter	
2010	Adımı Kalbine Yaz / Tarkan	Producer, arrangements, songwriter	

=== Singles ===
Year	Title/Artist	Task
2001	Kuzu Kuzu / Tarkan (Like a Lamb)	Producer, remixes arrangements
2002	Bir Oluruz Yolunda / Tarkan (We'll Unite On Your Way)	Producer, arrangements
2002	Özgürlük İçimizde / Tarkan (Freedom Within Us)	Producer, remixes, arrangements
2003	Every Way That I Can / Sertab Erener	Producer, arrangements
2005	Ayrılık Zor / Tarkan (Separation Is Hard)	Producer, remixes, arrangements
2006	Aşkı Bulamam Ben / Murat Boz (I Can't Find Love)	Producer, remix, arrangements
2012	Aşk Gitti Bizden / Tarkan (Our Love is Gone)	Producer, remixes, arrangements
2012	Hadi Bakalım / Tarkan (Alright Then)	Producer, remixes, arrangements

=== Remixes ===
Song title	Album / Single	Artist
Aşkı Bulamam Ben (Ozimga mix) (I Can't Find Love)	Maximum	Murat Boz
Bounce (Ozinga)	Come Closer / Bounce single	Tarkan
Dudu (Ozinga Mix) (Woman)	Dudu	Tarkan
Hüp (Ozinga Disco Mix)	Karma / Hüp single	Tarkan
Kuzu Kuzu (Ozinga Mix) (Like a Lamb)	Karma / Kuzu Kuzu single	Tarkan
Özgürlük İçimizde (Ozinga Alternatif Verziyon) (Freedom Within Us)	Özgürlük İçimizde promo single	Tarkan
Pırlanta (Organize Remix) (Diamond)	Tek Taşımı Kendim Aldım (I Bought My Diamond Myself)	Nil Karaibrahimgil
Sheep (Ozinga Latin Mix)	Are You Satisfied?	Rebel Moves

== Film scores ==
Year	Title
2005	G.O.R.A.
2006	Hokkabaz (The Magician)
2006	Organize İşler (Organized Job)
2006	Sınav (The Exam)
