= Ayrılık Zor =

Single by Tarkan
- Released: 2005
- Recorded: 2005
- Genre: Pop
- Length: 4:05 (Ayrılık Zor Original Version only)
- Label: Avea
- Songwriter(s): Tarkan
- Producer(s): Ozan Çolakoğlu, Tarkan

Tarkan singles chronology
"Bir Oluruz Yolunda" (2002)	"Ayrılık Zor" (2005)	"Bounce" (2005)

"Ayrılık Zor" ("Separation is Hard") is a single released by the Turkish pop singer Tarkan in 2005 and sold close to half a million copies. It was released as part of Turkish phone company Avea's new cell phone deal. The single was not available in stores, but was purchased by subscribing to Avea. The concept involved lovers separated by distance using the phone as a means of contact.

== Track list ==
- Ayrılık Zor, 2005
1. Ayrılık Zor Original Version (4:05)
2. Ayrılık Zor Hakan Özgen Mix (3:49)
3. Ayrılık Zor Murat Mathew Erdem Mix (3:50)
4. Ayrılık Zor Ozinga Melankoli mix (3:36)
5. Ayrılık Zor Ozinga Pop Alaturka Mix (3:33)
6. Ayrılık Zor Serkan Dincer Mix (3:52)

== See also ==
- Turkish pop music
