= Geççek =

Song by Turkish singer Tarkan

Single by Tarkan
- Language: Turkish
- Released: 17 February 2022
- Length: 3:14
- Label: Hitt Müzik
- Songwriter: Tarkan
- Producer: Ozan Çolakoğlu

Tarkan singles chronology
| "Her Şey Fani (Mahmut Orhan Remix)" (2019) | "Geççek" (2022) | "Yap Bi Güzellik" (2022) |

"Geççek" (Turkish: This shall pass) is a song of the Turkish singer Tarkan. Released in February 2022, it has garnered quite some attention not only from his fans, but also in the Turkish political spectrum, both, politicians from the government as well as the opposition have commented on it due to speculations of alleged criticism on the current government. The song has been written by Tarkan himself, and inspired by the difficult times he experienced during the COVID-19 pandemic.

== Production ==
The lyrics and melody of the song are from Tarkan, while Ozan Çolakoğlu was responsible for its production. The director of the song's video clip was İrfan Yıldırım.

== Release ==
After its release was announced by Tarkan on Twitter the song was released on Tarkan's YouTube channel on 17 February 2022 and by the next day has been viewed over 4 million times. It was Tarkan's first major release in five years.

== Political comments ==
The references to the final days of a difficult time have caused politicians to speculate around a possible political message ahead of the upcoming general elections in 2023. Opposition politicians such as Meral Akşener of the right-wing Good Party (İyi Party), Hüda Kaya of the Peoples' Democratic Party (HDP) or Veli Ağbaba of the Republican People's Party (CHP) have supported the song, commenting on him on social media. Journalists supporting the Government have alleged the song was written in Pennsylvania in reference to Fethullah Gülen's residency there. Alpay Özalan of the Governing Justice and Development Party (AKP) accused the opposition of having made use of Tarkan as their troll while not being able to govern a country and Metin Özkan from the Nationalist Movement Party (MHP) suspected the HDP of having had something to do with the song.

== Charts ==
Chart performance for "Geççek"
| Chart (2022) | Peak position |
|---|---|
| Global 200 (Billboard) | 121 |
