= 10 (Tarkan album) =

2017 album by Tarkan

Studio album by Tarkan
- Released: 15 March 2017
- Studio: Ozinga · Kaya Müzik
- Genre: Pop
- Length: 64:01
- Label: Hitt · DMC
- Producer: Tarkan · Ozan Çolakoğlu

Tarkan chronology
Ahde Vefa (2016)	10 (2017)	Kuantum 51 (2024)

10 is the tenth album by Turkish singer Tarkan. It was released on 15 June 2017 by HITT Production and distributed by DMC.

== Release and content ==
Tarkan's tenth studio album, 10, is a Turkish pop album. It contains 14 songs in total. The album sold 330,000 copies in 20 days and earned the singer ₺32 million.

== Track listing ==
10
No.	Title	Writer(s)	Composer(s)	Length
1.	"Yolla"	Tarkan	Tarkan, Ozan Çolakoğlu	4:46
2.	"Çay Simit"	Gülşah Tütüncü	Gülşah Tütüncü	4:13
3.	"Beni Çok Sev"	Günay Çoban	Serkan İzzet Özdoğan	4:17
4.	"Ben Senin..."	Sezen Aksu	Sezen Aksu	3:52
5.	"Çok Ağladım"	Ayça Zeynep Aydın	Murat Matthew Erdem	4:33
6.	"Her Şey Fani"	Sezen Aksu	Sezen Aksu	5:38
7.	"Kedi Gibi"	Tarkan	Tarkan	4:09
8.	"Hodri Meydan"	Tarkan	Tarkan	4:20
9.	"Biz Çocukken"	Günay Çoban	Tarkan	5:57
10.	"Bal Küpü"	Günay Çoban	Tarkan	4:14
11.	"Acımasız"	Nazan Öncel	Nazan Öncel	4:16
12.	"Sevdam Tek Nefes"	Aysel Gürel	Tarkan	4:41
13.	"O Sevişmeler"	Ümit Sayın	Ümit Sayın	4:09
14.	"Affedin Bizi Çocuklar"	Tarkan	Tarkan	4:56
Total length:				64:01

== Charts ==
Chart (2017)	Peak position
Belgium (Ultratop)	56
Netherlands (Dutch Charts)	142
Switzerland (Hitparade)	72
Billboard World Albums	4

== Sales ==
Country	Sales
Turkey (MÜ-YAP)	390,000

== Release history ==
Country	Date	Format(s)	Label
Turkey	15 June 2017	CD · Digital download	Hitt Müzik
Worldwide	15 June 2017	Digital download	Hitt Müzik
