= RockA =

Turkish rock band

- Origin: Ankara, Turkey
- Genres: Nu metal, rapcore, alternative rock
- Years active: 2005–present
- Labels: DMC Music Company, RockaBase
- Members: Halil Özüpek, Ömer Uyanık, Enes Evci, Burçin Bülbül
- Website: www.rocka.com.tr

RockA is a Turkish music band, formed in 2005 in Ankara, generally producing works in nu metal, rapcore, alternative rock. Band, with producing amateur works for a long time period found a place in important activities and festivals and published their first major production in 2012 from DMC Music Company. Receiving support from Tarkan with the cover work of Tarkan (singer)'s cult song once affected a time period, published in 1997 Ölürüm Sana and Tarkan (singer)'s accompanying them in their music video turned all the medias eye to RockA in an instant.

== Biography ==
=== 2005–2007 ===
In 2005, in Ankara, a local band that practised punk-rock style under the name "Twister"; by bass guitarist Cem Sönmez' invitation to Halil Özüpek, band both changed their name and music style and RockA was founded. Band, with this new structuring, recorded their first demo in early 2006 and joined between amateur music groups. "Zor" and "Kır Kapıları" named demos were adopted in a very short time by listeners who are interested in amateur music and with being downloaded hundreds of time over the internet laid a foundation to bands self-confidence.

=== 2007–2009 ===
At the beginning of 2007 firstly electric guitarist Barış Ceylan then drummer Ömer Uyanık were included to the band. The band recorded 3 demos with this members in early 2007 (Masal, Aynı Ben Gibi and Kaçarken). These 3 songs that were introduced to the audience through internet obtained bigger success than RockA's previously released demos. So much so that with the proposal that came from Dream TV (Turkey)'s Yüxexes programme at April 2007 a music video was shotto the song Masal. At the same month, first time ever about the band, a news was made in Yüxexes Magazine and RockA met written-visual media.

With 5th member that joined to the band by Halik Özüpek's invitation, Berkay Ertürk (Keyboard-Turntable), the band RockA began to appear more in media. By end of the very same year band entered to the studio for a demo and also in these month particularly with Aktüel, Billboard and Female magazines, interviews were done with many local and international printed media. With the following time period the band took stage in big festivals such as Barışarock 2008 and Rock-A 2008 and also local concerts.

=== 2009–2012 ===
After the album recordings that started in 2009 and finished in 2011 RockA; with the demo cover work of Tarkan's Ölürüm Sana they recorded in 2008 attended to the Miller Music Factory 2010 Competition. They received the second place award in cover category amongst thousands of other bands and were the only band that was invited to the Rock'n Coke 2011 Festival. During this period ways were parted with bass guitarist Cem Sönmez and Yiğit Üney joined to the band. With this member change occurrence and the final stage of album production band re-recorded old cover work of Ölürüm Sana. This recorded work was sent to Tarkan (singer) who is Turkey's most prominent artist and also the owner of the song. Tarkan, with also his great liking and support gave Ölürüm Sana song, which is one of the important steps in Turkish pop music, to RockA without any charge and at the same time period the band signed an album contract with DMC Music Company.

=== 2012–2014 ===
After entering to the year 2012 on one hand while first album works were continuing with DMC Music Company on the other hand the band published their first discographic work on 29 January 2012. Amongst 30 songs that were recorded for the album, Renksiz, Herkes Her Şey and Kaçarken were gathered in an EP and were introduced to the audience in digital platforms under the name Renksiz EP. In the following period in November 2012 Ölürüm Sana single was published under label of DMC Music Company. Band attracted all the attention with this cover work of Tarkan's cult song, that once affected an era, Ölürüm Sana.

While this Ölürüm Sana, published at the end of 2012, singles effects were continuing RockA firstly published a mini album in digital platforms that consisted of 3 songs (Yarın Yok, Aynı Ben Gibi, Kır Kapıları) under the name Yarın Yok EP in 2013 April. After that later in that year debut album "101" met the music lovers with the DMC Music Production label.

=== 2014 – present ===
In 2014 the group entered in a standstill period. Earlier that year ways with Yiğit Üney (Bass Guitar) towards the end of the year with Barış Ceylan (Electric Guitar) and Berkay Ertürk (Keyboard) were parted. At the beginning of the year 2015 Enes Evci (Electric Guitar) and Burçin Bülbül (Bass Guitar) joined to the band. After this period of renewal the band began to their workings actively. Demo versions of songs that were recorded for the album 101 in 2015 June were gathered inside a different album under the name 101 Demo and met with listeners from all digital platforms.

== Band members ==
Current Members

- Halil Özüpek – Vocal, Producer (Since 2005)
- Ömer Uyanık – Drums (Since 2007)
- Enes Evci – Guitars (Since 2015)
- Burçin Bülbül – Bass Guitar (Since 2015)

Former Members

- Cem Sönmez – Bass Guitar (2005–2011)
- Can Eren – Guitars (2005–2007)
- Mustafa Yaşaroğlu – Drums (2005–2006)
- Barış Ceylan – Guitars (2007–2014)
- Berkay Ertürk – Keyboard (2007–2014)
- Yiğit Üney – Bass Guitars (2011–2014)

== Releases ==
=== Renksiz [EP] ===
No	Track	Composer	Lyrics	Producer
1	Intro	Halil Özüpek	Halil Özüpek	Halil Özüpek
2	Renksiz	Halil Özüpek, Barış Ceylan, Berkay Ertürk	Halil Özüpek	Halil Özüpek, Berkay Ertürk, Ömer Uyanık, Barış Ceylan, Cem Sönmez
3	Herkes Her Şey	Halil Özüpek, Barış Ceylan, Berkay Ertürk	Halil Özüpek	Halil Özüpek
4	Kaçarken	Halil Özüpek, Barış Ceylan	Halil Özüpek	Halil Özüpek
5	Herkes Her Şey (Rap Version feat. Hayki)	Halil Özüpek	Halil Özüpek, Aytuğ Tunal	Halil Özüpek
6	Outro	Halil Özüpek	-	Halil Özüpek

=== Ölürüm Sana [Single] ===
No	Track	Composer	Lyrics	Producer
1	Ölürüm Sana	Tarkan (singer)	Tarkan (singer), Halil Özüpek	Halil Özüpek, Barış Ceylan, Ömer Uyanık, Berkay Ertürk
2	Anlatması Zor	Halil Özüpek	Halil Özüpek	Halil Özüpek

=== Yarın Yok [EP] ===
No	Track	Composer	Lyrics	Producer
1	Yarın Yok	Halil Özüpek, Barış Ceylan, Berkay Ertürk	Halil Özüpek	Halil Özüpek
2	Aynı Ben Gibi	Halil Özüpek	Halil Özüpek	Halil Özüpek
3	Kır Kapıları	Halil Özüpek, Can Eren, Cem Sönmez	Halil Özüpek	Halil Özüpek

=== 101 [Albüm] ===
No	Track	Composer	Lyrics	Producer
1	Anlat	Halil Özüpek, Barış Ceylan, Berkay Ertürk	Halil Özüpek	Halil Özüpek
2	Emrin Yeter	Halil Özüpek	Halil Özüpek	Halil Özüpek
3	Masal	Halil Özüpek, Barış Ceylan	Halil Özüpek	Halil Özüpek
4	Maalesef	Halil Özüpek, Barış Ceylan	Halil Özüpek	Halil Özüpek
5	Ben Ağlasam Da	Halil Özüpek, Berkay Ertürk	Halil Özüpek	Halil Özüpek
6	Bir Yerde	Halil Özüpek, Barış Ceylan	Halil Özüpek	Halil Özüpek
7	Koma	Halil Özüpek, Barış Ceylan	Halil Özüpek	Halil Özüpek
8	Yarın Olmayacak	Halil Özüpek, Barış Ceylan, Berkay Ertürk, Ömer Uyanık	Halil Özüpek	Halil Özüpek
9	Zor	Halil Özüpek, Can Eren, Cem Sönmez	Halil Özüpek	Halil Özüpek
10	Anlat (Acoustic)	Halil Özüpek, Barış Ceylan	Halil Özüpek	Halil Özüpek
11	Ölürüm Sana (Bonus Track)	Tarkan	Tarkan, Halil Özüpek	Halil Özüpek, Barış Ceylan, Ömer Uyanık, Berkay Ertürk
12	Anlatması Zor (Bonus Track)	Halil Özüpek	Halil Özüpek	Halil Özüpek

=== 101 Demo [Albüm] ===
No	Track	Composer	Lyrics	Producer
1	Anlat (Demo)	Halil Özüpek, Barış Ceylan, Berkay Ertürk	Halil Özüpek	Halil Özüpek
2	Masal (Demo)	Halil Özüpek, Barış Ceylan	Halil Özüpek	Halil Özüpek
3	Koma (Demo)	Halil Özüpek, Barış Ceylan	Halil Özüpek	Halil Özüpek
4	Kır Kapıları (Demo)	Halil Özüpek, Can Eren, Cem Sönmez	Halil Özüpek	Halil Özüpek
5	Yarın Yok (Demo)	Halil Özüpek, Barış Ceylan, Berkay Ertürk	Halil Özüpek	Halil Özüpek
6	Maalesef (Demo)	Halil Özüpek, Barış Ceylan	Halil Özüpek	Halil Özüpek
7	Ben Ağlasam Da (Demo)	Halil Özüpek, Berkay Ertürk	Halil Özüpek	Halil Özüpek
8	Bir Yerde (Demo)	Halil Özüpek, Barış Ceylan	Halil Özüpek	Halil Özüpek
9	Aynı Ben Gibi (Demo)	Halil Özüpek	Halil Özüpek	Halil Özüpek
10	Yarın Olmayacak (Demo)	Halil Özüpek, Barış Ceylan, Berkay Ertürk, Ömer Uyanık	Halil Özüpek	Halil Özüpek
11	Zor (Demo)	Halil Özüpek, Can Eren, Cem Sönmez	Halil Özüpek	Halil Özüpek
