= Start the Fire (Tarkan song) =

Single by Tarkan

from the album Come Closer
- Released: 18 August 2006
- Recorded: 2005
- Genre: Pop
- Length: 3:15 (Start the Fire Radio Edit only)
- Label: Urban/Universal Music
- Songwriters: Brian Kierulf, Josh Schwartz, Tarkan
- Producers: Brian Kierulf, Josh Schwartz, Tarkan

Tarkan singles chronology
"Bounce" (2005)	"Start the Fire" (2006)	"Uyan" (2008)

"Start the Fire" is Tarkan's second English language single from the album Come Closer, released in 2006.

== CD Releases ==
- Start the Fire, 2006
1. Start The Fire (Original Version)
2. Start The Fire (Mousse T. Radio Mix)
3. Start The Fire (Mousse T. Radio Instrumental)
4. Start The Fire (Bugati Remix)
5. Start the Fire (Bugati Remix Instrumental)
6. Start the Fire (Bugati Remix Acapella)
7. Start the Fire (Fat Tony Crew vs Eniac Remix)
8. Start the Fire (Fat Tony Crew vs Eniac Dub Remix)
9. Start the Fire (Mousse T Abi's Club Mix)
10. Start The Fire (Mousse T Abi's Club Mix Instrumental)

== Charts ==
Chart (2006)	Peak position
Turkey Dance Chart	1
Turkey Top 20 Chart	17
Germany Singles Chart	43
Russian Airplay Chart	8
