= Adımı Kalbine Yaz =

Adimi Kalbine Yaz

Studio album by Tarkan
- Released: 29 August 2010 (Turkey)
- Recorded: November 2009–June 2010
- Studio: Db Müzik; MDM Studio
- Genre: Pop; dance
- Length: 65:09
- Label: HITT; DMC

Tarkan chronology
Metamorfoz Remixes (2008)	Adimi Kalbine Yaz (2010)	Ahde Vefa (2016)

Singles from Adimi kalbine Yaz
- 1. "Sevdanın Son Vuruşu" Released: 11 May 2010

Adimi Kalbine Yaz (Write My Name Across Your Heart) is Turkish pop singer Tarkan's studio album, and was released on 29 July 2010 in Turkey. The album sold more than 300,000 copies in the first week of its release and received the best album of the year award from Kral TV Music Awards.

== Track listing ==
No.	Title	Lyrics	Music	Length
1.	"Sevdanın Son Vuruşu"	Aysel Gürel	Tarkan	5:07
2.	"Acımayacak"	Mithat Can Özer	Mithat Can Özer	4:32
3.	"İşim Olmaz"	Yıldız Tilbe	Yıldız Tilbe	4:13
4.	"Kayıp"	Günay Çoban	Tarkan	4:58
5.	"Öp"	Sezen Aksu · Tarkan	Ozan Çolakoğlu · Tarkan	3:47
6.	"Adımı Kalbine Yaz"	Tarkan	Tarkan	5:12
7.	"Sen Çoktan Gitmişsin"	Sezen Aksu	Ozan Çolakoğlu	4:26
8.	"Usta-Çırak"	Gülşah Tütüncü	Gülşah Tütüncü	3:25
9.	"Acımayacak" (Gürcell Club Mix)	Mithat Can Özer	Mithat Can Özer	4:58
10.	"Adımı Kalbine Yaz" (Ozinga Club Mix)	Tarkan	Tarkan	4:21
11.	"Sevdanın Son Vuruşu" (Suat Ateşdağlı Mix)	Aysel Gürel	Tarkan	5:20
12.	"Öp" (Gürcell Club Mix)	Sezen Aksu · Tarkan	Ozan Çolakoğlu · Tarkan	5:07
13.	"Sevdanın Son Vuruşu" (Kivanch K Mix)	Aysel Gürel	Tarkan	9:43
Total length:				65:09

== Credits ==
- Arranged By – Gülşah Tütüncü (tracks: 8), Gürsel Çelik (tracks: 9, 12), Kivanch K.* (tracks: 13), Ozan Çolakoğlu (tracks: 1 to 8, 10), Suat Ateşdağlı (tracks: 11)
- Mastered By – Emily Lazar (tracks: 1), Joe LaPorta (tracks: 1)
- Mixed By – Levent Demirbaş (tracks: 1, 3, 4, 6, 7), Murat Matthew Erdem (tracks: 5), Yalçın Aşan (tracks: 11), Özgür Yurtoğlu (tracks: 2, 8, 9, 10, 12)
- Photography By – Giuliano Bekor
- Recorded By [Additional Vocals] – Emirhan Cengiz
- Recorded By [Percussions & Strings] – Bahadır Sağbaş (tracks: 3, 6)
- Recorded By, Recorded By [Vocals], Mastered By – Levent Demirbaş
- Words By [Redaction] – Handan Menekşe

== Charts ==
Chart (2010)	Peak position
Turkey (D&R Best-Selling)	1

== Sales ==
Country	Sales
Turkey (MÜ-YAP)	355,000

== Release ==
Country	Date	Format	Label	Ref.
Turkey	28 July 2010	CD · digital download	DMC · Hitt	
Worldwide	28 July 2010	Digital download	DMC · Hitt	
United Kingdom	27 February 2012	CD	DMC · Hitt · GNL · Tonpool	
United States	28 February 2012	CD	DMC · Hitt · GNL · Tonpool	
Germany	28 February 2012	CD	DMC · Hitt · GNL · Tonpool	
France	28 February 2012	CD	DMC · Hitt · GNL · Tonpool	
Spain	28 February 2012	CD	DMC · Hitt · GNL · Tonpool	
