= Sevdanın Son Vuruşu =

Single by Tarkan

from the album Adımı Kalbine Yaz
- Released: 2010
- Recorded: 2010
- Genre: Pop
- Songwriter: Aysel Gürel

Tarkan singles chronology
"Uyan" (2008)	"Sevdanın Son Vuruşu" (2010)	"Kara Toprak" (2011)

"Sevdanın Son Vuruşu" is a 2010 single by Turkish singer Tarkan. The words of the song were written by famous Turkish songwriter Aysel Gürel, who was deceased in 2008. After Aysel Gurel's death, a new tenant had found the song's lyrics left in the apartment. After asking for permission from Gürel's daughter Müjde Ar, Tarkan composed the music and published the song in his 2010 album, Adimi Kalbine Yaz.
