= Bounce (Tarkan song) =

Single by Tarkan

from the album Come Closer
- Released: 25 October 2005 (Turkey)
- Recorded: 2005
- Genre: R&B
- Length: 3:43 (Bounce Radio Edit only)
- Label: HITT Music
- Songwriters: Tarkan, Devrim Karaoğlu, Pete "Boxta" Martin, Elijah Wells, Lionel Bermingham
- Producers: Devrim Karaoğlu, Tarkan

Tarkan singles chronology
"Ayrılık Zor" (2005)	"Bounce" (2005)	"Start The Fire" (2006)

Alternative cover
- Alternate cover used on German single

"Bounce" is Tarkan's debut English language single. It was released in Turkey, his home nation, on 25 October 2005, before being released in Germany on 24 March 2006.

== Domestic Release ==
- Bounce, 2005 / 2006
1. Bounce (Orıgınal) (3:43)
2. Bounce (Pacifique) (3:44)
3. Bounce (Ozinga) (3:40)
4. Shhh (DkEvrim Mix) (3:50)
5. Bounce (Kerim & DkEvrım) (4:20)
6. Shhh (3:35)
7. Bounce (N.Y.L.A.) (3:45)
8. Bounce (Pacifique De Replay Remix)
9. Bounce (Beathoavenz Cut)
10. Bounce (Don Candiani Reggaeton Rmx feat. Adassa)
11. Bounce (Oriental Mix)
12. Bounce (Indu Mix)
13. Bounce (Original Mix)
14. Bounce (Armand Van Helden Mix)
15. Bounce (DJ Fuma's Elastic Mix)

== Extra information 12-inch Releases ==
Along with a promotional vinyl release of the single, there were three 12" versions released for promotional use/club DJs, too.

12-inch Sleeve

12-inch Sleeve

== Charts ==
=== Weekly charts ===
Chart (2005–06)	Peak position
Austria (Ö3 Austria Top 40)	43
CIS Airplay (TopHit)	25
Germany (GfK)	15
Finland (Suomen virallinen lista)	16
Switzerland (Schweizer Hitparade)	60

=== Year-end charts ===
Chart (2006)	Position
CIS (Tophit)	173
