= Ahde Vefa =

Compilation album by Tarkan
- Released: 11 March 2016
- Genre: Classical Turkish
- Length: 49:41
- Label: HITT Production
- Producer: Tarkan

Tarkan chronology
Adımı Kalbine Yaz (2010)	Ahde Vefa (2016)	10 (2017)

Ahde Vefa (Agreements Must Be Kept) is the compilation album by Turkish singer Tarkan. It was released on 11 March 2016 by HITT Production and distributed by DMC. It later received the Best Project award at the 43rd Golden Butterfly Awards.

== Release and content ==
The album is Tarkan's first classical Turkish album. It contains 13 songs in total.

Tarkan has talked about the importance of classical Turkish music and its special place for himself, naming it as an inspiration to find and develop his own music style: “I'm now experiencing a sweet excitement to share this long-awaited album with you. This album has come to life with your influence and contributions. I wish Ahde Vefa removes the dark clouds of your hearts, and fill them instead with love, even if it's for a short moment."

The album was released by iTunes in Latin America and Middle East, alongside 35 other countries including Germany, France, Spain, Austria, Russia, India, Egypt, the United States and Canada. The album topped the ‘World Music Top Charts’ in England, Denmark, the Netherlands, the United States and Germany following its release. It also ranked first on iTunes' "Top Albums" list in Azerbaijan. With this success, Tarkan became the first Turkish artist with the most number of promotions on iTunes worldwide. The album sold 170,000 copies on its first week of release. It became the album with the most number of sales in Turkey after 2010 ( Adımı Kalbine Yaz). The album sold 240,000 copies by April 2016.

== Track listing ==
Ahde Vefa
No.	Title	Writer(s)	Composer(s)	Length
1.	"Rindlerin Akşamı (Dönülmez Akşamın Ufkundayız)"	Yahya Kemal Beyatlı	Münir Nurettin Selçuk	5:08
2.	"Olmaz İlaç Sine-i Sad Pareme"	Namık Kemal	Hacı Arif Bey	3:23
3.	"Söyleme Bilmesinler"	İlkan San	Selahattin Altınbaş	3:29
4.	"Enginde Yavaş Yavaş"	Vecdi Bingöl	Saadeddin Kaynak	3:12
5.	"Nasıl Geçti Habersiz"	Nihat Aşar	Teoman Alpay	4:54
6.	"Kadehinde Zehir Olsa"	Hikmet Münir Ebcioğlu	Erol Sayan	3:30
7.	"Veda Busesi"	Orhan Seyfi Orhon	Yusuf Nalkesen	3:38
8.	"Sevmekten Kim Usanır"	Hikmet Münir Ebcioğlu	Teoman Alpay	3:54
9.	"Aşk Bu Değil Mi"	Mehmet Erdoğan Berker	Mehmet Erdoğan Berker	4:30
10.	"Islak Daha Islak Öp Beni"	Ümit Yaşar Oğuzcan	Rüştü Şardağ	3:45
11.	"Akşam Oldu Hüzünlendim Ben Yine"	Ahmet Zenci Cengizoğlu	Semahat Özdenses	2:56
12.	"Zeytin Gözlüm"	Hüceste Aksavrın	Selahattin İçli	3:19
13.	"Kara Bulutları Kaldır Aradan"	Ramazan Gökalp Arkın	Saadeddin Kaynak	4:03
Total length:				49:41

== Sales ==
Country	Sales
Turkey (MÜ-YAP)	272,500

== Release history ==
Country	Date	Format(s)	Label
Turkey	11 March 2016	CD · digital download	HITT Müzik
Worldwide	11 March 2016	Digital download	HITT Müzik

== See also ==
- List of fastest-selling albums
