= Bir Oluruz Yolunda =

Single by Tarkan
- Released: 2002
- Recorded: 2002
- Genre: Pop
- Length: 4:16 (Bir Oluruz Yolunda Version 1 only)
- Label: İstanbul Plak
- Songwriters: Tarkan, Ozan Varışlı
- Producers: Ozan Çolakoğlu, Tarkan

Tarkan singles chronology
"Özgürlük İçimizde" (2002)	"Bir Oluruz Yolunda" (2002)	"Ayrılık Zor" (2005)

"Bir Oluruz Yolunda" ("We Are United on Your Way") also known as "Milli Takım" is a modified version of the song Taş on Tarkan's previous album Karma. The modifications in the song were made for the Turkish national football team's entry to the 2002 World Cup.

== Track list ==
- Bir Oluruz Yolunda, 2002
1. Bir Oluruz Yolunda Orijinal Version (4:16)
2. Bir Oluruz Yolunda Alternatif Version (4:20)
