= Ahmet Koç =

Turkish musician

- Born: Turkey
- Genres: Turkish folk; pop; rock
- Occupations: Musician; arranger; musicologist
- Instrument: Bağlama
- Employer: Turkish Ministry of Culture

Ahmet Koç is a Turkish bağlama player.

== Before the "Paradoks" ==
Koç appeared and played the bağlama with the female singer Şebnem Paker at Eurovision Song Contest 1997, in Dublin, where they represented Turkey and came in third place. His previous works include his own instrumental works "Yedi Karanfil 3", "Yediveren Anadolu" and "Yol Türküleri, as well as his contributions to a multitude of other artists' albums as music director or bağlama player. Koç continues his career at the Turkish Ministry of Culture as bağlama artist, arranger and musicologist.

== "Paradoks" Era ==
In the spring of 2005, he released his instrumental album Paradoks ('Paradox'), in which he played international pop and rock classics on bağlama. Some of the songs included in his album were "Hasta Siempre", "Fragile", "My Way", "Surf Rider", "Hotel California", "The Godfather Theme", "Shape of My Heart", and "My Heart Will Go On".

== "Sağanak" Era ==
In late 2006, Koç released his fifth album, Sağanak (which means "heavy rain" in Turkish). This new effort is a two-disc set (one is for Turkish songs and the other part, as is with Paradoks, is for international hits). The first single released from the album was "Görevimiz Tehlike" (theme to Mission: Impossible).
