= Ecevit Kılıç =

Turkish journalist and writer

Ecevit Kılıç (born 1977) is a Turkish journalist and writer. He was a columnist for Cumhuriyet (1999 - 2006) and later Sabah. He is the author of a number of books on Turkish organised crime (including its involvement in football) and the Turkish deep state (including the Special Warfare Department and JİTEM).

== Books ==
- Kirli Kramponlar: Futbol ve Mafya ("Dirty Cleats: Football and Mafia"), Bilge Karınca Yayınları, 2004
- Konuşan Mafya "Mafya Sözlüğü", Bilge Karınca Yayınları, 2004
- Politik Goller: futbol ve siyaset ("Political Goals"). 2006
- Özel Harp Dairesi: Türkiye'nin Gizli Tarihi, Güncel Yayıncılık, 2008
- Kirli Kramponlar: Futbol ve Mafya ("Dirty Cleats: Football and Mafia"), Timaş Yayınları, 2011
- Jitem: Türkiye'nin Faili Meçhul Tarihi, Timaş Yayınları, 2011
