= Dudu (album) =

EP by Tarkan
- Released: 1 July 2003
- Recorded: Recorded at Sari Ev and Imaj Studios (Istanbul, Turkey)
- Genre: Pop
- Length: 44:29
- Label: HITT Production/İstanbul Plak/Megaliner Records/Астра
- Producer: Tarkan and Ozan Çolakoğlu

Tarkan chronology
Karma (2001)	Dudu (2003)	Come Closer (2006)

Dudu is a 2003 extended play album by Tarkan. This was his first album to be released through his own record label, HITT Music. It holds five songs and five remixes. The sales of the album exceeded 1 million copies worldwide. To support the album, beginning in November 2003 Tarkan gave solo performances in Turkey and other countries. In 2004 as part of Dudu World tour Tarkan visited Austria, Germany, France, United States, Ukraine, Russia, Finland, the Netherlands, Azerbaijan and Kazakhstan.

== Track listing ==
#	Song	Composer	Lyricist	Time
1	Dudu	Tarkan, Jeff Koplan	Nazan Öncel	4:35
2	Bu Şarkılar da Olmasa	Nazan Öncel	Nazan Öncel	4:26
3	Gülümse Kaderine	Tarkan, Ozan Çolakoğlu	Tarkan	3:47
4	Sorma Kalbim	Ozan Çolakoğlu	Tarkan	4:35
5	Uzun İnce Bir Yoldayım	Aşık Veysel	Aşık Veysel	4:57
6	Dudu (Ozan Çolakoğlu Remix)	Tarkan, Jeff Koplan	Nazan Öncel	4:51
7	Gülümse Kaderine (Devrim Remix)	Tarkan, Ozan Çolakoğlu	Tarkan	5:18
8	Bu Şarkılar da Olmasa (Devrim Remix)	Nazan Öncel	Nazan Öncel	5:52
9	Dudu (Özgür Buldum Remix)	Tarkan, Jeff Koplan	Nazan Öncel	3:54
10	Gülümse Kaderine (Murat Matthew Erdem Remix)	Tarkan, Ozan Çolakoğlu	Tarkan	4:54

- Uzun İnce Bir Yoldayım (Remix)

== Album credits ==
- Personnel Crew:
  - Production: Hitt Music
  - Produced by: Tarkan
  - Distributor: Istanbul Plak Ltd.
  - Producer: Tarkan & Ozan Çolakoğlu
  - Mix: Murat Matthew Erdem
  - Mastering: Tim Young, Metropolist Studios London
  - Recorded at: Sari Ev (Kayit ve Mix), Imaj, ASM (Uzun Ince Bir Yoldayim Mix)
  - Executive Producer: Egemen Öncel
  - Photos: Hasan Hüseyin
  - Hair Design: Mete Türkmen
  - Make-up Artist: Neriman Eröz
  - Costume Coordinator: Gülümser Gürtunca

== Guest musicians ==
- Instruments:
  - Classical Guitar - Erdem Sökmen, Ayhan Gunyil
  - Electric, Bass (Guitar) - Nurkan Renda
  - Oud - Ilyas Tetik
  - Strings - Gündem Yayli Grubu (String Band)
  - String Arrangements (Track 2) - Hamit Undas
- For Track 5:
  - Background vocals, Baglama (Lead, Bass) - Arif Sağ
  - Baglama (Arpeggio), Selpe - Erdal Erzincan
  - Balaban - Ertan Tekin
  - Percussion - Mehmet Akatay, Cengiz Ercumer, Arif Sağ

== Music videos ==
- Dudu
- Gülümse Kaderine
- Sorma Kalbim
- Uzun İnce Bir Yoldayım (Ozinga Mix) (The music video was filmed to a remixed version that does not appear on the album.)

== Extra information ==
Tarkan's 2003 musical offering was his first album to be released under his own label HITT Music and the first Tarkan album to be packaged in a Digipak. Technically it could be classed as an EP release with only five edits and five remixes, but it is generally viewed as an album as its track length is over 35 minutes. Dudu was the first hybrid album of its kind in Turkey to sell over 1,000,000 copies. Tarkan once again collaborated with singer-songwriter Nazan Öncel for this album after a successful collaboration on his Karma album. - courtesy of Ali Yildirim

"Uzun İnce Bir Yoldayım (remix)" - '5:47'
