= HITT Production =

HITT Müzik & Prodüksiyon
- Company type: Private
- Industry: Music & Entertainment
- Founded: 1997
- Headquarters: Istanbul, Turkey
- Key people: Tarkan Tevetoğlu (Founder)
- Products: Music & Entertainment
- Website: hitt.com.tr

HITT Production or HITT Müzik & Prodüksiyon is a Turkish record label and production company established by pop singer Tarkan in 1997, in Levent, Beşiktaş, Istanbul.

Besides being Tarkan's record label producing his Turkish album Dudu, it also produced Nazan Öncel's Yan Yana Fotoğraf Çektirelim. The company also functions as a production company, organising video shootings, advertisement filming and concerts. Apart from Tarkan's concerts it arranged the 2007 Harbiye Açıkhava Tiyatrosu (Harbiye Open-Air Theatre) concert series, where such celebrities took stage like Ajda Pekkan, Sibel Can, İbrahim Tatlıses, Levent Yüksel, Özcan Deniz, Serdar Ortaç, Ebru Gündeş, the rock band Duman or world-famous Latin guitarist José Feliciano. As part of the event, renowned Turkish rock stars, including Demir Demirkan, Pamela Spence and Hayko Cepkin performed rock musicals.

== Artists ==
- Tarkan
- Nazan Öncel
- Emir
