= Murat Boz discography =

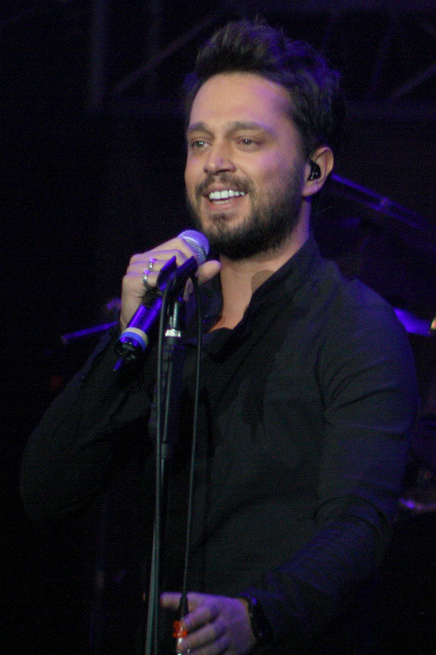
- Murat Boz, October 2011
- Studio albums: 4
- Extended plays: 1
- Compilation albums: 1
- Singles: 8
- B-sides: 2
- Music videos: 33

Turkish pop singer Murat Boz's discography consists of four studio albums, one compilation album, one EP, eight singles and four duet single. Boz was born in Zonguldak and started his music career in 2001. He worked as a backing vocalist for Tarkan for 5 years. In 2006, he made his debut by releasing the single "Aşkı Bulamam Ben". In 2007, his first studio album, Maximum, was released. The album's lead single topped Turkey's official music charts. This was the first time that his name appeared on music charts inside Turkey. The following year, he released his first EP, titled Uçurum. His second studio album, Şans, was released in 2009. The songs "Para Yok", "Özledim", "Her Şeyi Yak", "Sallana Sallana", "Gümbür Gümbür" and "Buralardan Giderim" from this album were turned into music videos, and Soner Sarıkabadayı appeared in the video for "İki Medeni İnsan". Boz released his second single, "Hayat Sana Güzel", in March 2010. On 12 April 2011, a music video for the lead single from the album Aşklarım Büyük Benden was released. On 9 May 2011, the album itself was released. The songs "Hayat Öpücüğü", "Geri Dönüş Olsa", "Kalamam Arkadaş", "Bulmaca" and "Soyadımsın" from this album were the pieces for which separate music videos were released. Out of these songs, "Geri Dönüş Olsa" and "Kalamam Arkadaş" topped the official music charts inside Turkey. In August 2012, Boz released his first remix album under the title Dance Mix.

== Albums ==
=== Studio albums ===
List of albums and sales figures
Album	Album information	Sales
Maximum	Released: 9 February 2007; Label: Stardium; Format: CD, digital download	—N/a
Şans	Released: 25 February 2009; Label: DSM; Format: CD · digital download	Turkey: 17,000^{[A]}
Aşklarım Büyük Benden	Released: 9 May 2011; Label: DSM; Format: CD · digital download	Turkey: 35,000^{[B]}
Janti	Released: 8 April 2016; Label: DMC; Format: CD · digital download	Turkey: 50,000
3	Released: 7 March 2024; Label: Boz Production; Format: digital download	Turkey:

=== Compilations ===
Album	Album information	Details	Sales
Dance Mix	Released: 14 August 2012; Label: DSM; Format: CD, digital download	Dance Mix is Murat Boz's first remix album. It consists of 9 remix songs. "Özledim (Gurcell Club Mix)" and "Geri Dönüş Olsa (Erdem Kınay Remix)" were the songs from this remix album that were made into music videos.	—N/a

=== EPs ===
Album	Album information	Details	Sales
Uçurum	Released: 22 July 2008; Label: DSM; Format: CD, digital download	Uçurum, Murat Boz'un first EP album. It consists of 3 songs 5 remixes. "Uçurum" was the only song from this EP that was turned into a music video.	—N/a

== Singles ==
Single	Single information	Details	Sales
"Aşkı Bulamam Ben"	Released: 16 July 2006; Label: Stardium; Format: CD	"Aşkı Bulamam Ben" is Murat Boz's first song. It was written and composed by Nil Karaibrahimgil.	—N/a
"Hayat Sana Güzel"	Released: 10 April 2010; Label: DSM; Format: CD, digital download	"Hayat Sana Güzel" is Murat Boz's second single. Another version of the song was used in a commercial in which Boz himself appeared.	Digital: 29,596+^{[C]}
"Aşklarım Büyük Benden"	Released: 12 April 2011; Label: DSM; Format: Digital download	"Aşklarım Büyük Benden" is Murat Boz's third single. It is also the lead single of his album which bears the same title.	—N/a
"Vazgeçmem"	Released: 12 April 2013; Label: DMC; Format: CD, digital download	"Vazgeçmem" is Murat Boz's fourth single. He performed it for the first time at Turkey Music Awards.	—N/a
"Geç Olmadan"	Released: 7 May 2018; Label: DMC; Format: Digital download	"Geç Olmadan" is Murat Boz's fifth single. The song was performed by Boz for Cornetto's 2018 commercials.	—N/a
"Aşk Bu"	Released: 19 July 2019; Label: DMC; Format: Digital download	"Aşk Bu" is Murat Boz's sixth single.	—N/a
"Can Kenarım"	Released: 14 February 2020; Label: DMC; Format: Digital download	"Can Kenarım" is Murat Boz's seventh single.	—N/a
"Kalben"	Released: 10 June 2020; Label: DMC; Format: Digital download	"Kalben" is Murat Boz's eighth single.	—N/a
"Gece"	Released: 10 August 2020; Label: DMC; Format: Digital download	"Gece" is Murat Boz's ninth single.	—N/a
"Sevgilim"	Released: 19 February 2021; Label: DMC; Format: Digital download	"Sevgilim" is Murat Boz's tenth single.	—N/a
"Harbi Güzel"	Released: 7 March 2022; Label: Boz Production · DMC; Format: Digital download	"Harbi Güzel" is Murat Boz's eleventh single.	—N/a
"Derin Mevzular"	Released: 23 June 2023; Label: Boz Production · DMC; Format: Digital download	"Derin Mevzular" is Murat Boz's twelfth single. It was released as a promotional single from his upcoming album 3.	—N/a
"Gözdeki Maviye"	Released: 11 August 2023; Label: Boz Production · DMC; Format: Digital download	"Gözdeki Maviye" is Murat Boz's thirteenth single. It was released as a promotional single from his upcoming album 3.	—N/a
"Aşkın Darağacı"	Released: 7 November 2023; Label: Boz Production · DMC; Format: Digital download	"Aşkın Darağacı" is Murat Boz's fourteenth single. It was released as a promotional single from his upcoming album 3.	—N/a
"Gülistan"	Released: 30 April 2026; Label: Boz Production; Format: Digital download	"Gülistan" is Murat Boz's fifteenth single.	—N/a
"Yara Tuz"	Released: 11 June 2026; Label: Boz Production; Format: Digital download	"Yara Tuz" is Murat Boz's sixteenth single.	—N/a

=== Duet singles ===
Single	Single information	Details	Sales
"İki Medeni İnsan"	Released: 11 February 2010; Label: DSM; Format: Digital download	"İki Medeni İnsan" is Murat Boz's first duet single. Boz performed the song together with Soner Sarıkabadayı. The song was released as a single on digital platforms.	Digital: 40,367+^{[D]}
"Olmuyor"	Released: 20 February 2013; Label: Avrupa Müzik; Format: Digital download	"Olmuyor" is Murat Boz's second duet single. Boz performed the song together with Oğuz Berkay Fidan. The song was released as a single on digital platforms.	Digital:
"İltimas"	Released: 18 March 2014; Label: DMC; Format: Digital download	"İltimas" is Murat Boz's third duet single. Boz performed the song together with Gülşen. The song was released as a single on digital platforms.	Digital:
"Leylim Ley"	Released: 24 May 2019; Label: EMI; Format: Digital download	"Leylim Ley" is Murat Boz's fourth duet single. Boz performed the song together with Ferat Üngür. The song was released as a single on digital platforms.	Digital:
"Sonsuza Dek"	Released: 11 February 2022; Label: Blue Music; Format: Digital download	"Sonsuza Dek" is Murat Boz's fifth duet single. Boz performed the song together with Ebru Gündeş. The song was released as a single on digital platforms.	Digital:
"Çıktın Oyundan"	Released: 6 October 2023; Label: Hypers Music; Format: Digital download	"Çıktın Oyundan" is Murat Boz's sixth duet single. Boz performed the song together with Çağrı Telkıvıran. The song was released as a single on digital platforms.	Digital:
"Üzüleceksin 2.0"	Released: 18 April 2025; Label: ZUNA; Format: Digital download	"Üzüleceksin 2.0" is Murat Boz's seventh duet single. Boz performed the song together with Snow and Era7capone. The song was released as a single on digital platforms.	Digital:
"Yapar Mısın?"	Released: 25 July 2025; Label: ZUNA; Format: Digital download	"Yapar Mısın?" is Murat Boz's eighth duet single. Boz performed the song together with Poizi. The song was released as a single on digital platforms.	Digital:
"Kolay Değil"	Released: 10 April 2026; Label: Boz Production; Format: Digital download	"Kolay Değil" is Murat Boz's ninth duet single. Boz performed the song together with Melek Mosso. The song was released as a single on digital platforms.	Digital:

== Other works ==
Song	Song information	Details	Sales
"Yalan"	Released: 1 April 2005; Label: Stardium; Format: CD, digital download	"Yalan" is a song from Grup Hepsi's first album Bir. Murat Boz performs a part of the song together with the group.	—N/a
"Yazmışsa Bozmak Olmaz"	Released: 17 August 2011; Label: DMC; Format: CD, digital download	"Yazmışsa Bozmak Olmaz" is a song from arranger Ozan Doğulu's second album. It was performed by Murat Boz. The song was originally performed by Doğulu's brother, Kenan Doğulu.	—N/a
"İlk Anda"	Released: 31 October 2013; Label: KNY; Format: CD, digital download	"İlk Anda" is a song from arranger Erdem Kınay's second album. It was performed by Murat Boz.	—N/a
"Hey"	Released: 21 June 2017; Label: DMC; Format: CD, digital download	"Hey" is a song from arranger Ozan Doğulu's album 130 BPM Forte. It was performed by Murat Boz.	—N/a

== Charts ==
Position of songs on different lists, year of publication and albums's names
Song	Year	Peak (TR)	Album
"Aşkı Bulamam Ben"	2006	—	Aşkı Bulamam Ben
"Maximum"	2007	3	Maximum
"Püf"	2007	—	Maximum
"Uçurum"	2008	5	Uçurum
"Ben Aslında"	2008	16	Uçurum
"Para Yok"	2009	5	Şans
"Özledim"	2009	3	Şans
"Her Şeyi Yak"	2009	10	Şans
"Sallana Sallana"	2009	4	Şans
"Gümbür Gümbür"	2009	—	Şans
"İki Medeni İnsan" (feat. Soner Sarıkabadayı)	2010	2	Şans
"Buralardan Giderim"	2010	7	Şans
"Hayat Sana Güzel"	2010	—	Hayat Sana Güzel
"Aşklarım Büyük Benden"	2011	—	Aşklarım Büyük Benden
"Hayat Öpücüğü"	2011	—	Aşklarım Büyük Benden
"Geri Dönüş Olsa"	2011	1	Aşklarım Büyük Benden
"Kalamam Arkadaş"	2011	1	Aşklarım Büyük Benden
"Bulmaca"	2012	—	Aşklarım Büyük Benden
"Soyadımsın"	2012	—	Aşklarım Büyük Benden
"Vazgeçmem"	2013	—	Vazgeçmem
"İltimas" (with Gülşen)	2014	1	İltimas
"Janti"	2016	1	Janti
"Adını Bilen Yazsın"	2016	2	Janti
"Yana Döne"	2017	—	Janti
"Geç Olmadan"	2018	9	Geç Olmadan
"Can Kenarım"	2020	2	Can Kenarım
"Kalben"	2020	3	Kalben
"Gece"	2020	9	Gece
"—" indicates that the songs were not included in the lists or the results were not disclosed.

== Music videos ==
Song	Year	Singer(s)	Director(s)	Notes
"Aşkı Bulamam Ben"	2006	Murat Boz	Süleyman Yüksel	
"Maximum"	2007	Murat Boz	Murad Küçük	
"Püf"	2007	Murat Boz	Murad Küçük	
"Uçurum"	2008	Murat Boz	Tülay İbak	
"Para Yok"	2009	Murat Boz	Murat Onbul	
"Özledim"	2009	Murat Boz	Murad Küçük	
"Her Şeyi Yak"	2009	Murat Boz	Emir Khalilzadeh	
"Sallana Sallana"	2009	Murat Boz	—N/a	
"Gümbür Gümbür"	2009	Murat Boz	Gürcan Keltek	The music video was shot on Istanbul's Maslak, Galata, Tünel and Balat neighborhoods.
"İki Medeni İnsan"	2010	Murat Boz and Soner Sarıkabadayı	Gürcan Keltek	The clip was shot in London. It shows Boz and Sarıkabadayı at a construction site and features black-and-white shots.
"Hayat Sana Güzel"	2010	Murat Boz	Murad Küçük	
"Buralardan Giderim"	2010	Murat Boz	Burak Ertaş	
"Aşklarım Büyük Benden"	2011	Murat Boz	Burak Ertaş	South African model Sonja Wronski appears in the music video.
"Hayat Öpücüğü"	2011	Murat Boz	Murad Küçük	The clip evolves around a great love story which ends as a result of a traffic accident.
"Geri Dönüş Olsa"	2011	Murat Boz	Tülay İbak	
"Kalamam Arkadaş"	2011	Murat Boz	Korhan Bozkurt	
"Bulmaca"	2012	Murat Boz	Burak Ertaş	
"Soyadımsın"	2012	Murat Boz	Burak Ertaş	Two people selected from the applications made within the scope of a brand's campaign, appeared alongside Boz in the video. Filming took place at Sirkeci railway station.
"Özledim (Gurcell Club Mix)"	2012	Murat Boz	Nihat Odabaşı	
"Geri Dönüş Olsa (Erdem Kınay Remix)"	2012	Murat Boz	Nihat Odabaşı	
"Vazgeçmem"	2013	Murat Boz	Nihat Odabaşı	
"İltimas"	2014	Murat Boz and Gülşen	Emre Ünal and Ali Ata Akel	
"Elmanın Yarısı (Hadi İnşallah Film Music)"	2014	Murat Boz	—N/a	
"Janti"	2016	Murat Boz	Bedran Güzel	
"Adını Bilen Yazsın"	2016	Murat Boz	Murad Küçük	
"Gün Ağardı"	2016	Murat Boz and Ebru Gündeş	Gülşen Aybaba	
"Yana Döne"	2017	Murat Boz	Gülşen Aybaba	
"Hey"	2018	Murat Boz	Murad Küçük	
"Geç Olmadan"	2018	Murat Boz	Serdar Dönmez	
"Öldür Beni Sevgilim (Original Film Music)"	2019	Murat Boz	Şenol Sönmez	
"Aşk Bu"	2019	Murat Boz	Elif Demiralp	
"Can Kenarım"	2020	Murat Boz	Gülşen Aybaba	
"Kalben"	2020	Murat Boz	Gülşen Aybaba	
"Gece"	2020	Murat Boz	Elif Kalkan	
"Sevgilim"	2021	Murat Boz	Murad Küçük	
"Sonsuza Dek"	2022	Murat Boz and Ebru Gündeş	Gülşen Aybaba	
"Harbi Güzel"	2022	Murat Boz	Bedran Güzel	
"Harbi Güzel (Emrah Karaduman Remix)"	2022	Murat Boz	Mikail Yılmaz	
"Derin Mevzular"	2023	Murat Boz	Ecem Lawton	
"Gözdeki Maviye"	2023	Murat Boz	Mali Ergin	
"Çıktın Oyundan"	2023	Murat Boz and Çağrı Telkıvıran	Mali Ergin	
"Aşkın Darağacı"	2023	Murat Boz	Murad Küçük	
"Çok Sevdik"	2024	Murat Boz	Ecem Lawton	
"Yapar Mısın?"	2025	Murat Boz and Poizi	Cenan Çelik	
"Kolay Değil"	2026	Murat Boz and Melek Mosso	Murat Joker	

=== Guest appearances ===
Song	Year	Singer(s)	Director(s)	Notes
"Bronzlaşmak"	2004	Nil Karaibrahimgil	—N/a	Murat Boz polishes Karaibrahimgil's nails and plays guitar in the video.
"Start the Fire"	2006	Tarkan	Kıvanç Baruönü	Murat Boz made a guest appearance in "Start the Fire" music video.
"Amazon"	2006	Ajda Pekkan	Ayşe Ersayın	Murat Boz made a guest appearance in "Amazon" music video.
"Kasaba"	2008	Murat Dalkılıç	Erkan Naz	Murat Boz was featured in "Kasaba" music video alongside Dalkılıç.

== Notes ==
- A Şans sales figures in Turkey as of 1 July 2009.
- B Aşklarım Büyük Benden sales figures in Turkey as of 31 December 2011.
