= Hepsi discography =

- Studio albums: 4
- Singles: 15
- B-sides: 1
- Music videos: 15

This is the discography of Turkish pop group Hepsi, who has released four studio albums and one single on "Stardium Labels".

Hepsi gained fame with their debut album, Bir, and its single "Olmaz Oğlan". The album later produced three more singles: the more successful "Yalan", and Herşeye Rağmen" and "Üç Kalp".

The group then released their first official single, "Tempo".

Then the group released their second studio album, Hepsi 2, also a huge success, which produced two singles: "Kalpsizsin" and "Aşk Sakızı".

They released their third studio album Şaka (10+1) in May 2008 and have released one single from the album, "4 Peynirli Pizza".

== Albums ==
Year	Album
2005	Bir: 1st studio album; Released: 2005; Formats: CD
2006	Hepsi 2: 2nd studio album; Released: 2006; Formats: CD
2008	Şaka (10+1): 3rd studio album; Released: May 24, 2008; Formats: CD
2010	Geri Dönüşüm: 4th studio album; Released: March 9, 2010; Formats: CD

== Charts ==
Year	Single	Album	Turkish Singles Chart
2005	Olmaz Oğlan	Bir	5
2005	Yalan ft Murat Boz	Bir	1
2005	Herşeye Rağmen	Bir	8
2005	Üç Kalp	Bir	10
2006	Tempo ft Sezen Aksu	Tempo (Single/Pepsi Özel)	16
2006	Kalpsizsin	Hepsi 2	7
2007	Aşk Sakızı	Hepsi 2	2
2008	Sen Bir Tanesin	Winx Club Kayıp Krallığın Sırrı	3
2008	4 Peynirli Pizza	Şaka (10+1)	18
2009	Hep Bana	Şaka (10+1)	26
2010	Yeter	Geri Dönüşüm	20
2010	Canıma değsin	Geri Dönüşüm	89
2010	Harikalar Diyarı	Winx Club 3D / Sihirli Macera Soundtrack	18
2010	Nükleer	Geri Dönüşüm	73
2010	Uğraşma	Geri Dönüşüm	51

== B-sides ==
Year	Song	A-side
2006	"Kaç Yıl Geçti Aradan"	"Tempo"

== Music videos ==
Year	Song	Album	Director
2005	"Olmaz Oğlan"	Bir	
2005	"Yalan"	Bir	Selatin Kara
2005	"Herşeye Rağmen"	Bir	
2005	"Üç Kalp"	Bir	
2006	"Tempo"	Tempo single	
2006	"Kalpsizsin"	Hepsi 2	
2007	"Aşk Sakızı"	Hepsi 2	
2008	"Sen Bir Tanesin"	"Winx Club Kayıp Krallığın Sırrı (Soundtrack)"	Süleyman Yüksel
2008	"4 Peynirli Pizza"	"Saka (10+1)"	Seda Çalışır
2009	"Hep Bana"	"Saka (10+1)"	
