= Gülçin Ergül =

Turkish singer (born 1985)

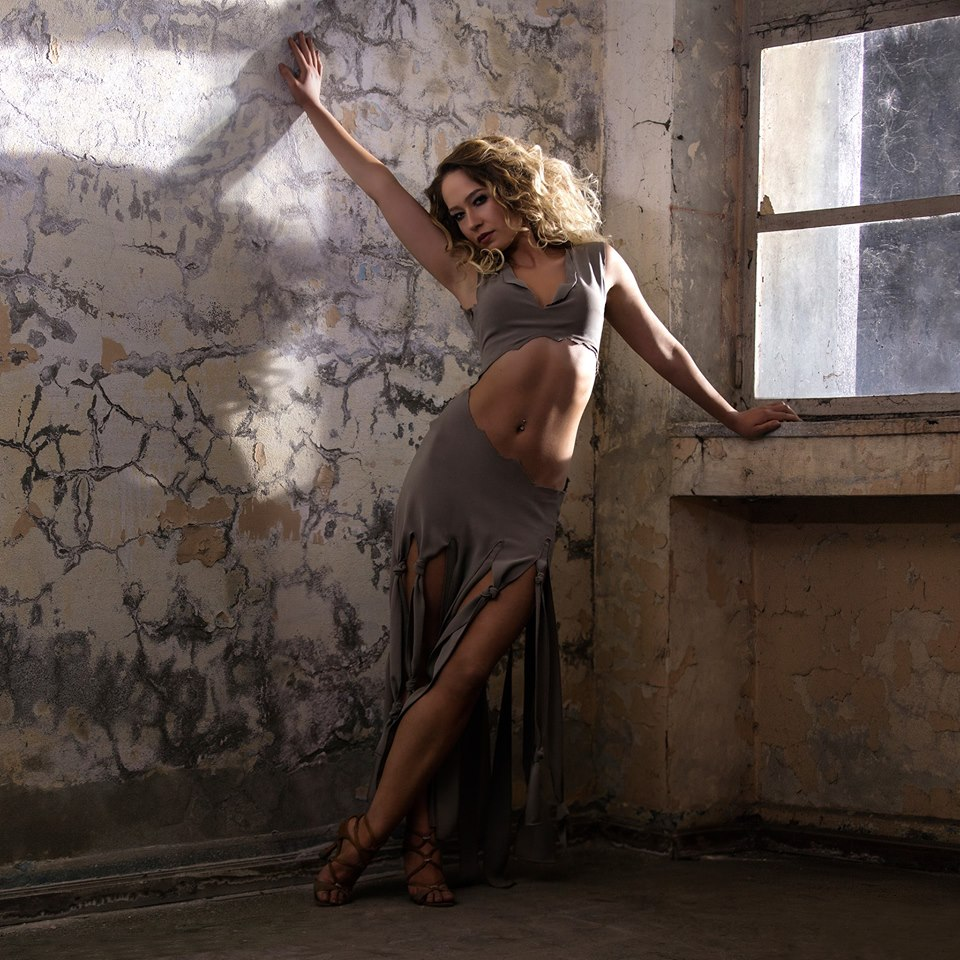
- Ergül in 2016

Background information
- Born: 30 October 1985 (age 40); Istanbul, Turkey
- Genres: Pop; R&B; funk; soul; blues; dance
- Occupations: Singer; songwriter; actress; composer; dancer; choreographer
- Instruments: Vocals; piano
- Years active: 2004–present
- Labels: Stardium (2005–2010); Avrupa Müzik (2010–2014); Arpej Yapım (2015–2021); Roka Music (2021–present)
- Formerly of: Hepsi
- Website: gulcinergul.com.tr

Gülçin Ergül (born 30 October 1985) is a Turkish singer, songwriter, composer, dancer, choreographer, actress, and yin yoga teacher.

== Life and career ==
=== 1985–2004: Early years and education ===
Ergül started her music career by studying piano at Pera Fine Arts Academy. She was then selected to join the Atatürk Cultural Centre State Opera and Children's Ballet Ensemble as well as the Children's Choir. She began to pick up roles and perform as a child actress in theatre. She played in adaptations of Bird Man and the Prince, Cinderella, Sleeping Beauty and The King and I. She completed her high school education at Mimar Sinan Fine Arts University State Conservatory Ballet Department. She graduated with an undergraduate degree from Mimar Sinan Fine Arts University State Conservatory Modern Dance Education. She then continued to work on different dance routines with choreographers from all over the world. Ergül also took private singing lessons during her high school years.

=== 2005–2009: Group Hepsi, Pepsi, Penti, Hepsi 1 ===
In 2005, she established a girl-band named Hepsi with Cemre Kemer, Yasemin Yürük, and Eren Bakıcı. Ergül was the lead vocalist. Kemer's mother, Şebnem Özberk, managed the group. When they were nine years old, they were students at the same conservatory and Özberk began to build the group. They released three albums, one EP and three soundtracks: Hepsi 1, Hepsi 2, Şaka (10+1), Tempo (Hepsi for Pepsi), Winx Club Turkish SoundTracks and "Jenerik Hepsi 1". In 2006, the band became the faces of commercial brands Pepsi and Penti. She won more than 10 awards with Hepsi in Turkey. The band toured Turkey and abroad with Sezen Aksu and Kenan Doğulu in 2006 and 2007, respectively. They toured Turkey 7 times and abroad 2 times. She also guest starred with Hepsi in different TV series and movies. Hepsi then had a TV show in 2007 called Hepsi 1 which was aired by Turkish TV channels Show TV and ATV. She played the character "Gülçin" for two seasons. Together with the group, they released their own stationery and school supplies line, consisting of books, pens, pencils, art books, and diaries. Ergül then left the band in 2009.

=== 2011–2015: Solo career and Bravo!, Bir Tanecik Aşkım ===
Two years later in 2011, Ergül released her first solo EP album titled Bravo!. She recorded her first music video for the song "Ara Ara" which was number one in Billboard Türkiye. She then worked with the dancer and choreographer "David Hernandes" for "Ara Ara", who also has worked with the likes of Kylie Minogue and Mariah Carey. She then started to perform jingles for Star TV, Medipol University, Show TV, Tamek, Radio Fenomen and Radio Bilyoner.

She became the cover girl of Marie Claire, Trendy, WoMen, Salsa, Hey Girl, and Zoom magazines.

In 2015, she released her second solo EP album titled Bir Tanecik Aşkım. The music video for "Bir Tanecik Aşkım" garnered 41 million views on YouTube. She recorded an English version of the song called "My One and Only Love".

=== 2016–2020: Arabesk, Avon, All Together Now, and Ağlat Beni ===
In 2016, she released another single called "Harabeyim", which the lyrics and music belong to her. In the same year Ergül also covered in a duet called "Ağlat Beni" with the Turkish singer Harun Kolçak. The song quickly became a hit in Turkey where the audio version reached 48 million streams and the music video reached 36 million views on YouTube. She toured Turkey with Harun Kolçak.

Ergül became the face of Avon in 2018 and released a song for the brand. In August 2018, she released her conceptual project album, Arabesk. In the album, she reinterpreted old Arabesque songs using modern vocals. She has filmed music videos for the songs "İtirazım Var" and "İkimize Birden", which were featured in the album.

In 2019, she made a soundtrack for the movie Kim Daha Mutlu, which also has the same name. In the same year she released another single called "Hoş Geldin" which was also featured in the movie. Ergül became one of the main judges for Benimle Söyle, the Turkish version of All Together Now, for two seasons.

In 2020, she created a soul-trap single called "Ferman", whose lyrics and music belong to her. Due to the COVID-19 pandemic, the production process was completed indoors, in her own home. She also filmed the music video for the song at home.

=== 2020–present: Davet, ALFA Awards, Invitation ===
Ergül released her fourth studio album, Davet, on her birthday, 30 October 2020, from Arpej Production. In the album, which Emre Bayar was the music director, many different styles such as pop, trap, disco, R&B, and soul were combined. In addition to the new song titled "Sana Aşığım" by Yıldız Tilbe and the collaboration with Anıl Piyancı in the song "Kalbime Sorsam", there are also 9 songs by Gülçin Ergül. The intro of the album and the song named "Davet", which is named after the album, express the mission of the album. The first music video for the album, "Beni Bu Rüyadan Uyandırma", was completed in 15 hours and was directed by Murat Joker. The singer, who danced in Vogue and High Heels style, was accompanied by four dancers. In the first 24 hours that the album was released, it was number one on the most purchased list in iTunes Turkey. She became the cover girl of the November 2020 issue of She & Girls magazine. During the launch period of the album, she was a guest as "Gülçin Ergül" in the 86th episode of Yasak Elma, a series on Fox, and sang the song "Sana Aşığım" from her latest album Davet. After the episode aired, "Sana Aşığım" was number 1 on the list of Shazam Turkey Top 50 and the Spotify list of TV Soundtracks.

By the end of 2020, which was heavily affected by the COVID-19 epidemic, Ergül released a single titled "Yeni Yılın Kutlu Olsun" (Happy New Year), whose lyrics and music belong to her and Ezgi Ayçe. More than 60,000 videos were made with the song in a short time on the international platform TikTok. She won an award named 2020 ALFA Awards with Kenan Doğulu that was given from Spain.

Ergül released her first English and fifth studio album, Invitation, on 16 April 2021 by Arpej Production. The record contains seven songs by Ergül and two by award-winning songwriter Josephine Zwaan from the Netherlands. In addition, there is a cover version of "I Wanna Dance with Somebody (Who Loves Me)". The first music video for the album, "Don't Wake Me Up", the English version of "Beni Bu Rüyadan Uyandırma", was directed by Murat Joker. In the first 24 hours that the album was released, it was number one in the most purchased list on iTunes Turkey and two songs in the album were number 2, number 3, number 5 and number 20 in the Breaking pop, Future hits, New music daily, New in pop lists in iTunes Turkey and US.

Throughout her music career, she has worked with Turkish musicians such as Sezen Aksu, Yıldız Tilbe, Mete Özgencil, Harun Kolçak, Ozan Doğulu, Kenan Doğulu, İskender Paydaş, Bülent Aris, Süleyman Yüksel, as well as RedOne, Marek Pompetzki, Toni Cottura, Michel Zitron.

== Discography ==
Albums with Hepsi
| Title | Year | |
|---|---|---|
| Hepsi 1 | 2005 | |
| Hepsi 2 | 2006 | |
| Şaka (10+1) | 2008 | |
EPs with Hepsi
| Title | Year | |
| Tempo | 2006 | |
Soundtrack with Hepsi
| Title | Year | Notes |
| Jenerik | 2007 | Soundtrack of series "Hepsi 1" |
| Sen Bir Tanesin | 2008 | Winx Club Turkish Soundtrack |
| Sadece Bir Kız | 2008 | Winx Club Turkish Soundtrack |

Solo albums
| Title | Year | Notes |
|---|---|---|
| Davet | 2020 | |
| Invitation | 2021 | english album |
Solo EPs
| Title | Year | Notes |
| Bravo | 2011 | |
| Bir Tanecik Aşkım | 2015 | |
Non-album singles
| Title | Year | Notes |
| Harabeyim | 2016 | |
| Hayatının Hatası | 2017 | with Tuna Kiremitçi |
| Kim Daha Mutlu? | 2019 | Movie soundtrack |
| Hoş Geldin | 2019 | |
| Ferman | 2020 | |
| Yeni Yılın Kutlu Olsun | 2020 | |
| Birbirimize İyi Gelmiyoruz | 2021 | released with "Acoustic" & "Deep Mix" versions |
| Gökyüzü Çağırdı Aşkı | 2022 | |
| Drama Queen | 2023 | released with "Sped Up", "Slowed Down" & "Instrumental" versions |
| Deli Gibi Sev | 2023 | |
| Bir Başka | 2024 | |
| Uslanmazsın | 2024 | |
| 90'ların Aşkları | 2024 | with Ruh |
| Savaşçı | 2025 | |
Cover albums
| Title | Year | Notes |
| Arabesk | 2018 | |
Cover singles
| Title | Year | Notes |
| Ağlat Beni | 2016 | featuring Harun Kolçak |
| İyisin | 2017 | with What Da Funk? |
| Mecbursun | 2017 | with What Da Funk? |
| Ağlama Değmez Hayat | 2017 | with Sinan Ceceli |
| Yaman Sevda | 2021 | Tribute Album of Çelik |
| Sevdanın Yolları | 2023 | with Metehan Köseoğlu |
| Yekte | 2024 | with Anıl Şallıel |

== Videography ==
| Year | Song | Director | Album | Label | Role |
|---|---|---|---|---|---|
| 2005 | Olmaz Oğlan | Mete Özgencil | Bir | Stardium | with Hepsi |
| 2005 | Yalan | Süleyman Yüksel | Bir | Stardium | with Hepsi |
| 2005 | Üç Kalp | Süleyman Yüksel | Bir | Stardium | with Hepsi |
| 2005 | Her Şeye Rağmen | Süleyman Yüksel | Bir | Stardium | with Hepsi |
| 2006 | Tempo | Süleyman Yüksel | Tempo | Stardium | with Hepsi |
| 2006 | Kalpsizsin | Süleyman Yüksel | Hepsi 2 | Stardium | with Hepsi |
| 2007 | Aşk Sakızı | Murad Küçük | Hepsi 2 | Stardium | with Hepsi |
| 2007 | Sen Bir Tanesin | Süleyman Yüksel | Kayıp Krallığın Sırrı | Stardium | with Hepsi |
| 2008 | 4 Peynirli Pizza | Seda Çalışır | Şaka (10+1) | Stardium | with Hepsi |
| 2008 | Hep Bana | —N/a | Şaka (10+1) | Stardium | with Hepsi |
| 2011 | Ara Ara | Süleyman Yüksel | Bravo | Avrupa Müzik | As Gülçin Ergül |
| 2015 | Bir Tanecik Aşkım | İlkay Kopan | Bir Tanecik Aşkım | Arpej Yapım | As Gülçin Ergül |
| 2016 | My One and Only Love | İlkay Kopan | Bir Tanecik Aşkım | Arpej Yapım | As Gülçin Ergül |
| 2016 | Bir Tanecik Aşkım (Acapella) | İlkay Kopan | Bir Tanecik Aşkım | Arpej Yapım | As Gülçin Ergül |
| 2016 | Harabeyim | İlkay Kopan | Harabeyim | Arpej Yapım | As Gülçin Ergül |
| 2017 | Ağlat Beni | Gökhan Palas | Çeyrek Asır | Arpej Yapım | As Gülçin Ergül |
| 2018 | İtirazım Var | Gökhan Palas | Arabesk | Arpej Yapım | As Gülçin Ergül |
| 2019 | İkimize Birden | Süleyman Yüksel | Arabesk | Arpej Yapım | As Gülçin Ergül |
| 2019 | Hoş Geldin | Gökhan Palas | Hoş Geldin | Arpej Yapım | As Gülçin Ergül |
| 2020 | Ferman | Gökhan Palas | Ferman | Arpej Yapım | As Gülçin Ergül |
| 2020 | Beni Bu Rüyadan Uyandırma | Murat Joker | Davet | Arpej Yapım | As Gülçin Ergül |
| 2021 | Don't Wake Me Up | Murat Joker | Invitation | Arpej Yapım | As Gülçin Ergül |
| 2021 | Birbirimize İyi Gelmiyoruz | Ahmet Can Tekin | Birbirimize İyi Gelmiyoruz | Roka Music | As Gülçin Ergül |
| 2021 | Birbirimize İyi Gelmiyoruz (Acoustic) | Ahmet Can Tekin | Birbirimize İyi Gelmiyoruz (Acoustic) | Roka Music | As Gülçin Ergül |
| 2022 | Gökyüzü Çağırdı Aşkı | Ahmet Can Tekin | Gökyüzü Çağırdı Aşkı | DMC | As Gülçin Ergül |
| 2023 | Drama Queen | Murat Joker | Drama Queen | DMC | As Gülçin Ergül |

== Filmography ==
| Year | Title | Role | Songs and notes |
|---|---|---|---|
| 2005 | Beyaz Show | —N/a | Hanimiş, Mum, Olmaz Oğlan |
| 2006 | Avrupa Yakası | —N/a | —N/a |
| 2006 | Kısık Ateşte 15 Dakika | Didem | —N/a |
| 2007 | Hepsi Bir | Gülçin | Dur Dur, Yalan, Üç Kalp, Olmaz Oğlan, Her Şeye Rağmen |
| 2008 | Hepsi Bir | Gülçin | Dur Dur, Yalan, Üç Kalp, Olmaz Oğlan, Her Şeye Rağmen |
| 2008 | Benim Annem Bir Melek | —N/a | Hep Bana |
| 2008 | Çok Güzel Hareketler Bunlar | —N/a | Hep Bana, Aşk Her Şeyi Affeder mi? |
| 2008 | Bir Yer Var mı Bildiğin? | —N/a | Dört Peynirli Pizza |
| 2008 | İbo Show | —N/a | Onu Alma Beni Al, İyisin, Tavla, Hep Bana, İki Kelime |
| 2009 | Kayıp Çocuklar Cenneti | —N/a | The film, which was directed by Mete Özgencil, was not released. |
| 2011 | Akustikhane | —N/a | Ara Ara, Bravo, Yastıklara Sarılıp Yatar Mıydın?, It's My Life, Soulmate, Granede, Alright |
| 2011 | Disko Kralı | —N/a | Bravo, Ara Ara |
| 2011 | Nerede Ne Var? | —N/a | Yastıklara Sarılıp Yatar Mıydın? |
| 2012 | Kral Haber | —N/a | Ergül made an appearance and talked about her new album. |
| 2013 | İki Laf Edelim | —N/a | Together with Yalın, she discussed her new album. |
| 2013 | Keremcem'le Akustik Söyleşi | —N/a | —N/a |
| 2020 | Benimle Söyle | Judge | Turkish version of All Together Now. She was one of the judges. |
| 2020 | Yasak Elma | Herself | Appeared as herself and performed the song "Sana Aşığım". |

== Awards ==
| Year | Organization | Category |
|---|---|---|
| 2005 | 11th Kral TV Video Music Awards | Best New Pop Group |
| 2006 | 12th Kral TV Video Music Awards | Best Pop Group |
| 2006 | 1st Jetix Children Awards | Best Loved Music Group |
| 2007 | Our Future Music Awards | Best Pop Group |
| 2007 | Powertürk Music Awards | Best Pop Group |
| 2007 | 2nd Jetix Children Awards | Best Loved Music Group |
| 2007 | 13th Kral TV Video Music Awards | Best Pop Group |
| 2007 | 11th Istanbul FM Golden Awards | Best Pop Group |
| 2008 | 1st Aslan Max Awards | Best Loved Music Group |
| 2008 | 3rd Jetix Children Awards | Best Loved Music Group |
| 2008 | 14th Kral TV Video Music Awards | Best Pop Group |
| 2009 | 2nd Aslan Max Awards | Best Loved Music Group |
| 2009 | 13th Istanbul FM Golden Awards | Best Concert Performance (BGM) |
| 2020 | ALFA Awards Spain | Best Female Turkish Artist |
| 2021 | Best of Rumeli Awards | Best Female Artist |
| 2022 | BAU MüzikOnAir Awards | Best Music Video |
| 2022 | IKU Awards | Best Music Video |
