= Murat Boz =

Turkish singer-songwriter and actor (born 1980)

- Murat Boz in October 2012
- Born: 7 March 1980 (age 46); Karadeniz Ereğli, Turkey
- Education: Istanbul Bilgi University; Istanbul Technical University
- Occupations: Singer-songwriter; actor
- Spouse: Eliz Sakuçoğlu (m. 2008; div. 2012)
- Musical career
- Genres: Crunk; R&B
- Instruments: Vocals; drum; violin; ney; piano
- Years active: 2006–present
- Labels: Stardium; DSM; DMC
- Website: muratboz.com

Murat Boz (born 7 March 1980) is a Turkish singer, songwriter and actor.

Boz began his solo career by releasing his first single, "Aşkı Bulamam Ben", in 2006. In the following year his first studio album titled Maximum (2007) was released, which sold numerous copies and earned him multiple awards. He continued his music career by releasing his subsequent albums Şans (2009), Aşklarım Büyük Benden (2011), and Janti (2016). Numerous songs from these albums including "Maximum", "Uçurum", "Para Yok", "Özledim", "Sallana Sallana" and "Adını Bilen Yazsın" were among the top-five hits on Türkçe Top 20, and "Geri Dönüş Olsa", "Kalamam Arkadaş" and "Janti" were the number-one singles on the list. In addition to his singing career, he began acting by starring in the movie Hadi İnşallah (2014), and later continued his acting career by playing leading roles in Kardeşim Benim (2016), Dönerse Senindir (2016) and Öldür Beni Sevgilim (2019).

An avid player of violin, drum and ney, he is also the commercial face for many brands. Boz is also a judge on the program O Ses Türkiye (Turkish version of The Voice) and was the winning judge on its first season. Throughout his career he has won numerous awards, including four Golden Butterfly Awards and two Kral Music Awards.

== Early life ==
Murat Boz was born on 7 March 1980 in Karadeniz Ereğli, Zonguldak Province, Turkey, as the second child of Ayşe Nedret and Cafer Boz. He has an elder brother named Ali.

He also played in ErdemirSpor Young Football Team for 2 years. After finishing his elementary and secondary school, Boz's mother sent him to music classes and competitions and later encouraged him to study fine arts in high school. After passing an entrance exam in 1995, Boz moved to Istanbul and enrolled in Istanbul Anadolu Fine Arts High School and took courses for four years. At that time, he learned piano and violin. In 1998, he became the winner of the "High School Music and Folk Music Competition", organized by Milliyet newspaper. After taking jazz vocal courses at the Istanbul Bilgi University, he began his studies at ITU Turkish Music State Conservatory. At the same time he began to perform as a backing vocalist for Tarkan.

In 2000, Boz started to make money and pursued his musical career at various music halls as a backing vocalist, and first became a vocalist for Emel Müftüoğlu. He continued his career by vocalizing at the concerts or on studio albums for numerous singers including Burcu Güneş, Demet Sağıroğlu, Hepsi, Hande Yener, Nazan Öncel, Nil Karaibrahimgil, Nilüfer and Tarkan. He collaborated with Tarkan more than any of the other artists and vocalized in his songs for six years.

Also, he was backing vocalist of Shakira in a concert. Boz first entered the Turkish music scene in 2004, when he appeared in Nil Karaibrahimgil's music video "Bronzlaşmak". In 2005, he featured in "Yalan", a single from girl group Hepsi's album, Bir.

== Career ==
=== 2006–10: Maximum and Şans ===
After he featured in hit song "Yalan" of Gülçin Ergül's famous girl group Hepsi. It wasn't until July 2006 when Boz released his first single "Aşkı Bulamam Ben", on which he worked with Nil Karaibrahimgil once again. The music video for this single was directed by Süleyman Yüksel. In October 2006, it was announced that the singer had completed his first studio album. In early 2007, his debut album titled Maximum was released by Stardium, and proved to be a great success as well, propelling him even further in the Turkish music scene. Various artists including Tarkan, Ümit Sayın, Ozan Çolakoğlu and Mustafa Ceceli worked on the album. Boz's single "Maximum" earned him his first number one single on the Billboard Turkey chart and the third single "Püf" was ranked by OGAE as the third suitable song to represent Turkey at the Eurovision Song Contest. In 2007, Boz won the "Best New Artist" Award at three different award ceremonies: Golden Butterfly Awards, Istanbul FM Golden Awards and Kral TV Video Music Awards.

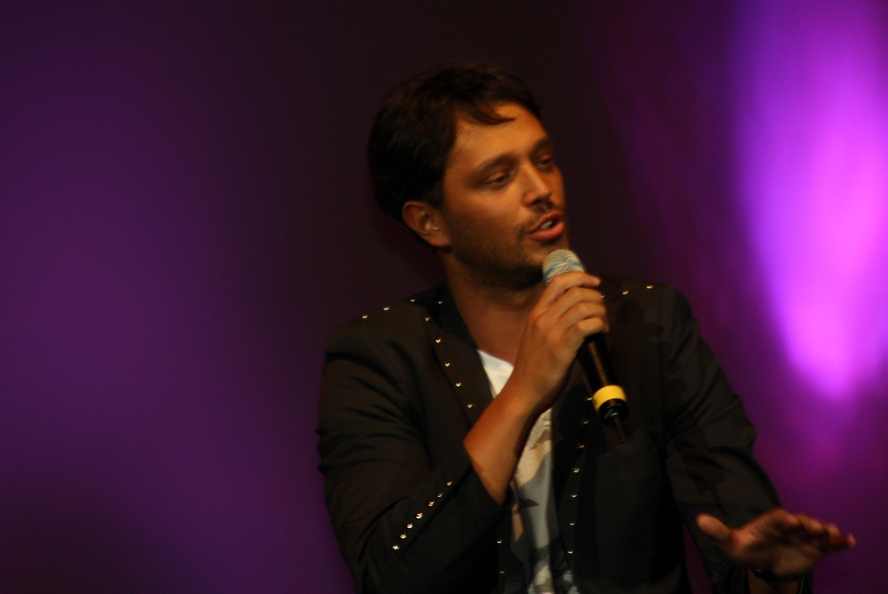
Boz performing in Dortmund, September 2010

In July 2008, Boz's extended play, Uçurum, was released by Dokuz Sekiz Müzik. A single with the same name, written by Soner Sarıkabadayı, peaked at the 5th position on the Turkish Billboard chart.

In the summer of 2008, Boz discussed his intentions on preparing a second studio album. In February 2009, his second studio album, Şans, was released by Dokuz Sekiz Müzik. It sold 17,000 copies and later earned Boz an award from İstanbul FM as the "Best Album by a Male Artist". The single "Para Yok", which was released with a music video ahead of the album's release date, ranked 5th on the Turkish Billboard chart. Following "Para Yok", separate music videos for the songs "Özledim", "Her Şeyi Yak", "Sallana Sallana", "Gümbür Gümbür", "İki Medeni İnsan" and "Buralardan Giderim" were released respectively. "Özledim" and "Sallana Sallana" also peaked at the 5th position on the Turkish Billboard chart. For the music video of "İki Medeni İnsan", a new version was created which featured vocals by the song's writer Soner Sarıkabadayı, and it was later released on digital platforms. The song was nominated at 17th Kral Music Awards in the "Best Duet" category, but lost to Mustafa Ceceli and Elvan Günaydın's single "Eksik".

In April 2010, Boz released the single "Hayat Sana Güzel", written and composed by Soner Sarıkabadayı. The single was used as a promotional song for a campaign with the same name to search for a new vocalist. One of the remixed versions of the song was nominated as the "Best Remixed Song" at the 2011 Kral Music Awards but didn't win.

=== 2011–15: Aşklarım Büyük Benden and Hadi İnşallah ===
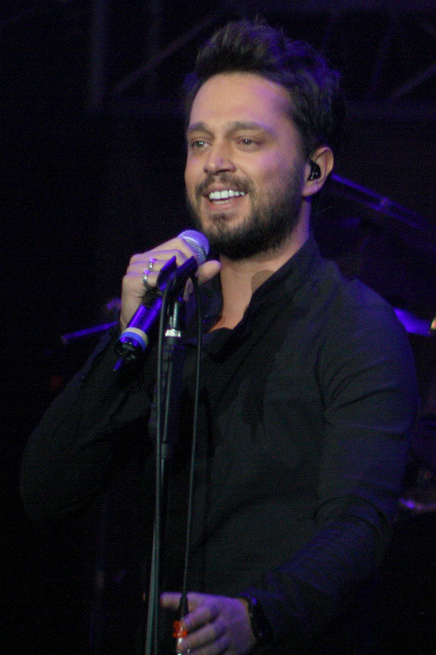
Boz in October 2011

Boz first announced that his third studio album would be released in the summer of 2010. At the end of the same year, he traveled to London to make preparations for the album. In April 2011, a single with the same name as the album was released on digital platforms. It was accompanied by a music video directed by Burak Ertaş. In May 2011, his 3rd studio album Aşklarım Büyük Benden was released. It was distributed by Dokuz Sekiz Müzik. The album sold 35,000 copies and was nominated for the Most Special Album and the Best Album awards by Kadir Has University and Siyaset Dergisi respectively, of which it won the first one. The songs "Hayat Öpücüğü", "Geri Dönüş Olsa", "Kalamam Arkadaş" "Bulmaca", and "Soyadımsın" became popular hit songs, with separate music videos produced for each of them. Of these songs, "Geri Dönüş Olsa" and "Kalamam Arkadaş" topped the Turkish Charts. Finally, at the 39th Golden Butterfly Awards, he won the "Best Turkish Pop Music Male Soloist" award, and also received the "Best Male Artist" award at the Kral Music Awards.

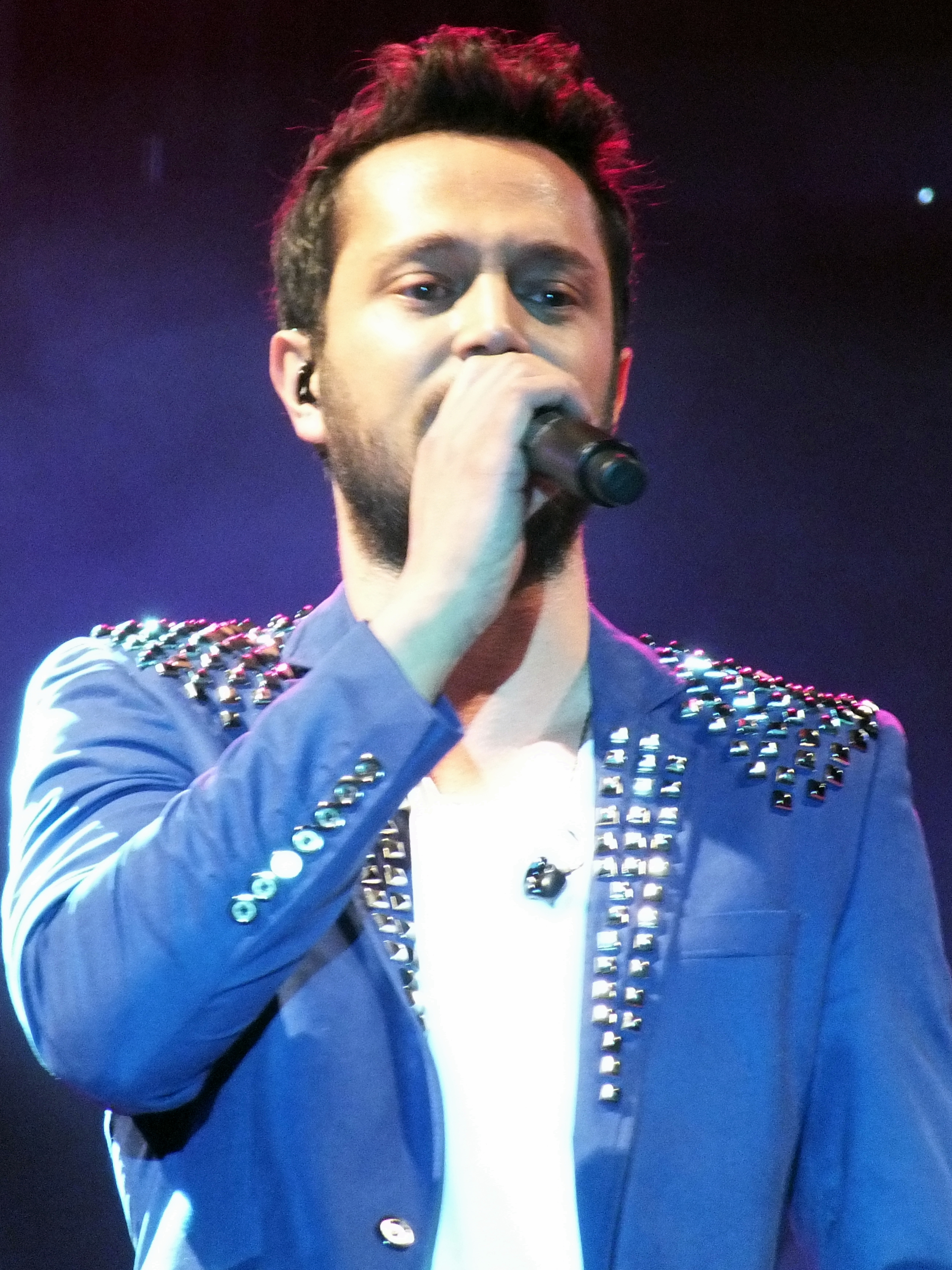
Boz in concert, Silifke, 2012

In August 2012, Murat Boz released his first remix album called Dance Mix. The album contained eight remixes from Boz's second and third albums alongside the remake of "Yazmışsa Bozmak Olmaz", originally a single from Ozan Doğulu's 2011 album 130 Bpm Allegro, which featured vocals by Boz. On the same day as the album's release, Boz divorced his wife Eliz Sakuçoğlu in Hazro, Diyarbakır, whom he had married on 10 October 2008 in Passau, Germany. Two music videos were released for the remixes of "Özledim" and "Geri Dönüş Olsa" and Boz won an award in the category of "Best Remix" for the latter one at the Turkey Music Awards. In February 2013, Oğuz Berkay Fidan released his first single "Olmuyor", featuring Murat Boz, which was a huge success in Turkey. Also at the Turkey Music Awards, he performed for the first time his new single, called "Vazgeçmem", from his forthcoming album. The music video for "Vazgeçmem" was directed by Nihat Odabaşı. In April 2013, "Vazgeçmem" was released as a Digital Single on iTunes and other digital music websites for sale. The song reached the Top 5, peaking at 3 on the Turkish Airplay on radio and first at Turkish Digital Sales. In July 2013, Boz announced that he was working on his new album. In April 2014, the single "İltimas" by Gülşen was released which featured Boz.

=== 2016–present: Kardeşim Benim, Janti and Dönerse Senindir ===
In January 2016, Kardeşim Benim was released in Turkey's cinemas. It was Boz's second acting experience and he shared the leading role with Burak Özçivit and Aslı Enver. In April 2016, his fourth studio album Janti was released by Doğan Music Company. A song with the same name as the album became the number-one hit in Turkey, while a second song titled "Adını Bilen Yazsın" reached number two on the charts. In the following months he played in a movie, titled Dönerse Senindir, alongside İrem Sak and Yasemin Allen. It was released in December 2016.

In 2015, Boz became close to his Kardeşim Benim costar, Aslı Enver, with whom he started a relationship in 2016. The couple broke up in May 2017. After a few months of reconciliation, they eventually ended their relationship in April 2018. In November 2018, they announced their reconciliation after 8 months of separation. However, they broke up again in October 2019.

In January 2017, Boz declared that he would vote "yes" on the Turkish constitutional referendum. Later that year, Boz was among the artists who were featured on Ozan Doğulu's album 130 BPM Forte and performed the song "Hey". A music video for this song was later released in February 2018. In the same year, Boz became the face of Cornetto's 2018 commercials in Turkey, and released the single "Geç Olmadan" in May 2018 as the annual song for the company.

In 2019, Boz starred in the comedy romantic movie Öldür Beni Sevgilim, opposite Seda Bakan. The movie, which was released on 1 March 2019, was not commercially successful, and garnered ₺9.7 million, becoming the tenth most watched movie of 2019 in Turkey as of June 2019. A music video for the main song from the movie's soundtrack was released in February 2019. In July 2019, Boz's sixth single, "Aşk Bu", was released by DMC. The song, which was written by Fikri Karayel and arranged by Ozan Çolakoğlu, was released together with a music video that was recorded in Şile. Mayk Şişman from Milliyet described the single in his review as "one of the most remarkable songs of the year, especially with its post-chorus melody."

On 14 February 2020, Boz's new single "Can Kenarım" was released by DMC. Bilal Sonses wrote the song's lyrics while Mustafa Ceceli served as its arranger. Its music video was directed by Gülşen Aybaba.

== Artistry ==
An instrumentalist who plays piano, violin and ney, Boz is a pop music singer. He believes that only singing a song while performing live on stage is not enough and admires the quality that American singer Madonna has shown in her shows and aims to gain the same level of quality in performance as her. His appearance and style in his first songs were compared to that of Tarkan. Boz, who had been a backing vocalist for Tarkan early in his career, expressed his discomfort with the comparisons between Tarkan and himself. He gained prominence with his dance songs in Maximum and Şans, and later included low tempo songs in his third album Aşklarım Büyük Benden. As he desired to have more mature songs in his third album, he made songs that he thought would have more spiritual sense in them. The album received positive reviews from the critics who said that Boz was in a "good orientation" as he was writing his songs with a theme "close to maturity".

== Other ventures ==
Alongside working on his albums and singles, Boz has participated and taken part in various other projects. He has been a judge on reality singing competition O Ses Türkiye for seven seasons. In season one, four contestants from his group entered the final rounds, and Oğuz Berkay Fidan, one of the remaining eight competitors, won the competition with the majority of votes, making Boz the winning judge of the show's first season. Ceren Şehirlioğlu of Hürriyet praised Boz's role as a judge and described him as "very conscientious, compassionate. On the other hand, his high energy brings a lot of attention from time to time. With his occasional high school-like behavior and jokes, he's one of the most friendly persons among the judges." At the end of 2011, to help the victims of Van earthquake, Boz organized a series of pop concerts in Van in December 2011 to raise money. In 2012, he took part in a program organized by Greenpeace for protecting the North Pole, and aided the company by appearing in its advertising film and sang in Turkish. He has also appeared in numerous commercials for various companies. In 2012, he took part in an advertisement, and following the results of a contest held within a group of selected people, he chose the winners to appear alongside him in the music video for "Soyadımsın".

== Discography ==
=== Studio albums ===
- Maximum (2007)
- Şans (2009)
- Aşklarım Büyük Benden (2011)
- Janti (2016)
- 3 (2024)

=== Compilations ===
- Dance Mix (2012)

== Filmography ==
=== Film ===
Year	Title	Role	Notes
2014	Hadi İnşallah	Pekmez	Leading role
2016	Kardeşim Benim	Ozan	Leading role
2016	Dönerse Senindir	Mehmet	Leading role
2017	Kardeşim Benim 2	Ozan	Leading role
2019	Öldür Beni Sevgilim	Okan	Leading role

=== Television ===
Year	Television program	Role	Notes
2007	Hepsi 1	Himself	The 2007 series featured members of the music group Grup Hepsi. Boz made a guest appearance on the first season's second episode.
2007	Avrupa Yakası	Himself	A TV series that was broadcast between 2004 and 2009 on ATV. Boz was one of the artists who appeared on a special episode of Avrupa Yakası's 5th season, recorded exclusively for the new year. The episode aired on 31 December 2007 and Boz was among those who appeared in Şahika Koçarslanlı's party.
2007	Dans Eder misin?	Judge	Turkish version of So You Think You Can Dance. Boz joined the program as one of the judges.
2011–13; 2015–present	O Ses Türkiye	Judge	Turkish version of The Voice, produced by Acun Medya in Turkey. Boz joined O Ses Türkiye' as one of the four judges, and with Oğuz Berkay Fidan's victory in the first season, Boz became the winning judge of season 1.
2014–15	Yetenek Sizsiniz Türkiye	Judge	Boz joined the judging panel on the 6th season.
2018, 2019	Jet Sosyete	Himself	Episodes 20 and 28
2022	Zeytin Ağacı	Toprak	

== Awards and nominations ==
Year	Awards	Category	Nominee/work	Result	Ref(s)
2007	Golden Butterfly Awards	Best Newcomer Soloist	Murat Boz	Won	
2007	İstanbul FM Golden Awards	Best Newcomer Male Artist	Murat Boz	Won	
2007	Kral TV Video Music Awards	Best Newcomer Male Artist	Murat Boz	Won	
2009	4th Jetix Child Awards	Most Favorite Male Singer	Murat Boz	Won	
2009	İstanbul FM Golden Awards	Best Album of a Male Singer	Şans	Won	
2010	Balkan Music Awards	Best Male Artist of Balkans	Murat Boz	Nominated	
2010	Balkan Music Awards	Best Song of Balkans (from Turkey)	"Sallana Sallana"	Nominated	
2010	Pal FM Music Awards	Best Male Artist	Murat Boz	Won	
2011	4th Aslan Max Awards	Most Favorite Male Singer	Murat Boz	Won	
2011	Kral Music Awards	Best Duet	"İki Medeni İnsan"	Nominated	
2011	Radio Boğaziçi Music Awards	Best Male Artist	Murat Boz	Nominated	
2012	Golden Butterfly Awards	Best Turk Pop Music Male Soloist	Murat Boz	Won	
2012	Turkey Elle Style Awards	Male Music Star of the Year	Murat Boz	Won	
2012	EN Awards	Best Male Pop Artist	Murat Boz	Won	
2012	Gerçek Pop Awards	Best Male Artist	Murat Boz	Won	
2012	Gerçek Pop Awards	Best Single	"Geri Dönüş Olsa"	Nominated	
2012	Kral Music Awards	Best Male Artist	Murat Boz	Won	
2012	OMÜ Media Awards	Best Male Singer	Murat Boz	Nominated	
2012	Galatasaray University Awards	Best Male Pop Singer	Murat Boz	Won	
2012	Siyaset Magazine Awards	Album of the Year	Aşklarım Büyük Benden	Nominated	
2012	Siyaset Magazine Awards	Song of the Year	"Aşklarım Büyük Benden"	Nominated	
2012	Siyaset Magazine Awards	Turk Pop Music Male Artist of the Year	Murat Boz	Nominated	
2012	MGD 18th Golden Lens Awards	Male Commentator of the Year	Murat Boz	Won	
2012	World Consumer Academy Awards	Best Male Pop Artist	Murat Boz	Won	
2012	Most Special Awards of the Year	Most Special Album	Aşklarım Büyük Benden	Won	
2013	Turkey Music Awards	Best Male Artist	Murat Boz	Nominated	
2013	Pal FM Music Awards	Best Male Artist	Murat Boz	Nominated	
2013	1st European University of Lefke Awards	Best Male Vocalist	Murat Boz	Won	
2013	Haliç University 2013 Bests Awards	Best Male Pop Artist of the Year	Murat Boz	Won	
2014	Ege University 3. Media Awards	Best Male Artist	Murat Boz	Won	
2014	41st Magnum Golden Butterfly Awards	Best Turk Pop Music Male Soloist	Murat Boz	Won	
2015	Ege University 4th Media Awards	Best Male Artist	Murat Boz	Won	
2015	Ege University 4th Media Awards	Best Cover	"Elmanın Yarısı"	Won	
2015	Galatasaray University Awards	Best Male Pop Singer	Murat Boz	Won	
2015	6th İMK Social Media Awards	Best Male Singer	Murat Boz	Won	
2016	11th Makinistanbul Media, Art and Sport Awards	Best Male Artist of the Year	Murat Boz	Won	
2016	Istanbul Aydın University 12th Communication Awards	Best Movie Actor of the Year	Murat Boz	Won	
2016	DAF BAMA Music Awards	Turk Pop Music Best Male Artist	Murat Boz	Won	
2016	43rd Golden Butterfly Awards	Best Turk Pop Music Male Soloist	Murat Boz	Won	
2016	7th İMK Social Media Awards	Best Male Singer	Murat Boz	Won	
2017	1st Musiconair Awards	Best Pop Music Male Artist	Murat Boz	Won	
2017	24th İTÜ EMÖS Achievement Awards	Most Successful Album of the Year	Janti	Won	
2017	1st Turkey Child Awards	Best Song	"Adını Bilen Yazsın"	Won	
