= Cemre Kemer =

- Born: 17 February 1985 (age 41); Istanbul, Turkey
- Genres: Pop, R&B
- Occupations: Singer-songwriter; dancer; influencer
- Instruments: Vocals, piano
- Years active: 2005–present
- Labels: Stardium (2005–2008); DSM (2009–2012); Poll Production (2014–2015)

Cemre Kemer (born 17 February 1985) is a Turkish singer-songwriter, ballet dancer and social media influencer.

== Career ==
Kemer started her career by performing with the Child and Youth Ballet group at the Atatürk Cultural Center. She graduated from ballet department of Mimar Sinan Fine Arts University. After completing her singing and piano lessons, she started her career in the media by appearing in a music video for one of İsmail YK's songs. Later, she took part in the commercial called Trafikte 1 Dakika.

In 2005, she founded a girl band called "Hepsi" with her childhood friends Eren Bakıcı, Gülçin Ergül and Yasemin Yürük. This marked the breakthrough in her career. The album Bir, which she released with the band, broke sales records in Turkey, and they achieved widespread fame with the song "Bad Penny". Her mother, Şebnem Özberk, was the band's manager. In 2006, she and the band toured Turkey with Sezen Aksu under the sponsorship of Pepsi and recorded a promotional single. Later, she started to be seen in "40 Degree Parties" with Kenan Doğulu, with whom she started a relationship. Together with the band, she released the album İki in 2007. Meanwhile, she took the leading role in a TV series called Hepsi 1, which was first broadcast on Show TV and then on ATV. After this acting experience, she took part in the comedy series Avrupa Yakası and Benim Annem Bir Melek. In the same year, she starred in the movie Kısık Ateşte 15 Dakika. In 2008, together with Hepsi, she released an album called Şaka 10+1. In 2009, she took the leading role in the movie Kayıp Çocuklar Cenneti, also known as Herkesin Duyamadığı Şarkı. In 2009, she released another album called Geri Dönüşüm with Hepsi. In 2011, she went on a tour in Turkey with Kral Pop in 2011, and in 2013 she joined the dubbing cast of the movie Pinocchio. In 2015, she acted in Edis's "Benim Ol" music video. In 2016, she took part in the fashion program İşte Benim Stilim, where she announced that Hepsi would soon put an end to their hiatus, but no works were released afterwards. In 2017, she announced that she would make a solo album. However, in 2018, she stated that she was quitting music and that she would continue her career as a social media influencer. In December 2020, Kemer married Emre Medina. In 2021, they announced they were expecting their first child, a girl.

== Discography ==
=== Albums ===
- 2005 - Bir (with Hepsi)
- 2006 - İki (with Hepsi)
- 2008 - Şaka 10+1 (with Hepsi)
- 2009 - Geri Dönüşüm (with Hepsi)

=== Singles ===
- 2011 - "Şık Şık" (with Volga Tamöz, Murat Dalkılıç and Hepsi)

== Filmography ==
=== Film ===
- 2006 - Kısık Ateşte 15 Dakika - Cemre
- 2009 - Kayıp Çocuklar Cenneti - Cemre

=== TV series ===
- 2004 - Avrupa Yakası
- 2007 - Hepsi 1
- 2008 - Benim Annem Bir Melek

=== Voice acting ===
- 2013 - Pinocchio
