= Şaka (10+1) =

Studio album by Hepsi
- Released: (Turkey) 27 May 2008
- Recorded: 2007–present
- Genre: Pop, R&B
- Label: Stardium labels

Hepsi chronology
Hepsi 2 (2007)	Şaka (10+1) (2008)

Singles from Şaka
- 1. "4 Peynirli Pizza" Released: 21 May 2008

Şaka (10+1) (commonly known simply as Şaka and 10+1), is the fourth studio album by Turkish girl group Hepsi, released in May 2008. The album is the group's third album so far, and is the follow-up from their 2006 album Hepsi 2, which spawned the hit singles "Kalpsizsin" and "Aşk Sakızı".

== Album title ==
The album's title Şaka (10+1) in English means "Joke (10+1)". The "(10+1)" section of the title refers to the fact that the album consists of 11 tracks, 10 of which are famous covers, with an addition of 1 new track. The group entitled the album Joke, as all the cover songs were written by the previous artist with deep meaningful reason; however, the group stated that the tracks were songs that they grew up listening to as a child, so the same meaning of the song isn't intended and isn't to be taken so seriously.

The group's debut album was entitled Bir, translating to "One", and their previous album was named Hepsi 2, which made fans speculate that the new album would be entitled Hepsi 3 or Üç. In binary, "10+1" can be interpreted as 3.

== History ==
The album was initially supposed to be released in the summer of 2007, however the album was not released and no information regarding the album was given. In November 2007, Hepsi confirmed in an interview with the press that they were in the process of picking songs to record, and were going to begin recording the tracks at the end of December 2007.

== Style ==
Şaka (10+1) is noticeably different from other albums released from the group; this is due to it mostly consisting of cover songs. The group's first album Bir was mostly praised for the up-tempo songs which featured on the album whereas their second album was praised for the lyrics. However, with most of the songs on Şaka (10+1) being covers, the album is noticeably more vocally challenged than the other releases. The vocals are more diverse and vocal roles are shared more equally than the previous releases. The album, however, isn't dull and an imitation of the previous artists efforts, but is revived not only by vocals, but with added new up-tempo beats. This adds a sense of edge to the album, especially as the album features rap vocals from group member Eren, which fits right into the songs. In an interview with the Turkish music magazine Blue Jean, band leader Gülçin said their style went more pop with the addition of rock and electronic music elements, unlike their first two albums Bir and Hepsi 2, since they are more influenced from R&B and dance-pop.

== Promotion ==
Concert poster

On May 24, 2008, the group held a concert at the Turkcell Kuruçeşme Arena, to perform the new album to fans for the first time.

On May 16, 2008, the group featured on Tatlises Radyo to promote their new album. The show was the first time the public heard previews of the new songs. They also stated that they were going to hold concerts in several cities, including Ankara, where they performed on June 8.

On May 26, 2008 Hepsi appeared on the talk show "Duru Muhabbetler" were they performed several songs from the album including "Hep Bana", "Tavla" and "Aşk Herşeyi Affeder Mi?" On the talk show, Hepsi also announced that they will be releasing merchandise, such as stationery, bags, and T-shirts.

== Tracks ==
The album consists of 11 tracks, 10 cover songs and 1 new song. This confirms that the two tracks Hepsi recorded for the Winx Club movie soundtrack, "Sen Bir Tanesin" and "Sadece Bir Kiz", won't feature on the album as the only original song to feature on the album has been confirmed to be "4 Peynirli Pizza". The album originally wasn't going to contain any new material, however, whilst recording the cover songs, Kenan Dogulu had written a new song and offered it to the group. The group accepted the offer. A music video for "4 Peynirli Pizza" was also recorded.

=== Track listing ===
1. 4 Peynirli Pizza (4 cheesed pizza's)
2. İyisin (You're fine)
3. Yanlızlığım (My loneliness)
4. Hep Bana (All for me)
5. Aşk Herşeyi Affeder mi? (Does love forgive everything?)
6. Yaz Yaz Yaz (ft. Mustafa Ceceli) (Write Write Write)
7. Beni Kategorize Etme (Don't categorize me)
8. Tavla (attemper)
9. Sakın Gelme (Don't you dare come)
10. Onu Alma Beni Al (Don't have her, have me)
11. Sımsıkı (firmly )

== Releases ==
#	Title	Released	Produced by
1.	"4 Peynirli Pizza"	May, 2008	Kenan Doğulu

== Radio charting songs ==
Chart (2008)	Song	Peak position
Süper FM	Onu Alma Beni Al	16
Süper FM	Aşk Herşeyi Affeder Mi	14
Power Türk	4 peynirli pizza	8
İstanbul Fm	Aşk Herşeyi Affeder Mi	29
radyo viva	Onu Alma Beni Al	18
Radyo Tatlıses	4 peynirli pizza	28
Süper Fm	Tavla	18
Radyo Mega	Yaz Yaz Yaz	6
Radyo 1	Yalnızlığım	8
Radyo Tatlıses	Onu Alma Beni Al	26
Power Türk TV	4 peynirli pizza	25
Power Türk	Aşk Herşeyi Affeder Mi	22
