= Dance Mix =

Remix album by Murat Boz
- Released: 14 August 2012
- Genre: Electronic
- Length: 44:28
- Language: Turkish
- Label: Dokuz Sekiz Müzik
- Producer: Ahmet Çelenk

Murat Boz chronology
Aşklarım Büyük Benden (2011)	Dance Mix (2012)	Janti (2016)

Dance Mix is the first remix album by Turkish singer Murat Boz. It was released by Dokuz Sekiz Müzik on 14 August 2012, his only remix album to be published by this company. The album features elements of electronic music, and is Boz's first major work since the 2011 release of his third studio album Aşklarım Büyük Benden. The album was produced by Ahmet Çelenk.

Dance Mix contains remixed versions of songs from Boz's 2009 album Şans and his 2011 album Aşklarım Büyük Benden. It also include the remixed version of "Yazmışsa Bozmak Olmaz", performed by Boz for Ozan Doğulu's 2011 album 130 Bpm Allegro and originally found in Kenan Doğulu's 1993 album Yaparım Bilirsin. The album contains nine songs in total. The remixed versions of "Özledim" and "Aşkın Suçu Yok" were made by Gürsel Çelik, "Hayat Öpücüğü" by Ozan Doğulu and Uğur Kirik, "Geri Dönüş Olsa" by Erdem Kınay, and "Kalamam Arkadaş" by Kıvanch K. and Cihat Uğurel.

Two music videos were made for the album, "Özledim (Gurcell Club Mix)" and "Geri Dönüş Olsa (Erdem Kınay Remix)", both of which were directed by Nihat Odabaşı. "Hayat Öpücüğü (Ozinga Mix)" and "Geri Dönüş Olsa (Erdem Kınay Remix)" were both nominated for the Best Remix award at the 2013 Turkey Music Awards. The award was eventually given to "Hayat Öpücüğü (Ozinga Mix)".

== Background and release ==
After releasing his first studio album, Maximum, Boz continued his career with releasing two more albums: Şans (2009) and Aşklarım Büyük Benden (2011). After releasing a music video for Aşklarım Büyük Benden's lead single, Boz released four more music videos for the songs "Hayat Öpücüğü", "Geri Dönüş Olsa", "Kalamam Arkadaş" and "Bulmaca". The album's last music video, "Soyadımsın", was released in May 2012. Out of these songs, "Geri Dönüş Olsa" and "Kalamam Arkadaş", topped Turkey's official music chart. Boz was among the artists whose name appeared on Ozan Doğulu's album, 130 Bpm Allegro, in August 2011, and recorded the song "Yazmışsa Bozmak Olmaz", initially performed by Kenan Doğulu for his 1993 album Yaparım Bilirsin (1993).

On 11 July 2012, in a post on his Facebook account, Murat Boz wrote "Remixles are coming...". On 19 Jul 2012, it was reported that the countdown for Boz's remix album had begun. On 25 July, it was confirmed that Erdem Kınay, Gürsel Çelik, Kıvanch K, Ozan Çolakoğlu and Uğur Kirik would serve as the album's arrangers. On 1 August 2012, it was announced that the album would be published in the music markets under the title Dance Mix. On 14 August 2012, the album was released by Dokuz Sekiz Müzik.

== Content ==
Dance Mix features electronic music rhythms and contains nine songs in total. The remixed version of "Özledim", which originally appeared in Şans (2009), was prepared by Gürsel Çelik, and "Hayat Öpücüğü" from Aşklarım Büyük Benden was remixed by Ozan Doğulu and Uğur Kirik. "Aşkın Suçu Yok" was also remixed by Gürsel Çelik, followed by "Geri Dönüş Olsa" by Erdem Kınay, and "Kalamam Arkadaş" by Kıvanch K. and Cihat Uğurel. Aside from these songs, "Yazmışsa Bozmak Olmaz", which Boz had previously performed for Ozan Doğulu's 2011 album 130 Bpm Allegro, was remixed and included in the album.

Two music videos were later made for the songs "Özledim (Gurcell Club Mix)" and "Geri Dönüş Olsa (Erdem Kınay Remix)", both of which were directed by Nihat Odabaşı. The first of these videos was released in September 2012, followed by the other in December 2012. "Hayat Öpücüğü (Ozinga Mix)" and"Geri Dönüş Olsa (Erdem Kınay Remix)" were both nominated for the Best Remix award at the 2012 Turkey Music Awards, the first of which succeeded in receiving the award. Writing for Milliyet Sanat, Yavuz Hakan Tok said that Dance Mix did not meet his expectations and that it wouldn't "add a positive point" to Boz's discography.

== Track listing ==
No.	Title	Writer(s)	Remix producer/Arranger	Length
1.	"Özledim" (Gurcell Club Mix)	Fettah Can	Gürsel Çelik	4:56
2.	"Hayat Öpücüğü" (Ozinga Mix)	Reşit Gözdamla	Ozan Çolakoğlu	5:06
3.	"Aşkın Suçu Yok" (Gurcell Club Mix)	Çisel Onat	Gürsel Çelik	3:44
4.	"Geri Dönüş Olsa" (Erdem Kınay Remix)	Deniz Erten	Erdem Kınay	3:52
5.	"Kalamam Arkadaş" (Kıvanch K. Remix)	Ayşe Özyılmazel	Kıvanch K.	8:41
6.	"Yazmışsa Bozmak Olmaz" (with Ozan Doğulu)	Kenan Doğulu	Ozan Doğulu	4:18
7.	"Hayat Öpücüğü" (Uğur Kirik Mix)	Reşit Gözdamla	Uğur Kirik	5:06
8.	"Kalamam Arkadaş" (Cihat Uğurel Remix)	Ayşe Özyılmazel	Cihat Uğurel	4:00
9.	"Kalamam Arkadaş" (Kıvanch K. Radio Edit)	Ayşe Özyılmazel	Kıvanch K.	4:45
Total length:				44:28

== Personnel ==
- Dokuz Sekiz Müzik – production
- Ahmet Çelenk – producer
- Demet Karaduman – production coordinator
- Murat Boz – artist
- Fettah Can – songwriter, composer
- Bülent Ay – composer
- Reşit Gözdamla – songwriter, composer
- Çişel Onat – songwriter, composer
- Deniz Erten – songwriter
- Erdem Kınay – composer, arranger
- Ayşe Özyılmazel – songwriter, composer
- Mert Ekren – composer
- Kenan Doğulu – songwriter
- Ozan Doğulu – composer, arranger
- Gürsel Çelik – arranger
- Ozan Çolakoğlu – arranger
- Kıvanch K. – arranger, mixing
- Uğur Kirik – arranger
- Cihat Uğurel – arranger, mixing
- Özgür Yurtoğlu – mixing
- Suat Durmuş – mixing
- Emre Aşkın – mixing
- Arzu Alsan – mixing
- Çağrı Kodamanoğlu – mixing
- Tarık Ceran / Digilog by TC – mastering
- Lö Designers – graphic design
- Behra Ofset – printing
- Eliz Sakuçoğlu – management, pr
- Hakan Özgül / Akademi Organizasyon – reservation agency

Credits adapted from Dance Mix's album booklet.

== Release history ==
Country	Date	Format	Label
Turkey	14 August 2012	CD · digital download	Dokuz Sekiz Müzik
Worldwide	14 August 2012	Digital download	Dokuz Sekiz Müzik
