= Hayat Sana Güzel =

Single by Murat Boz
- Released: 17 March 2010
- Recorded: 2010
- Genre: Pop, Dance
- Length: 22:44
- Label: DSM
- Songwriter: Soner Sarıkabadayı

Murat Boz singles chronology
| "İki Medeni İnsan" (2010) | "Hayat Sana Güzel" (2010) | "Buralardan Giderim" (2010) |

Hayat Sana Güzel (English: Life is Beautiful to You) is a song by Turkish artist Murat Boz, taken from his forthcoming third studio album. The song is the third official single to be physically released, fourth overall to receive a digital release and eleventh to have a music video. The song is also theme from the Soda-pop advert "Yedigün". The song was released on 17 March 2010. However, the song was not included on the final track list of his third studio album Aşklarım Büyük Benden for unknown reasons.

== Track list ==
| No. | Title | Writer(s) | English | Length |
|---|---|---|---|---|
| 1. | "Hayat Sana Güzel" | Soner Sarıkabadayı | Life is Beautiful to You | 4:44 |
| 2. | "Hayat Sana Güzel (Suat Aydoğan Remix)" | Soner Sarıkabadayı | Life is Beautiful to You | 4:28 |
| 3. | "Hayat Sana Güzel (Burak Yeter Remix)" | Soner Sarıkabadayı | Life is Beautiful to You | 5:00 |
| 4. | "Hayat Sana Güzel (Karaoke Version 1)" | Soner Sarıkabadayı | Life is Beautiful to You | 4:44 |
| 5. | "Hayat Sana Güzel (Karaoke Version 2)" | Soner Sarıkabadayı | Life is Beautiful to You | 4:28 |
