= 4 Peynirli Pizza =

Single by Hepsi

from the album Şaka
- Released: Turkey May 2008
- Recorded: 2008
- Genre: Pop
- Length: 3:22
- Label: Stardium Labels
- Songwriter(s): Kenan Doğulu

Hepsi singles chronology
"Sen Bir Tanesin" (2008)	"4 Peynirli Pizza" (2008)

"4 Peynirli Pizza" is a pop song by group Hepsi. It is the lead single released from the album Şaka (10+1). It is the only original song in the album.

== Meaning ==
"4 Peynirli Pizza" means "4 Cheesed Pizza" in English. "Four" refers to the "Hepsi" members.

== Music video ==
On May 13, 2008, Hepsi won the award for best group at the Kral music awards, the group weren't present to receive the award, so their management accepted the award on their behalf and stated that Hepsi weren't present due to them recording the music video.

Behind the scenes footage of the making of the video was aired on the Turkish music channel "Numberone T.V", similar to MTVs "Making the video". The video directed by Seda Çalışır. The concept of the video is based on the group opening a pizza shop. The group only let males to enter the shop and once the entered they were then hypnotize. The video features actors from their TV show Hepsi 1. Instead of having their colours motifs in their cloths, as the commonly did in previous music video's, the girls have an object which represents them, Yasemin's being a mirror and Gulcin's being a cat. The video was released on May 23, 2008.

== Radio lists in Turkey ==
Chart (2008)	Peak position
Radyo D	32
Power Türk TV	8
Radyo Tatlıses	28
