= Şans =

Studio album by Murat Boz
- Released: 25 February 2009
- Recorded: 2008
- Genre: Pop, Dance-pop, R&B
- Length: 56:37
- Label: DSM
- Producer: Ahmet Çelenk

Murat Boz chronology
Uçurum (2008)	Şans (2009)	Aşklarım Büyük Benden (2011)

Şans (Chance) is the second studio album by Turkish singer Murat Boz. It was released on 25 February 2009 by Dokuz Sekiz Müzik. The album contains eleven new songs plus the singles of Boz's previous EP Uçurum. The release of the album marked Boz's second major work since Maximum (2007). Boz worked with Soner Sarıkabadayı, Ersay Üner, Fettah Can and Mustafa Ceceli for the album, and wrote some of the songs by himself.

The first music video from Şans was released for the song "Para Yok" on 9 January 2009. The music video for "Özledim", written by Fettah Can, was released on 16 April 2009. On 15 June, the music video for "Her Şeyi Yak" was released, followed by "Sallana Sallana" on 12 August, and "Gümbür Gümbür" on 15 December. The album's sixth music video was released for the song "İki Medeni İnsan", on which Soner Sarıkabadayı was featured. The album's last video was released on 9 September 2010 for the song "Buralardan Giderim".

Şans is a pop and R&B album. It generally received positive reviews from critics and won the Best Album award at the İstanbul FM Golden Awards.

== Background and recording ==
In Murat Boz's opinion, Şans was a more successful work compared to his previous album Maximum. The album was recorded in 2008. Boz discussed the album in an interview: "I'm very assertive because it's not an individual business; teamwork is very important. My team has been very solid on this album. I renewed the whole team. I'm a man who loves innovations and I'm growing more with innovations, and I've done what I needed to do in this album." He also stated the songs in the album contained a general meaning.

== Composition ==
=== Music and lyrics ===
The main songwriter for Şans is Soner Sarıkabadayı. Murat Boz also wrote three songs for the album. According to some critics, Boz was influenced by Tarkan in writing the songs.

== Music videos ==
The song "Para Yok" was chosen as the lead single of Şans, and its music video was released on 9 January 2009, two months before the album's release. In March 2009, it was announced that the song "Özledim", Fettah Can, would also be turned into a music video. It was directed by Murad Küçük and released on 16 April 2009. The third music video was made for the album's most outstanding song, "Her Şeyi Yak". It was directed by Emir Khalilzadeh and released on 15 June 2009. The music video for "Sallana Sallana" was made out of the footage of one of Boz's concerts and released on 12 August 2009. On 15 December 2009, the album's fifth music video, "Gümbür Gümbür", was released. It was followed by "İki Medeni İnsan". For the music video, the song's writer, Soner Sarıkabadayı, appeared as the featured artist, while the solo version was sold on digital platforms. The video was first broadcast on 11 February 2010 on Kral TV. The album's last music video, "Buralardan Giderim", was directed by Burak Ertaş and released on 9 September 2010.

== Critical reception ==
Professional ratings
Review scores
Source	Rating
Michael Show	(favorable)
Gerçek Pop	2/5 stars

Şans received mixed reviews from music critics. Radioman Michael Kuyucu gave the album a favorable review. Kuyucu wrote in his review: "With a sound of good quality, compositions above the average, and a successful visual work, Murat Boz seems to increase his chance in the music industry with his album new album Şans," and mentioned that Boz had to do a good job in promoting the album. Gerçek Pop gave the album a negative review. The website chose "Özledim" as the most successful work in the album, and gave Şans two out of five stars.

== Achievements ==
On its first week of release, Şans ranked first on "D&R Best-Selling List" and "Esenshop Best-Selling List". According to MÜ-YAP, the album sold 17,000 copies within four months. "Özledim" was viewed over ten million times on YouTube, followed by "İki Medeni İnsan" with five million views, and the songs "Sallana Sallana", "Buralardan Giderim" and "Gümbür Gümbür", which garnered one million views each.

== Track listing ==
No.	Title	Writer(s)	Arranger(s)	Length
1.	"İki Medeni İnsan"	Soner Sarıkabadayı	Mert Ali İçelli	4:00
2.	"İstanbul Eğlencesi featuring Ersay Üner"	Ersay Üner	Mustafa Ceceli	3:58
3.	"Her Şeyi Yak"	Soner Sarıkabadayı	Suat Aydoğan	4:46
4.	"Özledim"	Fettah Can	Sinan Ceceli	4:25
5.	"Gümbür Gümbür"	Murat Boz	Sinan Ceceli	3:22
6.	"Para Yok"	Ersay Üner	Mustafa Ceceli	3:52
7.	"Buralardan Giderim"	Fettah Can	Mustafa Ceceli	3:36
8.	"Sallana Sallana"	Soner Sarıkabadayı	Suat Aydoğan	4:23
9.	"Görmemişim Duymamışım"	Murat Boz	Mustafa Ceceli	4:11
10.	"Hatun Yıkılır"	Murat Boz	Sinan Ceceli	3:35
11.	"Sallana Sallana (Version) featuring Soner Sarıkabadayı"	Soner Sarıkabadayı	Mert Ali İçelli	3:56
12.	"Uçurum"	Soner Sarıkabadayı	Suat Aydoğan	5:12
13.	"Ben Aslında"	Fettah Can	Ceyhun Çelikten	3:42
14.	"Ötme Bülbül"	Murat Boz	Özgür Yedievli	3:46
Total length:				56:37

== Personnel ==
Credits adapted from Şans's album booklet.

- Dokuz Sekiz Müzik - production
- Ahmet Çelenk - producer
- İlhan Özcan - general coordinator
- Demet Karaduman - production coordinator
- Miles Showell / Metropolis / London - mastering
- Murat Boz - vocals, songwriter, composer
- Soner Sarıkabadayı - vocals, songwriter, composer
- Mert Ali İçelli - arranger, mixing, recording
- Ersay Üner - vocals, songwriter, composer
- Mustafa Ceceli - arranger, mixing, accordion
- Seda Seber - recording
- Yaşar Akpençe - goblet drum
- dB Music - studio
- Suat Aydoğan - director, arranger, keyboard
- Ferhan Taştekin - arranger assistant
- Sezgin Şengöz - arranger assistant
- Fettah Can - songwriter, composer
- Sinan Ceceli - arranger
- Erdem Sökmen - guitar
- Levent Demirbaş - studio
- İstanbul Strings - bowed string instruments
- Fatih Ahıskalı - cümbüş
- Ceyhun Çelikten - arranger
- Özgür Yedievli - arranger
- Gündem - bowed string instrument
- Sinem Yalçınkaya - backing vocals
- Gökhan Ertem - photography
- Elif Sakuçoğlu - stylist, management, press and public relations
- Cevat Aydın - hair
- Çetin Koyuncu - make-up
- Özgürarcan - graphics
- Esen - distribution
