= List of Hepsi 1 episodes =

The following is an episode list for the show Hepsi 1. As of December 29, 2007, 30 episodes had aired.

== Season 1: 2007 ==
No. overall	No. in season	Title	Original release date
1	1	"Hepimiz Biriz"	May 17, 2007
2	2	"Arkadaşlik fedakarlik ister"	May 24, 2007
3	3	"Kim bu kızlar?"	May 28, 2007
4	4	"İyilik yap, iyilik bul!"	June 5, 2007
5	5	"Kalpsizsin"	June 10, 2007

== Season 2: 2007-2008 ==
No. overall	No. in season	Title	Original release date
22	1	"Peşinden Gidecek Cesaretiniz Varsa, Bütün Rüyalar Gerçek Olabilir"	October 28, 2007
23	2	""Aşk mı, Para mı? Klasik mi, Modern mi?"	November 4, 2007
24	3	"Mutluluk, Sahip Olduklarımızın Kıymetini Bilmektir"	November 11, 2007
25	4	"Gerçekleşen Her Dileğin Arkasında Umut ve Cesaret Vardır"	November 18, 2007
26	5	"Aşk, Acı çekmektir"	November 25, 2007
27	6	"Amaç, Sevgi Uğruna Ölmek Değil, Uğruna Ölünecek Sevgi Bulmaktır"	December 2, 2007
28	7	"Aşk Herşeyi Affeder mi?"	December 9, 2007
29	8	"Gerçek Aşk Engel Tanımaz"	December 16, 2007
30	9	"Aşkın Gururu Olmaz"	December 30, 2007
31	10	"Her yeni yil, yeni bir umut demektir!"	January 3, 2008
32	11	"Mutluluk parayla satın alınmaz"	January 12, 2008
33	12	"Iyiler her zaman kazanır"	January 19, 2008
34	13	"Kaçan Her Zaman Kovalanır"	January 26, 2008
35	14	"Hayal gücünün sizi götüremeyeceği hiç bir yer yoktur!"	January 31, 2008
36	15	"-"	February 7, 2008
37	16	"-"	February 14, 2008
38	17	"Her mutluluğun bir hüznü, her hüznünde bir mutluluğu vardır"	February 22, 2008
39	18	"Bir sırrı saklamanın en iyi yolu, o sırrı unutmaktır"	February 28, 2008
40	19	"Şuna inanmak lazımdır ki, dünya üzerinde gördüğümüz her şey kadının eseridir. - Mustafa Kemal Atatürk"	March 5, 2008
41	20	"Aşkın gözü kördür"	March 12, 2008
42	21	"Gideceğiniz yeri bilmiyorsanız, vardığınız yerin önemi yoktur"	March 19, 2008
