= Uçurum =

EP by Murat Boz
- Released: 22 June 2008
- Recorded: 2007–2008
- Genres: Pop, R&B
- Length: 36:33
- Label: DSM

Murat Boz chronology
Maximum (2007)	Uçurum (2008)	Şans (2009)

Uçurum (Cliff) is the first EP by Turkish pop singer Murat Boz. It was released by DSM on 22 July 2008. It was Boz's first major work since the release of his first studio album Maximum (2007). The EP contains three songs and five remix versions. Its only music video was released for the song "Uçurum".

== Background ==
At the beginning of June 2008, Murat Boz announced that he was preparing a new EP and later shared the official photos for this work. On the subject of creating the main concept and image for this project, Boz said: "It was the idea of my press consultant and brand consultant Selim Akar from Starevi. This idea was also approved by my producer Ahmet Çelenk from DSM and we shot the photos. This community is a huge arena. And we are in a war, whether we like it or not. There's a power war in this arena. The strong can survive. I believe in my power and my talent, and I am always ready for war. So I'm ready to fight the harsh conditions in this market." In the following days it was announced that the EP would be titled Uçurum after its lead single, which was written by Soner Sarıkabadayı.

== Reception ==
Radioman Michael Kuyucu commented on the EP by saying: ""Ben Aslında" and "Ötme Bülbül" are in line with Murat Boz's previous work Maximum, while "Uçurum" is a bit more commercial and a style that Murat Boz has tried for the first time. Working with Suat Aydoğan made him go out of the way in which he had worked to this day. Soner Sarıkabayı's composition of "Uçurum" is of high quality. [...] It's a pretty tampered, studied project. Murat Boz is a very talented and is a singer with a bright future. He can be Tarkan's biggest competitor with projects that are suitable for him."

== Track listing ==
No.	Title	Writer(s)	Arranger(s)	Length
1.	"Ben Aslında"	Fettah Can	Ceyhun Çelikten	3:42
2.	"Ötme Bülbül"	Murat Boz	Özgür Yedievli	3:41
3.	"Uçurum"	Soner Sarıkabadayı	Suat Aydoğan	5:20
4.	"Uçurum (Özgür Version)"	Soner Sarıkabadayı	Özgür Yedievli	4:20
5.	"Ötme Bülbül (Alaturka Version)"	Murat Boz	Özgür Yedievli	3:46
6.	"Uçurum (Original Mix)"	Soner Sarıkabadayı	Burak Yeter	4:12
7.	"Uçurum (Yalçın Aşan Project)"	Soner Sarıkabadayı	Yalçın Aşan	5:23
8.	"Uçurum (Extended Mix)"	Soner Sarıkabadayı	Burak Yeter	6:13
Total length:				36:33
