= 3 (Murat Boz album) =

Studio album by Murat Boz
- Released: 7 March 2024
- Genre: Pop
- Length: 42:43
- Label: Boz Production

Murat Boz chronology
Janti (2016)	3 (2024)

3 is the fifth studio album by Turkish singer Murat Boz. It was released on 7 March 2024 by Boz Production in collaboration with Doğan Music Company.

== Background ==
Murat Boz launched a "digital transformation" process during the pandemic. He first gained attention with his single "Harbi Güzel", which reached number one on numerous charts. Having released only singles since Janti (2016), Boz began working on an album that lasted two years.

== Content and personnel ==
The song "Çok Sevdik", written and composed by Emrah Karakuyu and arranged by Ozan Bayraşa, was selected as a promotional single and released together with a music video. The video was directed by Ecem Lawton. All filming took place in the USA. Boz later announced the album 3 and added that all songs would be released with lyric videos on online platforms. Shortly thereafter, he announced on his Instagram account that the album would consist of 14 songs.

It was announced that the album would be released on Boz's birthday. The second single, "Derin Mevzular," was released on all platforms on 23 June 2023. The song, along with the music video and music, also attracted attention for its songwriting. 12 songwriters contributed to the lyrics. The album 3 was released on the same date as "Derin Mevzular". The music video was once again directed by Ecem Lawton. A video for the song "Yollarda Kayboldum" was released later in February 2025 using artificial intelligence.

The album's songwriters include Emrah Karakuyu, Onur Özdemir, Mert Çodur, Ömer Akkaya, Umur Doma, Ozan Bayraşa, Murat Ercan, Ege İpek Tokatlı, Bade Derinöz, Murat Alp Mutlu, Berkay Altunyay, Emir Akbulut, Mela Bedel, Alperen Demir, Ozan Bayraşa, Mert Çodur, Emir Akbulut, Gökhan Türkmen, Mert Carim, İbrahim Halil Başaran, İbrahim Küçükoğlu, Günay Çoban, and Serkan İzzet Özdoğan. Composition, arrangements, and mastering were handled by Emrah Karakuyu, Onur Özdemir, Ozan Çolakoğlu, Mert Çodur, Ege İpek Tokatlı, Emir Akbulut, Çağrı Telkıvıran, Sabri Saltiel, and Gürsel Çelik. Mixing was done by Emre Kıral. Boz serves as both lead and occasionally backing vocalist. Backing vocalists Dila Uzun, Ozan Bayraşa contributed to a diverse mix of tracks.

The album's photographs were shot by Gianni Gallant, and Şener Engin served as assistant producer. Production was completed in Los Angeles, USA. The album generally features a blend of high rock and pop tracks.

== Reception ==
Prior to the album's release, Sinem Vural from Hürriyet said "It's 'album time' for pop and alternative music", and added that she believes the focus should be on producing albums rather than singles, and that she supports Murat Boz's decision to release a new album. She wrote a favorable review on the album following its release. Mayk Şişman from Milliyet said that Murat Boz aimed to take his career one step further quality and quantity wise with this album and showered praise on the album.

== Track listing ==
3
No.	Title	Writer(s)	Composer(s)	Length
1.	"Çok Sevdik"	Emrah Karakuyu	Karakuyu	2:57
2.	"Adın Orada"	Onur Özdemir	Özdemir · Ozan Çolakoğlu	3:16
3.	"Derin Mevzular"	Mert Çodur · Ömer Akkaya · Umur Doma · Ozan Bayraşa · Murat Ercan · Ege İpek Tokatlı · Bade Derinöz · Murat Alp Mutlu · Berkay Altunyay · Emir Akbulut · Mela Bedel · Alperen Demir · Mert Çodur	Bayraşa · Çodur · Tokatlı · Akbulut	2:51
4.	"Gözdeki Maviye"	Karakuyu	Karakuyu · Bayraşa	2:56
5.	"Yollarda Kayboldum"	Gökhan Türkmen · Mert Carim	Çolakoğlu	3:13
6.	"Çığlık"	İbrahim Halil Başaran · İbrahim Küçükoğlu	Küçükoğlu · Çolakoğlu	2:19
7.	"Nasıl Aldandım"	Carim	Carim	3:49
8.	"Unutur Mu Sanıyorsun"	Carim	Carim	2:57
9.	"Sükut-u Bende"	Özdemir	Çağrı Telkıvıran	2:42
10.	"Bi' Kerecik"	Özlem Güneykaya	Telkıvıran	2:51
11.	"Üç Cümle"	Karakuyu	Karakuyu · Sabi Saltiel	3:03
12.	"Ayrılık Hırkası"	Carim	Gürsel Çelik	3:04
13.	"Aşkın Darağacı"	Güney Çoban · Serkan İzzet Özdoğan	Çelik	3:19
14.	"Aşk Geçti Bizden"	Çoban · Özdoğan	Çelik	3:21
Total length:				42:43
