= Vazgeçmem =

Single by Murat Boz
- Released: 19 April 2013
- Recorded: 2013
- Genre: Pop, dance
- Label: DMC

Murat Boz singles chronology
"Geri Dönüş Olsa (Erdem Kınay Remix)" (2012)	"Vazgeçmem" (2013)

"Vazgeçmem" (English: "I Don't Give Up") is a song by Turkish singer Murat Boz, taken from his fourth studio album. The song is the first official single to receive only a digital release and 23rd to have a music video. The song was written by Deniz Erten and arranged by Mustafa Ceceli and was released by the label DMC (Doğan Music Company). The song reached the 3rd position on Türkçe Top 20, and on Türkçe Pop charted at no.1 as well as on the music digital sales on Turkey. Murat Boz performed the song live for the first time at the Turkish Music Awards. The digital single featured the album version and one remix, both produced by the singer Mustafa Ceceli, and the music video was directed by Nihat Odabaşı.

== Track listing ==
No.	Title	Lyrics	Music	Arrangement	Length
1.	"Vazgeçmem"	Deniz Erten	Osman Çetin	Mustafa Ceceli	3:30
2.	"Vazgeçmem (V.2)"	Deniz Erten	Osman Çetin	Mustafa Ceceli	3:37
