= Aşkı Bulamam Ben =

Single by Murat Boz
- Released: 21 July 2006
- Recorded: 2006
- Genre: Crunk
- Length: 14:01
- Label: Stardium
- Songwriter: Nil Karaibrahimgil
- Producer: Nil Karaibrahimgil - Ozan Çolakoğlu

Murat Boz singles chronology
"Aşkı Bulamam Ben" (2006)	"Maximum" (2007)

"Aşkı Bulamam Ben" (English: I Cannot Find Love) is the first single of Turkish singer Murat Boz. After the success of "Aşkı Bulamam Ben" Murat Boz released his first album Maximum which featured this single. The single consists of 2 songs and 2 versions. The video of the song, Aşkı Bulamam Ben helped him to win the Kral TV's 2006's Best New Male Artist Prize.

== Track list ==
No.	Title	Writer(s)	English	Length
1.	"Aşkı Bulamam Ben"	Nil Karaibrahimgil	I Can't Find Love	3:48
2.	"Umrumda Değilsin (Hatço)"	Tufan Bayraktar, Ozan Çolakoğlu, Serkan Dinçer	You Don't Impress Me	4:38
3.	"Aşkı Bulamam Ben (Ozinga Remix)"	Nil Karaibrahimgil	I Can't Find Love	3:46
4.	"Aşkı Bulamam Ben (Bebe Remix)"	Nil Karaibrahimgil	I Can't Find Love	3:29

== Chart ==
Album	Single	Peak
Album	Single	Turkey
Maximum	"Aşkı Bulamam Ben"	3
