= Aşklarım Büyük Benden =

Studio album by Murat Boz
- Released: 9 January 2011
- Genre: Pop
- Length: 36:04
- Label: DSM

Murat Boz chronology
Şans (2009)	Aşklarım Büyük Benden (2011)	Dance Mix (2012)

Aşklarım Büyük Benden (My Loves Are Greater Than Me) is the third studio album by Turkish singer Murat Boz. It was released on 9 May 2011 by Dokuz Sekiz Müzik. Boz's first studio album since Şans (2009), Aşklarım Büyük Benden is a pop album and was produced by Boz himself.

The album contains nine songs in total and received positive reviews from critics, who described it as "a good orientation" in Boz's music career. The alum's lead single, "Aşklarım Büyük Benden", was released together with a music video in April 2011. After the album's eventual release, more music videos were released for the songs "Hayat Öpücüğü", "Geri Dönüş Olsa", "Kalamam Arkadaş", "Bulmaca" and "Soyadımsın". Out of these songs, "Geri Dönüş Olsa" and "Kalamam Arkadaş" ranked first on Türkçe Top 20.

Aşklarım Büyük Benden sold 35,000 and received the Most Special Album award at the award ceremony organized by Kadir Has University. To promote the album, Boz performed his songs on programs such as Beyaz Show, Şeffaf Oda, and O Ses Türkiye, and gave concerts at various places in Turkey. He later released the remixed version of some of these songs in a compilation album titled Dance Mix in August 2012.

== Background and release ==
Murat Boz's second studio album, Şans was released in February 2009 and he continued to release various music videos for the album until late 2010. In April 2010, he also released the single "Hayat Sana Güzel". During an interview in May 2010, Boz said that he would release the album in summer. In December 2010, it was reported that Boz had traveled to London to work on his new album and that it would have "a more mature appeal". Boz also said that all of the songs on the album would be "catchy".

In Mart 2011, Murat Boz announced on his Facebook page that he was still working on the album and asked his fans to "be ready for surprises in April." On 12 April 2011, the album's lead single "Aşklarım Büyük Benden" was released on digital platforms and it was confirmed that the album would also bear the same title. At the end of the same month, some of the lyrics of the songs were shared with the audience. The album was released on 9 May 2011 by Dokuz Sekiz Müzik. Murat Boz claimed that the songs on the album were a combination of his experiences. He also added that the songs were chosen in accordance with his mood.

Aşklarım Büyük Benden was produced by Murat Boz and contains nine songs in total. Pop singer and songwriter Fettah Can and Ayşe Özyılmazel were among the album's songwriters. Can wrote the songs "Aşklarım Büyük Benden" and "Soyadımsın", while Özyılmazel wrote "Kalamam Arkadaş". The songs were arranged and composed by Mert Ali İçelli, Erdem Kınay, Ozan Doğulu, Mert Ekren and Mustafa Ceceli. The album sold 35,000 copies in total and received the Most Special Album award at the award ceremony organized by Kadir Has University. It was also nominated for the Best Album award at the Siyaset Dergisi award ceremony.

== Critical reception ==
Aşklarım Büyük Benden received positive reviews from music critics and its lyrics and compositions were praised. Radioman Michael Kuyucu described the album as "cool" and stated the singer was taking "confident steps in the right way". He also added that the first remarkable thing in the album was Boz's choice of "meaningful songs". DJ and radio programmer Olcay Tanberken gave the album a positive review and wrote that it was an album that pushed Boz "into the period of maturity" in his career. Music website Gerçek Pop also gave the album a favorable review and gave it 3.5 out of 5 stars. The website stated that the album contained mostly "medium tempo" songs, and the song "Aşkın Suçu Yok" would satisfy "those who want to listen to songs" such as "Her Şeyi Yak" and "Sallana Sallana", which appeared in Boz's previous album. The orientation that he had chosen with this album was found much better "for our music industry [...] and for himself". The website also gave 3 stars out of 5 to the album's cover design. The music website Popüler Müzik Notları also published a positive review on the album. The website found this album as "a mix of his two previous albums" and named the song "Geri Dönüş Olsa" as its "most original song".

== Music videos ==
Six music videos were released for Aşklarım Büyük Benden. The first music video was made for the album's lead single "Aşklarım Büyük Benden", which was released on 13 April 2011. The video was directed by Burak Ertaş, who also took the album's photographs, and model Sonja Wronski appeared alongside Boz on it. On 27 May 2011, the album's second music video "Hayat Öpücüğü" was released. It was directed by Murad Küçük and Slovak model Andrea Lehotska accompanied the singer on the video. In the video, Boz demonstrated a love story that ends as a result of a car accident. The music video for "Geri Dönüş Olsa" was recorded in late August and directed by Tülay İbak. It was released on 9 September 2011. "Geri Dönüş Olsa" ranked first on Türkçe Top 20. The fourth music video was made for the song "Kalamam Arkadaş". It was directed by Korhan Bozkurt and released on 28 November 2011. Similar to "Geri Dönüş Olsa", the song ranked number one on Turkey's official music chart. The fifth and sixth music videos, "Bulmaca" and "Soyadımsın", were released on 12 March and 8 May 2012 respectively. The people who appeared together with Boz on the video for "Soyadımsın" were chosen following the result of a contest.

== Track listing ==
No.	Title	Writer(s)	Composer(s)	Length
1.	"Hayat Öpücüğü"	Reşit Gözdamla	Reşit Gözdamla · Mert Ali İçelli	4:13
2.	"Aşklarım Büyük Benden"	Cansu Kurtcu	Fettah Can	4:06
3.	"Soyadımsın"	Fettah Can	Fettah Can	4:19
4.	"Bulmaca"	Gökhan Şahin	Emrah Karaduman	4:13
5.	"Bize Kıyma"	Elif Nun İçelli	Elif Nun İçelli	4:21
6.	"Geri Dönüş Olsa"	Deniz Erten	Erdem Kınay	3:18
7.	"Korkma"	Gülşah Tütüncü	Gülşah Tütüncü	4:24
8.	"Kalamam Arkadaş"	Ayşe Özyılmazel	Mert Ekren · Ayşe Özyılmazel	3:12
9.	"Aşkın Suçu Yok"	Çisel Onat	Çisel Onat	3:51
Total length:				36:04

== Personnel ==
Credits adapted from Aşklarım Büyük Benden's album booklet.

- Dokuz Sekiz Müzik – production
- Ahmet Çelenk – producer
- Murat Boz – singer, producer
- Demet Karaduman – general coordinator
- Reşit Gözdamla – songwriter, composer
- Bülent Ay – composer
- Mert Ali İçelli – composer, arranger, mixing
- Cansu Kurtcu – songwriter
- Fettah Can – songwriter, composer
- Gökhan Şahin – songwriter
- Emrah Karaduman – composer
- Elif Nun İçelli – songwriter
- Deniz Erten – songwriter
- Erdem Kınay – composer, arranger
- Ayşe Özyılmazel – songwriter, composer
- Mert Ekren – composer, arranger
- Gülşah Tütüncü – songwriter, composer
- Ozan Doğulu – arranger
- Çisel Onat – songwriter, composer
- Mustafa Ceceli – arranger
- Candan Köker – mixing
- Suat Durmuş – mixing
- Arzu Alsan – mixing
- Tarık Ceran – mixing
- Metropolis London – mastering
- Burak Ertaş – photography
- CVT Hairdesign (Cevat Aydın) – hair
- Çetin Koyuncu – make-up
- Elif Sakuçoğlu – stylist, director
- Özgürarcan – graphic
- Behra Ofset – printing
- Esen Dağıtım – distribution
- Akademi Organizasyon (Hakan Özgül) – reservation agency
- Eliz Sakuçoğlu – management

== Release history ==
Country	Date	Format	Label
Turkey	9 May 2011	CD, digital download	Dokuz Sekiz Müzik
Worldwide	9 May 2011	Digital download	Dokuz Sekiz Müzik
