= Kalpsizsin =

Single by Hepsi

from the album Hepsi 2
- Released: 2006
- Recorded: 2006–2007
- Genre: Pop
- Songwriter(s): Gülçin Ergül, Şebnem Özberk
- Producer(s): Ozan DOĞULU

Hepsi singles chronology
"Tempo" (2006)	"Kalpsizsin" (2006)	"Aşk Sakızı" (2007)

"Kalpsizsin" is a pop song by Turkish girl group Hepsi. It is the first single released from their second studio album, Hepsi 2 (2007). Due to the album-orientated nature of the Turkish music industry this single was not physically or digitally released; it was only released through airplay and through receiving play on music channels.

An episode of Hepsi 1 was named after the song.

== Music video ==
During the music video, Group Hepsi can be seen making a voodoo doll as Eren sings the first verse of the song. Throughout the video the girls hit the doll with a baseball bat which is followed by a clip of a guy in bed in pain in the same places as the doll was hit.

The girls have frizzy hair and wear different coloured outfits, dancing and singing in an enclosed set with mirrors. This is followed by another dance scene with umbrellas with backup dancers and then another dance scene. As the video ends the last scene is a clip of the voodoo doll swinging from a noose.

== Awards ==
Kalpsizsin gave the girls their second nomination in a year for Best Group on the Kral TV Video Music Awards, which they won again.
