= Geç Olmadan =

Single by Murat Boz
- Released: 7 May 2018
- Genre: Pop
- Length: 3:26
- Label: DMC
- Songwriter: Murat Boz · Ümit Sayın

"Geç Olmadan" (English: Before It's Too Late) is the fifth single by Turkish singer Murat Boz. It was released by Doğan Music Company as the annual commercial song for Cornetto in Turkey.

== Track listing ==
Digital download

1. "Geç Olmadan" – 3:26

== Charts ==
Chart (2018)	Peak position
Turkey (MusicTopTR Official Chart)	9

== Release history ==
Country	Date	Format(s)	Label	Ref.
Turkey	7 May 2018	Digital download	Doğan Music Company	
Worldwide	7 May 2018	Digital download	Doğan Music Company	
