= Maximum (song) =

Single by Murat Boz
- Released: 2007
- Recorded: 2007
- Genre: Crunk
- Label: Stardium

Murat Boz singles chronology
"Aşkı Bulamam Ben" (2007)	"Maximum" (2007)	"Püf" (2008)

"Maximum" is the second single from Turkish singer Murat Boz. The song is from the album Maximum, which produced the previous hit "Aşkı Bulamam Ben". The song is currently the most successful song of Murat Boz's career charting on the European top 100 chart at 99. Even though this is seen as a low position it is in some way quite an achievement as it is uncommon for Turkish artists to appear on this chart.

== Chart ==
Album	Single	Chart
Album	Single	Turkey
Maximum	"Maximum"	1
