= Janti (album) =

Studio album by Murat Boz
- Released: 14 June 2016
- Genre: Pop
- Length: 44:09
- Label: DMC

Murat Boz chronology
Dance Mix (2012)	Janti (2016)

Janti (Cool) is the fourth studio album by Turkish singer Murat Boz. It was released on 8 April 2016 by Doğan Music Company.

== Release and content ==
Janti was Boz's first studio album in 5 years. It contains 12 songs in total.

The composers who worked on the album were Sıla, Soner Sarıkabadayı, Oğuzhan Koç, Fettah Can, Alper Narman, Cansu Kurtçu, Onurr, Ersay Üner, Kadir Mutlu, and Leyla Özöksüz. Boz also wrote and composed two of the album's songs: "Elveda Deme" and "Siyah Gün". Ozan Çolakoğlu, Mustafa Ceceli, Emrah Karaduman and Gürsel Çelik served as the album's music arrangers. Ebru Gündeş was featured on the song "Gün Ağardı", the album's only duet. The album's photographs were taken by Emre Ünal, and İpek Ersoy served as Boz's stylist during the process.

== Track listing ==
Janti
No.	Title	Writer(s)	Composer(s)	Length
1.	"Janti"	Onur Özdemir · Alper Narman	Özdemir · Narman · Gürsel Çelik	3:22
2.	"Üzüm"	Kadir Mutlu	Kadir Mutlu · Fotios Stefos	3:22
3.	"Elveda Deme"	Murat Boz	Boz	4:04
4.	"Direniyorsun"	Fettah Can · Cansu Kurtçu	Can	3:20
5.	"Gün Ağardı" (feat. Ebru Gündeş)	Leyla Özöksüz	Özöksüz	4:38
6.	"Temelli"	Sıla	Gençoğlu · Efe Bahadır	3:51
7.	"Bir Dünya"	Soner Sarıkabadayı	Sarıkabadayı	3:10
8.	"Siyah Gün"	Boz	Boz	3:29
9.	"Adını Bilen Yazsın"	Mutlu	Kadir Mutlu · Stefos	3:43
10.	"Yüzüm Yok"	Oğuzhan Koç	Koç	4:29
11.	"Can Havli"	Kurtçu	Kurtçu · Can	3:15
12.	"Yana Döne"	Ersay Üner	Üner	3:26
Total length:				44:09

== Sales ==
Country	Sales
Turkey (MÜ-YAP)	50,000

== Release history ==
Country	Date	Format(s)	Label
Turkey	8 April 2016	CD · Digital download	DMC
Worldwide	8 April 2016	Digital download	DMC
