= Yalan =

Single by Hepsi

from the album Bir
- Released: 2005
- Recorded: 2005
- Genre: Pop; R&B
- Length: 3:40
- Label: Stardium labels
- Songwriter: Süleyman Yüksel
- Producer: Temel Zümrüt

Hepsi singles chronology
"Olmaz Oğlan" (2005)	"Yalan" (2005)	"Üç Kalp" (2005)

"Yalan" (English translation: "Lie" - as in: not telling the truth) is a song from Turkish girl group Hepsi's debut album, Bir (2005). The song features vocals from Turkish pop musician Murat Boz; Boz, however, does not appear in the video. Yalan follows "Olmaz Oğlan" as Hepsi's second single.

== Music video ==
The video begins with each of the girls contained in a cube along with items of matching the colour. The sequence continues on stage with a dance routine; a screen is then lowered showing the girls performing a different dance routine with a male model while accompanied by Boz's vocals.

Choreography by Selatin Kara.
