= Hepsi 1 =

- Starring: Eren Bakıcı; Cemre Kemer; Gülçin Ergül; Yasemin Yürük
- Country of origin: Turkey
- No. of seasons: 2
- No. of episodes: 51 (list of episodes)

Production
- Running time: 120 minutes approx. (including adverts)

Original release
- Network: ATV
- Release: 13 May 2007 – 3 June 2008

Hepsi 1 is a Turkish television show, broadcasting on the national network ATV. The show began in 2007. It stars the members of the Turkish pop singing group Hepsi.

== Plot ==
The premise of the show revolves around the four main characters, four girls who all go to a performing arts academy and live together: Cemre, Eren, Gülçin and Yasemin. They face tragic and comic events each week. They also have a hard debt to pay off, due to Yasemin crashing her boyfriend Korkut’s car. Overnight, they find themselves in the spotlight performing at a club, now risking their places at their school due to the headmaster, Mr. Erol not allowing his students to become famous whilst in education. The girls struggle to hide the secret from Mr. Erol, who eventually finds out because of a newspaper reporter; impressed with the girls' performance, came looking for them. Once the girls are found out, they insist they won’t do it again. The reporter then creates a competition, the winner being able to make an album, as the reporter believes that the students at the academy are very talented. Of course, the girls win and are signed to an album deal however the girls are yet to release the album.

Along with the fame side of the show, the girls also deal with their love life. Each girl having a match: Cemre – Emre, Eren – Bariş, Gülçin – Mert and Yasemin – Korkut.

== Cast ==
These are the cast members who star in Hepsi 1;

- Cemre Kemer (Cemre)
- Eren Bakıcı (Eren)
- Gülçin Ergül (Gülçin)
- Yasemin Yürük (Yasemin)
- Cem Avnayim (Emre)
- Bahadır Efe (Bahadır)
- Kubilay Penbeklioğlu (Mr.Erol)
- Sezen Ünal (Alev)
- Erman Burmalı (Barış)
- Yusuf Akgün (Korkut)
- Oğuzhan Yıldız (Mert)
- Belma Canciğer
- Jennifer Boyner (Zeynep)

== Ratings ==
Season	Time Slot	Year	View in Millions
1	Sundays 8.00pm (Show TV)	2007	2.7
2	Saturday 10.00pm (ATV) Tuesday 8.00 pm (ATV)	2007–2008	2.1

Hepsi 1's first episode aired on 13 May 2007 on Show TV and after airing for 5 months, moved to ATV as of 28 October 2007, airing the show at 20:00 every Sunday the same time and on the same day as when on Show TV. The show then moved to Saturdays for a few months and as of 1 April 2008 the show airs on Tuesdays. However, on 3 June 2008 came the last episode of the hit series Hepsi 1. It is not yet known whether or nor the series will go on, one of the group members Eren stated in one of the concerts that if they are to continue the series they will not be able to carry on promoting their new album such as having concerts but if they stop the series then they would be able to go on with their music career.
