= Aşk Sakızı =

Single by Hepsi

from the album Hepsi 2
- Released: 2006
- Recorded: 2006–07
- Genre: Pop

Hepsi singles chronology
"Kalpsizsin" (2006)	"Aşk Sakızı" (2006)	"Sen Bir Tanesin" (2008)

"Aşk Sakızı" is a pop song by Hepsi. It is the second single released from their second studio album, Hepsi 2 (2007) and the seventh single released with a music video. Yet again due to the album-oriented nature of the Turkish music industry this single was not physically or digitally released, but only released through airplay and through receiving play on music channels.

== History ==
According to Hepsi there were 4 possible singles to be chosen, Aşk Sakızı being one and the others being "Mum", "іki Kelime" and "Saklanbaç". "Aşk Sakızı" was chosen as the second single from the album as it won the majority of the vote by the girls.

== Music video ==
The music video features the girls in trendy clothes singing to the camera and dancing in front of a coloured background, recorded by a blue screen as stated in the Turkish equivalent to Making the Video on channel PowerTürk. It also featured scenes of the group singing in front of two yellow motorbikes and features the group performing a dance in belly dancer's outfits.
