= Üç Kalp =

Single by Hepsi

from the album Bir
- Released: 2005
- Recorded: 2005
- Genre: Pop
- Length: 3:51
- Label: Stardium labels
- Songwriter: Ferdi Ebcioğlu
- Producer: Temel Zümrüt

Hepsi singles chronology
"Yalan" (2005)	"Üç Kalp" (2005)	"Herşeye Rağmen" (2005)

"Üç Kalp" is a pop song from Turkish girl group Hepsi's debut album, Bir, released in 2005.

== Background ==
This is an old song of a well-known Turkish singer: Ajda Pekkan.

== Music video ==
The music video is a simple video made of two scenes, one being set in a dark room and the other being set in water, this gives an aqua feel to the video. This is the first music video not to contain any choreographed dancing by the girls.
