= Olmaz Oğlan =

Single by Hepsi

from the album Bir
- Released: 2005
- Recorded: 2004–2005
- Genre: Pop, R&B
- Songwriter(s): Mete Özgencil
- Producer(s): Temel Zümrüt

Hepsi singles chronology
"Olmaz Oğlan" (2005)	"Yalan" (2005)

"Olmaz Oğlan" is a pop/R&B song for the Turkish girl group Hepsi's debut album, Bir (2005).

The song was nt released physically or digitally as a single, however it received airplay and was the music video was played on Turkish music channels. The song was not as popular as the group's second single; Yalan.

== Music video ==
The music video sees the girls in several dresses singing and dancing for the cameras. They are then seen walking ponies and seen dancing on a platform in trendy cloths whilst group member Eren raps.

== Bad Penny ==
"Bad Penny"

Single by Hepsi
- Released: 2005
- Recorded: 2004–2005
- Genre: Pop, R&B
- Songwriter(s): Mete Özgencil
- Producer(s): Temel Zümrüt

Hepsi singles chronology
"Bad Penny" (2005)	"Yalan" (2005)

"Bad Penny" is the first English song to be recorded by Group Hepsi. The beat of the song is the same as "Olmaz Oğlan", however the lyrics differ from the Turkish version.

== Music video ==
The music video is the same as Olmaz Oğlan however the singing scenes were re-recorded.

== Chart ==
In Germany, their debut English-language single Bad Penny received very good airplay in Germany and played on MTV for a few weeks.
