= Maximum (Murat Boz album) =

Studio album by Murat Boz
- Released: 25 January 2007
- Recorded: 2006
- Genre: Crunk
- Length: 51:21
- Label: Stardium

Murat Boz chronology
Maximum (2007)	Uçurum (2008)

Singles from Maximum
- 1. "Aşkı Bulamam Ben" Released: 21 July 2006; 2. "Maximum" Released: 10 February 2007; 3. "Püf" Released: 12 June 2007

Maximum is the first studio album by Turkish pop singer Murat Boz. The album has only one officially released single, "Aşkı Bulamam Ben". However, music videos for the songs "Maximum" and "Püf" have been made but have not been released as physical singles.

== Singles ==
- "Aşkı Bulamam Ben" is the lead single from the album. It was released in Turkey on July 21, 2006.
- "Maximum" was released as a radio/video only single on February 10, 2007.
- "Püf" was also released as a radio/video only single on June 12, 2007.

== Track listing ==
No.	Title	Writer(s)	English	Length
1.	"Maximum"	Murat Mathew Erdem	Maximum	3:50
2.	"Aşkı Bulamam Ben" (Ozinga Remix)	Nil Karaibrahimgil	I Can't Find Love	3:46
3.	"Püf"	Tarkan Tevetoğlu	-	3:51
4.	"Üzüleceksin"	Mehmet Ata Polat	You Will be Upset	3:46
5.	"Dönmem"	Devrim Karaoğlu	I Won't Return	4:01
6.	"Anla Artık"	Serkan Dinçer	Understand It Now	4:12
7.	"Derdin Var"	Tufan Bayraktar, Murat Boz	You Have Sorrow	3:20
8.	"Seni Bana Bağlayan"	Ümit Sayın	What Unites You And Me	4:04
9.	"Kalbini Dinle"	Serkan Dinçer, Jilber Yeşilbagciyan	Listen To Your Heart	3:49
10.	"Beni Bana Bırak"	Murat Mathew Erdem	Leave Me To Myself	4:01
11.	"Maximum" (Matthew Version)	Murat Mathew Erdem	Maximum	3:39
12.	"Seni Bana Bağlayan" (Acoustic)	Ümit Sayın	What Unites You And Me	3:16
13.	"Aşkı Bulamam Ben"	Nil Karaibrahimgil	I Can't Find Love	3:48
14.	"Umrumda Değilsin"	Tufan Bayraktar, Ozan Çolakoğlu, Serkan Dinçer	You Don't Impress Me	4:38

== Release history ==
Region	Date	Label
Turkey	25 January 2007	Stardium
