= Sen Bir Tanesin =

Single by Hepsi

from the album Saka
- Released: 2008
- Recorded: 2007
- Genre: Pop/Rock,

Hepsi singles chronology
"Aşk Sakızı" (2007)	"Sen Bir Tanesin" (2008)	"4 Peynirli Pizza" (2008)

"Sen Bir Tanesin" is the ninth single by Hepsi. However it is the group's first song to differ from their previous released as this is the first pop rock song to be released by the group.

== History ==
The song was recorded for the Turkish version of the Winx Club Movie soundtrack. It was the first time the group had recorded a song in the genre of rock and wasn't the typical R&B/Pop song the group are used to. "Sen Bir Tanesin" was recorded with another song for the soundtrack called "Sadece bir kiz", however this song is more typical of the group as it is a ballad.

== Music video ==
The music video sees the girls in rocky clothes performing at a car garage. Scenes of the Winx Club Movie cut in between the performance. This is the second music video not to contain any choreographed dancing by the girls.
