= Hepsi 2 =

2006 studio album by Hepsi

Studio album by Hepsi
- Released: June 2006 (Turkey)
- Recorded: 2006–2007
- Genres: R&B-pop, dance-pop
- Producer: Süleyman Yüksel (co-produced by Hepsi)

Hepsi chronology
Bir (2005)	Hepsi 2 (2006)	Tempo (2006)

Singles from Hepsi 2
- 1. "Kalpsizsin" Released: 2007; 2. "Aşk Sakızı" Released: 2007

Hepsi 2 is the second album of the Turkish girl band Hepsi. The album was released in June 2006. They have shot two music videos from this album, which are Kalpsizsin and Aşk Sakızı.

== Track listing ==
#	Title	Track Duration	Translations
1.	"Olmaz Böyle Şey"	3:33	(This is impossible)
2.	"Mum"	3:35	(Candle)
3.	"Kalpsizsin"	3:25	(You're Heartless)
4.	"Tik Tak"	3:22	(Tick Tock)
5.	"Hanimiş"	3:39	(Where is it)
6.	"Kolay Mı Sevmek"	2:54	(Is it easy to love)
7.	"İki Kelime"	3:39	(Two words)
8.	"Bakalım"	03:35	(Let's look)
9.	"Aşk Sakızı"	3:31	(Love gum)
10.	"Kafanı Takma"	3:17	(Don't Care)
11.	"Saklambaç"	3:17	(Hide and Seek)
12.	"Dinlemem"	3:11	(I won't listen)
13.	"Uzat Elini"	4:00	(Give your hand)
