= Bir (Hepsi album) =

Studio album by Hepsi
- Released: 2005
- Recorded: 2004–2005
- Genres: R&B; pop; dance-pop
- Length: 47:35
- Language: Turkish
- Label: Stardium

Hepsi chronology
Bir (2005)	Hepsi 2 (2006)

Singles from Bir
- 1. "Olmaz Oğlan" Released: April 2005; 2. "Yalan" Released: 2005; 3. "Herşeye Rağmen" Released: May 2005; 4. "Üç Kalp" Released: June 2005

Bir ("one" in Turkish), is an album released by Turkish girl group Hepsi in April 2005. To date, the album has sold over 149,000 copies. It is ranked number 19 among the best-selling albums of 2005 in Turkey. Music videos have been produced for their debut single "Olmaz Oğlan", "Yalan", "Herşeye Rağmen" and "Üç Kalp".

== Track listing ==
#	Song	Time	Lyrics	Music	Arrangement
1.	"Olmaz Oğlan"	3:44	Mete Özgencil	Mete Özgencil	Temel Zümrüt
2.	"Nedenini Sorma"	3:41	Süleyman Yüksel	Süleyman Yüksel	Temel Zümrüt
3.	"Yalan"	3:40	Süleyman Yüksel	Süleyman Yüksel	Temel Zümrüt
4.	"Olta"	2:58	Mete Özgencil	Mete Özgencil	Devrim Kocaoğlu
5.	"Dur Dur"	3:34	Yusuf Emrah Uzunca Şebnem Özberk	Paul Rein / Moh Denebi Published By Air Chyrsalis Scandinavia AB / Kojam Music	Ozan Doğulu
6.	"Üç Kalp"	3:51	Fecri Ebcioğlu	Bilinmiyor	Temel Zümrüt
7.	"Özgür Değilim"	2:18	Mete Özgencil	Mete Özgencil	Devrim Kocaoğlu
8.	"Herşeye Rağmen"	4:00	Süleyman Yüksel	Süleyman Yüksel	Temel Zümrüt
9.	"Gitme"	4:10	Süleyman Yüksel	Süleyman Yüksel	Temel Zümrüt
10.	"Gecelerce"	3:50	Süleyman Yüksel	Süleyman Yüksel	Temel Zümrüt
11.	"Olmaz Oğlan" (Remix)	3:58	Mete Özgencil	Mete Özgencil	Serkan Dinçer
12.	"Dün Tattın"	4:02	Mete Özgencil	Mete Özgencil	Ozan Doğulu
13.	"Çok Güzelsin"	3:49	Mete Özgencil	Mete Özgencil	Temel Zümrüt
