= Stardium =

Turkish record label

Stardium Labels
- Founded: 15 June 2002
- Genre: R&B, Pop, Dance
- Country of origin: Turkey
- Official website: http://stardium.com.tr

Stardium is a Turkish record label, founded on June 15, 2002. The artists from Stardium include the popular Group Hepsi and Murat Boz. The label has gained other success other than the music released, as three of the artists have their own television program, Group Hepsi's show Hepsi 1 on ATV, Murat Boz's show on Star TV and Ayça Tekindor on Kral TV.

== Roster ==
- Ayça Tekindor
- Gökhan Keser
- Hepsi
- Murat Boz
- Özgür Çevik
- Redd (album "50/50")
- Zerrin Özer
- Nükhet Duru
