= Hepsi =

Turkish girl group

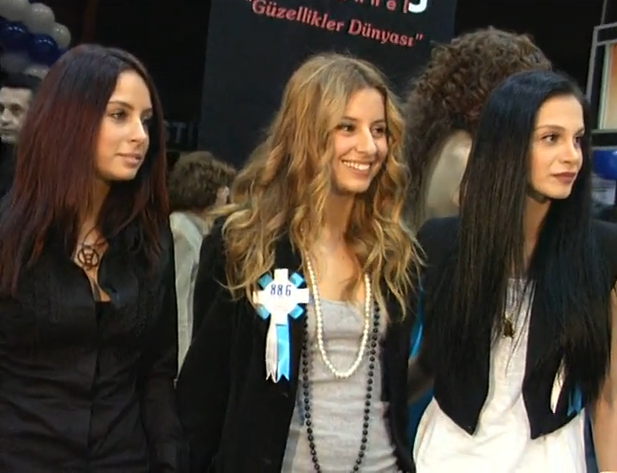
- Left to right: Yasemin, Eren, Cemre

Background information
- Origin: Turkey
- Genres: R&B; pop
- Years active: 2005–2015
- Label: Stardium Labels
- Past members: Cemre Kemer; Yasemin Yürük; Eren Bakıcı; Gülçin Ergül

Hepsi was a Turkish girl group. They consisted of Eren Bakıcı, Cemre Kemer and Yasemin Yürük, and formerly of Gülçin Ergül, who left in 2009. Cemre Kemer's mother, Şebnem Özberk, managed the group. All four members were students at the same conservatory as children, where Özberk began to build the group. All the members of the group are ballet dancers.

The group was largely followed in Turkey, with their audience being made up mainly of teenage boys and girls and pre-teen girls. The group also starred in their own youth series, called Hepsi 1 on one of the main channels, ATV Turkey.

== Bir ==
The group rose to fame in the year 2005 with their debut album Bir, which spawned the hit songs "Olmaz Oğlan", "Üç Kalp", and "Herşeye Rağmen", and the hugely successful song "Yalan".

== Hepsi 2 ==
In June 2006, the group released their second studio Hepsi 2. The first single from the album, "Kalpsizsin", in 2006, also became a huge hit, winning them an award at the Kral TV Music Awards for the best group. The second single was "Aşk Sakızı" in 2007 which also became a huge hit.

== Tempo ==
They went on to release their first official EP, Tempo, in association with Pepsi, and worked with Turkish Pop legend Sezen Aksu, famous for working with Tarkan.

== Şaka (10+1) ==
The group released their third studio album on 24 May 2008. The group stated that the third album was gonna be "different", On 3 May 2008, the album title was confirmed to be Şaka (10+1).

The album's name includes "(10+1)", because the ten songs featured on the album are covers of famous songs Hepsi have re-produced for their unique style. Some of the featured songs are from very famous singers in Turkey such as Ajda Pekkan and Sezen Aksu, however there is only one brand new song in this album which is "4 Peynirli Pizza", written by Kenan Dogulu. "4 Peynirli Pizza" is the first single for this album and was released on 23 May 2008.

== Geri Dönüşüm ==
After Gülçin Ergül left, they released the album "Geri Dönüşüm" in 2010.

== Hepsi 1 ==
Hepsi 1 was a Turkish soap which aired once a week on ATV, originally on Show TV. The soap shows the girls as pre-famous and how they became famous. The characters of themselves are over the top, however the show has some truth about the girls, such as their likes and dislikes.

Season one attracted many views with an average of 3.2 million viewers a week. Season two had an average of 2.5 million to 6 million viewers a week.

The last episode of the season 2 has aired on 3 June 2008. Although it was said by ATV that season 2 was going to be the last season, it has been confirmed by ATV that a season 3 for Hepsi1 will be made. It did seem quite a hard decision to be made by ATV because of the number of viewers changing every week from approximately 6 million viewers per week to 2.5 million viewers. However, because of a high number of requests to ATV and the number of viewers being quite high, ATV has confirmed that there will be a Season 3 made. Although it was confirmed it may have a long delay because of the group's promotion of their new album and also the recording of their movie.

== Products and endorsements ==
=== Pepsi sponsorship ===
In summer 2006 they starred in the Turkish Pepsi commercials, advertising the Pepsi Power Club music download site (the first legal music download site in Turkey). There are two adverts, one of which shows what Hepsi were like as they were growing up, starting from when they were children.

=== Penti sponsorship ===
They starred in commercial "Penti".

=== Winx Club ===
Alongside Ebru Yazici, they sung in the Turkish dub of Winx Club, in the movies and the Winx in Concert album.

=== Stationery ===
The group have released their own stationery and school equipment line. This contains 160 different types of stationery equipment, varying from books, pens, pencils, art books, diaries etc. This stationery line was released in two parts; the first part of the stationery equipment being released in the beginning of July, these were the books, and the rest of the equipment, pens and pencils were released in the first weeks of September 2008.

2008–2009: Group hiatus

in 2009 the group decided to go on their musical way. So they are now only three group members (Cemre Kemer, Yasemin Yürük and Eren Bakıcı).

2012–present: Second group hiatus

In July 2015, the band announced that they would release a new single in the winter, but it was later cancelled and the group announced their disbandment.

== Discography ==
=== Albums ===
- 2005: Bir
- 2006: Hepsi 2
- 2008: Şaka (10+1)
- 2010: Geri Dönüşüm

=== EP ===
- 2006: Tempo

=== Non-album singles ===
- 2008: "Sen Bir Tanesin" (Winx Club Soundtrack)
- 2008: "Sadece Bir Kız" (Winx Club Soundtrack)
- 2010: "Harikalar Diyarı" (Winx Club Soundtrack)
- 2011: "Fındık Kadar"
- 2013: "Sarmaş Dolaş"

=== Featured ===
- 2011: "Organik" – Nükhet Duru ft Hepsi
- 2011: "Şık Şık" – Murat Dalkılıç ft. Volga Tamöz & Hepsi

=== Others ===
- 2007: "Jenerik" (Soundtrack of series Hepsi 1)
- 2009: "Winx Club Konserde" (Turkish dub of Winx Club in Concert)
- 2010: "Winx Club Sihirli Macera" (Turkish soundtrack of Winx Club: Magical Adventure)

== Awards ==
- 2010: – Pal Fm-Band of the Year-"Won"
- 2009: – Kral TV Video Music Awards - Band of the Year - Nominated
- 2008: – Will foundation special Atanur Oğuz Schools Soap of the Year - "Won"
- 2008: – 11. Istanbul Fm Music Awards - Band of the Year - "Won"
- 2008: – PowerTurk Music Award 2008 - Band of the Year - Nominated
- 2008: – Kral TV Video Music Awards - Band of the Year - "Won"
- 2007: – Power Turk Music Awards 2007 - Band of the Year - "Won"
- 2007: – Kral TV Video Music Awards - Band of the year - "Won"
- 2007: – Jetix Awards-Band of the Year -"Won"
- 2006: – Kral TV Video Music Awards - Band of the Year - "Won"
- 2006: – Jetix Awards-Band of the Year -"Won"

== Tours ==
- 2008: Hepsi Şaka
- 2007: GNCTRKCLL 40 Partileri Tour
- 2007: Maxland 2007
- 2006: Maxland 2006
- 2006: Sezen Aksu&Hepsi (Pepsi)
- 2005: Hepsi Bir

Turkish Republic of Northern Cyprus Concerts

- 1 June 2007 - Famagusta / Namık Kemal District
  - Production Company: Stardium
  - Executive Producer: Ahu Özışık
  - Producer: Ceyhan Çandır
  - Recording Studio: İmaj Stüdyoları
  - Recording Engineer: Murat Elgün
  - Mixing Engineer: Marek Pompetzki
  - Mastering Engineer: Stefan
  - Graphic Design: Stardium
  - Photographer: Ayten Alpün
  - Styling: Kemal Doğulu
