= Soner Sarıkabadayı =

Turkish singer and songwriter

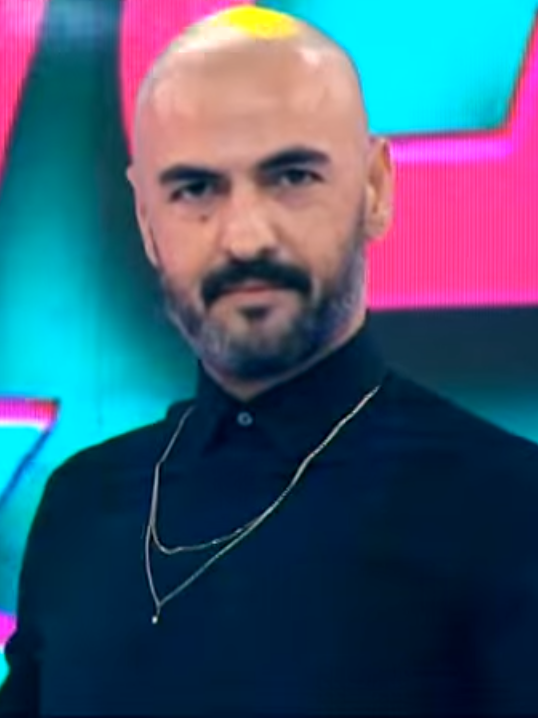
- Sarıkabadayı in 2016

Background information
- Born: 8 December 1978 (age 47); Pazarcık, Kahramanmaraş, Turkey
- Genres: Turkish pop
- Occupation: Singer-songwriter
- Years active: 2009–present
- Website: sonersarikabadayi.com

Soner Sarıkabadayı (born 8 December 1978) is a Turkish pop music singer and songwriter.

== Early life ==
Soner Sarıkabadayı was born on 8 December 1978 in the Kahramanmaraş Province. Güngör is his mother and Hassan is his father. He has two siblings named Perihan and Zafer. Soner Sarıkabadayı lived with his family until the age of 4 in Kahramanmaraş, then moved to Mersin. He completed elementary, middle school and high school education in Mersin.

== Discography ==
=== Albums ===
- Kara (2001)
- Trio (2012)

=== EPs ===
- Pas (2010)
- Sadem (2010)
- İtiraz (2011)
- O Konu (feat. Röya Ayxan) (2017)
- Akustikler 1 (2019)

=== Singles ===
- "Buz" (2009)
- "Seveni Arıyorum" (2011)
- "Tuzlu Su" (2011)
- "Tuzlu Su Akustik" (2011)
- "İnsan Sevmez Mi?" (2012)
- "Kutsal Toprak" (2013)
- "Yara Bandı" (2014)
- "Unuttun Mu Beni" (feat. Ozan Çolakoğlu) (2015)
- "Taş" (2016)
- "Bitanem Deme Bitanem" (2016)
- "Tekamül" (2017)
- "Gel De Uyu" (2017)
- "Boza Boza" (2018)
- "Tarifi Zor" (2018)
- "Nerede Kalmıştık?" (2019)
- "Ölümüne" (2020)
- "Delalım" (2020)
- "Kolay Olmayacak" (2020)
- "Bi Sen Gibisi" (2020)
- "Rahat Rahat" (2020)
- "Tamamlayamayabiliyorum" (2021)
- "Pir" (2022)
- "Tarifi Zor (Bağlama Version)" (2022)
- "Kendileri" (2022)
- "Seviyo Muyuz?" (2023)
- "Dudaklarım Yeminli" (2023)
- "Neresi?" (2024)
- "Yangın Yangın" (2024)
- "Mevzu Derin" (2024)
- "Koparılan Çiçekler" (2024)
- "Dönemem Ona" (2025)
- "Bence de Git" (feat. Aerro İle) (2025)
