= Ölürüm Sana (album) =

Studio album by Tarkan
- Released: 15 July 1997
- Recorded: November 1995 – April 1997
- Studio: Erekli Tunç, Istanbul Plak, Platinum Island and Imaj Studios (Istanbul, Turkey)
- Genre: Pop
- Length: 48:06
- Label: İstanbul Plak
- Producer: Mehmet Söğütoğlu

Tarkan chronology
Aacayipsin (1994)	Ölürüm Sana (1997)	Tarkan (1999)

Ölürüm Sana (I'd Die for You) is Turkish singer Tarkan's third studio album, released on 15 July 1997. It was released by İstanbul Plak. He announced the start of work on the album in late 1995. He began work on it at İmaj Studios in November 1995. Recording took a year and a half, and he collaborated with numerous musicians on the album, which was completed in April 1997. As with his album Aacayipsin (1994), the lead single was written by Sezen Aksu. Tarkan, who co-wrote "İkimizin Yerine" with Sezen Aksu, also wrote the lyrics for seven of the album's tracks. The album, which features works by artists such as Turgut Berkes and Pakize Barışta, was produced by Mehmet Söğütoğlu. Ozan Çolakoğlu arranged and directed the album, which was also released in Europe and Asia. It sold over 3 million copies in Turkey and achieved great success worldwide, selling over 4.5 million copies.

The 11-track album featured Tarkan, unlike his previous albums, incorporating elements of synthpop and house music. Five of the tracks were released together with music videos. All the tracks from the album topped the charts, and critics also responded positively. With the global debut of "Şımarık", Tarkan achieved global fame. Following the album's release, he promoted the album's tracks with a series of concerts in Turkey and abroad. Tarkan, who had changed his style and image compared to his first two albums, created a distinct style for each of the tracks released from this album, unlike his previous music videos. The album received nearly a million orders on its release day. One of the most successful albums of the 1990s, the album also became one of the best-selling albums in Turkish pop music history.

== Background ==
Tarkan released his first album, Yine Sensiz, under the İstanbul Plak label on 26 December 1992. He achieved a strong debut with his single "Kıl Oldum", as well as tracks like "Kimdi?" and "Vazgeçemem". He gained national recognition through his concerts and radio and television appearances. On 17 May 1994, he released his second album, Aacayipsin, which featured a large ensemble. Unlike his first album, this album achieved a major breakthrough with the lead single, "Hepsi Senin mi?", with lyrics by Sezen Aksu. Tarkan transformed his style and image with this album, reaching number one on the charts with the singles "Unutmamalı", "Gül Döktüm Yollarına", "Kış Güneşi", and "Dön Bebeğim". While his first album was released only in Turkey, his second album was also released in European and Asian countries. With the album, Tarkan performed in stadium concerts across Turkey and around the world. He won the Best Pop Male and Best of '94 awards at the Kral TV Video Music Awards, becoming the most successful pop music artist of the year. In November 1995, he began work on his third solo album at İmaj Studios, while continuing to give concerts. On 23 February 1998, at the 4th Kral TV Video Music Awards, Tarkan won the Best Pop Music Male Artist award. He also received the award for the best-selling album of the year.

On 22 May 1998, his duet with Müzeyyen Senar on the song "Benzemez Kimse Sana" from her album Müzeyyen Senar ile Bir Ömre Bedel was released. The album, which received great acclaim, featured artists such as Sezen Aksu, Şebnem Ferah, Ajda Pekkan, Fatih Erkoç, Levent Yüksel, Kubat, Feraye, Nilüfer, and Nükhet Duru. Due to the constant news about his military service in the media at that time, he joined the military in 2000 as part of paid military service. Before his military service, he performed at a charity concert for the earthquake victims of the 1999 İzmit earthquake.

== Release and promotion ==
He sang Turkish classical music in a special program broadcast on Kanal D on 22 February 1996. In August 1996, he met Atlantic Records owner Ahmet Ertegün by chance. He announced his plans to release an English-language album. Tarkan, who announced that he would include a moving song from Sezen Aksu in his third album, just as he had done with his second album, stated that the cost of his album Ölürüm Sana was ₺10 billion. In March 1997, he gave concerts with Sezen Aksu in Istanbul, Ankara, and Berlin. The concert, which attracted considerable attention, featured the duo performing their own songs and performing duets on many others. Footage from the concert was broadcast in three parts on ATV. On 15 July 1997, he released his third album, Ölürüm Sana. The album, which cost ₺45 billion, was printed in one million copies. The music video for the album's lead single, "Şımarık", was shot in London. The album broke a record by receiving one million orders on the day it was released.

Beginning in late July, he began performing at concerts in various stadiums across Turkey. In addition to his album, he also voiced the title character in Walt Disney Pictures' animated film Hercules, released in Turkish in January 1998. In addition to dubbing, he also sang the songs featured in the film. In October 1997, he shot the music video for his song "İkimizin Yerine" on the shores of Lake Küçükçekmece. A special wooden house was built for the video, directed by Mete Özgencil. The video, produced by a crew of 60 people, took three days to film. The video, which cost $70,000, was released on 3 November 1997. He went on a European tour in December 1997. He gave seventeen concerts in different cities across the UK, Belgium, Germany, the Netherlands, Australia, Sweden and France. He was late for his first concert in England due to nearly an hour and a half of questioning by British police at customs. When only 200 people were left in the 1,800-seat hall due to the delay, Tarkan canceled the concert. In January 1998, a production company offered Tarkan ₺4 trillion for a 26-episode romantic comedy television series. However, Tarkan declined the offer. He released the music video for his song "Salına Salına Sinsice" on 8 March 1998. Directed by Metin Arolat, the video featured space decorations specially made for Tarkan, whose hairstyle and clothing reflected the fashion of the late 1990s. Tarkan was joined in the video by Miss Bulgaria 1995, Evgenia Kalkandjieva. On 12 July 1998, he released the music video for "Ölürüm Sana", which gave his album its title. He shot the video in New York with the sponsorship of Loft. On 10 January 1999, he released the music video for his song "Kır Zincirlerini". He also released the track as a single with different versions titled "Bu Gece".

=== Tarkan album and entry into global charts ===
Released worldwide on 21 August 1998, by İstanbul Plak and PolyGram, his album Tarkan featured tracks from Ölürüm Sana and remixed versions. The album also included "Dön Bebeğim", "Gül Döktüm Yollarına", and "Şıkıdım", a new version of "Hepsi Senin mi?", all from Aacayipsin (1994). Initially released in Europe, followed by Asia, Japan, Australia, North America, and South America, the album surpassed many global stars such as Gloria Estefan, Mariah Carey, Madonna and Janet Jackson in sales. In the same period, Tarkan released his song "Şımarık" as a single and shot a music video for the song in France, directed by Emmanuel Saada.

Tarkan, who achieved very high sales figures with the release of the clip, was a guest on many television programs abroad. He received the Best Selling Turkish Artist award at the World Music Awards ceremony held on 5 May 1999, becoming the first Turkish artist to win this award. He also performed the song "Şımarık" on stage before receiving his award.

== Track listing ==
No.	Title	Writer(s)	Composer(s)	Length
1.	"Şımarık"	Sezen Aksu	Sezen Aksu, Tarkan	3:54
2.	"İkimizin Yerine"	Sezen Aksu, Tarkan	Sezen Aksu, Tarkan	4:42
3.	"Ölürüm Sana"	Tarkan	Tarkan	4:05
4.	"Salına Salına Sinsice"	Tarkan	Tarkan	3:55
5.	"Gecenin Ürkek Kanatlarında"	Turgut Berkes	Ozan Çolakoğlu, Turgut Berkes, Tarkan	3:49
6.	"Kır Zincirlerini"	Tarkan	Tarkan	5:22
7.	"İnci Tanem"	Tarkan	Tarkan	5:38
8.	"Başına Bela Olurum"	Tarkan	Tarkan	4:11
9.	"Unut Beni"	Tarkan	Tarkan	5:27
10.	"Delikanlı Çağlarım"	Tarkan	Anonim	3:42
11.	"Beni Anlama"	Pakize Barışta	Ozan Çolakoğlu	5:21

== Personnel ==
- Tarkan - Vocals all tracks, supervisor
- Production - İstanbul Plak
- Producer - Mehmet Söğütoğlu
- Music director, keyboards and rhythm composition - Ozan Çolakoğlu
- Production manager - Özgür Buldum, Uygar Ataş and Egemen Öncel
- Editing - Özgür Buldum, Çağlar Serhan Keser, Duyal Karagözoğlu
- Mastering - Çağlar Türkmen
- Mixing - Rıza Erekli, Brian Kinkead ve Ozan Çolakoğlu
- Tonmeister - Arzu Alsan, Denise Barbarita, Murat Matthew Erdem, Serkan Kula, Shawn Coffey, Steve Sauder and Ufuk Çoban
- Daf - Sedat Güvenir, Seyfi Ata
- Darbuka - Cengiz Ercümer, Celal Bağlan
- Guitar - Erdem Sökmen, David Matos
- Stringed instruments - Mustafa Süder, Mustafa Süder Grubu, Şenyaylar Yaylı Grubu and İstanbul Senfonik Yaylı Grubu
- Bass guitar - Murat Ejder, İsmail Soyberk and James Cruz
- Clarinet - Bülent Altınbaş
- Davul - Hamdi Akatay
- Electric guitar - Can Şengün, David Matos
- Percussion - Aydın Karabulut
- Acoustic guitar - Erdem Sökmen, Can Şengün
- Kemenche - Ahmet Kadri Rizeli
- Bass davul - Shawn Pelton
- Oud - İlyas Tetik, Hüseyin Bitmez
- Bendir - Seyfi Ata
- Bangos - Seyfi Ata
- Castanets - Seyfi Ata
- Hollow - Seyfi Ata
- Qanun - Tamer Pınarbaşı
- French horn - Ertuğrul Köseoğlu
- Piano - Ozan Çolakoğlu
- Orchestra chief - Ozan Çolakoğlu, Nail Yavuzoğlu
- Back vocals - Levent Yüksel, Aycan Dağıstanlı, Elif Ersoy, Can Erkencigil, Nazire Yağız, Nalan, Sabri Tüfekçi, Seda Tüfekçi, Turgut Berkes

== Awards ==
Year	Award	Category	Result
1997	25th Golden Butterfly Awards	Best Male Turkish Pop Music Artist	Won
1998	4th Kral TV Video Music Awards	Best Male Pop Artist	Won
1998	4th Kral TV Video Music Awards	Best-selling Album	Won
1999	France, Midem	Best-selling pop single album (Şımarık)	Won
1999	World Music Awards	Best-selling Turkish Artist	Won
2000	Germany, ECHO Music Prize	International Newcomer of the Year	Nominated
