= Şımarık =

1997 single by Tarkan

Single by Tarkan

from the album Tarkan and Ölürüm Sana
- Released: 1997
- Length: 3:10 ("Şımarık" radio edit only); 3:57 (original version)
- Label: İstanbul Plak; PolyGram; Universal
- Songwriters: Sezen Aksu; Tarkan
- Producers: Mehmet Söğütoğlu; Dieter Rubach

Tarkan singles chronology
"Salına Salına Sinsice" (1998)	"Şımarık" (1997)	"Şıkıdım" (1999)

"Şımarık" (pronounced [ʃɯmaˈɾɯk], "Spoiled"), also known as "Kiss Kiss", is a song by Turkish singer Tarkan. It was written by Sezen Aksu, with music credited as composed by Tarkan. However, Tarkan later admitted in a 2006 interview that this had been done without Aksu's consent, who was the true copyright owner. It formed part of Tarkan's third album, Ölürüm Sana (1997). "Şımarık" was released in France in 1998 and across the rest of the world in 1999 from the compilation album Tarkan, which was released in Europe.

"Şımarık" became a chart hit in Europe, reaching No. 1 in Wallonia and entering the top three in France, the Netherlands, Norway, Sweden and Switzerland. Many versions of the song were recorded in different languages, most notably the English-language cover, titled "Kiss Kiss", by Greek-American singer Stella Soleil in 2001, which was itself covered by Australian actress Holly Valance in 2002.

== The song ==
As Tarkan's first major single, the song is generally considered his debut single. He had released three albums before this, but never released a song in single format due to the album-orientated nature of the Turkish music industry. The song has also appeared in soundtracks of various movies, including French film Beau travail and the American film XX/XY. It is generally considered Tarkan's signature song in Europe. Its chorus ends with two characteristic kiss sounds.

== Commercial performance ==
When the single was released in Europe, it reached No. 1 in Wallonia, No. 2 in Norway, plus No. 3 in Switzerland, France and the Netherlands. Sales went gold in Europe, where Tarkan was presented with his gold disc at Cannes Midem and in Germany by Universal.

== Music video ==
The accompanying music video for "Şımarık" is directed by Emmanuel Saada and shot in Marseille, France, in a neighborhood called "Le panier", with narrow streets and cobbled roads. Here, Tarkan sings and jaywalks. Several women on the streets see him and start chasing him to try to kiss him, but he tries to avoid them by first changing direction and then later by walking faster. More and more women begin to chase him as the song proceeds, but Tarkan eventually starts running in order to avoid them. A big group of women then run after him and as the song finishes, Tarkan takes cover in a street corner. A young girl is there as well and Tarkan kisses her forehead. The video was the first that Saada directed.

== Track listings ==
- Şımarık, 1999
1. Şımarık Malagutti (4:46)
2. Şımarık Malagutti edit remix (3:17)
3. Şımarık Malagutti extended remix (7:00)
4. Şımarık Ned Divine edit remix (3:13)
5. Şımarık Ned Divine extended remix (5:56)
6. Şımarık radio edit (3:12)
7. Şımarık long (original) version (3:55)
8. Şımarık Orıental (4:05)
9. Şımarık Zıo dub extended remix (6:11)
10. Şımarık Zıo dub edit remix
11. Şımarık Şınan soulful (6:14)
12. Şımarık Şınan dub

Track lists to this CD single change depending on the country of release. There were four promotional LP versions released. A promotional CD single was released in France, with an orange cover. This was the first ever release and included one track. This is now a collector's item. There was also a limited edition (fan-edition) single released in Germany, which came with a poster of Tarkan.

== Charts ==
=== Weekly charts ===
Chart (1998–1999)	Peak position
Austria (Ö3 Austria Top 40)	14
Belgium (Ultratop 50 Flanders)	5
Belgium (Ultratop 50 Wallonia)	1
Europe (Eurochart Hot 100)	10
France (SNEP)	3
Germany (GfK)	6
Netherlands (Dutch Top 40)	3
Netherlands (Single Top 100)	3
Norway (VG-lista)	2
Sweden (Sverigetopplistan)	3
Switzerland (Schweizer Hitparade)	3

=== Year-end charts ===
Chart (1998)	Position
Belgium (Ultratop 50 Flanders)	33
Belgium (Ultratop 50 Wallonia)	5
Europe (Eurochart Hot 100)	75
France (SNEP)	20

Chart (1999)	Position
Europe (Eurochart Hot 100)	47
Europe Border Breakers (Music & Media)	46
Germany (Media Control)	26
Netherlands (Dutch Top 40)	14
Netherlands (Single Top 100)	18
Sweden (Hitlistan)	24
Switzerland (Schweizer Hitparade)	17

Chart (2000)	Position
Brazil (Crowley)	49

== Certifications and sales ==
Region	Certification	Certified units/sales
Belgium (BRMA)	2× Platinum	100,000^{*}
France (SNEP)	Gold	300,000
Germany (BVMI)	Gold	250,000^{^}
Netherlands (NVPI)	Gold	50,000^{^}
Norway (IFPI Norway)	Gold	
Sweden (GLF)	Platinum	30,000^{^}
Switzerland (IFPI Switzerland)	Gold	25,000^{^}
^{*} Sales figures based on certification alone.^{^} Shipments figures based on certification alone.

== Stella Soleil version ==
"Kiss Kiss"

Single by Stella Soleil

from the album Dirty Little Secret
- Released: 19 March 2001
- Length: 3:01 (radio edit)
- Label: Universal
- Songwriters: Juliette Jaimes; Sezen Aksu; Tarkan; Steve Welton-Jaimes
- Producers: Darran Bennett; Steve Welton-Jaimes

Stella Soleil singles chronology
"Torch" (2001)	"Kiss Kiss" (2001)	"Pretty Young Thing" (2002)

"Kiss Kiss" served as the debut single of American recording artist Stella Soleil. It is a remake of "Şımarık" with new lyrics. The English version was credited to by Juliette Jaimes, Sezen Aksu, Tarkan, and Steve Welton-Jaimes. The single was released to American radio on 19 and 20 March 2001. It was also released in regions of Europe, excluding the UK.

=== Music video ===
The music video is set on the beach during the late night. The video (directed by Hype Williams) shows Soleil dancing on the sand, while scenes go back and forth from birds eye views of landscape around the beach.

=== Charts ===
Chart (2001)	Peak position
US Mainstream Top 40 (Billboard)	27

== Holly Valance version ==
"Kiss Kiss"

Single by Holly Valance

from the album Footprints
- Released: 29 April 2002
- Length: 3:23
- Label: EngineRoom Music; Universal Music Australia
- Songwriters: Sezen Aksu; Juliette Jaimes; Steve Welton-Jaimes
- Producers: Darran Bennett; Steve Welton-Jaimes

Holly Valance singles chronology
"Kiss Kiss" (2002)	"Down Boy" (2002)

Music video
- "Kiss Kiss" on YouTube

Australian actress Holly Valance covered "Kiss Kiss" and released it as her debut single on 29 April 2002. Her version topped the charts of both Australia and the United Kingdom. On 26 January 2026, Holly Valance released the single "Kiss Kiss (XX) My Arse" after seeing a rough cut of the film A Super Progressive Movie.

=== Commercial performance ===
The single debuted at number one in the United Kingdom on 5 May 2002, selling 143,408 copies in its first week. The song made its debut on the Australian ARIA Singles Chart and UK Singles Chart at number one. It went on to spend nine weeks in the ARIA top 10, 13 weeks in the top 20, and seventeen weeks in the top 50. In Finland, Hungary, Ireland, and Italy, the song peaked within the top 10. It also reached the top 20 in Austria, Denmark, Germany, Greece, Sweden, New Zealand, and Switzerland. It was certified platinum by the Australian Recording Industry Association (ARIA) and gold by the British Phonographic Industry (BPI).

=== Music video ===
The official music video for Valance's version features a compilation of Valance herself with a variety of different looks and sexualised outfits whilst performing the song. The video opens with a close-up of Valance's lips, painted with a burnished red gloss, as she mimes a kiss at the viewer. Lightbulbs flash and pulse on a black background, gradually illuminating Valance's apparently-naked figure, save for two bars of light across her chest and hips. Valance is next shown within a second black room, this time surrounded by blue rectangular strips of light. During the video, these lights change to red before returning to their original color.

As Valance begins to sing, the view returns to the opening close-up scene, before cutting to show her sat within and surrounded by a black velvet structure. The room is illuminated further by a mosaic background pattern of flashing white lights. Between shots, two DJs are seen using a record table. During the chorus, the scene shifts to show Valance with six male backing dancers on a black and gold backdrop. The video switches between each of these settings throughout the video.

=== Track listings ===
- Australian CD single
1. "Kiss Kiss" (Wise Buddha mix) – 3:23
2. "Kiss Kiss" (Jah Wobble remix) – 5:15
3. "Kiss Kiss" (Agent Sumo 2) – 7:41
4. "Kiss Kiss" (Stargate R&B mix) – 3:02
- UK CD single
1. "Kiss Kiss" (Wise Buddha mix) – 3:25
2. "Kiss Kiss" (Jah Wobble remix) – 5:15
3. "Kiss Kiss" (Agent Sumo 2) – 7:41
4. "Kiss Kiss" (Stargate R&B mix) – 3:02
5. "Kiss Kiss" (video)
- UK cassette single and European CD single
1. "Kiss Kiss" (Wise Buddha mix) – 3:25
2. "Kiss Kiss" (Stargate R&B mix) – 3:02

=== Charts ===
==== Weekly charts ====
Chart (2002)	Peak position
Australia (ARIA)	1
Austria (Ö3 Austria Top 40)	11
Belgium (Ultratop 50 Flanders)	28
Belgium (Ultratip Bubbling Under Wallonia)	12
Denmark (Tracklisten)	20
Europe (Eurochart Hot 100)	8
Finland (Suomen virallinen lista)	7
France (SNEP)	50
Germany (GfK)	14
Greece (IFPI)	16
Hungary (Rádiós Top 40)	3
Hungary (Single Top 40)	4
Ireland (IRMA)	2
Italy (FIMI)	3
Netherlands (Dutch Top 40)	24
Netherlands (Single Top 100)	23
New Zealand (Recorded Music NZ)	17
Scottish Singles Sales (Official Charts)	1
Sweden (Sverigetopplistan)	12
Switzerland (Schweizer Hitparade)	19
UK Singles (Official Charts)	1

==== Year-end charts ====
Chart (2002)	Position
Australia (ARIA)	10
Austria (Ö3 Austria Top 40)	72
Europe (Eurochart Hot 100)	69
Germany (Media Control)	89
Ireland (IRMA)	34
Italy (FIMI)	15
Sweden (Hitlistan)	93
Switzerland (Schweizer Hitparade)	85
UK Singles (OCC)	14

=== Certifications ===
Region	Certification	Certified units/sales
Australia (ARIA)	Platinum	70,000^{^}
Italy (FIMI)	Gold	25,000^{*}
United Kingdom (BPI)	Gold	400,000^{^}
^{*} Sales figures based on certification alone.^{^} Shipments figures based on certification alone.

=== Release history ===
Region	Date	Format(s)	Label(s)	Ref(s).
United Kingdom	29 April 2002	CD; cassette	London	
Australia	3 June 2002	CD	EngineRoom Music; Universal Music Australia	
Germany	17 June 2002	CD	London	

== Other cover versions ==
Aside from "Kiss Kiss", there were many other covers of "Şımarık" in English and various languages, like a version sung by Hong Kong group E02 in Cantonese and an Egyptian cover version sung by Samy Mansour. Notable covers include:

- In 1998 Russian singer Filipp Kirkorov re-released "Şımarık" in Russian as Поцелуй (Kiss) from the album Ой, Мама, Шика Дам.
- In 1999, Ukrainian singer Viktor Pavlik (Ukrainian Віктор Павлік) re-released "Şımarık" in Ukrainian as "Rozbeshchenyy" (Ukrainian Розбещений) from the album "Aphiny, Kyiv, Istanbul", ukr. Афіни-Київ-Істанбул".
- In 2001, Spanish-Moroccan singer Hakim released La Muchacha Turca in Spanish as part of his album Entre dos orillas, but created his own lyrics.
- In 2006, South Korean singer Mina covered "Kiss Kiss".
- 8 feleséggel sok a baj / There are so many problems with 8 wives / (in Hungarian by Irigy Hónaljmirigy)
- La Muchacha Turca / Turkish Girl / (in Spanish, by Paco Ortega/Hakim, 2001)
- La Muchacha Guapa / Pretty Girl / (in Spanish by La Banda Pachuco, 2002)
- Ein Kuss / A Kiss / (in German by Die Schlümpfe, 1999)
- Žene Vole Dijamante / Women Love Diamonds / (in Serbian by Jelena Karleuša, 1998)
- Ekstaza / Ecstasy / (in Serbian by Dado Polumenta, 2005)
- El Bawsi (البوسة, in Arabic by Rida and Nina Boutros, 1999)
- Booseh Faransavi (in Persian by Mehran
- Yeki Na Doutaa (in Persian by Sharareh, 2000)
- Filakia (Φιλάκια, in Greek by Lefteris Pantazis, 2000)
- Neshika / Kiss / (in Hebrew by Rinat Bar, 1998)
- CHU!CHU!は恋の合言葉 (in Japanese by Kentarō Hayami, 2000)
- Bos (in Dari by Showwkat)
- Kiss Kiss (in English by Bodyjar, 2002)
- Kiss Kiss (in Cantonese by EO2 and Tiffany Lee, 2002)
- Kiss (Kita Sayang Sayang) (in Indonesian by Lilis Karlina, 2001)
- Chiki Chiki Bam Bam (in Telugu language by Tippu in Aadi, 2002)
- Beijo na Boca / Kiss in the Mouth / (in Portuguese by Mr. Jam)
- Dá-me Um Xoxo / Give me a Kiss / (in Portuguese by Tayti)
- Selinho na Boca (in Portuguese by Latino and Perlla, 2008)
- На Таркан близалката / Tarkan's lollipop / (in Bulgarian by Ruslan Mainov, 1999)
- Дай ми целувка / Give me a kiss / (in Bulgarian by Tonita, 1999)
- Хищница / Predator / (in Bulgarian by Extra Nina, 1999)
- Pusz-pussz (in Hungarian by Pa-Dö-Dő, 2003)
- Kiss-Kiss / TCM-istele / (in Romanian by Vacanța Mare in Cu oltenii la eclipsă show.)
- Poljubi me / Kiss Me / (in Slovenian by Sandi Selimčič)
- Të Më Japësh Një Puthje (in Albanian by Shkëlqim Kola)
- Just A Kiss (Muah) (in English at USA by an American artist named ENISA in 2022)

== Samplings and adaptations ==
=== Dj R'AN version ===
"Kiss Kiss"

Single by DJ R'AN featuring Mohombi and Big Ali
- Released: 26 September 2016
- Length: 2:51
- Label: Madison Music
- Producer: DJ R'AN

Music video
- "Kiss Kiss" by DJ R'AN feat. Mohombi and Big Ali on YouTube

Music video
- "Kiss Kiss" by Ardian Bujupi and DJ R'AN feat. Mohombi and Big Ali on YouTube

- In 2016, French Dj R'AN (also known as Lucenzo Dj) released an adapted version of the song with new lyrics and added music. The single also titled "Kiss Kiss" and featured vocals by Swedish Mohombi and American Big Ali with additional work by Willy William. A music video was also released.

An alternative release of the DJ R'AN version of "Kiss Kiss" was done in 2017 by Kosovar-German singer Ardian Bujupi with Dj R'AN featuring Mohombi and Big Ali.

Other samplings

- Yosi Piamenta released a version quoting Kol Hamesameach, a Hebrew language passage from the Talmud, but set to the melody of the song "Şımarık".
- An Israeli 6PM news program on Channel 10 named London et Kirschenbaum (named after the hosts, Yaron London and the program's late host Moti Kirschenbaum) is using a sample of this song in its opening theme.

== Usage in media ==
"Şımarık" was featured in films and soap opera including Beau travail, Romané and XX/XY.

"Şımarık" and sound effects of Tarkan's kiss sounds was used in several Chilean television programs, including: Calle 7, Yingo, En portada, Buenos Días a Todos, Muy buenos días, Mucho gusto, Gente como tú, La mañana de Chilevisión, and others.

"Şımarık" was used as the intro music for the Norwegian TV series about multi-cultural Norway, Migrapolis.

It was also used as the intro music for an Israeli TV current affairs news show named London et Kirschenbaum. In the United Kingdom, Channel 4 used the song in trailers for Graham Norton's chat show So Graham Norton in 2001.
