= Tarján =

Tarján is a Hungarian name, derived from an old Turkic title Tarkhan, meaning viceroy or prince. It may refer to:

== Places ==
- Tarján, Hungary

== People with the surname ==
- James Tarjan (1952), American chess grandmaster
- Robert Tarjan (1948), American computer scientist

== See also ==
- Tarcan (disambiguation)
- Tarkan (disambiguation)
