= Teoman (singer) =

Turkish singer and songwriter

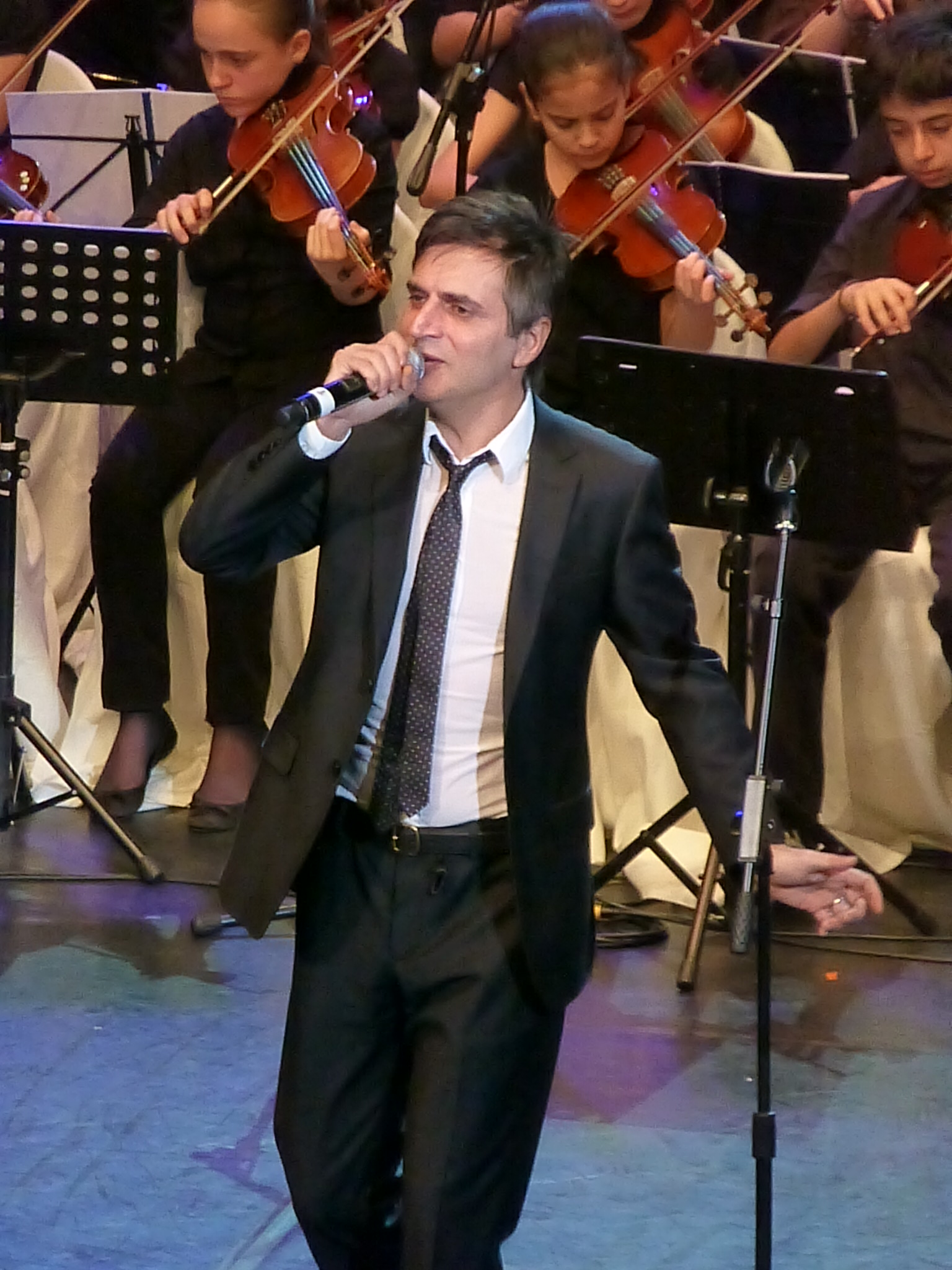
- Teoman in 2013
- Born: Fazlı Teoman Yakupoğlu; 20 November 1967 (age 58); Alucra, Turkey
- Education: Boğaziçi University
- Occupations: Singer; songwriter; actor
- Spouse: Ayşe Kaya (m. 2012; div. 2015)
- Children: 1
- Musical career
- Genres: Alternative rock; pop rock
- Instruments: Vocals; guitar
- Years active: 1997–present
- Labels: İstanbul; NR1; Avrupa
- Website: www.teoman.com

Fazlı Teoman Yakupoğlu (born 20 November 1967) is a Turkish acoustic rock singer and songwriter. His biggest hits include Paramparça, Senden Önce Senden Sonra, 17 and Papatya. On Papatya, Turkish rock singer Özlem Tekin is featured as a backing vocalist. Şebnem Ferah has also been featured on a couple of Teoman's tracks.

After studying business administration and mathematics at Boğaziçi University, he transferred to and graduated from the sociology department of the same university. He completed his graduate study on women studies at Istanbul University.

His formal music career was first started in his first band Mirage in 1986. Teoman staged with various bands for 10 years until his breakthrough song, "Ne Ekmek Ne de Su" (Neither Bread Nor Water) (music by Barlas Erinç- lyrics by Barlas Erinç and Teoman) which won the first prize in Roxy Müzik Günleri (Roxy Music Days). On August 4, 2011, he announced on his official website that he decided to quit music, indefinitely. Nevertheless, on November 24, 2012 Teoman officially announced his return to music. The same year he collaborated with Sebnem Ferah. In 2015 he released a new album "Eski Bir Rüya Uğruna" to great success. Teoman released official music video for "Limanında" in 2016, from his album named "Eski Bir Rüya Uğruna". In this music video, Teoman leans on Syrian dram through couple named Beriwan and Wassim, and their escape to Berlin, via Turkey.

== Discography ==
Studio albums

- Teoman (1996)
- O (1998) (She)
- Onyedi (2000) (Seventeen)
- Gönülçelen (2001) (Charmer)
- Teoman (2003)
- En Güzel Hikayem (2004) (My Most Beautiful Story)
- Renkli Rüyalar Oteli (2006) (Hotel of the Colorful Dreams)
- İnsanlık Halleri (2009) (Human Conditions)
- Aşk ve Gurur (2011) (Love and Pride)
- Eski Bir Rüya Uğruna... (2015) (For the Sake of an Old Dream)
- Gecenin Sonuna Yolculuk (2021) (Journey to the End of Night)
- Aşık Bir Adam (2023) (An Infatuated Man)
- Ben, Zargana, Deus Ex Machina (2023) (Me, Garfish, Deus Ex Machina)
- Kırılganlar Kralı (2025) (King of the Fragile)

Live albums

- Konser (2007) (Concert featuring Bülent Ortaçgil)
- Konserler Vol.1 (2012) (Concerts Vol.1)
- Konserler Vol.2 (2012) (Concerts Vol.2)
- Paramparça Senfoni (2012) (Shattered Symphony)
- Tek Başına (Live) (2021)
- Konser'22 (2023) (Concert'22)
- Teoman'ın Koyu Antoloji'si (Konser) (2025) Teoman's Dark Anthology (The Concert)

Compilation albums

- Best of Teoman (2004)
- Söz Müzik Teoman (2007) (Music and Lyrics by Teoman)
- Yavaş Yavaş (2014) (Slowly)
- Koyu Antoloji (2018) (Dark Anthology)
- Teoman ve Piyano (2021) (Teoman with the Piano)
- Rock and Roll 1 (2022)
- Yavaş Yavaş - A (2024) (Slowly - A)
- Yavaş Yavaş - B (2024) (Slowly - B)
- Yavaş Yavaş - C (2024) (Slowly - C)
- Rock and Roll 2 (2024)
- Yorgun Yılkı Atları (2025) (Old and Wild Horses)
- Rock and Roll (2026)
- Featuring Teoman (2026)

Remixes

- Remixler (2001) (Remixes)
- İstanbul'da Sonbahar Remixler (2001) (Autumn in Istanbul Remixes)
- Remixler 1 (2001) (Remixes 1)
- Duş Remixler (2001) (Shower Remixes)
- Ruhun Sarışın (2011) (Your Soul Is Blonde)
- Aşk ve Gurur Remixler (2001) (Love and Pride Remixes)
- Reworks (2025)
- Remixler 2025 (Remixes 2025)

== Filmography ==
- Elephants and Grass (Filler ve Çimen) (2000)
- Bank (2002)
- Mumya Firarda (Runaway Mummy) (2002)
- Balans ve Manevra (Balance and Maneuver) (2005) (actor, director, writer, composer and producer)
- Romantik (Romantic) (2007) (actor, composer)
- At the Bar (Barda) (2007)
