= Ölürüm Sana =

Ölürüm Sana may refer to:

- Ölürüm Sana (song), a 1998 song by Tarkan
- Ölürüm Sana (album), a 1997 album by Tarkan
