= Aacayipsin =

Studio album by Tarkan
- Released: 17 May 1994
- Recorded: August 1993 – February 1994
- Studios: Erekli Tunç Studios (Istanbul, Turkey)
- Genres: Pop, folk
- Length: 55:22
- Labels: İstanbul Plak, Angora, MMS, Atoll Music, Soyuz Music
- Producer: Şahin Söğütoğlu

Tarkan chronology
| Yine Sensiz (1992) | Aacayipsin (1994) | Ölürüm Sana (1997) |

Aacayipsin (You're Something Else) is Turkish singer Tarkan's second studio album, released on 17 May 1994. It was released by the İstanbul Plak label. It was recorded at Erekli Tunç Studio over a six-month period from August 1993 to February 1994. Mehmet Söğütoğlu produced the album, and all tracks were arranged by Rıza Erekli. Having achieved great success with his first album, Yine Sensiz, released at the end of 1992, Tarkan worked with a larger team for his second album. Shortly after the album's release, he made a big splash with the song "Hepsi Senin mi?", written and composed by Sezen Aksu. Renewing his style and image with the album, Tarkan received positive feedback upon its release.

The album featured works by artists such as Sezen Aksu, Ümit Sayın, Yıldız Tilbe, Kemal Sayın, Leyla Tuna, and Rıza Erekli. Tarkan wrote and composed songs such as "Eyvah", "Durum Beter", "Unutmamalı", and "Gül Döktüm Yollarına". He co-composed the music for "Eyvah" with Ozan Çolakoğlu. His first album, which consisted largely of arranged pieces, featured several tracks with Alpay Aydın. The duo subsequently parted ways. Of the twelve tracks, seven were released with music videos. All the tracks from the album appeared on music charts, and Tarkan received positive reviews from critics. Following the album's release, Tarkan performed the album's tracks in concerts and on radio and television programs. The album was released in several countries across Europe and Asia. The innovative style of his first album became a huge source of advertisement, and with the release of Aacayipsin and its millions of sales, he became one of the important names of Turkish pop music.

Achieving many firsts in Turkey, he gave over 60 concerts with this album in Turkey and Europe. Twenty-four of these concerts were stadium concerts, held as part of a tour sponsored by Doritos Panço, which brought Tarkan to audiences of tens of thousands in various cities across Turkey. The album, a major turning point in the artist's career, later sold nearly 2.5 million copies worldwide. With this album, Tarkan became known in European and Asian countries.

== Background ==
Tarkan released his first album, Yine Sensiz, on 26 December 1992, through the İstanbul Plak label. Recorded between 1990 and 1992, the album was produced by Mehmet Söğütoğlu. Featuring tracks such as "Kimdi?", "Gelipte Halimi Gördün Mü?", "Vazgeçemem", and "Çok Ararsın Beni", he achieved a major breakthrough with "Kıl Oldum". While cassette sales were slow, he performed almost all of the album's tracks on the program Elma on the Teleon channel in March 1993, and after this appearance, album sales began to rise rapidly.

In addition to his concerts in July, Tarkan released the songs "Gül Döktüm Yolularına" and "Bekle" and continued to receive positive feedback. Tarkan, who participated in radio and television programs as well as concerts, also released the song "Kış Güneşi", which was included in the album and whose lyrics and music were prepared by Yıldız Tilbe. It became one of the year's best slow songs and reached number one on the charts. He won the Best Male Pop Music Artist award at the 1st Kral TV Video Music Awards ceremony on 6 March 1993. He also left his mark on the awards ceremony by winning Best Lyricist, Best Composition, and the Best of '94 awards with the song "Hepsi Senin mi?", written and composed by Sezen Aksu. On 2 May 1995, he released a music video consisting of concert footage for the remix version of his song "Şeytan Azapta". The album sold over 1.5 million copies in Turkey, becoming the second best-selling album of the time after İbrahim Tatlıses' Haydi Söyle album.

== Release and promotion ==
Three days before the album's release, on 13 May 1994, Tarkan appeared as a guest on Cem Özer's program Laf Lafı Açıyor, along with Defne Samyeli. He performed songs from the album on the program. During this period, he shot music videos for the songs "Hepsi Senin mi?" and "Unutmamalı" from the album. The music videos for both songs were released simultaneously on 29 May 1994, and both songs reached number one on the charts. After the album's release, he began giving consecutive concerts, performing the songs from the album. He gave a seven-night concert at Rumelihisarı between 15-22 July 1994. Many figures including Şener Şen, Emel Sayın, Nükhet Duru, Sezen Aksu, Erol Evgin, Sertab Erener, Levent Yüksel, Müjde Ar, Osman Yağmurdereli, Cem Özer, Atilla Atasoy, and Melih Kibar attended the concert.

On 9 September 1994, he attended the first anniversary celebration of the ATV television channel, held at a hotel in Ataköy. During the live broadcast, Savaş Ay circulated among the guests, conducting short interviews. Tarkan also drew considerable criticism at the time for a remark he made during the interview. Following this gaffe, Tarkan distanced himself from the media and began giving less interviews. His concert, held in New York on 25 May 1995, was broadcast live on Kanal D. The song "Dön Bebeğim", for which he had filmed a music video in New York, also premiered during the concert break. In July 1995, he organized a concert tour sponsored by Panço, Doritos' chips brand at the time. The first leg of the concert took place in Diyarbakır on 26 July 1995. On July 5, 1995, he participated in the program Nereden Başlasak Nasıl Anlatsak, presented by Oktay Kaynarca and Meltem Cumbul, and performed a duet with artists such as Yıldız Tilbe, Ümit Sayın and Kenan Doğulu.

== Track listing ==
| No. | Title | Writer(s) | Composer(s) | Length |
|---|---|---|---|---|
| 1. | "Hepsi Senin mi?" | Sezen Aksu | Sezen Aksu | 4:05 |
| 2. | "Dön Bebeğim" | Ümit Sayın | Ümit Sayın | 4:45 |
| 3. | "Şeytan Azapta" | Sezen Aksu | Ozan Çolakoğlu | 5:00 |
| 4. | "Bekle" | Ümit Sayın | Ozan Çolakoğlu | 5:25 |
| 5. | "Eyvah" | Tarkan | Tarkan, Ozan Çolakoğlu | 4:10 |
| 6. | "Kış Güneşi" | Yıldız Tilbe | Nurhat Şensesli | 4:15 |
| 7. | "Unutmamalı" | Tarkan | Tarkan | 5:30 |
| 8. | "Gül Döktüm Yollarına" | Tarkan | Yehuda Badichi | 4:15 |
| 9. | "Durum Beter" | Tarkan | Tarkan | 3:40 |
| 10. | "Gitme" | Kemal Sayın, Ümit Sayın | Ümit Sayın | 4:30 |
| 11. | "Seviş Benimle" | Leyla Tuna | Ozan Çolakoğlu | 5:10 |
| 12. | "Biz Nereye?" | Rıza Erekli | Rıza Erekli | 4:50 |

== Other information ==
- One of the most popular songs on the album, "Hepsi Senin mi?", was released as a single under the name "Şıkıdım" on 6 April 1999, and became one of the hit songs.

== Doritos Panço tour and stadium concerts ==
After the album's release, Tarkan began giving numerous concerts. He performed consecutively at venues such as Rumelihisarı, Bodrum Castle, and the Bostancı Show Center. He also performed for thousands of people in countries such as the UK, US, Germany, and Switzerland. The concert, held at the Palladium in New York on 21 May 1995, was broadcast live on Star TV. At a press conference in the summer of 1995, he announced a Turkish tour through a partnership with the then-chips brand Doritos Panço. Thanks to audience members using the chips' wrappers to gain entry to the concert, Doritos became the best-selling chips in Turkey at the time. The first leg of the concert took place on 26 July 1995, at Diyarbakır Atatürk Stadium. At the time, there was much talk of him giving a concert in Diyarbakır, a zone affected by terrorist attacks. However, the concert was met with overwhelming interest. He gave a total of 24 concerts as part of his concert tour, which began in Diyarbakır, with the final leg taking place at İnönü Stadium on 20 September 1995. The concert was also broadcast live on Star TV.

=== Doritos Panço concert dates ===
| # | Date | City | Country | Venue |
|---|---|---|---|---|
| 1 | 26 July 1995 | Diyarbakır | Turkey | Diyarbakır Atatürk Stadium |
| 2 | 28 July 1995 | Gaziantep | Turkey | Kamil Ocak Stadium |
| 3 | 30 July 1995 | Hatay | Turkey | Şehir Stadium |
| 4 | 1 August 1995 | Mersin | Turkey | Tevfik Sırrı Gür Stadium |
| 5 | 3 August 1995 | Alanya | Turkey | Millî Egemenlik Stadium |
| 6 | 4 August 1995 | Antalya | Turkey | Antalya Atatürk Stadium |
| 7 | 7 August 1995 | Kuşadası | Turkey | —N/a |
| 8 | 9 August 1995 | Denizli | Turkey | —N/a |
| 9 | 10 August 1995 | Uşak | Turkey | —N/a |
| 10 | 11 August 1995 | Konya | Turkey | —N/a |
| 11 | 14 August 1995 | Eskişehir | Turkey | —N/a |
| 12 | 15 August 1995 | Bursa | Turkey | Bursa Atatürk Stadium |
| 13 | 16 August 1995 | Balıkesir | Turkey | —N/a |
| 14 | 17 August 1995 | Çanakkale | Turkey | —N/a |
| 15 | 18 August 1995 | Edirne | Turkey | —N/a |
| 16 | 21 August 1995 | İzmit | Turkey | —N/a |
| 17 | 22 August 1995 | Adapazarı | Turkey | —N/a |
| 18 | 29 August 1995 | Zonguldak | Turkey | —N/a |
| 19 | 30 August 1995 | Samsun | Turkey | —N/a |
| 20 | 1 September 1995 | Ordu | Turkey | —N/a |
| 21 | 2 September 1995 | Giresun | Turkey | —N/a |
| 22 | 4 September 1995 | Trabzon | Turkey | Hüseyin Avni Aker Stadium |
| 23 | 6 September 1995 | Erzurum | Turkey | —N/a |
| 24 | 20 September 1995 | Istanbul | Turkey | İnönü Stadium |

- The list contains the cities in Turkey Tour sponsored by Doritos Panço. The last concert of the tour in İnönü Stadium is sponsored by Pepsi.

== Personnel ==
- Vocals - Tarkan (all tracks)
- Production - İstanbul Plak
- Producer - Şahin Söğütoğlu
- Producer - Mehmet Söğütoğlu
- Music director - Ozan Çolakoğlu
- Arrangements - Ozan Çolakoğlu
- Supervisor - Tarkan
- Creative designing - Tarkan
- Tonmeister - Alp Turaç, Deneb Pinjo
- Mixing - Deneb Pinjo, Rıza Erekli
- Mastering - Duyal Karagözoğlu
- Graphic design - Gift Ajans
- Photographs - Sevil Sert
- Printing - Onur Ofset
- Vocals - Metin Can Erkencigil
- Back vocals - Levent Yüksel, Sertab Erener, Ümit Sayın, Şebnem Ferah, Deniz Arcak, Özkan Uğur, Orhan Atasoy, Gür Akad, Rıza Erelki, Ebru Aydın, Cihan Okan

== Charts ==
=== All-time charts ===
| Chart | Position |
|---|---|
| Hürriyet Turkey's Top 100 Albums | 9 |

== Release history ==
| Country | Date | Format | Label |
|---|---|---|---|
| Turkey | 17 May 1994 | Cassette | İstanbul Plak |
| Turkey | 24 June 1994 | CD | İstanbul Plak |
| Germany | 15 March 1996 | CD | Angora, MMS |
| Israel | 15 March 1996 | CD | İstanbul Plak, Atoll, NMC |
| Russia | 22 April 1998 | CD | Atoll, Союз |
| Worldwide | 25 September 2013 | Digital download | |
| Turkey | 23 March 2017 | LP | |

== Awards ==
| Year | Award | Category | Result |
|---|---|---|---|
| 1994 | 1st Kral TV Video Music Awards | Best Male Pop Artist | Won |
| 1994 | 1st Kral TV Video Music Awards | The Best of 1994 | Won |
