= Bu Gece =

Promotional single by Tarkan

from the album Tarkan, Ölürüm Sana
- Released: 1999
- Recorded: 1999
- Genre: Pop
- Length: 3:53 (Bu Gece Radio Edit only)
- Label: Polygram/Universal
- Songwriter: Tarkan
- Producers: Tarkan, Laurent Marimbert

Tarkan singles chronology
"Şıkıdım" (1999)	"Bu Gece" (1999)	"Kuzu Kuzu" (2001)

Alternative cover
- Promotional LP Available For This Album

"Bu Gece (Kır Zincirlerini)" ("Tonight - Break Your Chains") was originally formed part of Tarkan's 1997 album Ölürüm Sana (I'd Die For You) under the title of "Kır Zincirlerini". The song was written and composed by Tarkan. It was reproduced by Laurent Marimbert and re-mixed by Jeeb at ADS Studios for the European music market and included in Tarkan's compilation album Tarkan in 1998. It was released as a single after his previous two singles "Şımarık" and "Şıkıdım" in 1999. Other releases of this single only had two tracks, "Bu Gece" and "Unut Beni," as a B-side.

== Track listing ==
- Bu Gece (Kır Zincirlerini), 1999
1. Bu Gece (Kır Zincirlerini) Clubheroes Mix (5:33)
2. Bu Gece (Kır Zincirlerini) Radio Version (3:53)
3. Bu Gece (Kır Zincirlerini) DJ Tomcraft Mix (6:10)
4. Bu Gece (Kır Zincirlerini) Smash Vocal Mix (3:48)
5. Bu Gece (Kır Zincirlerini) Extended Version (5:29)
6. Bu Gece (Kır Zincirlerini) Acoustic Version (3:49)
7. Bu Gece (Kır Zincirlerini) Original Version (5:25)

== Charts ==
Chart (1999)	Peak position
Russian Singles Chart	4
Belgian Singles Chart	29
German Singles Chart	71
