= Tarkan (album) =

Compilation album by Tarkan
- Released: 27 September 1999
- Recorded: Erekli Tunç, Imaj & Istanbul Plak (Istanbul, Turkey) ADS & Guillaume Tell (France), Dynamic Work (Milan, Italy), Black Out (Belgium)
- Genre: Pop
- Length: 62:55
- Label: Universal
- Producer: Mehmet Söğütoğlu, Laurent Marimbert

Tarkan chronology
Ölürüm Sana (1997)	Tarkan (1999)	Karma (2001)

Singles from Tarkan
- 1. "Şımarık" Released: 1998; 2. "Şıkıdım" Released: 1999; 3. "Bu Gece" Released: 1999

Tarkan is a 1999 compilation album by Tarkan, composed of songs released in his 1994 Aacayipsin and 1997 Ölürüm Sana albums. It was initially released in France in 1998 but due to the success of his single "Şımarık", it was given a wider European release on 1 April 1999, with 14 tracks. Due to its popularity it was re-released with 15 tracks on 27 September in the same year. The sales of this album won Tarkan a Monaco World Music Award.

== Track listing ==
#	Song	Composer	Lyricist	Time
1	Şımarık (Radio Edit)	Sezen Aksu, Tarkan	Sezen Aksu	3:10
2	Ölürüm Sana	Tarkan	Tarkan	4:05
3	Bu Gece (Kır Zincirlerini) (Radio Edit)	Tarkan	Tarkan	3:53
4	Şıkıdım (Hepsi Senin Mi?) (Radio Mix)	Sezen Aksu	Sezen Aksu	3:15
5	Salına Salına Sinsice	Tarkan	Tarkan	3:56
6	İkimizin Yerine	Tarkan, Sezen Aksu	Tarkan, Sezen Aksu	4:42
7	İnci Tanem	Tarkan	Tarkan	5:38
8	Dön Bebeğim	Ümit Sayın	Ümit Sayın	4:45
9	Başına Bela Olurum	Tarkan	Tarkan	4:11
10	Gül Döktüm Yollarına	Tarkan	Tarkan	4:08
11	Unut Beni	Tarkan	Tarkan	4:08
12	Beni Anlama	Ozan Çolakoğlu	Pakize Barışta	4:08
13	Delikanlı Çağlarım	(Anonymous)	Tarkan	3:43
14	Şımarık (Long Version)	Sezen Aksu, Tarkan	Sezen Aksu	3:54
15	Bu Gece (Kır Zincirlerini) (Original Version)	Tarkan	Tarkan	5:29
16	Şıkıdım (Hepsi Senin Mi?) (Original Version)	Sezen Aksu	Sezen Aksu	3:54

== Extra information ==
The Japanese export had two bonus tracks, "Bu Gece" (Kir Zincirlerini) Club Remix and "Şımarık" (Malagutti Remix).

== Music videos ==
- "Şıkıdım"
- "Şımarık"
- "Bu Gece"

== Charts ==
Chart (1998 / 1999)	Peak position
German Albums Chart	7
Swiss Albums Chart	17
Austrian Albums Chart	22
French Albums Chart	26
Belgian Albums Chart	30
Dutch Albums Chart	33
Swedish Albums Chart	53

=== Year-end charts ===
Chart (1999)	Position
German Albums Chart	71
