= Tarkan (name) =

Tarkan is a Turkish given name. Notable persons with that name include:

- Tarkan (singer) (born 1972), German-Turkish pop singer (full name: Tarkan Tevetoğlu)
- Tarkan Gözübüyük (born 1970), Turkish guitarist
- Tarkan Mustafa (born 1973), English footballer
- Tarkan Tüzmen (born 1968), Turkish singer and actor

== See also ==
- Tarkan (disambiguation)
