= Yine Sensiz =

Studio album by Tarkan
- Released: 26 December 1992 (Cassette); 21 June 1993 (CD)
- Recorded: October 1990 – July 1992
- Studio: Erekli Tunç Studios (Istanbul, Turkey)
- Genre: Pop
- Length: 44:04
- Label: İstanbul Plak
- Producer: Mehmet Söğütoğlu (executive), Ozan Çolakoğlu

Tarkan chronology
Yine Sensiz (1992)	Aacayipsin (1994)

Yine Sensiz (Again Without You) is Turkish singer Tarkan's first studio album, released by İstanbul Plak on 26 December 1992. It was recorded between 1990 and 1992 at Erekli Tunç Studio in Istanbul. Produced by Mehmet Söğütoğlu, the album's tracks were arranged by Ozan Çolakoğlu. The album, with the release of "Kıl Oldum" about a week earlier, saw a strong rise in sales. Shortly after releasing this album which was produced without the support of any other artists, Tarkan took to stage on TRT 1's 1993 New Year's Eve program which brought him instant national recognition. In 1993, he released singles from the album, including "Kimdi?", "Gelipte Halimi Gördün Mü?", "Vazgeçemem", and "Çok Ararsın Beni", to positive reviews.

Many media outlets and music critics were divided about Tarkan's debut album. Some argued that it would not hold a candle to the exiting albums in the music market, while others expressed hope for its place in the rising pop music scene. At Alpay Aydın's insistence, Tarkan began work on the album. He signed with İstanbul Plak, which had not released an album since the late 1980s. He completed the album by writing Turkish lyrics over arrangements of mostly foreign songs. He co-wrote the lyrics and music with Alpay Aydın. Due to financial constraints, the album's recording and release took two years. Featuring pop, pop rock, and dance-pop, the album achieved a strong success upon its release. Following its release, Tarkan began to gain widespread recognition through his frequent radio and television appearances. A CD version was released on 21 June 1993. The album, which reached number one on the Turkish album charts, sold over 600,000 copies nationwide with an additional 400,000 copies distributed illegally. With the remix version on CD, it surpassed one million copies in circulation.

== Background ==
Raised in Germany, Tarkan's family moved to Karamürsel in 1986. There, Tarkan resumed middle school and began studying music at the Karamürsel Advanced Music Association. Upon entering high school, he and his family settled in Maltepe, Istanbul. There, he attended the Üsküdar Music Association and began studying music with Erol Sayan. Along with his school and music education, he began performing at music venues during the summer. Tarkan, who sang Turkish classical music, met Alpay Aydın during this period. Tarkan took the university entrance exam, but failed due to him focusing on his music and stage career. Later, at his brother's suggestion, he decided to leave Turkey to work as a laborer in Germany. Alpay Aydın dissuaded Tarkan and offered to produce an album. During this time, the two met Mehmet Söğütoğlu.

They then searched for songs by listening to many albums to make arrangements and write Turkish lyrics for works of artists such as Gipsy Kings, Khaled, Nick Fisher, Gary Hughes and Boney M. The song "Vazgeçemem" was then chosen for the producer to listen to, and Alpay Aydın arranged a studio to record it. Mehmet Söğütoğlu, son of the owner of İstanbul Plak, was present at the studio when the song was recorded and decided to produce the album. Şahin Söğütoğlu, the owner of İstanbul Plak, had not released a new album in many years. Once Tarkan and Alpay Aydın secured a producer, they prepared eight songs within a week. The duo was looking for an arranger for the album's recording sessions. They asked musicians they encountered on the minibus for help and they recommended Ozan Çolakoğlu, who was new to arranging. Tarkan and Alpay Aydın spoke with Ozan Çolakoğlu, and he accepted the offer. The recordings of the album were progressing slowly and the person who played the saxophone for the song "Kimdi?" was Tayfun Duygulu, whose own solo album had not yet been released at the time. After the album's recordings were completed, Ozan Çolakoğlu approached Rıza Erekli with an offer to mix the songs, and Erekli agreed. Mehmet Söğütoğlu sought financial assistance from his uncle, owner of Yaşar Kekeva Records, for the album's pressing, publishing, and promotion. However, Yaşar Kekeva lost his life in an armed attack during that period. Mustafa Kekeva, who became the head of Yaşar Kekeva Plak, provided financial support for the album's release and the album was released on 26 December 1992.

== Release and promotion ==
"Yine Sensiz" was released in Turkey at the end of 1992 and resonated widely in the music world. The album's lead single, "Kıl Oldum", quickly became a favorite on national radio stations and nightclubs. Five days after releasing his album, which he recorded over a long period of time due to financial difficulties, Tarkan participated in a television program for the first time, performing his song "Kıl Oldum" on TRT 1's 1993 New Year's program. Tarkan released music videos for the album's tracks, while also promoting the album with a series of guest appearances on television and radio programs in the early months of 1993. While cassette sales were slow, he performed almost all of the album's tracks on the Elma program on Teleon in March 1993, and after this appearance, album sales began to rise rapidly. Afterwards, Tarkan made his name known nationwide by appearing in television concerts and participating in many programs such as Çarkıfelek and 7'den 77'ye.

== Released tracks ==
His first music video was shot on 21 December 1992, for his song "Kıl Oldum". He appeared in the video wearing a leather jacket and jeans. His second video was shot for the song "Kimdi?", in which he also wore a leather jacket and jeans. The third video was shot for the upbeat song "Gelipte Halimi Gördün Mü?". The music video for the song was released on 19 April 1993. He released his song "Vazgeçemem" on 6 June 1993. As the first song released from the album, it received great acclaim and became one of the most listened to slow songs of the period. The song "Selam Ver" was the fifth song released from the album and the music video for the song was shot in a bar.

The sixth song released from the album was "Çok Ararsın Beni". The seventh and final track from the album was "Söz Verdim." The music video for the song was shot on a beach.

== Track listing ==
No.	Title	Writer(s)	Composer(s)	Length
1.	"Kıl Oldum (Note: Additional remix version available exclusively on CD. Remix by Adnan Göykem & Ozan Çolakoğlu.)"	Alpay Aydın	Tarkan	4:12
2.	"Kimdi? (Note: Actually, Khaled's "Didi")"	Tarkan	Khaled	4:23
3.	"Söz Verdim"	Alpay Aydın	Tarkan	4:14
4.	"Gelipte Halimi Gördün Mü? (Note: Actually, Los Kjarkas' "Wayayay")"	Alpay Aydın	Tarkan, Ulises Hermosa	3:46
5.	"Sarıl Bana"	Alpay Aydın	Tarkan	3:24
6.	"Oldu Canım Ara Beni (Note: Actually, Smokey's "Don't Play Your Rock 'n' Roll to Me")"	Alpay Aydın	Nicky Chinn, Mike Chapman	2:44
7.	"Vazgeçemem (Note: Actually, Gipsy Kings' "No Volveré")"	Tarkan	Jacques Joseph Baliardo, Maurice Victor Baliardo, Tonine Antoine Baliardo, Andre Jean Reyes, Canut Reyes, Nicolas Reyes	4:29
8.	"Çok Ararsın Beni (Note: Actually, Boney M.'s "No More Chain Gang")"	Alpay Aydın	Rainer Ehrhardt, Frank Farian, Fred Jay	4:44
9.	"Selam Ver"	Alpay Aydın	Ozan Çolakoğlu	5:05
10.	"Yetti Artık (Note: Actually, Azúcar Moreno's "Torero!")"	Alpay Aydın	Nick Fisher, Gary Hughes	3:08
11.	"Yine Sensiz (Note: Actually, The Communards's "Reprise")"	Tarkan	Jimmy Somerville	5:15

== Other information ==
- In the TV programs he participated in throughout 1993 and 1994, Tarkan emphasized that the songs on his first album, for which he did not compose the music, were Turkish adaptations of foreign songs.

== Personnel ==
- Tarkan – Vocals (all tracks)
- Mehmet Söğütoğlu – Producer
- Şahin Söğütoğlu – Executive producer
- Ozan Çolakoğlu – Arranger, tonmeister
- Rıza Erekli – Mixing
- Bernev Kip, Levent Candaş, Nurcan Eren, Ümit Sayın – Back vocals
- Levent Büyük – Acoustic guitar and electric guitar
- Erdinç Şenyaylar – Classic guitar and acoustic guitar
- Ergin Kızılay – Oud
- Münif Akıllı – Cello
- Tayfun Duygulu – Saxophone
- Alpay Aydın – Supervisor

== Release history ==
Country	Date	Format	Label
Turkey	26 December 1992	Cassette	İstanbul Plak
Turkey	18 July 1993	CD	İstanbul Plak
Japan	15 February 2003	CD	Meta Company
Turkey	23 July 2017	LP	İstanbul Plak
