= Tarcan =

Tarcan may refer to:

- Selim Sırrı Tarcan (1874-1957), Turkish educator, sports official and politician
- The Amazing Race Canada (TARCan)

== See also ==
- Tarkan (disambiguation)
- Tarkhan
