= Barlas Erinç =

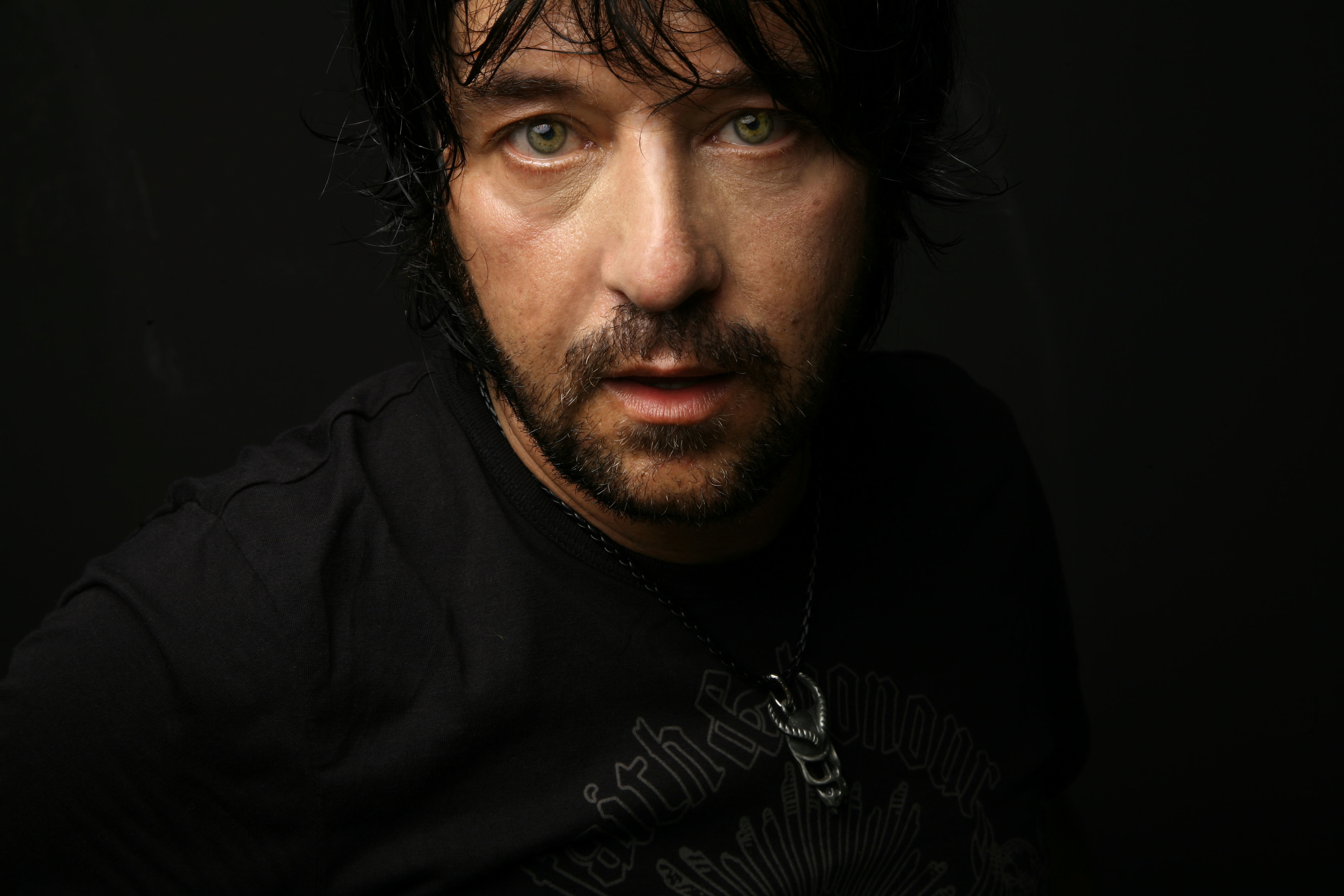

Background information
- Born: Barlas Eşber Erinç
- Origin: Ankara, Turkey
- Genres: Heavy metal, rock pop rock
- Occupations: Singer, songwriter
- Years active: 1980s–present
- Label: We Play / Balet Plak

Barlas Erinç is a Turkish musician, rock singer and song writer. He was born in Ankara, Turkey. He studied Business Administration and is a graduate of Gazi University in Ankara.

His first band AXE was a heavy metal band performing in Ankara in the 80s. Their concerts in Ankara and in Istanbul were huge success. He was not only the lead singer of the band but also writing the music and the lyrics. He was writing in English in the early years but then started writing in Turkish too.

Writing Turkish rock songs and not in an Anatolian-folk way but rather in a western style was something quite new in those days when most of his peers were playing cover songs at gigs. Barlas Erinç not only inspired many of his peers who now became recognized Pop-Rock musicians in Turkey but wrote songs for them. He started writing songs for other artists with Umay Umay's first album. He wrote all of her songs in this album including ‘Hareket Vakti- Its time to move on’. This song is the only cover song in Emre Aydın's first album, Afili Yalnızlık.

Barlas wrote Turkish female rock singer Özlem Tekin's first single "Aşk Herşeyi Affeder mi? -Does love forgive everything?" that shot to the top of the charts. Teoman, is another Turkish rock celebrity whom Barlas wrote the breakthrough song of, "Ne Ekmek Ne de Su- Neither bread nor water" with which he won the Roxy Music Days trophy.

Both Özlem Tekin and Teoman have many of Barlas songs in their albums. Barlas wrote around 300 songs and 30 of them became hits. He wrote not only for rock singers but for artists at a wide range of genres including Candan Erçetin ("Ağlıyor musun"- Are you crying from Melek album).

Barlas produces albums for other artists, such as; Gülhan's "Gülhan" and "Aynıyız Seninle/ We're the same" and Dilek Budak's "Dilek Budak."

Barlas also wrote the song "Kalbimizde Şampiyon- The Champion in our heart" for the football team Galatasaray.

== Discography ==
- Albums
- (1996) Bara Gidelim
- (1999) Kelebek
- (2002) Dünya Bi Acayip
- (2008) Daha Derin
- (2012) Sende Kalan
- (2013) Öyle Yaşıyorum İşte
- (2020) Tık Tık

EPs

- (2016) Kelebek/Küt Küt
- (2018) Hani Nerde Aşk

Singles

- (2013) "Her Akşam Votka Rakı"
- (2018) "Kanasın"
- (2018) "Kanasın" [Remixes] (with Abdullah Özdoğan)
- (2018) "Ayrılık Trenleri"
- (2019) "Bozdur Yeminleri"
