= Ebru Aydın =

- Born: 3 June 1973 (age 53); Istanbul, Turkey
- Origin: Istanbul
- Genres: Pop, Jazz, Rock
- Occupations: Singer, songwriter
- Years active: 1990–present
- Labels: DMC, BMG
- Website: www.ebruaydin.com

Ebru Aydın (born 3 June 1973) is a Turkish pop, rock and jazz singer and songwriter. She is known in the Turkish music industry as "The singer who made the first cover in Turkey". She is also known for her appearance with the Turkish Megastar Tarkan and Zerrin Özer. She is widely known for her powerful voice and the cover songs she recorded in 1993. In 1997, Ebru Aydın released her one and only album called Son Verdim.

== Biography ==
Ebru Aydın was born in Istanbul, to Neşe Aydın, a Jazz Singer from the 1970s in Turkey. Ebru's father is Güven Aydın. He is also a well-known piano player and jazz artist in Turkey. Ebru started her music studies at a very young age, singing musicals and jazz at home with her parents.

Her very first performance was in 1990 in Istanbul. She performed standard jazz songs. After a while, the Turkish Megastar Tarkan offered her a position in his band as a backing vocalist. She had been touring with Tarkan for several years, and they have performed the biggest stadium concerts in Turkey, and also they have performed in Germany, New York City, London and all over the world. Ebru Aydın also took part in the recording sessions of Tarkan's Aacayipsin.

When Tarkan decided to move to the United States, Ebru started to work with Zerrin Özer. After a while, Ebru started to work on her solo album and released it in 1997.

Ebru moved to TRNC in 2002 and lived there for 6 years while preparing her new EP "Müsaadenizle" (1 August 2008).

Ebru Aydın currently lives in Istanbul. She is married to contemporary classical music producer Eren Yağmuroğlu. The couple was married in Las Vegas in 2011.

In 2018, she released a new song, "Bipolar".
