= Migrapolis =

Norwegian television programme

Migrapolis (1997-2016) was a Norwegian award-winning TV programme about the everyday lives of immigrants in Norway since 1997.

The programme's theme is multi-cultural Norway and it contains interviews with people of different backgrounds than Norwegian. Migrapolis focuses on problems and cultural differences faced by immigrants in Norway. Its goal is to spotlight the positive and negative sides of the internationalisation of Norway. Earlier, the programme featured a multi-lingual news section with news in Vietnamese, Somali, Urdu and other languages. This has since been dropped.,

In 2007, Migrapolis won Gullruten (the equivalent of the American Emmy award), for best show in the category of lifestyle programs.

In 2009, Migrapolis received an award for building bridges between people in Norway. The organisation " Norske Kirkeakademier" rewarded the television show for challenging prejudices in the Norwegian society and for showing how diverse the minorities in the country are.

Migrapolis was on the air every Wednesday on prime time. The show was rated in average over 300 000 pr. episode. This represented one third of the viewing audience when the programme was aired.

The editorial staff represented a variety of different cultural and religious backgrounds.

Today Migrapolis is also a weekly radio show hosted by Dang Trinh.

== Comments in Norwegian media ==
The programme has made itself obsolete because it does not understand that the average Norwegian is a multicultural person. In the same way that 'new Norwegians' no longer need to isolate themselves, it is no reason why they should do this on TV. Many people feel that the programme has fallen down because no one dares question quality as long as an immigrant is involved. Norwegians are too afraid of confrontation to do this. After all, the programme contains a strong general enlightening intention. On the other hand it contains a confusing mix of professional and unprofessional hosts, its production is cheap, and it is visually boring. More or less untouched, Migrapolis has been allowed to continue regardless of budget cuts, criticism, low ratings and the fact that it has been moved around on the NRK schedule so often that hardly anyone knows when it's on. As a conclusion, this gives an insight to NRK's unserious treatment of the programme. It is a treatment that sends strong signals of indifference and a fear of being politically incorrect by shutting the whole thing down. (Source:''Aftenposten'' 25 September 2003, translated from the Norwegian language)
