= Turgut Berkes =

Turkish rock musician, painter, and writer (1953–2018)

Turgut Berkes (20 November 1953 – 20 August 2018) was a Turkish rock musician, painter, and writer. He was born in 1953 in İzmir, Turkey.

He was educated at the TED Ankara College and then at Bournemouth and Poole College of Art. He worked as a radio programmer, librarian, journalist and translator until 1989 when he founded with his partner Fuat Güner (of the famous Turkish pop trio Mazhar-Fuat-Özkan (MFÖ)) FT Recording Studios in Istanbul, which was at the time the most advanced in Turkey. In 2000 he released a solo album titled Karakutu ("The black box"), which was met with great critical acclaim. He continued to live and worked in Istanbul, dividing his time between freelance literary & technical translation work, music production, rehearsals and concerts with his band "Karakutu" and a "perennial virtual album" project; whereby new material was uploaded regularly and could be downloaded freely from his official website.

He lived in Bodrum at a tranquil bay from 2007 until his death with his family and cats. He wrote songs and tried to survive on translations. He had great friends like Ilban Ertem, who is a talented artist.
