= Salına Salına Sinsice =

Single by Tarkan

from the album Tarkan, Ölürüm Sana
- Released: 1998
- Recorded: 1997
- Genre: Turkish pop, dance-pop
- Length: 3:55 (radio edit)
- Label: İstanbul Plak
- Songwriter: Tarkan

Tarkan singles chronology
"İkimizin Yerine" (1997)	"Salına Salına Sinsice" (1998)	"Ölürüm Sana" (1998)

"Salına Salına Sinsice" ("Swaying Insidiously") is the fourth single taken from Tarkan's 1997 album Ölürüm Sana. Lyrics and music were credited to Tarkan; although it was a much-loved song at the time of its release, there was some confusion as to who wrote it.

== Music video ==
For the music video, Metin Arolat was in charge of Tarkan's hairstyle and clothes. He had worked in the fashion industry and with famous artists in the 1990s.

== Extra information ==
The third track on the album "Salına Salına Sinsice" was remixed when its music video was released. This remixed version was exclusive to the video and was never published on this or any following release.

== Tag ==
- Composer and music: Tarkan
- Edit: Ozan Çolakoğlu
- Electric guitar: Erdem Sökmen
- Percussion: Aydın Karabulut
- Bass guitar: James Cruz
- Costume: Bahar Korçan
