= Ölürüm Sana (song) =

Single by Tarkan

from the album Ölürüm Sana
- Released: July 12 1998
- Recorded: 1997
- Genre: Turkish pop, dance-pop
- Length: 4:10 (Ölürüm Sana Radio Edit only)
- Label: İstanbul Plak
- Songwriter: Tarkan
- Producers: Tarkan, Ozan Çolakoğlu

Tarkan singles chronology
"Salına Salına Sinsice" (1998)	"Ölürüm Sana" (1998)	"Şımarık" (1998)

"Ölürüm Sana" ("I'd Die For You") is a 1998 song by Tarkan featured in the album Ölürüm Sana.

== Music video ==
The music video for the song was shot in New York, sponsored by Loft (clothing brand).

== Tag ==
- Regulation: Ozan Çolakoğlu
- Electric guitar: Erdem Sökmen
- Percussion: Aydın Karabulut
- Bass guitar: James Cruz
- Costume: Bahar Korçan
