= Özgür Buldum =

Turkish music producer

Özgür Buldum (born 8 May 1976) is a well known Turkish music producer sharing 80% of Turkish commercial jingles sector with four other producers. He also has a good reputation in Turkish Pop Music having worked with great singers such as Tarkan, Candan Erçetin, Nazan Öncel, Meyra as arranger, producer, lyricist and composer.
