= London et Kirschenbaum =

Israeli current affairs news show

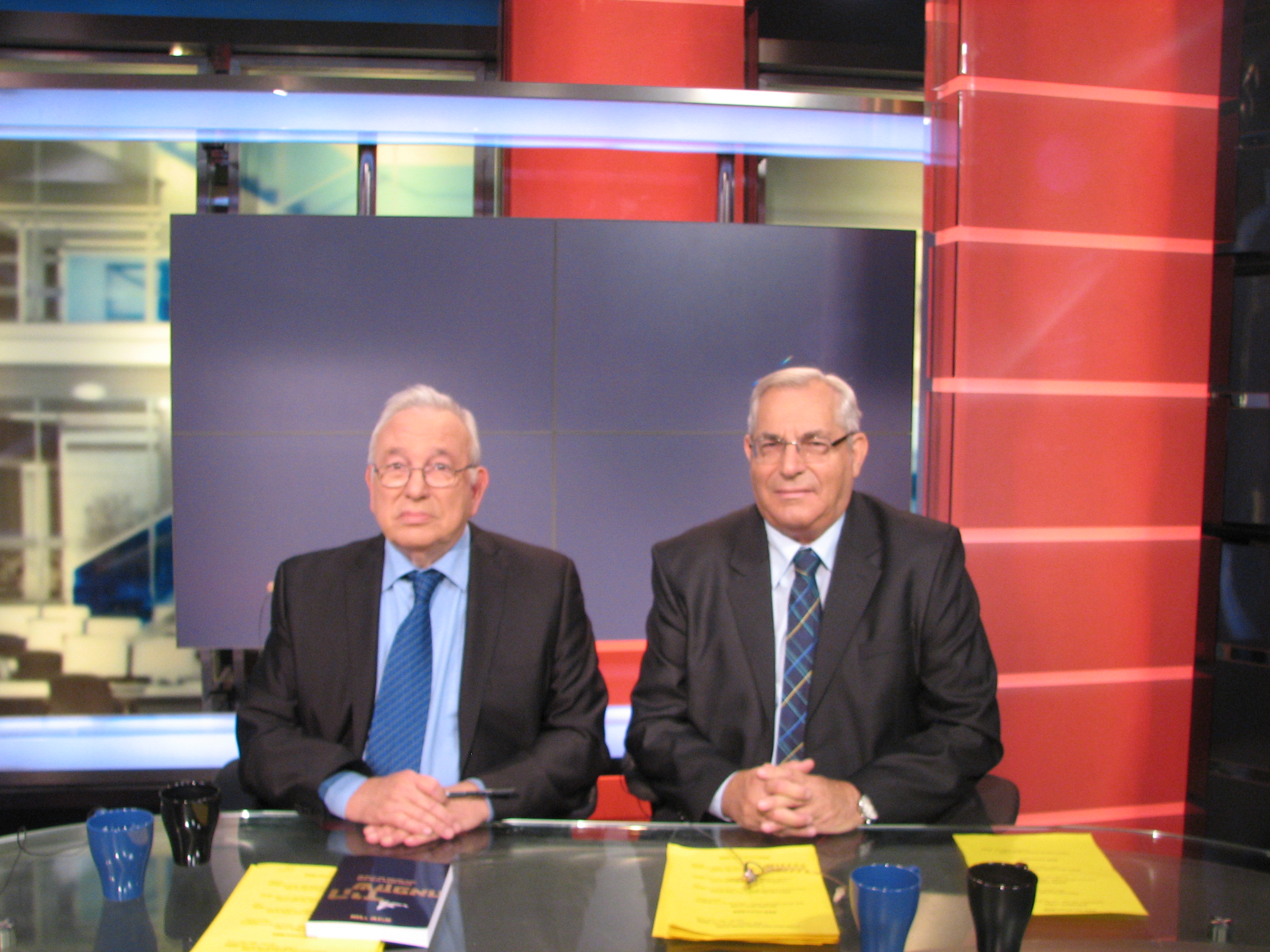
Yaron London and Moti Kirschenbaum in the studio

London et Kirshenbaum (Hebrew: לונדון את קירשנבאום; lit. London & Kirschenbaum) was an Israeli current affairs news show on Israeli Channel 10 between 2002 and 2019. Up to 2015 it was hosted by two veterans Israeli journalists, Yaron London and Moti Kirschenbaum until Kirschenbaum's death, afterwards London continued to host the show under the same name in honor of Kirschenbaum.

== Overview ==
The show interviewed Israeli politicians, public figures, artists and scientists, and often ended with music performance. The show won an Israeli Academy Award for best current affairs news show in 2005. Despite Kirschenbaum's death on September 25, 2015, London stated that the show would stay on air and its title would remain unchanged.

Its last show aired on January 10, 2019.

== Regular guests ==
- Raviv Drucker – Political commentator
- Zvi Yehezkeli – Arab world affairs commentator and head of the Arab desk at channel 10
- Nadav Eyal – Foreign Affairs commentator and head of the International desk at News 10
- Matan Hodorov – Economic commentator

== See also ==
- Television in Israel
- Culture of Israel
