= Yaron London =

Israeli media personality and journalist

- ירון לונדון
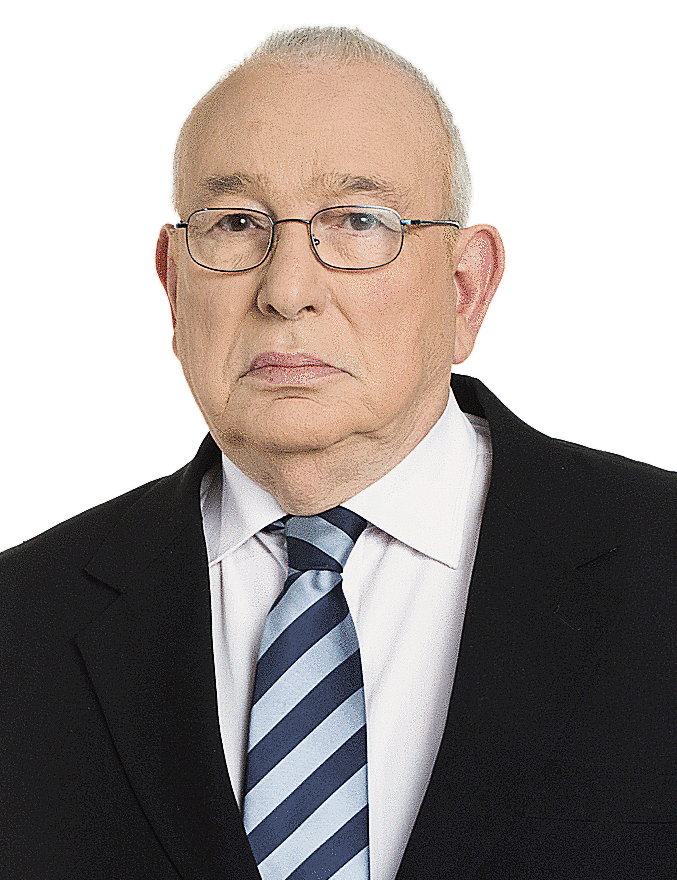
- Yaron London, 2013
- Born: August 24, 1940 (age 85); Tel Aviv, Mandatory Palestine
- Education: Bezalel Academy of Art and Design
- Occupations: Television presenter, filmmaker, actor, songwriter
- Notable credit(s): Channel 1 (Israel); Channel 2 (Israel); Channel 10 (Israel); Yediot Aharonot
- Spouse: Nira London
- Children: 3

Yaron London (Hebrew: ירון לונדון; born 24 August 1940) is an Israeli media personality, journalist, actor and songwriter.

== Biography ==
Yaron London was born in Tel Aviv. His father was an actor, Bezalel London. London's surname does not indicate British roots, but rather originate from the fact that registration officials mistakenly changed the original surname "Ledman" to "London".

London studied at Herzliya Hebrew High School and the agricultural boarding school HaKfar HaYarok. In 1961, after serving in the IDF, he moved to Jerusalem to study graphics at Bezalel Academy of Art and Design.

He lives in Afeka, Tel Aviv. He was married to Nira, with whom he has three children. In 2005, Nira suffered a stroke. She died in February 2010.

== Media career ==
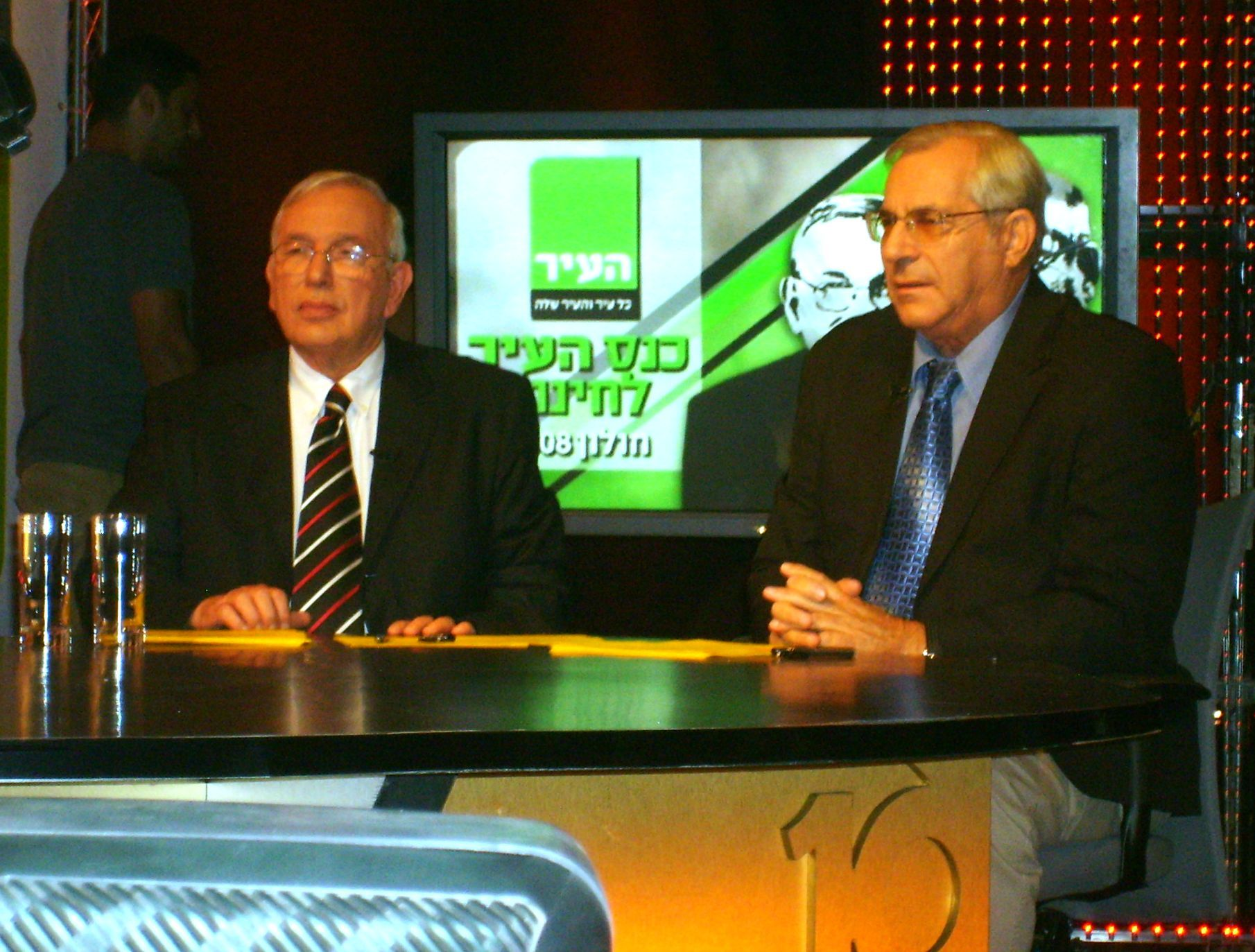
London et Kirschenbaum

In 1962, during his studies, he began working for Kol Yisrael as a news announcer. He hosted HaYom HaZeh ("This day"), the first current affairs program in Israeli electronic media.

In 1969 he was sent by the Israel Broadcasting Authority to Paris as its correspondent in Western Europe. In the early 1970s he returned to Israel and joined Channel One as a talk show host, and later became head of the drama department. He also directed several documentaries.

In 1988 he left the television to become a correspondent and publicist in Yediot Aharonot. In 1990 he returned to Channel One, and co-hosted the children's show "Mesibat Gan" ("Garden Party") with Rivka Michaeli. In 1994, soon after the establishment of Channel Two, he made several documentaries for Keshet, including "The Fat Man with the Sony", a month-long travelogue in South East Asia.

In 2003 he began co-hosting the daily current affairs program "London & Kirschenbaum" with Moti Kirschenbaum (whom he had met working for Channel One) on Channel Ten. In 2008, they both signed for two more years with the Channel Ten. His other activities included illustrating a poetry book in 1962, and writing several popular tunes, including one for HaGashash HaHiver. His songs were recently published in a compilation album. In 1979 he appeared in the film Schlager starring Hagashash HaHiver members and in 1983 he starred in Yitzhak Yeshurun's A Married Couple, as well as several children tapes. In 2008 he made a series titled "The scenario", which dramatizes potential disasters that might strike Israel.

In 2019, London said in a TV interview: “The Arabs are savages. They hate not only Jews. Above all, they’re murdering one another. Right, left, forward, to the east, to the west, Arabs are slaughtering Arabs.” He later apologised, but also said to Gideon Levy on a different TV show, that “the Palestinians are no different. It's the culture.” In 2023, during the Gaza war, London stated in an interview that "Gaza must be flattened, even at the cost of harming innocents."

== Awards and recognition ==
In December 2007 he was awarded the Sokolow Prize for lifetime achievement.

In December 2010, London was awarded the Eliav-Sartawi Award for Middle Eastern Journalism.

== See also ==
- Television in Israel
- Hasamba
- London et Kirschenbaum
