= Şıkıdım =

Single by Tarkan

from the album Tarkan, Aacayipsin
- Released: 1999
- Recorded: 1998
- Genre: Pop
- Length: 3:15 (Şıkıdım Radio Edit only)
- Label: Polygram/Universal
- Songwriter: Sezen Aksu
- Producer: Laurent Marimbert

Tarkan singles chronology
"Şımarık" (1999)	"Şıkıdım" (1999)	"Bu Gece" (1999)

"Şıkıdım" (pronounced [ʃɯkɯˈdɯm]; "Shake") is a song by Turkish singer Tarkan. It was originally released on his 1994 album lending its title to the album's name, Aacayipsin (Hepsi Senin Mi?). It is a Sezen Aksu song, reproduced by Laurent Marimbert and re-mixed by Yves Jaget for the European music market and included in Tarkan's compilation album Tarkan in 1998. It was released as a single after the success of his previous single "Şımarık" in 1999.

This song was later released in English as "Shikidim" on Tarkan's 2006 English-language debut, Come Closer. This song has been covered in Persian by a Girl Group called "Silhouettt" for his debut album "Ab, Atash, Va Khak" and the song named "Paeez". It was also covered by British grime artist Skepta, Russian pop singer Philipp Kirkorov, the Israeli Duo Datz, Ukrainian singer Viktor Pavlik and Bulgarian singer Georgi Hristov.

== Cover version ==
For film Dhoom was covered in Hindi as Shikdum, lyrics were penned by Sameer. The 'Shikdum' music is lifted from his big hit "Şıkıdım".

== Track list ==
Şıkıdım (Hepsi Senin Mi?), 1999

1. Şıkıdım (Hepsi Senin Mi?) (Radio Mix) (3:15)
2. Şıkıdım (Hepsi Senin Mi?) (Original Version) (3:51)

== Charts ==
Chart (1999)	Peak position
Belgian Singles Chart	6
French Singles Chart	10
Swiss Singles Chart	22
Dutch Singles Chart	32
German Singles Chart	35
Austrian Singles Chart	40
Swedish Singles Chart	47
