= Özlem Tekin =

Turkish singer and actress (born 1971)

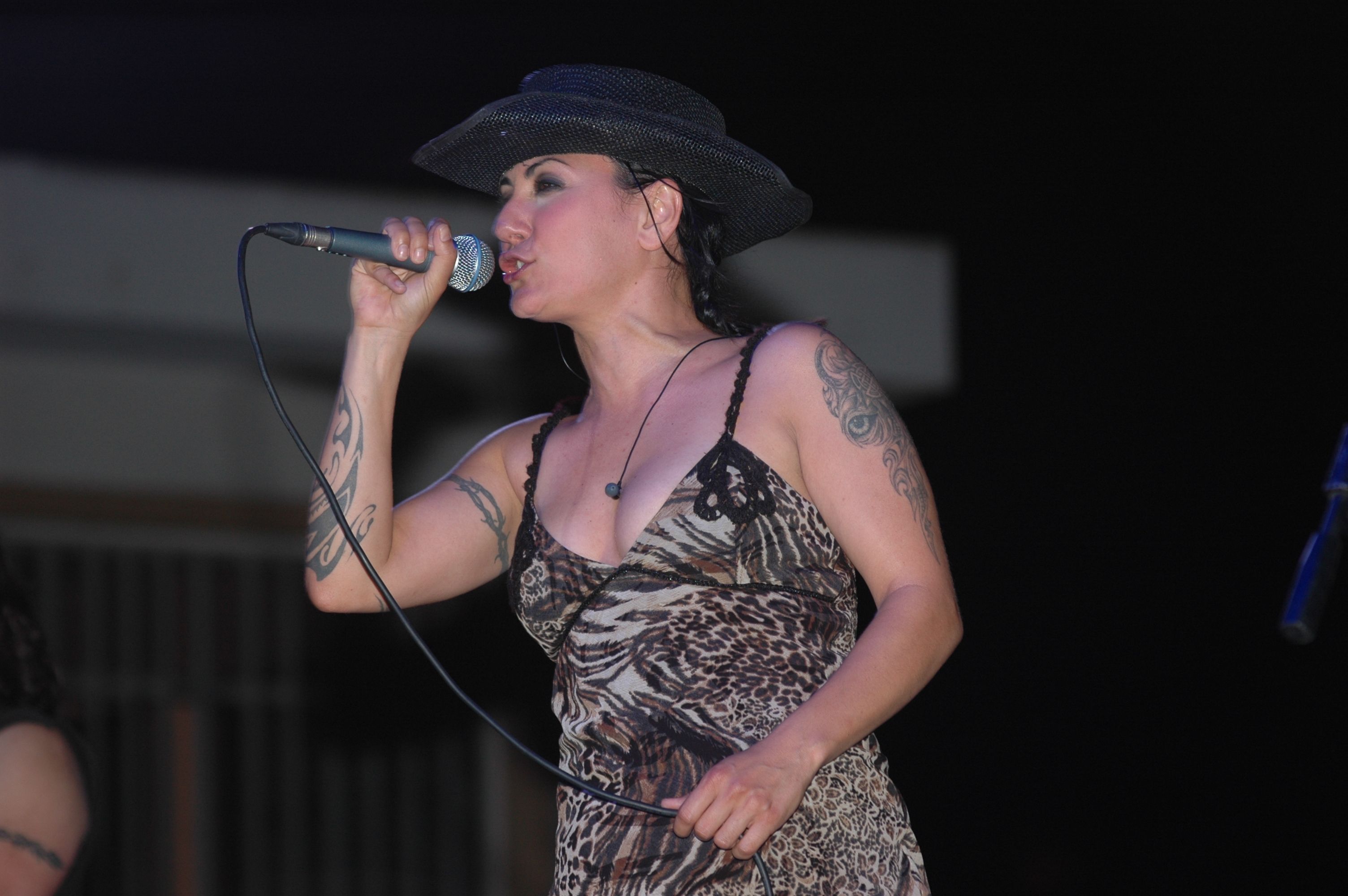

Background information
- Born: November 18, 1971 (age 54); California, United States
- Genres: Acoustic rock, hard rock, punk rock, pop, metal
- Occupations: Singer, songwriter, actress
- Years active: 1992–2016
- Labels: Peker Müzik, İstanbul Plak, Sony Music

Özlem Tekin (born November 18, 1971) is a Turkish-American singer and occasional actress, primarily known for her music. Though she started out in the hard rock genre, her music has progressed to incorporate different styles such as house, punk, pop and Turkish folk music.

== Life and career ==
Özlem Tekin was born in California, United States into a Turkish-American family. Her father Talat Tekin was a prominent Turkologist and an Altaicist at UC Berkeley. The Tekins moved to Turkey when she was four years old. Özlem grew up in Ankara, where she studied classical western music at the Hacettepe University Music Conservatory in Ankara, specializing in the clarinet.

She started out as the vocalist of The Bad. The Bad was an underground rock band that, like many others at the time, frequently played club gigs covering popular songs. In 1993, she met Şebnem Ferah --who later became another famous rock musician in Turkey-- and joined the successful all-female rock band Volvox. Özlem occasionally performed as the lead singer as well.

While still in Volvox, she met Hakan Peker and they started working on her debut solo album in 1994. This album, Kime Ne (who cares?), was eventually released in December 1995 to widespread critical acclaim. The first single "Aşk Herşeyi Affeder Mi?" (Does love forgive everything?), written by Barlas Erinç shot to the top of the charts. Other hit tracks include "Duvaksız Gelin" (Bride without a veil) and "Herkes Şanslı Doğmuyor" (Not everyone is born lucky).

Then, Özlem Tekin left Hakan Peker's record label and signed with İstanbul Plak which also signed other popular singers such as Tarkan. Her second album Öz was released in February 1998. This spawned "Yol" which became an enormous hit.

Laubali came out a year later to great acclaim.

Özlem started up her own TV show on Kanal D called Yaz Rüzgarı (Summer Wind) in 2000. This aired for 1 hour, 5 days a week and received high ratings. In 2003 she started acting in the TV series Sil Baştan (From the Beginning). This show aired for 2 years, also with high ratings.

In 2005, she starred in the stage musical Mucizeler Komedisi (The Comedy of Miracles). That same year, her new album 10987654321 was released, which presented a much harder sound than her previous efforts.

In 2006, she co-starred with Cem Yılmaz in the movie Hokkabaz (The Trickster). In the same year, she also featured in the TV movie Maçolar.

Her fans celebrated her tenth year in music by naming a forest after her: "Özlem Tekin-Bahar Ormanı (Özlem Tekin-Spring Forest)" by her fans.

In 2007, she had a role in another TV movie Fesupanallah as well as acting on stage with the famous Metin Serezli in a theater show named "Kim O". She also featured in duets with up and coming musicians during the year. (Ozturk's "Ben Uyurken," Badem's "Kalpsiz")

In 2008, she started a new TV programme at Kral TV, one of the most established national music channels in Turkey. The programme's name is Hiperaktif (hyperactive) after Özlem's character. Also in 2008 she featured with Turkish singer Mişa, in his song "Dost Kalamam".

In 2010, after a long break since her last album, she released her sixth studio album, Bana Bi'şey Olmaz. One of the old tracks, "Sil Baştan", which she wrote for the TV series with the same name, is in this album. She also recorded "Sen Anla" which was written by her and vocalized, and used by a famous Turkish singer, Levent Yüksel, in his earlier album. One of the interesting things about new album is that she interpreted a famous Anatolian folk song "Hey Onbeşli" as "Aslan Yarim", in her own musical style. The first video clip from this album was "Yatağım Boş". After a while, second video clip "Kimse Bilmez" started to appear on TV channels. Third video clip "Sen Anla" was released and had a better popularity than the previous singles.

In 2016, she left city life behind and moved to a farm in Milas, has lived largely out of the public eye while focusing on farming.

== Discography ==
=== Kargalar ===
Released by Ateş Müzik (2013).

Track Listing

1. Kargalar (Crows)
2. Asker (Soldier)
3. Kiyamet (Apocalypse)
4. Ay (Moon)
5. Sebepsiz Savaş (Causeless war)
6. Dünyam (My World)
7. Tarlalar (Fields)
8. Kargalar Remix
9. Dünyam Remix
10. Asker Remix

=== Bana Bi'şey Olmaz (Nothing Would Happen to Me) ===
Released by Sony Music) (2010).

Track Listing

1. Bana Bi'şey Olmaz
2. Kimse Bilmez
3. Yatağım Boş
4. Şikayetim Var
5. Sen Anla
6. Yüzde Seksen
7. Erkekliğime Ver
8. Vur Beni
9. Aslan Yarim
10. Sil Baştan
11. Kimse Bilmez (Acoustic)

=== 109876543210 ===
Released by İstanbul Plak (2005).

Track Listing

1. Değmez
2. Gezegen X
3. Cinayet
4. Belki
5. Dene
6. Kaf Dağı
7. Aşk Yangın
8. A) Şık
9. Aşinayım Firara
10. Adımı Söyle

=== Tek Başıma (All Alone) ===
Released by İstanbul Plak (2002)

Track Listing

1. Kimbilir
2. Dağları Deldim
3. Hep Yek
4. Oof
5. Kırıldım
6. Deli Gibi
7. Onun İçin
8. Aşka Dair
9. İki Adım
10. Daa

=== Laubali (Cavalier) ===
Released by İstanbul Plak, (1999).

Track Listing

1. Laubali
2. Vurma
3. Biri Var
4. Biberi Bol
5. Bu Kalp
6. Kumdan Kaleler
7. Yazmamışlar
8. Ve Olamadı Aşk
9. Sorma
10. Beni Yakan Aşkın
11. Bir yaz Günü

=== Öz ===
Öz (English: Essence) is the second album by Turkish singer Özlem Tekin. It was released on 15 December 1998 by publisher Istanbul Plak. The album has ten songs.

Track Listing

1. "Bahar" (composition-lyrics: Barlas)
2. "Öz" (composition-lyrics: Özlem Tekin)
3. "Yol" (composition-lyrics: Özlem Tekin)
4. "Saat" (composition-lyrics: Özlem Tekin)
5. "Paparazzi" (composition-lyrics: Özlem Tekin)
6. "Tarlalar" (composition-lyrics: Özlem Tekin)
7. "Duvar" (composition-lyrics: Özlem Tekin)
8. "Dünya" (composition-lyrics: Özlem Tekin)
9. "Çok" (composition-lyrics: Özlem Tekin)
10. ”Hiç" (composition-lyrics: Barlas)

=== Kime Ne (Who Cares) ===
Released by Peker Müzik (1995, December 15).

Track Listing

1. Aşk Her Şeyi Affeder mi
2. Sebepsiz Savaş
3. Duvaksız Gelin
4. Yar Bana Varmadı
5. Kime Ne
6. Herkes Şanslı Doğmuyor
7. Niye Bana Bu Ceza
8. Adresler Karıştı
9. Var mı Yan Bakan
10. Gel Bu Yaz
