= Tarkan =

Tarkan may refer to:

== People ==
- Tarkan (name), a given name (including a list of people with the name)
- Tarkan (singer) (born 1972), Turkish pop singer

== Other uses ==
- Tarkhan, an ancient Turkic and Mongol nobility title
- Tarkan (comics), a fictional Hunnic warrior created by Turkish cartoonist Sezgin Burak
- Tarkhan (Punjab), a social group with origins in India living in Pakistan and north of India
- Tarkhan dynasty or Turkhan dynasty, a dynasty established by the Turkic Tarkhan ruling Sindh, Pakistan from 1554 to 1591
- Tarkhan (Egypt), an ancient Egyptian site and necropolis
- Tarkan (album), 1999 compilation album by the Turkish singer Tarkan
