= Moti Kirschenbaum =

Israeli television presenter

- מוטי קירשנבאום
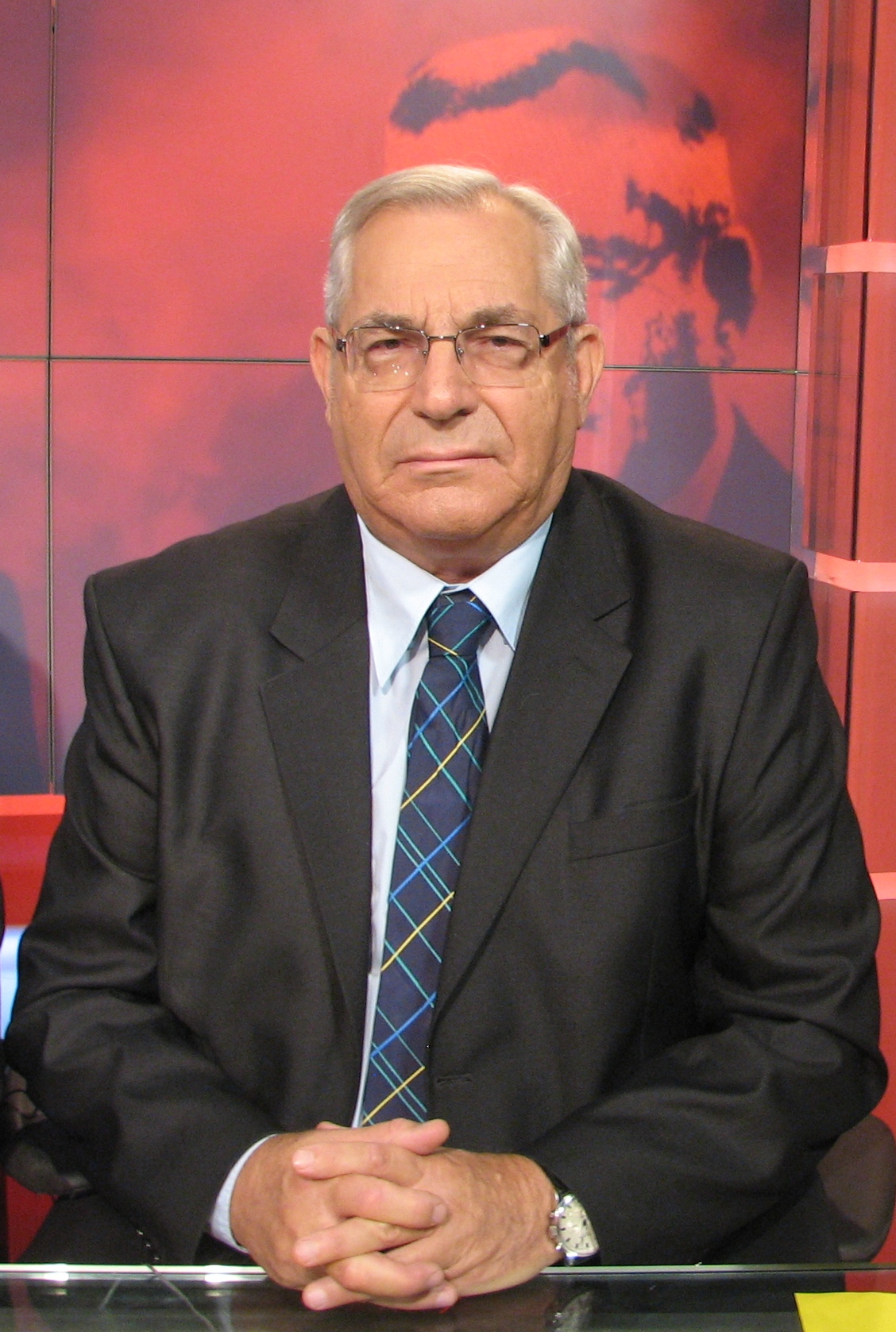
- Kirschenbaum on studio, 2011
- Born: September 24, 1939; Kfar Saba, Mandatory Palestine
- Died: September 25, 2015 (aged 76); Mikhmoret, Israel
- Education: University of California, Los Angeles
- Occupations: Television presenter, filmmaker
- Notable credit(s): Channel 1 (Israel); Channel 10 (Israel)
- Children: 4

Mordechai (Moti) Kirschenbaum (Hebrew: מרדכי "מוטי" קירשנבאום; September 24, 1939 – September 25, 2015) was an Israeli media personality and documentarian.

== Biography ==
Kirschenbaum was born in Kfar Saba in 1939. He studied in Pardes Hanna Agricultural High School. He served in the parachuted Nahal unit of the IDF. From 1962 to 1968 he studied film and television in UCLA.

He was a staff member of the Israeli television from its inception in May 1968, and was editor of "Mabat" ("Glance"), its news program, during its first three years. He directed several documentaries, and produced and edited several television programs (including "Lo HaKol Over" and Nikui Rosh ("Head Cleaning")). He also directed satirical theater productions, including sketches for HaGashash HaHiver. He wrote and directed approximately 120 reports for the "Yoman" ("Diary") television program. From 1976 to 1979 he managed Channel One's program division.

In the late 1980s he quit his permanent work in the Israel Broadcasting Authority (IBA) and established a video production company, Anat, which produced industrial promotion films, mostly for ISCAR Metalworking. He continued to make reports for Yoman and also wrote a weekly column for Yediot Aharonot.

In 1993 he was appointed CEO of the IBA, a position he held until his retirement in 1998. In 2003, he began co-hosting the current affairs program "London & Kirschenbaum" with Yaron London on Channel Ten. In 2008, they both signed for two more years.

Kirschenbaum died on September 25, 2015, one day after his 76th birthday. He was a widower, and had four children. He lived in Mikhmoret until his death.

== Awards ==
- In 1976, Kirschenbaum was awarded the Israel Prize in the "art of radio, television and cinema", primarily in recognition of his television.
- In 2009, Kirschenbaum received the Lifetime Achievement Award from the Israeli Reporters Society.
- In 2012, Kirschenbaum received the Lifetime Achievement Award in the Israeli Academy for Television and Cinema Award Ceremony.
