= Şebnem Ferah =

Turkish rock singer

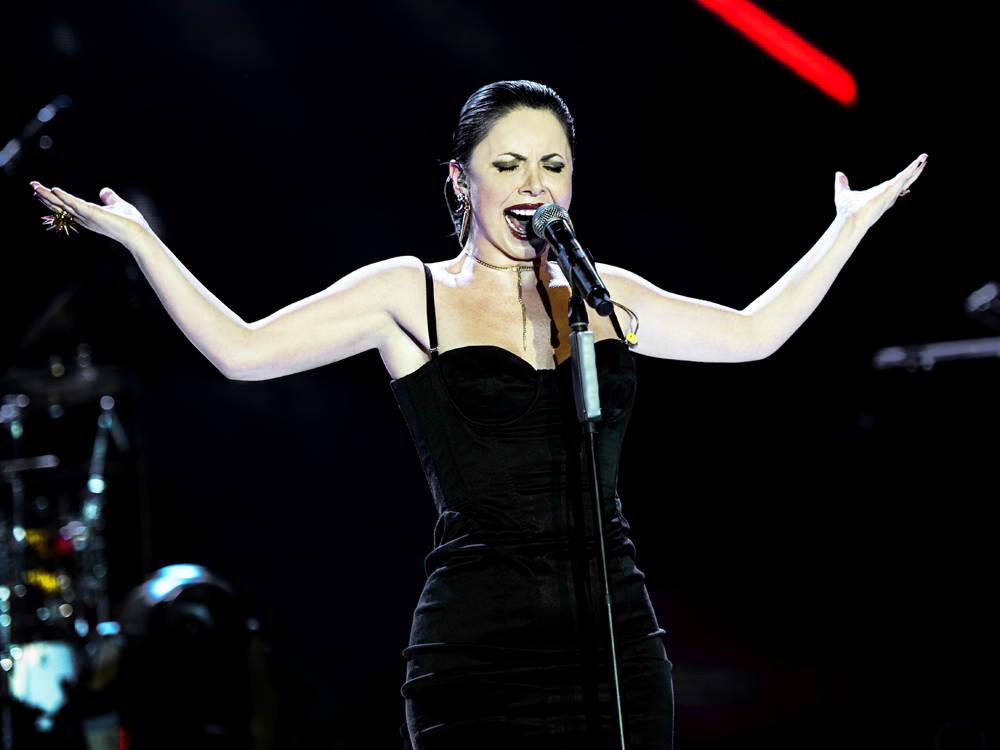

Background information
- Born: 12 April 1972 (age 54); Yalova, Turkey
- Genres: Alternative rock, hard rock, alternative metal, symphonic metal, pop rock
- Occupations: Singer, songwriter, composer, guitarist
- Instruments: Vocals, electric guitar, mandolin, keyboard
- Years active: 1987–present
- Labels: Raks, Universal, Pasaj

Şebnem Ferah (born 12 April 1972) is a Turkish singer, songwriter, composer, and guitarist. She was the lead vocalist of the all-female hard rock band Volvox until 1994, after which she went on to pursue an illustrious solo career. Her music style varies from pop rock to hard rock though her later albums have progressively incorporated more of the hard rock sound.

== Early life and Volvox ==
Şebnem Ferah was born on 12 April 1972 in Yalova to ethnic Turkish immigrant parents from Skopje, Yugoslavia. She first took solfeggio and instrumental lessons from her father who was also a teacher. She grew up listening to her father's Rumelian folk songs played with bağlama, mandolin and piano.

She got her first guitar when she was in the first year in boarding at Namık Sözeri Highschool of Bursa. She got acoustic lessons. During her second year, she hired a studio with her friends and formed the group Pegasus. The group had their first stage appearance during a rock festival in Bursa, in 1987. After a while, Pegasus disbanded. In 1988, Şebnem formed Volvox with four friends of hers that they named after the microorganism known as volvox, which they encountered in a biology lesson.

After graduating from high school, she attended Middle East Technical University, studying economics, and moved to Ankara with her sister. During this time, she met Özlem Tekin, who has later become another recognized pop-rock musician in Turkey, and Özlem joined Volvox. Volvox could not practice for a year and a half because the members experienced a hardship with coming together, with the other members except Özlem and Şebnem living in Istanbul. In her second year at the university, Şebnem changed her mind about being an economist; instead she dropped out and moved back to Istanbul.

In Istanbul, she attended classes on English language and literature at the Istanbul University. For two years she performed in various bars with Volvox until dissolution of the band in 1994.

== Solo career ==
After the dissolution of the all-female rock band Volvox in the early 1990s, Şebnem Ferah began focusing on her solo career. Although short-lived, Volvox gave Ferah attention from professionals. Turkish diva Sezen Aksu and Aksu's writing/recording partner Onno Tunç saw Volvox on television. In a short time, Ferah sang back vocals for Sezen Aksu.

In 1996 Ferah released her first album Kadın (Woman), which contained some of her best known songs, including Vazgeçtim Dünyadan (I Gave up on the World), Yağmurlar (Rains), Bu Aşk Fazla Sana (This Love Is Too Much for You), and Fırtına (Storm). They featured polished production from producer İskender Paydaş. These recordings came off much differently from how she would later perform the songs live. Kadın was a hit and many club and arena gigs followed its release. In 1998, she provided the singing voice of Ariel for the Turkish dubbing of The Little Mermaid.

Three years after her debut album, Ferah released her second album, Artık Kısa Cümleler Kuruyorum(1999). Continuing her collaboration with İskender Paydaş and musicians from the band Pentagram/Mezarkabul, she reduced the use of synthesized sounds in favor of a darker and heavier rock-oriented approach. Personal loss, including the death of her sister prior to the album’s release, influenced its emotional tone. While the album featured fewer mainstream-oriented songs, it contributed to the development of a dedicated fanbase.

In 2001, Ferah released her third studio album, Perdeler, which leaned toward a more acoustic music. The album followed the death of her father during the 1999 İzmit earthquake. Aside from the lead single "Sigara", Perdeler produced limited chart success. The album also included a collaboration with the Finnish cello metal band Apocalyptica on the title track.

Her next step was the fourth album, Kelimeler Yetse, was released in 2003. The album continued her exploration of introspective themes and featured songs such as "Ben Şarkımı Söylerken" and "Mayın Tarlası".

In 2005, she released her fifth studio album Can Kırıkları, produced by Tarkan Gözübüyük. The album showcased her heavier side and was her most distorted recording. After her nationwide concert tour, a live CD/DVD 10 Mart 2007 Istanbul Konseri was released in 2007.

In December 2009, she released her sixth studio album Benim Adım Orman (My Name is Forest), features slow rock songs like Bazı Aşklar (Some Loves) and Eski (Old) while there were hard rock songs like, Merhaba (Hello) and Mahalle (Neighborhood). This album indicates her point of view for rock music.

On 12 April 2018, she released her latest album, Parmak İzi (Fingerprint). It features the title track Koridor (Corridor).

== Live performances ==
- Kadın Album Tour (1997)
- Artık Kısa Cümleler Kuruyorum Album Tour (1999)
- Fanta Tour (2002, 2003, 2010 and 2013)
- Coca-Cola Soundwave Tour (2006)
- Istanbul Concert (2007) (with İstanbul Symphonic Project)
- KoçFest (2007 and 2008)
- Benim Adım Orman Album Tour (2010)
- Turkey Tour (2011)
- Vodafone Free Zone Tour (2011, 2012 and 2013)

== Discography ==
| Year | Released | Album | Songs |
|---|---|---|---|
| 1996 | 23 November 1996 | Kadın; Woman | 1. Vazgeçtim Dünyadan (I Gave Up on the World); 2. Deli Kızım Uyan (Wake Up My Lonely Girl); 3. İyi Gün Dostlarım (My Fair-Weather Friends); 4. Bu Aşk Fazla Sana (This Love Is Too Much for You); 5. Bırak Kadının Olayım (Let Me Be Your Woman); 6. Fırtına (Storm); 7. Yağmurlar (Rain); 8. Yeniden Doğup Gelsem (If I Were Born Again); 9. Durma (Don't Stop); 10. Buradan Göçerken (While Departing from Here); 11. Yağmurlar [Enstrümantal] (Rains [Instrumental]) |
| 1999 | 6 July 1999 | Artık Kısa Cümleler Kuruyorum; I Form Short Sentences Now | 1. Oyunlar (Tricks); 2. Ay (Moon); 3. Bugün (Today); 4. Kalbim (My Heart); 5. Herkes Bilsin İstedim (I Wanted Everyone To Know); 6. Oyunun Sonu (End of the Game); 7. Üvey (Step); 8. Nefessiz Kaldım (I'm Breathless); 9. Yorgun (Tired); 10. Artık Kısa Cümleler Kuruyorum (I Form Short Sentences Now); 11. Bugün [Enstrümantal] (Today [Instrumental]) |
| 2001 | 18 October 2001 | Perdeler; Curtains | 1. Sigara (Cigarette); 2. Aşk (Love); 3. Sil Baştan (Start Over); 4. Nereye Kadar (Until Where); 5. Perdeler (Curtains); 6. Günaydın Sevgilim (Good Morning My Darling); 7. Dünya (The World); 8. Saatim Çalmadan (Before My Clock Rings); 9. Korkarak Yaşıyorsan (If You Live With Fear); 10. Perdeler [featuring Apocalyptica] (Curtains); 11. Yemen Türküsü [Hidden Track] (Yemen Ballad) |
| 2003 | 24 April 2003 | Kelimeler Yetse; If Words Were Enough | 1. İyi – Kötü [Dans Pisti] (Good – Evil [Dance Floor]); 2. Babam Oğlum (My Father, My Son); 3. Ben Şarkımı Söylerken (While I'm Singing My Song); 4. Senin Adın Ne (What Is Your Name); 5. Gözlerimin Etrafındaki Çizgiler (The Lines Around My Eyes); 6. Çocukken Sahip Olduğum Kırmızı Rugan Ayakkabılar (The Red Leather Shoes I Had as a Child); 7. Mayın Tarlası (Minefield); 8. Gözyaşlarımızın Tadı Aynı (Our Tears Taste the Same); 9. Daha İyi Olmaz Mıydı (Wouldn't It Be Better); 10. Her Şey İnsanlar İçin (Everything Is for People) |
| 2005 | 21 June 2005 | Can Kırıkları; The Shards of Heart | 1. Okyanus (Ocean); 2. Can Kırıkları (The Shards of Heart); 3. Bir Kalp Kırıldığında (When A Heart is Broken); 4. Delgeç (Drill); 5. Geçmişe Yolculuk (Journey to the Past); 6. Ben Bir Mülteciyim (Güç) (I'm A Refugee [Power]); 7. Sana Bilmediğin Bir Şey Söyleyemem (I Can't Tell You Anything That You Don't Know); 8. Çakıl Taşları (Pebbles); 9. Zaman Geçip Gidiyor (Time Goes On); 10. Hoşçakal (Goodbye) |
| 2007 | 7 September 2007 | 10 Mart 2007 İstanbul Konseri; 10 March 2007 Istanbul Concert | 1. Intro; 2. Okyanus (Ocean); 3. Can Kırıkları (The Shards of Heart); 4. Çakıl Taşları (Pebbles); 5. Delgeç (Drill); 6. Ay (Moon); 7. Ben Şarkımı Söylerken (While I'm Singing My Song); 8. Babam Oğlum (My Father, My Son); 9. Mayın Tarlası (Minefield); 10. İyi – Kötü (Dans Pisti) (Good – Evil [Dance Floor]); 11. Sigara (Cigarette); 12. Dünya (The World); 13. Bugün (Today); 14. Sil Baştan (Start Over); 15. Oyunun Sonu (End of the Game); 16. Yağmurlar (Rain); 17. Deli Kızım Uyan (Wake Up My Loony Girl); 18. Yeniden Doğup Gelsem (If I Were Born Again); 19. Ben Bir Mülteciyim (I'm a Refugee); 20. Fırtına (Storm); 21. Hoşçakal (Goodbye); 22. Vazgeçtim Dünyadan (I've Given Up on the World); 23. Bu Aşk Fazla Sana (This Love Is Too Much For You); 24. Outro |
| 2009 | 16 December 2009 | Benim Adım Orman; My Name is Forest | 1. Merhaba (Hello); 2. Benim Adım Orman (My Name is Forest); 3. Yalnız (Alone); 4. İstiklal Caddesi Kadar (As much as İstiklal Caddesi); 5. Eski (Old); 6. Mahalle (Neighbourhood); 7. Ateşe Yakın (Close to Fire); 8. Serapmış (It was a Mirage); 9. İnsanlık (Humanity); 10. Bazı Aşklar (Some Love); 11. Uçurtma (The Kite); 12. Eski 2 (Old 2) |
| 2013 | 9 May 2013 | Od; Fire (sales: 40,000) | 1. Kalbim Mezar (My Heart is Grave); 2. Birileri Var (There is Someone); 3. Od (Fire); 4. Savaş Boyası (The Paint of War); 5. Bin Yıldır (For A Thousand Years); 6. Ya Hep Ya Hiç (All or Nothing); 7. Utangaç (Shy); 8. Yarım (Half); 9. Girdap (Whirlpool); 10. Çok Yorgunum (So Tired) |
| 2018 | 12 April 2018 | Parmak İzi; Fingerprint | 1. Şarkılar Yalan Söylemez (Songs Don't Lie); 2. Başka Bir Yol Var (There is Another Way); 3. Koridor (Corridor); 4. Küllerinden (From Your Ashes); 5. Vicdan (Conscience); 6. Son Tango (Last Tango); 7. Parmak İzi (Fingerprint); 8. Sözde Namus (So-called Honour); 9. Kıramazsın (You Can't Break); 10. Koyu (Dark) |

== Backing band ==
Throughout her solo career, Şebnem Ferah has performed with a rotating group of musicians who have contributed to her studio recordings and live performances. The members of her backing band have included:

- Metin Türkcan – lead guitar
- Aykan İlkan – bass guitar
- Volkan Öktem – drums
- Ozan Tügen – keyboards
- Kerem Kabadayı – drums (earlier period)

=== Tours ===
Şebnem Ferah has conducted several concert tours throughout her solo career, primarily in Turkey, following the release of her studio albums.

- Kadın Tour (1997–1998) – Promotional tour after Kadın album.
- Artık Kısa Cümleler Kuruyorum Tour (1999–2000) – Nationwide tour supporting her second studio album.
- Perdeler Tour (2001–2002) – Tour featuring a more acoustic-oriented setlist.
- Kelimeler Yetse Tour (2003–2004) – Concert tour accompanying the release of Kelimeler Yetse.
- Can Kırıkları Tour (2005–2007) – Extended nationwide tour, followed by the release of the live CD/DVD 10 Mart 2007 İstanbul Konseri.
- Benim Adım Orman Tour (2009–2011) – Tour supporting her sixth studio album.
- Parmak İzi Tour (2018–2019) – Tour following the release of Parmak İzi.
