= İstanbul Plak =

- Company type: Private
- Industry: Music & Entertainment
- Founded: 1963
- Headquarters: Istanbul, Turkey
- Key people: Mustafa Söğütoğlu; Mehmet Söğütoğlu founders
- Products: Music & Entertainment
- Website: Official site

İstanbul Plak is a music publishing company of Turkey, established in 1963 and based in Unkapanı, Istanbul.

== Contracted artists ==
=== Current artists ===
As of 13 September 2019

- Özlem Tekin
- Mirkelam
- Sertan
- Tarkan
- Ümit Sayın
- Zeynep Dizdar

=== Notable artists ===
As of 13 September 2019

- Ajda Pekkan
- Azize Gencebay
- Cengiz İmren
- Ebru Gündeş
- Edip Akbayram
- Erkin Koray
- Ertuğ
- İzzet Altınmeşe
- Metin Arolat
- Mine Koşan
- Nalan Tokyürek a.k.a. "Of Aman Nalan"
- Orhan Gencebay
- Osman Bayşu
- Salim Dündar
- Sevim Emre
- Teoman
