= Holly Valance discography =

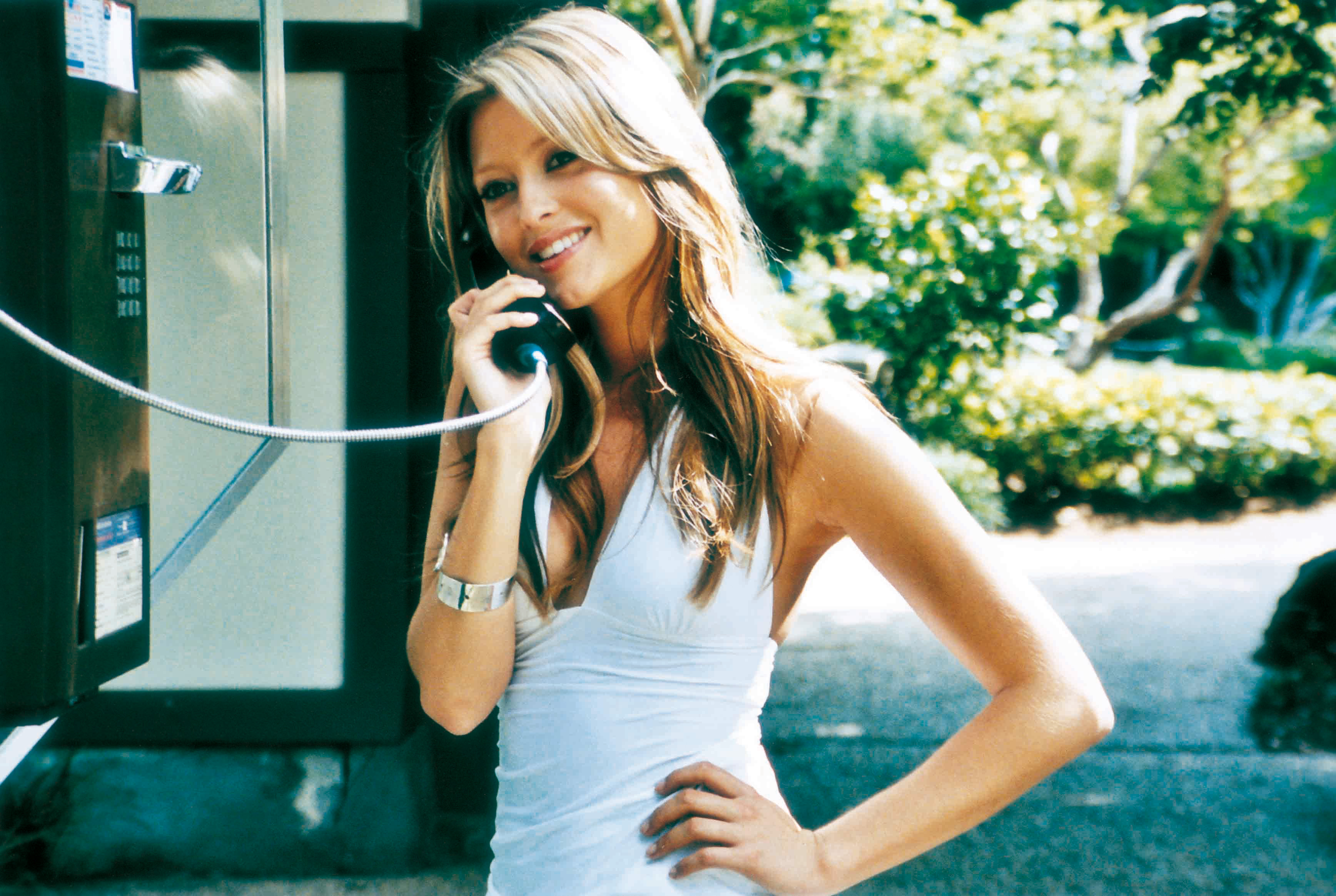
- Valance in 2006
- Studio albums: 2
- Singles: 6
- Music videos: 6

The discography of Holly Valance, an Australian singer, consists of two studio albums, six singles, six music videos and other album appearances.

== Studio albums ==
List of studio albums, with selected chart positions and certifications
Title	Album details	Peak chart positions			Certifications
Title	Album details	AUS	JPN	UK	Certifications
Footprints	Released: 14 October 2002; Label: London; Formats: CD	15	19	9	BPI: Gold; RIAJ: Gold
State of Mind	Released: 6 November 2003; Label: London; Formats: CD	57	12	60	RIAJ: Gold

== Singles ==
List of singles, with selected chart positions and certifications, showing year released and album name
Title	Year	Peak chart positions										Certifications	Album
Title	Year	AUS	AUT	FIN	GER	IRE	ITA	NLD	NZ	SWE	UK	Certifications	Album
"Kiss Kiss"	2002	1	11	11	14	2	3	24	17	12	1	ARIA: Platinum; BPI: Gold	Footprints
"Down Boy"	2002	3	—	—	61	8	11	34	35	—	2	ARIA: Gold	Footprints
"Naughty Girl"	2002	3	56	—	52	25	27	39	—	50	16	ARIA: Gold	Footprints
"State of Mind"	2003	14	—	16	—	27	41	—	—	—	8		State of Mind
"Hopeless" (with Andy Clockwise)	2014	—	—	—	—	—	—	—	—	—	—		Dancing World
"Kiss Kiss (XX) My Arse"	2026	—	—	—	—	—	—	—	—	—	— (Note: "Kiss Kiss (XX) My Arse" did not enter the UK Singles Chart but debuted at number 34 on the UK Singles Downloads Chart, on 6 February 2026.)		Non-album single
"—" denotes releases that did not chart or were not released in that territory.

== Guest appearances ==
List of non-single guest appearances, with other performing artists, showing year released and album name
Title	Year	Other artist(s)	Album
"DUI"	2004	Har Mar Superstar	The Handler
"Back the Camel Up"	2004	Har Mar Superstar	The Handler
"Body Request"	2004	Har Mar Superstar	The Handler
"Hopeless"	2017	Andy Clockwise	Dancing World

== Music videos ==
List of music videos, showing year released and director
Year	Title	Director	Album
2002	"Kiss Kiss"	Tim Royes	Footprints
2002	"Down Boy"	Tim Royes	Footprints
2002	"Naughty Girl"	Jake Nava	Footprints
2003	"State of Mind"	Jake Nava	State of Mind
2014	"Hopeless" (Andy Clockwise featuring Holly Valance)	Stephen Reynolds	Dancing World
2026	"Kiss Kiss (XX) My Arse"	N/A	Non-album single

=== Guest appearances ===
List of videos, showing year and artist
Year	Title	Artist
2000	"He Don't Love You"	Human Nature
2009	"Confusion Girl"	Frankmusik
