= State of Mind =

State of Mind may refer to:

== Film and television ==
- A State of Mind (film), a 2004 British documentary film
- State of Mind (film), or Three Christs, a 2017 American drama film
- State of Mind (TV series), a 2007 American comedy drama television series
- State of Mind, a 2003 British television miniseries, also compiled as a film, starring Niamh Cusack
- "State of Mind" (The Jeffersons), a 1985 television episode
- "A State of Mind" (Knots Landing), a 1981 television episode

== Music ==
=== Groups ===
- State of Mind (band), a New Zealand drum and bass duo
- A State of Mind (band), a German hip hop act

=== Albums ===
- State of Mind (Citizen Zero album), or the title song, 2016
- State of Mind (Commissioned album), 1990
- State of Mind (Elegy album), or the title song, 1997
- State of Mind (Front Line Assembly album), 1988
- State of Mind (Holly Valance album), or the title song (see below), 2003
- State of Mind (Hunter Brothers album), 2019
- State of Mind (Psycho Motel album), 1995
- State of Mind (Raul Midón album), or the title song, 2005
- A State of Mind (album), by E.M.D., 2008
- State of Mind (EP), or the title song, by Dizzy Wright, 2014
- State of Mind EP, by Clockwork Radio, or the title song, 2010
- State of Mind, by the Faim, 2019
- State of Mind, by Kary Ng, 2014
- State of Mind, by Lovex, 2013
- State of Mind, by Wave, 2002

=== Songs ===
- "State of Mind" (Clint Black song), 1993
- "State of Mind" (Fish song), 1989
- "State of Mind" (Holly Valance song), 2003
- "State of Mind", by Electric Light Orchestra from Zoom, 2001
- "State of Mind", by Goldie from Timeless, 1995
- "State of Mind", by Jack Lucien from Everything I Want to Be, 2011
- "State of Mind", by Mad Caddies from Keep It Going, 2007
- "State of Mind", by Suzi Quatro from Rock Hard, 1981
- "State of Mind", by Tkay Maidza from Tkay, 2016

== Other uses ==
- Mental state, a state of mind of a person
- State of Mind (video game), a 2018 graphic adventure game
- Jefferson (proposed Pacific state), nicknamed State of Mind
- States of Mind, a 1911 trilogy of paintings by Umberto Boccioni

== See also ==
- Altered state of consciousness, any condition which is significantly different from a normal waking state
- Frame of Mind (disambiguation)
