= List of people from Kettering =

This is a list of notable people who were born in or have been residents of the town of Kettering, in the county of Northamptonshire, England.

== Academia ==
- Maurice Kendall, statistician, widely known for his contribution to statistics
- Henry Nettleship, classical scholar
- Dame Sarah Gilbert, Saïd Professor of Vaccinology at the University of Oxford

== Entertainment ==
- James Acaster, comedian
- Robert Ames, conductor and violist, co-artistic director and co-principal conductor of the London Contemporary Orchestra
- David Armand, comedian, actor and writer
- Jayne Conneely, DJane, record producer, co-founder and former manager of the record label Metalheadz
- Hugh Dennis, comedian, actor, writer, impressionist and voice-over artist
- Sienna Guillory, actress and former model
- David Hawthorne, stage and film actor
- Jim King, original member of the British rock band Family
- Jack Lucien, British-born Andorran singer, music producer, and songwriter, best known for his 2009 single "I'm Not Afraid"
- Valerie Olukemi A "Kemi" Olusanya, DJane, record producer, co-founder and former manager of the record label Metalheadz
- Horace Panter, bassist for the 2 Tone ska band The Specials
- Russ Russell, record producer, sound engineer, mixer, mastering engineer, musician and writer
- Chris Smith, radio newsreader, most famous for presenting Newsbeat on BBC Radio 1
- Faryl Smith, soprano
- Mae Stephens, singer and songwriter
- Temples, rock band
- Naomi Battrick, actress

== Military ==
- Raymond Lewin, pilot officer of the Royal Air Force Volunteer Reserve (RAFVR), awarded the George Cross for rescuing his co-pilot in 1940 in Malta
- Edward Sismore, air commodore

== Miscellaneous ==
- Michael Kidner, pioneer of op art
- Ron Chippindale, chief inspector of air accidents in charge of the New Zealand Office of Air Accidents Investigations
- Alfred East, painter
- John Alfred Gotch, architect and architectural historian
- Thomas Cooper Gotch, painter and book illustrator loosely associated with the Pre-Raphaelite movement
- Catherine Hall, feminist historian
- Jack Laundon, lichenologist, president of the British Lichen Society
- Edward Nettleship, ophthalmologist
- John Trivett Nettleship, artist known as a painter of animals and in particular lions, he was also an author and book illustrator
- Samuel Perkins Pick, architect strongly associated with Leicestershire, and co-founder of the architecture and civil engineering firm Pick Everard
- Royston (Roy) Warner Wilson (1900-1965), Amalgamated Press comic artist
- Walter Goodfellow, ornithologist

== Politics ==
- Tom Bradley, British politician
- Henry Briggs, Australian politician, member of the Western Australian Legislative Council for 23 years, and its president for 13 years
- Andy Sawford, Labour and Co-operative Party politician
- Phil Sawford, Labour Party politician, who was the member of Parliament (MP) for Kettering from 1997 to 2005

== Religion ==
- Thomas Allen, clergyman and divine
- John Brine, Particular Baptist minister
- Andrew Fuller, Particular Baptist minister and theologian
- John Gill, Baptist pastor, biblical scholar, and theologian
- William Knibb, Baptist minister and missionary to Jamaica, known for his work to free slaves

== Sport ==
- Dermot Bailey, professional wheelchair tennis player
- Daniel Berridge, trampoline gymnast
- Nick Coles, cricketer
- Sean Dyche, former professional footballer, manager of Nottingham Forest F.C., former manager of Burnley Football Club, former manager of Everton F.C.
- Ricky Evans, darts player
- Harry Gouldstone, cricketer
- Charley Hull, professional golfer
- Angela Hunter, international track and road racing cyclist
- Kyren Wilson, snooker player
- Aribim Pepple, professional footballer
- Mohammed Mahe Khan, footballer

== Writer/ journalist ==
- Frank Bellamy, comics artist, best known for his work on the Eagle comic
- J. L. Carr, English novelist, publisher, teacher and eccentric
- Jane E. Clarke, writer of children's books and poetry
- Jill McGown, writer of mystery novels
- Keith Roberts, science fiction author
