= Cut Me Up =

Cut Me Up may refer to:

- "Cut Me Up", a song by Har Mar Superstar from The Handler
- "Cut Me Up", a song by Headstones from Smile and Wave
- "Cut Me Up", a song by Stanton Warriors
- "Cut Me Up Jenny", a song by Taking Back Sunday from New Again
- "Cut Me Up", a song by Miss Alexia
