= State of Mind (Holly Valance album) =

Studio album by Holly Valance
- Released: 6 November 2003
- Studios: 40oz. Sound, Ann Arbor, Michigan; The Chill Building, Santa Monica, California
- Genres: Pop; dance-pop
- Length: 42:07
- Label: London
- Producers: Chris Peters; Drew Peters; Steve Anderson; Mark Taylor; Jeff Taylor; Darren Bennett; Steve Welton-Jaimes; Rick Nowels

Holly Valance chronology
| Footprints (2002) | State of Mind (2003) |

Singles from State of Mind
- 1. "State of Mind" Released: 20 October 2003

Professional ratings
Review scores
| Source | Rating |
|---|---|
| AllMusic | 4.5/5 stars |
| Dotmusic | 4/10 |
| The Guardian | 2/5 stars |
| Stylus Magazine | 4/10 |

State of Mind is the second and final studio album released by Australian singer Holly Valance, released in Japan on 6 November 2003 by London Records. It is a mixture of dance and 1980s electro-pop, some written by Valance herself. The album debuted on the Australian ARIA Albums Chart and the UK Albums Chart at the lower ends of the chart, making it her lowest-selling album. The album's only single, the title track "State of Mind", was a top 20 hit in Australia, Finland and the United Kingdom.

"Desire" was set to be the second single from "State of Mind". The single was scheduled to be released in February 2004, but for unknown reasons, it was never released. Holly Valance later retired from music. In addition to the original version of "Desire", a remix of the song was produced by Manhattan Clique, which has also never been officially released.

== Background and development ==
At the end of 2002, the fourth single taken from the debut album "Footprints" was scheduled to be the song titled "Tuck Your Shirt In". However, due to various reasons, Holly opted to begin working on her second album. In this album, Holly aimed for a complete transformation, expressing her desire to move towards a more mature artistic approach in comparison to her debut work.

In strong contrast to her debut album, Holly took an active role in the development of this project, becoming deeply involved in both the sonic development of the album and the composition of its lyrics. Holly helped to co-write more than forty songs. For the album's lead single, titled "State of Mind", Holly found inspiration in the influences of 80's rock and electronic-dance music.

The album's genre, electropop, differs slightly from Valance's previous album Footprints (2002), She stated, "It's kind of different 'cos at the time I was listening to rock, I was listening to dance and lots of electro and I loved them all equally. I thought[,] what would happen if we put them all in a pot and see what happens[? ...] the people I was working with at the time really like[d] that idea. So everyone was working on the same level with the same goals in mind. What we wanted to get out of it was a bit darker, a bit harder. It's a very kind of upbeat record and that's what I like to do."

== Commercial performance ==
State of Mind was a commercial failure, selling considerably less and charting much lower than Valance's previous studio album Footprints.

In her native Australia, the album debuted on the ARIA Albums Chart at number 57 with first week sales of 1,600 copies. The following week the album dropped twenty-three places to number eighty with sales of 998 copies, leaving the chart the following week, spending a total of two weeks on the chart. In the United Kingdom, the album debuted and peaked at number 60 on the issue dated 22 November 2003, with first week copies of 8,000. The album only spent a single week on the chart.

The album was most successful in Japan, debuting on the Japanese Oricon Albums Chart at number twelve with first-week sales of 21,547 copies.

== Track listing ==
Credits adapted from the liner notes of State of Mind.

State of Mind – Standard edition
| No. | Title | Writer(s) | Producer(s) | Length |
|---|---|---|---|---|
| 1. | "Hypnotic" | Lisa Greene; Steve Anderson; Steve Lee | Anderson | 3:45 |
| 2. | "State of Mind" | Mark Taylor; Jeff Taylor; Steve Torch | M. Taylor; J. Taylor | 3:20 |
| 3. | "Everything I Hate" | Holly Valance; Chris Peters; Drew Peters | C. Peters; D. Peters | 3:27 |
| 4. | "Desire" | Adam Phillips; J. Taylor; M. Taylor | M. Taylor; J. Taylor | 3:37 |
| 5. | "Curious" | Alan Bremner; Greene; Anderson; Lee | Anderson | 3:10 |
| 6. | "Ricochets" | C. Peters; D. Peters | C. Peters; D. Peters | 3:42 |
| 7. | "Roll Over" | Valance; Anderson; Lee | Anderson | 3:21 |
| 8. | "Tongue-Tied" | Valance; C. Peters; D. Peters | C. Peters; D. Peters | 4:03 |
| 9. | "Over 'n' Out" | Joanne Jeffries; Juliette Jaimes; Steve Welton-Jaimes | Darran Bennett; Steve Welton-Jaimes | 3:12 |
| 10. | "Somebody Out There" | C. Peters; D. Peters | C. Peters; D. Peters | 3:58 |
| 11. | "Action" | Valance; Tom Nichols; Rick Nowels; Billy Steinberg | Nowels; Steinberg^{[a]}; Nichols^{[a]} | 3:33 |
| 12. | "Double Take" | C. Peters; D. Peters | C. Peters; D. Peters | 2:59 |
| Total length: | | | | 42:07 |

State of Mind – Japan deluxe edition (bonus tracks)
| No. | Title | Writer(s) | Producer(s) | Length |
|---|---|---|---|---|
| 13. | "Just Like Me" | Black; Stuart Crichton; Valance | Crichton | 3:33 |
| 14. | "Please Please Me" | Craig Hardy; Jaimes; Mick Lister; Valance | Darran Bennett; Steve Welton-Jaimes | 3:31 |

State of Mind – Japan deluxe edition DVD
| No. | Title | Length |
|---|---|---|
| 1. | "State of Mind" (music video) | 3:21 |
| 2. | "Kiss Kiss" (music video) | 3:25 |
| 3. | "Down Boy" (music video) | 3:24 |
| 4. | "Naughty Girl" (music video) | 3:22 |

Notes

- ^{^a} signifies a co-producer

== Charts ==
Chart performance for State of Mind
| Chart (2003) | Peak position |
|---|---|
| Australian Albums (ARIA) | 57 |
| Japanese Albums (Oricon) | 12 |
| UK Albums (Official Charts) | 60 |

== Release history ==
Release history for State of Mind
| Region | Date | Label | Format | Catalog |
|---|---|---|---|---|
| Japan | 6 November 2003 | London | CD | WPCR-11722 |
| Australia | 10 November 2003 | EngineRoom | CD | ERM0019 |
| United Kingdom | 14 November 2003 | London | CD | 5046701625 |
