= Bye Bye 17 =

Studio album by Har Mar Superstar
- Released: April 23, 2013
- Studio: Public Hi-Fi
- Genre: Soul, pop
- Length: 28:32
- Label: Cult Records
- Producer: Sean Tillman, Jim Eno

Har Mar Superstar chronology
Dark Touches (2009)	Bye Bye 17 (2013)	Best Summer Ever (2016)

Singles from Bye Bye 17
- 1. "Prisoner" Released: May 7, 2013

Bye Bye 17 is the fifth solo studio album by Har Mar Superstar. It was released via Cult Records on April 23, 2013. It peaked at number 15 on the Billboard Heatseekers Albums chart. Music videos were created for "Lady, You Shot Me", "Prisoner", and "Restless Leg".

== Production ==
Most of the songs on Bye Bye 17 were written in 2011 after Har Mar Superstar moved from Los Angeles to New York City. It is the first Har Mar Superstar album that he wrote primarily on guitar. He said, "I wanted the album to sound really live, old, and futuristic." In concert, he developed the material from the album. Recorded at Public Hi-Fi in Austin, Texas, it was co-produced with Jim Eno.

== Critical reception ==
Professional ratings
Aggregate scores
Source	Rating
Metacritic	60/100
Review scores
Source	Rating
AllMusic	3.5/5 stars
Bust	5/5 stars
The Current	favorable
Filter	83/100
PopMatters	4/10 stars

At Metacritic, which assigns a weighted average score out of 100 to reviews from mainstream critics, the album received an average score of 60% based on 10 reviews, indicating "mixed or average reviews".

Gregory Heaney of AllMusic gave the album 3.5 stars out of 5, calling it "an album of straight-up soul-pop that once again shows that beneath his greasy exterior, Har Mar Superstar has the heart of a soul man."

== Track listing ==
No.	Title	Length
1.	"Lady, You Shot Me"	3:01
2.	"Prisoner"	3:24
3.	"Everywhere I'm Local"	2:51
4.	"Restless Leg"	3:36
5.	"12:12"	2:22
6.	"We Don't Sleep"	3:18
7.	"WWW"	2:11
8.	"Rhythm Bruises"	3:14
9.	"Don't Make Me Hit You"	2:34
10.	"Late Night Morning Light"	2:06

== Charts ==
Chart	Peak position
French Albums (SNEP)	183
US Heatseekers Albums (Billboard)	15
