= You Can Feel Me =

Studio album by Har Mar Superstar
- Released: October 22, 2002
- Genre: R&B, indie rock
- Length: 29:33
- Label: Record Collection
- Producer: Har Mar Superstar, Eric Olsen

Har Mar Superstar chronology
| Har Mar Superstar (2000) | You Can Feel Me (2002) | The Handler (2004) |

Singles from You Can Feel Me
- 1. "Power Lunch" Released: 2002; 2. "EZ Pass" Released: 2003

You Can Feel Me is the second solo studio album by Har Mar Superstar. It was released via Record Collection in 2002. Produced and recorded by Eric Olsen, it features guest appearances from Clark Baechle, Jacob Thiele, Broken Spindles, Busy Signals, Dirty Preston, and Beth Ditto. It peaked at number 93 on the UK Albums Chart. The album release show was held at First Avenue.

== Critical reception ==
Professional ratings
Aggregate scores
| Source | Rating |
|---|---|
| Metacritic | 61/100 |
Review scores
| Source | Rating |
| AllMusic | 3/5 stars |
| The A.V. Club | favorable |
| The Guardian | 5/5 stars |
| NME | 4.5/5 stars |
| PItchfork | 2.0/10 |
| PopMatters | favorable |

At Metacritic, which assigns a weighted average score out of 100 to reviews from mainstream critics, You Can Feel Me received an average score of 61% based on 11 reviews, indicating "generally favorable reviews".

Erik Hage of AllMusic gave the album 3 stars out of 5, calling it "a darn fine R&B album" and "a genuinely funky, finely produced album that often bypasses white b-boy cheekiness." Andy Hermann of PopMatters said, "[Har Mar Superstar is] the Adam Sandler of funk, almost magically capable of being crass and endearing at the same time."

== Track listing ==
| No. | Title | Length |
|---|---|---|
| 1. | "Intro" | 0:51 |
| 2. | "Power Lunch" | 2:49 |
| 3. | "Elephant Walk" | 2:34 |
| 4. | "We Could Be Heavy" | 2:36 |
| 5. | "You Can Feel Me" | 3:13 |
| 6. | "H.A.R.M.A.R." | 2:59 |
| 7. | "One Dirty Minute" | 1:21 |
| 8. | "No Chorus" | 1:38 |
| 9. | "Let's Get This Party Kickin'" | 2:52 |
| 10. | "Freedom Summer" | 2:42 |
| 11. | "Love Jam No. 1" | 3:03 |
| 12. | "EZ Pass" | 2:55 |

== Charts ==
| Chart | Peak position |
|---|---|
| UK Albums (OCC) | 93 |
