= New 80s Musik =

Studio album by Jack Lucien
- Released: 15 June 2008 (Spain, France); 28 July 2008 (UK)
- Recorded: Tallinn, Estonia; United Kingdom; 2007
- Genre: Pop, Europop
- Length: 36:06
- Label: Unconditional Records
- Producer: Jack Lucien, Barker, Eplik

Jack Lucien chronology
What You Said to Me... EP (2006)	New 80s Musik (2008)	EuroSceptic (2009)

New 80s Musik is the debut album of British singer Jack Lucien. It did not chart in the United Kingdom and briefly appeared on the charts in France and Spain.

According to ASCAP, all songs were written or co-written by Lucien. Gone Before It Happens was written by Lucien back in 2004 when his name was Hun.

Since the release of the album, Jack Lucien has shown his dissatisfaction with the album, saying in his blogs in 2009 that "it belongs in the bargain bin" and that First Sign of Life is his least favourite song.

== Track listing ==
No.	Title	Writer(s)	{{{extra_column}}}	Length
1.	"New 80s Musik FM"	Lucien		0:32
2.	"Photos"	Lucien		3:31
3.	"Rasputin"	Lucien, Eplik		5:04
4.	"Hypertension"	Lucien, Barker		3:30
5.	"First Sign of Life"	Lucien, Eplik	Wilkins, Kipner	3:43
6.	"More Than Real"	Lucien		3:56
7.	"You and I"	Lucien		5:27
8.	"Electric Voice"	Lucien		0:38
9.	"D.t.D"	Lucien, Barker		3:35
10.	"No One Knows Me"	Lucien, Barker		2:56
11.	"Gone Before It Happens"	Hun		4:42

=== Singles ===
1. "Gone Before It Happens" (performed as Hun) [12 July 2004)
2. "Photos" (promo only) [21 April 2008]
3. "Rasputin" [2 June 2008]
