= Holly Valance =

Australian and British actress, singer, model, and political activist (born 1983)

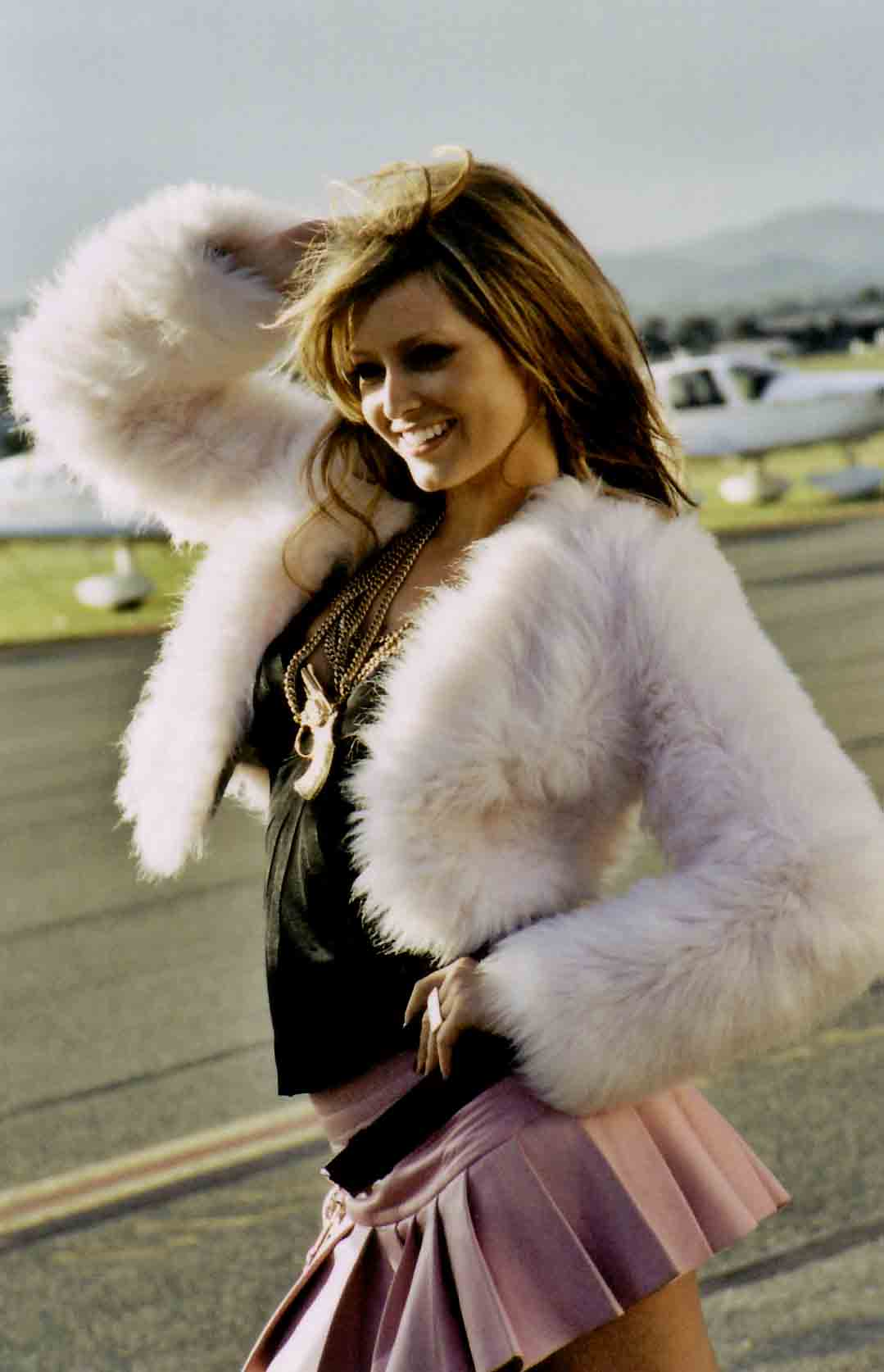
- Valance in 2006, advertising the reverse charges service 1800 Reverse
- Born: Holly Rachel Vukadinović; 11 May 1983 (age 43); Fitzroy, Victoria, Australia
- Citizenship: Australia; United Kingdom
- Occupations: Actress; singer; model; activist
- Years active: 1997–present
- Political party: Reform UK
- Spouse: Nick Candy (m. 2012; sep. 2025)
- Children: 2
- Relatives: Olympia Valance (half-sister)
- Musical career
- Genres: Pop; dance-pop
- Instrument: Vocals
- Label: London

Holly Rachel Vukadinović (born 11 May 1983), known professionally as Holly Valance, is an Australian and British actress, singer, model, and a right-wing political activist and fundraiser.

Valance became well known for her role as Felicity "Flick" Scully on the Australian soap opera Neighbours (1999–2002, 2005, 2022) and later played Nika Volek in Prison Break (2005–2006). Her film roles include DOA: Dead or Alive (2006), National Lampoon's Pledge This! (2006), Taken (2008), and Kambakkht Ishq (2009). Her first album, Footprints (2002), provided three top three singles: "Kiss Kiss", "Down Boy" and "Naughty Girl". The title song of her second and final album, State of Mind (2003), was also a UK top ten single. She was also a contestant on the ninth series of Strictly Come Dancing in 2011.

Since 2024, Valance has become involved in UK and US politics as a prominent supporter and fundraiser for Nigel Farage's Reform UK and Donald Trump's third presidential campaign.

== Early life ==
Holly Valance was born on 11 May 1983, as Holly Rachel Vukadinović, in Fitzroy, Victoria, to a Serb father, Rajko Vukadinović, and a British mother of English and Spanish descent, Rachel (née Stephens), from Southampton. Her father was a former pianist and model in his native Belgrade, Serbia, former Yugoslavia. Her mother, whose father was a relative of comedian Benny Hill, was a model in the United Kingdom. Valance's parents divorced in 1986. Valance has a sister, Coco. Rajko later remarried and Holly has a half-sister, Olympia, who has also acted in Neighbours as Paige Smith (2014–2018, 2020, 2022). In Melbourne Rajko ran a "trendy imported European clothes store".

Valance started modelling as a teenager, when "she posed for supermarket catalogues and ad campaigns and by 14 she was earning $200 an hour modelling children's clothes and teenage lingerie." She grew up in Melbourne and moved to the UK when she was 18; she holds both Australian and British citizenship. After two years she moved to Los Angeles, where she spent seven years before returning to the United Kingdom.

== Career ==
=== 1999–2003: Neighbours and music ===
In 1999 at age 16, Valance was cast in the Australian TV soap opera, Neighbours, as Felicity "Flick" Scully. Soon after gaining the role she left her Catholic school, "where girls were given detention for wearing make-up or having a hem above the knee." She appeared in Human Nature's music video for "He Don't Love You" (November 2000), "in a raunchy shower scene." Valance left Neighbours in 2002 to start her music career. Her first single, released in April 2002, was "Kiss Kiss", an English language cover version of Turkish singer Tarkan's "Şımarık". It entered both the ARIA Singles and UK Singles Charts at No. 1. It charted in the top ten in seventeen countries, and went to number one in North Macedonia. The song was nominated for four ARIA Music Awards in 2002.

Valance's second single, "Down Boy" (September), peaked at No. 2 in the UK and No. 3 in Australia. Her first album, Footprints, was released on 14 October 2002, which reached No. 9 in the UK and No. 15 in Australia. She co-wrote the album track "The Harder They Come" with Rob Davis, who supplied guitar for the album. The album's third and final single, "Naughty Girl", peaked at No. 3 in Australia and No. 16 in the UK. Valance's second album, State of Mind, appeared in November 2003 and its title track was the lead single. It peaked at No. 8 in the UK and at No. 14 in Australia. Valance dropped London Recordings in 2004 and said she was no longer interested in recording music.

=== 2004–2013: Prison Break and films ===
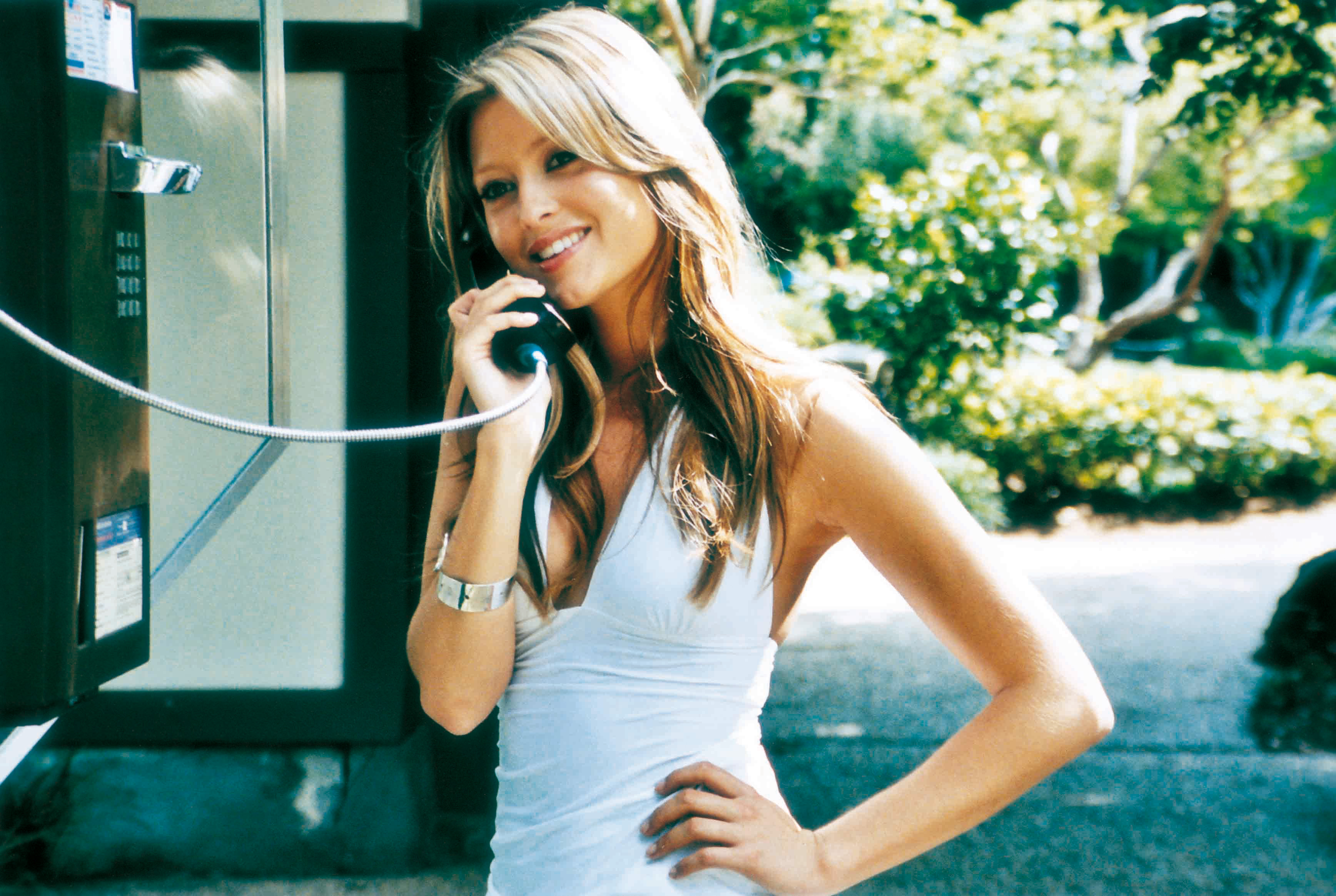
Valance at an airport filming an advert for 1800 Reverse, a reverse charge call service, in 2006

In 2004, Valance returned to acting, this time in the United States, appearing in episodes of the television series CSI: Miami and Entourage. In 2005, she appeared in an episode of CSI: NY. In 2005 Valance returned to music, albeit briefly, when she appeared on Har Mar Superstar's album The Handler singing on the tracks, "DUI", "Back the Camel Up" and "Body Request". She appeared in Prison Break in 2006 as Nika Volek, a role which she continued to portray in the show's second season. Also in 2006, Valance appeared in the National Lampoon comedy Pledge This!, alongside American socialite Paris Hilton. The same year, she starred in DOA: Dead or Alive, an adaptation of the popular video game Dead or Alive, in which she played Christie. In 2007, she appeared in the TV series Shark and Moonlight. In 2008, she had a role in the film Taken alongside Liam Neeson, and appeared in an episode of The CW series Valentine.

In 2009, Valance appeared in Frankmusik's video for his single "Confusion Girl". She also leaked a track called "Superstar" in 2009. In 2009 Valance played Brenda Snow for the video game Command & Conquer: Red Alert 3 – Uprising. She also appeared in Scott Caan's film Mercy. Valance took part in the 2011 series of Strictly Come Dancing, where she was paired with the professional winner of series 8, Artem Chigvintsev. Valance and Chigvintsev were eliminated in the semi-final of the competition on 11 December 2011, giving them a fourth-place finish. She also starred in the Miss Marple television episode called "The Pale Horse". In 2011, Valance appeared in an advert for Foster's Gold bottled beer.

In 2013, Valance was mentor and judge of fashion competition Shopaholic Showdown.

=== 2013–present: Hiatus and other projects ===
In 2013, Valance took a hiatus from her artistic career to prioritise her family, and has since been doing charity work as Ambassador of The Children's Trust, the UK's leading charity for children with brain injury and neurodisability. Since then, her only new role has been an appearance in the movie Red Herring, released in 2015 and shot in 2013. On 28 July 2022, Valance was seen in a cameo appearance as Felicity Scully, in what was intended to be the final-ever Neighbours episode. Her appearance was filmed in the UK alongside that of Natalie Imbruglia's character, Beth Brennan.

Also in 2013, Valance made a series of advertisements for 0800REVERSE, a reverse charge phone service.

In 2025, Valance became a brand ambassador for heritage Australian label, Driza-Bone.

On 26 January 2026, Valance released the single "Kiss Kiss (XX) My Arse" in support of the Australian politician Pauline Hanson's anti-LGBTQ satirical comedy film A Super Progressive Movie. Within hours of the song's release, it reached the number one position on the Australian iTunes songs chart. The song was briefly removed, without explanation, by Apple Music, before being put back up on their websites.

== Personal life ==
From 2005 to 2009, Valance dated Australian actor Alex O'Loughlin. In 2010, she started dating British property developer Nick Candy, whom she married on 29 September 2012 in Beverly Hills, California. The couple have two daughters. The first was born in November 2013, and the second in September 2017. In June 2025, it was reported that Valance and Candy had separated after 13 years of marriage.

=== Political views ===
According to The Guardian in 2024, Valance had "rapidly risen to become radical-right royalty". In February that year, she attended the launch of the new British conservative movement Popular Conservatism, led by former UK Prime Minister Liz Truss. In a series of clips posted on X (formerly known as Twitter), Valance was interviewed by Christopher Hope of GB News, and was asked about her views on various issues. Her view on "the climate crisis or lack of" was that "cleaner, cheaper energy is what we need". Asked about her political views, she said, "I would say that everyone starts off as a leftie and then wakes up at some point after making money, working, trying to run a business, trying to buy a home then realises what crap ideas they all are, and then you go to the right." Valance said her top political priority was Britain leaving the European Convention on Human Rights and the establishment of a British bill of rights, adding that "the trickle-down effect would be a huge step in the right direction".

A close personal friend of Nigel Farage, Valance said she persuaded him to stand for Parliament in the 2024 general election. In a 2024 interview she stated she was a member of Reform UK and would be voting for them in the general election. She said, "I support anybody that sticks to what they believe in and isn't a turncoat, and doesn't do a million flip-flops and U-turns." She helped the party raise £1.5 million within days of Farage's return as leader, and has donated approximately £100,000 herself. In December 2024 it was announced that Valance's husband would become treasurer of Reform UK.

Having previously stayed at Donald Trump's Mar-a-Lago resort, in 2024 Valance became the "UK poster girl" for Trump's US presidential campaign, and co-hosted a large fundraiser in London on 11 June.

In September 2025, Valance attended the Unite the Kingdom protest, and said of the British far-right activist Tommy Robinson: "I'm very proud and pleased for Tommy, this is his redemption."

=== Legal issues ===
In January 2002, Valance dismissed her then-manager Scott Michaelson by telephone, 15 months before his contract was due to expire. In 2003, Michaelson's company sued Valance's company for breach of contract, won the case and was awarded damages by the Supreme Court of New South Wales. During the trial, Valance's mother said Michaelson had been negligent as a manager, which forced her to take over from him. The former Neighbours cast member Kym Valentine also gave evidence that Valance "said she was feeling bad, a bit stressed out, because she was leaving Scott" and that "she said the solicitors for her record company would get her out of the contract and would be faxing him the paper work (from the UK) to do so." In court, Valance denied that she had said this to Valentine, even though she had signed an affidavit stating she had no recollection of the conversation.

Justice Clifford Einstein declared that Valance's company had shown "a calculated disregard of the rights of [Michaelson's company] Biscayne as well as a cynical pursuit of benefit". The court ordered Valance's company to pay Michaelson's company $350,000 including $47,264.56 "from shares Ms Valance and Mr Michaelson had bought together on the London Stock Exchange": Michaelson's application for a percentage of profits from sales of her album State of Mind was denied.

== Filmography ==
=== Film ===
Year	Title	Role	Notes
2006	DOA: Dead or Alive	Christie Allen	
2006	Pledge This!	Jessica	
2008	Taken	Sheerah	
2009	Kambakkht Ishq	Herself	
2010	Luster	Sally	
2011	Surviving Georgia	Rose	
2011	Big Mamma's Boy	Katie	
2015	Red Herring	Angela	

=== Television ===
Year	Title	Role	Notes
1999–2002; 2005; 2022	Neighbours	Felicity Scully	Main role; Episode: "20th Anniversary"; Episode: "The Finale"
2004	CSI: Miami	Kay Coleman	Episode: "Addiction"
2005	Entourage	Leanna	Episode: "My Maserati Does 185"
2005	CSI: NY	Lydia	Episode: "YoungBlood"
2005–2006	Prison Break	Nika Volek	Recurring role (seasons 1–2)
2007	Moonlight	Lola	Episode: "B.C."
2007	Shark	Christina Shaw	Episode: "Every Breath You Take"
2008	Valentine	Vivi Langdon	Episode: "Act Naturally"
2010	Agatha Christie's Marple	Kanga	Episode: "The Pale Horse"
2011	Strictly Come Dancing	Herself	Contestant (season 9)
2013	Shopaholic Showdown	Herself	Judge

=== Video game ===
- Command & Conquer: Red Alert 3 – Uprising (2009), as Brenda Snow (voice role)

== Discography ==
- Footprints (2002)
- State of Mind (2003)

== Awards and nominations ==
Year	Award	Category	Title of work	Result
2000	Logie Award	Most Popular New Talent – Female	Neighbours	Nominated
2002	ARIA Award	Highest Selling Single	"Kiss Kiss"	Nominated
2002	ARIA Award	Best Female Artist	"Kiss Kiss"	Nominated
2002	ARIA Award	Breakthrough Artist – Single	"Kiss Kiss"	Nominated
2002	ARIA Award	Best Pop Release	"Kiss Kiss"	Nominated
2002	MTV Video Music Awards	International Viewers Choice Awards - Australia	"Kiss Kiss"	Won
2003	Disney Channel Kids Awards	Breakthrough Artist		Won
2003	Disney Channel Kids Awards	Best Single	"Kiss Kiss"	Won
