= EuroSceptic =

Studio album by Jack Lucien
- Released: 26 October 2009 (Europe); 8 October 2009 (USA)
- Recorded: Kiev, Ukraine & Moscow, Russia
- Genre: Pop, Europop
- Length: 47:15:00
- Label: Unconditional Records
- Producer: Jack Lucien

Jack Lucien chronology
New 80s Musik (2008)	EuroSceptic (2009)	Everything I Want to Be (2011)

EuroSceptic (originally titled as Paint This City) is the second album of British singer Jack Lucien. It was released in October 2009.

Due to being an album influenced by Europop, it features songs with parts in different languages. Whilst eight of the songs are predominantly in English, "Give Me Your Love" is mostly sung in Spanish and "Sentiments" is sung in Catalan, Spanish, and Portuguese. The middle 8 of "My Intervention" is in Spanish, "Je Suis Un Superstar" features various lyrics in French, and the album version of "I'm Not Afraid" has parts sung in Catalan.

After releasing the album, Lucien gave four free addition songs sung in both Russian and English on his Myspace: "Kreshatik", "Moscow", "Bez Tebya" (Without You), and "Shto S Taboj?" (What's Up?).

The album did not manage to chart in any country's albums chart. The verses of the song "Closure" are heard on "Wait for You", a track on the Sugababes album Sweet 7.

== Track listing ==
No.	Title	Writer(s)	Length
1.	"Saturday (Do I Care) (Album version)"	Lucien	4:10
2.	"Je Suis Un Superstar"	Lucien	4:09
3.	"My Intervention"	Lucien	4:02
4.	"It's Unconditional (2009 Version)"	Lucien	3:33
5.	"Closure"	Lucien	3:14
6.	"Ballad of Cheryl Cole"	Lucien	4:06
7.	"I'm Not Afraid (Album Version)"	Lucien	5:54
8.	"Let Me Go (English Version of Marxaré)"	Lucien	3:29
9.	"Give Me Your Love"	Lucien	4:15
10.	"Sentiments"	Lucien	4:39
11.	"I'm Not Afraid (Original Version (iTunes Bonus Track)"	Lucien	5:36

=== Singles ===
1. I'm Not Afraid [3:30] [Released: 19 January 2009] (Charted: Russian Airplay Chart #7, UK Unsigned Chart #11)
2. Marxaré [2:57] [Released: 4 May 2009]
3. Saturday (Do I Care) [3:50] [Released 28 September 2009]
