= Frame of Mind =

Frame of Mind may refer to:

- Frame of Mind (album), a 2006 album by Sandy Mölling
- Frame of Mind (film), a 2009 American film
- "Frame of Mind" (Star Trek: The Next Generation), a 1993 television episode
- Frames of Mind, a 1983 book by Howard Gardner

== See also ==
- State of Mind (disambiguation)
