= Footprints (Holly Valance album) =

Studio album by Holly Valance
- Released: 14 October 2002
- Genre: Pop; dance-pop
- Length: 46:39
- Label: London
- Producer: Darran Bennett; Boo Dan; Cutfather & Joe; Fredro; Julian Gallagher; Jem Godfrey; Nellee Hooper; Anders Kallmark; Korpi & Blackcell; Bill Padley; Richard Stannard; Phil Thornalley; Steve Welton-Jaimes

Holly Valance chronology
Footprints (2002)	State of Mind (2003)

Singles from Footprints
- 1. "Kiss Kiss" Released: 29 April 2002; 2. "Down Boy" Released: 30 September 2002; 3. "Naughty Girl" Released: 9 December 2002

Footprints is the debut studio album by Australian singer Holly Valance. It was released by London Records on 14 October 2002 in the United Kingdom. Valance worked with a variety of producers on the album, including Cutfather & Joe, Julian Gallagher, Jem Godfrey, Nellee Hooper, Bill Padley, Richard Stannard, and Phil Thornalley.

The album was a success in the United Kingdom, where the first single "Kiss Kiss" reached the top position on the singles chart. Footprints peaked at number nine on the UK Albums Chart, selling over 100,000 copies and being certified Gold. In Valance's home country of Australia, success was similar. Footprints reached the top fifteen, sold over 35,000 copies, and was later certified Gold. All three of its singles also reached the top 3 on the singles chart. Footprints was also successful in Japan, where the album reached number nineteen on the Oricon albums chart and sold 159,606 copies. It was later certified Gold.

== Critical reception ==
Professional ratings
Review scores
Source	Rating
Allmusic	3.5/5 stars
The Guardian	2/5 stars
MTV Asia	6/10

Allmusic rated the album three and a half stars out of five. Caroline Sullivan from The Guardian found that Valance's "Kylie impersonation lacks the self-deprecating charm of the original, without which this "project" feels like an ambitious soap starlet chancing her arm. Despite producer Nellee Hooper affixing a bit of acoustic gravitas to the likes of "Down Boy," Footprints quickly comes up against Valance's breathy mediocrity. That said, the burbling "Naughty Girl" makes it clear that Valance's primary purpose is to disturb impressionable men, making the album a triumph in that respect."

In 2020, the album was reappraised by Louis Hanson, writing for Pedestrian. Hanson praised the album's "nostalgic futurism" and "there was something so fresh about the album’s sound, particularly in the Australian music industry at the time." He continued: "To listen to Footprints in 2020 is to experience pure early-2000s pop in all its glory."

== Singles ==
"Kiss Kiss" was the first single released by Valance. The single was released in April 2002 and went straight to No. 1 on the UK and Australian charts.

"Down Boy" was the second single.

"Naughty Girl" was the third and final single from the album, becoming a Top 3 hit in Australia and Top 20 single in the UK. A fourth and final single, "Tuck Your Shirt In", was scheduled for release in the UK on 10 March 2003; however, the single was cancelled.

== Track listing ==
No.	Title	Writer(s)	Producer(s)	Length
1.	"Kiss Kiss"	Juliette Jaimes; Sezen Aksu; Steve Welton-Jaimes	Darran Bennett; Welton-Jaimes^{[a]}	3:25
2.	"Tuck Your Shirt In"	Joakim "Jock-E" Björklund; Savan Kotecha	Nellee Hooper	3:19
3.	"Down Boy"	Rob Davis	Hooper	3:26
4.	"City Ain't Big Enough"	Joe Belmaati; Mich Hansen; Remee	Cutfather; Joe	3:38
5.	"Cocktails and Parties"	Tom Nichols; Johnson Somerset	Cutfather; Joe	4:02
6.	"Whoop"	Ben Chapman; Jimmy Hogarth; Karen Poole	Padley; Godfrey	3:24
7.	"Hush Now"	Felix Howard; Nina Woodford; Fredrik Ödesj	Fredro	3:33
8.	"All in the Mind"	Fiona Gordon; Gerard Saunders	Hooper	3:47
9.	"Harder They Come"	Rob Davis; Holly Valance	Padley; Godfrey	3:38
10.	"Help Me Help You"	David Munday; Phil Thornalley; Melanie Chisholm	Thornalley; Anders Kallmark^{[a]}	3:36
11.	"Naughty Girl"	Grant Black; Cozi Costi; Deborah Ffrench; Taliaferro	Thornalley; Anders Kallmark^{[a]}	3:23
12.	"Connect"	Julian Gallagher; Nichols; Richard Stannard	Gallagher; Stannard	3:10
13.	"Send My Best"	Tina Dickow; Valance	Boo Dan	4:25

Japan and digital re-release bonus track
No.	Title	Writer(s)	Producer	Length
14.	"Twist"	Henrik Korpi; Mathias Johansson; Nichols	Korpi & Blackcell	3:46

North American digital release bonus tracks
No.	Title	Length
14.	"Kiss Kiss" (Wise Buddah Remix)	3:26
15.	"Kiss Kiss" (Jah Wobble Remix)	5:17
16.	"Kiss Kiss" (Agent Sumo 2 Mix)	7:43

Notes

- ^{^[a]} signifies additional producer

== Personnel ==
- Josh Abrahams – vocal producer, vocal recording
- James Banbury – programming
- Joe Belmaati – keyboards, programming
- Yak Bondy – programming
- Helen Boulding – background vocals
- Paul Brady – mixing assistant
- Pete Craigie – mixing
- Rob Davis – guitar
- Matthew Donaldson – photography
- Niklas Flyckt – mixing
- Marc Fox – percussion
- Julian Gallagher – programming, multi instruments, producer
- Jem Godfrey – arranger, programming, multi instruments, producer, mixing
- Nellee Hooper – producer, mixing
- Mark Jaimes – guitar
- Henrik Jonback – guitar
- Anders Kallmark – producer
- Katrina Leskanich – background vocals
- David Munday – guitar, keyboards
- Sharon Murphy – background vocals
- Jonas Ostman – mixing assistant
- Bill Padley – arranger, programming, multi instruments, producer, mixing
- Martin Phillipps – keyboards, programming
- Karen Ann Poole – background vocals
- Johnny Rockstar – beats
- Ian Rossiter – assistant engineer
- Richard Stannard – drums, producer, beatboxing
- Fredro Starr – arranger, keyboards, producer
- Alvin Sweeney – programming, engineer, mixing
- Phil Thornalley – guitar, producer
- Justin Tresidder – vocal producer
- Steve Welton-Jaimes – producer
- Nina Woodford – background vocals

== Charts ==
=== Weekly charts ===
Chart (2002)	Peak position
Australian Albums (ARIA)	15
Japan (Oricon)	19
UK Albums (OCC)	9

=== Year-end charts ===
Chart (2002)	Position
UK Albums (OCC)	127

== Certifications ==
Region	Certification	Certified units/sales
Japan (RIAJ)	Gold	100,000^{^}
United Kingdom (BPI)	Gold	100,000^{^}
^{^} Shipments figures based on certification alone.
