= Jack Lucien =

British comedian and singer (born 1988)

Lucien Jack
- Lucien Jack with Spanish singer Soraya in 2006

Background information
- Born: 19 July 1988 (age 38); United Kingdom
- Origin: Andorra
- Genres: Dance, pop, Europop, rock
- Occupations: Singer, songwriter, record producer, actor, comedian
- Years active: 2004–2014 (singer) 2017-present (comedian)
- Labels: Unconditional Records (2009–2014), Abbey Records (2006–2008), O'Clock Music (2004)

Lucien Jack (born 19 July 1988) is a British-born Andorran comedian, singer, and songwriter who has had success in Continental Europe under the names Hun, Lucien and Jack Lucien. He is best known for his 2009 single "I'm Not Afraid" and his drag character Teena.

== Biography ==
=== Music career ===
==== 2004 – 2007 ====
In 2004, under the name Hun he released his first single Gone Before It Happens under the Spanish record label, O'Clock Music. It was released on 25 July 2004.

In 2006, he returned with the name Lucien and released an EP What You Said To Me.... The only single was It's Unconditional, and it managed to achieve mild success in Europe.

==== 2008 – 2014 ====
In 2008, he released his debut album New 80s Musik. The only single was Rasputin which was released as a free download before the album's release. A different version of the album, titled Джэк Люсьен (Jack Lucien) was released in Russia in January 2009, featuring a collection of released and unreleased songs as well as remixes. A new song, I'm Not Afraid, was released as a radio only single and managed to reach Top 10 in the Russian Airplay Chart.

His second studio album as Jack Lucien, EuroSceptic, was released on 26 October 2009. Due to a lack of promotion and an underwhelming reception, it failed to spawn any success and its lead single Saturday was eventually cancelled.

In May 2010, Lucien announced that he had written a song for German pop group Monrose's new album Ladylike. The track entitled "Caffeine", was included as a bonus track in 2011.

In October 2011, he released a compilation album Everything I Want To Be. It featured a mixture of new tracks, old tracks and rarities, as well as the single only releases Hook U Up and State of Mind. To promote the LP, he undertook a brief tour of the United Kingdom and Spain, as well as appearing on the game show The Weakest Link, coming third.

On 20 January 2014, he released a new version of his song I'm Not Afraid, entitled "I'm Not Afraid '14 (English, Spanish, Russian and Catalan Version)".

=== Comedy career ===
==== 2017 - present ====
Since 2017, under his real name Lucien Jack, he has been performing as a comedian.

In 2019, he finished a tour of the European Union, apologizing for Brexit and appeared at Edinburgh Fringe.

== Eurovision ==
In October 2008, the singer stated that he was in talks to represent Andorra in the 2009 Eurovision Song Contest. His song, Marxaré, was pulled out by the singer just before the Andorran Finals to select their entrant. It was released as a download single on 4 May 2009 and its English version Let Me Go was included on his 2009 release Eurosceptic.

In 2011, he landed with co-writing the Russian entry for Eurovision Song Contest 2011 by Alexey Vorobyov entitled Get You in collaboration with the Moroccan-Swedish producer RedOne.

== Further activities ==
As well as being a singer, Lucien appeared on T4, performing "Rasputin" in May 2008, and appearing on the show Je Suis Un Rockstar in August.

He is a classical musician, and has performed classical guitar in various ensembles. In 2008, he performed with the Barents Dance Troup, joining them on both their Russian and Scandinavian tours.

In November 2009, Lucien made his acting debut in Ghetto at New Theatre, Nottingham, playing 'The Hashid'. Lucien furthered his theatrical career in 2010, acting in Our Town.

== Personal life ==
Lucien was born in Kettering, Northamptonshire, England. He grew up in Andorra and culturally sees himself as Andorran. He was educated at Winchester College and the University of Nottingham where he took a degree in modern languages. He also works in public relations. He is a friend of Spanish singer Soraya Arnelas and recorded a song named Anaesthetic together in 2008.

== Discography ==
=== Albums ===
Year	Album	Position		
Year	Album	UK	ES	FR
2008	New 80s Musik	199	64	99
2009	EuroSceptic	–	–	–

=== Singles ===
Year	Single	Position			
Year	Single	UK	AT	ES	RU
2004	"Gone Before It Happens" [1]	74	–	–	38
2006	"It's Unconditional" [2]	186	14	–	49
2008	"Rasputin"	–	–	35	41
2009	"I'm Not Afraid"	6	–	–	7
2011	"State of Mind"	–	–	–	–
2014	"I'm Not Afraid '14"	–	–	–	–

=== Other releases ===
Year	Album	Position
Year	Album	UK
2006	What You Said to Me... EP [2]	136
2011	Everything I Want to Be	–

[1] Recorded under the name Hun
[2] Released under the name Lucien
