= Down Boy =

2002 single by Holly Valance

Single by Holly Valance

from the album Footprints
- Released: 30 September 2002
- Length: 3:25
- Label: London; EngineRoom Music
- Songwriter: Rob Davis
- Producer: Nellee Hooper

Holly Valance singles chronology
"Kiss Kiss" (2002)	"Down Boy" (2002)	"Naughty Girl" (2002)

Music video
- "Down Boy" on YouTube

"Down Boy" is a song written by Rob Davis and produced by Nellee Hooper for Australian actress Holly Valance's debut album, Footprints (2002). Released on 30 September 2002 as the second single from the album, "Down Boy" charted within the top 10 in the United Kingdom (No. 2), Australia (No. 3), Hungary (No. 8), and Ireland (No. 8). British television presenter and actress Alexa Chung plays Valance's friend in the music video.

== Commercial performance ==
"Down Boy" debuted at No. 2 on the UK Singles Chart, selling under 39,000 copies during its first week. On Australia's ARIA Singles Chart, it peaked at No. 3 and was certified gold for shipments of 35,000 copies.

== Track listings ==
Australian and UK CD1

1. "Down Boy" (radio edit) – 3:25
2. "Down Boy" (Twin club remix) – 6:07
3. "Down Boy" (Almighty mix) – 6:48
4. "Down Boy" (video)

Australian CD2

1. "Down Boy" (radio edit) – 3:25
2. "Down Boy" (Aphrodite remix) – 6:25
3. "Down Boy" (Blackout remix) – 4:26
4. "Kiss Kiss" (Jah Wobble remix) – 5:15

UK CD2

1. "Down Boy" (radio edit) – 3:25
2. "Down Boy" (Aphrodite remix) – 6:25
3. "Kiss Kiss" (Jah Wobble remix) – 5:15

UK cassette single and European CD single

1. "Down Boy" (radio edit) – 3:25
2. "Down Boy" (Twin club remix) – 6:07

== Charts ==
=== Weekly charts ===
Chart (2002)	Peak position
Australia (ARIA)	3
Belgium (Ultratop 50 Flanders)	34
Europe (Eurochart Hot 100)	12
Germany (GfK)	62
Hungary (Single Top 40)	8
Ireland (IRMA)	8
Italy (FIMI)	11
Netherlands (Dutch Top 40)	34
Netherlands (Single Top 100)	36
New Zealand (Recorded Music NZ)	35
Scotland Singles (OCC)	4
Switzerland (Schweizer Hitparade)	70
UK Singles (OCC)	2

=== Year-end charts ===
Chart (2002)	Position
Australia (ARIA)	53
UK Singles (OCC)	113

== Certifications ==
Region	Certification	Certified units/sales
Australia (ARIA)	Gold	35,000^{^}
^{^} Shipments figures based on certification alone.
