= Everything I Want to Be =

Compilation album by Jack Lucien
- Released: 31 October 2011
- Recorded: 2008–2011
- Genres: Pop, Europop, rock
- Label: Unconditional
- Producers: Jack Lucien, Pep Sala

Jack Lucien chronology
Eurosceptic (2009)	Everything I Want to Be (2011)

Everything I Want to Be is a compilation album recorded by the British singer/producer Jack Lucien.

Everything I Want to Be was initially meant to serve as Lucien's third studio album, with its track-listing being published in July 2011. However, he stated on Twitter in September 2011 that instead, he was heading back to the studio and he would release a compilation album, featuring five new songs as well as old and never heard before material.

== Album notes ==
"State of Mind" was released as a download single on 26 June 2011. "Be With You" was originally promoted as a single to accompany the album, but nothing ever came of a proper release.

"Hook U Up" was recorded in 2009 to accompany Lucien's first foray into TV presenting Matchmaker. The single was released in 2010 and it is his first song since 2004's "Gone Before It Happens" to have a music video.

"Be With You" samples "Boig per tu" by Sau and "You're Leaving Me" is an English language cover of Jeanette's "Porque te vas", translated into English by Patsy Kensit and Elizabeth Hurley.

== Track listing ==
From iTunes.

1. "State of Mind" (album version) [4:26]
2. "The Snow" [3:10]
3. "Be With You" [3:53]
4. "Light Me Up" [3:47]
5. "Best Day of My Life" [3:25]
6. "Saturday" [3:54]
7. "Je Suis Un Superstar" [4:07]
8. "My Intervention" [4:03]
9. "It's Unconditional" (Eurosceptic version) [3:49]
10. "Somebody to Love" (Live version of "Sentiments") [3:44]
11. "Hook U Up" [3:19]
12. "You're Leaving Me" (English version of Jeanette's "Porque te vas") [3:12]
13. "Lo que soy" (Spanish version of "State of Mind") [3:30]

== Original track listing ==
- From TwitDoc.com
1. "State of Mind" (album version) [4:26]
2. "The Snow" [3:04]
3. "Be With You" [3:48]
4. "Light Me Up" [3:41]
5. "I Had Your Boyfriend" [4:20]
6. "I Want to Sing" [3:04]
7. "She's a Dancer" (with Amy Wyke) [4:04]
8. "Best Day of My Life" [3:31]
9. "Matchmaker" [3:36]
10. "You're Leaving Me" ("Porque te vas") [2:46]
11. "Hook U Up" [3:12]
12. "Lo que soy" [3:35]
13. "La neu" [3:04]
14. "Freedom of Segismundo" (live version) [3:15]
15. "Somebody to Love" (live English version of Sentiments) [3:50]
- It is unknown whether any of this track listing revealed in July 2011 will feature on any other record he may release.

== Singles ==
1. "Hook U Up" (promotional single on 18 July 2010)
2. "State of Mind" (teaser single, released on 27 June 2011).
3. "Be With You" (31 October 2011)
