= Naughty Girl (Holly Valance song) =

2002 single by Holly Valance

Single by Holly Valance

from the album Footprints
- B-side: "Twist"
- Released: 9 December 2002
- Length: 3:21
- Label: London; EngineRoom Music
- Songwriters: Grant Black; Cozi Costi; Deborah Ffrench; Brio Taliaferro
- Producer: Phil Thornalley

Holly Valance singles chronology
"Down Boy" (2002)	"Naughty Girl" (2002)	"State of Mind" (2003)

Music video
- "Naughty Girl" on YouTube

"Naughty Girl" is a song performed by Australian singer Holly Valance for her debut studio album, Footprints (2002). The song was released as the album's third and final single on 9 December 2002. It was written by Grant Black, Cozi Costi, Deborah Ffrench and Brio Taliaferro and produced by Phil Thornalley. The song reached number three in Australia and became a top-20 hit in Spain and the United Kingdom.

== Commercial performance ==
"Naughty Girl" debuted at number three on the Australian Singles Chart in the issue dated 20 January 2003, being the highest debut on the singles chart for that week. It became the third consecutive single from Footprints to reach the top 10 in Australia. The single eventually spent 11 weeks in the top 50 and 18 weeks in the top 100, leaving the chart in the issue dated 26 May 2003. It became the 16th-highest-selling single in Australia for 2003 and was awarded a gold certification on its third week on the chart for shipments in excess of 35,000 copies.

== Track listings ==
Australian and UK CD1

1. "Naughty Girl" – 3:26
2. "Naughty Girl" (Ernie Lake Hustle mix) – 5:42
3. "Naughty Girl" (E&B vocal dub) – 5:40
4. "Naughty Girl" (Bare Brush mix) – 4:57

Australian and UK CD2

1. "Naughty Girl" – 3:26
2. "Naughty Girl" (K-Klass radio edit) – 3:44
3. "Twist" – 3:45
4. "Naughty Girl" (video)

UK cassette single

1. "Naughty Girl" – 3:26
2. "Naughty Girl" (K-Klass radio edit) – 3:44

European CD single

1. "Naughty Girl" – 3:23
2. "Naughty Girl" (Crash full length vocal mix) – 7:25

== Credits and personnel ==
Credits are adapted from the liner notes of Footprints.

- Holly Valance – lead vocals
- Phil Thornalley – production, guitars
- Anders Kallmark – additional production, programming, keyboards
- Pete Craigie – mixing
- Helen Boulding – background vocals
- Cozi Costi – songwriting, additional vocals
- Martyn Phillips – programming, keyboards
- Marc Fox – percussion
- Grant Black – songwriting
- Deborah Ffrench – songwriting
- Brio Taliaferro – songwriting

== Charts ==
=== Weekly charts ===
Chart (2002–2003)	Peak position
Australia (ARIA)	3
Austria (Ö3 Austria Top 40)	56
Belgium (Ultratop 50 Flanders)	47
Europe (Eurochart Hot 100)	35
Germany (GfK)	52
Hungary (Rádiós Top 40)	38
Ireland (IRMA)	25
Italy (FIMI)	27
Netherlands (Dutch Top 40)	39
Netherlands (Single Top 100)	61
Poland (Polish Airplay Chart)	2
Scotland Singles (Official Charts)	11
Spain (Promusicae)	19
Sweden (Sverigetopplistan)	50
UK Singles (Official Charts)	16

=== Year-end charts ===
Chart (2003)	Position
Australia (ARIA)	60

== Certifications ==
Region	Certification	Certified units/sales
Australia (ARIA)	Gold	35,000^{^}
^{^} Shipments figures based on certification alone.

== Release history ==
Release dates and formats for "Naughty Girl"
Region	Date	Format	Label(s)	Catalogue	Ref.
United Kingdom	9 December 2002	CD	London; EngineRoom Music	LONCD472	
United Kingdom	9 December 2002	CD	London; EngineRoom Music	LOCDP472	
United Kingdom	9 December 2002	Cassette	London; EngineRoom Music	LONCS472	
Australia	13 January 2003	CD	London; EngineRoom Music	ERM0011	
Australia	13 January 2003	CD	London; EngineRoom Music	ERM0012	
