= The Handler (album) =

Studio album by Har Mar Superstar
- Released: September 14, 2004
- Genre: R&B, indie rock
- Length: 40:13
- Label: Record Collection
- Producer: John Fields

Har Mar Superstar chronology
You Can Feel Me (2002)	The Handler (2004)	Dark Touches (2009)

Singles from The Handler
- 1. "DUI" Released: 2004; 2. "Body Request" Released: 2005

The Handler is the third solo studio album by Har Mar Superstar. It was released via Record Collection in 2004. It features contributions from Karen O, Michael Bland, Pete Thomas, and Holly Valance. It peaked at number 68 on the UK Albums Chart.

== Critical reception ==
Professional ratings
Aggregate scores
Source	Rating
Metacritic	57/100
Review scores
Source	Rating
AllMusic	2.5/5 stars
Blender	3/5 stars
Dotmusic	8/10
The Guardian	3/5 stars
NME	8/10
Pitchfork	1.9/10
Q	2/5 stars
Rolling Stone	3/5 stars
Uncut	8/10
URB	4/5 stars

At Metacritic, which assigns a weighted average score out of 100 to reviews from mainstream critics, the album received an average score of 57% based on 13 reviews, indicating "mixed or average reviews".

Jolie Lash of NME gave the album 4 stars out of 5, calling it "Har Mar Superstar's best effort to date." Johnny Loftus of Pitchfork gave the album a 1.9 out of 10, saying, "The Handler only meagerly amplifies what he was already doing, probably pleasing his no doubt respectable cadre of core followers, but handily turning off the rest of humanity."

== Track listing ==
No.	Title	Length
1.	"Transit"	3:36
2.	"Body Request"	3:30
3.	"DUI"	3:14
4.	"Cut Me Up"	3:11
5.	"Sugar Pie"	2:51
6.	"As (Seasons)"	3:49
7.	"Save the Strip"	3:49
8.	"O"	3:09
9.	"Back the Camel Up"	3:09
10.	"Bird in the Hand"	3:18
11.	"Back in the Day"	3:04
12.	"Alone Again (Naturally)"	3:35

== Charts ==
Chart	Peak position
UK Albums (OCC)	68
