= State of Mind (Holly Valance song) =

2003 single by Holly Valance

Single by Holly Valance

from the album State of Mind
- Released: 20 October 2003
- Studio: Metrophonic (London, England)
- Length: 3:20
- Label: EngineRoom Music, Universal Music Australia
- Songwriters: Mark Taylor, Jeff Taylor, Steve Torch
- Producers: Jeff Taylor, Mark Taylor

Holly Valance singles chronology
"Naughty Girl" (2002)	"State of Mind" (2003)

Music video
- "State of Mind" on YouTube

"State of Mind" is a song by Australian singer and actress Holly Valance, from her second studio album, State of Mind (2003). It was released on 20 October 2003 as the only single from the album, peaking at number 14 on the Australian Singles Chart. The song became her third top-10 single in the United Kingdom, peaking at number eight and spending a total of 10 weeks in the top 100.

== Background ==
When talking about her change of musical direction, Valance said "It's kind of different cos at the time I was listening to rock, I was listening to dance and lots of electro and I loved them all equally. I thought what would happen if we put them all in a pot and see what happens. And the people I was working with at the time really like that idea. So everyone was working on the same level with the same goals in mind. What we wanted to get out of it was a bit darker, a bit harder. It's a very kind of upbeat record and that's what I like to do."

== Release ==
"State of Mind" was released in Australia on 20 October 2003 as a CD single, which featured several remixes as well as an extended version of the song. The song was released a week later in the United Kingdom on 27 October as a CD single that features remixes as well as an enhanced section that contained the music video and a photo gallery. It was also released as a DVD single which contained the video and the behind the scenes of filming the video.

== Commercial performance ==
In her native Australia, "State of Mind" debuted on the ARIA Charts at number 21, peaking at 14 during its third week on the chart, giving Valance her forth top-20 hit. It lasted 13 weeks within the top 50. "State of Mind" debuted and peaked at number eight on the UK Singles Chart, becoming Valance's third top-10 hit in the United Kingdom. It lasted ten weeks on the chart and was the 176th-best-selling single in the country that year.

== Music video ==
=== Background ===
The official music video for "State of Mind" was filmed in Los Angeles and was directed by Jake Nava, who previously directed the music video for "Naughty Girl". The video uses the album version of the song. In an interview with CBBC, Valance said of the video, "I want people to be attracted to the visuals that go with the song. I don’t think you have to go ridiculously far but you need to create something where people go ‘Oh wow’, hopefully, anyway!".

=== Synopsis ===
The video begins with Valance driving a 1966 Oldsmobile Toronado through a street at night. She stops at the red light and turns to see two women in the car next to her, and once the light turns green, she gives them the middle finger and drives away, leaving the women shocked. Valance arrives at a grunge nightclub and performs on stage inside the club. She is seen dancing and crawling on the floor. Valance performs on stage again but when the chorus ends, she walks off backstage, enters a dressing room (where two women are kissing on a couch) and changes into a black dress. She then runs out of the club, enters her car and drives away. It's the morning and Valance parks her car outside a house where the afterparty is happening. She enters the building where beautiful women and sugar-daddy types are enjoying each other's company, and begins to writhe and pose on a bed while being recorded by a video camera. The video ends with Valance looking at the video camera flirtatiously while unzipping her dress, alluding to porn about to be made, as the screen fades to black.

== Track listings ==
Australian CD single

1. "State of Mind" (radio edit)
2. "State of Mind" (Vertigo remix)
3. "State of Mind" (Rhythm Shed radio edit)
4. "State of Mind" (Felix da Housekatt mix)
5. "State of Mind" (extended original)

European CD single

1. "State of Mind"
2. "State of Mind" (Felix da Housekatt mix)

UK CD single

1. "State of Mind"
2. "State of Mind" (Vertigo extended mix)
3. "State of Mind" (Felix da Housekatt mix)
4. "State of Mind" (video)

UK DVD single

1. "State of Mind" (video)
2. "State of Mind" (behind the scenes video)

== Credits and personnel ==
Credits are lifted from the Australian CD single liner notes and the State of Mind album booklet.

Studio

- Recorded and mixed at Metrophonic Studios (London, England)

Personnel

- Mark Taylor – writing, production, mixing
- Jeff Taylor – writing, production, programming, mixing
- Steve Torch – writing, guitar
- Matt Furmidge – mixing assistant
- Vanessa Letocq – production coordination

== Charts ==
=== Weekly charts ===
Chart (2003)	Peak position
Australia (ARIA)	14
Finland (Suomen virallinen lista)	16
Hungary (Single Top 40)	5
Ireland (IRMA)	27
Italy (FIMI)	41
Scotland Singles (OCC)	6
UK Singles (OCC)	8

=== Year-end charts ===
Chart (2003)	Position
UK Singles (OCC)	176

== Release history ==
Region	Date	Format(s)	Label(s)	Ref.
Australia	20 October 2003	CD	EngineRoom Music; Universal Music Australia	
United Kingdom	27 October 2003	CD; DVD	London	
