= Har Mar Superstar =

American singer (born 1978)

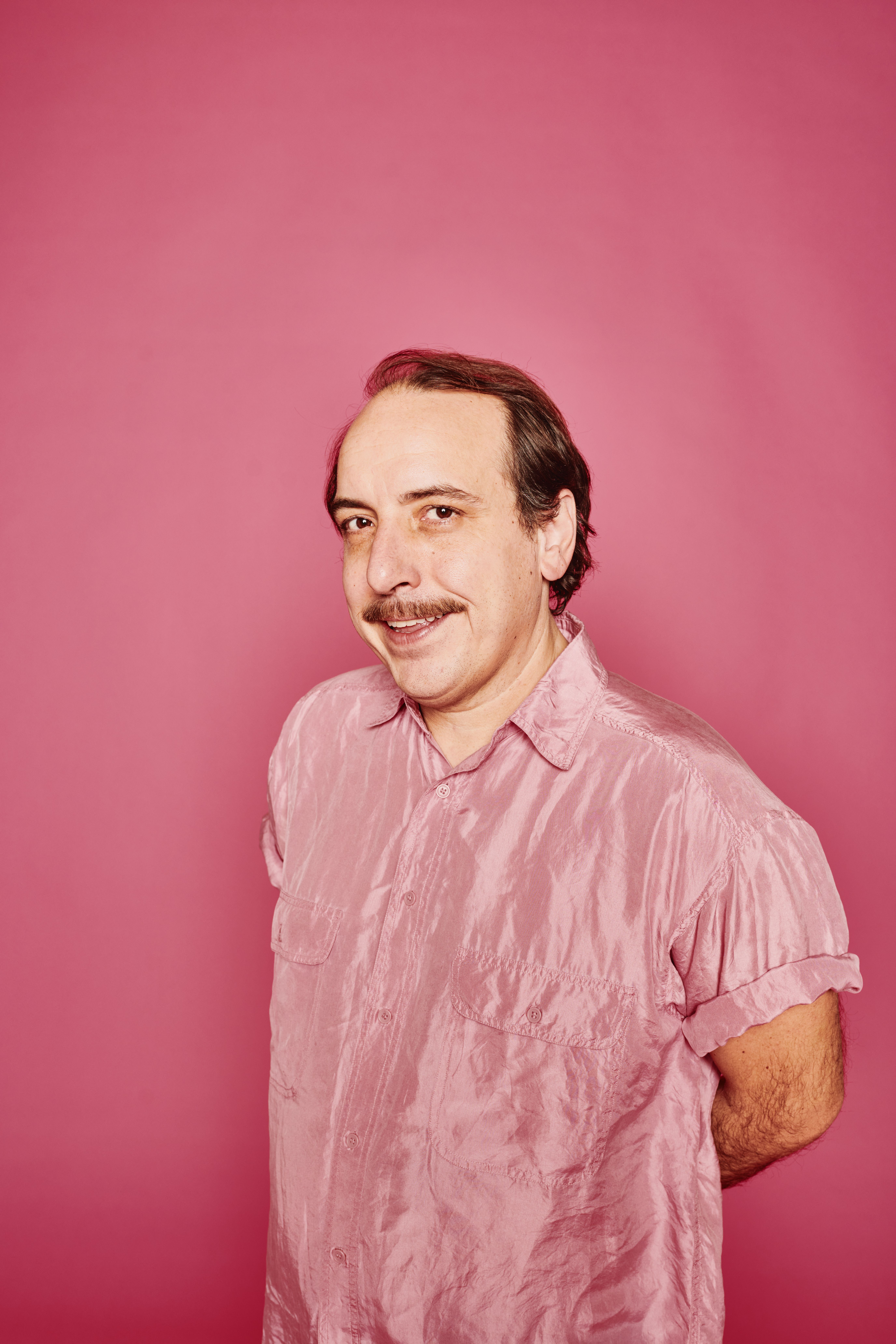
- Har Mar Superstar

Background information
- Also known as: Sean Na Na
- Born: Sean Tillmann; February 6, 1978 (age 48); Marshall, Minnesota, United States
- Genres: Indie rock, pop, R&B, soul, punk rock
- Occupations: Singer-songwriter, actor
- Instruments: Vocals, guitar
- Labels: B-Unique Records, Cult Records, Dilettante Recordings, Kill Rock Stars, Love Online Records, Record Collection
- Website: www.harmarsuperstar.com

Sean Tillmann-Hauser (born February 6, 1978) is an American singer-songwriter and actor. He has performed and released studio albums as Sean Na Na and as a member of hardcore band Calvin Krime, but is best known for his work under the name Har Mar Superstar.

== Early life ==
Tillmann was born in Marshall, Minnesota, on February 6, 1978, at Weiner Memorial Hospital. In 1987, his family moved to Owatonna, Minnesota. He graduated from the Perpich Center for Arts Education in Golden Valley, Minnesota. His family is still based in Owatonna, where his mother and father are retired educators.

== Career ==
Tillmann is known in the U.S. independent music community as a singer-songwriter. He is best known by his alter ego Har Mar Superstar, a character whose sweaty, energetic live performances were once infamous for often concluding with a perspiring, de-layered Tillmann disrobed down to a pair of briefs. His primary musical genres are contemporary R&B and pop music.

The name comes from the Har Mar Mall, a shopping center in Roseville, Minnesota; Tillmann originally said he was Sean Tillmann's twin brother, "Harold Martin Tillmann", from which he said the name originated.

After playing in a number of garage bands during high school, Tillmann moved to Saint Paul, Minnesota, and joined three-piece noise band Calvin Krime as bassist and lead vocalist. Over three and a half years, it recorded two albums and an EP and regularly toured the country. When Calvin Krime disbanded in 1998, Tillmann explored his softer pop side in Sean Na Na. Reflecting on what led to the creation of Har Mar Superstar, Tillmann said, "I kinda always thought that [I was going to do R&B], I just had to figure out how to do it ... I just had to figure out how to make beats and write songs in that style." In 2000, he enlisted the help of several Saint Paul musician friends and the result was the pseudonymously self-titled album "Har Mar Superstar" that appeared on Kill Rock Stars in 2001.

Soon, Tillmann was touring all over the U.S. as Har Mar Superstar. Initially, he appeared onstage in a choir robe and was accompanied solely by pre-recorded beats emanating from his MiniDisc player. After his follow-up album, You Can Feel Me, elevated Har Mar's popularity in the U.S. and put him on the map in the United Kingdom, his stage outfits became more theatrical and several live shows featured female dancers. By the time the third album, The Handler, was released in 2004, Har Mar Superstar regularly toured with a drummer and a bassist to fortify the prerecorded material. Shows ranged from club dates to festival engagements (Reading and Leeds Festivals).

In addition to his own headlining tours, Har Mar opened for Ben Lee, The Strokes, Incubus, Tenacious D and the Yeah Yeah Yeahs. In 2007, Har Mar supported the Red Hot Chili Peppers on their tour of Australia and New Zealand. Fabrizio Moretti and Tony Bevilacqua have served as Har Mar's rhythm section, playing drums and bass guitar respectively. Har Mar supported Sia on her 2008 tour with Denver Dalley on bass and Nick Slack on drums. Other bassists have included Jenni Tarma, Jeff Quinn, and John Fields, while Bert Thomas, Jeff Brown and Michael Bland have manned the drum stool.

As well as a solo artist, Har Mar Superstar is a songwriter. He has written songs for artists including The Cheetah Girls, Jennifer Lopez, Kelly Osbourne, and Ben Adams. After "Tall Boy" was rejected by Britney Spears's management, Har Mar recorded the song for his album Dark Touches.

In 2008, Har Mar Superstar was part of the live touring set-up of Neon Neon, the band created by Super Furry Animals' Gruff Rhys and producer/solo artist Boom Bip. Har Mar sings and plays percussion during live shows and is featured on the recorded version and video of "Trick for Treat", a song on the band's debut album, Stainless Style, which was nominated for the Mercury Prize in 2008. Har Mar also performed backing vocals and appeared in the video for Ben Lee's "Catch My Disease".

Har Mar's fourth studio album, Dark Touches, was released on October 12, 2009, in the U.K. and on October 13 in the U.S. Playing cities throughout the U.S., Canada, and the U.K. in 2009 and 2010, Har Mar's Dark Touches touring band featured Denver Dalley on guitar, Jeff Quinn on bass, and Will Rockwell-Scott on drums.

In February 2011, Har Mar started recording and performing with the soft rock-inspired band Gayngs and experimental rock group Marijuana Deathsquads. Har Mar and Marijuana Deathsquads teamed up for monthlong residencies in Los Angeles at Spaceland, in New York City at Bowery Electric, and in Austin, Texas.

Har Mar and Father John Misty (a.k.a. Josh Tillman) joined forces for a tour in May 2012. While Sean Tillmann and Josh Tillman are not related, the tour was informally called the "Two Tillman(n)s Tour". Har Mar performed material from his upcoming soul album Bye Bye 17, and his band consisted of Macey Taylor on bass, Quinn on guitar, and J. Tillman on drums.

Bye Bye 17 was released on April 23, 2013, on Julian Casablancas's Cult Records. Tillmann toured the new material throughout the U.S. in March, April and May 2013 with Dalley on bass, Quinn on guitar, and Ryan McMahon on drums. In August and September 2013, Har Mar Superstar supported the Yeah Yeah Yeahs on various tour dates. Har Mar and Lizzo toured the U.S. in September and October. A 14-date tour of the U.K. followed in November. At the end of 2014, Har Mar started writing songs for a new album and toured the U.S. with The Pizza Underground.

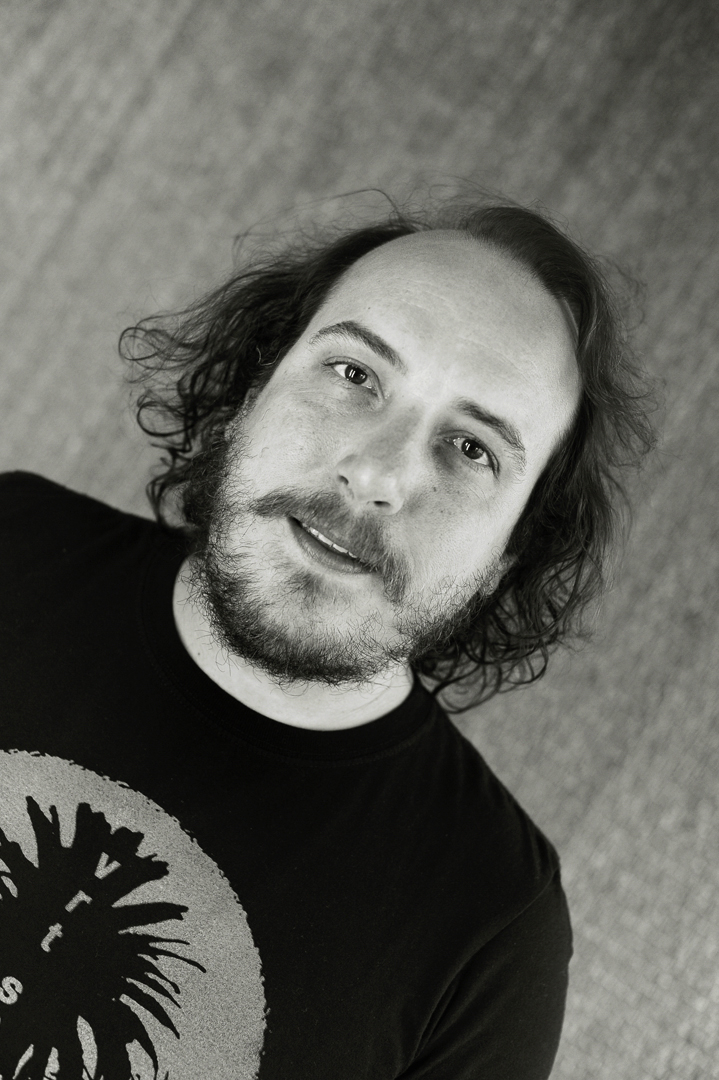
Har Mar Superstar. 2014

Collaborating once again with Casablancas, Tillmann released his sixth Har Mar album, Best Summer Ever, on April 15, 2016. Since its inception, Best Summer Ever was imagined as a "Greatest Hits of Har Mar Superstar from 1950–1985", even though Tillmann was born in 1978. Touring the U.S. and Europe in support of the album, Har Mar enlisted six other musicians. Har Mar Superstar's seventh album, Roseville, came together in late 2020 and is the first true collaborative effort of the whole touring band. It was distance recorded by all the members in their home studios and the band's home base, Mid City Studio, in Minneapolis. The band is Nelson Devereaux, Jake Baldwin, Adam Hurlburt, Ethan Elseth, Aaron Baum, and Ryan Mach, and everyone had a hand in co-writing. It has been described as an "existential homecoming" that chronicles Tillmann's return to life as a Minnesotan.

== Television, film and commercials ==
Tillmann has performed on several U.S. television shows, including The Sharon Osbourne Show, Late Night with Jimmy Fallon, and Jimmy Kimmel Live!. In the U.K., he has appeared on Channel 4 music programme Born Sloppy, Bo' Selecta!, and Friday Night with Jonathan Ross. In 2003 and 2014, he was a guest on Never Mind the Buzzcocks.

Har Mar has been spokesman for Vladivar Vodka, which produced a series of TV commercials that gained an underground cult appreciation for their blatantly sexual content. Har Mar has also been a spokesman for Lynx deodorant in the U.K.

Tillmann has a cameo in the 2004 movie Starsky & Hutch as Dancing Rick, a disco dance champion who faces off in a contest with Ben Stiller's character.

Har Mar played a roller derby coach in Whip It, a film by Drew Barrymore. He also contributed a cover of The Association's "Never My Love" to the film's soundtrack, with additional vocals by Adam Green, instrumentation & production by Flowers of Doom (Josiah Steinbrick & Matthew "Cornbread" Compton), and Flea on trumpet.

On October 26, 2009, Har Mar Superstar was the musical guest on Late Night with Jimmy Fallon and earned rave reviews for his performance of "Tall Boy", immediately increasing his popularity in North America.

In 2012, Har Mar appeared in the film Pitch Perfect as Clef No. 2 (a member of an older a cappella quartet), alongside Joe Lo Truglio, Jason Jones, and Donald Faison.

In October 2014, Har Mar returned to Never Mind the Buzzcocks alongside Nicole Scherzinger, Kerry Godliman, and James Acaster.

In the Season 3 premiere of Broad City, Har Mar played hipster gallery patron "Oy Bomb", a reference to the similarly named Soy Bomb who crashed Bob Dylan's 1998 Grammy performance.

Har Mar performs the theme song, and is the lead character of the "Skeleton Crew" band, for the 2017 Netflix revival of Mystery Science Theater 3000.

== Honors and awards ==
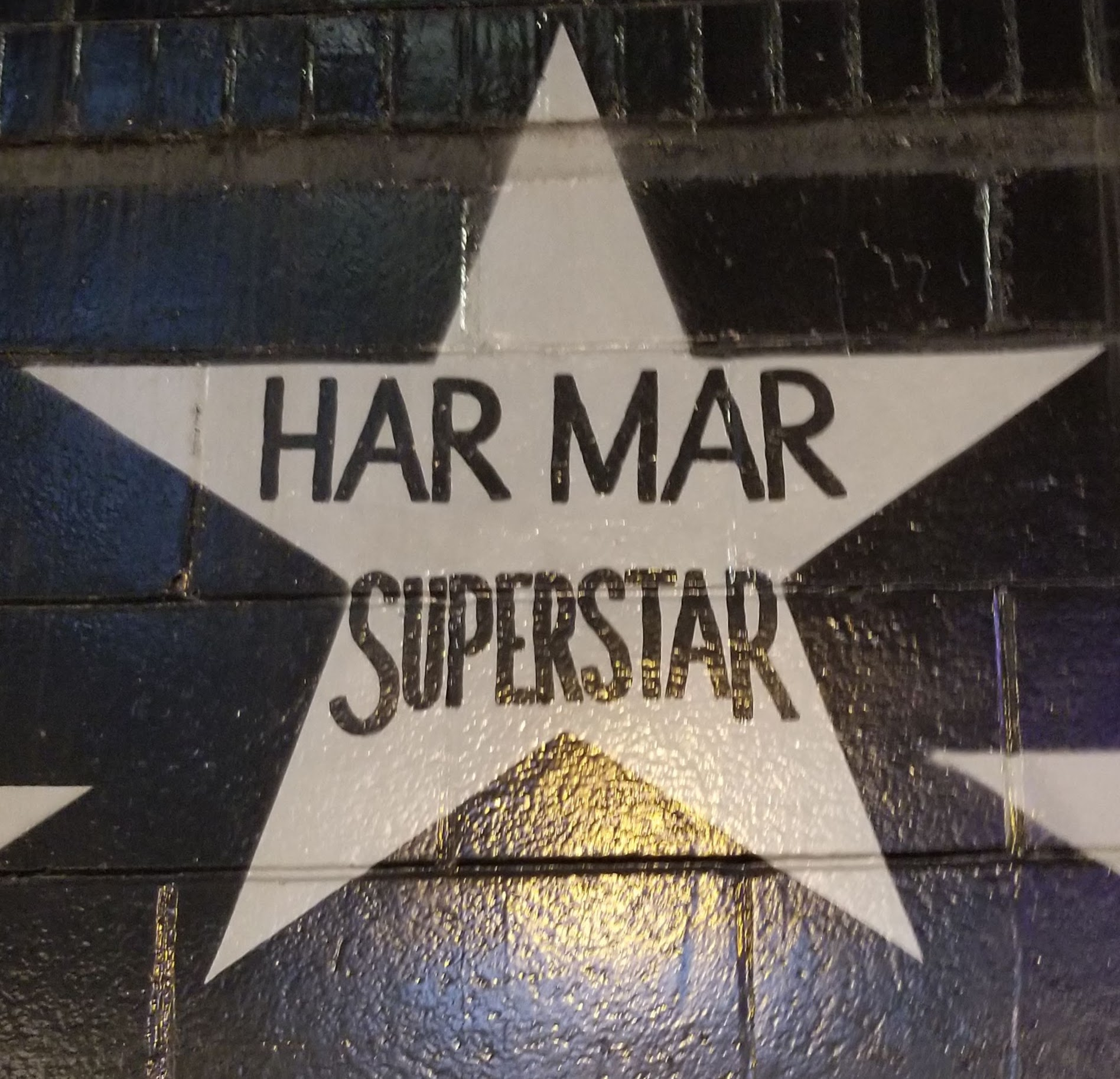
Har Mar Superstar's former star on the outside mural of the Minneapolis nightclub First Avenue

Tillmann was named the NME's 2004 Rock and Roll Man of the Year.

In 2013, Minneapolis mayor R. T. Rybak declared September 20, 2013 "Har Mar Superstar Day". Tillmann was presented with an official proclamation from the city in recognition of his achievements in music and film, and in light of his continued connection to Minneapolis. In celebration, Tillmann kicked off his fall U.S. tour with a special performance that night at Minneapolis club First Avenue.

Tillmann was honored with a star on First Avenue's outside mural, which recognizes performers who have played sold-out shows or otherwise demonstrated a major contribution to the culture at the venue. According to journalist Steve Marsh, receiving a star "might be the most prestigious public honor an artist can receive in Minneapolis." After multiple sexual misconduct accusations against Tillmann emerged, including "five women [giving] the Star Tribune detailed accounts of the singer groping them without their consent—sometimes at bars and sometimes at his house, where the party often continued" and accounts of two cases in which Tillmann "exposed himself", First Avenue painted over Har Mar Superstar's star.

== Personal life ==
In 2016, Tillmann moved from Brooklyn back to Minnesota, specifically to the Northeast neighborhood of Minneapolis.

During the COVID-19 pandemic, Tillmann and his fiancée Laura Hauser created coloring books to raise funds to help affected businesses, including First Avenue and several local bars, including Grumpy's and Palmer's Bar.

Tillmann publicly discussed getting sober and how he became a mail carrier during the pandemic while promoting his album Roseville.

He married his partner Laura in 2022, double-barrelling their surnames to be legally known as Sean Tillmann-Hauser.

== Sexual assault accusations ==
In March 2021, three unnamed women accused Tillmann of sexual misconduct in the Star Tribune after a statement of "a collective of survivors and allies" was distributed via social media, alleging that a total of seven individuals had experienced sexual misconduct by Tillmann, ranging from "pointed inappropriate sexual comments and grooming to physical sexual assault." Tillmann issued a since-deleted statement addressing the allegations on social media, denying the sexual assault allegation and addressing the others by referring to potential "conduct that was harmful, abusive, and selfish", saying "I am deeply sorry to anyone who feels I've hurt them; what matters here is not my feelings or perspective but to take these statements seriously and respectfully."

The Star Tribune published a fourth anonymous accuser's narrative in a follow-up article, and reported a brewery severing business ties. The West Central Tribune reported Tillmann's ousting as a partner at Moorhead, Minnesota, bar Harold's on Main; the bar released a since-deleted statement on Facebook saying: "At Harold's, we believe Women. We take the accusations against our business partner Sean Tillmann very seriously. Upon learning of these accusations last week, we swiftly asked for Sean's resignation and immediate dismissal from our business."

In April 2022, Tillmann booked a July 15 show in Minneapolis, writing, "I'm celebrating 3 years free of alcohol today by announcing my 1st show back in a long time!" Shortly after his announcement, the website selling tickets for the show said, "the July 15 show is moving to a larger, TBA venue because of 'OUTSTANDING' ticket demand", but a spokesperson for the venue said the show was "canceled late Saturday due to the volume of community concerns voiced over Tillmann's allegedly abusive past". Publicist Lisa Braun Dubbels called this a "masterclass in how not to handle a PR crisis", to which Tillmann sarcastically replied, "Thank you". Andrea Swensson, formerly of City Pages and 89.3 the Current, wrote: "Sean, read the room. The announcement and drama around this show is causing widespread pain and distress. I'm sure you'll block me as well, but I'd suggest you sit down, take a beat, and think about what you're doing here."

A June 1, 2023, show that Tillmann booked at The Hall at Fargo Brewing was canceled two days after it was announced. In the cancellation announcement, the promoter, Jade Nielsen, said he had "made a mistake in booking the Har Mar show and wholeheartedly accept it ... the announcement was supposed to be made on Facebook with the comments section closed at the request of the Har Mar Superstar team", but despite this request, "The comments [had] been left open and as of 9 a.m. Tuesday morning the post had more than 35 comments, mostly negative." Nielsen added, in response to the community outcry, "Your voice is always welcome and will be heard." This followed the cancellation of another show at The What's Up Lounge in Mankato earlier that week.

== Discography ==
Albums

- Har Mar Superstar (2000, Kill Rock Stars)
- You Can Feel Me (2002, Record Collection)
- The Handler (2004, Record Collection)
- Dark Touches (2009, Dilettante Recordings)
- Bye Bye 17 (2013, Cult Records)
- Best Summer Ever (2016, Cult Records)
- Roseville (2021, Love OnLine)

EPs

- Personal Boy (2017, Love OnLine Records)

Singles

- "Power Lunch" (2002, B-Unique Records)
- "EZ Pass" (2003, B-Unique Records)
- "Brothers & Sisters" (2003, B-Unique Records)
- "DUI" (2004, Record Collection)
- "Body Request" (2005, Record Collection)
- "Lady, You Shot Me" (2013, Cult Records)
- "Prisoner" (2013, Cult Records)
- "Youth Without Love" (2016, Cult Records)
- "Anybody's Game" (2016, Cult Records)
- "It Was Only Dancing (Sex)" (2016, Cult Records)
- "How Did I Get Through the Day" (2016, Cult Records)
- "Where We Began" (2021, Love OnLine)
