= Lara Fabian discography =

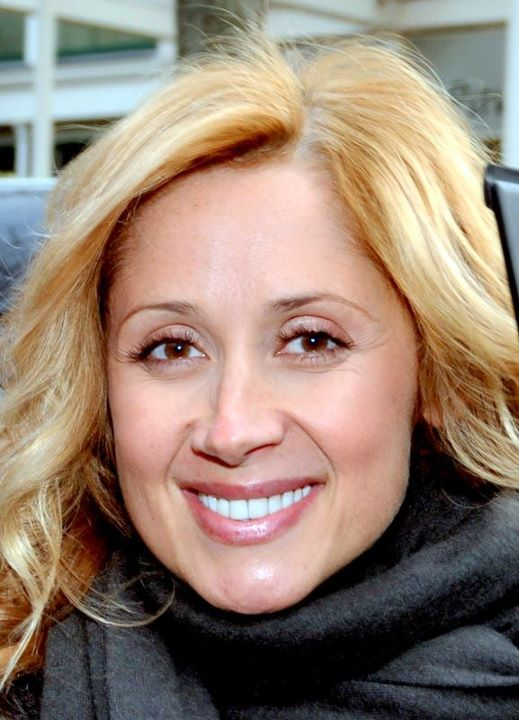
- Fabian in 2012
- Studio albums: 16
- Live albums: 5
- Compilation albums: 3
- Singles: 52
- Music videos: 40
- DVD releases: 5
- DVD box sets: 5

The discography of Belgian and Canadian singer Lara Fabian consists of sixteen studio albums, five live albums, three compilation album, eight box sets, eight video albums, fifty two singles and a range of other album appearances. Being multilingual, Fabian sings in French, Italian, English, Spanish, Portuguese, Russian, Hebrew, Greek and German.

Lara Fabian claims 20 million records sold. However, according to various media, her actual record sales are estimated at 12 million worldwide. She is the best-selling Belgian-born female artist of all time. She is a lyric soprano with a vocal range that spans three octaves from C3 to C♯6 in live performances.

== Albums ==
=== Studio albums ===
List of studio albums, with selected chart positions and certifications
Title	Album details	Peak chart positions											Certifications
Title	Album details	BEL (WA)	BEL (FL)	CAN	CAN QC	FIN	FRA	GER	NL	SWE	SWI	US	Certifications
Lara Fabian	Released: 1991; Format: cassette, CD; Label: Polydor, Universal	—	—	—	3	—	—	—	—	—	—	—	
Carpe diem	Released: 1994; Format: Cassette, CD; Label: PolyGram	16	—	—	1	—	4	—	—	—	—	—	MC: 2× Platinum
Pure	Released: 1996; Format: Cassette, CD; Label: PolyGram	3	—	7	1	—	3	—	—	—	—	—	BEA: Platinum; MC: Platinum; SNEP: Diamond; IFPI SWI: Platinum
Lara Fabian	Released: November 29, 1999; Format: Cassette, CD; Label: Columbia, Epic	2	11	—	12	4	1	26	44	38	14	85	BEA: Platinum; MC: Gold; SNEP: Platinum; IFPI SWE: Gold; IFPI SWI: Gold
Nue	Released: August 28, 2001; Format: Cassette, CD; Label: Polydor, Universal	1	—	—	3	—	2	—	—	—	10	—	BEA: Gold; SNEP: 2× Platinum; IFPI SWI: Gold
A Wonderful Life	Released: June 1, 2004; Format: CD, digital; Label: Sony	4	54	—	40	36	8	80	68	—	18	—	
9	Released: March 29, 2005; Format: CD, digital download; Label: Polydor, Universal	2	67	—	3	—	3	—	—	—	32	—	BEA: Platinum; SNEP: 2× Gold
Toutes les femmes en moi	Released: May 25, 2009; Format: CD, digital download; Label: Universal Music	1	60	25	5	—	3	—	—	—	41	—	BEA: Platinum
Every Woman in Me	Released: October 8, 2009; Format: CD, digital download; Label: 9 Productions	—	—	—	—	—	—	—	—	—	—	—	
Mademoiselle Zhivago	Released: September 15, 2010; Format: CD, digital download; Label: SBA Production	2	—	—	—	—	—	—	—	—	—	—	
Le Secret	Released: April 15, 2013; Format: CD, digital download; Label: 9 Productions, Warner	1	37	—	32	—	1	—	—	—	16	—	BEA: Gold; SNEP: Gold
Ma vie dans la tienne	Released: November 6, 2015; Format: CD, digital download; Label: 9 Productions, Warner	3	44	—	—	—	4	—	—	—	14	—	BEA: Gold; SNEP: Platinum
Camouflage	Released: October 6, 2017; Format: CD, digital download, vinyl; Label: 9 Productions	4	57	—	—	—	17	—	—	—	27	—	
Papillon	Released: February 8, 2019; Format: CD, digital download; Label: 9 Productions	2	56	20	—	—	12	—	—	—	58	—	
Lockdown sessions	Released: December 16, 2020; Format: CD, digital download; Label: 9 Productions	—	—	—	—	—	—	—	—	—	—	—	
Je suis là	Released: November 29, 2024; Format: CD, digital download; Label: 9 Productions	4	—	—	—	—	10	—	—	—	66	—	
"—" denotes a recording that did not chart or was not released in that territory.

=== Live albums ===
List of studio albums, with selected chart positions and certifications
Title	Album details	Peak chart positions				Certifications
Title	Album details	BEL	CAN QC	FRA	SWI	Certifications
Live 1999	Released: March 2, 1999; Format: CD, digital download; Label: Polydor	1	19	1	—	BEA: Platinum
Live 2002	Released: November 12, 2002; Format: CD, digital download; Label: Polydor	9	—	10	61	SNEP: 2× Gold
En toute intimité	Released: October 14, 2003; Format: CD, digital download; Label: Polydor	1	33	6	31	SNEP: Platinum
Un regard 9 Live	Released: October 20, 2006; Format: CD, digital download; Label: 9 Productions	3	50	7	41	
Lara Live 2022	Released: December 2022; Format: CD only by her website; Label: 9 Productions	—	—	—	—	
"—" denotes a recording that did not chart or was not released in that territory.

=== Compilations ===
List of studio albums, with selected chart positions and certifications
Title	Album details	Peak chart positions						Certifications
Title	Album details	BEL (WA)	BEL (FL)	CAN QC	FRA	ITA	SWI	Certifications
De la Révélation à la Consécration	Released: November 11, 1998; Format: CD, digital download; Label: Polydor	—	—	—	—	—	—	
Best of Lara Fabian	Released: November 15, 2010; Format: CD, digital download; Label: Universal Music	1	96	17	172	—	97	BEA: Platinum
Essential	Released: February 24, 2015; Format: CD, digital download; Label: Warner Music Italy	—	—	—	—	49	—	
"—" denotes a recording that did not chart or was not released in that territory.

=== Box sets ===
List of albums
Title	Album details
Lara Fabian	Released: December 8, 2004; Format: CD, digital download; Label: Polydor
Coffret	Released: December 17, 2004; Format: CD, digital download; Label: Polydor
Coffret, Vol. 2	Released: December 17, 2004; Format: CD, digital download; Label: Polydor
Coffret, Vol. 3	Released: December 17, 2004; Format: CD, digital download; Label: Polydor
Carpe diem / Pure	Released: August 26, 2008; Format: CD, digital download; Label: Polydor
4 Original Albums	Released: September 26, 2011; Format: CD, digital download; Label: Universal

== Singles ==
=== As main artist ===
List of singles, with selected chart positions and certifications
Title	Year	Peak chart positions											Certifications	Album
Title	Year	BEL (WA)	BEL (FL)	CAN	CAN QC	FRA	GER	NL	SWE	SWI	US	US A/C	Certifications	Album
"Croire"	1988	—	—	—	—	—	—	—	—	—	—	—		Lara Fabian
"Je sais" (with Franck Olivier)	1989	—	—	—	32	—	—	—	—	—	—	—		Lara Fabian
"Je m'arrêterai pas de t'aimer"	1991	—	—	—	25	—	—	—	—	—	—	—		Lara Fabian
"Tu t'en vas"	1994	—	—	—	1	—	—	—	—	—	—	—		Carpe diem
"Si tu m'aimes"	1994	—	—	—	1	—	—	—	—	—	—	—	BEA: Gold	Carpe diem
"Tout"	1997	2	—	—	1	4	—	—	—	—	—	—	BEA: Gold	Pure
"Je t'aime"	1997	6	—	—	3	6	—	—	—	—	—	—	BEA: Gold	Pure
"Humana"	1998	21	—	—	1	15	—	—	—	—	—	—		Pure
"Si tu m'aimes"	1998	3	—	—	—	5	—	—	—	—	—	—	BEA: Gold	Pure
"La Différence"	1999	11	—	—	5	10	—	—	—	—	—	—	SNEP: Gold	Pure
"Réquiem pour un fou" (featuring Johnny Hallyday)	1999	11	—	—	—	8	—	—	—	86	—	—	BEA: Platinum	Live 1999
"Adagio"	1999	3	29	—	24	5	—	66	—	—	—	—	SNEP: Gold	Lara Fabian
"I Will Love Again"	2000	5	52	4	20	16	25	—	31	14	32	10		Lara Fabian
"I Am Who I Am"	2000	—	—	19	—	67	70	—	—	64	—	—		Lara Fabian
"Love by Grace"	2001	—	—	—	—	—	85	—	59	—	—	25		Lara Fabian
"J'y crois encore"	2001	8	—	—	11	17	—	—	—	23	—	—	SNEP: Gold	Nue
"Immortelle"	2002	4	—	—	50	10	—	—	—	—	—	—	SNEP: Gold	Nue
"Aimer Déjà"	2002	23	—	—	—	32	—	—	—	—	—			Nue
"Tu es mon autre" (featuring Maurane)	2002	2	—	—	—	5	—	—	—	—	—	—	SNEP: Gold; BEA: Gold	Nue
"Bambina" (featuring Jean-Félix Lalanne)	2003	12	—	—	—	31	—	—	—	—	—	—		En toute intimité
"The Last Goodbye"	2004	—	—	—	—	—	—	—	—	—	—	—		A Wonderful Life
"No Big Deal"	2004	—	—	—	—	—	—	—	—	—	—	—		A Wonderful Life
"La lettre"	2005	11	—	—	13	11	—	—	—	62	—	—		9
"L'homme qui n'avait pas de maison"	2006	54	—	—	—	26	—	—	—	—	—	—		9
"Aime"	2006	9	—	—	7	26	—	—	—	—	—	—		9
"Soleil, Soleil"	2009	39	—	—	13	—	—	—	—	—	—	—		Toutes les femmes en moi
"Toutes les femmes en moi"	2009	69	—	—	—	—	—	—	—	—	—	—		Toutes les femmes en moi
"On s'aimerait tout bas"	2010	19	—	—	—	—	—	—	—	—	—	—		Best of Lara Fabian
"Je t'aime encore"	2012	60	—	—	—	—	—	—	—	—	—	—		Mademoiselle Zhivago
"Deux ils, deux elles"	2013	65	—	—	—	88	—	—	—	—	—	—		Le Secret
"Danse"	2013	—	—	—	—	—	—	—	—	—	—	—		Le Secret
"La vie est là"	2014	89	—	—	—	—	—	—	—	—	—	—		Le Secret
"Make Me Yours Tonight" (with Mustafa Ceceli)	2014	83	—	—	—	151	—	—	—	—	—	—		Non-album single
"Quand je ne chante pas"	2015	22	—	—	—	44	—	—	—	—	—	—		Ma vie dans la tienne
"Ma vie dans la tienne"	2015	32	—	—	—	102	—	—	—	—	—	—		Ma vie dans la tienne
"Razorblade" (with Natalia)	2016	—	—	—	—	—	—	—	—	—	—	—		Non-album single
"Growing Wings"	2017	—	—	—	—	— (Note: "Growing Wings" did not enter the overall French singles chart, but peaked at number 36 on the Téléchargés (downloads) chart.)	—	—	—	—	—	—		Camouflage
"Choose What You Love Most (Let It Kill You)"	2017	—	—	—	—	— (Note: "Choose What You Love Most (Let It Kill You)" did not enter the overall French singles chart, but peaked at number 86 on the Téléchargés (downloads) chart.)	—	—	—	—	—	—		Camouflage
"Papillon"	2018	—	—	—	—	—	—	—	—	—	—	—		Papillon
"Je suis à toi"	2018	—	—	—	—	—	—	—	—	—	—	—		Papillon
"Par amour"	2018	—	—	—	—	—	—	—	—	—	—	—		Papillon
"Nos cœurs à la fenêtre"	2020	16	—	—	—	—	—	—	—	—	—	—		Non-album single
"Ta peine"	2024	28	—	—	—	—	—	—	—	—	—	—		Je suis là
"Je t'ai cherché"	2024	—	—	—	4	—	—	—	—	—	—	—		Je suis là
"Hypersensible"	2025	42	—	—	—	—	—	—	—	—	—	—		Je suis là
"Je veux danser"	2026	45	—	—	—	—	—	—	—	—	—	—		Je suis là
"—" denotes a recording that did not chart or was not released in that territory.

=== As featured artist ===
List of singles, with selected chart positions and certifications
Title	Year	Peak chart positions			Album
Title	Year	BEL	CAN QC	FRA	Album
"L'amour voyage" (Franck Olivier featuring Lara Fabian)	1990	—	45	—	L'amour Voyage
"Un cuore malato" (Gigi d'Alessio featuring Lara Fabian)	2006	6	—	16	Made in Italy
"—" denotes a recording that did not chart or was not released in that territory.

=== Promotional singles ===
List of singles, with selected chart positions and certifications
Title	Year	Peak chart positions			Album
Title	Year	CAN A/C	US Latin	US Latin Pop	Album
"L'Aziza est en pleurs"	1986	—	—	—	Non-album single
"Qui Pense À L'Amour"	1991	—	—	—	Lara Fabian (1991)
"Meu Grande Amor (Si Tu M'aimes)"	1999	—	—	—	Non-album single
"Givin' Up On You"	2000	9	—	—	Lara Fabian
"Sin Ti"	2000	—	—	—	Lara Fabian
"Sola Otra Vez"	2000	—	—	—	Lara Fabian
"Quedate"	2001	—	48	27	Lara Fabian
"Yeliel (My Angel)"	2001	—	—	—	Lara Fabian
"The Dream Within"	2001	—	—	—	Final Fantasy: The Spirits Within
"Ne Lui Parlez Plus d'Elle"	2005	—	—	—	9
"Un Ave Maria"	2005	—	—	—	9
"—" denotes a recording that did not chart or was not released in that territory.

== Other appearances ==
Title	Year	Other artist(s)	Album
"Laisse-moi rêver"	1991	—N/a	La neige et le feu
"Que Dieu aide les exclus"	1996	—N/a	Le Bossu de Notre-Dame
"Surrender to Me"	1997	Richard Marx	Flesh & Bone
"For Always" (solo version)	2001	—N/a	A.I. Artificial Intelligence
"For Always"	2001	Josh Groban	A.I. Artificial Intelligence
"Et maintenant"	2001	Florent Pagny	2
"O Canada"	2001	David Foster & Vancouver Symphony Orchestra	O Canada 2001
"Les ballons rouges"	2003	Serge Lama	Plurielles
"Mais la vie..."	2003	Maurane	Quand l'humain danse
"So in Love"	2004	Mario Frangoulis	De-Lovely
"The Alchemist"	2005	Russell Watson	Amore musica
"The Prayer"	2011	Michael Bolton	Gems
"Je Chante(Io Canto)"	2013	Laura Pausini	20 - The Greatest Hits
"Al Götür Beni"	2014	Mustafa Ceceli	
"You Always Knew"	2017	Les Friction	Dark Matter

== Video albums ==
List of albums
Title	Album details	Certifications
Live 2002	Released: November 12, 2002; Format: DVD; Label: Polydor	SNEP: 3× Platinum
En toute intimité	Released: October 14, 2003; Format: DVD; Label: Polydor	SNEP: 2× Platinum
Un regard 9 Live	Released: October 20, 2006; Format: DVD, digital download; Label: Polydor	
TLFM Font Leur Show	Released: January 18, 2011; Format: DVD, digital download; Label: Polydor	
