= Best of Lara Fabian =

Compilation album by Lara Fabian
- Released: November 15, 2010 (France)
- Recorded: 1994–2010
- Genres: Pop, French pop

Lara Fabian chronology
Mademoiselle Zhivago (2010)	Best of Lara Fabian (2010)	Le Secret (2013)

Singles from Best of Lara Fabian
- 1. "On s'aimerait tout bas" Released: November 2010

Best of Lara Fabian is the first compilation released by Lara Fabian. It debuted at #1 on the Belgium Wallonia chart.

The album focuses mainly on her French success, excluding her first album and previous singles. It includes all her charted singles except "I Am Who I Am", "Love By Grace", "Aimer déjà", "L'homme qui n'avait pas de maison" and "Soleil, soleil." In addition to her hit singles, the album features two new songs: the single "On s'aimerait tout bas" and a virtual duet with Ray Charles, "Ensemble."

The album is also available as a limited edition with a DVD of a Tout les femmes en moi special.

== Track listing ==
=== Disc One ===
#	Title	Written by	Original album	Time
1.	"On s'aimerait tout bas"	Maxime Le Forestier, Stanislas	Best of Lara Fabian	04:01
2.	"Je t'aime"	Rick Allison, Lara Fabian, Parent Mario	Pure	04:22
3.	"Tout"	Rick Allison, Lara Fabian	Pure	04:17
4.	"Si tu m'aimes"	Rick Allison, Lara Fabian	Pure	03:30
5.	"Humana"	Rick Allison, Lara Fabian, Evan Rogers, Carl Sturken	Pure	05:38
6.	"La différence"	Rick Allison, Lara Fabian	Pure	04:14
7.	"Pas sans toi"	Rick Allison, Lara Fabian	Carpe diem	04:44
8.	"Tu t'en vas"	Rick Allison, Lara Fabian, Parent Mario	Carpe diem	03:47
9.	"Je suis malade"	Serge Lama, Alice Dona	Carpe diem	04:24
10.	"Requiem pour un fou" (En duo avec Johnny Hallyday)	G Layani, Gilles Thibaut	Live 1999	04:04
11.	"Perdere l'amore"	Marcello Marrocchi, Giampiero Artegiani	Live 1999	04:58
12.	"Adagio"	Tomaso Albinoni, Rick Allison, Lara Fabian, Dave Pickell	Lara Fabian	04:26
13.	"I Will Love Again"	Paul Barry, Mark Taylor	Lara Fabian	03:44
14.	"Broken Vow"	Walter Afanasieff, Lara Fabian	Lara Fabian	05:14

=== Disc Two ===
#	Title	Written by	Original album	Time
1.	"Ensemble" (En duo avec Ray Charles)	Varda Kakon, Arlette Kotchounian, Pierre Marie dit Mams	Best of Lara Fabian	03:51
2.	"J'y crois encore"	Lara Fabian, Rick Allison	Nue	03:28
3.	"Immortelle"	Lara Fabian, Rick Allison	Nue	05:15
4.	"Tu es mon autre" (En duo avec Maurane)	Lara Fabian, Rick Allison	Nue	03:41
5.	"Je t'aime" (Live)	Lara Fabian, Rick Allison, Parent Mario	En toute intimité	04:43
6.	"Bambina"	Lara Fabian, Janey Clewer	Nue	04:23
7.	"La lettre"	Lara Fabian, Jean-Félix Lalanne	9	03:53
8.	"Ne lui parlez plus d'elle"	Lara Fabian, Jean-Félix Lalanne	9	04:03
9.	"Je me souviens"	Lara Fabian, Jérémy Jouniaux	9	03:17
10.	"Aime"	Lara Fabian, Jérémy Jouniaux	Un regard 9 Live	04:00
11.	"Un cuore malato" (duetto con Gigi D'Alessio)	Mogol, Gigi D'Alessio	Made in Italy	04:40
12.	"Göttingen"	Barbara	Toutes les femmes en moi	05:35
13.	"Toutes les femmes en moi"	Lara Fabian	Toutes les femmes en moi	04:05
14.	"No Big Deal"	Eliot Kennedy, Tim Woodcock, Gary Barlow, Lara Fabian, Rick Allison	A Wonderful Life	03:57
15.	"The Last Goodbye"	Stephen Robson, Wayne Hector	A Wonderful Life	04:19
16.	"I Guess I Loved You"	Anders Bagge, Peer Åström, Lara Fabian, Rick Allison	A Wonderful Life	03:33

== Weekly charts ==
Chart (2010)	Peak position
Belgian Albums (Ultratop Flanders)	96
Belgian Albums (Ultratop Wallonia)	1
Swiss Albums (Schweizer Hitparade)	97
French Albums (SNEP)	172

== Certifications ==
Region	Certification	Certified units/sales
Belgium (BRMA)	Platinum	30,000^{*}
France (SNEP)	Gold	50,000^{*}
^{*} Sales figures based on certification alone.
