= Je t'aime (Lara Fabian song) =

Single by Lara Fabian

from the album Pure
- Released: 1996 (promotional, Canada); 1997 (official, France)
- Genre: Pop; French pop
- Length: 4:23
- Label: Polydor (Universal Music Group); Les Productions Clandestines
- Songwriters: Lara Fabian; Rick Allison
- Producers: Rick Allison; Charles Barbeau

Lara Fabian singles chronology
"Tout" (1997)	"Je t'aime" (1996)	"Humana" (1998)

Music video
- "Je t'aime" by Lara Fabian on YouTube

"Je t'aime" (meaning "I love you") is a song by Belgian-Canadian singer Lara Fabian, co-written by Fabian and producer Rick Allison. The song was released as the second single from her album Pure (1996). It became Fabian's second single to reach the top ten in both France and Belgium, and it was also included in the list of the French Top 100 singles of the 1990s. The song has been performed live by Fabian on most of her tours.

== Writing and development ==
The lyrics were written by Lara Fabian and the music was composed by Rick Allison. Production of the song was handled by Allison and Charles Barbeau.

== Commercial performance ==
Following the success of "Tout", "Je t'aime" became Fabian's second single to reach a peak position in the top ten in France and Belgium. In France, the song debuted on the chart on the first day of November 1997 at number 24. After three weeks, it entered the top ten at number eight, and later reached its peak position (number six) for three consecutive weeks. The song spent 13 weeks in the top ten and a total of 31 weeks on the chart.

In Belgium, the song also entered the chart at number 24 in mid-November 1997. It spent seven consecutive weeks in the top ten, reached a peak position of number six, and remained on the chart for 22 weeks. A re-release of the single reached number 42 and spent two weeks on the chart in late November 2010.

Along with "Tout", "Je t'aime" was Fabian's second and final single to appear on the list of the 100 best-selling singles in France during the 1990s, with reported sales of about 501,000 copies.

== Live performances and cover versions ==
"Je t'aime" is frequently performed by Fabian on tour. Live versions of the song are available on live albums such as Live 1999, Live 2002 and En toute intimité (2003). Other notable live performances include the 1998 Victoires de la Musique ceremony, the 1999 World Music Awards ceremony, and a performance at the Royal Albert Hall in 2011.

In 2017, Tony Carreira and Lara Fabian recorded a Portuguese language version of the song under the new title "Um amor assim".

== Track listings ==
- Official French single, Polydor (1997)
1. "Je t'aime" – 4:23
2. "Alléluia" – 4:09
- Canadian promotional single, Arpège Musique (1996)
1. "Je t'aime" – 4:23
2. "Alléluia" – 4:09

== Credits and personnel ==
"Je t'aime"

- Lara Fabian – lyrics, lead vocals
- Rick Allison – music, production
- Charles Barbeau – production, arrangement, programming, piano
- Benoît Clément – drums
- Rémy Malo – bass
- Pierre Dumont Gauthier – guitar
- Bruce Gaitsch – nylon-string guitar solo

== Charts ==
=== Weekly charts ===
Chart (1997–98)	Peak position
Belgium (Ultratop 50 Wallonia)	6
France (SNEP)	6

=== Year-end charts ===
Chart (1997)	Position
Belgium (Ultratop Wallonia)	35
France (SNEP)	46
Chart (1998)	Position
Belgium (Ultratop Wallonia)	61
France (SNEP)	31

=== All-time charts ===
Chart (1995–2020)	Position
Belgium (Ultratop Top 1000 Wallonia)	442

== Certifications ==
Region	Certification	Certified units/sales
Belgium (BRMA)	Gold	25,000^{*}
France	—	501,000
^{*} Sales figures based on certification alone.

== See also ==
- French Top 100 singles of the 1990s
