= Lara Fabian (disambiguation) =

Lara Fabian is a Belgian-Italian international singer. It is also the name of two albums by that singer:

- Lara Fabian (1991 album) (in French)
- Lara Fabian (2000 album) (in English)
