= Camouflage (Lara Fabian album) =

Studio album by Lara Fabian
- Released: October 6, 2017
- Recorded: 2017
- Studio: Denebi Studios (Stockholm, Sweden); 9 Productions Brussels (Belgium)
- Genre: Pop; EDM; Europop; house; techno
- Length: 40:29
- Label: 9 Productions; Odacity Music; Sony Music; Warner; Musicor
- Producer: Moh Denebi; Matt M Ersin

Lara Fabian chronology
Ma vie dans la tienne (2015)	Camouflage (2017)	Papillon (2019)

Singles from Camouflage
- 1. "Growing Wings" Released: August 4, 2017; 2. "Choose What You Love Most (Let It Kill You)" Released: September 8, 2017; 3. "Chameleon" Released: February 2, 2018

Camouflage is the thirteenth studio album and fourth English-language album by pop singer Lara Fabian. It was released on October 6, 2017. The first single from the album, "Growing Wings", was released on August 4, 2017.

Fabian embarked on the Camouflage World Tour in February 2018. The tour brought music from the album to the stage, together with her international hits for 21 dates across the world, ending in Paris in June 2018.

== Background ==
The album has been developed and produced under the artistic direction of producer Matt Ersin in Stockholm, Los Angeles and Brussels. All the 12 songs are written and composed by Fabian together with Moh Denebi and Sharon Vaughn. It uses classical orchestration and electro-pop production to accompany Fabian's vocals. The album's title is taken from one of its songs.

Fabian's first English album was released in 1999, Lara Fabian. In 2004 she released her second English album, A Wonderful Life. Her third English album was an acoustic album with covers of some of her favourite artists, Every Woman in Me, released in 2009.

== Singles ==
"Growing Wings" was released as the lead single on August 4, 2017, and a remix of the song by Offer Nissim was released on August 11, 2017. A video for the song was released on August 13 directed by Senol Korkmaz and produced by Matt M. Ersin and Odacity.

On September 8, 2017, "Choose What You Love Most (Let It Kill You)" was released as the second single from the album. On September 24, 2017, a music video for the song was released, directed by Senol Korkmaz and produced by Matt M. Ersin.

"We Are The Flyers" was released as a single in Germany, and elsewhere, "Chameleon" was presented as third single in February 2018 with a new version produced by Tel-Aviv based music producer Tomer G. An additional Remix was produced for "Chameleon" by French music producer Tom York.

== Track listing ==
All tracks written by Lara Fabian, Sharon Vaughn, and Moh Denebi. Music producer of all tracks Moh Denebi, producer: Matt M.Ersin

Standard Edition
No.	Title	Length
1.	"Growing Wings"	2:57
2.	"Chameleon"	3:19
3.	"If I Let You Love Me"	3:35
4.	"Choose What You Love Most (Let It Kill You)"	3:53
5.	"We Are the Flyers"	4:05
6.	"Painting in the Rain"	3:27
7.	"Camouflage"	3:11
8.	"I'm Breakable"	2:35
9.	"Keep the Animals Away"	3:32
10.	"We Are the Storm"	3:39
11.	"Perfect"	3:00
12.	"Communify"	3:16

== Charts ==
=== Weekly charts ===
Chart (2017)	Peak position
Belgian Albums (Ultratop Flanders)	57
Belgian Albums (Ultratop Wallonia)	4
French Albums (SNEP)	17
Swiss Albums (Schweizer Hitparade)	27

=== Year-end charts ===
Chart (2017)	Position
Belgian Albums (Ultratop Wallonia)	79

== See also ==
- Lara Fabian discography
