= Live 1999 =

Live 1999 may refer to:

- Burning Japan Live 1999 live album by the Swedish melodic death metal band Arch Enemy

== See also ==
- Live (Lara Fabian album)
