= En Toute Intimité =

En toute intimité

Live album by Lara Fabian
- Released: October 14, 2003 (France)
- Recorded: February 2 & 3, 2003
- Genre: Live album, acoustic, French pop, pop
- Length: 75:45
- Label: Polydor

Lara Fabian chronology
Live 2002 (2002)	En toute intimité (2003)	A Wonderful Life (2004)

DVD cover
- DVD cover

En toute intimité is the title of both the CD and DVD from Lara Fabian's 2003 acoustic concerts at the Olympia in Paris. Both the CD and DVD were recorded during the concerts on February 2 & 3 2003.

This intimate, piano-based concert showcases acoustic versions of songs from Fabian's previous studio albums as well as many classic songs in Italian, French and English previously not recorded by Fabian. Many of Fabian's songs such as "J'y crois encore" were completely re-arranged to fit the acoustic sound.

On the CD and DVD, alongside some of Fabian's most remarkable hits and album tracks, are classics such as: Dalla's "Caruso" (performed by Fabian many times before); Jevetta Steele's "Calling you" from the Bagdad Café soundtrack; French singer Renaud's "Mistral Gagnant"; and a medley from the worldwide known Francophone musical "Starmania". The DVD contains some tracks which were left off the CD. Most notably, the DVD contains Fabian's homage to Celine Dion's biggest French classic "Pour que tu m'aimes encore". Fabian makes it clear how much respect and appreciation she had for the Canadian singer, despite years of media comparisons between the two. Also, Fabian took advantage of the intimacy in the room and closeness with the audience to share her passion for acting, creating a new dimension to many of her performances. Another highlight found only on the DVD is Fabian's rendition of Lama's "Je Suis Malade". This popular song was included on her album Carpe diem, recorded nine years before. This time around her performance of the song was a mixture of a spoken monologue and theatrical singing accompanied by a piano.

== CD track listing ==
#	Title	Written by	Time
1.	"J'y crois encore"	Lara Fabian, Rick Allison	05:04
2.	"Comme ils disent"	Charles Aznavour	05:26
3.	"Caruso"	Lucio Dalla	05:01
4.	"S'en aller"	Lara Fabian, Rick Allison	03:46
5.	"Voir un ami pleurer"	Jacques Brel	04:26
6.	"Je t'aime"	Lara Fabian, Rick Allison	04:41
7.	"Je suis mon coeur"	Charles Lidon, Daniel Lavoie	05:22
8.	"Addio del passato"	Francesco Maria Piave, Giuseppe Verdi	05:28
9.	"Mistral gagnant"	Renaud	04:10
10.	"Si tu m'aimes" / "Parce que tu pars"	Lara Fabian, Rick Allison	05:27
11.	"Tu es mon autre" - duet with Maurane	Lara Fabian, Rick Allison	04:19
12.	"Medley Starmania"	Luc Plamondon, Michel Berger	05:55
13.	"Calling you"	Robert Telson	05:27
14.	"Tout"	Lara Fabian, Rick Allison	03:57
15.	"Immortelle"	Lara Fabian, Rick Allison	03:15
16.	"Bambina" - guitar/voice version with Jean-Félix Lalanne	Lara Fabian, Rick Allison	03:59

== DVD track listing ==
1. "Bambina" - intro
2. "J'y crois encore"
3. "Comme ils disent"
4. "Caruso"
5. "S'en aller"
6. "Aimer déjà"
7. "Voir un ami pleurer"
8. "Je t'aime"
9. "Pour que tu m'aimes encore"
10. "Je suis mon coeur"
11. "Addio del passato"
12. "Mistral gagnant"
13. "Si tu m'aimes" / "Parce que tu pars"
14. "Tu es mon autre" - duet with Maurane
15. "Medley Starmania"
16. "Calling you"
17. "Tout"
18. "Je suis malade"
19. "Immortelle"
20. "Bambina" - guitar/voice version with Jean-Félix Lalanne

== Charts ==
Chart (2003)	Peak position
Belgian Albums (Ultratop Wallonia)	1
French Albums (SNEP)	6
Swiss Albums (Schweizer Hitparade)	31

== Certifications and sales ==
Region	Certification	Certified units/sales
France (SNEP)	Platinum	300,000^{*}
^{*} Sales figures based on certification alone.
