= Un regard 9 Live =

Live album by Lara Fabian
- Released: October 2006
- Recorded: 29 March 2006
- Genre: Live, French pop
- Length: 62:23 (CD)
- Label: Polydor

Lara Fabian chronology
9 (2005)	Un regard 9 Live (2006)	Toutes les femmes en moi (2009)

Un Regard 9 is the title of both the CD and DVD from Lara Fabian's 2005/2006 tour of the same name which followed her 2005 studio release, titled 9. The CD and DVD were both released separately and together as a limited edition box set. The CD and DVD were both recorded live on 29 March 2006 at the Zenith in Paris. The CD presents 15 live performances plus a brand new song, "Aime," recorded in a studio in Montreal, Quebec. This song has been recorded in both English and French, though the latter version is the only one officially released so far. It was initially presented live during a few concerts in Belgium as gift for her native Belgium fans, but the enthusiastic response and feedback was so huge that Fabian felt she should record the song and include it on a forthcoming release.

The entire live concert features songs from Lara's latest studio album 9 and old songs all performed acoustically. Certain songs like "Tout" for instance were completely re-arranged to fit with this new sound and the concept of the show. A stand-out moment during the concert is the homage Fabian makes to her idol Barbra Streisand, singing "Papa Can You Hear Me" and "A Piece of Sky", both taken from Streisand's 1983 movie Yentl. These two songs had been previously performed in medley by Fabian, back in 1997, during a concert in Québec at the time Pure was released. This time around, these songs get the chance to fully showcase Fabian's amazing vocals on a record. On the DVD one can find tracks that were intentionally left off the CD, like "Je T'Aime" and two English songs taken from Fabian's two English records, "Broken Vow" and "I Guess I Loved You". According to Fabian, these tracks had a more visual aspect on them than just being simply listened on a record. Also presented on this DVD is the nearly 10-minute performance of "Humana", a track and single from Pure. "Humana" went longer than expected during the concert due to the enthusiasm of the public.

== CD track listing ==
#	Title	Written by	Time
1.	"Aime" - studio recording	Lara Fabian, Jérémy Jouniaux	04:00
2.	"Les Homéricains"	Lara Fabian, Jean-Félix Lalanne	03:30
3.	"J'y crois encore"	Lara Fabian, Rick Allison	04:52
4.	"Il ne manquait que toi "	Lara Fabian, Jean-Félix Lalanne	04:29
5.	"Tu es mon autre"	Lara Fabian, Rick Allison	03:52
6.	"Si tu n'as pas d'amour"	Jean-Félix Lalanne	03:40
7.	"Silence"	Lara Fabian, Rick Allison	03:01
8.	"Un Ave Maria"	Lara Fabian, Jean-Félix Lalanne	03:59
9.	"Immortelle"	Lara Fabian, Rick Allison	03:05
10.	"Tout"	Lara Fabian, Rick Allison	03:49
11.	"Le Tour du Monde"	Lara Fabian, Jean-Félix Lalanne	03:18
12.	"L'homme qui n'avait pas de maison"	Lara Fabian, Jean-Félix Lalanne	03:47
13.	"La Lettre"	Lara Fabian, Jean-Félix Lalanne	05:58
14.	"Papa, Can You Hear Me?"	Alan Bergman, Marilyn Bergman, Michel Legrand	03:08
15.	"A Piece of Sky"	Alan Bergman, Marilyn Bergman, Michel Legrand	04:07
16.	"Je me souviens"	Lara Fabian, Jérémy Jouniaux	03:52

== DVD track listing ==
1. Je t’aime
2. Les Homéricains
3. J’y crois encore
4. Il ne manquait que toi
5. Tu es mon autre
6. Si tu n’as pas d’amour
7. Silence
8. Speranza
9. I Guess I Loved You
10. Broken Vow
11. Humana
12. Un Ave Maria
13. Immortelle
14. Bambina
15. Tout
16. Le Tour du Monde
17. L'homme qui n'avait pas de maison
18. La Lettre
19. Papa, Can You Hear Me?
20. A Piece Of Sky
21. Je me souviens

== Charts ==
Chart (2006)	Peak position
Belgian Albums (Ultratop Wallonia)	3
French Albums (SNEP)	7
Swiss Albums (Schweizer Hitparade)	41
