= Papillon (Lara Fabian album) =

Studio album by Lara Fabian
- Released: February 8, 2019
- Recorded: 2018
- Studio: Dot Studios (Stockholm, Sweden)
- Genre: Pop; electronica; Europop
- Length: 39:27
- Language: French
- Label: 9 Productions; Odacity Music; Warner
- Producer: Moh Denebi; Matt M Ersin

Lara Fabian chronology
Camouflage (2017)	Papillon (2019)	Lockdown Sessions (2020)

Singles from Papillon
- 1. "Papillon" Released: October 5, 2018; 2. "Je suis à toi" Released: November 30, 2018

Papillon is the fourteenth studio album and tenth French album by Lara Fabian. The album was released on February 8, 2019. The first single from the album, "Papillon", was released on October 5, 2018.

== Singles ==
"Papillon" was released as the lead single on October 5, 2018. A video for the song was released the same day directed by Romeo & Fils and produced by Matt M. Ersin.

On November 30, 2018, "Je Suis à Toi" was released along with the pre-order of the album. A video was released December 21, 2018 directed by Romeo & Fils.

== Track listing ==
All tracks written by Lara Fabian, Sharon Vaughn, and Moh Denebi. Music producer of all tracks Moh Denebi, producer: Matt M.Ersin

No.	Title	Length
1.	"Papillon"	3:58
2.	"Je suis à toi"	3:19
3.	"Changer le jeu"	3:24
4.	"Par amour"	3:40
5.	"Je ne t'aime plus"	3:16
6.	"Alien"	3:09
7.	"Pardonne"	3:16
8.	"Superman"	3:38
9.	"Sans ton amour"	4:11
10.	"L'Animal"	4:09
11.	"Alcyon"	3:27

== Bonus edition "Papillon(s)" ==
On June 5, 2020, Fabian released the bonus edition, "Papillon(s)" with three new unedited tracks.

All tracks written by Lara Fabian and Sharon Vaughn. Tracks 12 and 13 also written by Moh Denebi and Elodie Hesme. Track 14 also written by Igor Krutoy.

No.	Title	Length
12.	"En chemin"	3:06
13.	"C'est l'heure"	3:26
14.	"Undefeated Love"	4:40

== Charts ==
=== Weekly charts ===
Chart (2019)	Peak position
Belgian Albums (Ultratop Flanders)	56
Belgian Albums (Ultratop Wallonia)	2
Canadian Albums (Billboard)	20
French Albums (SNEP)	12
Swiss Albums (Schweizer Hitparade)	58

=== Year-end charts ===
Chart (2019)	Position
Belgian Albums (Ultratop Wallonia)	44
Chart (2020)	Position
Belgian Albums (Ultratop Wallonia)	200
