= Magalie Vaé =

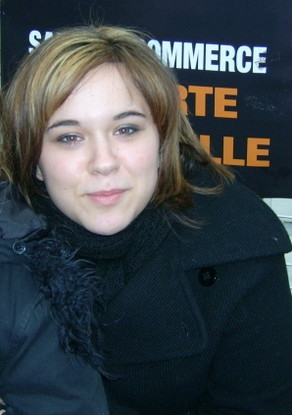
- Magalie Vaé in Saint-Lô, 24 December 2006

Background information
- Born: Magalie Bonneau; 6 January 1987 (age 39)
- Origin: Gonesse, France
- Genres: French Pop, Pop, MOR
- Occupation: Singer-songwriter
- Years active: 2005–present
- Labels: Universal / Mercury (2005–2010); Natsis Music / Midlands Artistic (2010-présent)
- Website: magalievae.net

Magalie Vaé is the stage name of Magalie Bonneau, a French singer born on 6 January 1987 in Gonesse (Val-d'Oise). She was the winner of the fifth series of the French Star Academy TV talent show.

== Biography ==
Vaé grew up in Le Thillay, in Val-d'Oise. In September 2005, she was selected to participate to Star Academy France. Four months later she ended up winning one million euros and a record deal to release her debut studio album. On 6 February 2006, Magalie went to Canada to record her album, produced by Rick Allison. The first single, Je ne suis qu'une chanson (I am but a song) was released a month later. Her self-titled album was released on 3 April 2006 to generally positive reviews.

In 2009 the French press reported that Magalie's second album had been recorded for over a year but got pushed back due to contractual disagreements with Universal Music.

In 2010, Vaé signed with Midlands Artistic. Her second album was scheduled for release in 2011. In January 2011, she released the single "L'homme shampooing", followed by "La nausée" in May. In November 2011, she gave birth to her first child. Her second album Métamorphoses was finally released in February 2014. A third single, "La Fièvre acheteuse", was released in January 2015.

== Discography ==
=== Albums ===
Year	Title	Peak chart positions	
Year	Title	FRA	BEL WAL
2006	Magalie Vaé: Released: 6 April 2006; Label: Universal Music France	13	23
2014	Métamorphoses: Released: 19 February 2014; Label: Midlands Artistic	–	–

=== Singles ===
Year	Title	Peak chart positions			Album
Year	Title	FRA	BEL WAL	SWI	Album
2006	"Je ne suis qu'une chanson"	5	6	63	Magalie Vaé
2006	"Qui a mérité ça ?"	31	16	–	Magalie Vaé
2011	"L'homme shampooing"	–	–	–	Métamorphoses
2011	"La nausée"	–	–	–	Métamorphoses
2015	"La fièvre acheteuse"	–	–	–	Métamorphoses

Preceded by Grégory Lemarchal	Winner of Star Academy France; 2005	Succeeded by Cyril Cinélu
