= Croire =

1988 song by Lara Fabian

Single by Lara Fabian
- Language: French
- Released: 1988
- Composer: Jacques Cardona
- Lyricist: Alain Garcia

Eurovision Song Contest 1988 entry
- Country: Luxembourg
- Artist: Lara Fabian
- Language: French
- Composer: Jacques Cardona
- Lyricist: Alain Garcia
- Conductor: Régis Dupré

Finals performance
- Final result: 4th
- Final points: 90

Entry chronology
- ◄ "Amour, Amour" (1987)
- "Monsieur" (1989) ►

"Croire" (French pronunciation: [kʁwaʁ]; "To Trust") is a song performed in French by Belgian singer Lara Fabian, written by Alain Garcia and composed by Jacques Cardona. The song represented Luxembourg in the Eurovision Song Contest 1988, and became a hit in Europe selling nearly 500,000 copies.

== Lyrics ==
The song is a ballad, with Fabian singing that she wants to believe in the good of humanity, rather than its dark side. She sings that "we have love within us", which is her central belief. Fabian also recorded the song in English and German, as "Trust" and "Glaub'" respectively.

== Eurovision Song Contest ==
"Croire" was performed at the 1988 edition of the Eurovision Song Contest by Fabian as an 18 year old emerging artist, who years later became internationally established.

As a child and a teenager, Fabian composed her melodies and covered others songs on the piano, performed in small show rooms around Brussels and took part in amateurs contests in Belgium during the 1980s, winning several prizes. Her win at "Le Tremplin de Bruxelles" gave her the opportunity to record her first single, the double track "L'Aziza est en pleurs" / "Il y avait", in 1986. After listening to both songs, producer Hubert Terheggen hurried to a piano-bar in Belgium where Fabian performed, and asked her to represent RTL TV channel for Luxembourg in the Eurovision Song Contest 1988. "Croire", composed by Jacques Cardona and Alain Garcia, was then presented to Fabian.

At Eurovision the song was conducted by Régis Dupré and performed seventeenth, following Belgium's Reynaert with "Laissez briller le soleil" and preceding Italy's Luca Barbarossa with "Vivo (Ti scrivo)". At the close of voting, it had received 90 points, placing 4th in a field of 21. This is Luxembourg's last entry in Eurovision to score a top five as well as a top ten position. It was succeeded as Luxembourgish representative at the 1989 contest by Park Café with "Monsieur".

== Other releases ==
In 1999, "Croire" was included as a bonus track on Fabian's eponymously titled debut album, originally released in 1991. The song is also included in a compilation album of French-language Eurovision Song Contest entries, titled Eurovision: Les plus belles chansons françaises, released in 2000.
