= Tu es mon autre =

Single by Lara Fabian and Maurane

from the album Nue
- B-side: "Instrumental + Live"
- Released: October 2002
- Recorded: 2002
- Genre: Pop
- Length: 3:42
- Label: Universal Music, Polydor
- Songwriters: Lara Fabian, Rick Allison
- Producer: Rick Allison

Lara Fabian singles chronology
"Aimer Dejá" (2002)	"Tu es mon autre" (2002)	"Bambina" (2003)

"Tu es mon autre" is a 2002 song recorded as a duet by Belgian singers Lara Fabian and Maurane. It was the fifth and last single from Fabian's fifth studio album Nue, and was released in October 2002. The song achieved success in France and Belgium (Wallonia) where it was a top five hit, becoming one of both singers' most successful hits.

== Reception ==
The song was nominated in the category 'Song of the year' at the Victoires de la Musique.

In France, the single was charted for 31 weeks, eight of them in the top ten, including a peak at No. 5 on 26 October 2002. In Belgium (Wallonia), the single debuted at No. 6 on 2 November 2002, then reached number two for three weeks, being blocked by Las Ketchup's hit "The Ketchup Song"; it totalled 14 weeks in the top ten and 21 weeks on the chart (top 40). The song achieved a moderate success in Switzerland, but remained in the top 100 for 19 weeks.

== Performances ==
In this song, Fabian and Maurane sing all the lyrics simultaneously. In the music video, the two singers are performing the song in front of each other, in a room full of mirrors. It deals with the themes of friendship and alter ego.

"Tu es mon autre" was performed many times with many other artists, including Fabian's longtime collaborator Rick Allison (who participated in the song writing and production), during the singer's 2001/2002 tour. Both say to one another before the performance "[...] a song that I wrote for you, and that you wrote for me [...]". The song was thus available in its live version on Live 2002 (2002), En Toute Intimité and Un regard 9 Live (2009). In 2012, Fabian performed the song with Indonesian singer Anggun during a concert special on the MTV Lebanon.

== Track listings ==
- CD single
1. "Tu es mon autre" – 3:42
2. "Tu es mon autre" (instrumental) – 3:42
3. "Tu es mon autre" (live) – 4:37

== Charts ==
=== Weekly charts ===
Chart (2002/03)	Peak position
Belgian (Wallonia) Singles Chart	2
Europe (European Hot 100 Singles)	18
French SNEP Singles Chart	5
Swiss Singles Chart	23

=== Year-end charts ===
Chart (2002)	Position
Belgian (Wallonia) Singles Chart	19
French Singles Chart	35
Chart (2003)	Position
Belgian (Wallonia) Singles Chart	65
French Singles Chart	74

== Certifications ==
Region	Certification	Certified units/sales
Belgium (BRMA)	Gold	25,000^{*}
France (SNEP)	Gold	250,000^{*}
^{*} Sales figures based on certification alone.
