= İrem Derici =

Turkish singer and songwriter (born 1987)

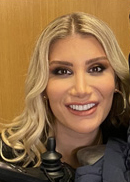
- Born: 21 March 1987 (age 39); Istanbul, Turkey
- Education: Mimar Sinan Fine Arts University; Istanbul Bilgi University
- Occupation: Singer
- Musical career
- Genres: Pop; dancepop; electropop
- Instruments: Piano
- Years active: 2012–present
- Labels: DMC; GNL; İD
- Formerly of: Monopop
- Website: iremderici.com

İrem Derici (born 21 March 1987) is a Turkish singer and songwriter. From the early 2010s she became famous in Turkey through her hit singles "Zorun Ne Sevgilim", "Kalbimin Tek Sahibine" and "Dantel".

== Life and career ==
İrem Derici was born on 21 March 1987, her parents are Hulusi Derici and Jale Ediz. At the age of four she started to play piano, and later had piano lessons at Mimar Sinan Fine Arts University State Conservatory High School. She graduated sociology at Istanbul Bilgi University, and also studied master of Marketing Communication.

She participated in the singing competition O Ses Türkiye and advanced to the semi-final stage. Meanwhile, she began to perform at different places in Turkey with a group named Monopop.

With the release of the single "Bensiz Yapamazsın" in 2012 Derici started her professional music career. In May 2013, her second single "Düşler Ülkesinin Gelgit Akıllısı" was released. In September 2013, her first maxi single İki was released. The album's first music video was made for "Sevgi Olsun Taştan Olsun", followed by another music video for "Zorun Ne Sevgilim". "Zorun Ne Sevgilim" remained number two on Türkçe Top 20 for three weeks. Derici then released a new single titled "Neredesin Sen?", written by Neşet Ertaş.

In 2014, her single "Kalbimin Tek Sahibine" became a massive hit in Turkey and was viewed by millions on YouTube. In the same year her second maxi single Üç was released, and two music videos were made for the songs "Bir miyiz?" and "Nabza Göre Şerbet". "Nabza Göre Şerbet" ranked third on Turkey's official music chart. In 2015, two more singles "Değmezsin Ağlamaya" and "Aşk Eşittir Biz" were released in March and September respectively. "Aşk Eşittir Biz" became a number one hit in Turkey. In the same year, Derici collaborated with Emrah Karaduman in his album Tozduman and was featured in the song "Nerden Bilecekmiş".

Derici, released her first studio album Dantel in February 2016 under the label GNL Entertainment. The song "Dantel" from the album, was the number-one hit in Turkey for four continuous weeks. The second music video for the album was made for the song "Evlenmene Bak" in which Sinan Akçıl appeared. Subsequently, a third and forth music video were made for the songs "Dur Yavaş" and "Bana Hiçbir Şey Olmaz".

From 13 September 2014 to 22 March 2016, Derici was married to the arranger Rıza Esendemir. From 11 July to 21 September 2016, she served as a judge on the second season of the singing competition Rising Star Türkiye.

In 2017 she collaborated with Mustafa Ceceli in his album Zincirimi Kırdı Aşk and was featured in the song "Kıymetlim". Together with Gökçe, Derici was featured in the music video for Yonca Evcimik's new single "Kendine Gel". In the same year, she released a new single titled "Tektaş", which ranked eighth on Turkey's official music chart. Later she voiced the song "Sevimli" for the soundtrack of the movie Bekâr Bekir. In November, Derici released the single "Bazı Aşklar Yarım Kalmalı", which rose to the third position on the official chart in Turkey.

In August 2018, her second studio album, Sabıka Kaydı, was released. A music video was published on the same day for the album's lead single "Ben Tek Siz Hepiniz". In February 2019, Derici released her tenth single "Meftun", and on 31 May 2019 she released her first cover album Mest Of, which contains eight popular Turkish songs from the 90s. Mayk Şişman from Milliyet believed that Derici's new album was 'successful as an idea' and named "Bende Hüküm Sür" as its best piece.

== Discography ==
=== Studio albums ===
Year	Album	Sales and certifications
2016	Dantel: Released: 12 February 2016; Format: MC, CD, digital download	
2018	Sabıka Kaydı: Released: 10 August 2018; Format: MC, CD, digital download	

=== Cover albums ===
Year	Album	Sales and certifications
2019	Mest Of: Released: 31 May 2019; Format: MC, CD, digital download	
2024	Ex'ten Next: Released: 5 January 2024; Format: Digital download	

=== Compilation albums ===
List of albums
Year	Album
2015	Tüm Şarkıları: Released: 14 August 2015; Format: MC, CD, digital download

=== EPs ===
List of albums
Year	Album
2013	İki: Released: 18 September 2013; Format: MC, CD, digital download
2014	Üç: Released: 24 June 2014; Format: MC, CD, digital download
2015	Değmezsin Ağlamaya: Released: 24 March 2015; Format: MC, CD, digital download
2020	Senin Hastan: 13 November 2020; Format: CD, digital download

=== Singles ===
List of singles
Year	Title
2012	"Bensiz Yapamazsın": Released: 9 November 2012; Format: CD, digital download
2013	"Düşler Ülkesinin Gelgit Akıllısı": Released: 31 May 2013; Format: CD, digital download
2014	"Neredesin Sen": Released: 10 February 2014; Format: digital download
2014	"Kalbimin Tek Sahibine": Released: 24 April 2014; Format: CD, digital download
2015	"Aşk Eşittir Biz": Released: 9 September 2015; Format: CD, digital download
2016	"Bambaşka Biri" (featuring Yasin Keleş): Released: 3 June 2016; Format: digital download
2017	"Tektaş": Released: 21 April 2017; Format: digital download
2017	"Sevimli (Bekar Bekir Original Film Music)": Released: 10 August 2017; Format: digital download
2017	"Bazı Aşklar Yarım Kalmalı": Released: 3 November 2017; Format: digital download
2018	"Hadi Gel": Released: 14 February 2018; Format: digital download
2019	"Meftun": Released: 26 February 2019; Format: digital download
2020	"Dudak Payı": Released: 17 April 2020; Format: digital download
2021	"Vazgeçtim İnan": Released: 1 January 2021; Format: digital download
2021	"Affeder mi Aşk Bizi?" (featuring Alper Atakan): Released: 13 August 2021; Format: digital download
2021	"Konu O Olunca" (featuring Genco Ecer): Released: 17 December 2021; Format: digital download
2022	"Belki" (featuring Cem Belevi): Released: 4 March 2022; Format: digital download
2022	"Ara Sıra": Released: 29 April 2022; Format: digital download
2022	"Rastgele" (featuring Mustafa Ceceli, Burak Bulut & Kurtuluş Kuş): Released: 26 May 2022; Format: digital download
2022	"Alev Alev" (featuring Burak Bulut & Kurtuluş Kuş): Released: 7 October 2022; Format: digital download
2022	"Yaz Gülü": Released: 25 November 2022; Format: digital download
2023	"Papatya" (featuring Eda Sakiz): Released: 19 January 2023; Format: digital download
2023	"Ara Sıra" (Acoustic): Released: 12 May 2023; Format: digital download
2023	"Affeder mi Aşk Bizi" (Acoustic): Released: 19 May 2023; Format: digital download
2023	"Güya" (Acoustic) (featuring Onurr): Released: 26 May 2023; Format: digital download
2023	"Yaz Gülü" (Acoustic): Released: 2 June 2023; Format: digital download
2023	"Meftun" (Acoustic): Released: 9 June 2023; Format: digital download
2023	"Gizli Sevda" (Acoustic): Released: 16 June 2023; Format: digital download
2023	"Çok Sevmek Yasaklanmalı" (Acoustic): Released: 23 June 2023; Format: digital download
2023	"Değmezsin Ağlamaya" (Acoustic): Released: 30 June 2023; Format: digital download
2023	"Bitter": Released: 7 July 2023; Format: digital download
2023	"Alıştım Zehrine": Released: 13 October 2023; Format: digital download
2023	"Sevmek Bizim İşimiz" (Acoustic): Released: 29 December 2023; Format: digital download
2024	"Delil": Released: 9 February 2024; Format: digital download
2024	"Milyonda Bir": Released: 22 March 2024; Format: digital download
2024	"Beni Bilen İyi Biliyor": Released: 31 May 2024; Format: digital download
2024	"Gidelim mi Buralardan": Released: 2 August 2024; Format: digital download
2024	"Deli Yangınım" (featuring Emrah Karaduman): Released: 13 December 2024; Format: digital download
2025	"Kabul": Released: 27 June 2025; Format: digital download
2025	"Bu Defa Başka": Released: 17 October 2025; Format: digital download

=== Other works ===
List of songs, year of publication and albums's names
Song	Year	Album
"Nereden Bilecekmiş" (with Emrah Karaduman)	2015	Toz Duman
"Gir Kanıma" (with Harun Kolçak)	2016	Çeyrek Asır
"Kıymetlim" (with Mustafa Ceceli)	2017	Zincirimi Kırdı Aşk
"Bir Tanedir" (with Sinan Akçıl, Miri Yusuf, and Sinan Ceceli)	2017	Söyle
"Kendine Gel" (with Yonca Evcimik and Gökçe)	2017	Kendine Gel
"Sana İhtiyacım Var" (with What Da Funk)	2017	WDF1
"Cahil Cesareti" (with Kaan Karamaya)	2018	Cahil Cesareti
"Bin Dereden"	2018	Yıldız Tilbe'nin Yıldızlı Şarkıları
"Fırtınalar"	2019	Aşkın'ın Şarkıları
"Çok Sevmek Yasaklanmalı" (with Mustafa Ceceli and Sinan Akçıl)	2020	Piyanist
"Teşekkürler" (with Sinan Akçıl)	2020	Piyanist
"İyi Değilim" (with Sinan Akçıl)	2022	Piyanist 2
"Efkâr Gecesi" (with Mustafa Ceceli and Sinan Akçıl)	2023	Piyanist 3 (Next Generation)
"Nedenini Sorma" (with Mili B, KERRO and Sinan Akçıl)	2023	Piyanist 3 (Next Generation)
"Yaz Günü"	2023	Serdar Ortaç Şarkıları Vol. 2

== Filmography ==
Cinema

- Bekâr Bekir (2017)

Television

- O Ses Türkiye (2011) – Herself (contestant)
- İşte Benim Stilim (2016) – Herself (guest judge)
- İrem Derici ile Eğlenmene Bak (2017) – Herself (presenter)
- Jet Sosyete (2018) – Herself
- Kalk Gidelim (2019) – Herself
- Menajerimi Ara (2020/2021) – Herself
