= Make Me Yours Tonight =

"Make Me Yours Tonight (Al Götür Beni)"

Single by Lara Fabian & Mustafa Ceceli

from the album Kalpten
- Released: 4 August 2014
- Recorded: 2014
- Length: 3:32
- Label: Odacity; 9 (in Belgium)
- Songwriter(s): Anthony James; Yiorgos Bellapaisiotis; Sezen Aksu
- Producer(s): Matt M. Ersin; Jean-François Veneziano; Mustafa Ceceli

Lara Fabian singles chronology
"La vie est là" (2014)	"Make Me Yours Tonight (Al Götür Beni)" (2014)	"Quand Je Ne Chanté Pas" (2015)

Mustafa Ceceli singles chronology
"Make Me Yours Tonight" (2014)

Music video
- "Make Me Yours Tonight" on YouTube

"Make Me Yours Tonight" is a 2014 duet by Belgo-Canadian singer Lara Fabian and Turkish singer Mustafa Ceceli. The title, "Make Me Yours Tonight" is written by Anthony James and Yiorgos Bellapaisiotis. A bilingual English/Turkish version was also made as "Make Me Yours Tonight // Al Götür Beni" (the Turkish title meaning Take Me Away is written by Sezen Aksu). In Turkey, the Turkish version of the song reached position 1 in the physical single sales, and position 2 in the digital sales (Kral Pop Charts).

== Charts ==
Chart (2014)	Peak position
Belgium (Ultratip Bubbling Under Wallonia)	33
France (SNEP)	151
