= Gökçe (singer) =

Turkish singer, songwriter and composer (born 1979)

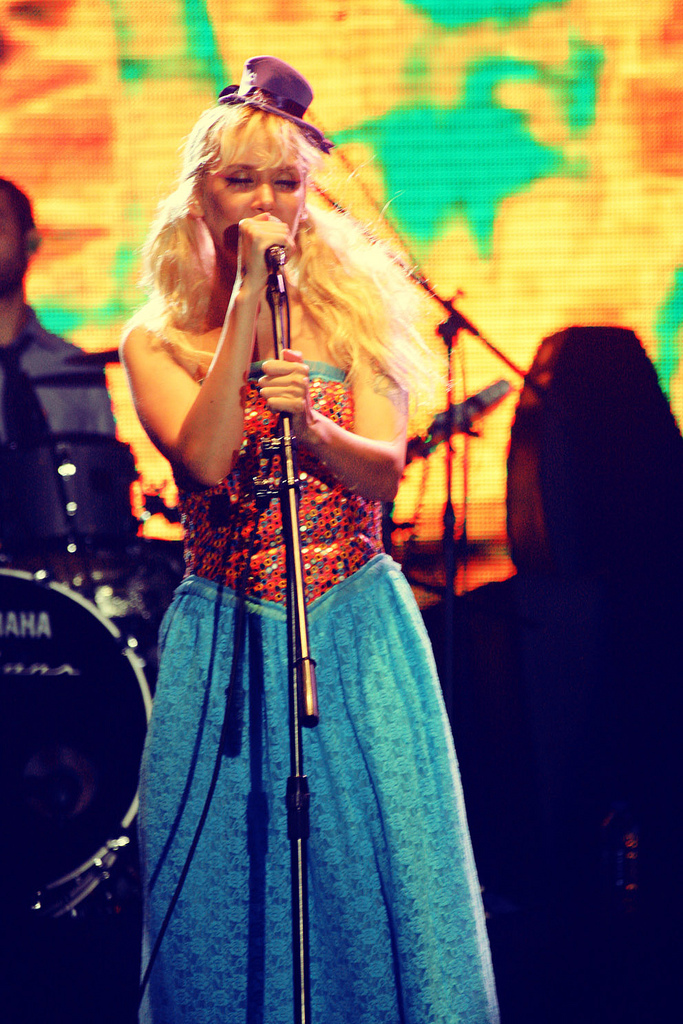
- Gökçe in 2012

Background information
- Born: Gökçe Dinçer; 9 September 1979 (age 46); Istanbul, Turkey
- Genres: Pop rock, Alternative rock
- Occupation: Singer
- Years active: 2007–present
- Website: http://www.gokcedincer.com

Gökçe Dinçer (born 9 September 1979) is a Turkish singer, songwriter and composer.

== Biography ==
Gökçe was born in Istanbul to Muhacir Bosniaks parents. She took piano and drums lessons at school. During her university years, she worked as a soloist for several amateur group. She studied art management and graduated from Yeditepe University's Department of Fine Arts. After two years of working for a commercial company, she decided to start a career as a musician. She began her work by performing as a drummer on the girl band The Eva Band. For about two years, they performed at numerous cities across Turkey.

In 2007, Gökçe released her first studio album Böğürtlenli Reçel, followed by Beş Kuruş Yok in 2009. Out of these albums, the songs "Aradım Seni", "Vay Be Ben Neymişim", "5 Kuruş" and "Anladım Ki" became hits in Turkey. In July 2011, she released a cover of the gypsy song "Tutti Frutti Te Kelas" under the new title "Tuttu Fırlattı" which became a number-one hit on Türkçe Top 20 and was the only rock song which had topped the list at the time. She also broke the record for the most viewed music video by a female Turkish singer on YouTube. In January 2012, her third studio album Kaktüs Çiçeği was released. The song "Ne Yapardım?" became one of the massive hits of her career.

Following her success, she was awarded the "Best Female Newcomer"'s award at the Golden Butterfly Awards. In Azerbaijan, she was chosen as the "Best Pop Singer of the Year" at the First 2012 awards. At the same year, she became the face of Pınar Kido and her song "Tuttu Fırlattı" was used on the company's advertisement.

== Breakthrough ==
In June 2011, Gökçe released the single "Tuttu Fırlattı" on digital platforms. It was produced by Alen Konakoğlu. A cover of a famous anonymous Balkan work "Tutti Frutti", it was composed by Gökçe and written in Turkish by Esin İris and Gökçe herself. On 12 March 2012, its music video passed 13 million views on YouTube, leaving Gülben Ergen and Mustafa Sandal's song "Şıkır Şıkır" behind. At the time, it was the first Turkish music video to have between 13 and 18 million views. The record, however, was broken once again on 22 October 2012 by Murat Dalkılıç's music video "Bir Güzellik Yap" which garnered 18 million views at the time. "Tuttu Fırlattı" was chosen as the "Best Song of the Year" at the İTÜ EMÖS Achievement Awards. On 1 February 2012, the song was included in her newly released album Kaktüs Çiçeği. For this album, she covered the Turkish classical song "Kıskanırım Seni Ben" and Miss Platnum's "Mercedes Benz", which she wrote again in Turkish under the title "Kime Ne?".

After this successful breakthrough, she was awarded the "Best Newcomer Soloist" award at the 2012 Golden Butterfly Awards. Some mentioned the fact that Gökçe had already been in the music industry for 4 years, on which she commented: "This award is more likely honoring 2011's most remarkable work. This is not an award given by a music channel. I had my main breakthrough last year with the release of "Tuttu Fırlattı". Hürriyet readers have seen me as the best newcomer of 2011, for which I'm grateful." At the same year, "Tuttu Fırlattı" was chosen as the "Most Favorite Song" at the Aslan Max 23 Nisan Awards. On 15 August 2012, the music video for "Oh Olsun" from her third album was released. It was directed by Onur Yayla. During this period Gökçe, became the face of the brand Pınar Kido. Her song "Tuttu Fırlattı" was used on the brand's commercial. Gökçe's album Kaktüs Çiçeği was successful outside Turkey as well. She was awarded the "Pop Singer of the Year" award at The First 2012 Awards in Baku, Azerbaijan. She later talked about receiving an award outside Turkey saying: "For the first time, I've received an award outside my country. That also came from the brother country Azerbaijan. I'm very happy". At the 2012 Elle Style Awards, she was nominated as the most stylish female singer.

== Personal life ==
In April 2014, she married dentist Bülent Gençer.

== Discography ==
=== Albums ===
- 2007: Böğürtlenli Reçel
- 2009: Beş Kuruş Yok
- 2012: Kaktüs Çiçeği
- 2014: Matruşka
- 2017: Kırmızı Kurdele

=== EPs ===
- 2022: Felek

=== Singles ===
- 2011: "Tuttu Fırlattı" (number-one on Türkçe Top 20)
- 2015: "Tik Tak (Iko Iko)"
- 2016: "Vazgeçmeseydin Keşke"
- 2019: "Hep Beraber Deliriyoruz"
- 2019: "Bu Kalp"
- 2020: "Sittin Sene (Live)" (feat. Kamufle)
- 2020: "Aksiyondayım"
- 2021: "Eyvallah"
- 2021: "Kader Utansın"
- 2021: "Beşiktaş Marşı"
- 2021: "Gel Çiçek Açalım"
- 2021: "Hoşgeldin Canım"
- 2022: "Hayat Sana Güzel"

=== As featured artist ===
- 2008: "Sen Sen Sen" (from the album 3 Hürel Şarkıları: Sonsuza Kadar)
- 2015: "Sittin Sene" (with Kamufle, from the album Hayale Daldım)
- 2016: "Kime Ne" (with Ozan Doğulu)
- 2017: "Kendine Gel" (with Yonca Evcimik and İrem Derici)
- 2017: "Ne Yapardım" (with What Da Funk, from the album WDF1)
- 2019: "Seviyorum Özlüyorum" (with Ümit Besen, from the album Ümit Besen ile Başka Sahne)
