= Ma vie dans la tienne =

Studio album by Lara Fabian
- Released: November 6, 2015
- Recorded: 2014–2015
- Genre: Pop
- Label: Warner Music France

Lara Fabian chronology
Le Secret (2013)	Ma vie dans la tienne (2015)	Camouflage (2017)

Ma vie dans la tienne is the twelfth studio album by singer Lara Fabian. The album was released November 6, 2015.

== Track listing ==
No.	Title	Length
1.	"Quand je ne chante pas"	4:30
2.	"Ma vie dans la tienne"	4:45
3.	"Le Désamour"	4:01
4.	"S'il ne reste qu'un ami"	3:20
5.	"Envie d'en rire"	3:28
6.	"Le Cœur qui tremble"	3:53
7.	"Ton désir"	4:39
8.	"L'Illusioniste"	3.52
9.	"Elle danse"	3:36
10.	"Relève-toi"	3:59
11.	"L'Oubli"	4:45

== Charts ==
Chart (2017)	Peak position
Belgian Albums (Ultratop Flanders)	44
Belgian Albums (Ultratop Wallonia)	3
French Albums (SNEP)	4
Swiss Albums (Schweizer Hitparade)	14
