= Kim Kuzma =

Canadian musician

- Occupation: Musician
- Years active: 1999–present

Kim Kuzma is a Canadian musician. She released her debut album Contradictions in 1999.

== Awards ==
In 2001, Kuzma won the West Coast Music Award for "Best Independent Release" for her debut CD Contradictions. She received five nominations that same year, including "Live Performer" and "Female Artist".

== Discography ==
- Contradictions (1999)
- It's Christmas (Without You), CD single (2001)
- Who You Are (2005)
- A Walk on the Clouds, CD single from the full-length CD entitled Les Allumeurs de Reves by Samuel Sixto featuring Kim Kuzma (2006)
- Meant to Fly, Official Anthem of the 2007 Vancouver BG Triathlon World Cup (2007)
- Guardian Angels, CD maxi-single (2008)
- I Am Alive, EP (2010)
- Acustico (2013)
