= Mademoiselle Zhivago =

Studio album by Lara Fabian
- Released: September 15, 2010 (Ukraine/Russia); June 21, 2012 (Belgium/France)
- Genre: Pop
- Length: 59:20
- Label: АРС Records, Ipanema

Lara Fabian chronology
Every Woman in Me (2009)	Mademoiselle Zhivago (2010)	Best of Lara Fabian (2010)

Mademoiselle Zhivago is an album by pop singer Lara Fabian. The whole set of songs composed by Fabian with Igor Krutoy is in English, French, Italian, Spanish and also in Russian.

== Track listing ==
All tracks are written by Lara Fabian and Igor Krutoy.

Original version
No.	Title	Length
1.	"Demain n'existe pas"	4:36
2.	"Toccami"	5:01
3.	"Llora"	5:48
4.	"Russian Fairy Tale"	4:08
5.	"Mademoiselle Hyde"	3:59
6.	"Desperate Housewife"	3:42
7.	"Lou"	3:55
8.	"Everland"	3:35
9.	"Vocalise"	5:50
10.	"Tomorrow is a lie"	4:36
11.	"Любовь, Похожая На Сон"	5:04
Total length:		46:39

Russian and Ukrainian track list
No.	Title	Length
1.	"Demain n'existe pas"	4:36
2.	"Toccami"	5:01
3.	"Llora"	5:48
4.	"Russian Fairy Tale"	4:08
5.	"Mademoiselle Hyde"	3:59
6.	"Desperate Housewife"	3:42
7.	"Lou"	3:55
8.	"Ever-Ever land"	3:35
9.	"Mr. President"	3:48
10.	"Мама Моя"	4:22
11.	"Vocalise"	5:50
12.	"Tomorrow is a lie"	4:36
13.	"Любовь, Похожая На Сон"	5:04

French and Belgian bonus tracks
No.	Title	Length
12.	"Always"	5:30
13.	"Je t'aime encore"	5:03

== Charts ==
=== Weekly charts ===
Weekly chart performance for Mademoiselle Zhivago
Chart (2012)	Peak position
Belgian Albums (Ultratop Wallonia)	2
Russian Albums (2M)	4

=== Year-end charts ===
Year-end chart performance for Mademoiselle Zhivago
Chart (2012)	Position
Belgian Albums (Ultratop Wallonia)	59
Russian Albums (2M)	29

== Movie ==
In 2013 the musical feature film "Mademoiselle Zhivago" was published. The 52 minute film, starring Lara Fabian herself in the main role and Max Barskih in the biggest supporting role, features all songs of the Mademoiselle Zhivago album. It was directed by the prize-winning Ukrainian director Alan Badoev.
