= Toutes les femmes en moi =

Studio album by Lara Fabian
- Released: May 25, 2009 (France)
- Recorded: 2008
- Genre: Pop, French pop

Lara Fabian chronology
Un regard 9 Live (2006)	Toutes les femmes en moi (2009)	Every woman in me (2009)

Singles from Toutes Les Femmes En Moi
- 1. "Soleil, Soleil" Released: March 11, 2009; 2. "Toutes les femmes en moi" Released: 2009

Toutes les femmes en moi is the 6th French album and 8th studio album in total released by Lara Fabian.

During 2008, Fabian was in Belgium preparing to record a brand new French album with famous pianist Mark Herskowitz, who had also composed and arranged the hidden instrumental track featured on the 2001 album "Nue". This album was rumoured to be "an album of traditional savour" inspired by classical pieces by Chopin and Gershwin however following comments by the artist this is now in doubt. The album was partly recorded in Montreal, Canada.

Fabian confirmed the release of this much-anticipated album on her official website on 20 October 2008. Fabian stated on her website that Toutes les femmes en moi is "daring" and "Blues, Jazz, Gospel, Klezmer, Tango, Neo Classic, White Soul come close without disturbing each other...". Fabian said in an English language blog on her official website: "Songs like « Göttingen » (Barbara), « L'amour existe encore » (Céline Dion) or « Il venait d'avoir 18 ans » (Dalida) embrace each other in [this album]...". However, she also stated that will "not be a cover album" leading initially to some ambiguity as to the content of the album.

The album was released on May 25, 2009, postponed from December 2008. The first single release from this album is "Soleil, Soleil" (a cover of the Nana Mouskouri song). This song was sent to French radio stations on March 11, 2009. The album was released in Canada on September 7, 2010. It contains a different version of the song "Nuit Magique", which was recorded in 2008 and was part of the first version of the album. The song is a duet with Canadian singer Coral Egan.

== Track listing ==
1. "Soleil soleil" (Nana Mouskouri)
2. "J'ai 12 ans" (Diane Dufresne)
3. "Amoureuse" (Véronique Sanson)
4. "Göttingen" (Barbara)
5. "Il venait d'avoir 18 ans" (Dalida)
6. "Mamy Blue" (Nicoletta)
7. "Une femme avec toi" (Nicole Croisille)
8. "Ça casse" (Maurane)
9. "L'amour existe encore" (Céline Dion)
10. "Message personnel" (Françoise Hardy)
11. "Toutes les femmes en moi" (Inédit)
12. "Nuit magique" (Catherine Lara)
13. "L'Hymne à l'amour" (Edith Piaf)
14. "Babacar" (France Gall) - Bonus online version

== Charts ==
Chart (2009/2010)	Peak position
Belgian (Wallonia) Albums Chart	1
French Albums Chart	3
Russian Albums Chart	5
Swiss Albums Chart	41
Belgian (Flanders) Albums Chart	60
Canadian Albums Chart	25
