= 9 (Lara Fabian album) =

Studio album by Lara Fabian
- Released: 29 March 2005 (France)
- Recorded: 2004–2005
- Genre: Pop, acoustic, French pop
- Length: 42:22
- Label: Polydor
- Producer: Jean-Félix Lalanne

Lara Fabian chronology
A Wonderful Life (2004)	9 (2005)	Un regard 9 Live (2006)

9 is the 5th French album and 7th studio album in total to be released by the singer Lara Fabian.

The album is considered by many as a shift in Lara's music style, and vocal performance, primarily because it was Lara's first album that long time producer, Rick Allison, did not produce. The Album was produced by Jean-Félix Lalanne. He also, with Fabian, composed many of the songs in the album.

Special digipack editions of the album included a DVD of music videos for most of the songs on the album.

The album was followed by the "Un Regard 9" tour, which totaled over 60 concerts.

== Track listing ==
No.	Title	Writer(s)	Length
1.	"La Lettre"	Lara Fabian, Jean-Félix Lalanne	3:53
2.	"Un Ave Maria"	Lara Fabian, Jean-Félix Lalanne	4:58
3.	"Si tu n'as pas d'amour"	Jean-Félix Lalanne	3:49
4.	"Il ne manquait que toi"	Lara Fabian, Jean-Félix Lalanne	4:32
5.	"Ne lui parlez plus d'elle"	Lara Fabian, Jean-Félix Lalanne	4:04
6.	"Rien qu'une seule larme"	Lara Fabian, Jean-Félix Lalanne	3:38
7.	"Les Homéricains" (duet with Melissa Mars)	Lara Fabian, Jean-Félix Lalanne	3:24
8.	"Speranza"	Lara Fabian, Jean-Félix Lalanne	3:04
9.	"Le tour du monde"	Lara Fabian, Jean-Félix Lalanne	3:19
10.	"L'homme qui n'avait pas de maison"	Lara Fabian, Jean-Félix Lalanne	4:22
11.	"Je me souviens"	Lara Fabian, Jérémy Jouniaux	3:20

=== Special edition DVD track listing ===
1. "Je me souviens"
2. "Il ne manquait que toi"
3. "Si tu n'as pas d'amour"
4. "Un Ave Maria"
5. "Les Homéricains" – duet with Melissa Mars
6. "Ne lui parlez plus d'elle"
7. "Speranza"
8. "L'homme qui n'avait pas de maison"
9. "La Lettre"

== Charts ==
Chart (2005)	Peak position
Belgian Albums (Ultratop Flanders)	67
Belgian Albums (Ultratop Wallonia)	2
Canadian Albums (Nielsen SoundScan)	20
French Albums (SNEP)	3
Swiss Albums (Schweizer Hitparade)	32

== Certifications and sales ==
Region	Certification	Certified units/sales
Belgium (BRMA)	Gold	25,000^{*}
France (SNEP)	2× Gold	200,000^{*}
^{*} Sales figures based on certification alone.
