= Live 2002 (Lara Fabian album) =

Live album by Lara Fabian
- Released: (France) (Canada) November 12, 2002
- Recorded: December 14, 17, 18 & 19, 2001
- Genre: Live album, French pop, pop
- Length: 74:03
- Label: Polydor

Lara Fabian chronology
Nue (2001)	Live 2002 (2002)	En toute intimité (2003)

DVD cover
- DVD cover

Live is the title of both a CD and DVD released by Belgian pop singer Lara Fabian in 2002. This is Fabian's first live DVD, second live album and seventh album in total. Both the CD and DVD were recorded during a concert on December 14, 2001 at Forest National in Brussels and concerts on December 17, 18 & 19 2001 at Le Zénith in Paris.

The concert features many of Fabian's hits and songs from her recent studio album, Nue. During the concert, there is a special emphasis on "Je t'aime" which is unexpectedly sung in a large part by the audience, leaving a tearful Fabian caught by surprise. The duet of "Tu es mon autre" was performed especially for the recording by the two composers of the song, Fabian and her longtime collaborator, Rick Allison. Both say to one another before the performance "[...] a song that I wrote for you, and that you wrote for me [...]". Live also included two versions of the single "Immortelle"; one a three-minute version performed by Fabian at the piano as an intro to the concert, and a second version similar to the original studio recording as the concert finale. During the second "Immortelle", Fabian and the band can be seen leaving the stage towards a butterfly on the back screen. This is a symbol that Fabian insisted on having on stage during this tour as it was the main image used in the cover art of Nue and because it portrayed the strong significance of the ideas of womanhood presented on Nue.

The Live CD contains two studio recordings; a new song composed by Fabian, "Tu me manques", and a studio version of Charles Aznavour's classic "Comme ils disent". The DVD contains some live tracks which, due to time constraints, were left off the CD.

== CD track listing ==
#	Title	Written by	Time
1.	"Tu me manques" - studio recording	Lara Fabian	03:14
2.	"Immortelle" - piano/voice version	Lara Fabian, Rick Allison	04:14
3.	"Tout"	Lara Fabian, Rick Allison	04:25
4.	"Alléluia"	Lara Fabian, Rick Allison, Daniel Seff	04:13
5.	"Aimer déjà"	Lara Fabian, Rick Allison	04:06
6.	"Africa" / "Rio"	David Paich, Jeff Porcaro / Lara Fabian, Vincenzo Thoma, Rick Allison	06:18
7.	"Pas sans toi"	Lara Fabian, Rick Allison	04:34
8.	"Si tu m'aimes"	Lara Fabian, Rick Allison	04:53
9.	"Tu es mon autre" - duet with Rick Allison	Lara Fabian, Rick Allison	03:50
10.	"S'en aller"	Lara Fabian, Rick Allison	05:10
11.	"Parce que tu pars"	Lara Fabian, Rick Allison	04:26
12.	"Je t'aime"	Lara Fabian, Rick Allison	05:01
13.	"Silence"	Lara Fabian, Rick Allison	04:34
14.	"J'y crois encore"	Lara Fabian, Rick Allison	03:53
15.	"Immortelle"	Lara Fabian, Rick Allison	05:26
16.	"Comme ils disent" - studio recording	Charles Aznavour	05:35

== DVD track listing ==
1. "Immortelle" - piano/voice version
2. "Tout"
3. "Alléluia"
4. "Aimer déjà"
5. "La différence"
6. "Africa" / "Rio"
7. "Tango"
8. "Pas sans toi"
9. "Si tu m'aimes"
10. "Tu es mon autre" - duet with Rick Allison
11. "S'en aller"
12. "Parce que tu pars"
13. "Humana"
14. "Je t'aime"
15. "Silence"
16. "J'y crois encore"
17. "Immortelle"
18. "Je suis mon coeur"

== Charts ==
Chart (2002)	Peak position
Belgian Albums (Ultratop Wallonia)	9
French Albums (SNEP)	10
Swiss Albums (Schweizer Hitparade)	61
