= Carpe diem (Lara Fabian album) =

Carpe Diem

Studio album by Lara Fabian
- Released: (Canada) 1994 (France) (Belgium) (Switzerland) 1998
- Genre: Pop
- Label: PolyGram, Les Productions Clandestines
- Producer: Rick Allison

Lara Fabian chronology
Lara Fabian (1991)	Carpe Diem (1994)	Pure (1996)

Carpe diem is Belgian-Canadian singer Lara Fabian's second French album released in 1994. The album sold more than 250,000 copies.

== Track listing ==
No.	Title	Lyrics	Music	Length
1.	"Puisque c'est l'amour"	Eddy Marnay; Cournoyer Carole; Kuzma Kim	Dave Pickell	4:25
2.	"Tu t'en vas"	Lara Fabian; Parent Mario	Rick Allison	3:43
3.	"Leïla"	Fabian	Stan Meissner	4:48
4.	"Il existe un endroit"	Fabian	Pickell	3:31
5.	"Je suis malade"	Serge Lama	Alice Dona	4:23
6.	"Je vivrai"	Bruce Gaitsch; Richard Marx	Gaitsch; Marnay	4:58
7.	"Au loin là-bas"	Gaitsch; Marx	Allison; Amy Sky	4:25
8.	"Ramène-moi"	Fabian	Meissner	4:36
9.	"Pas sans toi"	Fabian	Allison	3:58
10.	"Dites-moi pourquoi je l'aime"	Fabian; Lovena Fox	Pickell	4:56
11.	"Saisir le jour"	Langis Marc	Marc	4:20
12.	"Si tu m'aimes"	Fabian	Allison	3:29
13.	"Bridge of Hope"	Michael Jay	Jay	4:30

== Charts ==
Chart (1998)	Peak position
Belgian Albums (Ultratop Wallonia)	16
European Albums (Music & Media)	40
French Albums (SNEP)	4

== Certifications ==
Region	Certification	Certified units/sales
Canada (Music Canada)	2× Platinum	200,000^{^}
^{^} Shipments figures based on certification alone.
