= Mustafa Ceceli =

Turkish singer (born 1980)

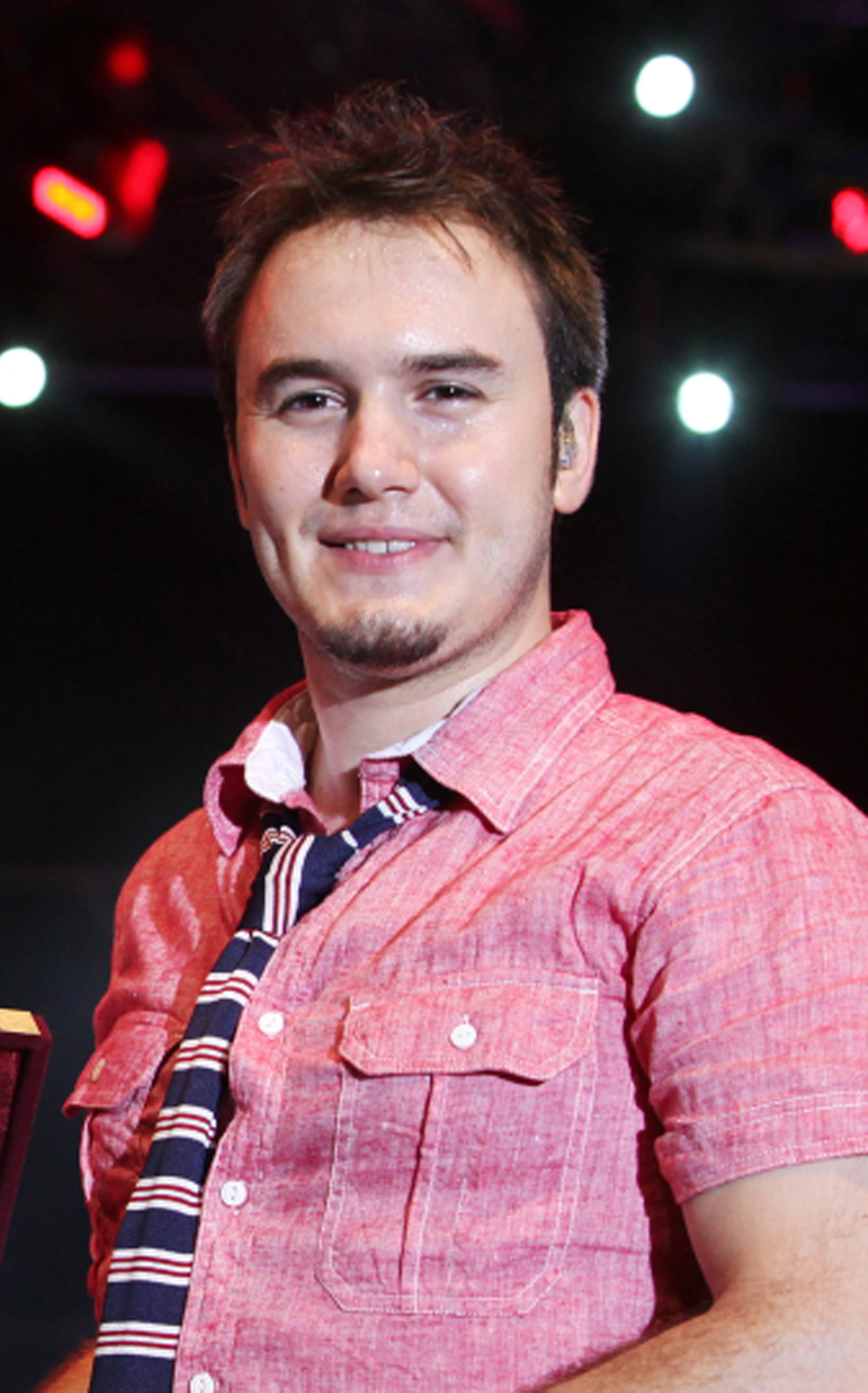
- Ceceli in 2012
- Born: 2 November 1980 (age 45); Ankara, Turkey
- Occupations: Singer-songwriter; arranger; Record producer
- Spouse(s): Sinem Gedik (m. 2008; div. 2017) Selin İmer (m. 2017)
- Children: 1
- Musical career
- Genre: Pop
- Instruments: Piano; guitar; goblet drum; drums; keyboards; percussion
- Years active: 2003–present
- Label: DMC

Mustafa Ceceli (Turkish pronunciation: [mustaˌfa dʒedʒeˈli]; born 2 November 1980) is a Turkish singer.

== Career ==
His musical career started with an amateur high school band. After high school, he attended to Ankara University Faculty of Veterinary. In third class, he left this faculty, he took the university entrance exams second time and he attended Yeditepe University Management department.

His professional music career has started after meeting Ozan Doğulu and with his various arrangements for Sezen Aksu. His first album was released in 2009 with the title also bearing his own name. Mustafa Ceceli has co-produced, arranged or performed over twenty top ten hits in Turkish charts.

He has twice won the Turkey Music Awards. They were in the categories of "Best Album" and "Best Male Artist". He received the awards in 2010 and 2014.

In 2018, Ceceli composed the melody for "The Turkey Anthem", a song for the Turkish invasion of Afrin on request of the Turkish president Recep Tayyip Erdoğan.

== Discography ==
=== Albums ===
Studio albums

- 2009: Mustafa Ceceli
- 2012: Es
- 2014: Kalpten
- 2015: Aşk İçin Gelmişiz
- 2017: Zincirimi Kırdı Aşk
- 2023: İyi ki Sen Varsın

Compilation albums

- 2013: Mustafa Ceceli 5. Yıl
- 2016: Mustafa Ceceli Koleksiyon

Remixes

- 2010: Mustafa Ceceli Remixes
- 2011: Eksik Remix 2011
- 2012: Es+ Remixes

EPs

- 2017: Simsiyah

=== Singles ===
As lead artist

- "Limon Çiçekleri" (2022)
- "Hastalıkta Sağlıkta" (2010)
- "Eksik" (with Elvan Günaydın) (2011)
- "Es" (2012)
- "Söyle Canım" (2013)
- "Emri Olur" (2016)
- "Aşkım Benim (2015)
- "Zincirimi Kırdı Aşk (2017)
- "İyi ki Hayatımdasın" (2017)
- "Maşallah" (2017)
- "Kıymetlim" (with İrem Derici) (2017)
- "Anlarsın" (with Sinan Akçıl) (2018)
- "Yaz Bunu Bir Kenara" (2019)
- "Bedel" (2019)
- "Saçma Sapan" (2020)
- "Ki Sen" (2020)
- "Gün Ağarmadan" (with Irmak Arıcı) (2020)
- "Rüyalara Sor" (2020)
- "Rüyalara Sor" (feat. Ece Mumay) [Acoustic] (2020)
- "Öptüm Nefesinden" (feat. Ekin Uzunlar) (2020)
- "Ölümlüyüm" (2021)
- "Başaramadım" (2021)
- "Rüzgar" (with Bilal Hancı) (2021)
- "Leyla Mecnun" (with Burak Bulut & Kurtuluş Kuş) (2021)
- "İmtiyaz" (with JİNE) (2021)
- "Tut Elimden" (2021)
- "Canım" (with Yaşar İpek) (2021)
- "Salıncak" (feat. Nigar Muharrem, Burak Bulut & Kurtuluş Kuş) (2022)
- "Varsa Eşq" (with Şöhret Memmedov) (2022)
- "Gerçekten Zor" (2022)
- "Yıkamazsın" (2022)
- "Rastgele" (with İrem Derici, Burak Bulut & Kurtuluş Kuş) (2022)
- "Dayan" (with Semicenk) (2022)
- "İlla" (with Indira Elemes) (2022)
- "Gelme Üstüme" (2022)
- "Sargı" (with Nigar Muharrem, Burak Bulut & Kurtuluş Kuş) (2022)
- "Zaman" (with Bengü) (2022)
- "Yolları Aşamadım" (with Ekin Uzunlar) (2023)
- "Unutamıyorum" (2024)
- "Yaka Yaka" (with Rabia Tunçbilek) (2024)
- "Ömrüm" (2024)
- "Yüreğim" (with Vüsal Əliyev) (2024)
- "Kervan" (with Bengü) (2025)
- "Tutuşmuş Karadeniz" (2025)
- "Yarem" (2025)
- "Ötesi Yok" (with Sessizler) (2025)
- "Duramıyorum" (with Merve Özbey) (2025)

As featured artist

- "Unutamam" (with Enbe Orkestrası) (2007, from the album Enbe Orkestrası)
- "Karanfil" (2008, from the album Uzay Heparı Sonsuza)
- "Hata" (with Ozan Doğulu) (2010, from the album 130 Bpm)
- "Eksik" (with Enbe Orkestrası and Elvan Günaydın) (2010, from the album Kalbim)
- "Yarabbim" (2012, from the album Orhan Gencebay ile Bir Ömür)
- "Haram Geceler" (with Ozan Doğulu) (2014, from the album 130 Bpm Moderato)
- "Sarı Saçlarından Sen Suçlusun" (2014, from the album Kayahan'ın En İyileri No.1)
- "Aşığız" and "Mavi Mavi" (with Sinan Ceceli) (2017, from the album Söyle)
- "Merdo" (with Yiğit Mahzuni) (2017, from the album Mahzuni'ye Saygı)
- "Sana Değer" (2018, from the album Yıldız Tilbe'nin Yıldızlı Şarkıları)
- "Düşünme Hiç" (2019, from the album Fikret Şeneş Şarkıları)
- "Çok Sevmek Yasaklanmalı" (with İrem Derici and Sinan Akçıl) (2020, from the album Piyanist)
- "Eve Giremiyorum" (with Sinan Akçıl) (2020, from the album Piyanist)
- "İçime Atıyorum" (with Ziynet Sali) (2021, from the album Yaşam Çiçeği)
- "Durum Çok Acil" (with Sinan Akçıl and Merve Özbey) (2022, from the album Piyanist 2)
- "Beni Unut" (2022, from the album Serdar Ortaç Şarkıları, Vol. 1)
- "Efkâr Gecesi" (with İrem Derici and Sinan Akçıl) (2023, from the album Piyanist 3 (Next Generation))
- "İnsafsız" (with Irmak Arıcı) (2023, from the album Hürmet)

Other duets

- "Şeker" (with Ravi İncigöz) (2014)
- "Kış Masalı" (with Sibel Can) (2014)
- "Untuk Cinta" (with Siti) (2016)
- "Aşk Haklıyı Seçmiyor" (with Sera Tokdemir) (2018)
- Turkey Anthem (on request by the Turkish president Recep Tayyip Erdogan)
- "Mühür" (with Irmak Arıcı) (2019)
- "Ben de Özledim" (with Bahadır Tatlıöz, Aydın Kurtoğlu, and Gülden) (2020)
- "Dünya" (with Tohi and Sinan Akçıl) (2020)
- "Şeref" (with Serdem Coşkun) (2023)
- "İstanbul Ankara" (with Azat Taş) (2024)

International

Year	Single	Peak positions		Album
Year	Single	BEL (Wa)	FR	Album
2014	"Make Me Yours Tonight"	33 (Ultratip)	151	

*Did not appear in the official Belgian Ultratop 50 charts, but rather in the bubbling under Ultratip charts.

=== Charts ===
List of singles, release date and album name
Single	Year	Peak	Album
Single	Year	TR	Album
"Unutamam" (feat. Enbe Orkestrası)	2007	2	Enbe Orkestrası
"Karanfil"	2008	7	Uzay Heparı Sonsuza
"Limon Çiçekleri"	2009	1	Mustafa Ceceli
"Hastalıkta Sağlıkta"	2009	1	Mustafa Ceceli
"Dön"	2010	2	Mustafa Ceceli
"Tenlerin Seçimi"	2010	—	Mustafa Ceceli
"Bekle"	2010	9	Mustafa Ceceli
"Eksik" (feat. Enbe Orkestrası & Elvan Günaydın)	2010	1	Kalbim
"Yağmur Ağlıyor"	2011	14	Kalbim
"Şarkı"	2011	—	Mustafa Ceceli
"Es"	2012	1	Es
"Bir Yanlış Kaç Doğru"	2012	3	Es
"Deli Gönlüm"	2012	—	Es+ Remixes
"Sevgilim"	2012	—	Es
"Aman"	2013	—	Es
"Dünyanın Bütün Sabahları"	2013	—	Es+ Remixes
"Aşk Döşeği"	2014	—	Es
"Al Götür Beni" (feat. Lara Fabian)	2014	—	Al Götür Beni
"Aşikâr'dır Zat-ı Hak"	2014	—	Es
"Hüsran"	2014	—	Kalpten
"Gül Rengi"	2015	—	Kalpten
"İlle De Aşk"	2015	5	Kalpten
"Islak İmza"	2015	—	Kalpten
"Sultanım"	2015	5	Aşk İçin Gelmişiz
"Emri Olur"	2016	—	Emri Olur
"Bedel"	2019	1	Bedel
"—" indicates that the songs were not included in the lists or the results were not disclosed.

== Television ==
- O Ses Çocuklar – Judge – 2014
- Kapışma – Judge – 2015
