= Le Secret (album) =

Studio album by Lara Fabian
- Released: 15 April 2013 (France)
- Recorded: 2012–2013
- Genre: Pop, French pop
- Length: 78:03
- Label: 9 Productions

Lara Fabian chronology
Best of Lara Fabian (2010)	Le Secret (2013)	Ma vie dans la tienne (2015)

Le Secret is a 2013 album by Belgian-Italian-Canadian international singer Lara Fabian. It was released on 15 April 2013. The album is produced by her label 9Productions. Distribution was by Warner Music France. after Fabian left her earlier distribution label Universal France. The album was a big success selling a certified 18,768 copies in its first week of release and appearing at number 1 in SNEP, the official French Albums Chart.

She released the single "Deux ils, deux elles" as a pre-release, after performing it live during a concert in favor of same sex marriage. The music video for the song was released on 4 April 2013.

== Track listing ==
No.	Title	Writer(s)	Length
1.	"Le Secret"	Lara Fabian (lyrics), Giora Linenberg (music)	5:19
2.	"Danse"	Fabian (l), Janey Clewer (m)	5:00
3.	"Amourexique"	Fabian (l), Clewer (m)	4:59
4.	"Un ange est tombé"	Fabian (l), Clewer, Kurt Howell, Jenifer Mc Laren (m)	4:15
5.	"Je t'appelle"	Fabian (l), Clewer (m)	4:38
6.	"Mirage"	Fabian (l), Clewer (m)	3:37
7.	"Que j'étais belle"	Fabian (l), Clewer (m)	4:55
8.	"La vie est là"	Fabian (l), Clewer, Gregg Mangiafico (m),	4:30
9.	"Je rêve d'une étoile"	Fabian (l), Clewer (m)	3:53
10.	"Kalpataru"	Fabian (l), Clewer, Mangiafico (m)	6:32
11.	"Deux ils, deux elles"	Fabian, Patrice Guillou (l), Flavien Compagnon (m)	3:30
12.	"Ce qu'il reste..."	Fabian (l), Linenberg (m)	4:01
13.	"P... de grand amour"	Fabian (l), Clewer (m)	4:35
14.	"Il est Lune"	Fabian (l), Clewer (m)	4:01
15.	"Mon désir"	Fabian (l), Clewer (m)	4:14
16.	"L'Enfant du Gwenved"	Fabian (l), Clewer, Don Hart (m)	4:14
17.	"I Am A-WA"	Fabian (l), Clewer (m)	5:25

== Distribution ==
- France: Warner Music Group
- Switzerland : Universal Music Suisse
- Belgium / Luxembourg / Netherlands : Universal Music Benelux

== Charts ==
=== Weekly charts ===
Chart (2013)	Peak position
Belgian Albums (Ultratop Flanders)	37
Belgian Albums (Ultratop Wallonia)	1
French Albums (SNEP)	1
Swiss Albums (Schweizer Hitparade)	16

=== Year-end charts ===
Chart (2013)	Position
Belgian Albums (Ultratop Wallonia)	23
French Albums (SNEP)	92

== Certifications ==
Region	Certification	Certified units/sales
Belgium (BEA)	Gold	15,000^{*}
France (SNEP)	Gold	50,000^{*}
^{*} Sales figures based on certification alone.
