= A Wonderful Life (Lara Fabian album) =

Studio album by Lara Fabian
- Released: June 1, 2004
- Length: 49:20
- Label: Sony Music
- Producer: Anders Bagge; Gary Barlow; Desmond Child; Eliot Kennedy; Jean-Félix Lalanne; Tim Woodcock

Lara Fabian chronology
| En toute intimité (2003) | A Wonderful Life (2004) | 9 (2005) |

A Wonderful Life is the second English-language album by pop singer Lara Fabian. It was released by Sony BMG on June 1, 2004. In France, the album sold an estimated 82,000 copies. "A Wonderful Life" was Fabian's last album under her contract with Sony Records and she subsequently left the company.

The album consists mostly of acoustic-influenced pop tracks. Fabian had been offered and turned down, the track "Review My Kisses" before it was recorded by US country music star LeAnn Rimes for her 2002 album "Twisted Angel". However Fabian was so impressed with Rimes' performance that she decided to record it herself.

== Track listing ==
A Wonderful Life track listing
| No. | Title | Writer(s) | Producer(s) | Length |
|---|---|---|---|---|
| 1. | "No Big Deal" | Eliot Kennedy; Gary Barlow; Lara Fabian; Rick Allison; Tim Woodcock | Kennedy; Barlow; Woodcock | 3:57 |
| 2. | "I Am" | Desmond Child; Chris Braide; Fabian | Child; Kennedy; Barlow; Woodcock | 3:59 |
| 3. | "The Last Goodbye" | Stephen Robson; Wayne Hector | Child; Kennedy; Barlow; Woodcock | 4:22 |
| 4. | "I Guess I Loved You" | Anders Bagge; Fabian; Peer Åström; Rick Allison | Bagge | 3:34 |
| 5. | "Conquered" | Kennedy; Barlow; Allison | Kennedy; Barlow; Woodcock | 3:45 |
| 6. | "Review My Kisses" | Child; Marie Wilson | Jean-Felix Lalanne | 5:02 |
| 7. | "Unbreakable" | Fabian; Woodcock; Hector | Lalanne | 3:11 |
| 8. | "Wonderful Life" | Colin Vearncombe | Kennedy; Barlow; Woodcock | 3:45 |
| 9. | "Intoxicated" | Fabian; Barlow | Kennedy; Barlow; Woodcock | 5:21 |
| 10. | "I've Cried Enough" | Fabian; Allison | Kennedy; Barlow; Woodcock | 4:58 |
| 11. | "Silence" | Fabian; Allison | Lalanne | 3:00 |
| 12. | "Walk Away" | Kara DioGuardi; Walter Afanasieff | Lalanne | 4:19 |
| Total length: | | | | 49:20 |

== Charts ==
Weekly chart performance for A Wonderful Life
| Chart (2004) | Peak position |
|---|---|
| Belgian Albums (Ultratop Flanders) | 54 |
| Belgian Albums (Ultratop Wallonia) | 4 |
| Dutch Albums (Album Top 100) | 68 |
| Finnish Albums (Suomen virallinen lista) | 36 |
| French Albums (SNEP) | 8 |
| German Albums (Offizielle Top 100) | 80 |
| Portuguese Albums (AFP) | 16 |
| Russian Albums (NFPF) | 2 |
| Swiss Albums (Schweizer Hitparade) | 18 |

== Release history ==
A Wonderful Life release history
| Region | Date | Format | Label |
|---|---|---|---|
| France | June 1, 2004 | CD; Digital download | Sony BMG |
| Canada | June 29, 2004 | CD; Digital download | Sony BMG |
