= Nue (album) =

Studio album by Lara Fabian
- Released: August 28, 2001; October 30, 2001
- Recorded: 2000–2001
- Genre: Pop; French pop; adult contemporary
- Length: 73:36
- Label: Polydor; Universal
- Producer: Rick Allison

Lara Fabian chronology
Lara Fabian (2000) (1999-2000)	Nue (2001)	Live 2002 (2002)

Alternative cover
- Rare "Nue" album cover

Singles from Nue
- 1. "J'y crois encore" Released: July 2001; 2. "S’en aller" Released: December 2001; 3. "Immortelle" Released: January 2002; 4. "Aimer dejá" Released: June 2002; 5. "Tu es mon autre (Duet with Maurane)" Released: October 2002

Nue (French for naked), is Lara Fabian's fifth album, and first French release in four years, since Pure.

== Track listing ==
No.	Title	Writer(s)	Length
1.	"J'y crois encore"	Lara Fabian; Rick Allison	3:29
2.	"Aimer déjà"	Fabian; Allison	4:07
3.	"S'en aller"	Fabian; Allison	4:45
4.	"Silence"	Fabian; Allison	3:48
5.	"Parce que tu pars"	Fabian; Allison	4:28
6.	"Je suis mon cœur"	Christine Lidon; Daniel Lavoie	5:46
7.	"Tango"	Fabian; Allison	4:00
8.	"Imagine"	Fabian; Allison	4:02
9.	"Tu es mon autre (Duet with Maurane)"	Fabian; Allison	3:42
10.	"Rio"	Fabian; Allison; Vincenzo Thoma	3:34
11.	"Bambina"	Fabian; Janey Clewer	4:23
12.	"Immortelle"	Fabian; Allison	5:18
13.	"Le roi est une femme"	Didier Golemanas; Daniel Seff	5:15
14.	"Piano nocture"	Allison; Lavoie; Seff; Janey Clewer	16:51

== Credits ==
- Rick Allison : Guitar, Piano, Arranger, Programming, Clavier, Basse
- Kate Barry : Photography
- Janey Clewer : Piano
- Julie Leblanc : Choir, Chorus
- Cathi Leveille : Choir, Chorus
- Kim Richardson : Choir, Chorus
- William James Ross : Arranger
- Dorian Sherwood : Percussion, Choir, Chorus

== Charts ==
Chart (2001)	Peak position
Belgian Albums (Ultratop Wallonia)	1
European Albums (Music & Media)	25
French Albums (SNEP)	2
Portuguese Albums (AFP)	7
Swiss Albums (Schweizer Hitparade)	10

== Certifications ==
Region	Certification	Certified units/sales
Belgium (BRMA)	Gold	25,000^{*}
France (SNEP)	2× Platinum	600,000^{*}
Switzerland (IFPI Switzerland)	Gold	20,000^{^}
^{*} Sales figures based on certification alone.^{^} Shipments figures based on certification alone.
