= Live (Lara Fabian album) =

Live album by Lara Fabian
- Released: (Canada) March 2, 1999 (France) April 27, 1999
- Recorded: 1998
- Genres: Live album, French pop, pop
- Label: Polydor

Lara Fabian chronology
Pure (1996)	Live (1999)	Lara Fabian (1999–2000)

Live is Lara Fabian's first live album and fourth in total. The album was released in 1999.

== Track listing ==
=== 2 CDs edition ===
Disc 1
No.	Title	Lyrics	Music	Length
1.	"Ouverture Tout"	Lara Fabian	Rick Allison	01:58
2.	"Alléluia"	Lara Fabian	Daniel Seff, Rick Allison	04:14
3.	"Les amoureux de l'an deux mille"	Lara Fabian	Rick Allison	05:21
4.	"Leïla"	Lara Fabian	Meissner Stan	06:09
5.	"La différence"	Lara Fabian	Rick Allison	04:19
6.	"Perdere l'amore"	Giampiero Artegiani	Marcello Marrocchi	05:33
7.	"J'ai zappé"	Dominique Owen	Vincent Thoma	05:25
8.	"Si tu m'aimes"	Lara Fabian	Rick Allison	04:30
9.	"Evidemment" (with Rick Allison)	Michel Berger	Michel Berger	04:15
10.	"Tout"	Lara Fabian	Rick Allison	04:44

Disc 2
No.	Title	Lyrics	Music	Length
1.	"Humana"	Lara Fabian	Rick Allison	05:50
2.	"Urgent désir"	Daniel Lavoie, Mario Proulx	Daniel Lavoie	04:27
3.	"Ici"	Lara Fabian, Daniel Seff	Daniel Seff	03:29
4.	"Dites-moi pourquoi je l'aime"	Lara Fabian, Lovena Fox	Dave Pickell	05:18
5.	"Réveille-toi brother"	Lara Fabian	Rick Allison, Marc Langis	07:23
6.	"Je suis malade"	Serge Lama	Alice Dona	05:25
7.	"Je t'aime"	Lara Fabian	Rick Allison	06:15
8.	"Je t'appartiens"	Lara Fabian	Janey Clewer	03:47
9.	"Requiem pour un fou" (with Johnny Hallyday))	Gilles Thibaut	G Layani	04:04

=== 1 CD edition ===
#	Title	Music	Lyrics	Time
1	"Overture Tout"	Rick Allison	Lara Fabian	01:58
2	"Alléluia"	Daniel Seff, Rick Allison	Lara Fabian	04:14
3	"Leïla"	Meissner Stan	Lara Fabian	06:09
4	"Perdere l'amore"	Marcello Marrocchi	Giampiero Artegiani	05:33
5	"J'ai zappé"	Vincent Thoma	Dominique Owen	05:25
6	"Si tu m'aimes"	Rick Allison	Lara Fabian	04:30
7	"Evidemment" (with Rick Allison)	Michel Berger	Michel Berger	04:15
8	"Tout"	Rick Allison	Lara Fabian	04:44
9	"Humana"	Rick Allison	Lara Fabian	05:50
10	"Ici"	Daniel Seff	Lara Fabian, Daniel Seff	03:29
11	"Dites-moi pourquoi je l'aime"	Dave Pickell	Lara Fabian, Lovena Fox	05:18
12	"Je suis malade"	Alice Dona	Serge Lama	05:25
13	"Je t'aime"	Rick Allison	Lara Fabian	06:15
14	"Je t'appartiens"	Janey Clewer	Lara Fabian	03:47

== Charts ==
Chart (1999)	Peak position
Belgian Albums (Ultratop Wallonia)	1
European Albums (Music & Media)	18
French Albums (SNEP)	1

== Certifications ==
Region	Certification	Certified units/sales
Belgium (BRMA)	Gold	25,000^{*}
France (SNEP)	2× Gold	200,000^{*}
^{*} Sales figures based on certification alone.
