= Lara Fabian =

Belgian-Italian and Canadian singer and songwriter (born 1970)

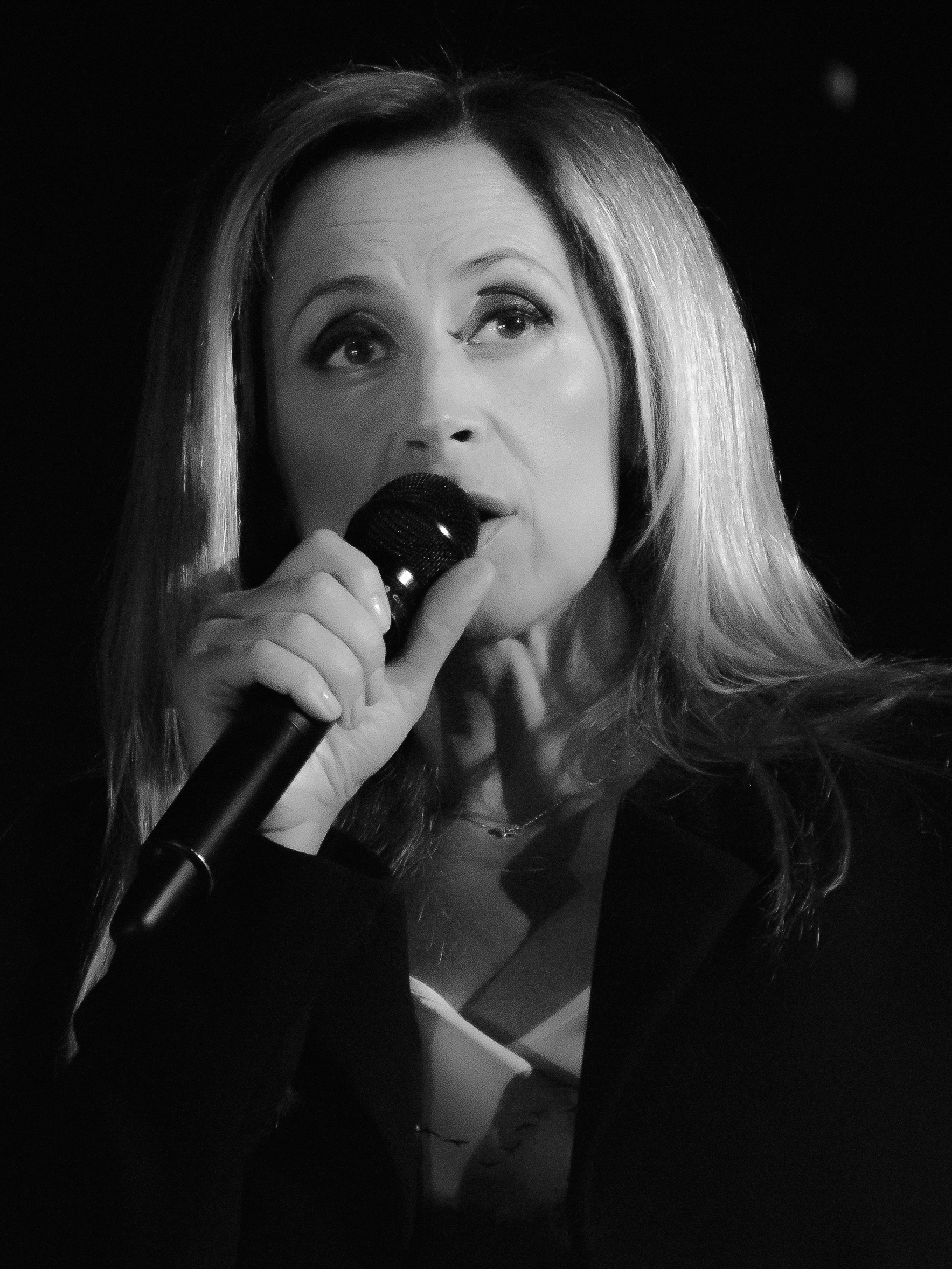
- Fabian performing in 2016
- Born: Lara Sophie Katy Crokaert; 9 January 1970 (age 56); Etterbeek, Brussels, Belgium
- Occupations: Singer; songwriter
- Spouse: Gabriel Di Giorgio (m. 2013)
- Partners: Rick Allison (c. 1990–2003); Gérard Pullicino (2006–2012)
- Children: 1
- Musical career
- Origin: Dublin, Ireland; Montreal, Quebec, Canada
- Genres: French pop; pop rock; acoustic; dance-pop
- Works: Lara Fabian discography
- Years active: 1986–present
- Labels: Polydor; Sony; Universal; Warner; 9 Productions
- Website: www.larafabian.com

Signature
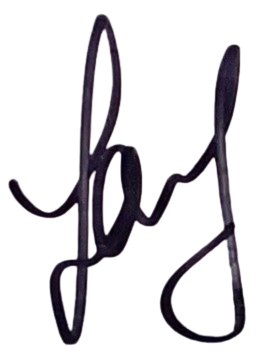

Lara Sophie Katy Crokaert (Note: French: [laʁa kʁɔkaʁt], Flemish: [ˈlaːraː ˈkroːkaːrt].) (born 9 January 1970), known professionally as Lara Fabian, (Note: French: [laʁa fabjɑ̃], Flemish: [ˈlaːraː ˈfaːbijɑn], Italian: [ˈlaːra ˈfaːbjan].) is a Belgian and Canadian singer and songwriter. Having sold over 12 million records worldwide, she is one of the best-selling Belgian artists of all time.

Born in Brussels to a Belgian father and an Italian mother, she moved to Quebec in 1990 and, since 1995, has held Canadian citizenship alongside her Belgian one.

== Early life and education ==
Lara Sophie Katy Crokaert was born on 9 January 1970 in Etterbeek, in the Brussels-Capital Region of Belgium, the only child of Pierre Crokaert, a Flemish musician who collaborated with Petula Clark, and Maria Luisa Serio, a Sicilian from Acireale. She was raised between the Italian city of Catania, Sicily and the Belgian town of Ruisbroek, Flemish Brabant, speaking Italian as her first language. Fabian's parents recognized her talent early on and enrolled her in the Royal Conservatory of Brussels when she was eight years old; she studied there for 10 years.

== Career ==
=== 1986–1993: Early music career ===
During the 1980s, Fabian entered a number of European competitions and won several prizes. She released her first single, "L'Aziza est en pleurs" / "Il y avait", in 1986.

In 1988, the RTL TV channel in Luxembourg invited Fabian to represent the country at the 33rd Eurovision Song Contest, held that year in Dublin, Ireland. The song was a composition by Jacques Cardona and Alain Garcia entitled "Croire" (Believe), which reached fourth place (while Celine Dion won the contest representing Switzerland). The single became a hit in Europe, selling nearly 500,000 copies.

In 1990, Fabian and musical collaborator Rick Allison moved to Montreal, Quebec, Canada, to embark on a career in North America. They started their own music label and publishing company, Productions Clandestines.

In August 1991, her self-titled French-language debut album, Lara Fabian, was released in Canada and sold over 100,000 copies. The success of upbeat dance-pop singles such as "Le jour où tu partiras", "Les murs", and "Qui pense à l'amour" gave Fabian radio exposure. She received several nominations at the 1993 ADISQ Awards, and a poll published around that time voted her Québec's most promising singer.

=== 1994–1996: Breakthrough album: Carpe diem ===
Constant touring in Québec helped Fabian's 1994 album Carpe diem become her breakthrough album. The album went gold three weeks after its release, and spawned three hit singles: "Tu t'en vas", "Si tu m'aimes", and "Leïla". The following year, the album went double platinum.

Fabian received two Félix Awards at the 1995 ADISQ gala: Best Show of The Year and Best Female Singer of The Year (a category that is voted for by the public).

In 1996, Walt Disney Studios hired Fabian as the voice of the character of Esmeralda in the Canadian French version of the animated feature The Hunchback of Notre Dame. Disney also included "Que Dieu aide les exclus", Fabian's French version of the song "God Help The Outcasts", on the film's English soundtrack album alongside Bette Midler's version.

Since 1996, Lara Fabian has also held Canadian citizenship alongside her original Belgian passport.

=== 1997–1999: Mainstream international success: Pure and Live ===
After the success of Carpe diem, Fabian signed a contract with the French Polydor label for several albums and Pure was released in June 1997. Pure sold more than two million copies in France; the album went platinum in less than two weeks, and spawned several hit singles: "Tout", "Je t'aime", "Humana", "Si tu m'aimes", and the anti-homophobia anthem "La Différence". The album won a Félix Award for Popular Album of the Year at the 1997 ADISQ gala and was nominated for two Juno Awards in the Best Selling French Album category, and for Fabian as Best Female Singer.

In February 1998, Fabian received the Discovery of the Year award during the Victoires de la Musique Gala. Also in 1998, Polydor released Carpe diem in Europe. In November 1998, she received the Félix Award for Artist with the Most Recognition Outside Quebec at the 'ADISQ Gala'. In December, she was named as Revelation of the Year by Paris Match, which put her on its cover to mark this occasion.

In March 1999, Fabian released her first live album, named Live, which debuted at No. 1 on the French charts. This helped seal an international recording contract with Sony Music. In May 1999, Fabian was honoured at the World Music Awards in Monaco as the best-selling Benelux artist. In July 1999, with over six million records already sold across Europe, Polydor rereleased Fabian's self-titled debut album.

=== 1999–2001: Extension of success to the US and Latin America: Lara Fabian ===
In the summer of 1999, Fabian recorded her first English-language album, Lara Fabian, in New York and San Francisco for the Sony label. The songs were written and produced with Rick Allison and Dave Pickell, Walter Afanasieff, Glen Ballard and Patrick Leonard.

The album debuted at No. 1 on the Billboard 'Heatseekers' album chart, reached No. 1 on the French album chart, and was No. 2 on the Belgian album chart. For the Asian version of the album, Fabian collaborated with American-Taiwanese pop star Leehom Wang on the song "Light of My Life".

The dance-pop song "I Will Love Again", her first English single, reached No. 1 on the US Billboard Hot Dance Music/Club Play, and peaked No. 32 on the Billboard Hot 100, No. 10 Adult Contemporary, as well as appearing in several international charts. This included the UK Singles Chart, where it peaked at No. 63. The follow-up ballad, "Love By Grace", entered the Adult Contemporary chart, peaking at No. 24. In February 2001, "Love By Grace" became the theme song of the lead couple in the Brazilian soap opera Laços de Família, broadcast by Rede Globo in Brazil and Portugal. For several weeks, the song was number 1 on most Brazilian and Portuguese radio stations. The third single, the dance-pop song "I Am Who I Am", remixed by Hex Hector, did not chart. In Europe, the single "Adagio" charted at No. 5 on the French singles chart and No. 3 on the Belgian singles chart.

During this period, Fabian recorded songs for several Hollywood motion picture soundtracks, including "The Dream Within" for the Final Fantasy: The Spirits Within soundtrack, and "For Always" for the AI:Artificial Intelligence soundtrack, which contained both a solo version and a duet with Josh Groban.

=== 2001–2003: O Canada 2001 and return to French roots: Nue, Live 2002 and En toute intimité ===
Nue (Naked), Fabian's fourth French album, was released in the Fall of 2001 in both Québec and France. Nue is a documentation of her emotional ride in the years since success of the previous album. The album reached No. 1 in Belgium and No. 2 in France but had little impact in Québec. The album was also released in Portugal and reached the top 10 on the album charts during the Fall of 2001.

The first single, released in the summer of 2001, was the anthem "J'y crois encore," which was a top 20 French hit. Other singles followed, including "Immortelle", "Aimer Déjà," and in 2002 "Tu es mon autre" (a duet with fellow Belgian, Maurane, which was nominated for song of the year and reached the top 5 in France).

Also in 2001, she collaborated with David Foster and the Vancouver Symphony Orchestra to record the Canadian national anthem, O Canada, in an English version, a French version, and a bilingual (French/English) version, for a promotion of the Government of Canada.

In 2002, Fabian contributed to the World Soccer Championship CD release, with the song World at Your Feet written and produced by Gary Barlow.

Towards the end of 2002, Fabian released her second live album, Live 2002, from her latest tour, together with a DVD showcasing concerts recorded in December 2001 in Belgium at the Forest National and at Le Zénith in Paris.

Her 2003 stint at the Casino de Paris every Monday night consisted of concerts to small audiences, which were released as a live CD and DVD at the end of 2003, under the title En toute intimité.

=== 2004: Second English language release: A Wonderful Life ===
In June 2004, Fabian released her second English album, A Wonderful Life.

The project was commercially unsuccessful but critically praised. The more organic sound on the album is attributed to the work of French guitarist Jean-Félix Lalanne, and producers Desmond Child, Anders Bagge and the British team True North (composed of Take That singer Gary Barlow and Elliot John Kennedy). "Review My Kisses", written by Desmond Child, was first recorded by LeAnn Rimes in 2002 for her album Twisted Angel.

The first single released for radio was "The Last Goodbye" in the US and a number of other countries (except France). In France, the song "No Big Deal" was the first single. Neither of the songs achieved success and the album was not promoted; and its release was cancelled in the United States.

In Brazil, the song "I Guess I Loved You" achieved moderate success when included on a soap opera entitled "Senhora do Destino" (Her own Destiny), a well-known Brazilian television series. The song also gained some popularity in Portugal, for the same reason, though it was never officially released or promoted.

In 2004, in the MGM film De-Lovely, Fabian performed the numbers "Another Openin', Another Show" (with chorus) and "So in Love" (with Mario Frangoulis) from the Cole Porter musical Kiss Me, Kate.

=== 2005–2006: A new musical direction: 9 and Un Regard 9 ===
After a sabbatical in 2004, Fabian returned to the music scene spring of 2005 with her fifth French album, 9. The album is performed in a new style, with smoothness, serenity and joy, a departure from the deep, dramatic style of earlier recordings.

9 yielded the hit single "La Lettre", a song co-written with her new partner, Jean-Félix Lalanne, with whom she produced the album's 11 tracks. Other singles released included "Ne lui parlez plus d'elle", "Un Ave Maria", "Il ne manquait que toi" and the gospel-infused "L'homme qui n'avait pas de maison".

In October 2006, Fabian released a CD and DVD of this associated tour, both titled Un regard 9 Live and recorded during the concert of 29 March 2006, at Le Zénith in Paris. The CD presents 15 live performances and a new song, "Aime", recorded in a studio in Montreal, Quebec.

=== 2006–2007: An Italian collaboration and live concerts in Europe ===
In June 2007 Fabian worked in Rome and Los Angeles to record tracks for her next studio album.

In the meantime, the single "Un cuore malato " (with Gigi D'Alessio) reached the top of the Italian charts and No. 16 in France.

In Los Angeles, Fabian worked with Dave Stewart on a multilingual album, reputed to include songs in English, Spanish, French, Italian, and a few other languages. This album was planned for release in late 2008.

Also in 2007, Fabian was in Québec to perform a two-night concert at the Olympia de Montreal. In October she was a surprise guest at a concert Gigi D'Alessio gave in France at the Olympia in Paris. Soon after, her daughter was born.

=== 2009: Return to the music scene: Toutes les femmes en moi ===
A few months after her daughter's birth, Fabian carried out a tour of Ukraine, Russia and Greece. She also made a few TV appearances (such as 60th Anniversary of Israel where Fabian performed a Hebrew song and duetted with Israeli singer Noa).

During 2008, Fabian was in Belgium preparing to record a French album with pianist Mark Herskowitz. The album, Toutes les femmes en moi, was partly recorded in Montreal, and was released in May 2009. The first single, Soleil, Soleil, is a cover of the Nana Mouskouri song. The second single was Toutes les Femmes en moi, the only original song on the album.

=== 2010–2012: "Tour Les Femmes Font Leur Show", Mademoiselle Zhivago ===
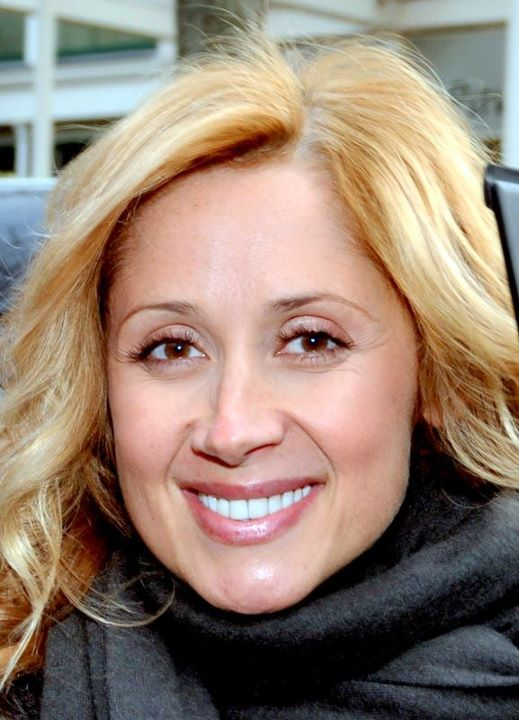
Fabian in 2012

Throughout the first half of 2010, Fabian embarked on a European tour of concerts, throughout France, Switzerland, and Belgium, incorporating the main repertoire of her last album Toutes Les Femmes En Moi along with some classic and fan favorites. She also performed again in Eastern Europe, with a more acoustic set (piano-voice), and included English recordings from the album Every Woman in Me. In September 2010, she finally released her 2009 album Toutes Les Femmes En Moi in Québec. She also recorded the album "Nuit Magique" with Canadian singer Coral Egan.

Later in 2010, Fabian released a concept album in Russia and Ukraine called Mademoiselle Zhivago which achieved success in Russia. It features 11 songs in different languages by Russian composer Igor Krutoy. It features stories about a woman who experiences several lives over the years and centuries. Eleven music videos, one each song, were combined to create a full-length film, produced and directed by Ukrainian film producer Alan Badoev. The album itself, containing a CD and a DVD, was first released in Ukraine in October 2010 and in Russia in November.

The whole set of songs composed by Fabian with Igor Krutoy is in English, French, Italian, Spanish, and Russian. She first introduced one of these songs in 2009 during the New Wave Festival in Latvia, performing "Demain n'existe pas". Later, in 2010, she returned to that same stage, performing new songs from the already finalized project. She has been promoting this project in both countries both on television and by performing a series of concerts presenting the new songs live to the eastern European public. Fabian was a guest performer on the show of 30 October of the Ukrainian X Factor, singing "Mademoiselle Hyde" and "Demain n'existe pas", taken from the album and also her longtime classic "Adagio".

In 2012, she sang "Ma solitude", a duet with Greek singer George Perris, on his album Un Souhait.

=== 2013: Le Secret ===
Fabian released her new album Le Secret on 15 April 2013, which consists of 17 brand new songs. On the same day of the album release, she showcased her new songs at the Théâtre de Paris. Her first single is "Deux ils, Deux elles", released 20 February 2013. The song talks about the love between two men and two women, speaks about tolerance and acceptance of the LGBT community – just like her previous song "La Différence".

=== 2014: "Make Me Yours Tonight" / "Al Götür Beni" ===
Planned tour dates in early 2014 were cancelled and recording delayed while Fabian recovered from ear damage. In August she released a duet with Turkish Artist Mustafa Ceceli. The title, "Make Me Yours Tonight," written by Anthony James and Yiorgos Bellapaisiotis, was released as an EP in English and Turkish versions ("Al Götür Beni"), as well as in additional "acoustic" versions.

=== 2015: Performer at the 65th Sanremo, Essential Lara Fabian and Greatest Hits Tour 2015 ===
On 14 December 2014, during L'Arena, broadcast on the Italian channel Rai 1, presenter Massimo Giletti and guest Carlo Conti revealed the names of the new performers at the 65th Sanremo Music Festival. Fabian was announced as being one of the 20 singers in the "Big" (main) category. It was the second time she has appeared on the Ariston stage (since her guest featuring in 2007 with Gigi D'Alessio) and the first time as a solo competitor. In several interviews, she dedicated her performance to her mother. Fabian called the song she decided to submit "A hymn to lightness, to enthusiasm".

On the evening show on 10 February 2015, Fabian performed her new single "Voce" for the Italian market. It is to be included in a new greatest hits album, Essential Lara Fabian, specifically released in the country by Warner Italy.

On the evening of 12 February 2015, a visibly moved Fabian sang on the same stage "Sto male", Ornella Vanoni's Italian version of her already popular rendition of "Je suis malade". This was the night of the Sanremo sub-competition for cover versions; she eventually lost to Nek and his "Se telefonando," formerly popularized by Mina.

On the evening of 13 February, she performed "Voce", once more, before losing the entire competition. She was already pending since the premiere. An article in the local San Remo Festival publication, "Farewell to foreigners at Sanremo", written by Erika Cannoletta, maintained that a lack of meritocracy and obscure political issues backstage had contributed to the reasons that led to the elimination of the artist. Before this, the Italian audience and press were generally rather cold towards Fabian, especially in relation to her fame in the country. In a fairly scathing and controversial article titled "Sanremo 2015, who is Lara Fabian? The international star whom nobody ever heard of", writer and music critic Michele Monina (of Il Fatto Quotidiano) questioned the fame, career and quality of the singer, generating a heated debate on its comment section.

On 15 February, she performed one last time on Domenica In, Rai 1, receiving a standing ovation. The singer will reprise her tour in support of her new release beginning from 21 February 2015, by performing at the Nokia Arena, Tel Aviv, Israel.

=== 2015: Ma vie dans la tienne ===
In November 2015, Lara released her 9th studio album, titled Ma vie dans la tienne ("My Life In Yours"), consisting of songs she co-wrote and co-composed with David Gategno and Elodie Hesme. The album, which was released under license by Warner Music France, included the singles "Quand je ne chante pas", "Ma vie dans la tienne", "L'oubli" and "Ton désir". The album was certified "Platinum" in France, Gold in Belgium, and has sold over 150,000 copies worldwide.

=== 2016–2018: Camouflage and world tour ===
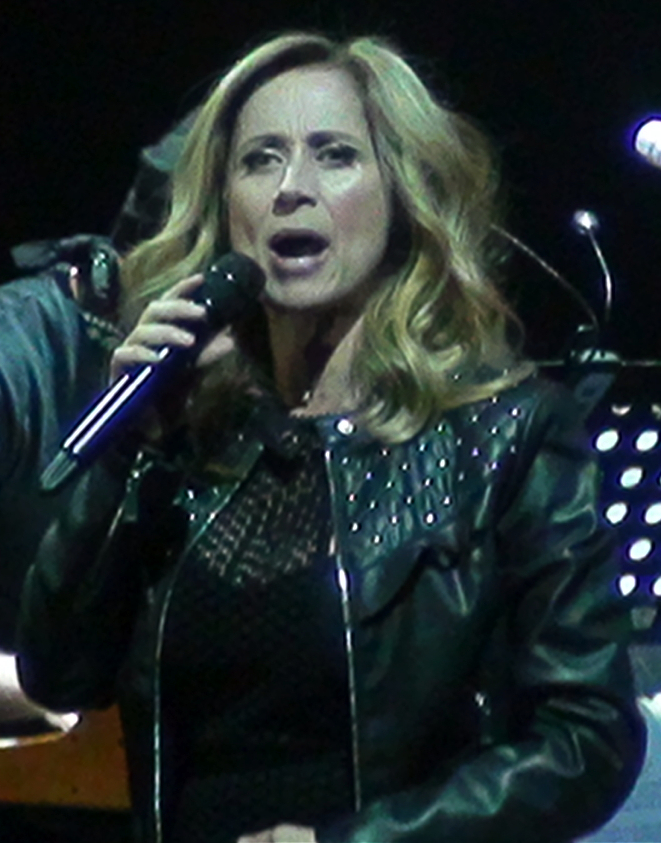
Fabian performing in 2018

In 2016, Fabian began work on a new English album, her 13th studio album, planned for release in 2017 under the title Camouflage, with a Swedish-American music production team . The album consists of 12 titles and was available for pre-order on 4 August 2017. A first single, "Growing Wings", was released on the same date. The second single of the album was "Choose What You Love Most (And Let It Kill You)." The Camouflage World Tour, produced by her new producer and manager Matt Ersin, started in Miami on 2 February 2018. She toured throughout the world, making 40 appearances, ending the tour in Paris, in June 2018. During the concert dates in Russia, producer Matt Ersin's refusal to exclude the track "La Différence", which depicts images of same-sex couples in the stage visuals, from the show, caused a legal quagmire with the Russian authorities.

=== 2018–2020: Papillon & World Tour ===
In September 2018, Fabian announced the release of her new single, "Papillon". Written by Fabian, Moh Denebi and Sharon Vaughn. The single was released on 5 October 2018. It's the first single from her fourteenth album, also titled Papillon, released on 8 February 2019. To support the release of the album, Lara Fabian embarked upon the 50 World Tour with a concert in New York at the Beacon Theatre on 16 September 2019, before moving on to visit over 20 other locations across the US, Russia and Europe. The tour celebrates her 50th birthday, three decades in the music industry and 14 studio albums. Lara Fabian claims 20 million records sold. However, according to various media, her official record sales are estimated at 12 million worldwide.

In February 2019, Fabian separated from the management company Odacity and producer/manager Matt Ersin, who managed her career since 2015. Subsequently, she entrusted the coordination of the upcoming "50 World Tour" to the Romanian company "ICT Agency" (International Creative Talents). Payment issues between Fabian and ICT culminated in her cancelling of various concerts. The remaining dates of the tour were postponed following the escalation of the COVID-19 pandemic.

=== 2020–present: Lockdown Sessions and Je suis là ===
On 16 December 2020, Lara Fabian discreetly unveiled a collection of 12 experimental musical tracks, an outcome of her introspection and her isolation during the COVID-19 lockdown. Lockdown Sessions came out in a limited edition without a label, and offers a journey of the singer accompanied again by Moh Denebi.

She takes on the role of director of Star Académie on TVA in 2021.

She has also had occasional roles as an actress, most notably in the 2022 film Arlette.

On 29 November 2024, she released the French album Je suis là.

== Artistry ==
Fabian is a soprano with a vocal range that spans three octaves from C3 to G5 in live performances. Beginning 2001–2004, the French media began referring to Fabian as one of the grandes voix québécoises ("great Quebecois voices") at the centre of contemporary trends in popular music. Other singers grouped in this category included Isabelle Boulay, Céline Dion, Natasha St-Pier, Garou, Daniel Lavoie, Lynda Lemay, Bruno Pelletier and Roch Voisine. However, the musicologist Catherine Rudent concludes that only Boulay, Dion and St-Pier truly resemble Fabian in répertoire, voice and techniques of interpretation. These singers have in common a style inherited from soul music, in which expressive vocality takes priority over the text, making full use of registers of the chest and head, vocal ornamentation and improvisation.

In addition to her main languages, Fabian has also sung in Azerbaijani, German, Greek, Hebrew, Latin, Mandarin Chinese, Portuguese, Russian and Turkish.

== Writing for other artists ==
Fabian has written for other artists, such as French female singers Chimène Badi, Nolwenn Leroy, and Myriam Abel. She also composed for Daniel Lévi and is said to be currently working with a former contestant from "Nouvelle Star 3", Roland. She has often praised the voice and talent of successful female singer Amel Bent, who was also a contestant on that show. She wrote "Dis-moi comment t'aimer" for Greek singer George Perris on his album Un Souhait. "Imaginer" was originally written in English, under the name 'Broken Vow', by Fabian and songwriter Walter Afanasieff. They rewrote the lyrics especially for Jackie Evancho, in French, for her album Dream with Me. The original meaning of the song, about a sad love, is completely changed in the French version to describe a dream of a beautiful world without war or hunger. She wrote the English lyrics for the song "Your Love", music by Igor Krutoy and interpreted by Dimash Qudaibergen.

== Personal life ==
Fabian is a polyglot. Raised as a native Sicilian and Italian speaker, she also learned French and some Flemish while living in Belgium, as well as English and Spanish, which she studied at school.

Fabian was in a relationship with Rick Allison, with whom she wrote her greatest hits, for 14 years until their separation in March 2003.

Fabian was in a relationship with French director, producer, and composer Gérard Pullicino that lasted from 2006 to 2012. They have a daughter together, born in 2007.

In June 2013, Fabian married Italian magician Gabriel Di Giorgio, a native of her mother's hometown of Acireale, Sicily, whom she had met upon her breakup with Pullicino.

After her career broke out from Canada in the 1990s, Fabian returned to Brussels in 2003 to be close to her parents in Belgium, and in 2015, she lived in Walloon Brabant province in Belgium, just outside Brussels. In 2017, she returned permanently to Montreal, Quebec, to be with her family. As of March 2026, she spends her spare time between Quebec and Catania, Sicily.

== Discography ==
- Lara Fabian (1991)
- Carpe Diem (1994)
- Pure (1996)
- Lara Fabian (1999)
- Nue (2001)
- A Wonderful Life (2004)
- 9 (2005)
- Toutes les femmes en moi (2009)
- Every Woman in Me (2009)
- Mademoiselle Zhivago (2010)
- Le Secret (2013)
- Ma vie dans la tienne (2015)
- Camouflage (2017)
- Papillon (2019)
- Lockdown Sessions (2020)
- Je suis là (2024)

== Tours and residencies ==
- En Toute Intimité (2003)
- Un regard 9 Live (2006)
- Tour Les femmes font leur show (2010)
- Greatest Hits Tour (2015)
- Ma vie dans la tienne Tour (2016)
- Camouflage World Tour (2018)
- 50 World Tour (2019–2020)
- The Best of Lara Fabian – World Tour (2022)
- Je T'Aime World Tour (2025–2026)

== Awards ==
- Etoile Cherie FM Awards
  - 2005 – Best Female Star of the Year
- Félix Awards
  - 1995 – Best Show of the Year – Songwriter/Performer
  - 1995 – Female Vocalist of the Year
  - 1997 – Popular Album of the Year – Pure
  - 1998 – Artist with most Recognition Outside of Quebec
  - 2000 – Quebec Artist Having Biggest Success in a Language Other Than French
- IFPI Platinum Europe Awards
  - 1999 – Award for Sales Over 2 Million Units
- NRJ Music Awards Nomination
  - 2000 – Francophone Female Artist of the Year
- Victoires de la Musique
  - 1998 – Revelation of the Year
- Women to Women Without Borders
  - 2000 – Gold Medal
- World Music Awards
  - 1999 – Best Selling Benelux Recording Artist of the Year
  - 2001 – Best Selling Benelux Artist of the Year
- Juno Award Nominations
  - 1996 – Best New Solo Artist of the Year
  - 1996 – Best Selling Francophone Album of the Year – Carpe Diem
  - 1998 – Best Female Vocalist of the Year
  - 1998 – Best Selling Francophone Album of the Year – Pure
  - 2001 – Best Female Artist
- SOCAN Awards
  - 1995 – Pop/Rock Music – Il suffit d'un éclair
  - 1996 – Pop/Rock Music – Leila
  - 1998 – Pop/Rock Music – Humana
  - 2004 – International Achievement Award

== Bibliography ==
- Fabian, Lara (2021). Tout – Je passe à table [Everything – I'm sitting at the table] (in French). Montréal: Libre Expression. ISBN 978-2764813485.

== See also ==
- List of number-one dance hits (United States)
- List of artists who reached number one on the US Dance chart

== Notes ==
Preceded by Plastic Bertrand with "Amour, Amour"	Luxembourg in the Eurovision Song Contest; 1988	Succeeded by Park Café with "Monsieur"
