= Pure (Lara Fabian album) =

Studio album by Lara Fabian
- Released: 1996; June 3, 1997
- Recorded: 1996
- Studios: Rick's Studio (Studio Marko); Studio Morin Heights
- Genre: Pop
- Length: 48:30
- Labels: Polydor; PolyGram
- Producers: Rick Allison; Lara Fabian

Lara Fabian chronology
Carpe Diem (1994)	Pure (1996)	Live (1999)

Pure is the third studio album released by Lara Fabian. Her first album released outside of Canada, it went platinum in less than two weeks and eventually received a Diamond certification in France. It won a Félix Award for Popular Album Of The Year at the 1997 ADISQ gala and was also nominated in the Best Selling French Album category. It contains the song "La différence", which protested against homophobia.

== Track listing ==
#	Title	Music	Lyrics	Time
1	"Tout"	Rick Allison	Lara Fabian	04:16
2	"Si tu m'aimes"	Rick Allison	Lara Fabian	03:30
3	"J'ai zappé"	Vincenzo Thoma	Dominique Owen	05:06
4	"La Différence"	Rick Allison	Lara Fabian	04:12
5	"Humana"	Rick Allison	Lara Fabian	05:39
6	"Urgent désir"	Daniel Lavoie, Mario Proulx	Daniel Lavoie	03:57
7	"Les Amoureux de l'an deux mille"	Rick Allison	Lara Fabian	04:54
8	"Ici"	Daniel Seff	Lara Fabian	03:26
9	"Alléluia"	Daniel Seff, Rick Allison	Lara Fabian	04:08
10	"Je t'aime"	Rick Allison	Lara Fabian	04:21
11	"Je t'appartiens"	Janey Clewer	Lara Fabian	03:23
12	"Perdere l'amore"	Marcello Marrocchi	Giampiero Artegiani	05:04

== Critical reception ==
Professional ratings
Review scores
Source	Rating
AllMusic	4/5 stars
Le Son de Gaston	favorable
Public.fr	mixed

Pure received generally favorable reviews from music critics.

== Charts ==
Chart (1998)	Peak position
Belgian Albums (Ultratop Wallonia)	3
European Albums (Music & Media)	19
French Albums (SNEP)	3

== Certifications ==
Region	Certification	Certified units/sales
Belgium (BRMA)	Platinum	50,000^{*}
Canada (Music Canada)	Platinum	100,000^{^}
France (SNEP)	Diamond	1,000,000^{*}
Switzerland (IFPI Switzerland)	Platinum	50,000^{^}
Summaries
Europe (IFPI)	2× Platinum	2,000,000^{*}
^{*} Sales figures based on certification alone.^{^} Shipments figures based on certification alone.
