= Rick Allison =

Belgian-born Canadian singer, author and record producer (born 1964)

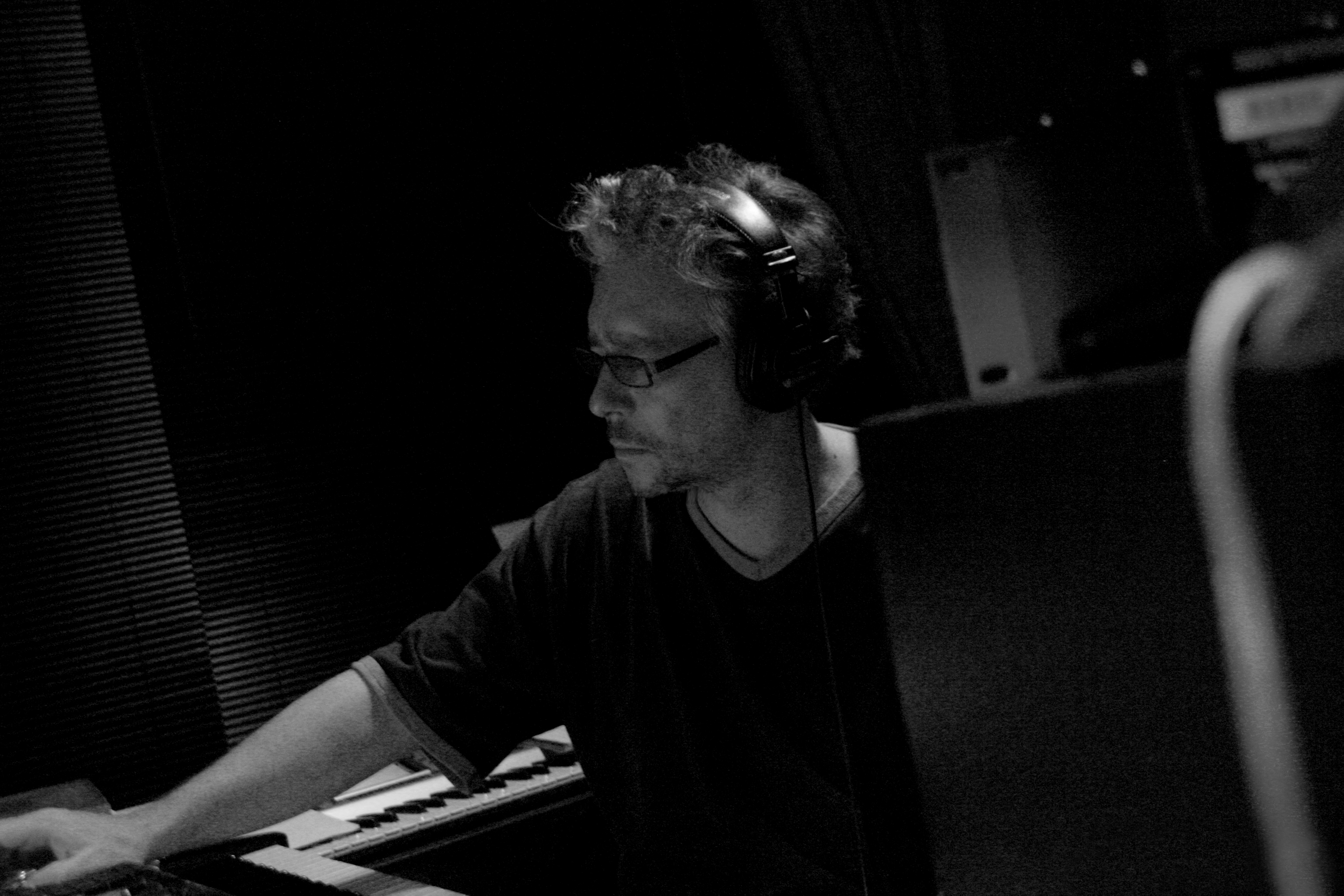
Rick Allison

Rick Allison (born Éric Vleminckx, 17 July 1964 in Brussels) is a Belgian-born Canadian singer, author and record producer.

== Biography ==
In 1990, Allison met singer Lara Fabian in a piano-bar in Brussels. They started writing their first songs together and went to Montréal in 1991 to work on Fabian's first album. This record came out in 1991 in Canada and was a huge commercial success. Allison produced Fabian's following francophone albums Carpe Diem, Pure and Nue, all of which performed very well and spawned several hit singles in Canada and French-speaking Europe. He also worked on her first English-language album Lara Fabian.

For the Eurovision Song Contest in 2002, Allison wrote the music for the French entry, "Il faut du temps" by Sandrine François. That same year, he contributed three songs on Johnny Hallyday's album À la vie, à la mort, including the single Pense à moi.

Allison's other major successes as a producer include the album De l'amour le mieux by Natasha St-Pier (2002) and Chimène Badi's debut album Entre nous (2003). De l'amour le mieux was the third studio album by St-Pier; it reached third position on the album charts in France and Belgium (Wallonia). Badi's album Entre nous reached fourth position on the French albums chart and the single of the same name topped the French Singles Chart. Later on he worked with other young female singers, including Nolwenn Leroy, Julie Zenatti and Élodie Frégé.

In March 2003, Allison and Fabian, who had been a couple in real life, broke up and also ended their professional relationship. This was followed by a series of legal battles over the use of the copyright of Fabian's songs. Allison also contributed five songs to Chimène Badi's hit album Dis-moi que tu m'aimes and worked on two songs Michel Sardou's album Du plaisir.

Since, he has composed songs for several French and French-Canadian singers such as Gino Quilico, Vincent Niclo, Marc-André Fortin, Suzie Villeneuve and Magalie Vaé, for whom he produced the album Magalie in 2006.

In 2004, Allison won the International Achievement Award with co-writer Lara Fabian at the Francophone SOCAN Awards in Montreal.

- 1991: The eponymous 1991 album of Lara Fabian released by Allison along with single Qui pense à l'amour?
- 1993: Écris moi and Quelle heure est-il à Montréal in the album Pourquoi tu pars of Nancy Martinez
- 1995: Album Carpe Diem of Lara Fabian released by Allison
- 1996: Album Pure of Lara Fabian released by Allison along with singles Tout, Humana, Je t'aime, Si tu m’aimes and La différence
- 1998: Album Prends-moi of Patrick Fiori released by Allison along with singles Elle est and J’en ai mis du temps
- 1999: Single De la peau for Sandy Valentino, written with Lara Fabian
- 1999: Album Lara Fabian Live
- 1999: Album Chaque feu of Roch Voisine along with the single Et si
- 2001: Album Nue of Lara Fabian released by Allison along with the singles J'y crois encore, Immortelle, Aimer déjà et Tu es mon autre
- 2001: Duo Et maintenant by Lara Fabian and Florent Pagny for the album 2 of the last
- 2002: Music for the song Il faut du temps of Sandrine François, in collaboration with Patrick Bruel ( which has been the song for the contestant from France for the Eurovision song contest)
- 2002: Single Le jour J for Thibault Durand
- 2002: Six songs for the album Ange et étrange of Élisa Tovati including the music for the single J'avance (in collaboration with Pierre Ruben)
- 2002: Three songs for the album À la vie, à la mort of Johnny Hallyday including the single Pense à moi
- 2003: Single Quelque chose pour quelqu’un of Damien Sargue
- 2003: Album Entre nous for Chimène Badi along with singles "Entre nous" and "Si j'avais su t'aimer"
- 2003: Song "Inévitablement" for Nolwenn Leroy in her album Nolwenn
- 2003: His own album Je suis un autre by Rick Allison
- 2004: Five songs in the album A Wonderful Life of Lara Fabian
- 2004: Song Moins de toi d'Élodie Frégé in her eponymous album
- 2004: Song L'âge que j'ai for Julie Zenatti in her album Comme vous
- 2004: Song Dis-moi moi pourquoi d'Audrey de Montigny in his album Audrey
- 2004: Songs La vie, la mort, etc. and J'aurais voulu t'aimer in the album Du plaisir of Michel Sardou
- 2004: Five songs in the album Dis-moi que tu m'aimes of Chimène Badi
- 2004: Album Un jour, une nuit of Gino Quilico
- 2005: Songs En toi and Si je te parle de moi in the album Non négociable of Marie Chantal Toupin
- 2006: Album Magalie of Magalie Vaé with the single Je ne suis qu'une chanson
- 2006: Ten songs for the album Un nom sur mon visage of Vincent Niclo
- 2006: Song Je reviens sur terre in the album Mon cœur est une pomme of Ariane Gauthier
- 2007: Song Je demande à la vie in the eponymous album of Marc-André Fortin
- 2008: Eight songs for the eponymous album of Suzie Villeneuve
- 2010: He releases the album Hit's Amore of Vincenzo Thoma also with the clip "Careless Whisper"
- 2012: His album "De l'interieur" includes his compositions which are more intimate
- 2014: He writes lyrics for the song "Le vent et le cri" on the music of Ennio Morricone performed by Romina Arena
- 2015: Producing and writing in collaboration the album of Lola Dargenti released in Canada in April, the single "La libertad" went into Top 5
- 2015: Released the single of Étienne Drapeau "Eres mi reina"
- 2016: He produce and writes two songs for the best-of by Marie-Chantal Toupin, "Merci" and "Derrière soi"
- 2017: He release the album "Una Via" of the Corsican band I Messageri in Bastia in the studio which he managed in the house he was staying in, instant success!
- 2017: He produces and writes the album of Fabrizio Zeva, Italo-Belgian artist
- 2017: He produces and writes in collaboration an EP for the American artist, born in Ukraine Dina Layzis
- 2017: Starts the writing for the musical comedy "RISE" in collaboration with Thierry Sforza
- 2018: Song "L'âge que j'ai" with Didier Golemanas in reprise in the album of Petula Clark
- 2018: He released the song "Comme une évidence" for the duo Lynda Lemay and Jean-Charles Wery
- 2018: He released several songs for the new album of Ginette Reno
