= La Voix season 11 =

La Voix
- Season 11
- Hosted by: Charles Lafortune
- Coaches: Corneille; Roxane Bruneau; France D'Amour; Mario Pelchat
- Winner: Rosemarie Boivin
- Winning coach: Roxane Bruneau
- Runner-up: Dayannha Édouard-Raphaël

Release
- Original network: TVA
- Original release: 18 January – 5 April 2026

Season chronology
- ← Previous; Season 10

Season 11 of La Voix broadcast from 18 January 2026 to 5 April 2026 on TVA. Corneille, Roxane Bruneau, France D'Amour, and Mario Pelchat all returned as coaches from the previous season for their third, second, second, and third seasons, respectively.

Charles Lafortune returned for his eleventh season as host.

On 5 April, Rosemarie Boivin from Team Roxane was announced as the winner of the season, marking Roxane Bruneau's first win as a coach. Boivin also became the second "stolen" artist to win in the show's history (Boivin was originally on Pelchat's team), following Stéphanie St-Jean's victory in the fourth season.

== Coaches and host ==
In June 2025, it was announced that La Voix would return after a one-year hiatus. In October 2025, it was announced that all four coaches from the previous season would return for the eleventh season. Corneille and Mario Pelchat both returned for their third seasons, while Roxane Bruneau and France D'Amour both returned for their second seasons.

Coaches and host of La Voix season 11

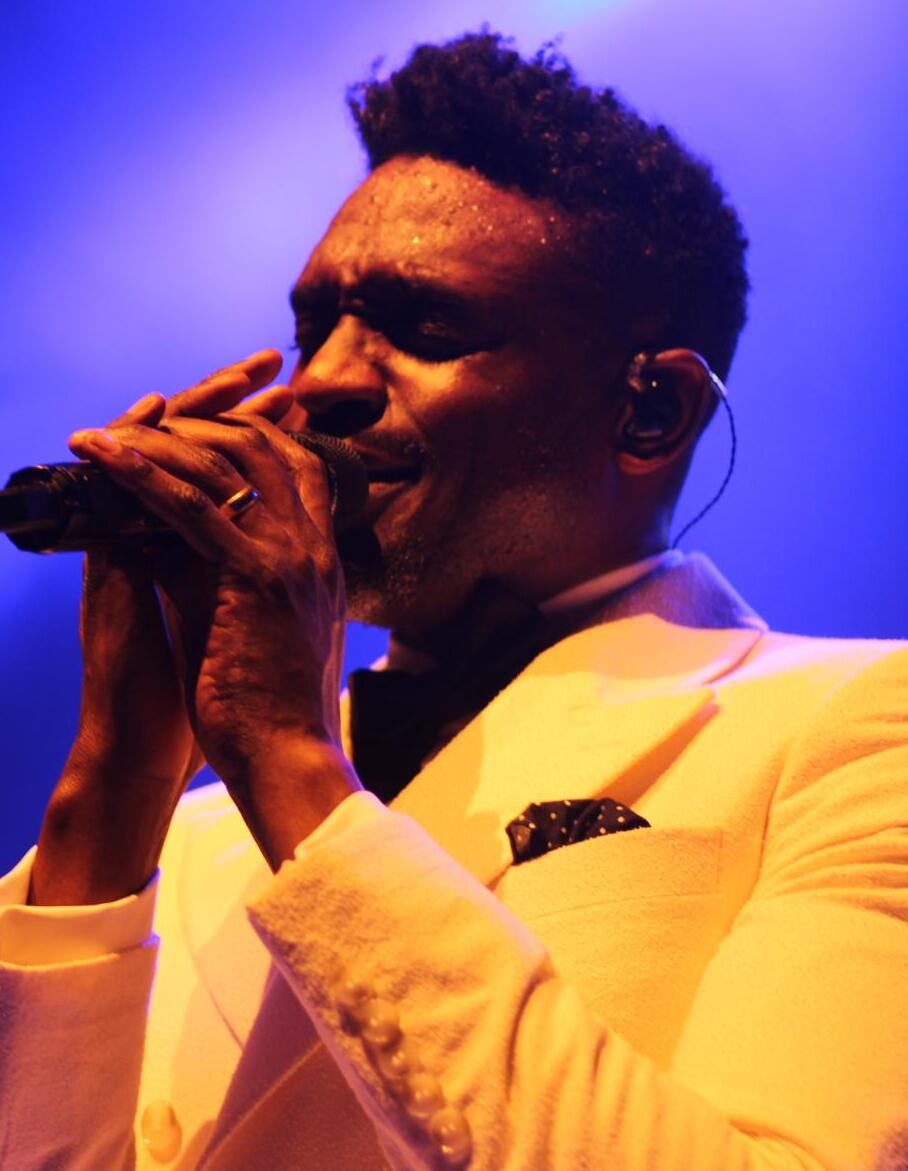
Corneille

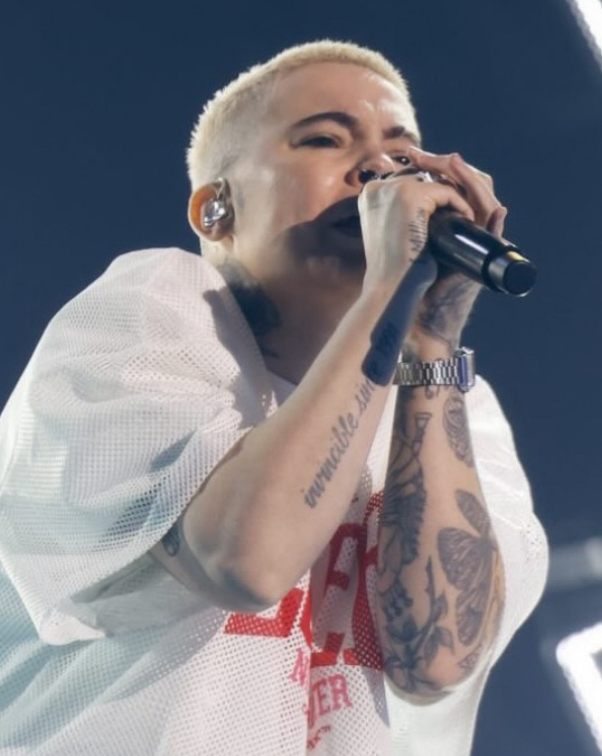
Roxane Bruneau

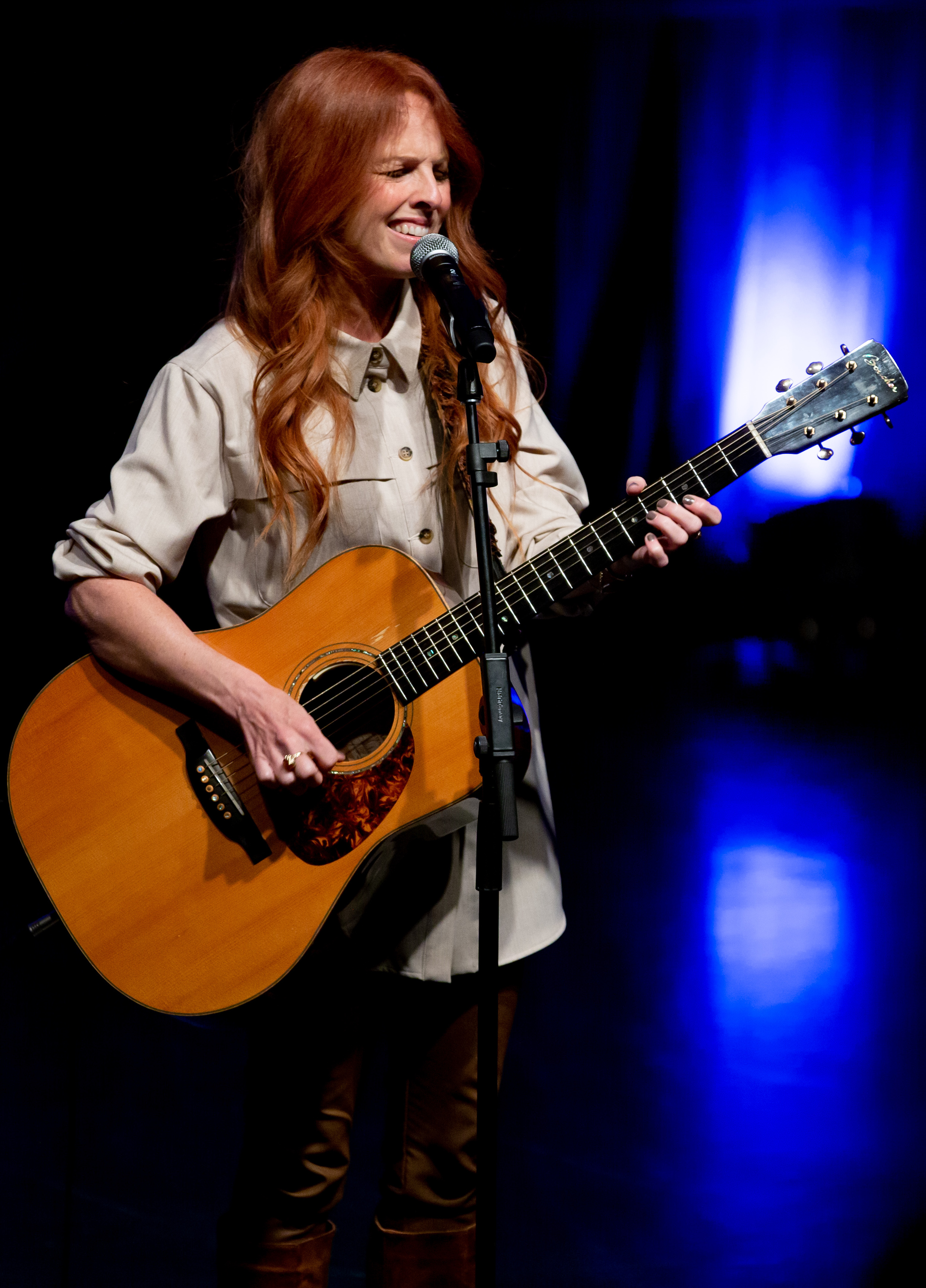
France D'Amour

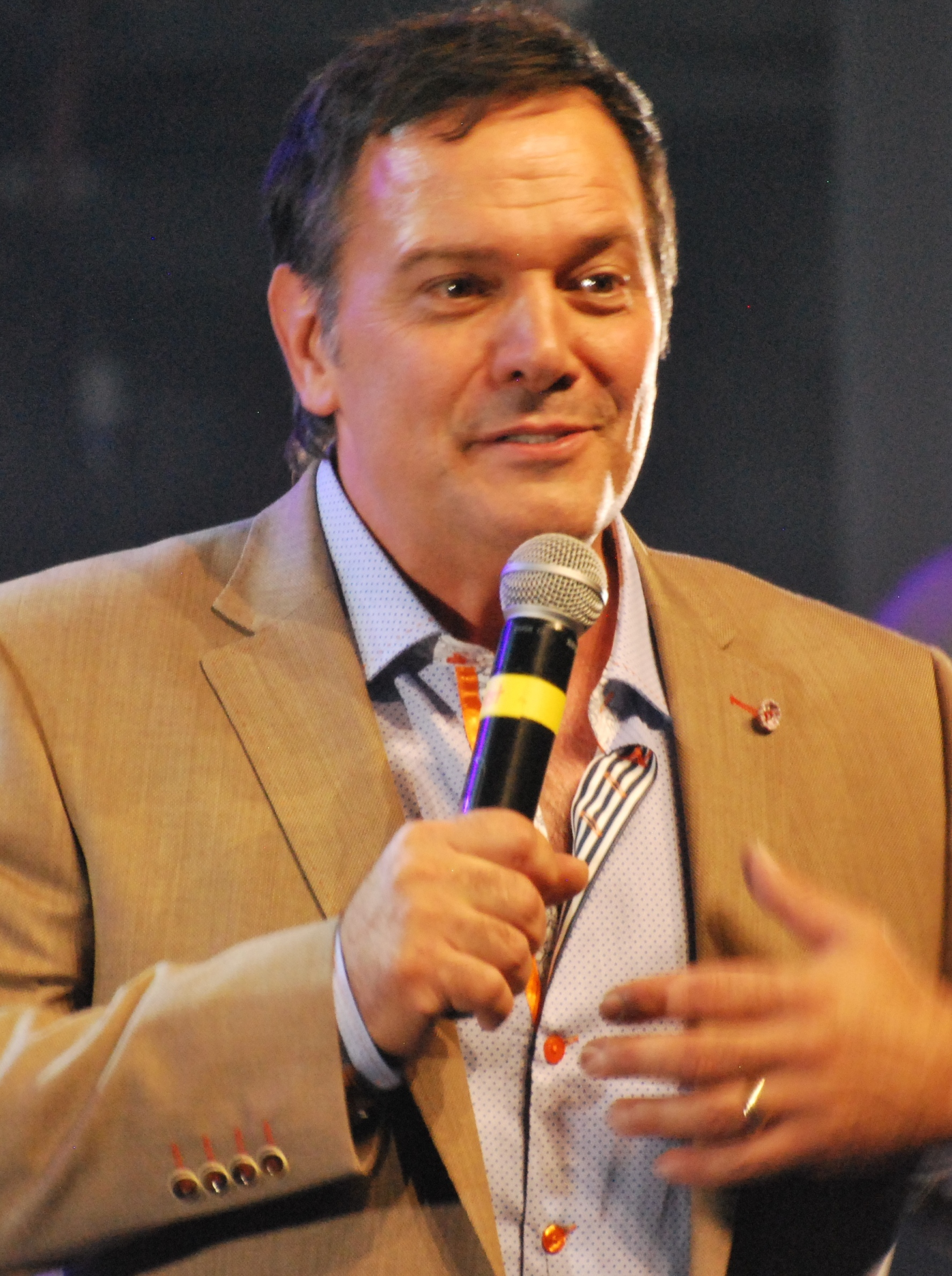
Mario Pelchat

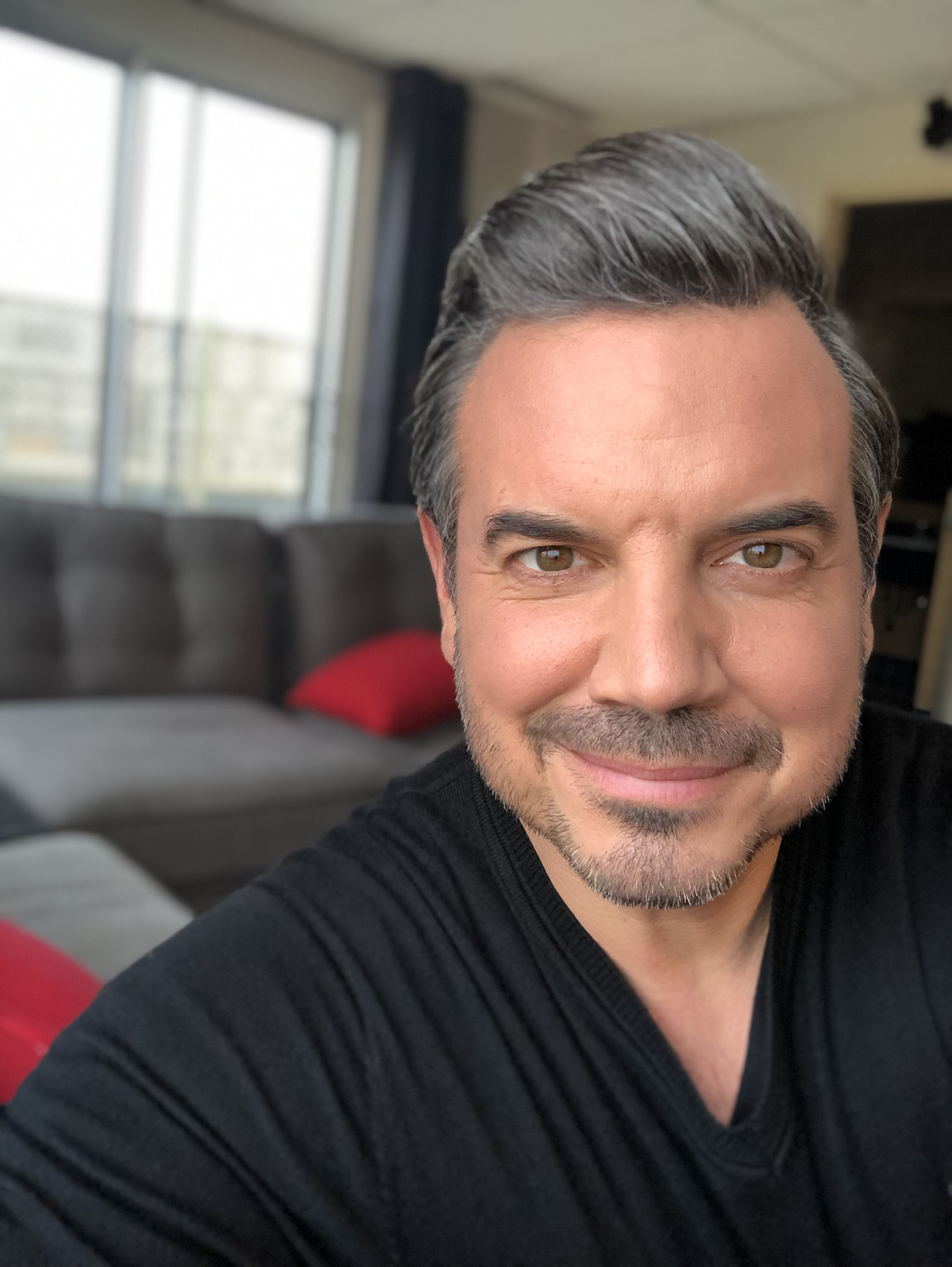
Charles Lafortune

== Teams ==
Each coach had 10 spots to fill in the Blind Auditions. Additionally, each coach can "steal" another artist in the Battles from another team, adding the artist to his/her team.

Color key

- Winner
- Runner-up
- Third place
- Fourth place
- Eliminated in the Semi final
- Eliminated in the Qualifications
- Stolen in the Battle rounds
- Eliminated in the Battle rounds

Coaches	Top 40 artists			
Corneille				
Corneille	Dayannha Édouard-Raphaël	Anissa Essalihi	Sam Champagne	Romy Dang
Corneille	Samy HMDI	Charlotte Lafortune	~~Maïka Pelchat~~	Olympe
Corneille	Patrick Marcotte	Gabriella Castro-Lévesque	Claudia Hayes	
Roxane Bruneau				
Roxane Bruneau	Rosemarie Boivin	Marie Des Neiges	Sarah Bourdon	Anthony Prégent
Roxane Bruneau	Mahé Rabesa	Émile Dubois	Nicolas Dorion	Zeina Abou-Jaoudé
Roxane Bruneau	Charlotte Désilets	Valérie Garon	Yan Etchevary	
France D'Amour				
France D'Amour	Roxanne Garceau	Alexis St-Pierre	Gabrielle Nessel	Guillaume Lecompte
France D'Amour	Isabelle Goulet	Zac Provençal	Mick Martel	Corinne Caza
France D'Amour	Isabel S. Morissette	Alexis Rousseau Tougas	Meggie Robert	
Mario Pelchat				
Mario Pelchat	Jason Coroa	Jade Mathieu	René Lajoie	Maïka Pelchat
Mario Pelchat	Jordan Grandmont	Justine & Samuel Thibault	~~Rosemarie Boivin~~	~~Romy Dang~~
Mario Pelchat	~~Isabelle Goulet~~	Michelle Lavallée	Alexis Tobia	
Note: Italicized names are stolen artists (names struck through within former teams).

== Blind auditions ==
In the blind auditions, each artist sings a song to four coaches who have their chairs turned away from the artist. If a coach is interested in working with an artist, he/she will press the "Je te veux" button and will then face the artist. If only one coach turns, the artist defaults to that team. If more than one coach turns, the artist chooses his/her coach. This season features the Block, which each coach can use once, down from twice last season, to prevent one of the other coaches from getting a contestant.

✔️	Coach pressed the "Je te veux" button
	Artist chose this coach's team
	Artist defaulted to the coach's team
	Artist received no turns and was eliminated
✘	Coach pressed the "Je te veux" button, but was blocked by Corneille from getting the artist
✘	Coach pressed the "Je te veux" button, but was blocked by Roxane from getting the artist
✘	Coach pressed the "Je te veux" button, but was blocked by France from getting the artist
✘	Coach pressed the "Je te veux" button, but was blocked by Mario from getting the artist

=== Episode 1 (18 January) ===
Order	Artist	Age	Song	Coach's and artist's choices			
Order	Artist	Age	Song	Corneille	Roxane	France	Mario
1	Yan Etchevary	32	"Mon amour"	✔	✔	✔	✘
2	Gabriella Castro-Lévesque	17	"Oscar Winning Tears"	✔	✔	✔	—
3	Rossomodo	30	"Dans la forêt des mal-aimés"	—	—	—	—
4	Isabel S. Morissette	38	"Mes blues passent pu dans porte"	✔	✔	✔	—
5	Jason Coroa	32	"Voilà"	✔	✔	✔	✔
6	Michelle Lavallée	55	"Cheek to Cheek"	—	—	—	✔
7	Zeina Abou-Jaoudé	27	"Allô maman bobo"	—	✔	—	—
8	Jessica Gagnon	34	"Life Is a Highway"	—	—	—	—
9	Jade Mathieu	17	"Parler"	✔	✔	✔	✔
10	Mick Martel	35	"Simple Man"	—	✔	✔	✔
11	Olympe	36	"SOS d'un terrien en détresse"	✔	✔	✔	✔

=== Episode 2 (25 January) ===
Order	Artist	Age	Song	Coach's and artist's choices			
Order	Artist	Age	Song	Corneille	Roxane	France	Mario
1	Roxanne Garceau	33	"Que la lune est belle ce soir"	✔	—	✔	—
2	Marcelin Ouellette	25	"La caravane"	—	—	—	—
3	Charlotte Lafortune	17	"The House of the Rising Sun"	✔	✔	✔	✔
4	Samstrong Nicolas Loco	24	"A Song for You"	—	—	—	—
5	Marie Des Neiges	42	"Trop d'amour"	✔	✔	—	—
6	Liana Adam	23	"If I Get High"	—	—	—	—
7	Alexis Tobia	27	"Indélébile"	—	—	—	✔
8	Jordan Grandmont	24	"All I Want"	✔	✔	✔	✔
9	Julia Shank	26	"Femme Like U"	—	—	—	—
10	Alexis Rousseau Tougas	18	"I Will Survive"	—	—	✔	—
11	Maïka Pelchat	23	"Collines"	✔	—	—	✔
12	Alexis St-Pierre	16	"Fernand"	—	✔	✔	—

=== Episode 3 (1 February) ===
Order	Artist	Age	Song	Coach's and artist's choices			
Order	Artist	Age	Song	Corneille	Roxane	France	Mario
1	Sarah Bourdon	40	"I Can't Make You Love Me"	✘	✔	✔	✔
2	Zac Provençal	17	"Je chante comme un coyote"	—	✔	✔	—
3	Antoinette Gobeil	18	"From the Start"	—	—	—	—
4	Claire Garand	75	"La voix humaine"	—	—	—	—
5	Meggie Robert	21	"Enough for You"	—	—	✔	—
6	Charlotte Désilets	24	"Orange Colored Sky"	—	✔	✔	—
7	Jérémie Roy	31	"Il y a tant à faire"	—	—	—	—
8	Romy Dang	16	"Mourir sur scène"	✔	✔	✔	✔
9	Claudia Hayes	27	"Ne m'en veux pas"	✔	—	—	—
10	Louis-David Simoneau	37	"Blanche comme la neige"	—	—	—	—
11	Sam Champagne	27	"La Quête"	✔	✔	—	✘
12	Mel Paiement	33	"Et je t'aime encore"	—	—	—	—
13	Justine & Samuel Thibault	27	"Something in the Orange"	✔	✔	✔	✔

=== Episode 4 (8 February) ===
Order	Artist	Age	Song	Coach's and artist's choices			
Order	Artist	Age	Song	Corneille	Roxane	France	Mario
1	Anthony Prégent	23	"Je déteste ma vie"	✔	✔	—	✔
2	Mario Martel	63	"I Was Made for Lovin' You"	—	—	—	—
3	Patrick Marcotte	20	"Je t'aime"	✔	—	—	—
4	Guillaume Lecompte	35	"Je redeviens le vent"	—	—	✔	✔
5	Karo Laurendeau	52	"It's a Heartache"	—	—	—	—
6	Virginie Gagnon-Bezeau	30	"You Ain't Woman Enough"	—	—	—	—
7	Mahé Rabesa	22	"Apolline"	✘	✔	✔	✔
8	David Brown	42	"Je sais, je sais"	—	—	—	—
9	René Lajoie	57	"Le France"	✔	—	—	✔
10	Corinne Caza	28	"The Climb"	—	—	✔	✔
11	Dayannha Édouard-Raphaël	17	"Make You Feel My Love"	✔	—	✔	✔
12	Flora Gionest-Roussy	30	"Constellations"	—	—	—	—
13	Rosemarie Boivin	23	"C'était l'hiver"	✔	✔	✔	✔

=== Episode 5 (15 February) ===
Order	Artist	Age	Song	Coach's and artist's choices			
Order	Artist	Age	Song	Corneille	Roxane	France	Mario
1	Anissa Essalihi	17	"Ghost Town"	✔	✔	✔	✔
2	Shuni Gauthier Kapesh	26	"Ensemble"	—	—	—	—
3	Valérie Garon	52	"À ma manière"	✔	✔	✔	✔
4	Asher Barrow	24	"La fin du show"	—	—	—	—
5	Sandrine Marin	26	"Bad Boy"	—	—	—	—
6	Samy HMDI	24	"La Bohème"	✔	✔	✔	—
7	Vithou	30	"Elle écoute pousser les fleurs"	Team full	—	—	—
8	Nicolas Dorion	30	"Make It Rain"	Team full	✔	—	—
9	Gabrielle Nessel	31	"When the Party's Over"	Team full	—	✔	—
10	Carl Miguel Maldonado	34	"I Want You to Know"	Team full	—	Team full	—
11	Isabelle Goulet	23	"The Mummers' Dance"	Team full	✔	Team full	✔
12	Émile Dubois	20	"Amsterdam"	Team full	✔	Team full	Team full

== Battles ==
In the battles, each coach pairs two of their artist together to perform a duet. The winner of each battle moves on to the Qualifications. Coaches are then given an opportunity to "steal" the loser if that artist is not on their team. Each coach has one "steal" to keep a loser in the competition and add them to their team, taking them to the next round. Artists who lose the battle and do not receive a "steal" are eliminated from the competition.

At the end of the round, each coach had five of their original artists and one stolen artist move on to the Qualifications. Corneille, Roxane, and France all used their steal on an artist from Team Mario, while Mario used his steal on an artist from Team Corneille.

Colour key:

Artist won the Battle and advanced to the Qualifications
Artist lost the Battle but was stolen by another coach and advanced to the Qualifications
Artist lost the Battle and was eliminated

Episode	Coach	Order	Winner	Song	Loser	'Steal' result			
Episode	Coach	Order	Winner	Song	Loser	Corneille	Roxane	France	Mario
Episode 6 (22 February)	Roxane Bruneau	1	Sarah Bourdon	"Die with a Smile"	Yan Etchevary	—	—N/a	—	—
Episode 6 (22 February)	France D'Amour	2	Alexis St-Pierre	"Lili"	Meggie Robert	—	—	—N/a	—
Episode 6 (22 February)	Corneille	3	Sam Champagne	"Je te laisserai des mots"	Claudia Hayes	—N/a	—	—	—
Episode 6 (22 February)	Mario Pelchat	4	René Lajoie	"Chanter"	Romy Dang	✔	—	—	—N/a
Episode 6 (22 February)	France D'Amour	5	Gabrielle Nessel	"Best Part"	Alexis Rousseau Tougas	Team full	—	—N/a	—
Episode 6 (22 February)	Roxane Bruneau	6	Marie Des Neiges	"Ayoye"	Valérie Garon	Team full	—N/a	—	—
Episode 7 (1 March)	Corneille	1	Charlotte Lafortune	"Est-ce que tu m'aimes?"	Olympe	Team full	—	—	—
Episode 7 (1 March)	France D'Amour	2	Guillaume Lecompte	"Viens danser"	Isabel S. Morissette	Team full	—	—N/a	—
Episode 7 (1 March)	Mario Pelchat	3	Jade Mathieu	"Toujours les vacances"	Alexis Tobia	Team full	—	—	—N/a
Episode 7 (1 March)	Corneille	4	Samy HMDI	"J'aurais voulu te dire"	Gabriella Castro-Lévesque	Team full	—	—	—
Episode 7 (1 March)	Mario Pelchat	5	Jordan Grandmont	"Picture"	Rosemarie Boivin	Team full	✔	✔	—N/a
Episode 7 (1 March)	Roxane Bruneau	6	Mahé Rabesa	"Happier Than Ever"	Charlotte Désilets	Team full	Team full	—	—
Episode 7 (1 March)	France D'Amour	7	Roxanne Garceau	"Jolene"	Corinne Caza	Team full	Team full	—N/a	—
Episode 8 (8 March)	France D'Amour	1	Zac Provençal	"Fou de toi"	Mick Martel	Team full	Team full	—N/a	—
Episode 8 (8 March)	Corneille	2	Dayannha Édouard-Raphaël	"Sign Your Name"	Maïka Pelchat	Team full	Team full	—	✔
Episode 8 (8 March)	Mario Pelchat	3	Justine & Samuel Thibault	"Quelque chose à raconter"	Isabelle Goulet	Team full	Team full	✔	Team full
Episode 8 (8 March)	Roxane Bruneau	4	Émile Dubois	"Love Me Tender"	Zeina Abou-Jaoudé	Team full	Team full	Team full	Team full
Episode 8 (8 March)	Corneille	5	Anissa Essalihi	"De trop"	Patrick Marcotte	Team full	Team full	Team full	Team full
Episode 8 (8 March)	Mario Pelchat	6	Jason Coroa	"Les Feuilles mortes"	Michelle Lavallée	Team full	Team full	Team full	Team full
Episode 8 (8 March)	Roxane Bruneau	7	Anthony Prégent	"Loadé comme un gun"	Nicolas Dorion	Team full	Team full	Team full	Team full

== Qualifications ==
The Qualifications aired on 15 March and 22 March. In this round, each episode, all four coaches had three of their artists sing for a spot in the semi-final. Two artists total per team advanced to the semi-final.

Colour key:

Artist was saved and moved on to the semi-final
Artist was eliminated

=== Episode 9 (15 March) ===
Order	Coach	Artist	Song
1	Roxane Bruneau	Rosemarie Boivin	"Lonely"
2	Roxane Bruneau	Émile Dubois	"Fermer les yeux"
3	Roxane Bruneau	Anthony Prégent	"Heal"
4	France D'Amour	Gabrielle Nessel	"Ça va, ça va"
5	France D'Amour	Zac Provençal	"La Ballade de Jean Batailleur"
6	France D'Amour	Isabelle Goulet	"Running Up That Hill"
7	Corneille	Charlotte Lafortune	"Mamma Mia"
8	Corneille	Samy HMDI	"C'est zéro"
9	Corneille	Romy Dang	"Way Too Long"
10	Mario Pelchat	Jordan Grandmont	"Sur ton épaule"
11	Mario Pelchat	Justine & Samuel Thibault	"Le banc des délaissés"
12	Mario Pelchat	Maïka Pelchat	"Le cœur en cavale"

=== Episode 10 (22 March) ===
Order	Coach	Artist	Song
1	Roxane Bruneau	Mahé Rabesa	"Le bonheur"
2	Roxane Bruneau	Sarah Bourdon	"Bird Set Free"
3	Roxane Bruneau	Marie Des Neiges	"Comme tu me l'as demandé"
4	France D'Amour	Guillaume Lecompte	"À toutes les fois"
5	France D'Amour	Roxanne Garceau	"You Never Can Tell"
6	France D'Amour	Alexis St-Pierre	"Grandpa (Tell Me 'Bout the Good Old Days)"
7	Mario Pelchat	Jason Coroa	"Je ne suis qu'une chanson"
8	Mario Pelchat	Jade Mathieu	"D'abord, c'est quoi l'amour"
9	Mario Pelchat	René Lajoie	"Bravo tu as gagné"
10	Corneille	Anissa Essalihi	"Dernière danse"
11	Corneille	Sam Champagne	"Don't Dream It's Over"
12	Corneille	Dayannha Édouard-Raphaël	"Petite Marie"

== Semi-final ==
The semi-final aired on 29 March. In this stage, the remaining Top 8 artists, two from each team, performed for one spot per team in the final. Unlike the previous season, each coach was guaranteed one finalist this season.

Artist advanced to the final
Artist was eliminated

Order	Coach	Artist	Song
1	Mario Pelchat	Jade Mathieu	"Le grain de sable"
2	Mario Pelchat	Jason Coroa	"You Are the Reason"
3	France D'Amour	Alexis St-Pierre	"Grandes personnes"
4	France D'Amour	Roxanne Garceau	"Secret"
5	Roxane Bruneau	Marie Des Neiges	"Creep"
6	Roxane Bruneau	Rosemarie Boivin	"Hallelujah"
7	Corneille	Anissa Essalihi	"Le plus fort c'est mon père"
8	Corneille	Dayannha Édouard-Raphaël	"Fais-moi un show de boucane"

=== Final ===
The final aired on 5 April. The top four artists each performed for the public vote and the winner of the season was announced at the end of the show.

At the end of the show, Rosemarie Boivin from Team Roxane was announced as the winner of the season, marking Roxane Bruneau's first win as a coach. Boivin also became the second "stolen" artist to win in the show's history (Boivin was originally on Pelchat's team), following Stéphanie St-Jean's victory in the fourth season.

Coach	Artist	Song	Result
Corneille	Dayannha Édouard-Raphaël	"Minable"	Runner-up
France D'Amour	Roxanne Garceau	"Mille après mille"	Fourth place
Mario Pelchat	Jason Coroa	"Le Blues du businessman"	Third place
Roxane Bruneau	Rosemarie Boivin	"Ton départ"	Winner
