= Qui sait chanter? season 2 =

Television game show season

Qui sait chanter?
- Season 2
- Starring: Rita Baga
- Hosted by: Phil Roy
- Winners: Good singers: 10; Bad singers: 3
- No. of episodes: Regular: 10; Special: 3; Overall: 13

Release
- Original network: Noovo
- Original release: 12 September – 12 December 2022

Season chronology
- ← Previous; Season 1

The second season of the Canadian French-language television mystery music game show Qui sait chanter? premiered on Noovo with a Wild West special on 12 September 2022.

== Gameplay ==
=== Format ===
According to the original South Korean rules, the guest artist and contestant must attempt to eliminate bad singers during its game phase. At the final performance, the last remaining mystery singer is revealed as either good or bad by means of a duet between them and one of the guest artists.

The contestant must eliminate one mystery singer at the end of each round, receiving CA$4,000 if they eliminate a bad singer. At the end of a game, if the contestant decides to walk away, they will keep the money had won in previous rounds; if they decide to risk for the last remaining mystery singer, they win CA$25,000 if a singer is good, or lose their all winnings if a singer is bad.

=== Rounds ===
1. Playback (French: Relecture)
  Six mystery singers are divided into pairs, in which each compete a lip sync battle against each other.
2. Access code (French: Code d'accès)
  The guest artist and contestant are presented with a video package containing possible clues by one of the mystery singers.
3. Interrogation (French: Interrogatoire)
  The guest artist and contestant may ask questions to the remaining mystery singers. Good singers are required to give truthful responses, while the bad singers must lie.

== Episodes ==
=== Guest artists ===
Legend:
Good singer
Bad singer
— The contestant chose to risk the money.
— The contestant chose to walk away with the money.

Episode		Guest artist (Note: Players' notes: For the returning guest artists (who also include foreigners and former good singers), names are displayed in italics.; For the mixed groups, names who identified as bad singers are displayed in italics.)	Contestant	Mystery singers (In their respective numbers and aliases)					
#	Date	Guest artist	Contestant	Elimination order					Winner
#	Date	Guest artist	Contestant	Lip sync			Access code	Interrogation	Winner
Special	12 September 2022	Paul Daraîche	Jacques LaBerge → $25,000	6. Sarah Tessier Hamelin; (Farmer's Wife)	5. Jose Manuel Aparicio; (Cowboy)	4. Nicolas Dulude; (Fisherman)	2. Anne-Marie Gagnon; (Soapmaker)	1. Tim Brink; (Lumberjack)	3. Marie-Ève Quirion; Cowgirl
1	19 September 2022	Andréanne A. Malette	Jude César → $25,000	4. Sébastien Bergeron; (Hip-hop Dancer)	2. Marie-Pierre Skeates; (Madame Bingo)	3. Maude Buisson; (Criminologist)	6. Zoé Arnold-Trottier; (Marilyn Monroe Lookalike)	5. Marie-Ève Ricard; (Yogi)	1. Léandre Desrosiers-Ménard; American Football Player
2	26 September 2022	France D'Amour	Guylaine Tremblay → $4,000	4. Pierre-Olivier Grondin; (Painter)	1. Britany Brisebois; (Mermaid)	5. Laurie Petit; (Diva)	2. Haingo Nirina; (Miss Madagascar)	3. Jean Proteau; (René Simard Lookalike)	6. Noemie Element; Activist
3	10 October 2022	Jean-François Breau	Ariane-Hébert Métellus → $12,000	1. Marie-Michèle Dion Bouchard; (Patissier)	2. Anne-Lise Nadeau; (Ultramarathon Runner)	4. Marie-Pierre de Brienne; (Violinist)	6. Kassandra Fradette; (Weather Forecaster)	3. Lana Dalida; (Astrologer)	5. Dee Joyce; Concierge
4	17 October 2022	FouKi	Julie Ranger → $25,000	1. Véronique Tremblay; (Motorcycle Rider)	3. Véronique Dion; (50s Fanatic)	2. Ali Minville; (Shoe Vendor)	5. Francis LaCelle; (Mixologist)	6. David Gagné; (Cartoonist)	4. Steffy Beyong; Medical Secretary
5	24 October 2022	Johanne Blouin	Alexandre des Roches → $16,000	5. Étienne Loigneau-Buteau; (Paramedic)	3. Matthew Armour; (Volleyball Player)	1. Claudia Côté; (Carpenter)	4. Mégane Cardinal; (Roller Derby Champion)	2. Sylvain Ostiguy; (Skier)	6. Mélisane Paquette-Oligny; Waitress
Special	31 October 2022	Rita Baga	Marianne LaRose-Galarneau → $8,000	2. Christophe Tessier; (Chucky)	3. Mariève Lapointe; (Vampire)	4. Kevin Julien; (Banshee)	6. Mathieu Abel; (Phantom of the Opera)	5. Simon Boisvert; (Freddy Krueger)	1. Rémi Cardin; Edward Scissorhands
6	7 November 2022	William Cloutier	Laurie Lambert → $25,000	1. Nicolas Toupin; (Surfer)	4. Maude Benoît-Pépin; (Accountant)	3. Gabriela Jovin-Mazon; (Dancing Queen)	2. Samantha Boucher; (Karateka)	6. Stéphane Pacquet; (Station Master)	5. Alexandrine Roy; Superheroine
7	14 November 2022	Roxane Bruneau	Nate Bolduc → $12,000	2. Geneviève Grenier; (Exterminator)	6. Rémi Nadeau; (Camp Teacher)	3. Sarah Faguy; (Ice Cream Vendor)	5. Soleil Dion; (Puppeteer)	4. Alexandra Schuller; (Gardener)	1. Guy Porlier; Darts Player
8	21 November 2022	Marc Déry	Marko Estrada → $12,000	1. Dominic Dagenais; (Trampoline Coach)	5. Julien Hardy; (Tennis Player)	6. Alexa Daoust; (Cheerleader)	3. Rafaëlle Leduc; (Nurse)	4. Carmen Sutra; (Drag Queen)	2. Audrey Sargent; Waacking Dancer
9	28 November 2022	Marjo	Andréanne Ouellet-Gagnon → $0	1. Marilyne Dubé; (Heavy Metal Fan)	6. Maxime Tremblay; (Chef)	3. Jonathan Huard; (Traffic Enforcer)	5. Marilou Martin; (Make-up Artist)	2. Annie Fortin; (Mama Soccer)	4. Diana Lebel; Sign Language Interpreter
10	5 December 2022	Boom Desjardins	Farah Jacques → $12,000	5. Stéphanie Deschamps; (Interior Designer)	6. Jessika Black; (Wrestler)	4. Mathieu Nuth; (University Professor)	1. Maude Zulauff; (Hippie)	2. Samuel Emond; (Badminton Player)	3. Maya Marin-Poulin; Pilgrim
Special	12 December 2022	Marc Hervieux	Sylvain Vigneau → $8,000	2. Eric Bernier; (Santa Claus)	6. Megan Jobin; (Fairy Godmother)	1. Frédérique Mousseau; (Clara the Nutcracker)	4. Myriam Grefford; (Christmas Elf)	3. Marianne Labonté; (Red-nosed Reindeer)	5. Julie DaSyllva; Christmas Nanny

=== Panelists ===
Legend:
Regular panelist
Guest panelist

Apps		Panelists in attendance (Sorted by first appearance, with episode designations)
g#	p#	Panelists in attendance (Sorted by first appearance, with episode designations)
8	1	Rita Baga (1, 4–5, 6–7, 9–10; sp. 1)
2	1	Annie Villeneuve (7; sp. 1)
1	30	Matt Lang and Mitsou (sp. 1); Yannick De Martino and Mariana Mazza (1); Stéphane Fallu, Kim Rusk, and Martin Vachon (2); Cathy Gauthier, Arnaud Soly, and Marianne St. Gelais (3); Marie-Soleil Dion and Pierre-Yves Roy-Desmarais (4); Éléonore Lagacé and Rémi-Pierre Paquin (5); Bruno Blanchet, Ève Côté, and Dany Turcotte (sp. 2); Guylaine Guay and P-A Méthot (6); Antoine Vézina (7); Pierre Hébert, Philippe Laprise, and Debbie Lynch-White (8); Anaïs Favron and Guillaume Pineault (9); Catherine Brunet and Jean-Thomas Jubin (10); Alex Perron, Julie Snyder, and Julie St. Pierre (sp. 3)
