= La Voix season 10 =

La Voix
- Season 10
- Hosted by: Charles Lafortune
- Coaches: Corneille; Roxane Bruneau; France D'Amour; Mario Pelchat
- Winner: Maude Cyr-Deschênes
- Winning coach: France D'Amour
- Runner-up: Redge Olibrice

Release
- Original network: TVA
- Original release: 21 January – 7 April 2024

Season chronology
- Next → Season 11

Season 10 of La Voix broadcast from 21 January 2024 to 7 April 2024 on TVA. Among last season's coaches, Corneille and Mario Pelchat returned for their second season as coaches, while Roxane Bruneau and France D'Amour replaced Marc Dupré and Marjo.

Charles Lafortune returned for his tenth season as host.

On 7 April, Maude Cyr-Deschênes from Team France was announced as the winner of the season, marking France D'Amour's first win as a coach.

== Coaches and host ==
In July 2023, it was revealed that Corneille and Mario Pelchat would return as coaches from the ninth season. Roxane Bruneau, who served as a coach on La deuxième voix in the ninth season, joined the panel as a main coach this season, replacing Marc Dupré. Additionally, debutant France D'Amour joined the panel, replacing Marjo.

Coaches and host of La Voix season 10

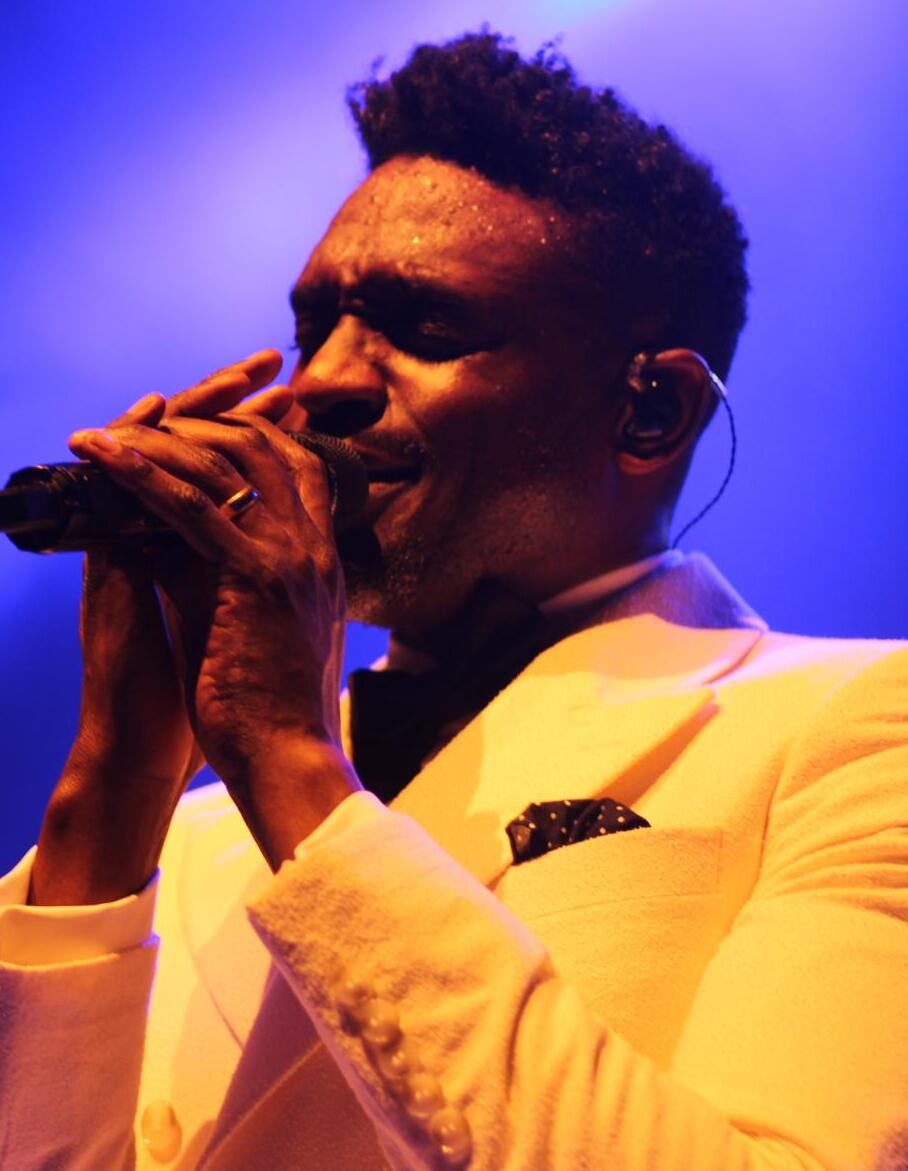
Corneille

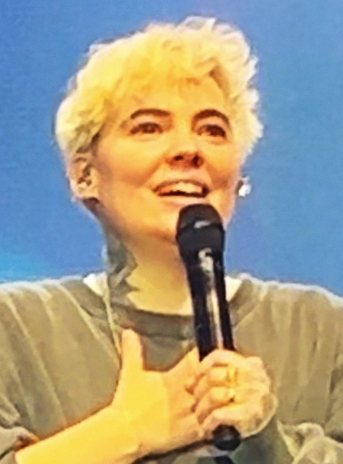
Roxane Bruneau

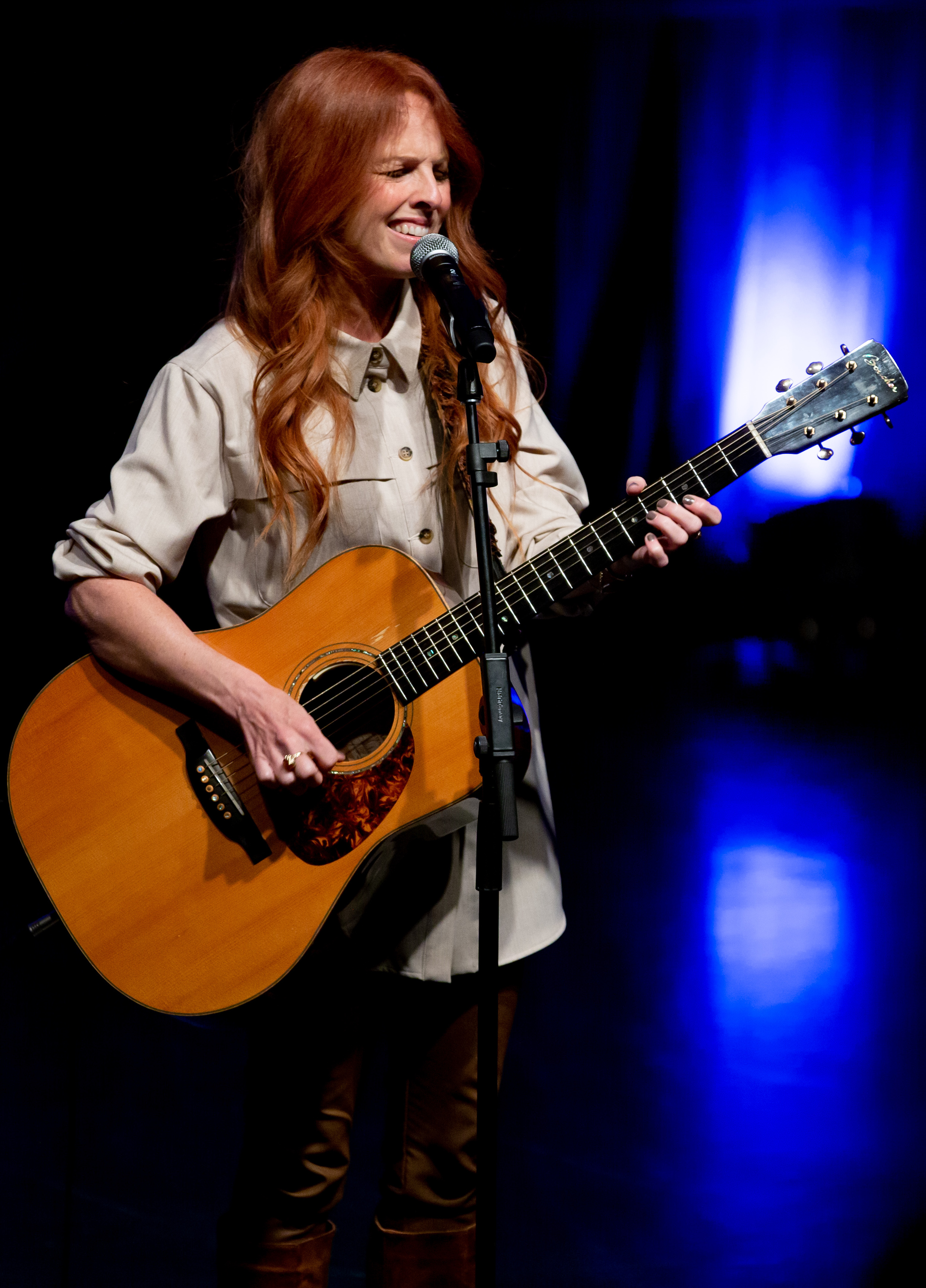
France D'Amour

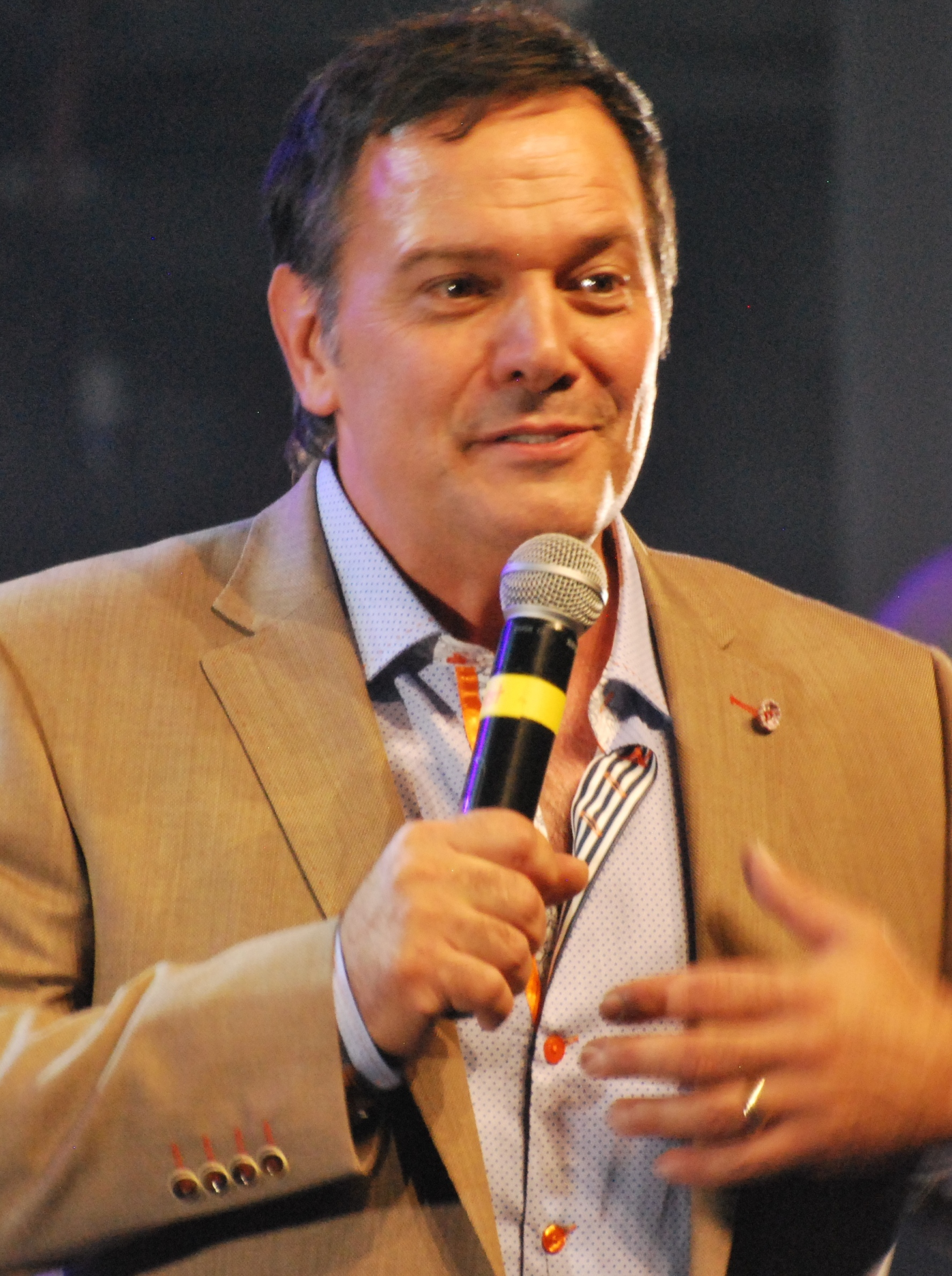
Mario Pelchat

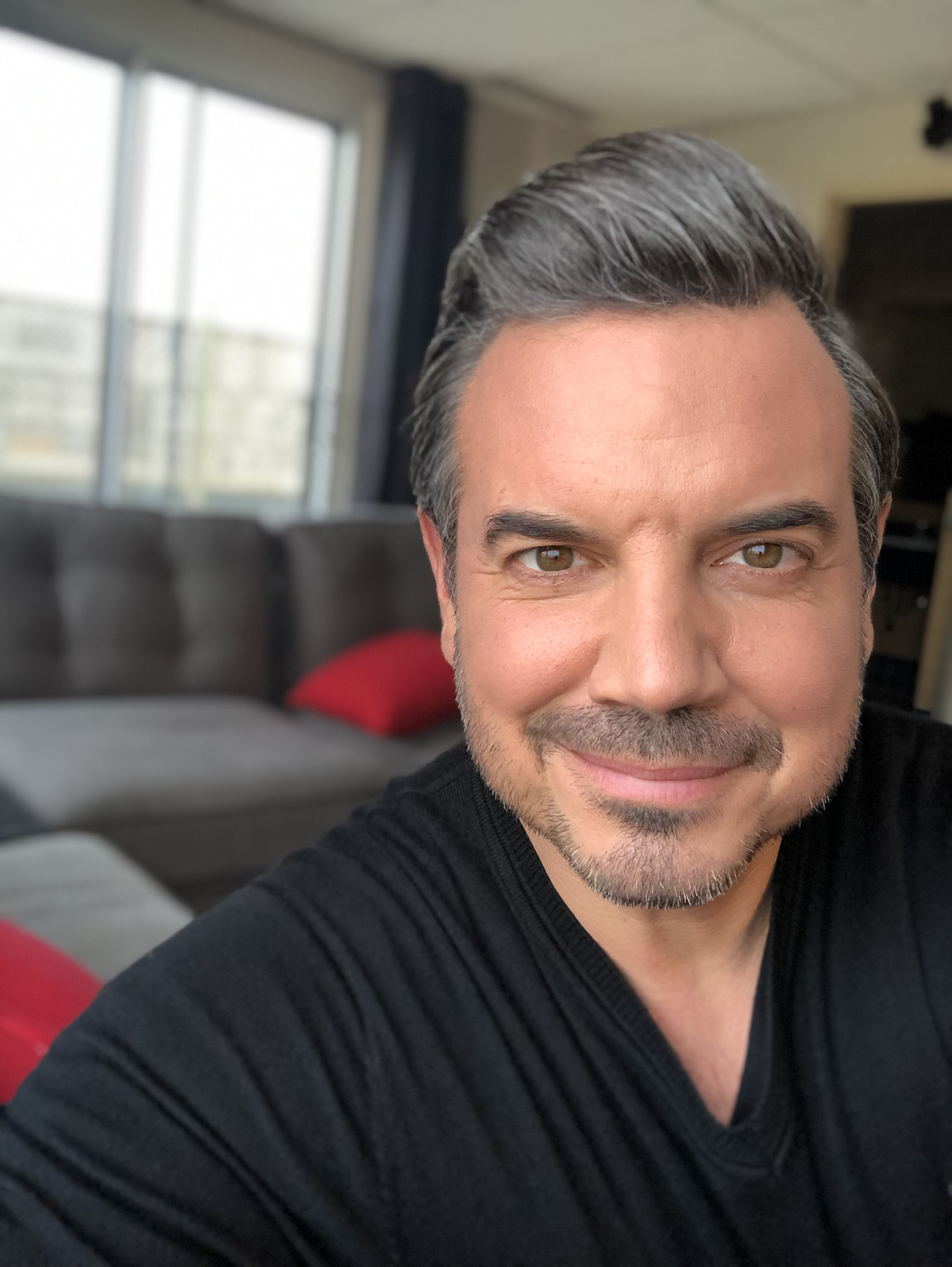
Charles Lafortune

== Teams ==
Each coach had 10 spots to fill in the Blind Auditions. Additionally, each coach can "steal" another artist in the Battles from another team, adding the artist to his/her team.

Color key

- Winner
- Runner-up
- Third place
- Fourth place
- Eliminated in the Semi final
- Eliminated in the Qualifications
- Stolen in the Battle rounds
- Eliminated in the Battle rounds

Coaches	Top 40 artists			
Corneille				
Corneille	Redge Olibrice	Leticia Jiménez	Anaïs Goulet	Wissem
Corneille	Bryan Alexandre-Melo	Jana Salameh	~~Norah Lapointe~~	~~Lee-Anne Bergevin~~
Corneille	~~Charles Goelen~~	Marie-Louise Déziel	Joey Boughanem	
Roxane Bruneau				
Roxane Bruneau	Jonathan Houde	Chadé Losane	Norah Lapointe	Isabelle Morin
Roxane Bruneau	Andrew	Rosemarie Gauthier	~~Redge Olibrice~~	Anik St-Pierre
Roxane Bruneau	Mylène Vallée	Jacob St-Cyr Labbé	Audrey Faucon	
France D'Amour				
France D'Amour	Maude Cyr-Deschênes	Lee-Anne Bergevin	Guillaume Lessard	Ally Neah
France D'Amour	Ange-Élie Ménard	Alexis Bouchard-Leblond	Roberto Scienza	Emmanuel Hue
France D'Amour	Émilie D'Amour	Caroline Allatt	Simon McGrath	
Mario Pelchat				
Mario Pelchat	Priscilla Findlay	William Osias	Charles Goelen	Camille Schlybert
Mario Pelchat	Dan Daraîche	Katy Vachon	Sara-Ève Proulx	Gabriel Fredette
Mario Pelchat	Charlotte Tourigny	Cathy Vallières	Dominique Séguin	
Note: Italicized names are stolen artists (names struck through within former teams).

== Blind auditions ==
In the blind auditions, each artist sings a song to four coaches who have their chairs turned away from the artist. If a coach is interested in working with an artist, he/she will press the "Je te veux" button and will then face the artist. If only one coach turns, the artist defaults to that team. If more than one coach turns, the artist chooses his/her coach. This season features the Block, which each coach can use twice to prevent one of the other coaches from getting a contestant. At the end of the blind auditions, France D'Amour did not use her second Block.

✔️	Coach pressed the "Je te veux" button
	Artist chose this coach's team
	Artist defaulted to the coach's team
	Artist received no turns and was eliminated
✘	Coach pressed the "Je te veux" button, but was blocked by Corneille from getting the artist
✘	Coach pressed the "Je te veux" button, but was blocked by Roxane from getting the artist
✘	Coach pressed the "Je te veux" button, but was blocked by France from getting the artist
✘	Coach pressed the "Je te veux" button, but was blocked by Mario from getting the artist

=== Episode 1 (21 January) ===
Order	Artist	Age	Hometown	Song	Coach's and artist's choices			
Order	Artist	Age	Hometown	Song	Corneille	Roxane	France	Mario
1	Anik St-Pierre	51	Shawinigan	"River Deep, Mountain High"	✔	✔	✔	✔
2	Caroline Allatt	37	Rawdon	"Kraft Dinner"	✔	—	✔	—
3	Wissem	27	Lyon	"Trop beau"	✔	✔	✔	✔
4	Antoine Naoum	62	Saint-Laurent	"Buenas noches mi amor"	—	—	—	—
5	Guillaume Lessard	24	Laval	"A Touch of Evil"	✔	✔	✔	✔
6	Charles-Hugo Martineau	32	Québec	"Giving You Up"	—	—	—	—
7	Priscilla Findlay	30	Montreal	"I Love the Lord"	✔	✔	✔	✔
8	Jonathan Houde	23	Thetford Mines	"When I Was Your Man"	✘	✔	✔	✔
9	Kelliane Béland	21	Saint-Boniface	"Hier encore"	—	—	—	—
10	Charles Kardos	20	Longueuil	"That's Life"	—	—	—	—
11	Maude Cyr-Deschênes	24	Edmundston	"Le dernier jour du disco"	—	✔	✔	—
12	Norah Lapointe	19	McMasterville	"Rien ne sert de courir"	✔	✔	✔	✔

=== Episode 2 (28 January) ===
Order	Artist	Age	Hometown	Song	Coach's and artist's choices			
Order	Artist	Age	Hometown	Song	Corneille	Roxane	France	Mario
1	Marie-Ève Tremblay	43	Kanata	"It's Oh So Quiet"	—	—	—	—
2	Ange-Élie Ménard	17	Kanata	"Et Bam"	✔	✘	✔	✔
3	Jana Salameh	22	Ottawa	"Coupable"	✔	—	✔	—
4	Loïc Lafrance	22	Québec	"Rebound"	—	—	—	—
5	Audrey Faucon	17	Hammond	"Traitor"	✔	✔	—	—
6	Alain Peddie	52	Baie-du-Febvre	"Artistes"	—	—	—	—
7	Sara-Ève Proulx	22	Mascouche	"Imaginer l'amour"	—	✔	—	✔
8	Joey Boughanem	24	Blainville	"Valerie"	✔	✘	✘	✔
9	Thalia Rosaura	23	Montreal	"La folie en quatre"	—	—	—	—
10	Isabelle Morin	37	Saint-Sulpice	"Redneck Woman"	—	✔	—	—
11	Léo Rafael	46	Campbellton	"Les moulins de mon cœur"	—	—	—	—
12	Dan Daraîche	31	Terrebonne	"Quand j'ai besoin"	✔	✔	✔	✔
13	Katy Vachon	43	Rouyn-Noranda	"(You Make Me Feel Like) A Natural Woman"	—	✔	✘	✔

=== Episode 3 (4 February) ===
Order	Artist	Age	Hometown	Song	Coach's and artist's choices			
Order	Artist	Age	Hometown	Song	Corneille	Roxane	France	Mario
1	Simon McGrath	32	Québec	"Leave a Light On"	—	—	✔	✔
2	Ève Dessureault	31	Saint-Bruno-de-Montarville	"Climb Ev'ry Mountain"	—	—	—	—
3	Lee-Anne Bergevin	26	Montreal	"I'm Outta Love"	✔	—	—	—
4	Kaï Castiel-Roy	15	Blainville	"Vampire"	—	—	—	—
5	Alexis Bouchard-Leblond	23	Québec	"Simple Man"	✔	✔	✔	✔
6	Eadsé	33	Montreal	"Moi, Elsie"	—	—	—	—
7	Ally Neah	24	Montreal	"Les trottoirs du boulevard Saint-Laurent"	✔	—	✔	✔
8	Claudia Tessier	22	Gatineau	"Rescue"	—	—	—	—
9	Bryan Alexandre-Melo	20	Laval	"Lay Me Down"	✔	✔	✔	✔
10	Marie-Josée Cyr	63	Saint-Bruno-de-Montarville	"I Hate You Then I Love You"	—	—	—	—
11	Camille Schlybert	19	Prévost	"Part of Your World"	—	—	—	✔
12	Chadé Losane	27	Québec	"On était beau"	—	✔	—	✔
13	Redge Olibrice	28	Montreal	"Bella"	✔	✔	✔	✔

=== Episode 4 (11 February) ===
Order	Artist	Age	Hometown	Song	Coach's and artist's choices			
Order	Artist	Age	Hometown	Song	Corneille	Roxane	France	Mario
1	Gabriel Fredette	22	Saint-Hyacinthe	"not my job anymore"	✔	✔	✔	✔
2	Marie-Louise Déziel	27	Montreal	"Since I Left You"	✔	✔	✔	—
3	Noëlly L. Nsimba	28	Montreal	"La Vie en rose"	—	—	—	—
4	David & Mikä	39 & 40	Montreal	"I Lost My Baby"	—	—	—	—
5	Charlotte Tourigny	29	Montreal	"A Song for You"	—	—	✔	✔
6	Mylène Vallée	31	Les Méchins	"Take Me Home, Country Roads"	—	✔	—	—
7	Addison Rancoude	33	Île Maurice	"Catch & Release"	—	—	—	—
8	Josée Lapierre	50	Les Îles-de-la-Madeleine	"Ce que le blues a fait de moi"	—	—	—	—
9	Jacob St-Cyr Labbé	30	Saint-Jean-sur-Richelieu	"Something in the Orange"	—	✔	✔	—
10	Dominique Séguin	44	Montreal	"Hymne à l'amour"	—	—	—	✔
11	Loïc Trépanier	23	Val-d'Or	"La voix que j'ai"	—	—	—	—
12	Roberto Scienza	31	Brazil	"Death Letter"	—	—	✔	✔
13	Charles Goelen	26	Longueuil	"À fleur de toi"	✔	✔	✔	✔

=== Episode 5 (18 February) ===
Order	Artist	Age	Hometown	Song	Coach's and artist's choices			
Order	Artist	Age	Hometown	Song	Corneille	Roxane	France	Mario
1	Andrew	24	Saguenay	"De la main gauche"	✘	✔	—	✔
2	Samantha Charbonneau-Vaudeville	23	Mirabel	"Ton histoire"	—	—	—	—
3	Anaïs Goulet	18	Drummondville	"Avant elle"	✔	✔	—	✔
4	Simon Harnois	24	Alma	"Lili"	—	—	—	—
5	Émilie D'Amour	30	Laval	"Ta main"	—	—	✔	—
6	Kassandra Montpetit	22	Terrebonne	"Un peu plus haut, un peu plus loin"	—	—	—	—
7	Leticia Jiménez	19	Montreal	"Histoire d'un amour"	✔	✔	✔	✘
8	William Osias	25	Montreal	"Le géant de papier"	Team full	—	—	✔
9	Emmanuel Hue	36	Montreal	"1, 2 Many"	Team full	✔	✔	—
10	Jo Hell	45	Montreal	"Who Do You Love?"	Team full	—	Team full	—
11	Jayleen	40	Lachine	"Good Woman"	Team full	—	Team full	—
12	Mikis Robert	28	Gatineau	"Old Time Rock and Roll"	Team full	—	Team full	—
13	Charles Robert	36	Montreal	"La saison des pluies"	Team full	—	Team full	—
14	Rosemarie Gauthier	25	Lévis	"Ce soir l'amour est dans tes yeux"	Team full	✔	Team full	✔
15	Cathy Vallières	43	Sainte-Adèle	"It Hurt So Bad"	Team full	Team full	Team full	✔

== Battles ==
In the battles, each coach pairs two of their artist together to perform a duet. The winner of each battle moves on to the Qualifications. Coaches are then given an opportunity to "steal" the loser if that artist is not on their team. Each coach has one "steal" to keep a loser in the competition and add them to their team, taking them to the next round. Artists who lose the battle and do not receive a "steal" are eliminated from the competition.

At the end of the round, each coach had five of their original artists and one stolen artist move on to the Qualifications. Roxane, France, and Mario all used their steal on an artist from Team Corneille, while Corneille used his steal on an artist from Team Roxane.

Colour key:

Artist won the Battle and advanced to the Qualifications
Artist lost the Battle but was stolen by another coach and advanced to the Qualifications
Artist lost the Battle and was eliminated

Episode	Coach	Order	Winner	Song	Loser	'Steal' result			
Episode	Coach	Order	Winner	Song	Loser	Corneille	Roxane	France	Mario
Episode 6 (25 February)	Mario Pelchat	1	William Osias	"Les yeux de la mama"	Dominique Séguin	—	—	—	—N/a
Episode 6 (25 February)	France D'Amour	2	Ange-Élie Ménard	"Je pense encore à toi"	Simon McGrath	—	—	—N/a	—
Episode 6 (25 February)	Roxane Bruneau	3	Jonathan Houde	"Minefields"	Audrey Faucon	—	—N/a	—	—
Episode 6 (25 February)	Corneille	4	Anaïs Goulet	"Aimer d'amour"	Lee-Anne Bergevin	—N/a	—	✔	—
Episode 6 (25 February)	Mario Pelchat	5	Dan Daraîche	"It's Only Love"	Cathy Vallières	—	—	Team full	—N/a
Episode 6 (25 February)	France D'Amour	6	Maude Cyr-Deschênes	"Strong Enough"	Caroline Allatt	—	—	Team full	—
Episode 7 (3 March)	France D'Amour	1	Ally Neah	"Pas gaie la pagaille"	Émilie D'Amour	—	—	Team full	—
Episode 7 (3 March)	Roxane Bruneau	2	Isabelle Morin	"Need You Now"	Jacob St-Cyr Labbé	—	—N/a	Team full	—
Episode 7 (3 March)	Corneille	3	Bryan Alexandre-Melo	"On s'habitue"	Norah Lapointe	—N/a	✔	Team full	—
Episode 7 (3 March)	France D'Amour	4	Alexis Bouchard-Leblond	"Something to Talk About"	Emmanuel Hue	—	Team full	Team full	—
Episode 7 (3 March)	Roxane Bruneau	5	Chadé Losane	"Tenir debout"	Redge Olibrice	✔	Team full	Team full	✔
Episode 7 (3 March)	Corneille	6	Leticia Jiménez	"Prends ma main"	Joey Boughanem	Team full	Team full	Team full	—
Episode 7 (3 March)	Mario Pelchat	7	Priscilla Findlay	"His Eye Is on the Sparrow"	Charlotte Tourigny	Team full	Team full	Team full	—N/a
Episode 8 (10 March)	Corneille	1	Wissem	"Un jour je marierai un ange"	Charles Goelen	Team full	Team full	Team full	✔
Episode 8 (10 March)	Mario Pelchat	2	Camille Schlybert	"Always"	Gabriel Fredette	Team full	Team full	Team full	Team full
Episode 8 (10 March)	Roxane Bruneau	3	Rosemarie Gauthier	"Le bureau du médecin"	Mylène Vallée	Team full	Team full	Team full	Team full
Episode 8 (10 March)	France D'Amour	4	Guillaume Lessard	"Chasse-Galerie"	Roberto Scienza	Team full	Team full	Team full	Team full
Episode 8 (10 March)	Corneille	5	Jana Salameh	"Premier amour"	Marie-Louise Déziel	Team full	Team full	Team full	Team full
Episode 8 (10 March)	Mario Pelchat	6	Katy Vachon	"La Neige au Sahara"	Sara-Ève Proulx	Team full	Team full	Team full	Team full
Episode 8 (10 March)	Roxane Bruneau	7	Andrew	"Tous les cris les S.O.S."	Anik St-Pierre	Team full	Team full	Team full	Team full

== Qualifications ==
The Qualifications aired on 17 March and 24 March. In this round, each episode, all four coaches had three of their artists sing for a spot in the semi-final. One artist per team each episode moved on, while the other two were eliminated.

Colour key:

Artist was saved and moved on to the semi-final
Artist was eliminated

=== Episode 9 (17 March) ===
Order	Coach	Artist	Song
1	France D'Amour	Maude Cyr-Deschênes	"Holding Out for a Hero"
2	France D'Amour	Ange-Élie Ménard	"L'effet de masse"
3	France D'Amour	Alexis Bouchard-Leblond	"I Won't Give Up"
4	Mario Pelchat	Dan Daraîche	"Mes blues passent pu dans porte"
5	Mario Pelchat	Priscilla Findlay	"J'm'en veux"
6	Mario Pelchat	Katy Vachon	"Une femme avec toi"
7	Corneille	Leticia Jiménez	"Como la flor"
8	Corneille	Bryan Alexandre-Melo	"Mourir auprès de mon amour"
9	Corneille	Jana Salameh	"Je t'aime"
10	Roxane Bruneau	Andrew	"Oxygène"
11	Roxane Bruneau	Rosemarie Gauthier	"Torn"
12	Roxane Bruneau	Jonathan Houde	"Someone You Loved"

=== Episode 10 (24 March) ===
Order	Coach	Artist	Song
1	Mario Pelchat	William Osias	"Let's Get It On"
2	Mario Pelchat	Charles Goelen	"Bang Bang (My Baby Shot Me Down)"
3	Mario Pelchat	Camille Schlybert	"Because of You"
4	Corneille	Wissem	"Quelqu'un m'a dit"
5	Corneille	Anaïs Goulet	"Doudou"
6	Corneille	Redge Olibrice	"La rose et l'armure"
7	Roxane Bruneau	Chadé Losane	"Another Love"
8	Roxane Bruneau	Isabelle Morin	"Feel Happy"
9	Roxane Bruneau	Norah Lapointe	"Repartir à zéro"
10	France D'Amour	Guillaume Lessard	"I'd Do Anything for Love (But I Won't Do That)"
11	France D'Amour	Ally Neah	"Danse avec moi"
12	France D'Amour	Lee-Anne Bergevin	"Mamma Knows Best"

== Semi-final ==
The semi-final aired on 31 March. In this stage, the remaining Top 8 artists, two from each team, performed "cross-battles." On "challenger" coach pitted one of their artists against an artist from another coach's team. The winner was decided through the audience vote. This season was the first to feature this change in La Voix history. Due to this adjustment in format, it was not guaranteed that each coach would have an artist representing them in the final.

Coaches Corneille, Roxane Bruneau, and France D'Amour all managed to bring their teams to the final with the advancements of Redge Olibrice, Jonathan Houde, and Maude Cyr-Deschênes and Lee-Anne Bergevin, respectively. With the advancements of Maude Cyr-Deschênes and Lee-Anne Bergevin, France D'Amour became the first coach in La Voix history to bring two of their artists to the finale. Additionally, with the eliminations of Priscilla Findlay and William Osias, Mario Pelchat no longer had any artists on his team, marking the first occurrence in La Voix history that a coach was not represented in the final.

=== Episode 11 (31 March) ===
Semi-final results
Order	Challenger				Challenged			
Order	Coach	Song	Artist	%	%	Artist	Song	Coach
1	Mario Pelchat	"À coup de rêves"	William Osias	37%	63%	Redge Olibrice	"Le ciel est Back Order"	Corneille
2	Corneille	"Et cetera"	Leticia Jiménez	6%	94%	Lee-Anne Bergevin	"We Are the Champions"	France D'Amour
3	France D'Amour	"Ordinaire"	Maude Cyr-Deschênes	77%	23%	Chadé Losane	"Mon ange"	Roxane Bruneau
4	Roxane Bruneau	"Comment je te dirais"	Jonathan Houde	50.5%	49.5%	Priscilla Findlay	"Hero"	Mario Pelchat

== Final ==
The final aired on 7 April. Each of the remaining four artists sang to earn the highest amount of percentage points, thus being crowned La Voix. At the end of the round, Maude Cyr-Deschênes from Team France received the most votes and was crowned the winner of La Voix.

=== Round 1 ===
Colour Key:

The contestant is through to Round 2
The contestant is eliminated

Order	Coach	Contestant	Song	Percentage of votes
1	France D'Amour	Lee-Anne Bergevin	"Regarde-moi"	18
2	France D'Amour	Maude Cyr-Deschênes	"Qu'est-ce que ça peut ben faire"	24
3	Roxane Bruneau	Jonathan Houde	"Parle-moi"	16
4	Corneille	Redge Olibrice	"L'Enfer"	42

=== Round 2 ===
Winner
Runner-up

Order	Coach	Contestant	Song	Percentage of votes
1	France D'Amour	Maude Cyr-Deschênes	"Quand on n'a que l'amour"	58
2	Corneille	Redge Olibrice	"Toujours vivant"	42
