= Qui sait chanter? season 1 =

Television game show season

Qui sait chanter?
- Season 1
- Starring: Roxane Bruneau; Rita Baga
- Hosted by: Phil Roy
- Winners: Good singers: 9; Bad singers: 4
- No. of episodes: 13

Release
- Original network: Noovo
- Original release: 13 September – 13 December 2021

Season chronology
- Next → Season 2

The first season of the Canadian French-language television mystery music game show Qui sait chanter? premiered on Noovo on 13 September 2021.

== Gameplay ==
=== Format ===
According to the original South Korean rules, the guest artist and contestant must attempt to eliminate bad singers during its game phase. At the final performance, the last remaining mystery singer is revealed as either good or bad by means of a duet between them and one of the guest artists.

The contestant must eliminate one mystery singer at the end of each round, receiving CA$3,000 if they eliminate a bad singer. At the end of a game, if the contestant decides to walk away, they will keep the money had won in previous rounds; if they decide to risk for the last remaining mystery singer, they win CA$25,000 if a singer is good, or lose their all winnings if a singer is bad.

=== Rounds ===
1. Playback (French: Relecture)
  Six mystery singers are divided into two groups of trios, and each of them would have to perform lip sync individually.
2. Access code (French: Code d'accès)
  The guest artist and contestant are presented with a video package containing possible clues by one of the mystery singers.
3. Secret studio (French: Studio secret)
  The guest artist and contestant are presented with video from a recording session by one of the mystery singers, but pitch-shifted to obscure their actual vocals.
4. Interrogation (French: Interrogatoire)
  The guest artist and contestant may ask questions to the remaining mystery singers. Good singers are required to give truthful responses, while the bad singers must lie.

== Episodes ==
=== Guest artists ===
Legend:
Good singer
Bad singer
— The contestant chose to risk the money.
— The contestant chose to walk away with the money.

Episode		Guest artist (Note: Players' notes: For the returning guest artists (who also include foreigners and former good singers), names are displayed in italics.; For the mixed groups, names who identified as bad singers are displayed in italics.)	Contestant	Mystery singers (In their respective numbers and aliases)					
#	Date	Guest artist	Contestant	Elimination order					Winner
#	Date	Guest artist	Contestant	Lip sync		Access code	Secret studio	Interrogation	Winner
1	13 September 2021	Annie Villeneuve	Mounya Iklid → $9,000	2. Bertholiny Fils-Aimé; (Boxer)	4. Jérémie Brassard; (Wine Waiter)	1. Olivia LeClerc; (Barmaid)	6. Evelyne Desrochers; (Extreme Sports Athlete)	3. Soulyne Michel; (Nun)	5. Marie-Ève Sauvé; Cheerleader
2	27 September 2021	Marie-Mai	Marc-André Rioux → $25,000	2. Catherine Servedio; (Broker)	6. Mathieu-Philippe Perras; (Waiter)	1. Héloise Binette; (Clown)	3. Sara Karel Chiasson; (Figure Skater)	4. Widmayer Edouard; (Basketball Player)	5. Mélodie-Jade Valiquette-Claude; Acupuncturist
3	4 October 2021	Corneille	Robine-Claudia Joseph → $12,000	3. Arthur Bussières Gallant; (Supermarket Clerk)	4. Simon Gosselin; (Mascot)	6. Erika Suaréz; (Softball Player)	1. Jordan Jacquet; (Stuntman)	5. Martin Bèdard; (Butler)	2. Frédérique Cyr-Deschênes; Runner
4	11 October 2021	Claude Cobra (Bleu Jeans Bleu)	Éliane Morin-Côté → $25,000	2. Jonathan Voisine; (Dance Instructor)	4. June Charles; (Stewardess)	1. Charles Édouard-Sanon; (Gogo Boy)	3. Jacob McDuff; (Firefighter)	6. Elysabeth Rivest; (Archer)	5. Véronique Laberge; Herbalist
5	18 October 2021	2Frères	Mickaël Grondin → $25,000	2. Vanessa Kneale; (Aerobics Teacher)	6. Yan Beauregard; (Nurse)	5. Zachary Abraham; (Cyclist)	1. Véronique Beaudoin; (Scuba Diver)	4. Täbi Yösha; (Fortune Teller)	3. Mary-Pier Guilbault; Circus Performer
6	25 October 2021	Martine St. Clair	Johanne Belot → $0	2. Alex Simpson; (Real Estate Broker)	6. Sébastien Gagné; (Magician)	4. Arti Sadhwani; (Photographer)	1. Pamela Boyer; (Table Tennis Player)	5. Koraly Lauzon; (Speed Skater)	3. Alexandra Claude; Poet
7	1 November 2021	Ludovick Bourgeois	Alexandra Gauthier → $25,000	1. Mamselle Ruiz; (Wader)	6. Frédérick Sylvestre; (Rainbow Drag)	2. Karen Alforque; (Chemist)	4. Jean-Christophe Pilon; (Golfer)	3. Rose Mills; (Jockey)	5. Peter Myles; Cop
8	8 November 2021	Brigitte Boisjoli	Robert Applyrs → $3,000	2. Yanick Petit; (Salesman)	6. Julie Le Tallec; (Skier)	3. Miguel Perreault; (Yogi)	4. Miranda Tremblay-Girard; (Hip-hop Dancer)	5. Jade Lapratte; (Lifeguard)	1. Louis-Philippe Desjardins; Medieval Elf
9	15 November 2021	Damien Robitaille	Stéphanie Caron → $25,000	1. Victoria Willard; (Proposed Benefits)	4. Michael Ramdin; (Computer Scientist)	6. Jérémy Provencher; (Teacher)	3. Magali Roche; (Athletics Champion)	5. Marie-Michèle Pharand; (Acrobat)	2. Christine Dubois; Birdwatcher
10	22 November 2021	Alicia Moffet	Exaucé Luyengi → $25,000	2. Fatoumata Traore; (Reporter)	4. Paolo Perfección; (Make-up Artist)	3. Marie Cournoyer; (Crossfit Girl)	5. Alexandre Gemme; (Drag Queen Country)	1. Émilie Landry; (Children's Party Princess)	6. Christopher Therrien; Massage Therapist
11	29 November 2021	Guylaine Tanguay	Marie-Claude Audet → $3,000	3. Letitia Sherry; (Miss Kitty)	4. Andy the Frenchy; (Gamer)	1. Justin Jackson; (Tap Dancer)	2. Richard-Nicolas Villeneuve; (Bowler)	6. Cathy Vallières; (Windsurfer)	5. Serge Rochon; Poker Champion
12	6 December 2021	Roxane Bruneau	Marc-André Savard → $25,000	1. Marie-Laurence Caux; (Influencer)	4. Martin-Alexis Gaytan-Ramirez; (Fashion Designer)	2. Melody Boutin; (Skateboarder)	3. Maude Larin-Kleran; (Adventurer)	6. Jean-François Carré; (Ice Hockey Player)	5. Carolane Closset; Dog Stroller
13	13 December 2021	Maxime Landry	Annie Fréchette → $25,000	2. Ibrahim Maalouf; (Trumpeter)	4. Jesyka Szopko; (Cabaret Diva)	1. Heaven-Leigh André; (Security Agent)	6. Alexandre LeBlanc; (Wrestler)	3. Alexia Gourd; (Yacht Crew)	5. Sissi-Catherine Michaud; Engineer

=== Panelists ===
Legend:
Regular panelist
Guest panelist

Apps		Panelists in attendance (Sorted by first appearance, with episode designations)
g#	p#	Panelists in attendance (Sorted by first appearance, with episode designations)
13	1	Rita Baga (1–13)
12	1	Roxane Bruneau (1–11, 13)
1	14	Jay Du Temple (1); Pierre-Yves Roy-Desmarais (2); Katherine Levac (3); Marie-Lyne Joncas (4); Félix-Antoine Tremblay (5); Benoît Gagnon (6); Arnaud Soly (7); Maxim Martin (8); France Castel (9); Christine Morency (10); Antoine Vézina (11); Véronique Claveau and Varda Étienne (12); Virginie Fortin (13)

== Reception ==
Legend:
Highest rated episode
Lowest rated episode

No.	Title	Air date	Timeslot (ET)	Placement		Viewership		Ref(s)
No.	Title	Air date	Timeslot (ET)	TS	EV	Rank	Total	Ref(s)
1	"Annie Villeneuve"	13 September 2021	Monday, 20:00	3	28	30	0.589	
2	"Marie-Mai"	27 September 2021	Monday, 20:00	Not reported				
3	"Corneille"	4 October 2021	Monday, 20:00	Not reported				
4	"Claude Cobra"	11 October 2021	Monday, 20:00	3	27	29	0.649	
5	"2Frères"	18 October 2021	Monday, 20:00	Not reported				
6	"Martine St. Clair"	25 October 2021	Monday, 20:00	Not reported				
7	"Ludovick Bourgeois"	1 November 2021	Monday, 20:00	Not reported				
8	"Brigitte Boisjoli"	8 November 2021	Monday, 20:00	Not reported				
9	"Damien Robitaille"	15 November 2021	Monday, 20:00	Not reported				
10	"Alicia Moffet"	22 November 2021	Monday, 20:00	Not reported				
11	"Guylaine Tanguay"	29 November 2021	Monday, 20:00	Not reported				
12	"Roxane Bruneau"	6 December 2021	Monday, 20:00	3	23	26	0.559	
13	"Maxime Landry"	13 December 2021	Monday, 20:00	1	13	15	0.614	

Source: Numeris
