= Athletics at the 2015 Summer Universiade – Women's 200 metres =

The women's 200 metres event at the 2015 Summer Universiade was held on 9 and 10 July at the Gwangju Universiade Main Stadium.

== Medalists ==
Gold	Silver	Bronze
Viktoriya Zyabkina; Kazakhstan	Shimayra Williams; United States	Kedisha Dallas; Jamaica

== Results ==
=== Heats ===
Qualification: First 3 in each heat (Q) and next 6 fastest (q) qualified for the semifinals.

Wind:
Heat 1: -2.4 m/s, Heat 2: -1.8 m/s, Heat 3: -0.8 m/s, Heat 4: -2.2 m/s, Heat 5: -0.1 m/s, Heat 6: -0.8 m/s

Rank	Heat	Name	Nationality	Time	Notes
1	6	Olga Kharitonova	Russia	23.61	Q
2	4	Akeyla Mitchell	United States	23.66	Q
3	1	Joëlle Golay	Switzerland	23.82	Q
4	5	Viktoriya Zyabkina	Kazakhstan	23.83	Q
5	6	Éva Kaptur	Hungary	23.84	Q, SB
6	6	Alexandra Bezeková	Slovakia	23.89	Q
7	3	Giulia Riva	Italy	23.99	Q
8	3	Hanne Claes	Belgium	23.99	Q
9	4	Kedisha Dallas	Jamaica	24.06	Q
9	6	Lin Huijun	China	24.06	q
11	1	Ashleigh Whittaker	Australia	24.10	Q
12	2	Shimayra Williams	Jamaica	24.18	Q
13	2	Udaya Ada	Liberia	24.28	Q
14	5	Farah Jacques	Canada	24.30	Q
15	1	Leah Walkeden	Canada	24.31	Q
16	2	Viola Kleiser	Austria	24.39	Q
17	4	Martina Schmidová	Czech Republic	24.41	Q
17	5	Ana Holland	United States	24.41	Q
19	2	Beatrice Gyaman	Ghana	24.43	q
20	1	Andreea Ogrăzeanu	Romania	24.45	q
20	3	Omolara Omotoso	Nigeria	24.45	Q
22	3	Anna Doi	Japan	24.57	q
23	5	Zhan Qingqing	China	24.66	q
24	3	Fatoumata Sacko	Mali	24.77	PB
24	4	Anne Dolvik	Norway	24.77	q
26	3	Germaine Abessolo Bivina	Cameroon	25.01	PB
27	5	Leonah Musikavanhu	Zimbabwe	25.35	
28	6	Gosego Mokokwe	Botswana	25.43	
29	2	Wanwisa Kongthong	Thailand	25.50	
30	2	Ontiretse Molapisi	Botswana	25.56	
31	3	Karmen Veerme	Estonia	25.63	
32	5	Shashika Vidanaduruge	Sri Lanka	26.16	
33	1	Lam Wing Tung Eunice	Hong Kong	26.98	
34	2	Lam On Ki	Hong Kong	27.23	
35	4	Chitoshi Musonda	Zambia	27.53	
36	1	Winta Yilma	Ethiopia	27.83	
37	6	Obanoyen Gbemisola	Nigeria	27.85	
38	2	Sabrina Bentara	Algeria	28.20	
39	5	Lory Tachjian	Lebanon	28.54	
40	1	Nice Antony Mathias	Tanzania	32.59	
	3	Maria Angeles Nzobeya	Equatorial Guinea	DNS	
	4	Aissa Issa Seyni	Niger	DNS	
	4	Mary Zawadi Unyuthfua	Uganda	DNS	

=== Semifinals ===
Qualification: First 2 in each heat (Q) and the next 2 fastest (q) qualified for the final.

Wind:
Heat 1: -1.3 m/s, Heat 2: -0.3 m/s, Heat 3: -0.7 m/s

Rank	Heat	Name	Nationality	Time	Notes
1	1	Viktoriya Zyabkina	Kazakhstan	23.28	Q
2	3	Akeyla Mitchell	United States	23.37	Q
3	1	Kedisha Dallas	Jamaica	23.56	Q
4	1	Joëlle Golay	Switzerland	23.57	q
5	2	Shimayra Williams	Jamaica	23.69	Q
6	2	Olga Kharitonova	Russia	23.78	Q
7	2	Farah Jacques	Canada	23.92	q
8	3	Hanne Claes	Belgium	23.94	Q
9	3	Giulia Riva	Italy	23.95	
10	2	Alexandra Bezeková	Slovakia	24.09	
11	1	Viola Kleiser	Austria	24.11	
11	2	Lin Huijun	China	24.11	
13	1	Ashleigh Whittaker	Australia	24.14	
14	2	Éva Kaptur	Hungary	24.16	
15	1	Martina Schmidová	Czech Republic	24.18	
16	3	Ana Holland	United States	24.29	
17	3	Leah Walkeden	Canada	24.34	
18	3	Beatrice Gyaman	Ghana	24.52	
19	3	Zhan Qingqing	China	24.57	
20	1	Anna Doi	Japan	24.64	
	1	Andreea Ogrăzeanu	Romania	DNF	
	2	Omolara Omotoso	Nigeria	DQ	R162.7
	2	Anne Dolvik	Norway	DNS	
	3	Udaya Ada	Liberia	DNS	

=== Final ===
Wind: -0.8 m/s

Official Video

Rank	Lane	Name	Nationality	Time	Notes
1st place, gold medalist(s)	3	Viktoriya Zyabkina	Kazakhstan	22.77	NR
2nd place, silver medalist(s)	6	Akeyla Mitchell	United States	22.95	PB
3rd place, bronze medalist(s)	5	Kedisha Dallas	Jamaica	23.24	PB
4	7	Olga Kharitonova	Russia	23.41	
5	4	Shimayra Williams	Jamaica	23.41	
6	1	Farah Jacques	Canada	23.58	
7	8	Hanne Claes	Belgium	23.75	
8	2	Joëlle Golay	Switzerland	23.85	
