= MP3 Disques =

- Founded: 2004
- Founder: Mario Pelchat
- Genre: French pop
- Country of origin: Canada
- Location: Montreal, Quebec
- Official website: mp3disques.com

MP3 Disques is a French pop music record label founded in 2004 in Montreal. The independent label was established by singer Mario Pelchat. The first album released by the label was Pelchat's own Noël avec Jireh Gospel Choir. The second release, in 2006, was again Pelchat's titled Le monde où je vais.

Over the years, MP3 Disques has released albums by Cindy Daniel, Ytheband, Nadja and Étienne Drapeau.

== Catalogue ==
- November 2004: Mario Pelchat - Noël avec Jireh Gospel Choir (AMPCD7894)
- March 2006: Mario Pelchat - Le monde où je vais (AMPCD7895)
- March 2006: Cindy Daniel - J'avoue (AMPCD7896)
- October 2006: Various Artists - Quand le country dit bonjour, volume 1 (AMPCD7897)
- May 2007: Various Artists - MexiCanciones (AMPCD7898)
- October 2007: Various Artists - Quand le country dit bonjour, volume 2 (AMPCD7899)
- August 2008: Cindy Daniel - Le tout premier jour (AMPCD7900)
- January 2009: Ytheband - What the city does to people (AMPCD7901)
- September 2009: Nadja - Nadja (AMPCD7902)
- September 2010: Étienne Drapeau - Paroles & Musique (AMPCD7903)
