= Étienne Drapeau =

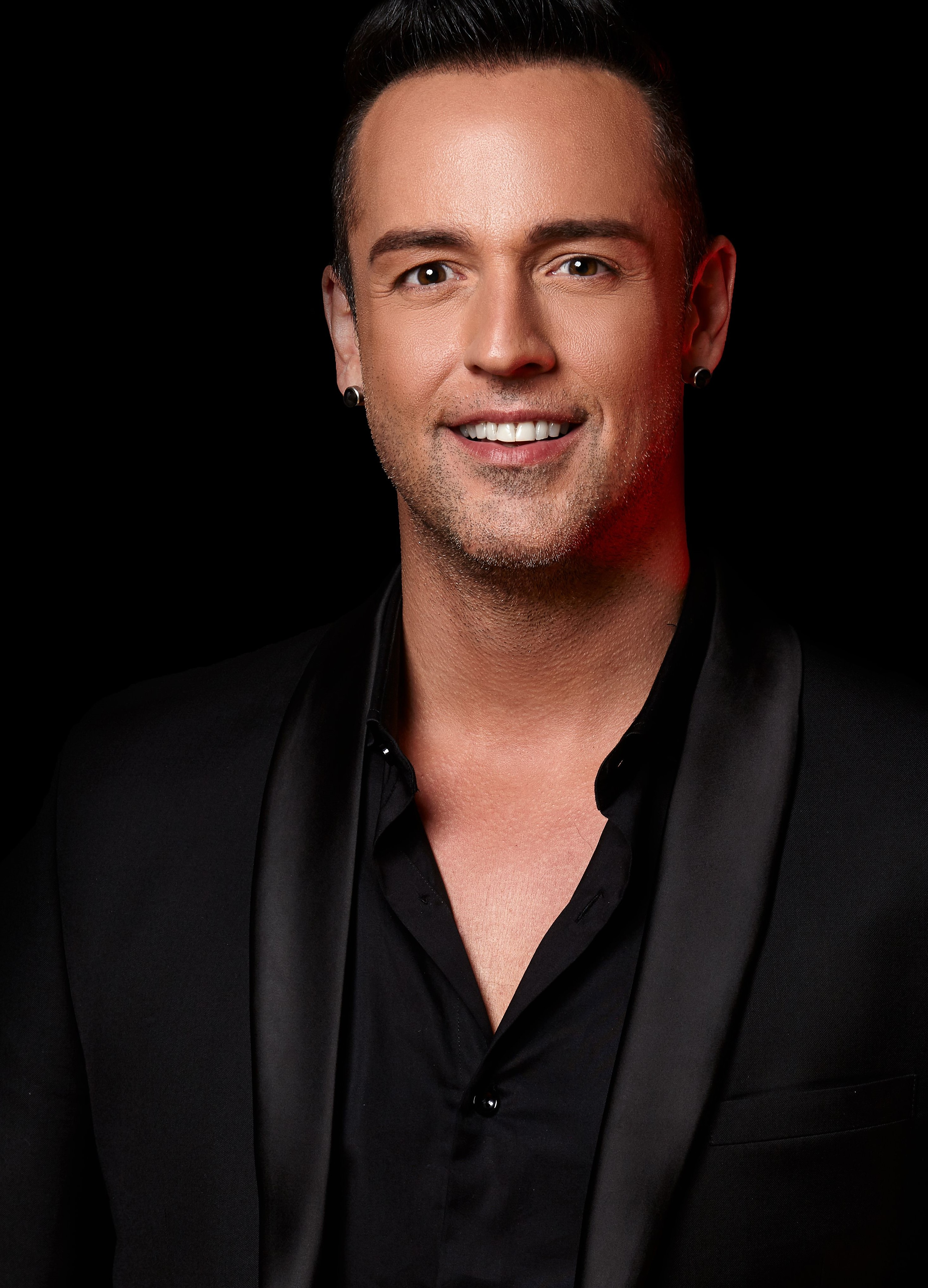
- Portrait of Étienne Drapeau
- Born: January 10, 1978 (age 48) Quebec City, Quebec, Canada
- Height: 6 ft 1 in (185 cm)
- Weight: 194 lb (88 kg; 13 st 12 lb)
- Position: Centre
- Shot: Left
- Played for: QMJHL; Halifax Mooseheads; Beauport Harfangs; Drummondville Voltigeurs; Victoriaville Tigres; ECHL; Johnstown Chiefs; Hampton Roads Admirals; AHL; Portland Pirates; UHL; Quad City Mallards; WCHL; Long Beach Ice Dogs; Tacoma Sabercats
- NHL draft: 99th overall, 1996; Montreal Canadiens
- Playing career: 1994–2002

Étienne Drapeau
- Born: January 10, 1978 (age 48); Quebec City, Quebec, Canada
- Genres: Pop
- Occupations: Singer, songwriter, record producer
- Instrument: Vocals
- Years active: 2003 – present
- Labels: Les Productions Drapeau; MP3 Disques
- Website: www.etiennedrapeau.ca

Étienne Drapeau (French pronunciation: [etjɛn dʁapo]; born January 10, 1978) is a Canadian former ice hockey player. He played as a centre in QMJHL, ECHL, AHL, UHL and WCHL leagues and was selected 99th overall by the Montreal Canadiens in the 4th round of the 1996 NHL entry draft.

After retiring, he became a musician, writing and composing his own music, and writing songs for other artists as well. He was among the top 10 finalists of the second season of the Quebec musical reality show Star Académie in 2004 and released three studio albums, Je l'ai jamais dit à personne (2007), Étienne Drapeau (2008) and Paroles & Musique (2010).

== Ice hockey ==
Season	Team	League	GP	G	A	Pts	PIM
1994–95	Halifax Mooseheads	QMJHL	63	26	35	61	121
1995–96	Halifax Mooseheads	QMJHL	42	10	25	35	98
1995–96	Beauport Harfangs	QMJHL	28	8	12	20	37
1996–97	Beauport Harfangs	QMJHL	46	15	30	45	42
1996–97	Drummondville Voltigeurs	QMJHL	21	10	15	25	42
1997–98	Drummondville Voltigeurs	QMJHL	32	18	19	37	30
1997–98	Victoriaville Tigres	QMJHL	30	14	30	44	43
1998–99	Johnstown Chiefs	ECHL	14	2	4	6	4
1998–99	Victoriaville Tigres	QMJHL	4	1	3	4	7
1999–00	Hampton Roads Admirals	ECHL	46	10	12	22	167
1999–00	Portland Pirates	AHL	10	0	0	0	45
2000–01	Quad City Mallards	UHL	61	13	13	26	205
2001–02	Long Beach Ice Dogs	WCHL	28	8	9	17	29
2001–02	Tacoma Sabercats	WCHL	38	10	9	19	42

== Star Académie ==
After singing in various musical venues, Étienne Drapeau took part in 2004 in reality television music competition Star Académie, broadcast on TVA. He was among the top 10 finalists of the second season.

He appeared in 2004 album Star Académie 2004 – Les meilleurs moments des finalistes aux galas containing various acts from the series, as well as in the album Star Académie 2004 by various artists. The latter sold more than 300,000 copies becoming triple platinum in Quebec.

== Musical career ==
After the show, he established his own record company "Les Productions Drapeau", toured in Quebec and New Brunswick with the tours "Étienne et ses invités" and "Rock & Soul", and in 2006 released his debut album Je l'ai jamais dit à personne. Produced by Toby Gendron in collaboration with Rick Haworth, it contained 11 songs written by Drapeau himself, with three co-written with Roger Tabra and "Il rêvait" with Lynda Lemay. Two music videos gained popularity from the album: "Je l'ai jamais dit à personne" and "Mens-moi encore". Another song also received airplay, namely "Écrire l'amour". His song "Je l'ai jamais dit à personne" was nominated for "Best Song of the Year" at the 2007 ADISQ gala.

In October 2008, Étienne Drapeau released his second studio album, self-titled Étienne Drapeau. Produced and accompanied by multi-instrumentalist Tino Izzo, Étienne Drapeau once again wrote most of the songs (both lyrics and music) and there are collaborations with Roger Tabra, Florence K, Ima, Stephan Moccio, Jean-François Breau, Sandrine Roy. Two songs from the album became hits for him, "Je t'aimerai" and "Comment battent les cœurs?". His cover of Cookie Dingler's "Femme libérée" also enjoyed wide play on Quebec radio stations. To promote the album, he made a tour in Quebec and appeared in Olympia in Paris in April 2009.

In Spring 2010, he split with Daniel Dubé and released his third album Paroles & Musique, meaning that the album was entirely his own composition. It was produced by Peter Ranallo, Guy St-Onge and Tino Izzo. The album was promoted through Mario Pelchat by MP3 Disques and was launched on September 21, 2010. Two songs from the album "Les femmes que j'ai aimées" and "T'es ma femme, t'es la plus belle" received wide radio airplay.

In 2013, Étienne Drapeau traveled to the Dominican Republic to film a music video for his song "J'suis amoureux". While there, he fell in love with the Dominican culture which prompted him to learn Spanish. 2 years later, the single "Eres mi reina" (Spanish version of "T'es ma femme, t'es la plus belle") was released. Unlike the original song, this version was written in the Bachata style and was even sent to Dominican Republican radio. On August 6, 2015, he became the headliner of the 7Th Annual Dc Bachata, Kizomba & World Latin Music Festival, in Washington where he performed "Eres Mi Reina" and Spanish versions of his other French hits.

On February 16, 2018, Étienne Drapeau released his first Spanish album (and sixth overall) "Fiesta", which contains Spanish versions of his French hits, translated by himself, as well as covers of popular Latin songs by Ricky Martin, Enrique Iglesias, Marc Anthony and Luis Fonsi. The promotion of the album begun at the "Cabaret Du Casino" in Montreal, 4 days after the album's release. During the show, he performed the songs from "Fiesta" and also other covers from Santana, Elvis Crespo, Shakira, and more.

=== Songwriting ===
Étienne Drapeau wrote "Quatre sangs" for the 400th Anniversary of Quebec celebrations interpreting the song himself. The song also appeared on the commemorative album for the event entitled Kebek par Québec containing works by various Quebec artists.

Étienne Drapeau has also written for other artists, most notably "Être femme" for Marie-Élaine Thibert that appeared in her EP Toi l'inoubliable (containing three songs). After its release in November 2010, it was certified gold.

== In popular culture ==
He has been a fervent advocate of the charity Opération Enfant Soleil in Quebec and sung live in their campaigns including "La Promesse" in 2009 and "À mon père et ma mère" in 2011. . He was also involved in charity work in a humanitarian mission for "Centre Ziat", Fès, Morocco reflected in his fourth album Le monde est beau.

== Discography ==
=== Albums ===
- 2007: Je l'ai jamais dit à personne (Les Productions Drapeau)
- 2008: Étienne Drapeau (Les Productions Drapeau)
- 2010: Paroles & Musique (MP3 Disques)
- 2012: Le monde est beau (Musicor)
- 2014: T'es toute ma vie (Musicor)
- 2018: Fiesta
- 2021: Le pont

=== Singles ===
- 2008: "Je l'ai jamais dit à personne"
- 2010: "Le bonheur"
- 2012: "Le monde est beau"

=== Appearances ===
- 2007: "Quand revient le printemps" on the collection album Quand le country dit bonjour Vol. 2 by MP3 Disques
- 2007: "Écrire l'amour" on the album Merci pour la chanson Vol. 4 alongside other artists on the 29th ADISQ gala
- 2008: "La guitare de Jérémie" in the album War Child Héros
- 2010: "Bien après nous" as duo with Carla on the album Si tu y crois
- 2010: "On va gagner" in the album La série Montréal-Québec

== Videography ==
- 2007: "Je l'ai jamais dit à personne"
- 2007: "Mens-moi encore"
- 2011: "T'es ma femme, t'es la plus belle"
- 2011: "Je t'aimerai"
- 2012: "Le monde est beau"
