= Toujours de nous =

Studio album by Mario Pelchat
- Released: October 19, 2010
- Genre: French pop, soft rock
- Label: Musicor; MQMCD2418

Mario Pelchat chronology
Mario Pelchat chante Michel Legrand (2009)	Toujours de nous (2010)	Agnus Dei (2017)

Toujours de nous (meaning Always from Us) is the twelfth studio album by Canadian singer Mario Pelchat. It was released on October 19, 2010 by Musicor.

== Track listing ==
No.	Title	Length
1.	"Toujours de nous"	3:56
2.	"Le sourire au coeur"	3:25
3.	"Je serai le même"	4:34
4.	"Je renonce à tout"	3:18
5.	"La dernière noce"	4:18
6.	"S'il le faut"	3:58
7.	"Mon retour"	4:07
8.	"Croire"	3:12
9.	"Le bonheur"	3:56
10.	"La plus belle histoire"	6:03
11.	"Sors"	3:36
12.	"Je partirai"	3:59
Total length:		48:21
