= Cindy Daniel =

Québécois singer

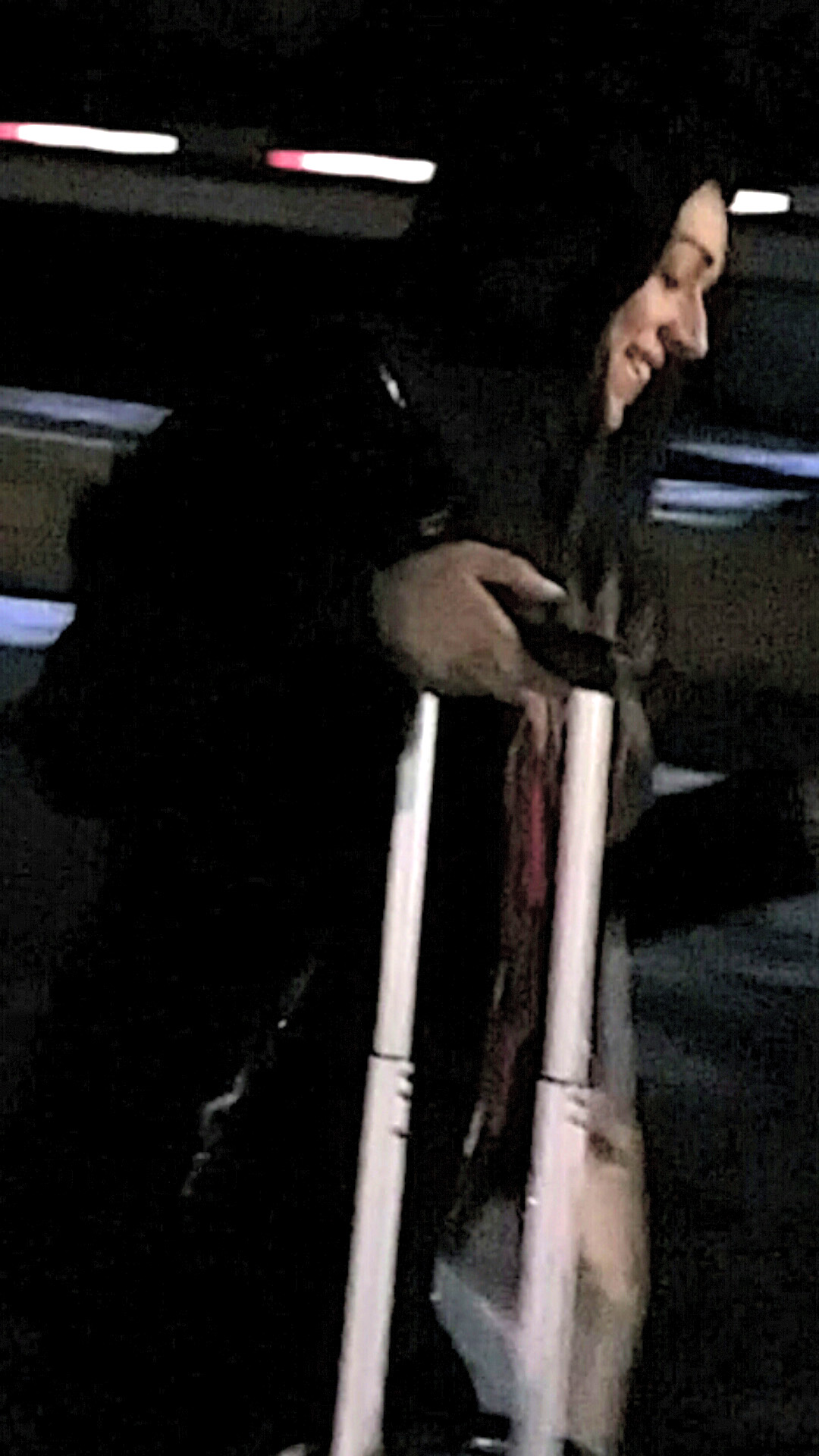
Cindy Daniel photographed in St. Eustache, Québec, Canada outside the theatre Le Zénith Promutuel assurance .

Cindy Daniel (born May 6, 1986 in Montreal, Quebec) is a Québécois singer and actress.

She released her first album, La petite indienne, in 2002. In 2003, she played the role of Elvira in the French Canadian musical version of Don Juan by Félix Gray.

Daniel has released two albums with the label MP3 Disques: J'avoue in 2006 and Le tout premier jour in 2008. Both were produced by Mario Pelchat, with whom Daniel would later collaborate with on the compilation album Entre nous... 10 ans déjà! in 2011. She was nominated for a Felix award nomination in ADISQ 2007.

== Discography ==
=== Albums ===
- 2002: La petite indienne
- 2006: J'avoue
- 2008: Le tout premier jour
- 2011: Entre nous... 10 ans déjà!
- 2022: Ma mère chantait toujours

=== Appearances ===
- 2003: Don Juan (album of musical, with various artists)

=== Singles ===
- 2002: "Si tu veux partir"
- 2006: "Sous une pluie d'étoiles"
- 2006: "Notre génération"
- 2007: "Une promesse"
- 2008: "Quand tu ne m'aimeras plus"
- 2010: "Dans le vent"
- 2011: "Entre nous"
- 2014: "Une fois pour de bon"
