= Qui sait chanter? =

Canadian French-language television game show

- Genre: Game show
- Based on: I Can See Your Voice by CJ ENM
- Directed by: Benoît Giguere
- Presented by: Phil Roy
- Starring: Roxane Bruneau (1); Rita Baga (1–2)
- Country of origin: Canada
- Original language: French
- No. of seasons: 2
- No. of episodes: Regular: 23; Special: 3; Overall: 26

Production
- Executive producer: Julie Snyder
- Producer: Marie-Pier Gaudreault
- Camera setup: Multi-camera
- Production companies: Productions J and ToRoS

Original release
- Network: Noovo
- Release: 13 September 2021 – 12 December 2022

Related
- I Can See Your Voice franchise

Qui sait chanter? (lit. 'Who can sing?') is a Canadian French-language television mystery music game show based on the South Korean program I Can See Your Voice, featuring its format where guest artist(s) and a contestant attempt to eliminate bad singers from the group, until the last mystery singer remains for a duet performance. It first aired on Noovo on 13 September 2021.

== Gameplay ==
=== Format ===
Over the course of several rounds, the guest artist and contestant must attempt to eliminate bad singers from a group of six "mystery singers", identified only by their occupation or alias, without ever hearing them perform live. They are assisted by clues regarding the singers' backgrounds, style of performance, and observations from a celebrity panel. At the end of a game, the last remaining mystery singer is revealed as either good or bad by means of a duet between them and one of the guest artists. (Note: Gameplay notes: The number of rounds are set to three (for the 2nd season) or four (for the 1st season).; As per eliminated bad singer, the contestant gets CA$3,000 (for the 1st season) or CA$4,000 (for the 2nd season).)

The contestant must eliminate one mystery singer at the end of each round, receiving a petty cash if they eliminate a bad singer. At the end of a game, if the contestant decides to walk away, they will keep the money had won in previous rounds; if they decide to risk for the last remaining mystery singer, they win CA$25,000 if a singer is good, or lose their all winnings if a singer is bad.

=== Rounds ===
==== Lip sync rounds ====
Each mystery singer performs a lip sync to a song; good singers mime to a recording of their own, while bad singers mime to a backing track by another vocalist.

- Playback (French: Relecture)
  - s1: Six mystery singers are divided into two groups of trios, and each of them would have to perform lip sync individually.
  - s2: Six mystery singers are divided into pairs, in which each compete a lip sync battle against each other.

==== Evidence round ====
- Access code (French: Code d'accès)

s1–2: The guest artist and contestant are presented with a video package containing possible clues by one of the mystery singers.

==== Rehearsal round ====
- Secret studio (French: Studio secret)

s1: The guest artist and contestant are presented with video from a recording session by one of the mystery singers, but pitch-shifted to obscure their actual vocals.

==== Interrogation round ====
- Interrogation (French: Interrogatoire)

s2: The guest artist and contestant may ask questions to the remaining mystery singers. Good singers are required to give truthful responses, while the bad singers must lie.

== Production ==
In March 2021, Bell Media formally acquired the rights to produce a Canadian adaptation of I Can See Your Voice for the French-speaking audiences (especially the province of Quebec), with Productions J and ToRoS co-assigning on production duties.

== Broadcast history ==
Qui sait chanter? debuted on 13 September 2021, with filming taking place at Place Bell in Laval.

While the first season broadcasts still ongoing, Noovo already renewed the series for a second season, with filming taking place at Scène Éthique in Varennes. It premiered with Paul Daraîche playing in a Wild West special on 12 September 2022, continuing with regular episodes the following week. Other thematic games that have played include Rita Baga in a Halloween special on 31 October 2022 and Marc Hervieux in a holiday special that concluded on 12 December 2022.

== Series overview ==
Season	Episodes	Originally released		Good singers	Bad singers
Season	Episodes	First released	Last released	Good singers	Bad singers
1	13	13 September 2021	13 December 2021	9	4
2	10	19 September 2022	5 December 2022	8	2
Sp	3	12 September 2022	12 December 2022	2	1

== Episodes ==
=== Season 1 (2021) ===
List of season 1 episodes
No. overall	No. in season	Guest artist(s)	Player order (Note: It refers to the guest artist(s) that have played in according to their first game; returning guest artists (which also include foreigners or former good singers, with their names displaying in italics) are not counted.)	Contestant	Original release date	CAN-QC viewers (millions)
1	1	Annie Villeneuve	1	Mounya Iklid	13 September 2021	0.589
2	2	Marie-Mai	2	Marc-André Rioux	27 September 2021	NR
3	3	Corneille	3	Robine-Claudia Joseph	4 October 2021	NR
4	4	Claude Cobra (Bleu Jeans Bleu)	4	Éliane Morin-Côté	11 October 2021	0.649
5	5	2Frères	5	Mickael Grondin	18 October 2021	NR
6	6	Martine St. Clair	6	Johanne Belot	25 October 2021	NR
7	7	Ludovick Bourgeois	7	Alexandra Gauthier	1 November 2021	NR
8	8	Brigitte Boisjoli	8	Robert Applyrs	8 November 2021	NR
9	9	Damien Robitaille	9	Stéphanie Caron	15 November 2021	NR
10	10	Alicia Moffet	10	Exaucé Luyengi	22 November 2021	NR
11	11	Guylaine Tanguay	11	Marie-Claude Audet	29 November 2021	NR
12	12	Roxane Bruneau	12	Marc-André Savard	6 December 2021	0.559
13	13	Maxime Landry	13	Annie Fréchette	13 December 2021	0.614

=== Season 2 (2022) ===
List of season 2 episodes
No. overall	No. in season	Guest artist(s)	Player order	Contestant	Original release date
14	1	Andréanne A. Malette	15	Jude César	19 September 2022
15	2	France D'Amour	16	Guylaine Tremblay	26 September 2022
16	3	Jean-François Breau	17	Ariane-Hébert Métellus	10 October 2022
17	4	FouKi	18	Julie Ranger	17 October 2022
18	5	Johanne Blouin	19	Alexandre des Roches	24 October 2022
19	6	William Cloutier	21	Laurie Lambert	7 November 2022
20	7	Roxane Bruneau	—	Nate Bolduc	14 November 2022
21	8	Marc Déry	22	Marko Estrada	21 November 2022
22	9	Marjo	23	Andréanne Ouellet-Gagnon	28 November 2022
23	10	Boom Desjardins	24	Farah Jacques	5 December 2022

=== Specials ===
List of special episodes
No.	Title	Guest artist(s)	Player order	Contestant	Original release date
1	"Wild West special"	Paul Daraîche	14	Jacques LaBerge	12 September 2022
2	"Halloween special"	Rita Baga	20	Marianne LaRose-Galarneau	31 October 2022
3	"Holiday special"	Marc Hervieux	25	Sylvain Vigneau	12 December 2022

== Accolades ==
Event	Year (Note: Indicates the year of ceremony)	Category	Nominee(s)	Result	Ref(s)
Prix Gémeaux	2022	Best Game Show	Qui sait chanter?	Nominated	
Prix Gémeaux	2022	Best Direction	Benoit Giguère, Stéphane Laporte, and David Quintin	Won	
Prix Gémeaux	2022	Best Program Host	Phil Roy	Nominated	
Prix Gémeaux	2023	Best Direction	Benoit Giguère, Stéphane Laporte, and David Quintin	Nominated	
