= Giulia Riva =

Italian sprinter

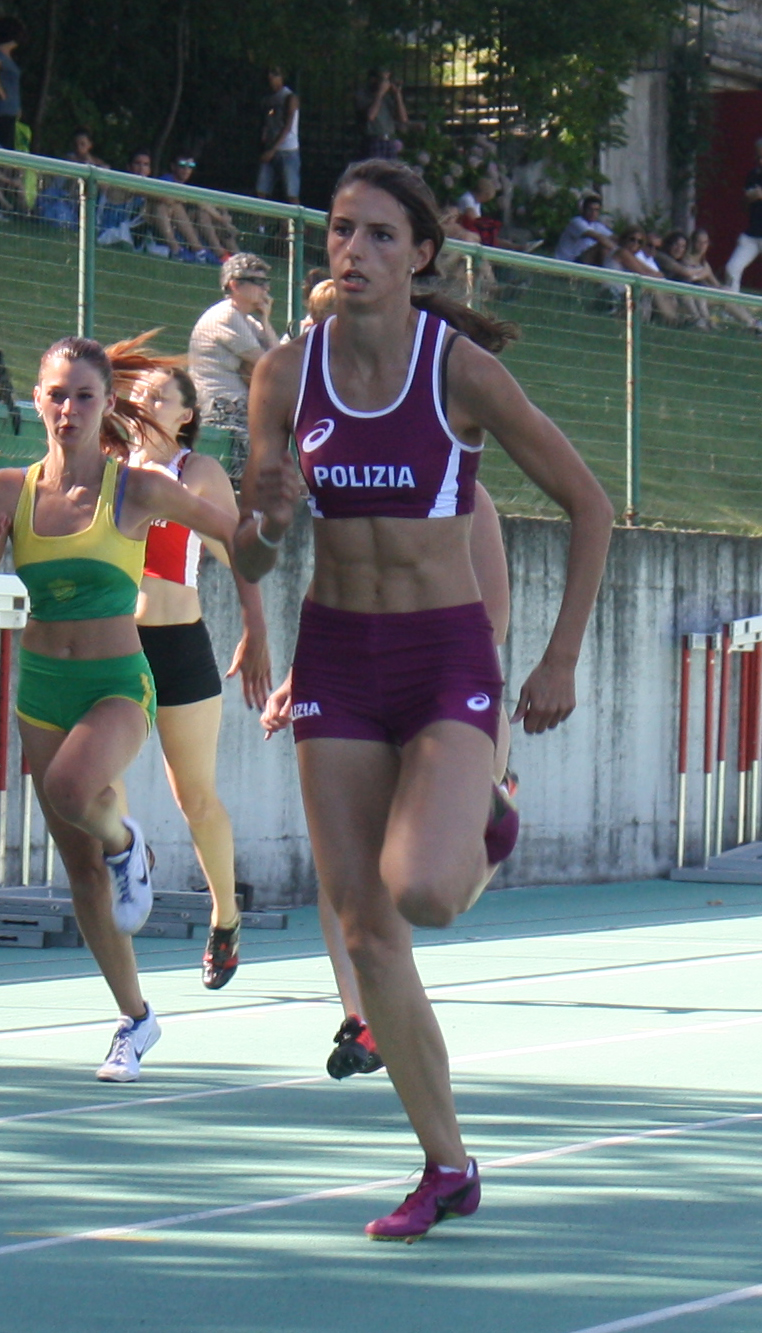
- Giulia Riva in 2016 with the Fiamme Oro jersey.

Personal information
- Born: 31 January 1992 (age 34)

Sport
- Country: Italy
- Sport: Athletics
- Event(s): 100 metres 4 × 100 metres relay
- Club: G.S. Fiamme Oro

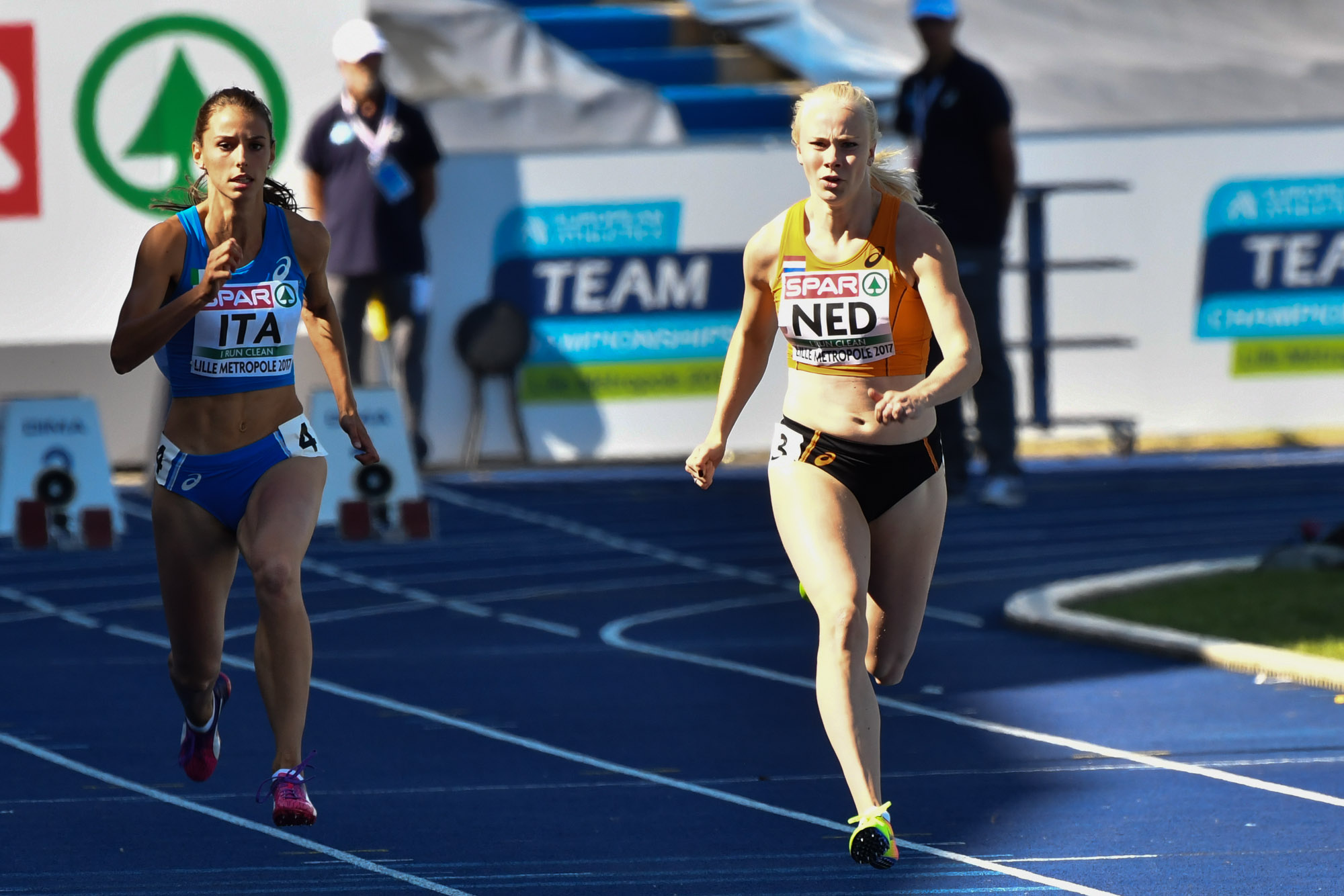
Riva during the B-race 100 m at the 2017 European Team Championships.

Giulia Riva (born 31 January 1992) is an Italian sprinter. She competed in the 4 × 100 metres relay event at the 2015 World Championships in Athletics in Beijing, China.

== See also ==
- Italian all-time lists - 4x100 metres relay
