= Flora Gionest-Roussy =

Canadian singer-songwriter and actor

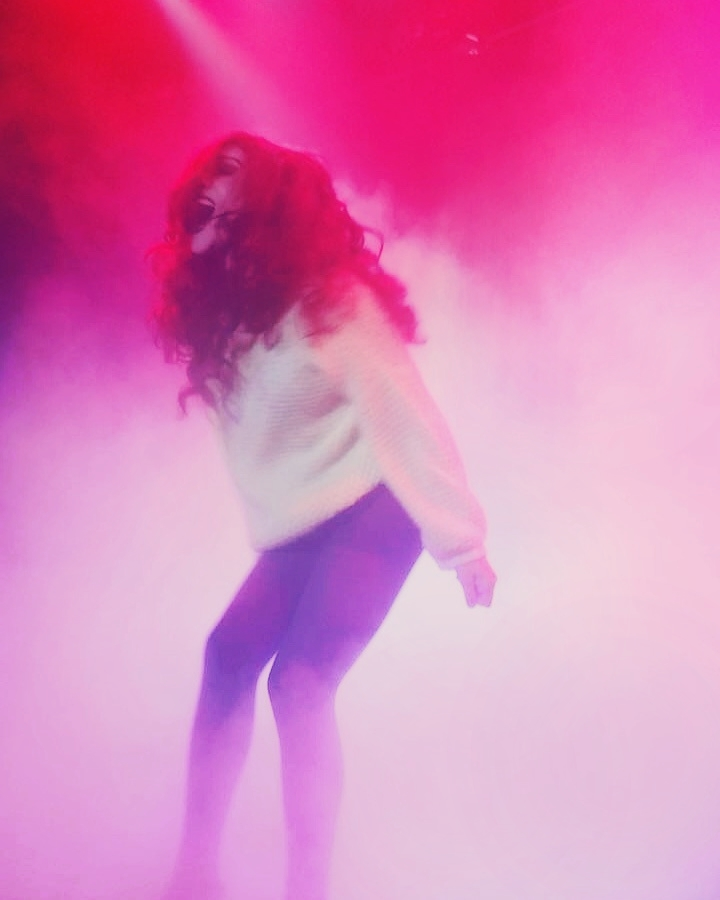
- Flora Gionest-Roussy in 2016.
- Born: 20 November 1995 (age 30); Chandler, Quebec
- Occupations: Singer, songwriter, actor

Flora Gionest-Roussy (known professionally as Flora Gionest) is a French Canadian actress, self-portrait photographer, singer-songwriter and drag queen.

== Biography ==
Born in Chandler, Quebec, and raised in the community of Pabos Mills, Flora struggled with anti-queer bullying for years before dropping out of high school at 15 and leaving her hometown at 17.

She became homeless in Montreal for two years before launching Silver Catalano (2015-2019) as a drag musical project, first attracting widespread media attention in 2016 and 2017 for her synthwave single Wave.

Her career has been marked by LGBTQ+ activism, including being a part of the first drag show ever staged in the Gaspésie—Les Îles-de-la-Madeleine.

Gionest-Roussy is a non-binary trans woman.
