= Farah Jacques =

Canadian sprinter

Personal information
- Born: February 8, 1990 (age 36) Montreal, Quebec
- Height: 174 cm (5 ft 8 1/2 in)
- Weight: 59 kg (130 lb)

Sport
- Country: Canada
- Sport: Athletics
- Event: Sprints

Achievements and titles
- Personal best: 200m: 23.21

Farah Jacques (born February 8, 1990, in Montreal, Quebec) is a Canadian track and field athlete competing in the sprint events, predominantly the 200m event.

In July 2016, she was officially named to Canada's Olympic team as part of the 4×100 meters relay team.
