= France D'Amour =

Canadian singer (born 1964)

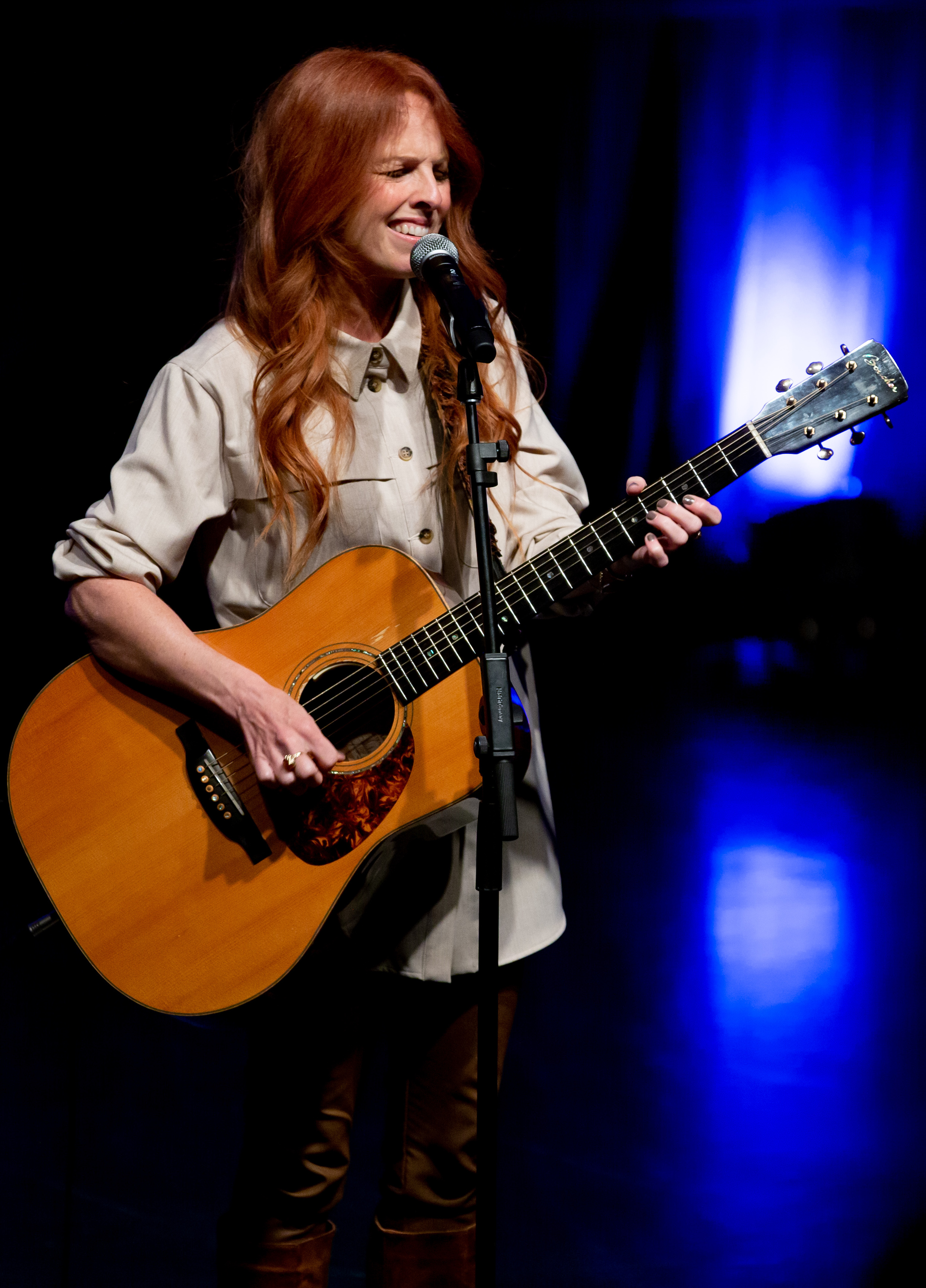
- D'Amour in 2022

Background information
- Born: March 30, 1964 (age 62); Mont-Rolland, Sainte-Adèle, Quebec, Canada
- Occupations: Singer, Songwriter.

France D'Amour (born France Rochon on March 30, 1964) is a French Canadian singer songwriter from Quebec.

She studied music at Collège Lionel-Groulx in Sainte-Thérèse, Quebec specialising in jazz and playing guitar. Later, she was part of various musical formations, notably U-Bahn, The Answer and France. In 1992, she gained great fame with her debut album Animal that was certified gold in Quebec. In 2002, she had success in France as well through her collaboration with Jean-Jacques Goldman, who co-wrote the album with his team (Robert Goldman, Jacques Veneruso, Christophe Battaglia, Erick Benzi and Gildas Arzel).

She has also appeared on stage and in film. In 1998, she played the role of Esmeralda in a French tour version of the musical comedy Notre-Dame-de-Paris. She also appeared in a secondary role in the film Les Boys 3 as well as in the film's soundtrack.

France d'Amour has a son, François, born in 1988. In April 2011, she also confirmed during a popular talk show on Quebec television Tout le monde en parle that she followed the Church of Scientology for almost 20 years.

== Discography ==
=== Albums ===
- 1992: Animal
- 1994: Déchaînée
- 1998: Le Silence des roses
- 2002: France D'Amour
- 2005: Hors de tout doute
- 2007: Les autres
- 2009: Le présent
- 2011: Bubble Bath & Champagne
- 2013: En love majeur
- 2016: Bubble Bath & Champagne, Volume 2
- 2019: D'Amour et Rock&roll
- 2024: Quatorze

Compilation albums

- 2000: Nomade (compilation)
- 2018: Best of (compilation)
