= Roxane Bruneau =

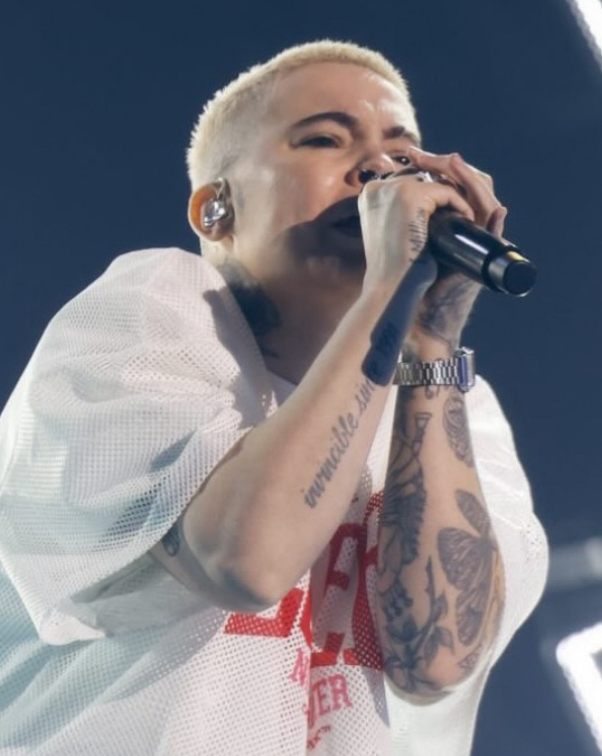
- Roxane Bruneau in 2025

Background information
- Born: January 14, 1991 (age 35); Delson, Quebec
- Genres: Pop
- Occupation: Musician
- Instrument: Vocals

Roxane Bruneau (born January 14, 1991) is a Canadian pop singer and songwriter from Delson, Quebec. She is most noted as the winner of the Felix Award for Female Artist of the Year at the 43rd Félix Awards in 2021.

She released her debut album Dysphorie in 2017. At the 40th Félix Awards in 2018, she was nominated for Pop Album of the Year and Revelation of the Year. At the 41st Félix Awards in 2019, she won Song of the Year for her single "Des p'tits bouts de toi", and at the 42nd Félix Awards in 2020, she was a Song of the Year nominee for "Aime-moi encore".

Dysphorie was certified gold in November 2019.

Her second album, Acrophobie, was released in 2020. The album debuted at No. 6 on the Canadian Albums Chart. By March 2021, Bruneau had sold 100,000 records, and Acrophobie was certified gold in November 2021.

In addition to Female Artist of the Year, Bruneau also won the Félix Awards for Song of the Year for "À ma manière", Pop Album of the Year and Bestselling Album of the Year in 2021. In the same year, she was one of the regular panellists alongside Rita Baga on Qui sait chanter?, the Quebec adaptation of I Can See Your Voice.

An out lesbian, Bruneau became engaged to Caroline Lefort in 2019. In an October 2021 episode of Ici Radio-Canada Télé's variety series En direct de l'univers, Lefort, who is not a professional singer, serenaded Bruneau with a cover of Vincent Vallières's song "On va s'aimer encore".

Acrophobie was a Juno Award nominee for Francophone Album of the Year at the Juno Awards of 2022.

Bruneau was featured as a Comeback Stage coach on La Deuxième Voix on La Voix in 2023. In 2024 and 2026, she was a coach on the regular version of La Voix. Bruneau was the victorious coach in 2026 when her artist, Rosemarie Boivin, won the season.
