= Mario Pelchat =

Canadian Francophone singer from Quebec (born 1964)

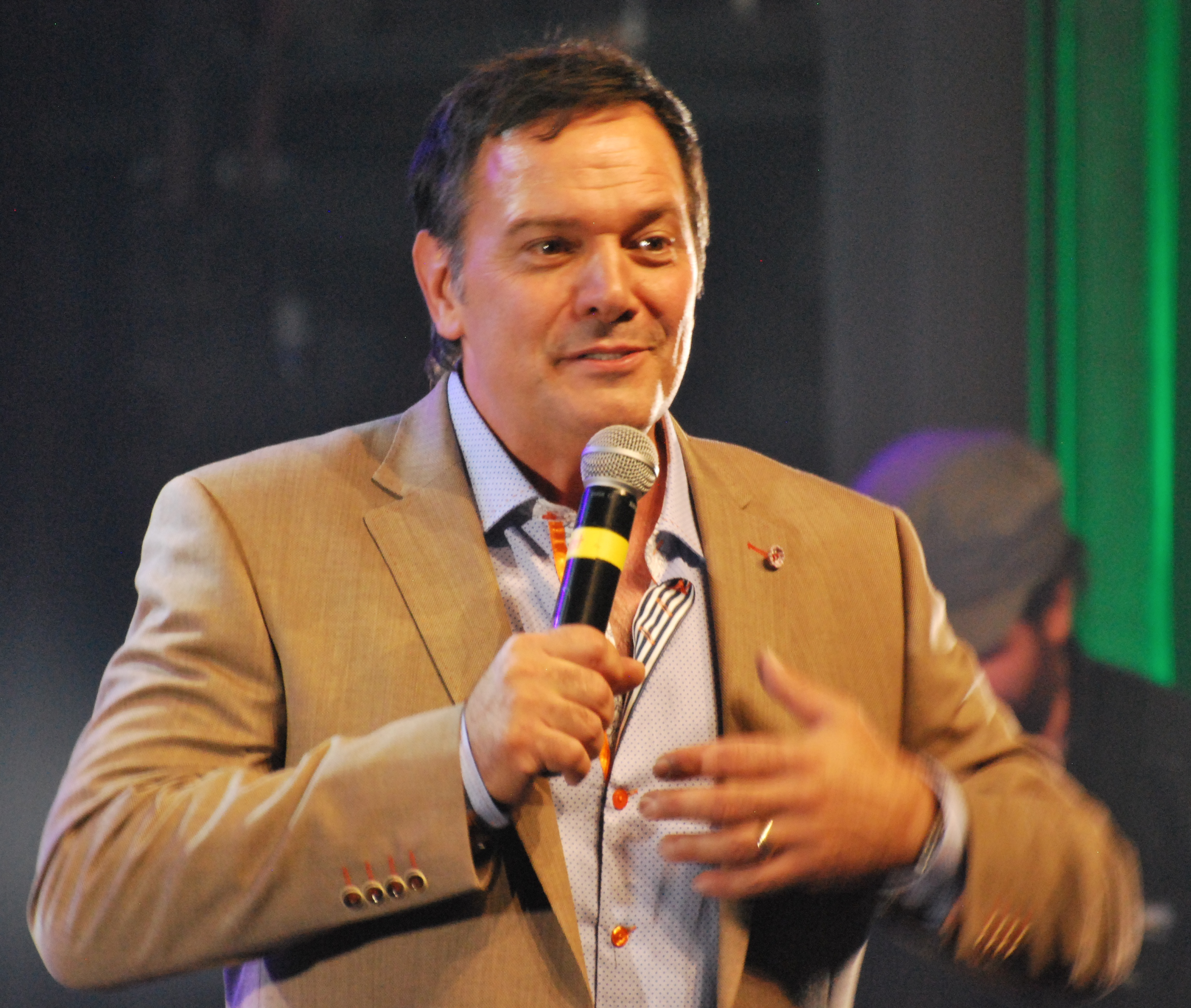
- Mario Pelchat in 2014

Background information
- Born: 1 February 1964 (age 62); Dolbeau-Mistassini, Quebec, Canada
- Genre: French pop
- Occupation: Singer–songwriter
- Years active: 1981–present
- Labels: Sony Musique, Musicor
- Website: mariopelchat.com

Mario Pelchat (born 1 February 1964) is a Canadian Francophone singer from Quebec. He received the Felix Award in 1990 and 1992.

== Biography ==
Pelchat was born in Dolbeau-Mistassini, Quebec and has performed since 1973. His first 45 RPM single was released in September 1981. His early albums include 1982's Je suis un chanteur (I Am a Singer) and Tu m’as fait mal (You hurt me) the following year. His 1988 self-titled album and 1990's Couleur Passion (The Color of Passion) attained gold record sales status. His 1992 double-platinum album Pelchat on the Sony label included a duet with Céline Dion. He also recorded with Belgian singer Maurane on his Pelchat 2002 album. He also recorded How Do You Keep The Music Playing with Dionne Warwick on his 2009 Album - Mario Pelchat chante Michel Legrand - Album Produced/Arranged and Piano played by Michel Legrand.

Pelchat has performed in various theatrical productions. He played the title role in a 1998 musical on the artist Picasso during a European tour. He portrayed Quasimodo in a production of Notre Dame de Paris, Moses in a production of The Ten Commandments and Don Carlos in Don Juan.

He earned ADISQ's Félix Awards for Male Singer of The Year in 1990 and Album of the Year for 1992's Pelchat. He also earned a Jazz album Félix for the 2009 collaborative album Mario Pelchat-Michel Legrand. Besides touring in Canada, Pelchat has performed in Europe, the Middle East and the United States.

== Discography ==
=== Studio albums ===
Year	Album	CAN	CRIA
1982	Je suis un chanteur	—	Platinum
1983	Tu m'as fait mal	—	
1988	Mario Pelchat	—	Gold
1990	Couleur passion	—	Gold
1993	Pelchat	—	2× Platinum
1995	C'est la vie	—	Gold
1999	VII	—	Gold
2002	Pelchat 2002	—	
2004	Noël avec Jireh Gospel Choir	—	
2006	Le monde où je vais	—	Gold
2009	Mario Pelchat chante Michel Legrand	—	
2010	Toujours de nous	3	Gold
2017	Agnus Dei (with Les Prêtres)	5	Gold
2017	Noel Ensemble (with Les Prêtres)	3	
2019	Pelchat Aznavour désormais	22	
2021	Comme au premier rendez-vous	27	

=== Live albums ===
Year	Album
2003	Live

=== Compilation albums ===
Year	Album	CAN
1998	Mes premières chansons	—
1998	Les incontournables	—
2011	Je suis un chanteur	84
