= Taina =

Taina may refer to:

== People ==
=== Women ===
– also named Taïna, Taína, or Tainá –

- Taina Asili (fl. 1995–present), Puerto Rican musician, filmmaker and activist
- Taïna Barioz (born 1988), French alpine skier
- Taina Bien-Aimé, Swiss social activist
- Taina Bofferding (born 1982), Luxembourgish politician, Minister of the Interior and of Equality between Men and Women
- Taína Caragol, American art historian, author, and curator.
- Taina Elg (1930–2025), Finnish-American actress and dancer
- Taina Impiö (born 1956), Finnish cross-country skier
- Taina Kolkkala (born 1976), Finnish javelin thrower
- Taina Mair (born 2003), American basketball player
- Tainá Müller (born 1982), Brazilian actress
- Tainá Paixão (born 1991), Brazilian basketball player
- Taina Salmia (born 1962), Finnish competitor in the 1985 World Allround Speed Skating Championships for women
- Anneli Taina (born 1951), Finnish politician
- Taína (model), Puerto Rican model Noris Díaz Pérez (born 1975)
- Tainá (footballer) (born 1995), Brazilian footballer

=== Men ===
- Taïna Adama Soro (born 1981), Ivorian former footballer

== Entertainment ==
- Taina (TV series), an American sitcom
- The Tainá trilogy, a series of movies comprising:
  - Tainá: An Adventure in the Amazon
  - Tainá 2: A New Amazon Adventure
  - Tainá 3: The Origin
- Caveira (Rainbow Six Siege), Taina "Caveira" Pereira, a player character in several video games
- A fictional kingdom in the 1999 novel Enchantment by Orson Scott Card

== See also ==
- Taíno (disambiguation)
