= Leon Góes =

Brazilian actor and theatre director

- Born: 15 August 1964 (age 60); Natal, Rio Grande do Norte, Brazil
- Occupation(s): Actor, theatre director
- Years active: 1986–present

Leon Góes (born 15 August 1964) is a Brazilian actor and theatre director. The son of educator and historian Moacyr de Góes, he is also the brother of director Moacyr Góes.

== Filmography ==
=== Film ===
Year	Film	Role
2019	O Trampo	
2013	Bonitinha, mas Ordinária	Peixoto
2013	Tainá - A Origem	Bu
2013	A Dança de Feliciano	Feliciano
2007	O Homem Que Desafiou o Diabo	Corcunda Lombroso
2004	Irmãos de Fé	João
2004	Um Show de Verão	Manager
2003	Maria, Mãe do Filho de Deus	Apóstolo Tiago
2003	Dom	Theatre director
2002	A Paixão de Jacobina	Jacó Mula
1996	Tieta of Agreste	Ascânio Trindade
1994	Veja Esta Canção	Zé Maria ("Pisada de Elefante" segment)
1986	A Cor do Seu Destino	

=== Television ===
Year	Title	Role	Note
2019	Os Homens São de Marte... E é pra Lá que Eu Vou	Heitor	Episode: "Tudo Novo de Novo"
2007	Donas de Casa Desesperadas	Thomas Salgado	
2003	Linha Direta	João Alamy Filho	Episode: "Irmãos Naves"
2000	Laços de Família	Bento	
1998	Você Decide	Henrique	Episode: "A Mulher Ideal"
1996	A Vida como Ela é...	Various roles	13 episodes

== Theatre pieces ==
Leon Góes at one point joined the Companhia de Encenação Teatral, directed by his brother, Moacyr Góes.

Plays Leon has played in include:

- "Baal"
- "Bonitinha mas Ordinária"
- "Os Justos"
- "Divinas Palavras"
- "Pinóquio"
- "A Almanjarra"
- "Romeu e Julieta"
- "O Livro de Jó"
- "Fausto"
- "Gigante da Montanha"
- "Epifanias"
- "Trilogia Tebana"
- "Gregório"
- "A Visita da Velha Senhora"
- "Escola de Bufões" (for which he received the Prêmio Mambembe for best actor).
- A Falecida

He created, acted in and directed an adaptation of "Chico Doido de Caicó". He also directed "Rainha Esther" with Ida Gomes.
