= Kamasutra (Adassa album) =

Studio album by Adassa
- Released: March 15, 2005
- Recorded: 2005
- Genre: Reggaeton
- Label: Universal Music Latino
- Producer: Don Candiani; Sahpreem King

Adassa chronology
On the Floor (2004)	Kamasutra (2005)	Adassa (2007)

Singles from Kamasutra
- 1. "De Tra" Released: 2005; 2. "Dejare de Quererte" Released: 2005

Singles from Kamasutra: Coleccion De Lujo
- 1. "Kamasutra" Released: 2006

Kamasutra is the second studio album by Colombian-American reggaeton singer-songwriter Adassa, released on March 15, 2005, by Universal Music Latino. It is her first commercially successful album.

== Album details ==
The album includes hits such as "De Tra," "Dejare de Quererte," and "Kamasutra". The song "De Tra" reached No. 40 on Billboard Latin Tropical Airplay chart.

== Kamasutra: Coleccion De Lujo ==
Kamasutra: Coleccion De Lujo (released on February 17, 2006) is a 2006 re-edition of Kamasutra, on the Deluxe Edition the track list ends on track 15, Vas a Regresar. Tracks 16 through 19 are featured videos from the album.

== Track listing ==
=== Standard edition ===
1. "Cada Vez Que Te Veo" (Don Candiani) – 3:11
2. "De Tra" (featuring Taino) (Taino & Don Candiani) – 2:50
3. "I Got A Thing" (Don Candiani) – 3:34
4. "Dadi" (featuring Millomaster) (Emilo Efrain Aldea & Don Candiani) – 3:34
5. "Kamasutra" (featuring Pitbull) (Pitbull & Don Candiani) – 3:01
6. "Dime Mamacita" (Don Candiani & Sahpreem King) – 3:39
7. "Ya No Soy Tu Mujer" (featuring Lisa M) (Lisa M & Don Candiani) – 3:31
8. "Dejare de Quererte" (Don Candiani) – 3:35
9. "Para Ganarte Mi Amor" (featuring Baby Rasta & Gringo) (Baby Rasta & Don Candiani) – 3:23
10. "Tu" (Don Candiani) – 3:49
11. "Bang Bang" (Don Candiani) – 3:48
12. "Ese Boom" (Don Candiani) – 3:56
13. "Dame" (Don Candiani) – 3:15
14. "Without You" (Don Candiani) – 3:47
15. "Vas a Regresar" (Don Candiani) – 3:55

=== Kamasutra: Coleccion De Lujo ===
- Track #1–15 from standard edition, and includes a DVD.

DVD

1. "De Tra (Dance on Me)"
2. "Bang Bang"
3. "Dame (Gimme – Ninfo's Anthem)"
4. "Tu (Heading for Disaster)"
