= Taíno (disambiguation) =

The term Taíno refers to an Indigenous people of the Caribbean.

Taino may also refer to:

- The Taíno language, their Arawakan language, now extinct
- Taino, Lombardy, a town in Italy
- Eric Taino (born 1975), American tennis player
- Radio Taíno, a Cuban radio station
- Joel Bosch, Puerto Rican rapper also known as Taino

== See also ==
- Taina (disambiguation)
- Indigenous peoples of the Caribbean
