= Love by Grace =

Single by Lara Fabian

from the album Lara Fabian
- Released: October 2, 2000
- Recorded: 1999
- Genre: Pop; power ballad
- Length: 4:09
- Songwriters: Wayne Tester; Dave Loggins
- Producer: Walter Afanasieff

Lara Fabian singles chronology
"I Am Who I Am" (2000)	"Love by Grace" (2000)	"Meu Grande Amor" (2001)

Alternative cover
- International single cover

"Love by Grace" is a song written by Wayne Tester and Dave Loggins, and originally recorded by the American country singer Wynonna Judd and included on her third studio album Revelations (1996). It was later covered by Belgian singer Lara Fabian, and released as the fourth single of her English-debut self-titled album on October 2, 2000. Produced by American producer Walter Afanasieff, the song is a classic ballad with potent vocals, which were highly praised by music critics.

A modest hit on the US Adult Contemporary radio, the song became a smash hit in Brazil, reaching the top of the charts for eight weeks, after being featured on the soundtrack of the Brazilian hit soap opera Laços de Família (2000), where it became notorious on a scene where one of the protagonists (played by actress Carolina Dieckmann) shaved her hair after discovering she had leukemia. In Portugal, it was also successful, reaching the top-three on the Portuguese charts, whilst elsewhere, the song performed moderately in Germany and Sweden.

== Background and release ==
"Love by Grace" was written by songwriters Wayne Tester and Dave Loggins to be included on the American country singer Wynonna Judd's third studio album Revelations (1996). Michael McCall of Allmusic praised her rendition, calling it a "highlight", noting that in it she "prove[s] how sympathetic her rich, expressive voice can be when applied to a well-written, sensitive lyric." After learning that the Canadian singer Céline Dion was retiring for two years after 1999, Sony Music expressed the desire to sign with the Belgian-Italian singer Lara Fabian to record her first English album, since both are considered power ballad singers.

In 2000, the album was released to positive reception and her debut English single, "I Will Love Again", successfully charted well in many countries, including the U.S., which received it with a warm reception on the radio. After that, "Love By Grace" was promoted to adult contemporary radio on October 2, 2000. A CD single format was also available on November 16, 2000, containing four tracks, including live versions of "I Will Love Again" and "Caruso" (taken from her TV special "From Lara with Love") as well as studio versions of the songs "Love By Grace" and "To Love Again".

== Composition and lyrics ==
"Love By Grace" is a power ballad produced by Walter Afanasieff, known for working with Mariah Carey in many of her ballad hits. Lyrically, the song discusses the "turmoil of romance" and "celebrates commitment as one half of a quarrelling couple returns home to mend the relationship." While analyzing the album, William Ruhlmann of AllMusic noted that the song "almost invariably swelling portentously halfway through the track so the singer can take off on an overwrought tear."

== Critical reception ==
In a review of the song, Chuck Taylor wrote positively for Billboard, calling it a "timeless piece of music, searingly hot in its impact on the heart and cool as ice in Fabian’s passionate, startlingly adept delivery." The review also praised the singer's emotional depth and maturity, noting that her performance could resonate strongly with fans seeking authenticity rather than a superficial persona, naming it a "gorgeous anthem" and "a stellar musical moment from the finest talent of 2000". The Dooyoo review was extremely positive, labelling it "a beautiful song - beautifully sung and arranged", noting that whilst the original Wynonna Judd version featured a prominent country arrangement, "in Fabian's hands it becomes a stunning ballad", praising Afanasieff's production, saying "he reigns in Fabian's vocals until close to the end, but still finishes the song softly".

== Chart performance and recognition ==
"Love By Grace" debuted at number 28 on the US Adult Contemporary chart on the week of December 9, 2000. Seven weeks later, the song rose to its peak position, number 25 on the week of January 27, after spending two weeks at number 27. It spent a total of 13 weeks on the chart and finished 95th on its year-end chart. In some European countries, the song only managed to reach numbers 59 and 85 in Sweden and Germany, respectively.

In Brazil, the song became a massive hit after being featured on the 2000 soap opera Laços de Família (English: Family Ties). It was the theme of Carolina Dieckmann's character Camila, who discovered she had leukemia throughout the episodes. The scene where she shaved her head with the song in the background prompted the song to achieve tremendous success, rising from number 39 to number 2. It would later attained the top of the Brazilian charts, where it remained at the top summit for eight consecutive weeks, finishing second in "Brazilian Top 100 Songs" of 2001" and helping the soap opera's soundtrack to increase its sales in 2 million copies, according to APBD. Likewise, in Portugal, the song became Fabian's biggest hit, debuting straight at number 3, being also catapulted after the success of the soap opera there.

The gospel group Anointed covered the song for its 1999 self-titled album. Following the success of the song in Brazil, Brazilian singer Marina Elali recorded a Portuguese version of the song in 2005 titled "Só Por Você" (English: Only For You) for her debut studio album.

== Formats and track listings ==
- US CD single
1. "Love by Grace" - 4:08
2. "I Will Love Again (Live From PBS)" - 3:50
3. "To Love Again (Si Tu M'Aimes)" - 3:45
4. "Caruso (Live From PBS)" - 5:14
- European single
1. "Love by Grace" - 4:08
2. "I Will Love Again (Live From PBS)" - 3:50

== Charts ==
Chart	Peak position
Brazil (Crowley)	1
Germany (Official German Charts)	85
Portugal (AFP)	3
Sweden (Sverigetopplistan)	59
US AC Top 30 (Radio & Records)	27
US Adult Contemporary (Billboard)	25

=== Year-end charts ===
Chart (2000)	Position
US Adult Contemporary (Radio & Records)	94
Chart (2001)	Position
Brazil (Crowley)	2

== Release history ==
Release dates and formats for "Love By Grace"
Region	Date	Format	Label	Ref.
United States	October 2, 2000	Adult contemporary airplay	Sony Music	
United States	November 16, 2000	CD single	Sony Music	
