= Lara Fabian (1999 album) =

Studio album by Lara Fabian
- Released: 29 November 1999
- Recorded: 1998–1999
- Studio: Capitol Studios (Los Angeles); Larrabee West Studios (Los Angeles); Studio Marko (Montreal); The Hit Factory (New York); The Record Plant (Los Angeles)
- Genre: Pop; dance-pop; pop rock
- Length: 74:39
- Label: Columbia; Epic; Sony
- Producer: Walter Afanasieff; Rick Allison; Louis Biancaniello; Patrick Leonard; Dave Pickell; Brian Rawling; Evan Rogers; Carl Sturken; Mark Taylor; Sam Watters

Lara Fabian chronology
Live (1999)	Lara Fabian (1999)	Nue (2001)

Alternative cover
- International Version

Singles from Lara Fabian
- 1. "Adagio" Released: December 1999; 2. "I Will Love Again" Released: 18 April 2000; 3. "I Am Who I Am" Released: 18 September 2000; 4. "Love by Grace" Released: December 2000; 5. "To Love Again (Meu Grande Amor)" Released: December 2001

Lara Fabian is the fourth studio album and the first English-language album by pop singer Lara Fabian. It was first released on 29 November 1999 in France and was released worldwide in 2000. The album features the hit singles “I Will Love Again”, “I Am Who I Am” and “Love by Grace”.

== Background ==
In March 1999, Fabian released her first live album, named Live, which debuted at number one on the French Albums Chart. This helped seal an international recording contract with Sony Music. Fabian went to New York City and San Francisco to record her first album in English. She wrote or co-wrote most of the songs, working with Rick Allison and producers Walter Afanasieff, Patrick Leonard, Sam Watters and Mark Taylor. Both versions of "Adagio" and the song "To Love Again (Si Tu M'Aimes)" feature Steve Lukather guitar solos. The song "Till I Get Over You" was produced by the duo Louis Biancaniello and Sam Watters.

== Promotion ==
Promotion for Lara Fabian initially targeted the United States, with the album released in May 2000 through Sony Music. Fabian launched the album with an appearance on NBC's Today and later appeared on several American television programs, including The Tonight Show, The View, Access Hollywood and The Late Late Show with Craig Kilborn. From June 2000 to February 2001, the song "Love by Grace" was featured as the theme for the lead couple in the Brazilian telenovela Laços de Família, broadcast by Rede Globo in Brazil and Portugal. During its run, the song received extensive airplay and reached number one on multiple radio charts in both countries, contributing to increased recognition for Fabian in those markets. Following the broadcast of From Lara with Love, her first American television special on PBS, Fabian participated in WKTU New York’s annual radio special Miracle on 34th Street. An Asian edition of the album included "Light of My Life," a duet with Taiwanese singer-songwriter Leehom Wang. The song was later featured in the 2000 Hong Kong action film China Strike Force.

== Singles ==
The album's second single, "I Will Love Again," was written by Mark Taylor and Paul Barry. Four versions of the song were produced: two in English and two in Spanish, each featuring both a dance-pop version and a ballad reprise. A dance-pop and Europop ballad that talks about overcoming a painful breakup with hopes of eventually loving somebody again. "I Will Love Again" reached number five in Belgium's Wallonia region and number eight in New Zealand. In the United States, the song topped the US Billboard Dance Club Songs chart and peaked at number 32 on the Billboard Hot 100. Elsewhere, the single reached the top 20 in Austria, Canada, France, Hungary, Iceland, Spain, and Switzerland.

"I Am Who I Am," written by Fabian and Rick Allison with its producers Carl Sturken and Evan Rogers, was released as the third single from the album on September 18, 2000. It charted inside the top-twenty in Canada, as well as the lower-regions of France, Germany and Switzerland charts. "Love by Grace," originally recorded by the American country singer Wynonna Judd and included on her third studio album Revelations (1996), was released as the fourth single from Lara Fabian on October 2, 2000. A modest hit on the US Adult Contemporary radio, the song became a smash hit in Brazil, reaching the top of the charts for eight weeks. In Portugal, it was also successful, reaching the top-three on the Portuguese Singles Chart, whilst elsewhere, the song performed moderately in Germany and Sweden.

== Critical reception ==
Professional ratings
Review scores
Source	Rating
AllMusic	3/5 stars

AllMusic editor William Ruhlmann wrote that the ten credited producers "have created widescreen power ballads with the occasional dance song thrown in. The lyrics are the usual generalized depictions of the joys and turmoil of romance, with the music almost invariably swelling portentously halfway through the track so the singer can take off on an overwrought tear. Fabian has the pipes to handle such material and is actually better at singing in English than Dion [...] Fabian has her work cut out for her, but she's taken a big step toward filling Dion's shoes with this album." Writing for Amazon.com Courtney Kemp described Lara Fabian as "56 minutes of bland, predictable love songs, heavy on ballads, with plenty of vocal gymnastics. Already a French-language superstar, Fabian alternates between vulnerable softie and tough cookie—failing to prove she's either, but belting her heart out nonetheless."

== Cover versions ==
The album's opening track, "Adagio," has also been covered by Nightwish singer Floor Jansen, by Ancient Bards singer Sara Squadrani and by Il Divo. The songs "Adagio" and "Broken Vow" were covered by Filipino singers, Mark Bautista and Sarah Geronimo. Also Josh Groban covered "Broken Vow" for his 2003 album Closer, and Lebanese singer Majida El Roumi recorded an Arabic cover of "Adagio", titled "Habibi", for her 2006 album E'tazalt El Gharam. Kazakh singer Dimash Kudaibergen sang "Adagio" in his "wild card" entry performance in 2017 on the Chinese talent competition Singer, which catapulted him to world-wide notice, also performing it on the US show The World's Best. In 2019, he and Lara performed together in a concerts with Igor Krutoy and Dimash joined Lara to perform the song in London in 2025.

== Track listing ==
Lara Fabian track listing
No.	Title	Writer(s)	Producer(s)	Length
1.	"Adagio"	Lara Fabian; Remo Giazotto; Rick Allison; Dave Pickell	Allison	4:28
2.	"Part of Me"	Fabian; Patrick Leonard	Leonard	4:32
3.	"Givin' Up On You"	Fabian; Leonard	Leonard	4:36
4.	"You Are My Heart"	Walter Afanasieff; Allison; Fabian; John Bettis	Afanasieff	4:10
5.	"I Am Who I Am"	Allison; Fabian; Evan Rogers; Carl Sturken	Rogers; Sturken	3:47
6.	"To Love Again (Si Tu M'Aimes)"	Allison; Fabian; Bruce Roberts	Allison; Pickell	3:46
7.	"You're Not From Here"	Afanasieff; Allison; Fabian; Bettis	Afanasieff	4:49
8.	"Till I Get Over You"	Louis Biancaniello; Sam Watters	Biancaniello; Watters	3:45
9.	"Love by Grace"	Wayne Tester; Dave Loggins	Afanasieff	4:09
10.	"Yeliel (My Angel)"	Fabian; Leonard	Leonard	5:02
11.	"I Will Love Again"	Paul Barry; Mark Taylor	Barry; Taylor	3:45
12.	"Broken Vow"	Afanasieff; Fabian	Afanasieff	5:16
13.	"Adagio" (Italian version)	Tomaso Albinoni; Allison; Fabian; Pickell	Allison; Pickell	4:28
Total length:				74:39

Bonus tracks
No.	Title	Writer(s)	Producer(s)	Length
14.	"Before We Say Goodbye"	Joanne Houlden; Pickell	Allison; Pickell	4:28
15.	"Ivy"	Fabian; Glen Ballard	Ballard	4:24
16.	"Light of My Life" (duet with Leehom Wang)	Amy Sky; Fabian; Pickell	Allison; Pickell	4:14
17.	"I Will Love Again" (ballad reprise)	Fabian; K. C. Porter; Chein Garcia Alonso	Porter	4:55
18.	"Sola Otra Vez"	Fabian; Porter; Alonso	Porter	4:55
19.	"Quédate"	Denise Rich; Porter; Alonso	Porter	4:29
20.	"Otro Amor Vendrá (I Will Love Again)"	Barry; Taylor; Alonso	Barry; Taylor	3:42
21.	"Otro Amor Vendrá (I Will Love Again)" (ballad reprise)	Barry; Taylor; Alonso	Barry; Taylor	4:53
22.	"Sin Ti"	Claudia Brandt; Danny Thomas	Allison	4:09
23.	"Meu Grande Amor (Si Tu M'Aimes)"	Allison; Fabian; Dudu Falcão	Allison; Pickell	4:53

== Production and Personnel (as adapted from liner notes) ==
- Tracks 1, 6 and 13 produced by Rick Allison; co-produced by Dave Pickell. Recorded by Jay Healy, Mario Brillion, Jeff Caruthers and John Kurlander; assisted by Ethan Shofer, Ian Dalsemer, Steve Baughman, Peter Doell, Dann Thompson, Andy Magnanello (Manganello on track 1 only) and David Channing (Channing on track 13 only). Mixed by Jay Healy, with assistance on track 6 by Gordon Fordyce. Rick Allison and Dave Pickell: Keyboards and Programming; Steve Lukather: Electric Guitars; Bruce Gaitsch: Acoustic and Nylon-String Guitars; Remy Malo: Bass; Mickey Curry: Drums
- Tracks 2, 3 and 10 produced by Patrick Leonard Technical assistant to Mr. Leonard: David Channing. Recorded by Ross Hogarth. Mixed by Mick Guzauski (track 2) and Mike Shipley (tracks 3 and 10). Patrick Leonard: Keyboards and Programming; James Harrah and David Channing (Channing on track 2 only): Electric Guitars; Dean Parks: Acoustic Guitars; Paul Bushnell: Bass; Vinnie Colaiuta: Drums; Luis Conte and Brian MacLeod (MacLeod also played drums on track 3): Percussion; Steven Tavaglione: Soprano Saxophone (track 2 only).
- Tracks 4, 7, 9 and 12 produced by Walter Afanasieff. Recorded by Dave Reitzas, David Gleeson and Bobbie Fernandez. Mixed by Mick Guzauski, with assistance by Tom Bender. Walter Afanasieff and Dan Shea: Keyboards, Drum and Rhythm Programming (note that track 12 features piano only); Michael Landau: Electric Guitars; Dean Parks: Acoustic Guitars
- Track 5 produced by Evan Rogers and Carl Sturken. Recorded by Al Hemberger; mixed by Mick Guzauski, with assistance by Tom Bender. Marc Antoine: Guitars; Carl Sturken: Guitars, Keyboards and Drum Programming
- Track 8 produced by Louis Biancaniello and Sam Watters. Recorded and mixed by Mick Guzauski, with assistance by Tom Bender. Louis Biancaniello: Keyboards and Programming; Chris Camozzi and Vernon "Ice" Black: Guitars
- Track 11 produced by Mark Taylor and Brian Rawling. Recorded by Mark Taylor and Glen Marchese. Mixed by Mark Taylor. Mark Taylor: Keyboards and programming.

== Charts ==
=== Weekly charts ===
Weekly chart performance for Lara Fabian
Chart (1999)	Peak position
Austrian Albums (Ö3 Austria)	24
Belgian Albums (Ultratop Flanders)	11
Belgian Albums (Ultratop Wallonia)	2
Dutch Albums (Album Top 100)	44
European Albums (Music & Media)	25
Finnish Albums (Suomen virallinen lista)	4
French Albums (SNEP)	1
German Albums (Offizielle Top 100)	26
New Zealand Albums (RMNZ)	34
Norwegian Albums (VG-lista)	3
Portuguese Albums (AFP)	1
Swedish Albums (Sverigetopplistan)	38
Swiss Albums (Schweizer Hitparade)	14
US Billboard 200	85

=== Year-end charts ===
Year-end chart performance for Lara Fabian
Chart (1999)	Position
French Albums (SNEP)	32

== Certifications ==
Certifications and sales for Lara Fabian
Region	Certification	Certified units/sales
Belgium (BRMA)	Platinum	50,000^{*}
Brazil (Pro-Música Brasil)	Platinum	250,000^{*}
Canada (Music Canada)	Gold	50,000^{^}
France (SNEP)	Platinum	300,000^{*}
Norway (IFPI Norway)	Gold	25,000^{*}
Switzerland (IFPI Switzerland)	Gold	25,000^{^}
^{*} Sales figures based on certification alone.^{^} Shipments figures based on certification alone.
