= Respect (Lisa M. album) =

Studio album by Lisa M
- Released: June 13, 2006
- Genre: Reggaeton
- Label: SONY BMG; White Lion Records
- Producer: Urba & Monserrate (Co-exec.); Nesty "La Mente Maestra"; Taino; Bones; Naldo; Lisa M

Lisa M chronology
| Y Sobreviví (1999) | Respect (2006) | Respect Deluxe Edition (2007) |

Singles from Respect
- 1. "hey Ladies" Released: 2006

Respect is an album by Puerto Rican reggaeton artist Lisa M, originally published in 2006.

The album includes hits such as "Hey Ladies", "Asi Es Que Eh", and "Fuego". The album features artists such as Julio Voltio, Moncho Rivera and Huracáne G, La Bruja K-Mil and MissWaidy. Urba y Monserrate co-produced the bulk of Respect, and were assisted by Nesty, Taino, Naldo, and Bones.

== Track listing ==
| # | Title | Performer(s) | Producer(s) | Length |
|---|---|---|---|---|
| 1 | "Intro" | Lisa M | Lisa M | 1:02 |
| 2 | "Fuego" | Lisa M | Urba & Monserrate | 2:56 |
| 3 | "Así Es Que Eh" | Lisa M featuring Hurricane G, La Bruja, K-Mil & Miss Waidy | Urba & Monserrate | 3:44 |
| 4 | "Hazme Tuya" | Lisa M | Urba & Monserrate | 3:40 |
| 5 | "Fuete" | Lisa M | Urba & Monserrate | 3:11 |
| 6 | "Hey Ladies" | Lisa M | Urba & Monserrate | 2:48 |
| 7 | "Tamo Encendío" | Lisa M featuring Julio Voltio | Nesty | 3:31 |
| 8 | "Guayando" | Lisa M | Bones | 2:52 |
| 9 | "Te Doy Pela" | Lisa M | Dj Giann, Dexter & Mista Greenzz | 3:26 |
| 10 | "Bacalao" | Lisa M | Naldo | 4:11 |
| 11 | "Quédate en Cuero" | Lisa M | Dj Giann, Dexter & Mista Greenzz | 3:39 |
| 12 | "Quítate" | Lisa M featuring Moncho Rivera | Lisa M & Taino | 4:00 |
| 13 | "Viciosa" | Lisa M | Dj Giann, Dexter & Mista Greenzz | 3:38 |
| 14 | "No Puedes" | Lisa M | Lisa M & Taino | 3:16 |
| 15 | "Pa' la Calle" | Lisa M | Lisa M & Taino | 3:03 |

== Deluxe edition ==
The Respect Deluxe Edition was released in 2007. It includes two new tracks "La Danza" and "Nadie Como Yo" featuring India. It also features two remixes of the songs "Bacaloa" and "Asi Es Que Eh".

=== Track listing ===
1. "La Danza" – 3:55
2. "Bacalao" (Remix Version)– 2:57
3. "Nadie Como Yo" –(Feat. India) 3:18
4. "Hey Ladies" - 2:47
5. "Quedate En Cuero" (Remix Version)– 3:34
6. "Quitate" - 4:00
7. "Hazme Tuya" - 3:40
8. "Asi Es Que Eh" (Remix Version)- (Feat. Hurricane G, La Bruja, K-Mil, and Miss Waidy) - 3:46
9. "Fuete" - 3:10
10. "Pa LA Calle" - 3:02
11. "Viciosa" - 3:38
12. "Fuego" - 2:57

== Videos ==
- "Hey Ladies"
- "Asi Es Que Eh" featuring Hurricane G, La Bruja, K-Mil, and Miss Waidy
