= Moacyr de Góes =

Brazilian writer and educator

- Born: Moacyr de Góes; August 1930; Natal, Rio Grande do Norte, Brazil
- Died: 27 March 2009 (aged 78); Rio de Janeiro, Brazil
- Occupations: Writer, educator
- Children: 2, Moacyr and Leon

Moacyr de Góes (August 1930 – 27 March 2009) was a Brazilian writer and educator. He became well known for his work as Natal's Education Secretary during the mayoralty of Djalma Maranhão in 1964.

== Biography ==
As a writer and educator, Góes participated in the movement to increase literacy rates, specifically with the "De Pé no Chão Também se Aprende a Ler" campaign. Despite the project having benefitted more than 40,000 people, he was removed from the position and from public office after the 1964 Brazilian coup d'état. Soon after, he was imprisoned by the military dictatorship, accused of being subversive.

After being granted amnesty in 1979, he retired from being a professor at the Federal University of Rio Grande do Norte (UFRN), being then transferred and becoming a faculty member of the Federal University of Rio de Janeiro (UFRJ) during the rectorship of Adolfo Polilo.

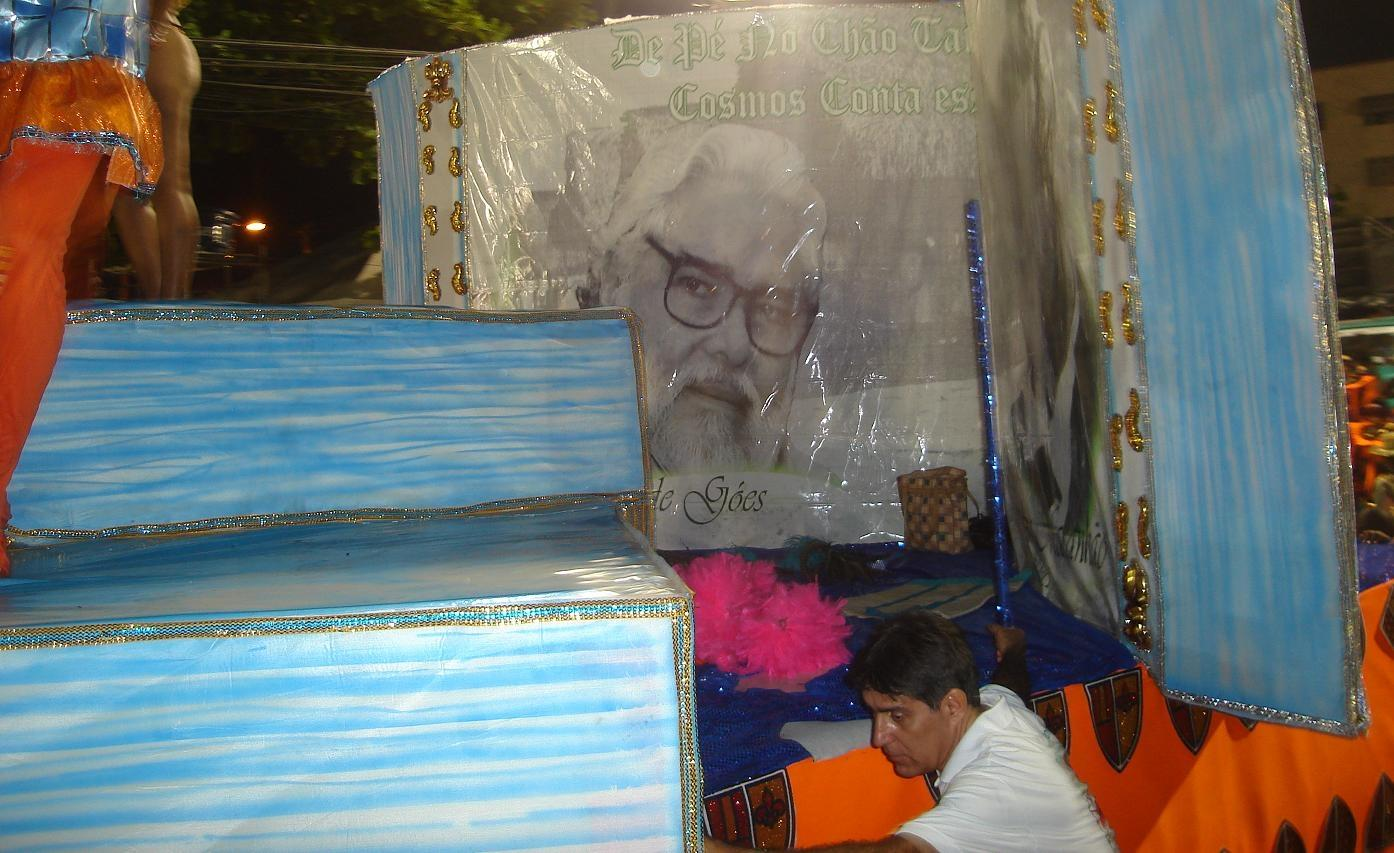
Drawing in tribute to Moacyr de Goés, during the 2010 Rio Carnaval.

Góes died on 27 March 2009 at 78 years old due to cancer, which he had already been fighting for three years. He is survived by his sons, screenwriter and director Moacyr Góes and actor Leon Góes.

In 2010, he was paid tribute to in the samba-enredo "De pé no chão também se aprende a ler, Cosmos conta essa história popular", by the Rio de Janeiro-based samba school Unidos de Cosmos.
