= Tainá 2: A New Amazon Adventure =

2004 film directed by Mauro Lima

- Theatrical release poster
- Directed by: Mauro Lima
- Written by: Claudia Levay
- Produced by: Pedro Carlos Rovai
- Starring: Eunice Baía; Chris Couto; Kadu Moliterno; Vitor Morosini; Arilene Rodrigues
- Cinematography: Ulrich Burtin
- Edited by: Diana Vasconcellos
- Music by: Luiz Avellar
- Production companies: Columbia Pictures; Globo Filmes; Tietê Produções Cinematográficas; Lereby Produções
- Distributed by: Columbia TriStar Film Distributors International
- Release dates: October 24, 2004 (Chicago); January 7, 2005 (Brazil)
- Running time: 76 minutes
- Country: Brazil
- Language: Portuguese
- Budget: R$5.8 million
- Box office: R$4,612,264

Tainá 2: A New Amazon Adventure (Portuguese: Tainá 2: A Aventura Continua) is a 2004 Brazilian film directed by Mauro Lima. It is the second film in Tainá film series and a sequel to Tainá: An Adventure in the Amazon.

It was shot in Manaus, the capital of the state of Amazonas, and also in Ubatuba, São Paulo, where Amazônia was simulated in close-ups. A prequel, Tainá 3: The Origin, was released in 2011.

== Plot ==
The evil woman Zuzu gets these two men to go to the jungle and take the animals and this little amazon jungle girl Tainá have to rescue the animals. The men shot the mother of the cute little jungle cat, and the jungle cat was only a little baby and it got very sad.

Carlito, a young boy helps Taina rescue animals from evil woman. Carlito has lost his puppy and he's looking for it, but Catiti found it.

== Cast ==
- Eunice Baía as Tainá
- Chris Couto as Zuzu
- Kadu Moliterno as Gaspar
- Vitor Morosini as Carlitos
- Arilene Rodrigues as Catiti
- Leandro Hassum as Zé Grilo
- Aramis Trindade as Lacraia
- Roney Villela as Carcará
- Ruy Polanah as Tigê
- Daniel Munduruku as Pajé Tatu Pituna
- Orlando Drummond as Ludo, the parrot (voice)
