= Alecrim Cemetery =

Brazilian public cemetery

Cemitério do Alecrim (Alecrim Cemetery)
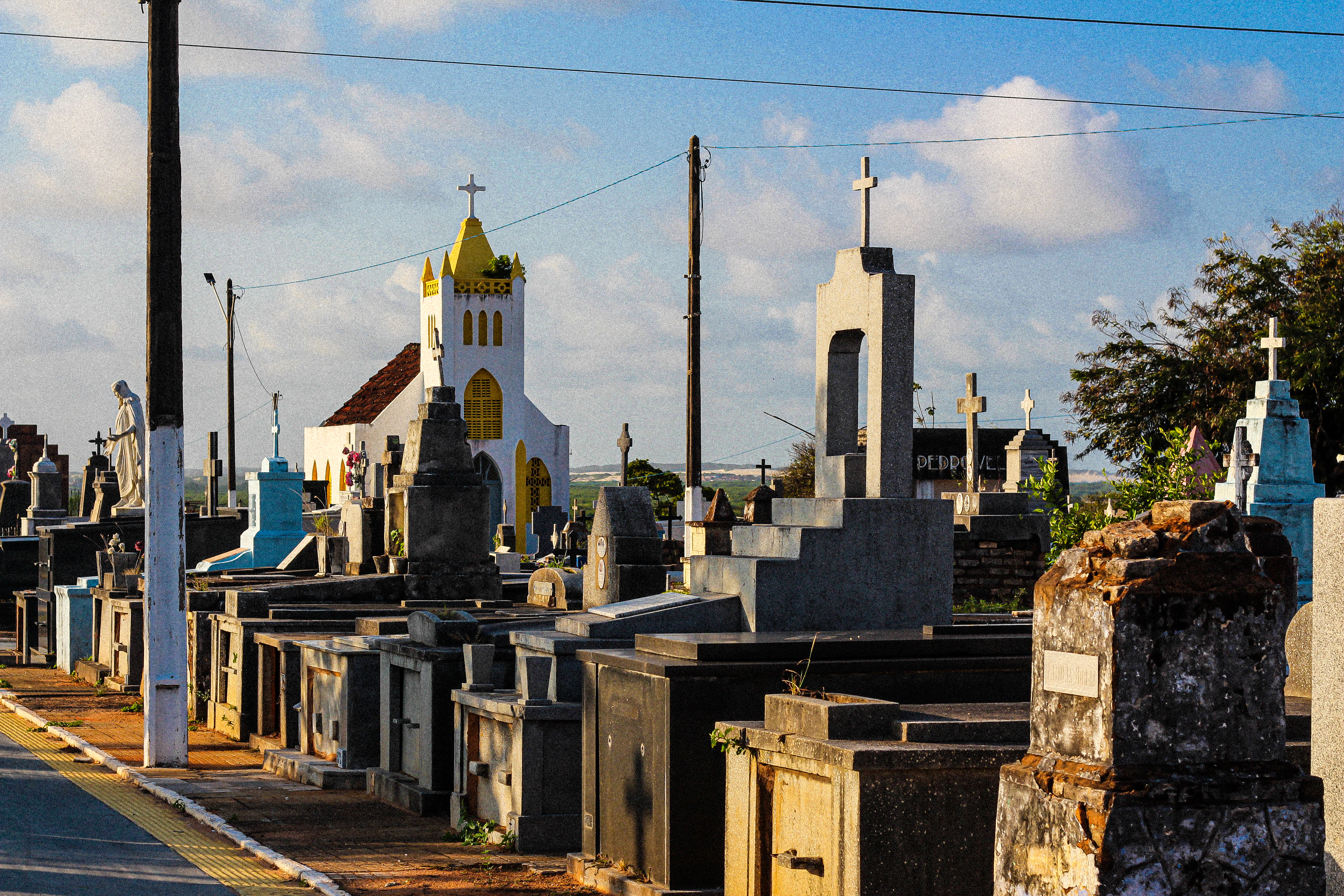
- Chapel of Alecrim Cemetery
- Interactive map of Cemitério do Alecrim (Alecrim Cemetery)

Details
- Established: November 24, 1956; 69 years ago
- Location: Natal, Rio Grande do Norte
- Country: Brazil
- Coordinates: 5°47′30.786″S 35°12′51.332″W
- Owned by: Prefeitura de Natal

Alecrim Cemetery (Cemitério do Alecrim) is a public cemetery in Natal, Brazil, located in the district of Alecrim. It was established on November 24, 1856, and was the first public cemetery built in the city. The need for a cemetery was identified by the City, through Resolution 323, on August 2, 1855, following outbreaks of smallpox, yellow fever and cholera. It was originally known as Natal Cemetery. Historian Luís da Câmara Cascudo in his book, História da Cidade do Natal, refers to two potential origins of the name, Alecrim. The first refers to locals who had the habit of decorating the front of their houses with rosemary. The second relates to a local resident who used to decorate children's coffins with branches of rosemary.

The Alecrim Cemetery is identified as part of Natal's Historical and Cultural Heritage and was officially recognized in 2011 by Decree No. 9,541 of the Municipal Council of Culture.

The cemetery includes the graves of several notable people with ties to the community, including:

- Juvino Barreto, pioneering industrialist
- Pedro Velho, politician, journalist, and founder of the newspaper, A República
- Henrique Castriciano, poet
- Câmara Cascudo, historian
- Café Filho, 18th president of Brazil (1954-55)
- Luiz Gonzaga, soldier killed in the Communist Intentona
- Djalma Maranhão, mayor of Natal (1956-59, and 1961-64)
