= Adassa (album) =

Studio album by Adassa
- Released: April 24, 2007
- Recorded: 2006–2007
- Genres: R&B, reggaeton
- Label: Universal Music Latino
- Producers: Victor De La Cruz, Mystico, Zack Ziskin, Echo, Steven Cruz, Eddie Perez, Don Candiani & Diesel

Adassa chronology
Kamasutra (2005)	Adassa (2007)

Singles from Adassa
- 1. "La Manera" Released: 2007; 2. "No Me Compares" Released: 2007

Adassa is the self-titled third studio album by Colombian-American reggaeton singer-songwriter Adassa. It was released on April 24, 2007.

== Track listing ==
#	Title	Featuring	Producer(s)	Length
1	"La Manera"		Don Candiani	3:31
2	"Perder el Control"		Don Candiani	3:35
3	"Pa' La Písta"	Mach & Daddy	Don Candiani & Machore	3:39
4	"Suéltate"	RKM & Ken-Y & Cruzito	RKM & Ken-Y & Cruzito	3:46
5	"You Got Me"	Wayne Wonder	Don Candiani	3:05
6	"Ya Me Cansé"	Jimmy Flavor	Echo & Jimmy Flavor	3:45
7	"Si Tú Quíeres"	Kay Bizzy	Don Candiani & Bizzy	4:09
8	"Mejor Que Tú"		Don Candiani	3:45
9	"Snap"	J. Dundas	Don Candiani & J. Dundas	3:37
10	"A Lil Freaky"		Don Candiani	3:58
11	"Kissing Friends"		Don Candiani	3:40
12	"No Me Compares"		Don Candiani	3:42
13	"It's Alright"			3:44
14	"Amame"		Don Candiani	3:21
15	"We Belong Together"		Austin, Bristol, Carey, Dupri, Edmonds, Johnson, Moten, Seal, Sully, Womack	4:07
16	"No Me Compares (Scarlito Remix)"		Don Candiani	3:50

== See also ==
- Reggaeton
