= Luiz Carlos Tourinho =

Brazilian actor

- Born: Luiz Carlos de Castro Tourinho Filho; 16 May 1964; Niterói, Rio de Janeiro, Brazil
- Died: 21 January 2008 (aged 43); Niterói, Rio de Janeiro, Brazil
- Occupations: Actor and comedian
- Known for: Piu Piu

Luiz Carlos de Castro Tourinho Filho (16 May 1964 in Niterói – 21 January 2008 in Niterói) was a Brazilian actor.

Tourinho gained notoriety on TV with the role of Franco in the series Sob Nova Direção, in which he played opposite actresses Ingrid Guimarães and Heloísa Périssé.

He died of a cerebral aneurysm at the age of 43 after being rushed to the Hospital de Clínicas de Niterói in Niterói, Brazil.

== Filmography ==
=== Film ===
- 1988: Super Xuxa contra Baixo Astral - Pássaro-gente Tic
- 1990: Assim na Tela Como no Céu - Lúcifer Júnior
- 1995: Era Uma Vez... - Banshee
- 1997: For All - O Trampolim da Vitória - Sandoval
- 2000: Tainá: An Adventure in the Amazon - Smith
- 2002: Xuxa e os Duendes 2: No Caminho das Fadas - Chuchu
- 2004: Xuxa e o Tesouro da Cidade Perdida - Curupira

=== Television ===
- 1984: A Principal causa do Divórcio (Caso Verdade)
- 1989: O Cometa - Miguel
- 1990: Escolinha do Professor Raimundo - Pedro Vaz Caminha
- 1993: Você Decide - "Sinuca de Bico"
- 1996-1997: Chico Total
- 1996: Caça Talentos - Fred
- 1999: Suave Veneno - Edilberto
- 2000: Sai de Baixo - Ataíde
- 2001: Gente Inocente
- 2003: Xuxa no Mundo da Imaginação
- 2003: Kubanacan - Jack Everest
- 2003-2004: Sob Nova Direção - Franco
- 2003: Sítio do Picapau Amarelo - Mefisto
- 2005-2007: Sob Nova Direção - Franco
- 2007-2008: Desejo Proibido - Nezinho (final appearance)
