= Adassa =

American singer and songwriter

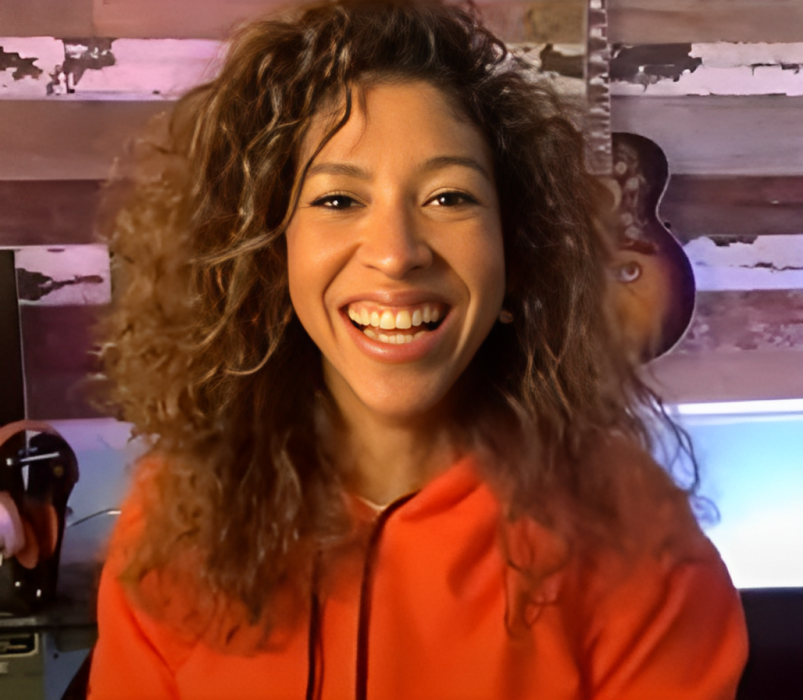
- Adassa in November 2021

Background information
- Born: Hadassa Nohemi Candiani; February 5, 1987 (age 39); Miami, Florida, U.S.
- Origin: St. Croix, U.S. Virgin Islands
- Genres: Reggaeton; urban; pop
- Occupations: Singer; songwriter
- Years active: 2004–present
- Label: Universal Music Latino
- Website: adassa-official.com

Hadassa Nohemi Candiani (born February 5, 1987), known professionally as Adassa, is an American urban reggaeton singer and songwriter. She is known for her Latin-infused dance-pop music and has released several albums throughout her career, including "Kamasutra" and "Adassa." Her music career spans from urban reggaeton to Christian music.

Adassa has also worked in the entertainment industry as a voice actress, including her role as the character Dolores Madrigal in the Disney film Encanto. She received nominations for Collaboration of the Year and Favorite Pop Song at the 2022 American Music Awards for her work on the viral hit song "We Don't Talk About Bruno" from the film's soundtrack.

Adassa also performed the National Anthem at the Homestead Miami Speedway for the Dixie Vodka 400 NASCAR.

== Early life ==
Adassa was born in Miami, Florida, and raised in St. Croix, Virgin Islands, by her Colombian parents.

== Career ==
She has toured and collaborated with artists such as Daddy Yankee, Lil' Flip, Pitbull, Taino, Ivy Queen, Don Omar, Lil Jon, Kevin Lyttle, Vico C, Baby Rasta & Gringo, R.K.M & Ken-Y, Wisin & Yandel, Sasha, Baby Bash and Juvenile among others.

She also made high-profile cameo appearances with Ciara and Missy Elliott on "1, 2 Step" (Don Candiani Reggaetón Remix), with Pitbull on the title track record off of her second album Kamasutra, and alongside Tego Calderón and Roselyn Sánchez.

She was also successful in Europe with the song "Bounce" (duet with the Turkish pop star Tarkan).

Her 2005 single "De Tra" reached No. 40 on Billboard Latin Tropical Airplay chart. Adassa's singles "Dancing Alone" & "Little White Lies", held top positions on the German dance charts in early 2013.

She made her acting debut in the Disney animated feature film Encanto as the voice of Dolores Madrigal. The following year, she acted in season 2 of Around the Sun, an episodic audio drama.

== Discography ==
=== Albums ===
- 2004: On the Floor
- 2005: Kamasutra
- 2007: Adassa

=== Singles ===
List of other charted songs, with year released, selected chart positions, certifications, and album name shown
Title	Year	Peak chart positions		Album
Title	Year	US Latin Rhythm	US Tropical	Album
"On the Floor"	2004	—	—	On the Floor
"De Tra" (feat. Taino)	2005	36	40	Kamasutra
"Dejare de Quererte"	2005	—	—	Kamasutra
"Kamasutra" (feat. Pitbull)	2006	29	—	Kamasutra
"La Manera"	2007	31	—	Adassa
"No Me Compares"	2007	—	—	Adassa
"All I Wanna Do"	2008	—	—	Non-album singles
"Sexy (Dance Remix)"	2008	—	—	Non-album singles
"Backfire"	2014	—	—	Non-album singles
"Loca!" (feat. Pitbull)	2017	—	—	Non-album singles
"Blanca Navidad" (Hilda Lamas feat. Adassa)	2021	—	—	Non-album singles
"Ni Un Beso"	2021	—	—	Non-album singles
"—" denotes songs which were not released in that country or did not chart.

=== Other charted songs ===
List of other charted songs, with year released, selected chart positions, and album name shown
Title	Year	Peak chart positions										Certifications	Album
Title	Year	US	AUS	CAN	GER	IRE	NLD	NZ	SWE	UK	WW	Certifications	Album
"We Don't Talk About Bruno" (with Carolina Gaitán, Mauro Castillo, Rhenzy Feliz, Diane Guerrero, and Stephanie Beatriz	2021	1	5	3	71	1	41	4	40	1	1	RIAA: 2× Platinum; ARIA: Platinum; BPI: 2× Platinum; MC: Gold	Encanto
"All of You" (with Stephanie Beatriz, Olga Merediz, John Leguizamo, Maluma, and Encanto cast)	2021	71	—	83	—	—	—	—	—	—	111		Encanto
"—" denotes songs which were not released in that country or did not chart.

== Filmography ==
=== Film ===
Year	Title	Role	Notes
2021	Encanto	Dolores Madrigal (voice)	Core cast.

==== Television ====
Year	Title	Role	Notes
TBA	Unnamed Pet Resort Project	Ten (voice)	Animated series, Main role.
