= Djalma Maranhão =

Brazilian politician

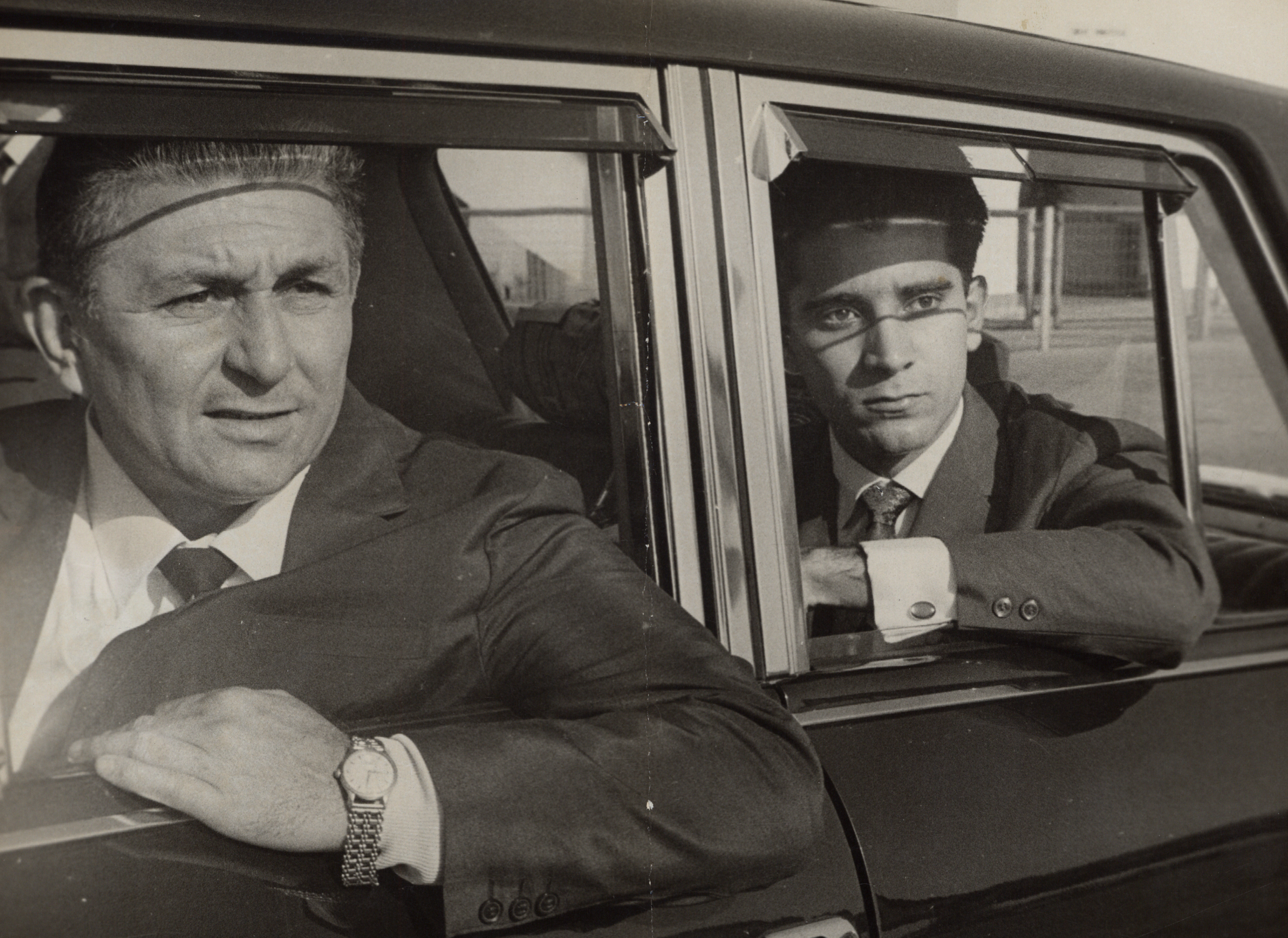
- Djalma Maranhão (left) and Jorge Rodrigues

Mayor of Natal
- In office 1 January 1964 – 3 April 1964
- Preceded by: José Pinto Freire
- Succeeded by: Tertius Rebelo
- In office 8 April 1956 – 8 April 1959
- Preceded by: Wilson de Oliveira Miranda
- Succeeded by: José Pinto Freire

Personal details
- Born: 27 November 1915 Natal, Rio Grande do Norte, Brazil
- Died: 30 July 1971 (aged 55) Montevideo, Uruguay
- Political party: PCB; PSB; PDS

Djalma Maranhão (27 November 1915 – 30 July 1971) was a Brazilian politician. He was the mayor of the city of Natal for two terms, from 1956 to 1959, and again from 1961 to 1964. He also was a state deputy in and federal deputy from the state of Rio Grande do Norte. He was the first democratically elected mayor of Natal, as well as the last before the Brazilian military dictatorship.

== Biography ==
Maranhão was born on 27 November 1915 in Natal. Prior to his political career he was also a physical education teacher and a journalist. He was a founder and director of local newspapers. His brother was lawyer and Communist activist Luiz Ignácio Maranhão Filho, who had been forcibly disappeared and murdered by the Brazilian military dictatorship after it came into power in 1964.

Maranhão was a member of the Brazilian Communist Party until the beginning of the 1940s. Afterwards, he became a member of the National Labour Party (PTN) and later the Brazilian Socialist Party (PSB).

He was elected a state deputy in 1954. He assumed a seat in the Federal Chamber of Deputies as a first substitute from 1959 to 1960. His first term as mayor of Natal came in the mid-1950s after being nominated by governor Dinarte Mariz. He was elected by direct vote to his second mandate in 1960, the first direct vote for mayor in Natal. During his time in office, he had enlisted Moacyr de Góes to help expand literacy rates in the city to considerable success.

Considered to be left-wing, after the coup d'état in April 1964, Maranhão was removed from office as mayor. He was imprisoned by the military on the island of Fernando de Noronha and in Recife. He was freed after a habeas corpus order by the Supreme Federal Court in December 1964, and afterwards went into exile in Uruguay. He died while in exile in Uruguay at 55 years old. His corpse was repatriated and was buried at Cemitério do Alecrim in Natal.

There is a bust of Maranhão in front of the Padre Miguelinho Palace in Natal.
