= Yo soy Boricua, pa'que tu lo sepas! =

1995 song by Joel Bosch

"Yo Soy Boricua, Pa' Que Tu Lo sepas!" (English: I am Puerto Rican, so that you know!) is a song composed in 1995 by Joel Bosch or (Bosh) a.k.a. Taino. The song was born out of a moment of frustration and pride, as Taino overheard an engineer insulting Puerto Ricans in English during a recording session. In response, Taino wrote the chorus "Yo soy Boricua, Pa' Que Tu Lo Sepas" ("I am Puerto Rican, so that you know it") on a piece of paper and quickly turned it into a full song, hoping to assert his identity and defend his culture. Since then, "Yo soy Boricua, Pa' Que Tu Lo Sepas" has become a beloved anthem for Puerto Ricans worldwide, representing a statement of social and cultural identity and pride.

"Yo soy Boricua, Pa' Que Tu Lo Sepas" has been chanted by many Puerto Ricans around the world, at specific events. It has been chanted at the Puerto Rican Day Parade held in New York City The Desfile Puertorriqueño de Florida protests sporting events and political events. In December 2022, the phrase of the song was cited by Congresswoman Alexandria Ocasio-Cortez during a discussion on the Puerto Rico Status Act, marking the first time it was entered into the Congressional Record. This historical reference highlights the significance of the song as a symbol of Puerto Rican culture and identity. The song has been widely recognized as a symbol of Puerto Rican identity and pride, and has been covered by various artists throughout the years. In 2019, Taino released a compilation EP album, Titled "Yo Soy Boricua Pa' Que Tu Lo Sepas," featuring new and remixed versions of the song

== Legal ==
Joel Bosch, also known as Taino, holds the US Copyright for the song and a valid trademark for the phrase "Yo Soy Boricua, Pa' Que Tu Lo Sepas." In 2018, there were several legal cases where Bosch alleged that companies like Sony Music, T-Mobile, Coca Cola, and Popular Inc infringed on his copyright by using the song in their products without permission. All cases were settled out of court amicably. In the case of Popular Inc., they acknowledged Joel Bosch's authorship and the use of the song in the special "Que lindo es Puerto Rico" by Pirulo and la Tribu e Ismael Miranda, following an amicable settlement.

== Album and compilations ==
- Con Mi Corona (Released) 1995
- Latin House Jam (Released) August 4, 1998
- El Conteo Final (Released) November 22, 2002
- Reggaeton en la Parada Puertorriqueña, Vol. 2 (Released) June 7, 2005
- Yo Soy Boricua, Pa' Que Tu Lo Sepas (Released) September 12, 2019 [EP] [Digital]
- Yo Soy Boricua, Pa’ Que Tu Lo Sepas Vol. 2 (Released) 2024

Note: The Song "Yo Soy Boricua, Pa' Que Tu Lo Sepas" appears on all these albums and various artist compilations mentioned above
