= I Am Who I Am (Lara Fabian song) =

2000 single by Lara Fabian

Single by Lara Fabian

from the album Lara Fabian
- Released: September 18, 2000
- Recorded: 1999–2000
- Genre: Dance-pop
- Length: 3:47
- Songwriter(s): Lara Fabian; Rick Allison; Evan Rogers; Carl Sturken
- Producer(s): Carl Sturken and Evan Rogers

Lara Fabian singles chronology
"I Will Love Again" (2000)	"I Am Who I Am" (2000)	"Love By Grace" (2001)

"I Am Who I Am" is a song recorded by the Belgian-Canadian singer Lara Fabian for her English-debut self-titled studio album. It was written by Fabian and Rick Allison with its producers Carl Sturken and Evan Rogers. The dance-pop empowering song was released as the third single from the album on September 18, 2000. It received generally favorable reviews, with praise going for its catchiness and "self-empowering" lyrics, though it was considered forgettable by a few.

A music video for the song was directed by Paul Boyd and released around the same time of its release. The song was performed on her TV special From Lara with Love, as well as European TV shows such as Vivement Dimanche and Interaktiv. It charted inside the top-twenty in Canada, as well as the lower-regions of France, Germany and Switzerland charts.

== Background and release ==
With the two-year absence from music by the Canadian singer Céline Dion, record label Sony Music expressed the desire to sign with the Belgian-Italian singer Lara Fabian to record her first English album, since both are considered power ballad singers. To ensure the success of the record, her label, Columbia Records, teamed her with prominent industry names like Walter Afanasieff and Patrick Leonard, and she began recording the album. A songwriter, Fabian was involved in co-writing 90% of it, claiming: "There are a lot of different things on the record, but the common denominator is that they all represent who I am. I was challenged on this album, and as a result there was a lot of evolution going on. That’s what I want people to be left with—it’s all me." As noted by Billboard's Chuck Taylor, "the set comprises 13 songs focusing on personal strength and the stages of love, replete with heart-plucking ballads and a handful of manic dance cuts." Following the success of "I Will Love Again", "I Am Who I Am" was released as the second single from the album (and third overall) on September 18, 2000. Its CD single included four remixes of the track and the song "Before We Say Goodbye". It later impacted Germany radio stations on September 23, 2000.

== Composition and lyrics ==
"I Am Who I Am" was written by Lara Fabian, Rick Allison with American duo Carl Sturken and Evan Rogers, who also handled the production of the track. Sturken was also responsible for guitars (with the help from Marc Antoine), keyboards and drum programming. Rogers, on the other hand, provided background vocals alongside Fabian, Ada Dyer and Audrey Wheeler. The song was mixed by Mick Guzauski at Barking Doctor Recording in Mount Kisco Studio, New York, whilst Fabian recorded the song at The Loft Recording Studios in Bronxville, New York. Sturken & Rogers were enlisted to work with Fabian and on a Gavin Report article said the following about working with her on "I Am Who I Am": "Lara's voice is an amazing instrument. At times she stood six feet away from the microphone and still perfectly placed her voice in the track. Lara's passion for her music is contagious and we were honored to work with her." "I Am Who I Am" is a dance-pop empowering song that was defined by Fabian as "the album's anthem".

== Critical reception ==
Reception towards the track was generally favorable. Annette M. Lai, writing for Gavin Report, picked the song as one of her favorites from the album, naming it "forthright". Taiwanese film & entertainment magazine World Screen Magazine was also positive, calling it a "powerful anthem", while Michael Paoletta from Billboard referred it as one of the songs not to be missed from the album, defining it as a "self-empowering" song. The Dooyoo review was more mixed. Although the song was called "reasonably catchy", it was also considered "not particularly memorable" and not "a great introduction to Fabian's true vocal abilities," being rated 6 out of 10. Writing for Amazon, Courtney Kemp declared the song has Fabian acting as a "tough cookie", and though not too convincing, in her own words, she "belt[s] her heart out nonetheless."

Commercially, "I Am Who I Am" debuted straight at number 19 on the Canadian Singles Chart, becoming Fabian's second top-twenty single. It charted in some European countries as well, peaking at numbers sixty-four, sixty-seven and seventy in Switzerland, France, and Germany, respectively. As stated by Tori Hartshorn of Broadway World, the HQ2 remix was considered an "underground club hit."

== Track listing ==
European & Australian CD single

1. I Am Who I Am (Chris Lord-Alge remix) - 3:53
2. I Am Who I Am (HQ2 radio mix) - 3:28
3. I Am Who I Am (Bastone and Bernstein radio edit) - 3:31
4. I Am Who I Am (Major Tom version) - 3:39
5. Before We Say Goodbye - 4:25

== Music video ==
A music video for the song was directed by Paul Boyd and was released to music channels across Europe. "I Am Who I Am" was promoted through live performances on Fabian's PBS special "From Lara with Love", Vivement Dimanche in France, and Interaktiv.

== Charts ==
Chart (2000)	Peak position
Canadian Singles Chart (Billboard)	19
France (SNEP)	67
Germany (GfK)	70
Switzerland (Schweizer Hitparade)	64

== Release history ==
Release dates and formats for "I Am Who I Am"
Region	Date	Format	Label	Ref.
Europe	September 18, 2000	CD single	Sony Music	
Germany	September 23, 2000	Airplay	Sony Music	
