= Moacyr Góes =

Brazilian screenwriter and film and theatre director

- Born: Moacyr de Góes Filho; 23 October 1961 (age 63); Natal, Rio Grande do Norte, Brazil
- Occupation(s): Screenwriter, film and theatre director
- Years active: 1999–present
- Father: Moacyr de Góes
- Relatives: Leon Góes (brother)

Moacyr Góes (born 23 October 1961) is a Brazilian screenwriter and film and theatre director.

== Biography ==
Góes was born on 23 October 1961 in Natal. He is the son of educator and historian Moacyr de Góes and brother of actor Leon Góes.

He graduated from the University of Rio de Janeiro (Uni-Rio) with a degree in theatre directing. Beginning with directing plays for the youth, he would go on direct plays such as Noseferatu and the Georg Büchner Woyzeck. In 1988, he founded the Companhia de Encenação Teatral. In 1998, he transferred over to Teatro Carlos Gomes. He later transitioned to directing films and television, including Laços de Família and several movies by Xuxa.

== Filmography ==
=== As director ===
- 2003 - Dom
- 2003 - Maria - Mãe do Filho de Deus
- 2003 - Xuxa Abracadabra
- 2004 - Um Show de Verão
- 2004 - Irmãos de Fé
- 2004 - Xuxa e o Tesouro da Cidade Perdida
- 2005 - Xuxinha e Guto contra os Monstros do Espaço
- 2006 - Trair e Coçar É só Começar
- 2007 - O Homem Que Desafiou o Diabo
- 2009 - Destino
- 2013 - Bonitinha, mas Ordinária
- 2017 - Gabeira (documentary)

=== As screenwriter ===
- 2003 - Dom
- 2003 - Maria - Mãe do Filho de Deus
- 2004 - Irmãos de Fé
- 2007 - O Homem Que Desafiou o Diabo

== Television ==
=== As director ===
- 1999 - Suave Veneno
- 2000 - Laços de Família

== Theatre ==
- 1994 - Peer Gynt. Debuted at Teatro Glória (Rio de Janeiro) in April 1994 with production by the municipality of Rio de Janeiro and the Municipal Secretary of Culture, directed by Góes. Cast included José Mayer, Ivone Hoffman, Patrícia França, Letícia Spiller, Marília Pêra, Paula Lavigne, Ítalo Rossi, and Floriano Peixoto.
