= Tainá 3: The Origin =

2011 film directed by Rosane Svartman

- Directed by: Rosane Svartman
- Produced by: Pedro Carlos Rovai
- Starring: Wiranu Tembé; Mayara Bentes; Guilherme Berenguer; Leon Góes; Gracindo Júnior; Nuno Leal Maia
- Cinematography: Dudu Miranda
- Edited by: Natara Ney
- Music by: Mu Carvalho
- Production companies: Globo Filmes; Sincrocine Produções Cinematográficas
- Distributed by: Columbia Pictures (through Sony Pictures Releasing International)
- Release dates: July 3, 2011 (Festival do Rio BR); February 8, 2013
- Running time: 80 minutes
- Country: Brazil
- Language: Portuguese
- Budget: R$ 10 million

Tainá 3: The Origin (Portuguese: Tainá 3 – A Origem) is a 2011 Brazilian film directed by Rosane Svartman. It is the third film and final installment of the Tainá series, and the prequel to Tainá: An Adventure in the Amazon and Tainá 2: A New Amazon Adventure.

The film follows the story of Tainá, a 5-year-old native orphan girl who dreams to become a warrior and find her true origin.

== Plot ==
The Amazon rainforest is invaded by pirates and a native girl named Maya ends up becoming a victim of bandits, leaving her baby Tainá orphaned. The child is sheltered between the roots of a great tree and rescued by the lonely old shaman Tigê, who takes care of her and only returns to his people five years later, when the new leader will be chosen as the defender of nature. As a girl, Tainá is prevented from presenting herself, but the legacy of her mother, the last of the warriors, and with the support of the smart city girl Laurinha and the native Gobi, she decides to face the evildoers, unraveling the mystery of his own origins.

== Production ==
=== Development ===
Filming took place between July and August 2010.

The production involved more than 100 professionals, including technicians and Brazilian artists who were immersed in the jungles of Pará and Amapá.

The city of Santarém and the regions of Alter do Chão, Flona Tapajós and Ilha de Santana were used as filming location.

=== Casting ===
For the selection of the main character, Tainá, production ran about 40 villages in the Amazon for two years and photographed about three thousand children. After screening, 10 were chosen for the selection of a winner.

The final process of selection involved the participation of the public who voted online and via SMS.

The actress chosen to live Tainá was the little Wiranu Tembe, a native girl with just five years, member of the village Tekohaw in Pará.

Wiranu didn't speak a word of Portuguese before being discovered by the team of the film.
