= Laços de Família =

Brazilian telenovela

- Genre: Telenovela; Family drama; Slice of life
- Created by: Manoel Carlos
- Written by: Manoel Carlos; Maria Carolina; Vinícius Vianna; Flávia Lins e Silva; Fausto Galvão
- Directed by: Moacyr Góes; Leandro Neri; Ricardo Waddington; Rogério Gomes; Marcos Schechtman
- Starring: Vera Fischer; Tony Ramos; Carolina Dieckmann; Reynaldo Gianecchini; Deborah Secco; Marieta Severo; José Mayer; Helena Ranaldi; Alexandre Borges; Giovanna Antonelli; Luigi Baricelli; Regiane Alves; Soraya Ravenle; José Victor Castiel; Lília Cabral; Leonardo Villar; Walderez de Barros
- Theme music composer: Tom Jobim
- Opening theme: "Corcovado" by Astrud Gilberto, Tom Jobim, João Gilberto & Stan Getz
- Composer: Alberto Rosenblit
- Country of origin: Brazil
- Original language: Portuguese
- No. of episodes: 209

Production
- Producer: Ruy Mattos
- Production locations: Rio de Janeiro, Brazil; Camaquã, Rio Grande do Sul, Brazil; Nikkō, Tochigi, Japan; Kyoto, Japan; Tokyo, Japan
- Cinematography: Elton Menezes
- Editors: Carlos Thadeu; César Chaves; Gilson Câmara
- Camera setup: Multi-camera
- Running time: 30–78 minutes

Original release
- Network: TV Globo
- Release: 5 June 2000 – 2 February 2001

Laços de Família (English: Family Ties) is a Brazilian telenovela produced and aired by TV Globo from 5 June 2000 to 3 February 2001. With a total of 209 episodes, it was created by Manoel Carlos and written by him with Maria Carolina, Vinícius Vianna, Flávia Lins e Silva and Fausto Galvão, and directed by Moacyr Góes, Leandro Neri, Ricardo Waddington, Rogério Gomes and Marcos Schechtman.

It stars Vera Fischer, Carolina Dieckmann, Reynaldo Gianecchini, Marieta Severo, José Mayer, Tony Ramos, Deborah Secco, and Lília Cabral.

== Synopsis ==
Helena, a businesswoman aged 45 who lives in the neighbourhood of Leblon and owns a beauty clinic. She is involved in a car accident with Edu, a 25-year-old doctor who had just graduated, in front of the bookstore owned by Miguel, on the eve of New Year 2000. When taken by Edu to the bookstore to be attended to by first aid, she arouses the love of Miguel.

Miguel is a widower who leads a quiet life with his two children. The feisty and rebellious Ciça, the youngest of the two, objects to all actions taken by her father and, while being quite immature, she loves her family and is often seen taking care of both her father and her brother. Paulo, the elder sibling, has a severe neurological disability due to a car crash that killed his mother. He follows treatment with the physical therapist Isabel, who is secretly in love with him. But Capitu has his full attention.

Edu and Helena soon become involved in a controversial love story. They are stigmatized by members of the family because of the wide age gap (20 years) between Helena and Edu. The main obstacle is Alma Flora, Edu's overprotective aunt, who tries to keep her nephew away from Helena. Being unable to have children, Alma takes care of Edu and his sister Estella as her own, often interfering heavily in the personal lives of the siblings. She also manages the family's fortune and a farm, which they inherited after the death of Edu and Estella's parents. The members of Alma's family live in a mansion in the neighborhood of Barra da Tijuca, along with Danilo, Alma's fourth husband. Danilo is portrayed as a bon vivant and quite a womanizer, repeatedly attempting to seduce Rita, the housemaid. Rodrigo is in love with Alma and dreams of being her fifth husband.

The farms owned are attended to by Pedro, an arrogant, tough, and nasty womanizer who has a passion for horses. In the past, he was romantically involved with his cousin, a young Helena. Today, he is married to the florist Sylvia. After several bouts of jealousy, he gradually loosens his ties with Sylvia. He gets to know the new veterinary, Cíntia, and after many conflicts between the two, he begins to like her.

Helena has two children. Fred, the eldest, is an unemployed engineer. His wife is Clara, a rich girl who married young and cannot adapt to a life of financial difficulties. The two have a daughter, Nina, who provides an excuse for Clara to convince Fred to rent an expensive apartment for only three, when they could have been living with Fred's mother, Helena. Helena's youngest child is Camila, a Literature student at Oxford, England. She meets Edu on a trip to Japan, while the young man is visiting the country with Helena. On her return to Brazil, she develops a strong bond of friendship with Edu, since the two are similar in age and tastes.

Later, Camila and Edu realize they are in love with each other. Both try to resist out of respect for Helena. The latter progressively realizes that her boyfriend has been seduced by her own daughter. Furthermore, Edu's aunt Alma dislikes Helena and does everything to catalyze the romance between Camila and Edu. After many discussions and quarrels, Helena breaks away from him so that Edu and Camila can enjoy their love story to the fullest. Discovering that Helena is single, Miguel decides to conquer her and successfully does so.

One character who does not welcome the relationship between Camila and Edu is Iris, the half-sister of Helena. Their father is the old Aléssio, who is married to Ingrid, Iris's mother. Iris moves to Rio de Janeiro to live with Helena after the death of her mother, shot in a gas station while trying to save her daughter from a thief. Iris claims that Helena's daughter, Camila, "stole" her mother's boyfriend, and she tries many tricks to try to split them. Iris herself is in love with Pedro, who sees her as a spoiled little girl. Her rival is Cintia, to whom Pedro is physically attracted. Iris tries to separate the couple through several schemes. She manages to awaken the heart of the young Fábio, who falls for her.

Yvete, Helena's best friend's confidante, is married to Viriato, a chubby man who enjoys life. He has impotence and, unable to relate sexually with his wife, is getting depressed.

A turning point occurs when Camila becomes pregnant with Edu's child, while Miguel is on the verge of proposing to Helena. This is all shattered by the discovery that Camila has leukemia and that she has lost the baby she was expecting. To save her, she desperately needs a marrow donor, as she and her half-brother Fred are not from the same parent. Helena then reveals the paternity of her daughter: Camila is the daughter she had with Pedro. She enjoyed sexual intercourse with Pedro when both were young, and as a consequence, was expelled from her father Aléssio's house in the countryside. Only Yvete and she were aware of this secret. Wishing to save her daughter from the illness, Helena has a child with Pedro in order to save Camila.

Meanwhile, Capitu is a university student and call girl, an activity she practises with her friend Simone. Both are controlled by Fernando. Capitu, with her salary, supports her parents, Pasqual, a retired intellectual who works as a book reviewer for Miguel, and Ema, a housewife and seamstress. She used to be romantically involved with Helena's son, Fred. However, for various reasons, the latter disappears from her life to marry Clara. For the love of Fred, Capitu decides to leave prostitution. But before that, she is stuck in a living hell, as Orlando, a former customer, is obsessed with her and is trying to get her back into a life of prostitution by constantly harassing her. Furthermore, the parasite Maurinho, who is the father of Capitu's toddler son Bruno, is always after her in attempts to get money. One day, Miguel's son Paulo comes across Capitu and falls in love with her; his shyness and lack of confidence prevent the young man from confessing his feelings to the object of his love.

=== The End ===
Helena gives birth to a daughter, Vitória, and is able to cure Camila. Iris repents of her wickedness, while Cintia and Pedro have a relapse, leaving Iris free to fulfill her dream of living with Pedro, who is also her cousin. Housemaid Rita died while giving birth to twins from Danilo. Alma accepts Danilo back, and they raise Rita's twins.

Cintia reunites with her former lover Romeu. Miguel is at last able to propose to Helena, and she accepts; the two marry in a church. The formerly rebel Ciça is finally interested in Ricardo at the airport. Three years pass by until the 3rd birthday of Vitória. Some couples are now seemingly stable with children: Helena and Miguel, Iris (pregnant) and Pedro, Clara (pregnant) with an unknown character, Capitu (with child and pregnant) and Fred. Only Edu and Camila, and Estella and Bento have no children yet.

== Cast ==
- Vera Fischer as Helena Lacerda
- Reynaldo Gianecchini as Eduardo "Edu" Monteiro Fernandes
- Carolina Dieckmann as Camila Lacerda Ferrari
- Deborah Secco as Íris Frank Lacerda
- Tony Ramos as Miguel Soriano
- José Mayer as Pedro Marcondes Mendes
- Marieta Severo as Alma Flora Pirajá de Albuquerque
- Alexandre Borges as Danilo Menezes
- Giovanna Antonelli as Capitu
- Luigi Baricelli as Frederico "Fred" Lacerda Ferrari
- Regiane Alves as Clara
- Soraya Ravenle as Yvete
- Helena Ranaldi as Cíntia
- Lília Cabral as Íngrid Frank Lacerda
- Fernando Torres as Aléssio Lacerda
- Monica Sielder as Socorro
- Leonardo Villar as Pascoal
- Walderez de Barros as Ema
- Zé Victor Castiel as Viriato
- Flávio Silvino as Paulo Soriano
- Júlia Feldens as Ciça Soriano
- Juliana Silveira as Patricia "Patty" Campos
- Júlia Almeida as Estela Monteiro Fernandes
- Daniel Boaventura as Alex
- Henri Pagnoncelli as Orlando
- Thalma de Freitas as Zilda
- Umberto Magnani as Eládio
- Marly Bueno as Olívia
- Xuxa Lopes as Glória Azambuja
- Paulo Figueiredo as Rodrigo
- Flávia Guimarães as Ana
- Juliana Paes as Ritinha
- Carla Diaz as Rachel
- Leon Góes as Bento
- Vanessa Machado as Simone
- Ana Carbatti as Aline
- Eliete Cigarini as Sílvia Mendes
- André Valli as Onofre
- Beatriz Lyra as Cleide
- Caco Monteiro as Gervásio
- Cláudio Gabriel as Severino
- Paulo Zulu as Romeu
- Cléa Simões as Irene
- Yara Lins as Nilda Soriano
- Denise Sartori as Ofélia
- Luciano Quirino as Laerte

== Reception ==
=== Ratings ===
Timeslot	Episodes	Premiere		Finale		Rank	Season	Average viewership
Timeslot	Episodes	Date	Viewers (in points)	Date	Viewers (in points)	Rank	Season	Average viewership
Mondays—Saturdays; 8:55 pm	209	5 June 2000	45	2 February 2001	59	#1	2000-01	45,4

== Soundtrack ==
The telenovela's soundtrack gained popular and critical acclaim for its blend of Brazilian Bossa Nova classics and contemporary English language pop and country music. In many cases, the songs are associated with one or several characters of the telenovela and can be heard when this character appears in the plot.

- "Corcovado" - Performed by Astrud Gilberto and João Gilberto (opening theme)
- "I'll Try" - Performed by Alan Jackson (associated with Pedro)
- "Breathe" - Performed by Faith Hill (associated with Cintia)
- "Man! I Feel Like a Woman!" - Performed by Shania Twain (associated with Cintia)
- "Samba de verão" - Performed by Caetano Veloso (associated with Helena and Edu, sometimes with Camila and the neighbourhood of Leblon)
- "So Nice (Summer Samba)" - Performed by Bebel Gilberto (associated with Camila and Edu)
- "As Time Goes By (song)" - Performed by Jimmy Durante (associated with Miguel)
- "Balada Do Amor Inabalável" - Performed by Skank (associated with Edu, especially when he is driving along the Rio de Janeiro coastline)
- "Baby" - Performed by Os Mutantes (associated with Camila, Helena and Edu)
- "Rome Wasn't Built in a Day" - Performed by Morcheeba (associated with Iris)
- "Love By Grace" - Performed by Lara Fabian (associated with Camila when she is hit by cancer disease and loses her baby)
- "Spanish Guitar (song)" - Performed by Toni Braxton (associated with Capitu and Fred)
- "The Look of Love" - Performed by Dusty Springfield (associated with Alma)
- "Let's Face the Music and Dance" - Performed by Diana Krall (associated with the city of Rio de Janeiro)
- "Gotta Tell You (song)" - Performed by Samantha Mumba (associated with Estela)
- "When I Fall in Love" - Performed by Rick Astley (associated with Paulo)
- "Gatas Extraordinárias" - Performed by Cássia Eller (associated with Danilo)
- "How Insensitive" - Performed by Laura Fygi (associated with Miguel)
- "Como Vai Você" - Performed by Daniela Mercury (associated with Helena)
- "Save Me" - Performed by Hanson (band) (associated with Camila and Edu after their marriage)
- "Devolva-me" - Performed by Adriana Calcanhotto (associated with Clara and sometimes Helena)
- "Mensagem De Amor" - Performed by Lucas Santana (associated with Paulo)
- "Próprias Mentiras" - Performed by Deborah Blando (associated with Iris)
- "Peão Apaixonado" - Performed by Rionegro & Solimões (associated with Pedro, Iris, and more generally scenes shot in rural settings)
- "Perdendo Dentes" - Performed by Pato Fu (associated with Ciça)
- "Solamente Una Vez" - Performed by Nana Caymmi (associated with Alma Flora)
