= Tainá: An Adventure in the Amazon =

2000 film by Tânia Lamarca

- Directed by: Tânia Lamarca; Sérgio Bloch
- Written by: Cláudia Levay; Reinaldo Moraes
- Produced by: M. A. Marcondes; Pedro Rovai
- Starring: Eunice Baía; Caio Romei; Alexandre Zacchia; Branca Camargo; Betty Erthal; Luiz Carlos Tourinho; Jairo Mattos; Ruy Polanah
- Music by: Luiz Avellar
- Production companies: Tietê Produções Cinematográficas; M. A. Marcondes; Art Films
- Distributed by: Europa Filmes
- Release date: January 12, 2000 (Brazil)
- Running time: 90 minutes
- Country: Brazil
- Language: Portuguese
- Box office: R$3.054.492

Tainá: An Adventure in the Amazon (Portuguese: Tainá - Uma Aventura na Amazônia) is a 2000 Brazilian adventure film directed by Tânia Lamarca and Sérgio Bloch.

The film spawned a sequel and prequel, Tainá 2: A New Amazon Adventure and Tainá 3: The Origin, both released in 2004 and 2011.

== Plot ==
The film tells the adventures of a young indigenous orphan who lives with her grandfather, the wise old Tigê, in a corner of the Rio Negro in the Amazon. With Tigê, she learns the legends and stories of her people, living intimately with the forest and its animals.

Little by little, Tainá becomes a guardian of the forest and manages to save a little monkey from falling into the clutches of a trafficker. Nicknamed Catú, the new little friend becomes her companion after her grandfather's death.

Protected by an amulet left by Tigê, Tainá continues the fight in defense of the jungle.

Pursued by the trafficker, the guardian will stop in a small village where a biologist and her son Joninho live, who is following her mother in her scientific researches.

The agreement between them becomes difficult and Tainá decides to leave the village, but Joninho, who was already planning an "escape" to play a trick on his mother, follows her and now will have to learn from her how to survive in the forest.

== Cast ==
- Eunice Baía — Tainá
- Caio Romei — Joninho
- Ruy Polanah — Vô Tigê
- Jairo Mattos — Rudi
- Branca Camargo — Isabel
- Alexandre Zacchia — Shoba
- Luciana Rigueira — Tikiri
- Charles Paraventi — Boca
- Marcos Apolo — Biriba
- Betty Erthal — Miss Meg
- Luiz Carlos Tourinho — Mr. Smith
- Nadine Voullièmevoz — Catú, the monkey (voice)
- Guilherme Briggs — Ludo, the parrot (voice)
- Alfonso Segura — Aida, the monkey (voice)
- Jaqueline Arashida — Yemanjac

== Release and reception ==
=== Release and awards ===
The film was awarded at the 2000 Christmas Film Festival in the categories best film and best photography (Marcelo Corpanni). In 2001, it also won the prize for best fiction film at the Rio Film Festival and at the Chicago International Children's Film Festival, and the prize for best photography direction at the Brazilian Film Festival in Miami. Tainá - Uma Aventura na Amazônia was launched in cinemas by Art Films and MAM distributors on January 12, 2001, in one hundred theaters, and was watched by 853,210 spectators, collecting 3,054,492 reais. In 2005, it was shown at the Marseille Festival, France.

=== Critical reception ===
Rubens Ewald Filho praised the film saying that it is a "[a]dequate youth adventure" and also the "right choice of Miss Eunice Baía for the title role", and noted that it is "[r]eplet with ecological messages (it looks like a Tarzan [sic] film: every two minutes they close in some exotic animal)". However, he commented that "[it] is well capable of being better accepted abroad, where they are more concerned with the theme and the survival of our Amazon than here". Writing for the Cineclick website, Celso Sabadin said that the feature "has everything to please children and youth audiences, without annoying adults. The film is agile, dynamic, well assembled and brings beautiful images of the Amazon, very well photographed by Marcelo Corpanni". He also praised the dialogues, calling them "fun", and the protagonist's performance, which gave "more veracity and credibility to the story".
