= O Homem Que Desafiou o Diabo =

2007 film directed by Moacyr Góes

- Theatrical release poster
- Directed by: Moacyr Góes
- Based on: Pelejas de Ojuara by: Nei Leandro de Castro
- Starring: Marcos Palmeira
- Production companies: Globo Filmes; L.C Barreto Produções Cinematográficas
- Distributed by: Warner Bros. Pictures
- Release date: 28 September 2007
- Running time: 106 minutes
- Country: Brazil
- Language: Portuguese

O Homem Que Desafiou o Diabo (Portuguese for The Man who Defied the Devil) is a 2007 Brazilian comedy film directed and co-written by Moacyr Góes. It stars Marcos Palmeira, Flávia Alessandra, Lívia Falcão, Sérgio Mamberti and Fernanda Paes Leme. The film is an adaptation of a novel by Nei Leandro de Castro, Pelejas de Ojuara.

== Reception ==
A review on the Brazilian website CInética criticised the commercial approach adopted by the director.
