= I Will Love Again =

2000 single by Lara Fabian

- One of the international cover arts

Single by Lara Fabian

from the album Lara Fabian
- B-side: "You Are My Heart"
- Released: April 18, 2000
- Genre: Dance-pop; Europop
- Length: 3:47
- Label: Columbia; Epic
- Songwriters: Mark Taylor; Paul Barry
- Producers: Mark Taylor; Brian Rawling

Lara Fabian singles chronology
"Adagio" (2000)	"I Will Love Again" (2000)	"I Am Who I Am" (2001)

"I Will Love Again" is a song by Canadian-Belgian singer Lara Fabian from her fourth studio album, Lara Fabian (1999). It was released as the second single and first English single from the album on April 18, 2000. The song was written by Mark Taylor and Paul Barry and was produced by Taylor and Brian Rawling. "I Will Love Again" is a dance-pop and Europop ballad that talks about overcoming a painful breakup with hopes of eventually loving somebody again.

"I Will Love Again" reached number five in Belgium's Wallonia region and number eight in New Zealand. In the United States, the song topped the US Billboard Dance Club Play chart and peaked at number 32 on the Billboard Hot 100. Elsewhere, the single reached the top 20 in Austria, Canada, France, Hungary, Iceland, Spain, and Switzerland. Four versions of the song were produced: two in English and two in Spanish, each featuring both a dance-pop version and a ballad reprise. Three music videos were made for the dance-pop version, with two being from the English one and one for the Spanish version.

== Background and release ==
With the two-year absence from music by the Canadian singer Céline Dion, record label Sony Music expressed the desire to sign with the Belgian-Italian singer Lara Fabian to record her first English album, since both are considered power ballad singers. "I Will Love Again" was one of the first songs Columbia Records commissioned for her debut-English studio album, as the label wanted a dance-pop song to ensure she would breakthrough in the U.S. Radio programmers first heard the song and were enthusiastic about it, with one noting: "I thought the song was awesome the first time I heard it. ‘I Will Love Again’ is a beautiful song, with the melody and the range of her voice, and just really fits the sound of the radio station. It's always difficult to break a new artist, but I think Columbia is going to be fine with her.” Music director of a mainstream radio also highlighted: "I think Lara has a classic voice in the vein of Barbra Streisand, but it’s hip as well. And lyrically, the song is a sort of female anthem, so it’s really hitting our core."

Labelled as the lead single of the album in English-speaking territories, "I Will Love Again" debuted in the clubs on April 18, 2000, where Columbia sent the song on double-vinyl and CD singles to test its impact. Later, the song was added to adult, hot adult, rhythmic crossover and top 40 radio formats on both May 8 and 9, 2000. A "ballad reprise" version featuring a smooth rendition of the track and new vocals by Fabian was released to some CD singles format and on a special edition of the album. To ensure her popularity among Latin audience, both versions of "I Will Love Again" were also released titled "Otro amor vendrá" (English: Another Love Will Come). A CD single featuring four versions of the track, including the Spanish ones was released as well. In some Spanish-speaking territories, the ballad reprise and the dance-pop version in Spanish were included as bonus tracks on the album. Remixes from famous producers David Morales, Hex Hector and Thunderpuss were commissioned to further promote the track.

== Composition and lyrics ==
"I Will Love Again" was written by Paul Barry and Mark Taylor, with production being handled by Taylor and Brian Rawling. It is an uptempo dance-pop and Europop song, being known for having a "powerhouse optimistic" production. Lyrically, the song tells a story about a "broken-hearted Fabian proclaiming strength in the midst of turmoil, swearing that love will come her way once more." Fabian commented on the song, saying: "I love the lyric. It’s very empowering and so simple. As much as someone may be broken-hearted and feeling like this is the end of the world, someone new comes along through a completely different door, and the magic appears again. I love raising my arms and singing this to an audience because it so relates to reality. It’s a real, simple, human lyric. It doesn’t teach, indoctrinate, or wag a finger. It just tells it like we all know it." She further elaborated on the track:

"It gives hope through the darkest moments, and it shows that hope doesn't have an expiration date. Believing in love doesn't have an expiration date. And that's what I love about that song. To me, there's something even deeper about that song, which is the joy that is carried by the track. It could've been very dramatic, but the paradox is that the theme of the song carries joy, and joy carries the theme of the song. That’s what makes it a timeless track."

== Critical reception ==
Most critics were positive towards the track. Chuck Taylor of Billboard positively reviewed the song as her first foray into English, describing it as "an amazing, sky-sweeping delivery that packs emotion behind the beat and the kind of powerhouse chops that you’re simply not going to believe." Mark Hamlin, program director of a Chicago adult contemporary radio, praised her range and vocals as "incredible" and how she has "a beautiful voice". Judy Wieder from The Advocate called it an "irresistible dance hit", an adjective also echoed by Gavin Report, while Erica Russell of PopCrush named it a "sweeping, bittersweet dance track." William Ruhlmann picked the track as the "album's best track" in his AllMusic review.

== Commercial performance ==
"I Will Love Again" was Fabian's first song to appear on the Billboard charts and became a multi-format hit. Initially promoted to the clubs, the song first appeared on the Billboard Dance Club Play chart, becoming the "Hot Shot Debut" at number 40 on the week of April 8, 2000. After climbing for three weeks, the song rose to number 13 while also debuting on the Billboard Maxi-Single Sales chart at number 40 on the week of April 29, 2000. It became the greatest gainer the following week, rising to number five, while also entering the top 10 on the Dance Club Play chart. It peaked atop the Dance Club Play chart on the week of May 27, 2000, after eight weeks, becoming Fabian's first and only number one on the chart. It would debut on the Billboard Hot 100 chart on the week of June 10, 2000, at number 91, becoming her first song to do so. In the same week, it would also debut on the Billboard Adult Contemporary chart at number 30. It would later peak at number 32 on the Hot 100, number 10 on the Adult Contemporary chart, and number 24 on the Mainstream Top 40.

In Canada, "I Will Love Again" reached number four on the Canadian Singles Chart. It also entered the top 10 in the Czech Republic, Hungary, New Zealand, Poland, and Wallonia. The song's Spanish version, "Otro amor vendrá", was also a success on the charts, debuting and peaking at number six on Spain's AFYVE chart. Elsewhere, it reached the top 20 in Austria, France, Iceland, and Switzerland. It was also Fabian's first and only song to chart in Australia, reaching number 31, and the United Kingdom, peaking at number 63.

== Music videos and live performances ==
Two music videos were made for the English uptempo version of the song. One features the singer in a house party and the other features Lara in a club party. A video for the Spanish-uptempo version titled "Otro amor vendrá" was also shot and mainly uses scenes from the house party version. Fabian also promoted "I Will Love Again" in the United States with live performances, including one on The Today Show and another on Miss USA 2001 beauty pageant.

== Track listings ==
US maxi-CD single

1. "I Will Love Again" (album version) – 3:47
2. "I Will Love Again" (David Morales club mix) – 8:00
3. "I Will Love Again" (Hex Hector main mix) – 11:00
4. "I Will Love Again" (Thunderpuss club mix) – 10:34

US 12-inch single

A1. "I Will Love Again" (David Morales club mix) – 8:02
A2. "I Will Love Again" (Thunderpuss club mix) – 10:34
B1. "I Will Love Again" (David Morales club mix) – 7:12
B2. "I Will Love Again" (Hex Hector main mix) – 11:03

UK CD single

1. "I Will Love Again" – 3:43
2. "I Will Love Again" (David Morales radio remix) – 3:52
3. "I Will Love Again" (ballad reprise) – 4:54
4. "I Will Love Again" (video)

UK cassette single

1. "I Will Love Again"
2. "I Will Love Again" (ballad reprise)

European CD single

1. "I Will Love Again" – 3:47
2. "You Are My Heart" – 4:11

European maxi-CD single

1. "I Will Love Again" – 3:47
2. "I Will Love Again" (ballad reprise) – 4:54
3. "You Are My Heart" – 4:11

Australian CD single

1. "I Will Love Again" (album version) – 3:43
2. "I Will Love Again" (Hex Hector 7-inch vocal mix) – 3:30
3. "I Will Love Again" (David Morales radio remix) – 3:45
4. "I Will Love Again" (Thunderpuss radio mix) – 3:50
5. "I Will Love Again" (video) – 3:43

Japanese CD single

1. "I Will Love Again" (album version) – 3:47
2. "I Will Love Again" (ballad reprise) – 4:55
3. "I Will Love Again" (David Morales club remix) – 8:04

== Charts ==
=== Weekly charts ===
Chart (2000)	Peak position
Australia (ARIA)	31
Austria (Ö3 Austria Top 40)	16
Belgium (Ultratip Bubbling Under Flanders)	2
Belgium (Ultratop 50 Wallonia)	5
Canada (Nielsen SoundScan)	4
Canada Top Singles (RPM)	19
Canada Adult Contemporary (RPM)	4
Czech Republic (IFPI)	2
Europe (Eurochart Hot 100)	24
France (SNEP)	16
Germany (GfK)	25
Hungary (Mahasz)	9
Iceland (Íslenski Listinn Topp 40)	18
New Zealand (Recorded Music NZ)	8
Poland Airplay (Music & Media)	2
Scottish Singles Sales (Official Charts)	63
Spain (Promusicae) "Otro amor vendrá"	6
Sweden (Sverigetopplistan)	31
Switzerland (Schweizer Hitparade)	14
UK Singles (Official Charts)	63
US Billboard Hot 100	32
US Adult Contemporary (Billboard)	10
US Dance Club Songs (Billboard)	1
US Dance Singles Sales (Billboard)	2
US Pop Airplay (Billboard)	24

=== Year-end charts ===
Chart (2000)	Position
Belgium (Ultratop 50 Wallonia)	60
Europe (Eurochart Hot 100)	82
France (SNEP)	88
Germany (Media Control)	96
New Zealand (RIANZ)	42
Switzerland (Schweizer Hitparade)	74
US Adult Contemporary (Billboard)	24
US Dance Club Play (Billboard)	21
US Maxi-Singles Sales (Billboard)	8

Chart (2001)	Position
Canada (Nielsen SoundScan)	94

== Certifications ==
Region	Certification	Certified units/sales
Belgium (BRMA)	Gold	25,000^{*}
^{*} Sales figures based on certification alone.

== Release history ==
Region	Date	Format(s)	Label(s)	Ref(s).
United States	April 18, 2000	CD	Columbia	
United States	May 8, 2000	Adult contemporary; hot adult contemporary; modern adult contemporary radio	Columbia	
United States	May 9, 2000	Rhythmic contemporary; contemporary hit radio	Columbia	
Japan	May 31, 2000	CD	SME	
United Kingdom	October 16, 2000	CD; cassette	Columbia	
