= Luiz Avellar =

Brazilian musician

João Luiz de Avellar, better known simply as Luiz Avellar (born April 7, 1956) is a Brazilian piano player.

== Early life ==
Luiz de Avellar was born in Rio de Janeiro, Brazil on April 7, 1956. He began playing the piano as a child and studied in New York City, New York.

== Career ==
He arranged songs and played on albums by Gal Costa, Djavan, and Milton Nascimento and has played with Nico Assumpção, Vitor Assis Brasil, Hélio Delmiro, Wayne Shorter, and Toots Thielemas. In 2000, he released Luiz Avellar in Motion (Savalla Records).

He composed the soundtrack of several Rede Globo shows and telenovelas. Luiz de Avellar also composed the soundtrack of the 2001 movie Tainá: An Adventure in the Amazon.
