= Lisa M =

Puerto Rican rap and reggaeton artist

- Born: Mary Lisa Caceres; January 16, 1974 (age 52); San Juan, Puerto Rico
- Genres: Hip hop; pop; merenrap; reggaetón; trap
- Occupations: Rapper; singer; songwriter; dancer; record producer; composer; DJ
- Instrument: Vocals
- Years active: 1988–present
- Labels: Prime; Sony Music; Right Touch; White Lion
- Website: http://www.lisammusic.com/ at the Wayback Machine (archived November 24, 2015)

Mary Lisa (Marlisa) Marrero Vázquez (born January 16, 1974) better known by her stage name Lisa M, is a Puerto Rican rapper, singer, composer, dancer, record producer, and global DJ. She is known as the first female rapper artist to debut in Latin America. In 2019, Billboard identified her as one of the leading women performers in the Latin urban genre, along with Glory, Natti Natasha, and Karol G.

== Early life ==
Mary Lisa Marrero Vázquez was born on January 17, 1974, from a Dominican mother and a Puerto Rican father in Puerta de Tierra, a neighborhood of San Juan, Puerto Rico. She started hip-hop dancing at the age of 11 years old, going on to work later as a dancer for the rap artist Vico C.

== Career ==
=== Trampa and No Lo Derrumbes ===
Lisa M recorded her first album Trampa in 1989 at the age of 15 with the record label Prime Records. The first song she recorded for this album was "La Segunda Cita" (with Puerto Rican rap pioneer Vico C), which was the starting point to her successful career making her the first female Spanish-language rapper in Puerto Rico and Latin America. She grew more and more popular becoming successful for her interpretative strength, diversity, skills, and the sensuality of her performance. In a short time, she captivated her audiences in Central and South America, the Caribbean, and the United States. The success of this album led to her first gold record.

Lisa M recorded her second album in 1990 titled No Lo Derrumbes which obtained platinum status, with over 100,000 copies sold in Puerto Rico and the United States. This album included the hits "No Lo Derrumbes," "Tu Pum-Pum," "Menéalo," "Ja-Rican Jive feat. Pesos," "Cuerpo y Alma," and "Rico en Amor." The album was produced by Miguel Correa, Jorge Oquendo (Prime Records), DJ Playero, Baron Lopez, and Eduardo Reyes. All of the songs were written by Vico C and Lisa M.

=== Sony Music ===
In 1991, Lisa M signed to the multinational record label Sony Music, and launched her third album titled Flavor of the Latin which had overwhelming success in Puerto Rico and throughout Latin America acquiring a platinum record. She sold out tours in Puerto Rico, Ecuador, Nicaragua, Costa Rica, Guatemala, Peru, Bolivia, Panama, Venezuela, Dominican Republic, El Salvador, Honduras, and the United States, in which she performed concerts sharing and collaborating with celebrities like Celia Cruz, Juan Gabriel, Gloria Estefan, Ricky Martin, Selena, and Tito Puente. The greatest hits of this album, "Tiempo De Amar," "Everybody Dancing Now," "Ingrato," and "Flavor of the Latin," won her an award for Best International Artist in TVyNovelas and at the Premios Lo Nuestro.

Her fourth album, Ahora Vengo Alborotá, came out in 1992 adding to Lisa M's platinum status career.

In 1996, Lisa M released her fifth album titled Soy Atrevida, which was equally successful. She went on to release her sixth album Y Sobreviví in 1998, working with artists such as Ricky Martin and La India. Given her success, she has been awarded gold and platinum for sales in the United States.

In 2001 she launched her calendar Lisa M 2001. She also hosted the internationally known Jamz mun2 TV show program on Telemundo, which achieved international ratings, opening the doors for reggaeton and urban music artists in the United States and Latin America.

=== Respect ===
In 2005, White Lion Records, recognized as one of the best labels of the urban genre at that time, signed Lisa M to her album titled Respect. The album includes the songs "Fuego," "Hey, Ladies," "Quítate," and "Encendío." It was a collaboration with Moncho Rivera. "Quítate" was produced by Taino, while "Hey, Ladies" was part of the soundtrack of the 2007 movie Feel the Noise produced by Jennifer Lopez, starring Omarion Grandberry, Giancarlo Esposito, and Melonie Diaz. In 2008, Sony BMG launched Respect Delux which is a compilation of premixed hits, and a duet with La India, a well-known international salsa star known by her fans as "La Princesa De La Salsa."

=== Lisa M DJ ===
In 2005, Lisa M expanded her presence in the music industry as rap artist, record producer, and dancer, by working as a professional DJ, known as "DJ Miss M," focusing on electronic music. Lisa M launched her career as a DJ in Miami playing after hours marathon sessions.

As a DJ, she has performed at clubs and events in cities like Miami, Detroit, New York, Las Vegas, Los Angeles, Granada, and Barcelona, and locations such as Puerto Rico, Dominican Republic, Spain, Greece, Monaco, Morocco, Sweden, and Ibiza, mixing a variety of musical styles including House, Techno, Tech house, Tribal Tech and Deep house. Lisa M is the first female Latin artist to become an International Celebrity DJ.

In 2007 and 2008 her agenda was booked as she made appearances in various clubs and also at the Winter Music Conference in Miami Beach. In 2009 she started Couture Sound, the name for the label in which she recorded sessions, produced, and remixed for many artists, compilations, and other labels.

In 2010, Lisa M visited Barcelona to expand her music. She played in various clubs including Club Pacha. Later that year she returned to Miami to perform at the WMC (Winter Music Conference) 2010 and participated in important venues like the hotel pool party Shelbourne, Nikki Beach, Discoteka, and Nocturnal. When she completed her agenda in Miami, she went back to Spain in the summer, signing a contract with one of the most important Event Companies in Europe, Cafe Ole, positioning her as an important celebrity DJ in clubs all over Europe, such as Club Discothèque and Space Ibiza. Lisa M also worked with famous DJs such as David Guetta, Carl Cox, Wally Lopez, David Vendetta, Matt Caseli, Marco Carola, Steve Lawler, Loco Dice, and Oscar G. She also made an appearance at one of the most important live radio shows of Ibiza, Ibiza Global Radio, alongside David Moreno and Tony Moreno, and also worked with DJ Chus and David Penn on the song "Libres Para Siempre."

In 2016, Lisa M returned to the recording studios to record her first single titled "La Calle Se Puso Pa Mi" under her own record label VBW inc. She recorded "Tentándote" in 2017. In 2018 she recorded "Malas Palabras" featuring Ñengo Flow, one of the most influential rappers in the urban genre.

Lisa M has become a leading female DJ in the electronic music scene a style Super Tech Tribal Techno influenced by the sound and style of DJs Luciano and his label Cadenza, Technasia, Loco Dice, Carl Cox, and Nicole Moudaber.

=== 2023 Controversy ===
Lack of recognition of Lisa M's pioneering status among women rappers in Spanish language created controversy in 2023 after the Premios Lo Nuestro Awards recognized Ivy Queen as a pioneering female urban artist. Comments by Dayanara Torres were interpreted as suggesting that Ivy Queen was the first artist of her kind, slighting Lisa M's contributions.

== Personal life ==
Lisa M came out as a lesbian on Facebook on April 19, 2010. She married the Puerto Rican ex-model Marisol Díaz in May 2015.

== Discography ==
=== Albums ===
Year	Album details	Label
1989	Trampa	Prime Records
1990	No Lo Derrumbes	Prime Records
1991	Flavor of the Latin	Sony Discos Inc.
1992	Ahora Vengo Alborotá...	Sony Discos Inc.
1996	Soy Atrevida	Right Touch
1999	Y Sobreviví	Sony Discos
2006	Respect	White Lion/Sony Music

=== Charted singles ===
Year	Title	Billboard Hot Latin Songs	Album
1992	Everybody Dancing Now	38	Flavor Of The Latin
1993	Subeme El Radio	32	Ahora Vengo Alborota...

=== Other songs ===
Year	Album	Song(s) featured
1991	Meren Rap Cutout Compilation	"Tu Pum Pum"
1991	Dance Hall Reggae Español	"Ja Rican Jive"
1994	Playero 36	"Bailo y Salto"
1994	Playero 37	"A Todo El Barrio"
1997	DJ Stefano	"Retirarte"
2002	La Vieja Guardia The Oldschool	"La Segunda Cita"
2002	La Familia Above All	"Hombre Completo feat. Las Chiviricas"
2003	NYC Sex	"Come To My Party"
2005	Tony Touch	The Reggaetony Album "Toca-Me-La"
2005	Adassa Kamasutra	"Ya No Soy Tu Mujer"
2005	Eliel Presenta – Monster Reggaeton CD	"That Is The Flow"
2016	Single La Calle Se Puso Pa Mi	"La Calle Se Puso Pa Mi"
2017	Single Tentandote	"Tentandote"
2017	Remix La Calle Se Puso Pa Mi	"La Calle Se Puso Pa Mi feat. Bimbo"
2018	Single Malas Palabras	"Malas Palabras"
2018	Malas Palabras	"Malas Palabras feat. Ñengo Flow"
2019	Single	"Es El Amor"
2019	Single	"Animal"

== See also ==
- List of Puerto Ricans
- List of gay, lesbian or bisexual people
- List of reggaeton musicians
- List of club DJs
