= Taino (rapper) =

Puerto Rican singer-songwriter

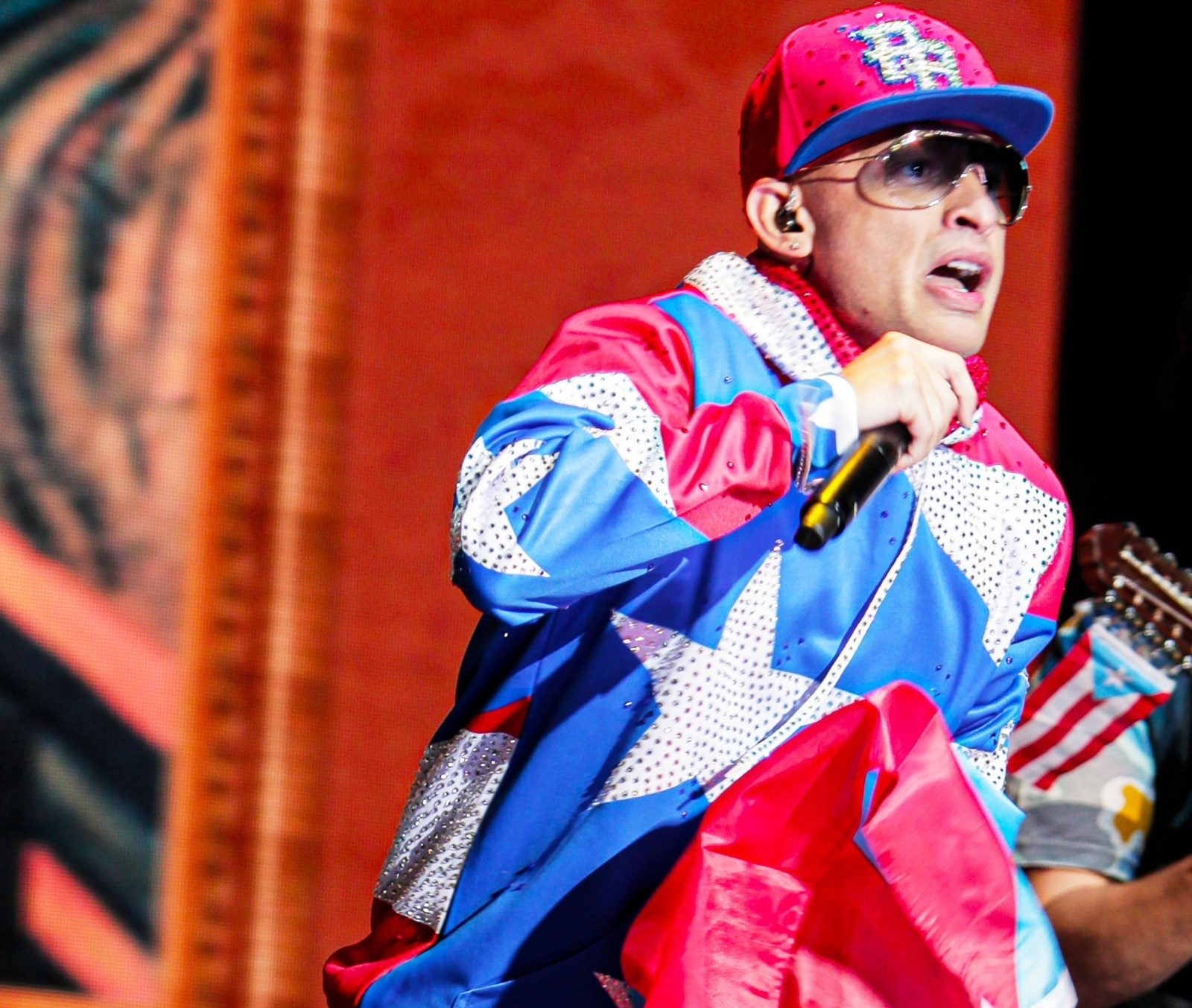
- Born: Joel A. Bosch; Mayagüez, Puerto Rico
- Other names: Joel Bosh, Taino
- Education: Holyoke Community College; University of Massachusetts Amherst
- Occupations: Rapper; singer; songwriter; businessman; developer
- Years active: 1994–present
- Organization: BoschMusic

Joel A. Bosch, also known by his stage name Taino, is a Puerto Rican rapper, singer-songwriter, and producer best known for his song "Yo Soy Boricua Pa' Que Tú Lo Sepas." The song, released in 1995, has become a symbol of Puerto Rican pride and has been adopted by many as a rallying cry for their identity. Taino's song has been performed by notable figures such as Paul McCartney and Bruno Mars during their concerts in Puerto Rico. It was also used during an entrance for a Boxing match by Tito Trinidad.

In 2002, Taino was also the host for Jamz Reggaeton Show on Mun2 during that same year he also released his third album titled El Conteo Final.

In 2005, Taino was a featured artist on the album Rappa Ternt Sanga by T-Pain on the song "Como Estas". The album was certified Gold by RIAA. During the same year he also appeared with Adassa in the album Kamassutra on the song "De Tra". In 2006 he was then featured on the song "Estoy Perdido" (reggaeton) remix by Luis Fonsi.

In addition to his music career, Bosh is a founder, lead developer, and entrepreneur in the cryptocurrency space, where he helped develop I/O Coin, a blockchain-based system for securely storing data and managing digital rights.

In December 2022, Taino's song chorus "Yo Soy Boricua Pa' Que Tu Lo Sepas" was cited by Congresswoman Alexandria Ocasio-Cortez during a discussion on the Puerto Rico Status Act, marking the first time it was entered into the Congressional Record. This historical reference highlights the significance of the song as a symbol of Puerto Rican culture and identity. The song has been widely recognized as a symbol of Puerto Rican identity and pride, and has been covered by various artists throughout the years. In 2019, Taino released a compilation EP album, also titled Yo Soy Boricua Pa' Que Tu Lo Sepas, featuring new and remixed versions of the song.

== Early life and career ==
In 1994, Taino released his first debut compact disc self titled Taino under the label VC Records, owned by Vico C. The album was produced by Lumberjack.

== Yo Soy Boricua Pa' Que Tu Lo Sepas! ==
After Taino ended his contract with VC Records, his second album was released under Lumberjack Records, titled Con Mi corona. He released his second studio album in 1995, which included "Yo soy boricua pa' que tú lo sepas" as its final track. The song was inspired by an incident during a recording session in New York when a sound engineer insulted Puerto Ricans. Taino quickly wrote the song in response, with the chorus "Yo soy boricua pa' que tú lo sepas" (I am Puerto Rican, just so you know) as its central theme.

The song did not gain immediate popularity but later became famous when boxer Félix "Tito" Trinidad used it as his entrance music for important matches. The song's video, which was financed by Banchy and Oscarito Serrano of Grupomanía, propelled its success after premiering on the TV show "No te duermas" with host Antonio Sánchez "El Gángster". Taino broke barriers of Latin Rap with his successful track, Yo Soy Boricua Pa' Que Tu Lo Sepas!, as it became an anthem for Puerto Ricans around the world.

In 2015 Newspaper Primera Hora wrote a piece calling the title "a 20 años de nuestro coro mas famoso" [English] "20 Years After Our Most Famous Chorus" calling Taino's chorus to be the most famous in Puerto Rico's history in the past 20 years.

== Legal issues ==
In 2018, there were several legal cases where Bosch claimed he owned all rights to his songs and that companies like Sony Music, T-Mobile, Coca Cola, and Popular Inc infringed on his US copyright for the song and trademark for the phrase "Yo Soy Boricua, Pa' Que Tu Lo Sepas." by using the song in their products without permission. All cases were settled out of court amicably. In the case of Popular Inc., they acknowledged Joel Bosch's authorship and the use of the song in the special "Que lindo es Puerto Rico" by Pirulo and la Tribu e Ismael Miranda, following an amicable settlement.

== Discography ==
- Taino (Released) 1994
- Con Mi Corona (Released) 1995
- Latin House Jam (Released) August 4, 1998
- El Conteo Final (Released) November 22, 2002
- Sin Censura (Released) 2005
- The Future (Released) 2007
- Reggaeton en la Parada Puertorriqueña, Vol. 2 (Released) June 7, 2005
- El Bravo (Released) September 16, 2019
- Yo Soy Boricua, Pa' Que Tu Lo Sepas (Released) September 12 2019 [EP] [Digital]
- Toma Toma Single (Released) 2020 Better Call Saul Season 5 Episode 3
- Mi Trayectoria (Released) 2022
- La Luz (Released) 2023
- Yo Soy Boricua, Pa’ Que Tu Lo Sepas Vol. 2 (Released) 2024

== Song collaborations and producer credits ==
- T-Pain Feat Taino (Rappa Ternt Sanga) Song: Como Estas
- Adassa Feat Taino (Kamasutra) Song: De-Tra
- Luis Fonsi Feat Taino (Éxitos Eternos: Remixes - EP) Song: Estoy Perdido
- Lisa M Album (Respect) Song: Quitate Produced by Taino Song: Pa' La Calle, Quitate
- Mexicano 777 Song: Traga Remix Produced, Composer & Performer Taino
- Mexicano 777 Album Poeta Clásico Produced by Taino Songs: Ira Callejera (Original Version), Ponte Bruto (Rap Version)
- Dj kane Song: Mientele Composer Joel Bosh Taino
- Angel Lopez: Perdoname Performer & Composer by Taino

== Music videos and interviews ==
- No Te Tomes La Pocion 1994
- Yo Soy Boricua Pa Que Tu Lo Sepas (Video Original) 1996
- Festival 2000
- Una Noche 2012
- El Bravo 2020
- Primetime Interview: Yo Soy Boricua Pa Que Tu Lo Sepas 2020
- Wapa TV Noticentro Interview: Yo Soy Boricua Pa' Que Tu Lo Sepas 2020
- La Luz 2023
