= Ismail (name) =

nuraiza
- Pronunciation: Arabic: [ˈʔɪsmaːˈʕiːl] Egyptian Arabic: [esmæˈʕiːl] Turkish: [ismaːˈil] Persian: [esmɒːˈʔiːl] Tatar: [ismæˈʁil]
- Gender: male
- Language: Arabic

Origin
- Language: Arabic
- Meaning: Heard by God

Other names
- Alternative spelling: Esmail
- Related names: Hebrew ישמעאל “Ishmael”

Ismail, Esmael, Esmaeel, Esmail, İsmail, or Ismaïl (Arabic: إسماعيل, romanized: ʾIsmāʿīl) is a masculine given name of Arabic origin. It corresponds to the English name Ishmael. Notable people with the name include:

== Etymology and meaning ==
The literal translation of the name Ismail is "heard by God" and according to Abrahamic tradition, it refers to the yearning of Abraham and his wife, Sarah, to have a child. Ismail's mother, however, was not Sarah, but Hagar, Sarah's maidservant, who Sarah gave to Abraham as a concubine because she was unable to have a child. Sarah later does give birth to a son, Isaac.

According to Genesis, the name is given by God as He heard the cries of Hagar who had been mistreated by Sarah after becoming pregnant and run away.

According to Islamic tradition, Ismail's mother, Hagar was also a full wife of the Prophet Abraham.

== Given name ==
=== Esmaeel ===
- Esmaeel Azar (born 1944), Iranian writer
- Esmaeel Khalaj (born 1936), Iranian writer, director, and actor

=== Esmael ===
- Esmael Barari (born 1965), Iranian filmmaker
- Esmael Mangudadatu (born 1968), Filipino politician

=== Esmail ===
- Esmail Ahmadi-Moghaddam (born 1961), Iranian military officer
- Esmail Babolian (born 1946), Iranian numerical analyst
- Esmail Baghaei (born 1975), Iranian diplomat
- Esmail Bakhshi (born 1983), Iranian activist and political prisoner
- Esmail Daghayeghi (1954–1987), Iranian military commander
- Esmail Davarfar (1933–2008), Iranian actor
- Esmail Momtaz od-Dowleh (1880–1933), Iranian statesman
- Esmail Farivar (1927–2011), Iranian politician
- Esmail Halali (born 1973), Iranian football player and manager
- Esmail Jalayer, Iranian painter
- Esmail Khoi (1938–2021), Iranian poet and writer
- Esmail Koushan (1917–1981), Iranian film director
- Esmail Mehrabi (born 1944), Iranian actor
- Esmail Merat (1893–1949), Iranian politician
- Esmail Mohammad (born 1960), Afghan boxer
- Esmail Qaani (1957–2025), Iranian brigadier general
- Esmail Rangraz (1975–2017), Iranian serial killer
- Esmail Shooshtari (1949–2024), Iranian politician
- Esmail Sohikish, Iranian tennis player
- Esmail Zanjani, American academic

=== Ismail ===
- Ismail, son of Ibrahim
- Ismail of Ghazni, Emir of Ghazna, brother of Mahmud of Ghazni
- Ismail of Johor (1894–1981), sultan of Johor
- Isma'il of Sennar (1736–1776), ruler of the Kingdom of Sennar
- Ismail I (1487–1524), Shah of Safavid Iran
- Ismail I of Granada (1279–1325), Nasrid ruler of the Emirate of Granada
- Ismail II (1537–1577), Shah of Safavid Iran
- Ismail II of Granada (1339–1360), Nasrid ruler of the Emirate of Granada
- Ismail III (1733–1773), Shah of Safavid Iran
- Ismail III of Granada (died 1450), Nasrid ruler of the Emirate of Granada
- Ismail IV of Granada (died 1463), Nasrid ruler of the Emirate of Granada
- Ismail Abakar (born 2004), Qatari hurdler
- Ismail el Abassi (born 1983), Dutch politician
- Ismail Abdallah (born 1933), Egyptian gymnast
- Ismail Sabri Abdullah (1924–2006), Egyptian economist and politician
- Ismail Abdul-Ganiyu (born 1996), Ghanaian footballer
- Ismail Abdullaiev (born 1966), Ukrainian and Russian TV director
- Ismail Abdullatif (born 1986), Bahraini footballer
- Ismail Abilov (born 1951), Bulgarian freestyle wrestler
- Ismail Ali Abokor (born 1937), Somali politician and major general
- Ismail Abu (born 1984), Malaysian field hockey player
- Ismail Adham (1911–1940), Egyptian writer and literary critic
- Ismail Ahmad (born 1956), Malaysian politician
- Ismail Ahmad (basketball) (born 1976), Egyptian-Lebanese basketball player
- Ismail ibn al-Ahmar, Andalusian historian
- Ismail Ahmed (businessman) (born 1960), Somali-British entrepreneur
- Ismail Ahmed (footballer, born 1983) (born 1983), Moroccan-Emirati footballer
- Ismail Ould Cheikh Ahmed (born 1960), Mauritanian diplomat and politician
- Ismail Ahmedani (1930–2007), Pakistani novelist
- Ismail Ahmedov (1907–1986), Russian Islamic scholar
- Ismail Akbay (1930–2003), Turkish scientist
- Ismail Al-Ajmi (born 1984), Omani footballer
- Ismail Alam (1868–1937), Bengali politician, teacher, and activist
- Ismail Alieksandrovič (1929–2024), Belarusian Islamic cleric
- Ismail Amat (1935–2018), Chinese politician
- Ismail Amirkhizi (1873–1966), Iranian author and constitutional intellectual
- Ismail Al-Amour (born 1984), Palestinian footballer
- Ismail Mumin Are, Somaliland politician
- Ismail al-Armouti (died 2013), Jordanian politician
- Ismail Faruqi Ashari (born 1986), Malaysian footballer
- Ismail Atalan (born 1980), German-Turkish football manager
- Isma'il al-Atrash (died 1869), Druze chieftain
- Ismail Ayob (1942–2025), South African lawyer
- Ismail al-Azhari (1900–1969), Sudanese politician
- Ismail Omar Abdul Aziz (1911–1994), Malaysian Islamic scholar
- Ismail Pasha al-Azm, Ottoman statesman
- Ismail Azzaoui (born 1998), Belgian footballer
- Ismail Ba (born 1974), Senegalese footballer
- Ismail Badruddin I (1582–1676), Indian Islamic leader
- Ismail Bakar (born 1960), Malaysian politician
- Ismail Balanga (born 1972), South Sudanese football manager
- Ismail Barlov (born 2010), Bosnian Paralympic swimmer
- Ismail Bawa (born 1947), Ghanaian politician
- Isma'il Beg (died 1794), Uyghur rebel leader
- Ismail Belmaalem (born 1988), Moroccan footballer
- Ismail Berdiyev (1954–2024), Russian mufti
- Ismail Hakkı Berkok (1890–1954), Turkish general, publicist, and historian
- Ismail Bey (1735–1791), Mamluk emir
- Ismail Boçari (1917–2014), Albanian professor of medicine
- Ismail Bulatov (1902–1975), Soviet Crimean Tatar major general
- Isma'il ibn Bulbul (844/45–891), Abbasid Caliphate official
- Ismail Haqqi Bursevi (1653–1725), Ottoman Sufi scholar
- Ismail Ahmed Cachalia (1908–2003), South African political activist
- Ismail Mahomed Cachalia (born 1929), South African politician
- Ismail Changezi (1954–2019), Pakistani TV actor
- Ismail Chirine (1919–1994), Egyptian royal diplomat
- Ismail Faruque Chowdhury (born 1953), Bangladeshi Army general
- Ismail Dahqani (born 1991), Qatari footballer
- Ismail Damit, Bruneian politician and architect
- Ismail Darbar (born 1964), Indian composer
- Ismail Daut (1956–2022), Malaysian politician and lecturer
- Ismail Dawood (born 1976), English cricketer
- Ismail Diakhité (born 1991), Mauritanian footballer
- Ismail Dibirov (born 2004), Russian footballer
- Ismail al-Din, Egyptian politician
- Ismail Easa (born 1989), Maldivian footballer
- Ismail Ebrahim (1946–2020), South African cricketer
- Ismail Ediyev (born 1988), Russian footballer
- Ismail Elfath (born 1982), Moroccan-born American football referee
- Ismail Ergashev (1945–2018), Uzbek general
- Ismail Ertug (born 1975), German politician
- Ismail Essam (born 1967), Egyptian archer
- Ismail Fahmi (1922–1997), Egyptian diplomat
- Ismail Mustafa al-Falaki (1825–1901), Egyptian astronomer and mathematician
- Ismail al-Faruqi (1921–1986), Palestinian-American Islamic scholar
- Ismail Feyzullabeyli (1925–2008), Azerbaijani writer
- Ismail Gamadiid (1960–2020), Somali politician
- Ismail Gangji (1788–1883), Indian Islamic religious leaders
- Ismail Gasprinsky (1851–1914), Crimean Tatar intellectual, educator, publisher, and politician
- Ismail El-Gawsaqi (1929–2009), Egyptian politician
- Ismail Ghazali (born 1977), Moroccan writer
- Ismail al-Ghoul (1997–2024), Palestinian journalist
- Ismail El Gizouli, Sudanese civil servant
- Ismail Qemali Gramshi, Albanian politician
- Ismail Gulgee (1926–2007), Pakistani artist
- Ismail El Haddad (born 1990), Moroccan footballer
- Ismail Ahmed Rajab Al Hadidi (born 1955), Iraqi Kurdish politician
- Ismail Al Hammadi (born 1988), Emirati footballer
- Ismail Haniyeh (1963–2024), Palestinian Hamas politician
- Omar Yaser Ismail Hantoli (born 2005), Palestinian taekwondo athlete
- Ismail Haron (1946–2012), Singaporean musical artist
- Ismail Hasham, Indian businessman
- Isma'il ibn Isa ibn Musa al-Hashimi, Abbasid personage and governor of Egypt
- Isma'il ibn Salih ibn Ali al-Hashimi, Abbasid governor of Egypt and Aleppo
- Ismail Qureshi al Hashmi (1260–1349), Indian Sufi and Islamic scholar
- Ismail Hassan (born 1987), Djiboutian footballer
- Ismail Abu Hatab (1993–2025), Palestinian photojournalist and filmmaker
- Ismail H'Maidat (born 1995), Dutch-Moroccan footballer
- Ismail Hoxha, Albanian politician
- Ismail Mahmud Hurre (1943–2023), Somali politician
- Ismail Hussain (1950–2015), Indian politician
- Ismail Hutson (1938–2012), Malaysian actor
- Ismail Ibrahim (1932–2020), Pakistani cricketer
- Ismail ibn Ibrahim (756–810), Iranian Hadith scholar
- Ismail Isa (born 1989), Bulgarian footballer
- Ismail Isakov (born 1950), Kyrgyzstani general
- Ismail Ahmed Ismail (born 1984), Sudanese middle-distance runner
- Ismail Ali Ismail, Somali writer and former diplomat
- Ismail Fahd Ismail (1940–2018), Kuwaiti novelist, short story writer, and literary critic
- Ismail Rashid Ismail (born 1972), Emirati footballer
- Ismail Ismaili (born 1981), Macedonian footballer
- Ismail Ismailov, Turkmen general
- Ismail Izzani (born 2000), Malaysian singer, songwriter, and actor
- Isma'il Pasha Abu Jabal (died 1883), Egyptian military and political leader
- Isma'il ibn Jafar, Imam of Ismaili Shia's
- Ismail Jakobs (born 1999), Senegalese footballer
- Ismail Jan, Pakistani footballer
- Ismail al-Jazari (1136–1206), Arab engineer and artist
- Ismail Jilani, Pakistani director, film maker, media activist, and Pakistani Army officer
- Ismail Jilaoui (born 1978), Moroccan dressage rider
- Ismail Johari (1947–2017), Malaysian author
- Ismail Juma (1991–2017), Tanzanian long-distance runner
- Ismail Jumaih (born 1991), Maldivian performer
- Ismail Jussa (born 1971), Zanzibari politician
- Ismail Kadare (1936–2024), Albanian novelist, poet, essayist, and playwright
- Ismail Kalebudde (1937–2024), Indian politician
- Ismail Kamara (born 1997), Sierra Leonean sprinter
- Ismail Kamoka (born 1966), Libyan diplomat
- Ismail Al-Karaghouli (born 1943), Iraqi wrestler
- Ismail Kassim (1959–2023), Malaysian politician
- Ismail Katamba (born 1987), Ugandan weightlifter
- Ismail Keta (born 1976), Albanian kickboxer
- Ismail Khafi (born 1995), Moroccan footballer
- Ismail al-Khalfan (born 1981), Syrian academic and professor
- Ismail Khalidi (1916–1968), Palestinian writer and diplomat
- Ismail Khalidi (writer) (born 1982), American dramatist
- Ismail Khalil (born 1957), Iraqi boxer
- Ismail Khalinbekov (born 1985), Russian footballer
- Ismail Khan (born 1946), Afghan politician and former warlord
- Ismail Khan (fighter) (born 2002), Pakistani mixed martial artist
- Ismail Khan (Moghul khan), Khan of Yarkand and Kashgar
- Ismail Khan (Pakistani politician), Pakistani politician
- Ismail Khan of Bengal, Bengali nobleman
- Ismail Hossain Khan, Indian politician
- Ismail Khan Ibrahim Khan (1905–2000), Malaysian barrister and judge
- Ismail Khandan, ruler of Khwarazm
- Ismail Sulemanji Khatri (1937–2014), Indian craftsman
- Ismail Kijo (1952–2021), Malaysian politician
- Ismail Korgoloyev (born 1994), Russian footballer
- Ismail Kouha (born 1983), Moroccan footballer
- Ismail Lasim (born 1963), Malaysian politician
- Ismail Lghazaoui (born 1990), Moroccan human rights activist and agricultural engineer
- Ismail Liban (born 2001), Somali footballer
- Ismail Lika, Kosovar-Albanian mobster
- Ismail Lleshi (born 1947), Albanian politician
- Ismail Mačev (1960–2019), Macedonian sprinter
- Ismail Mahdi (born 2003), American football running back
- Ismail Mahfooz, Maldivian footballer
- Ismail Mahomed (1931–2000), South African judge
- Ismail Marahimin (1934–2008), Indonesian writer
- Ismail Mardanli (born 1987), Qatari footballer
- Ismail Marjan (1920–1991), Malayan-Singaporean badminton player
- Ismail Marzuki (1914–1958), Indonesian composer, songwriter, and musician
- Ismail Mashal (born 1986), Afghan educator
- Ismail Matar (born 1983), Emirati footballer
- Ismail ibn Musa Menk (born 1975), Zimbabwean Islamic scholar
- Ismail Merathi (1844–1917), Indian poet and educationist
- Ismail Merchant (1936–2005), Indian film producer
- Ismail Hasan Metareum (1929–2005), Indonesian politician
- Isma'il Mexsut (1932–2017), Chinese politician
- Ismail Oulad M'Hand (born 2005), Dutch footballer
- Ismail al-Khalidi al-Minangkabawi, Indonesian Islamic scholar
- Ismail Mire (1862–1950), Somali commander and poet
- Ismail Mohamed, multiple people
- Ismail Hassan Mohamed (1936–2026), Egyptian economist
- Ismail Selim Mohamed (born 1944), Egyptian basketball player
- Ismail Mohammad, Bangladeshi screenwriter, dialogue, and story writer
- Ismail Mohammed (football coach) (1922–2008), Iraqi footballer
- Ismail Molla (1938–2020), Greek politician
- Ismail Moutaraji (born 2000), Moroccan footballer
- Ismail Mudashir (born 1980), Nigerian journalist
- Ismail ibn Abd Allah ibn Abi al-Muhajir (683–754), governor of North Africa under the Umayyad Caliphate
- Isma'il Muntasir (died 1005), Samanid prince
- Isma'il ibn Musa (fl. ca. 850–889), lord in Al-Andalus
- Ismail Musukaev (born 1993), Hungarian freestyle wrestler
- Ismail Muttalib (born 1954), Malaysian politician
- Ismail Qasim Naji (born 1969), Somali politician
- Ismail Khan Nakhchivanski (1819–1909), Russian Imperial army officer
- Ismail Nanoua (died 2017), Lebanese actor
- Ismail Nasiruddin of Terengganu (1907–1979), Sultan of Terengganu
- Ismail Naurdiev (born 1996), Austrian mixed martial arts fighter
- Ismail Ndroqi (1876–1944), Albanian politician and philosopher
- Ismail Nikoçi (1876–1919), Albanian political activist
- Ismail ibn Yasar al-Nisai (died 750), Persian poet
- Ismail Haji Nour, Somaliland politician
- Ismail Ogama (born 1985), Ugandan politician
- Ismail Omar (born 1953), Malaysian police officer
- Ismail Omar (footballer) (born 1992), Saudi footballer
- Ismail Omar (general) (born 1941), Malaysian military officer
- Ismail Adan Osman, Somaliland politician
- Ismail Jim'ale Osoble, Somali lawyer and politician
- Ismail Othman (born 1956), Malaysian politician
- Isma'il Pasha of Egypt (1830–1895), Khedive of Egypt
- Ismail Pasha (Tripolitanian), Ottoman statesman
- Isma'il Ayyub Pasha (died 1884), Egyptian administrator
- Ismail Fazıl Pasha (1856–1921), Turkish politician
- Isma'il Kamil Pasha (1795–1822), Egyptian general
- Ismail Selim Pasha (1809–1867), Egyptian general
- Ismail Sirri Pasha (1861–1937), Egyptian engineer and politician
- Ismail Patel (born 1962), British optician
- Ismail Petra of Kelantan (1949–2019), Sultan of Kelantan
- Ismail Poonawala (born 1937), Indian academic
- Ismail al-Qabbani (1898–1963), Egyptian educationalist
- Ismail Khan Qashqai (died 1779), Qashqai chieftain
- Ismail Qemali (1844–1919), Albanian politician and statesman
- Ismail Rabee (born 1983), Emirati footballer
- Ismail Rafaat (1912–2004), Egyptian footballer
- Ismail Ragab (1921–??), Egyptian weightlifter
- Ismail Rage (born 1953), Tanzanian politician
- Ismail Abdul Rahman (1915–1973), Malaysian politician
- Ismail Rahoo (born 1962), Pakistani politician
- Ismail Rama (1935–2022), Albanian sport shooter
- Ismail Ramsey, American lawyer
- Ismail Rasheed (born 1976), Maldivian film actor and director
- Ismail Khilath Rasheed, Maldivian blogger
- Ismail Abdul Razak (born 1989), Ghanaian footballer
- Ismail Riahi (1907–2000), Iranian military officer
- Ismail Richards, South African politician
- Ismail Al-Sabiani (born 1989), Saudi sprinter
- Ismail as-Sadr (1842–1919/20), Lebanese Grand Ayatollah
- Ismail Sahardiid, Somali military official
- Ismail Sait (1859–1934), Indian banker, businessman, and Muslim community leader
- Ismail al-Salabi, Libyan Islamist militant leader
- Ismail Saleh (1926–2008), Indonesian attorney
- Ismail Salleh (born 1963), Malaysian politician
- Ismail Samani (849–907), Amir of the Samanids
- Ismail Sani (born 1967), Malaysian politician
- Ismail Sassi (born 1991), Tunisian footballer
- Ismail Semed (died 2007), Uighur activist
- Ismail Serageldin (born 1944), Egyptian academic
- Ismail Shafeeu (born 1980), Maldivian politician
- Ismail Shafeeu (politician), (born 1956). Maldivian politician
- Ismail El Shafei (born 1947), Egyptian tennis player
- Ismail Shah (footballer) (born 1971), Maldivian footballer
- Ismail Adil Shah (1498–1534), Sultan of Bijapur
- Ismail Shahid (born 1955), Pakistani actor and comedian
- Ismail Shammout (1930–2006), Palestinian painter and art historian
- Ismail Abu Shanab (1950–2003), Palestinian politician
- Ismail Ibn Sharif (1645–1727), Moroccan sultan
- Ismail Mohammed Sharif (born 1962), Iraqi footballer
- Ismail Khudr Al-Shatti (born 1949), Kuwaiti journalist
- Ismail Sirajuddin Shirvani (1782/83–1848), Shirvani Islamic scholar, philosopher, and Naqshbandi sheikh
- Ismail ibn Shuab, ruler of the Emirate of Tiflis
- Ismail Siddiq (1830–1876), Egyptian politician
- Ismail Ould Bedde Ould Cheikh Sidiya (born 1961), Mauritanian politician
- Ismail Sidky (1875–1950), Egyptian politician
- Ismail Sillakh (born 1985), Ukrainian boxer
- Ismail Hossain Siraji (1880–1931), Bengali royal
- Ismail Smith-Wade-El (born 1989/90), American politician
- Ismail Strazimiri (1868–1943), Albanian resistance member
- Ismail Suko (1932–2011), Indonesian politician
- Ismail Hossain Talukder (died 2014), Bangladeshi politician
- Ismail Tara (1949–2022), Pakistani actor and comedian
- Ismail Haki Tatzati (1873–1945), Albanian military commander and politician
- Ismail Thomas (born 1955), Indonesian politician
- Ismail Tiliwaldi (born 1944), Chinese politician
- Ismail Tipi (1959–2023), Turkish-born German journalist and politician
- Ismail Tkhagush (1920–1943), Soviet Circassian soldier
- Ismail Tosun (born 1975), Turkish-Australian chef
- Ismail ibn Tughtekin, Ayyubid ruler of Yemen
- Ismail Fatah Al Turk (died 2004), Iraqi painter and sculptor
- Ismail Vadi (born 1960), South African politician
- Ismail Asif Waheed (born 1968), Maldivian sprinter
- Ismail Wajeeh (born 1962), Maldivian actor and choreographer
- Ismail Watenga (born 1995), Ugandan footballer
- Ismail Yaacob (1949–2009), Malaysian politician
- Ismail Sabri Yaakob (born 1960), Malaysian politician
- Ismail Yakubu (born 1985), Nigerian footballer
- Ismail Yasinov (1916–2010), Chinese agronomist and politician
- Ismail Yassine (1912–1972), Egyptian actor
- Ismail Youssef (born 1964), Egyptian football manager
- Ismail Yunos (born 1986), Singaporean footballer
- Ismail Yuseinov (born 1948), Bulgarian wrestler
- Isma'il ibn Yusuf (died 866), Hasanid Alid rebel
- Ismail Yusupov (1914–2005), Soviet-Kazakh politician
- Ismail Al-Zaabi (born 2001), Emirati footballer
- Ismail al-Zahir (died 1043), Dhulnunid Emir of Toledo Taifa
- Ismail Khan Ziyadkhanov (1867–1920), Azerbaijani politician
- Ismail H. A. Ziyaeddin (1912–1996), Crimean Tatar poet

=== Ishmail ===
- Ishmail Wainright (born 1994), American-Ugandan basketball player

=== İsmail ===
- İsmail Acar (born 1971), Turkish painter
- İsmail Akbay (1930–2003), Turkish scientist
- İsmail Akçay (born 1942), Turkish athlete
- İsmail Rüştü Aksal (1911–1989), Turkish civil servant and politician
- İsmail Akşoy (born 1989), Turkish cyclist
- İsmail Arca (born 1948), Turkish footballer and manager
- İsmail Ateş (born 1960), Turkish artist and professor
- İsmail Baydil (born 1988), Turkish footballer
- İsmail Çağlar Bayırcı (born 1984), Turkish politician
- İsmail Bayram (born 1954), Turkish weightlifter
- İsmail Beşikçi (born 1939), Turkish scholar
- İsmail Bilen (1902–1983), Turkish politician
- İsmail Budak (born 1992), German footballer
- İsmail Cem (1940–2007), Turkish politician
- İsmail Çipe (born 1995), Turkish footballer
- İsmail Çokçalış (born 2000), Turkish footballer
- İsmail Demirci (born 1984), Turkish actor
- İsmail Demiriz (born 1962), Turkish footballer and manager
- İsmail Dümbüllü (1897–1973), Turkish comedy actor
- İsmail Zühdi Efendi, Ottoman calligrapher
- İsmail Erez (1919–1975), Turkish diplomat
- İsmail Ertekin (born 1959), Turkish footballer
- İsmail Fenni Ertuğrul (1855–1946), Turkish politician
- İsmail Faikoğlu (born 1965), Turkish wrestler
- İsmail Firdevs (1888–1937), Crimean Tatar Bolshevik revolutionary
- İsmail Galib (1848–1895), Ottoman numismatist
- İsmail Özgür Göktaş (born 1989), Turkish footballer
- İsmail Güldüren (born 1979), Turkish footballer
- İsmail Güven (born 1994), Turkish footballer
- İsmail Güzel (born 1986), Turkish Greco-Roman wrestler
- İsmail Hacıoğlu (born 1985), Turkish actor
- İsmail Hakkı, multiple people
- İsmail Hüsrev, Turkish journalist
- İsmail Kahraman (born 1940), Turkish politician
- İsmail Kartal (born 1961), Turkish footballer
- İsmail Keleş (born 1988), Turkish sport shooter
- İsmail Konuk (born 1988), Turkish footballer
- İsmail Köse (born 1996), Turkish footballer
- İsmail Köybaşı (born 1989), Turkish footballer
- İsmail Küçükkaya (born 1970), Turkish journalist, news anchor, and writer
- İsmail Kurt (1934–2017), Turkish footballer
- İsmail Müştak Mayakon (1882–1938), Turkish politician
- İsmail Nezir (born 2003), Turkish hurdler and sprinter (born 2003), Turkish hurdler and sprinter
- İsmail Haktan Odabaşı (born 1991), Turkish footballer
- İsmail Ogan (1933–2022), Turkish sport wrestler
- İsmail Özdağlar (born 1950), Turkish politician
- İsmail Özdemir (born 1985), Turkish politician
- İsmail Özden (1952–2018), Turkish-Kurdish rebel
- İsmail Şahmalı (born 1982), Turkish footballer
- İsmail Ege Şaşmaz (born 1993), Turkish actor
- İsmail Saymaz (born 1980), Turkish journalist
- İsmail Selen (1931–1991), Turkish general
- İsmail Metin Temel (born 1958), Turkish general
- İsmail Temiz (born 1954), Turkish wrestler
- İsmail Türüt (born 1965), Turkish singer
- İsmail Cem Ulusoy (born 1996), Turkish basketball player
- İsmail YK (born 1978), Turkish-German singer
- İsmail Yüksek (born 1999), Turkish footballer
- İsmail Zehir (born 2003), Turkish footballer

=== Ismaïl ===
- Ismaïl Aaneba (born 1999), French footballer
- Ismaïl Aissati (born 1988), Moroccan footballer
- Ismaïl Ayoune (born 1987), Moroccan cyclist
- Ismaïl Belkacemi (born 1993), Algerian footballer
- Ismaïl Bouneb (born 2006), French footballer
- Ismaïl Fathali (born 1958), Tunisian general
- Ismaïl Omar Guelleh (born 1946), Djiboutian politician
- Ismaïl Haddou (born 1996), Algerian footballer
- Ismaïl Khelil (1932–2017), Tunisian politician
- Ismaïl Mansouri (born 1988), Algerian footballer
- Ismaïl Moalla (born 1990), Tunisian volleyball player
- Ismaïl Ouro-Agoro (born 1996), Togolese footballer
- Ismaïl Sassi (born 1991), French footballer
- Ismaïl Sbaï (born 1980), Moroccan racing driver
- Ismaïl Seydi (born 2001), French footballer
- Ismaïl Sghyr (born 1972), French-Moroccan long-distance runner
- Ismaïl Yıldırım (born 1990), Dutch footballer

== Surname ==
=== Esmail ===
- Sam Esmail (born 1977), Egyptian-American screenwriter

=== Ismail ===
- Abdul Fattah Ismail (1934–1986), Yemeni politician
- Adel Ismail (historian) (1928–2010), Lebanese diplomat and historian
- Ahmed Abu Ismail (1915–2013), Egyptian economist and politician
- Asif Ismail (born 1970), Indian tennis player
- Atik Ismail (born 1957), Finnish footballer
- Dhurgham Ismail (born 1994), Iraqi footballer
- Gorgis Ismail (1943–2025), Iraqi footballer
- Gulalai Ismail (born 1986), Pashtun women's rights activist
- Hamid Ismail (born 1986), Qatari footballer
- Hesham Ismail (born 1969), American football player
- Ibrahim Artan Ismail, Somali politician
- Ignatius Ismail, Syriac Orthodox patriarch of Mardin
- Mahmoud Ismail (1914–1983), Egyptian actor and filmmaker
- Mourad Ismail (born 1944), Egyptian mathematician
- Mustafa Ismail (1905–1978), Egyptian Qur'an reciter
- Mustafa Osman Ismail (born 1955), Sudanese politician
- Nabawi Ismail (1925–2009), Egyptian politician
- Qadir Ismail (born 2000), American football player
- Qadry Ismail (born 1970), American football player
- Raghib Ismail (born 1969), American football player
- Rami Ismail (born 1988), Dutch game developer
- Saifuddin Nasution Ismail (born 1963), Malaysian politician
- Salma Ismail (1918–2014), Malaysian doctor
- Sariamin Ismail (1909–1995), Indonesian novelist
- Shabnim Ismail (born 1988), South African cricketer
- Shaker Ismail (born 1927), Iraqi footballer
- Sherif Ismail (1955–2023), Egyptian engineer and politician
- Sulaiman Ismail, American football player
- Taufiq Ismail (born 1935), Indonesian poet and activist
- Usmar Ismail (1921–1971), Indonesian film director, author, journalist, and revolutionary

== See also ==
- Sultan Ismail
- Ismail (disambiguation)
