= Ismael (given name) =

Ismael is a masculine given name of Arabic origin. Notable people with the name include:

== Given name ==
- Ismael (footballer, born 1938) (1938–2009), Brazilian footballer
- Ismael (footballer, born 1948) (1948–2010), Brazilian footballer
- Ismael (footballer, born 1983) (born 1983), Brazilian footballer
- Ismael Abubakar Jr. (1949–2017), Filipino politician
- Ismael Ahmed (1947–2026), American politician
- Ismael Ahmed (footballer, born 1989) (born 1989), Emirati footballer
- Ismael Alexandrino (born 1983), Brazilian politician
- Ismael Alicea (1954–2015), Puerto Rican librarian
- Ismael Alvarado (born 1980), Peruvian footballer
- Ismael Álvarez (footballer) (born 2007), Spanish footballer
- Ismael Álvarez (politician) (born 1950), Spanish politician
- Ismael Alvariza (1897–??), Brazilian footballer
- Ismael Athuman (born 1995), Spanish footballer
- Ismael Avila (born 1949), Mexican racewalker
- Ismael Babouk (1841–1920), Circassian-Jordanian aristocrat
- Ismael Jorge Balea (born 1993), Uruguayan footballer
- Ismael Balkhi (1918–1968), Afghan political activist
- Ismael Bangoura (footballer, born 1985) (born 1985), Guinean footballer
- Ismael Aguilar Barajas, Mexican academic
- Ismael Barea (born 2005), Spanish footballer
- Ismael Barragán (born 1986), Spanish footballer
- Ismael Barroso (born 1983), Venezuelan boxer
- Ismael Bekhoucha (born 2004), Spanish footballer
- Ismael Benavides (born 1945), Peruvian politician
- Ismael Benegas (born 1987), Paraguayan footballer
- Ismael Benktib (born 1998), Spanish-Moroccan footballer
- Ismael Bielich-Flores (1897–1966), Peruvian lawyer and politician
- Ismael Blanco (born 1983), Argentine footballer
- Ismael Bolívar (born 1989), Spanish footballer
- Ismael Borrero (born 1992), Cuban wrestler
- Ismael Perdomo Borrero (1872–1950), Colombian Roman Catholic archbishop
- Ismael Burgueño (born 1983), Mexican politician, teacher, and lawyer
- Ismael Carbonell (born 1959), Cuban rower
- Ismael 'East' Carlo (born 1942) Puerto Rican actor
- Ismael Carrasco (1882–1946), Chilean military officer and politician
- Ismael Casas (born 2001), Spanish footballer
- Ismael Cerna (1856–1901), Guatemalan poet
- Ismael Clemente (born 1970), Spanish entrepreneur and financial executive
- Ismael Estrada Colín (born 1953), Mexican politician
- Ismael Cruz Córdova (born 1987), Puerto Rican actor
- Ismael Cortinas (politician) (1884–1940), Uruguayan political figure, journalist, and playwright
- Ismael Crespo (born 1964), Spanish political scientist
- Ismael Fernández de la Cuesta (born 1939), Spanish vocalist and musicologist
- Ismael Debjani (born 1990), Belgian middle-distance runner
- Ismael Delgado (1929–2023), Puerto Rican sprinter
- Ismael Diawara (born 1994), Swedish-Malian footballer
- Ismael Diaz, multiple people
- Ismael Dunga (born 1993), Kenyan footballer
- Ismael Durán (1949–2021), Chilean singer-songwriter
- Ismael Dyfan (died 2001), Sierra Leonean footballer
- Ismael Ehui (born 1986), French footballer
- Ismael Espiga (born 1978), Uruguayan footballer
- Ismael Esteban (born 1983), Spanish cyclist
- Ismael Fadel (born 2004), Spanish-Moroccan footballer
- Ismael Falcón (born 1984), Spanish footballer
- Ismael Figaredo (1887–1964), Spanish entrepreneur and sports leader
- Ismael Flores, American politician
- Ismael Fuentes (born 1981), Chilean footballer
- Ismael García (born 1954), Venezuelan politician
- Ismael Mahmoud Ghassab (born 1961), Jordanian long-distance runner
- Ismael Gibraltar, Ottoman admiral
- Ismael García Gómez (born 1988), Spanish football coach
- Ismael González (born 1978), Mexican boxer
- Ismael Govea (born 1997), Mexican footballer
- Ismael Grasa (born 1968), Spanish writer
- Ismael Gushein (1936–2016), Guinean politician
- Ismael Gutiérrez (born 2000), Spanish footballer
- Ismael Al-Harbi (born 1998), Emirati footballer
- Ismael Hernández (born 1964), Mexican politician
- Ismael Hernández (athlete) (born 1946), Mexican racewalker
- Ismael Hernández (pentathlete) (born 1990), Mexican modern pentathlete
- Ismael Hossein-zadeh, Iranian-American economist
- Ismael Huerta (1916–1997), Chilean admiral and politician
- Ismael Íñiguez (born 1981), Mexican football coach and player
- Ismael Pereira Íñiguez (1881–1925), Chilean politician, lawyer, and diplomat
- Ismael El Iraki (born 1983), French-Moroccan filmmaker
- Ismael Al-Jasmi (born 1989), Emirati footballer
- Ismael Ordaz Jiménez (born 1951), Mexican politician
- Ismael Kanater (1956/57–2026), Moroccan actor
- Ismael Kiram II (1939–2015), Filipino Sultan
- Ismael Kirui (born 1975), Kenyan long-distance runner
- Ismael Kombich (born 1985), Kenyan track and field athlete
- Ismael Koné (boxer) (born 1974), Swedish boxer
- Ismael Kurtz, Brazilian football manager
- Ismael Laguna (1943–2026), Panamanian boxer
- Ismael Lares (died 1926), Mexican Army officer
- Ismael Betancourt Lebron (1930–2014), Puerto Rican lawyer
- Ismael Lejarreta (born 1953), Spanish racing cyclist
- Ismael Lekbab (born 1999), Portuguese footballer
- Ismael Londt (born 1985), Surinamese-Dutch kickboxer
- Ismael López (footballer, born 1978) (born 1978), Spanish footballer
- Ismael Loutfi (born 1992/93), American comedian
- Ismael Pereira Lyon (1911–2007), Chilean farmer and politician
- Ismael Al-Maghrebi (born 1991), Saudi footballer
- Ismael Mallari, Filipino writer
- Ismael Martínez (born 1956), Puerto Rican boxer
- Ismael Martins (born 1940), Angolan diplomat and politician
- Ismael El Massoudi (born 1978), Moroccan-French boxer
- Ismael Edwards Matte (1891–1954), Chilean architect and politician
- Ismael Mengs (1688–1764), Danish painter
- Ismael Merlo (1918–1984), Spanish actor
- Ismael Miranda (born 1950), Puerto Rican singer and songwriter
- Ismael Mokadem (born 1995), Moroccan footballer
- Ismael Montes (1861–1933), Bolivian general and politician
- Ismael Morandini (1978–2010), Argentine playwright and theatre actor
- Ismael García Moreno (born 1975), Spanish wheelchair basketball player
- Ismael Mosqueira (1911–1966), Mexican gymnast
- Ismael Narib, Namibian footballer
- Ismael Nery (1900–1934), Brazilian artist
- Ismael Nurmamade (born 1991), Mozambican basketball player
- Ismael Oketokoun (born 2006), Spanish footballer
- Ismael Warleta y Ordovás (1836–1898), Spanish Navy officer
- Ismael Orot, Ugandan politician
- Ismael Ortega (born 1994), Paraguayan footballer
- Ismael Ortiz (born 1982), Panamanian swimmer
- Ismael Páez (born 1950), Mexican pool and card player
- Ismael Parraguez (1883–1917), Chilean musician, teacher, poet, and novelist
- Ismael Pérez Pazmiño (1876–1944), Ecuadorian journalist
- Ismael Moreno Pino (1927–2013), Mexican lawyer, diplomat, and author
- Ismael Quílez (born 1988), Argentine footballer
- Ismael Quintana (1937–2016), Puerto Rican singer and composer
- Ismael Ramzi (1917–2000), Egyptian diver
- Ismael Rescalvo (born 1982), Spanish football manager and player
- Ismael Rivera (1931–1987), Puerto Rican composer and singer
- Ismael Rivera (archer) (born 1951), Puerto Rican archer
- Ismael Rodríguez (1917–2004), Mexican film director
- Ismael Rodríguez (footballer) (born 1981), Mexican footballer
- Ismael Rolón (1914–2010), Paraguayan Roman Catholic archbishop
- Ismael Romero (born 1991), Cuban-Puerto Rican basketball player
- Ismael García Roque (born 1984), Spanish equestrian
- Ismael La Rosa (born 1977), Peruvian actor
- Ismael Ruiz (born 1977), Spanish footballer
- Ismael Saibari (born 2001), Spanish-Moroccan footballer
- Ismael Sánchez (born 1982), Dominican cyclist
- Ismael Sanogo (born 1996), Ivorian basketball player
- Ismael Santos (born 1972), Spanish basketball player
- Ismael Sarmiento (born 1973), Colombian road cyclist
- Ismael Sauce (born 1951), Venezuelan tennis player
- Ismael Saz (born 1952), Spanish historian
- Ismael Serrano (born 1974), Spanish singer-songwriter and guitarist
- Ismael Shah (1962–1992), Pakistani film and TV actor
- Ismael Zambada Sicairos (born 1982), Mexican drug trafficker
- Ismael Silva (footballer) (born 1994), Brazilian footballer
- Ismael Silva (musician) (1905–1978), Brazilian samba musician
- Ismael Sosa (born 1987), Argentine footballer
- Ismael Lea South, English rapper, community activist, and youth worker
- Ismael Sueno (born 1947/48), Filipino politician
- Ismael Tajouri-Shradi (born 1994), Swiss-Libyan footballer
- Ismael Thajeb (1917–1983), Indonesian diplomat
- Ismael Tocornal (1850–1929), Chilean politician and diplomat
- Ismael del Toro (born 1975), Mexican lawyer and politician
- Ismael Torres (1952–2003), Argentine cyclist
- Ismael Undurraga (1888–1926), Chilean businessman and politician
- Ismael Urbain (1812–1884), French journalist and interpreter
- Ismael Urtubi (born 1961), Spanish footballer
- Ismael Urzaiz (born 1971), Spanish footballer
- Ismael Valadéz (born 1985), Mexican footballer
- Ismael Valdéz (born 1973), Mexican baseball player
- Ismael Peraza Valdez (born 1967), Mexican politician
- Ismael Valenzuela (1934–2009), American horse racing jockey
- Ismael Vázquez (1865–1930), Bolivian lawyer, orator, and politician
- Ismael Vicuña (1877–1933), Chilean farmer, politician, and diplomat
- Ismael Villegas (born 1976), Puerto Rican baseball player
- Ismael Yacouba (born 1993), Nigerien taekwondo practitioner

== See also ==
- Ismael
