= Ysmael =

Ysmael may refer to:

- Ysmael R. Villegas (1924–1945), Mexican-American Medal of Honor recipient
- Ysmael Steel Admirals, basketball team located in Manila, Philippines from 1958 to 1968

== See also ==
- Ismael (disambiguation)
- Ismaël
- Isfael, Welsh bishop and saint
- Ishmael (disambiguation)
- Ismail (disambiguation)
- Ismail (name)
