= Ismael =

Ismael may refer to:

== People ==
- Ismael (given name), people associated with this name

== Other uses ==
- Ismael, Sar-e Pol, a village in Afghanistan
- Ismael (film), a 2013 Spanish film
- Ismael (novel), a 1977 novel by Klas Östergren

== See also ==
- Ismaël
- Ysmael (disambiguation)
- Isfael, Welsh bishop and saint
- Ishmael (disambiguation)
- Ismail (disambiguation)
- Ismail (name)
