= Ishmael (disambiguation) =

Ishmael is the first child of Abraham in Abrahamic religions.

Ishmael may also refer to:

== People ==
- Ishmael son of Nethaniah, the murderer of Gedaliah, Nebuchadnezzar II's provincial governor
- Ishmael ben Elisha, more commonly "Rabbi Ishmael", 2nd-century rabbi
- Ishmael ben Jose, 3rd-century rabbi, the son of Jose ben Halafta
- Saint Isfael, a 6th-century Breton prince and Welsh saint also known as Ismael and Ishmael
- Ishmael Beah (born 1980), Sierra Leonean author and former child soldier
- Ishmael Davis (born 1995), English professional boxer
- Ishmael Hyman (born 1995), American football player
- Ismail Kadare (1936—2024), Albanian novelist and poet
- Ishmael Kipkurui (born 2005), Kenyan middle- and long-distance runner
- Ishmael Noko, General Secretary of the Lutheran World Federation since 1995
- Ishmael Reed (born 1938), American poet, essayist and novelist
- Nola Ishmael (born 1943), Barbadian nurse
- Prophet Ishmael, Zimbabwean religious leader

== Fictional characters ==
- Ishmael (Book of Mormon), a figure in the Book of Mormon
- Ishmael (Moby-Dick), the narrator in the novel Moby-Dick by Herman Melville
- Ishmael, a "mad" character with apparent mystical powers in Ingmar Bergman's film Fanny and Alexander
- Ishmael, the wizard who imprisoned the goblins in Goblins in the Castle by Bruce Coville
- Ishmael, the main protagonist in The Haj, a 1984 novel by Leon Uris
- Ishmael (character), the name of two fictional characters in DC Comics
- Ishmael, a character in the 2023 video game Limbus Company based on the character from Moby-Dick

== Literature ==
- Ishmael (Quinn novel), a 1992 philosophical novel by Daniel Quinn
- Ishmael (Southworth novel), an 1876 novel by E.D.E.N. Southworth
- Ishmael (Star Trek), a Star Trek novel by Barbara Hambly
- Ishmael, a chapbook by Peter Straub

== Places ==
- Ismael, Sar-e Pol, a village in Afghanistan
- Ishmael, Missouri, a ghost town in the United States

== See also ==
- St Ishmaels
- Ismael (disambiguation)
- Ismail (disambiguation)
- Ismaël
- Ismayil
- Ishamael
- Isfael
