= Ismail (disambiguation) =

Ismail is the first son of the religious figure Abraham.

Ismail may refer to:

- Ismail (name), people with the name
- Sultan Ismail (disambiguation), various rulers
- Ismail County, a former county of Romania
- Izmail (Romanian: Ismail), a historic town formerly in Romania now in Ukraine
- Ismael, Sar-e Pol, in Sangcharak District at Sar-e Pol Province of Afghanistan
- Russian torpedo boat Ismail, the escort to Russian battleship Potemkin and the first to join the latter's mutiny in 1905
- Ismail I, first king of the Safavid dynasty
- İsmail, Hınıs

== See also ==
- Izmail-class battlecruiser, a class of Russian battlecruisers built in the 1910s
- Ismael (disambiguation)
- Ishmael (disambiguation)
