= Sergio Munoz =

Sergio Munoz may refer to:

- Sergio Munoz (politician) (born 1982), Democratic member of the Texas House of Representatives
- Sergio Muñoz (gymnast) (born 1989), Spanish gymnast
- Sergio Garrote Muñoz (born 1979), Spanish Para-cyclist
