= Ismaël =

- Gender: Male

Other names
- Related names: Ismail, Ishmael

Ismaël is a given name or surname, and may refer to:

- Ismaël Aaneba (born 1999), French footballer
- Ismaël Alassane (born 1984), Nigerian football defender
- Ismaël Ankobo (born 1997), Congolese footballer
- Farhad Ismaël Aumeer, Mauritian politician
- Ismaël Bako (born 1995), Belgian basketball player
- Ismaël Bamba (born 1987), Canadian football player
- Ismaël Bangoura (born 1985), Guinean footballer
- Ismaël Karba Bangoura (born 1994), Guinean footballer
- Ismaël Benahmed (born 1989), French footballer
- Ismaël Bennacer (born 1997), Algerian footballer
- Ismaël Boura (born 2000), Comorian footballer
- Ismaël Bouzid (born 1983), Algerian footballer
- Ismaël Bullialdus (1605–1695), French astronomer
- Ismaël Camara (born 2000), Guinean footballer
- Ismaël Coulibaly (born 1992), Ivorian taekwondo practitioner
- Ismaël Diallo (born 1997), Ivorian footballer
- Ismaël Diomandé (footballer, born 1992), Ivorian footballer
- Ismaël Diomandé (footballer, born 2003), Ivorian footballer
- Ismaël Doukouré (born 2003), French footballer
- Ismaël Emelien (born 1987), French political advisor
- Ismaël Ferroukhi (born 1962), French-Moroccan film director
- Ismaël Béko Fofana (born 1988), Ivorian footballer
- Ismaël Gharbi (born 2004), Spanish footballer
- Ismaël Habib (born 1988), Canadian criminal, first person convicted of leaving the country to join a terrorist organization
- Ismaël Haddou (born 1996), Algerian footballer
- Ismaël Isaac (born 1966), Ivorian reggae musician
- Ismaël Kamagate (born 2001), French basketball player
- Ismaël Kanda (born 2000), French footballer
- Ismaël Kandouss (born 1997), Moroccan footballer
- Ismaël Keïta (born 1990), Malian footballer
- Ismaël Kip (born 1987), Dutch cyclist
- Ismaël Koné (born 2002), Canadian soccer player
- Ismaël Koudou (born 1975), Burkinabé footballer
- Ismaël de Lesseps (1871–1915), French fencer
- Ismaël Lô (born 1956), Senegalese musician
- Ismaël N'Diaye (born 1982), Ivorian basketball player
- Ismaël Ouedraogo (born 1991), Burkinabé footballer
- Ismael Sarmiento (born 1973), Colombian cyclist
- Ismaël Tidjani Serpos, Beninese politician
- Ismaël Touré (1925/26–1985), Guinean politician
- Ismaël Traoré (born 1986), Ivorian footballer
- Ismaël "Smahi" Triki (born 1967), Moroccan footballer
- Ismael Urzaiz (born 1971), Spanish footballer
- Ismaël Wagué, Malian military officer and political spokesperson
- Ismaël Zagrè (born 1992), Burkinabé footballer
- Ismaël, the stage name of Jean-Vital Jammes (1825–1893), French opera singer
- Valérien Ismaël (born 1975), French footballer

== See also ==
- Hurricane Ismael (disambiguation)
- Ishmael (disambiguation)
