= Llanismel =

Llanismel or Llanishmael is a Welsh placename meaning "church of Saint Ismael". It may refer to either of:

- St Ishmaels in Pembrokeshire
- St Ishmael in Carmarthenshire
