= COVID-19 pandemic in Puntland =

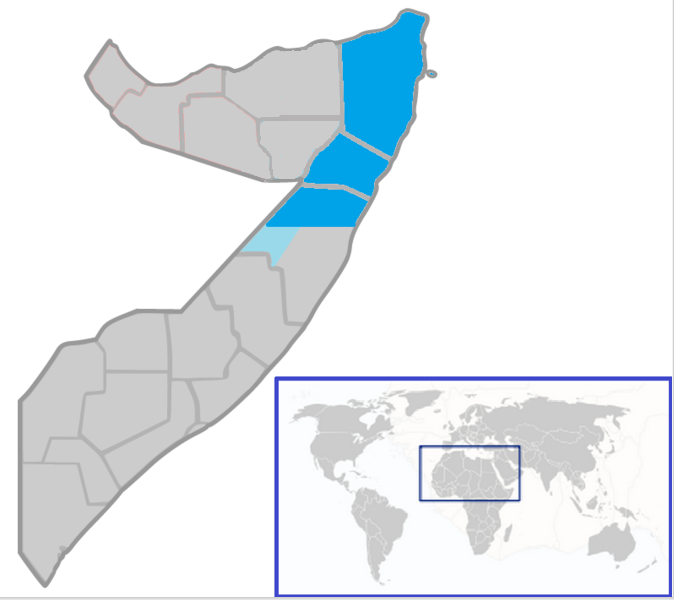
- Disease: COVID-19
- Pathogen: SARS-CoV-2
- Location: Puntland, Somalia

The COVID-19 pandemic was confirmed in April 2020 to have reached Puntland, an autonomous state in northeastern Somalia.

Puntland recorded eleven cases of COVID-19 and at least one fatality due to the virus by May 2, 2020, though Puntland officials believed the actual number of COVID-19 infections to be much higher. Puntland is the region of Somalia with the second highest number of COVID-19 cases, after Banaadir, as of May 25, 2020.

== Timeline ==
=== March 2020 ===
Puntland officials initially declined to close mosques when COVID-19 cases were confirmed in other regions of Somalia in March 2020.

=== April 2020 ===
The first confirmed case and death was reported on 23 April.

=== May 2020 ===
By 2 May there had been 11 confirmed cases of which one death.

By May 2020, several Puntland government ministers and advisors to President of Puntland Said Abdullahi Dani had tested positive for COVID-19. Puntland Health Minister Jama Farah Hassan stated that two Puntland government ministers had tested positive by May 8, 2020. Puntland's Minister of Commerce Abdullahi Abdi Hirsi first reported eye pain, a possible symptom of COVID-19, on May 6, 2020. He sought treatment and was diagnosed with COVID-19 on May 9, 2020. Hirsi had recently toured flood damage in Qardho, where he believes he might have contracted the virus.

By 11 May there had been 84 confirmed cases of which four deaths. A week later the number of confirmed cases had risen to 136.

On May 25, 2020, the Agricultural Ministry announced the death of Puntland's Minister of Agriculture, the Environment, and Climate Change Ismail Gamadiid due to COVID-19. Gamadiid had contracted the coronavirus in Puntland, but had been transferred to a hospital in Mogadishu for treatment for several weeks.

=== September 2020 ===
By mid-September there had been 496 cases of which nine deaths.

=== February 2021 ===
By 8 February there had been 1182 cases. By 26 February the number of confirmed cases had grown to 1349.

== See also ==
- COVID-19 pandemic in Somalia
- COVID-19 pandemic in Africa
- COVID-19 pandemic by country and territory
