= Alicea =

Alicea is a surname. Notable people with the surname include:

- Carolette Alicea, American politician
- Francisco Parés Alicea, Puerto Rican accountant and government official
- Geraldo Alicea (born 1963), American politician
- Ismael Alicea (1954–2015), American librarian
- Jose Alicea Mirabal (born 1967), Puerto Rican basketball player
- Luis Alicea (born 1965), Puerto Rican baseball player
- William Alicea Pérez, Puerto Rican politician

== Fictional characters ==
- Vitin Alicea, a Puerto Rican television and radio character
