= Saint Ishmael =

Saint Ishmael may refer to:

People:

- Isfael, an AD 6th-century medieval Welsh bishop of Rhos and saint

Places:

- St Ishmael, Carmarthenshire, a community (civil parish) in Wales
- St Ishmaels, a village and community in Pembrokeshire, Wales
