= Texas's 36th House of Representatives district =

American legislative district

Texas's 36th State House of Representatives district
Representative
Sergio Muñoz Jr. D–Palmview
since 2011
- Demographics: 5.3% White; 93.4% Hispanic
- Population (2020) • Voting age: 186,731; 131,138

District 36 is a district in the Texas House of Representatives. It was created in the 3rd Legislature (1849–1851).

The district is entirely located within Hidalgo County, accounting for just over a fifth of the counties representation in the chamber. It also includes the cities of Mission, Hidalgo, Palmview, and portions of McAllen and Alton. It has been represented by Sergio Muñoz Jr. since 2011.
