= Adil Biçer =

Turkish politician (born 1974)

Member of the Grand National Assembly of Turkey
- Incumbent
- Assumed office 14 May 2023
- Constituency: Kütahya

Personal details
- Born: 1974 (age 51–52)
- Party: Justice and Development Party

Adil Biçer (born 1974) is a Turkish politician from the Justice and Development Party who was elected to the Grand National Assembly of Turkey from Kütahya in the 2023 Turkish parliamentary election.
