= Ismael Flores =

American politician

Member of the Texas House of Representatives from the 36th district
- In office January 14, 1997 – January 11, 2011
- Preceded by: Sergio Muñoz Sr.
- Succeeded by: Sergio Muñoz Jr.

Personal details
- Born: August 7, 1958 (age 68)
- Party: Democratic
- Spouse: Debra
- Education: University of Texas–Pan American (BA)
- Occupation: Businessman

Ismael "Kino" Flores Sr. (born August 7, 1958) is an American former politician. He served as a Democratic member of the Texas House of Representatives for the 36th district from 1997 to 2011.

== Early life and education ==
Flores was born on August 7, 1958 and earned a Bachelor of Arts from University of Texas-Pan American. He is the son of the late Gumaro "Maro" Flores, who served as the inaugural mayor of Sullivan City after its incorporation in 1997 until being removed by the city council for chronic absenteeism in 2009.

== Texas House of Representatives ==
Flores opted not to seek re-election in the 2010 election after being indicted in an ethics investigation in July 2009.

=== Ethics investigation ===
In October 2009, a Travis County grand jury indicted Flores on six counts for failing to disclose sources of income, gifts received, real estate holdings and sales of certain real properties in his required annual personal financial statements. Court filings reported that Flores was dubbed "Mr. Ten Percent" by business partners because he requested being paid 10 percent of the profit companies earned from the contracts he awarded them. The tampered records dated back to his 2004 statement, with the indictment containing a total of 16 counts of tampering with a governmental record and three counts of perjury. In October 2010, a Travis County jury found Flores guilty on six felony counts.

Flores was ultimately sentenced to serve five years of probation on each of the four felony counts for not properly disclosing his income, two years of probation on each of five misdemeanor charges, in addition to paying a $1,000 fine in 2012.

== Personal life ==
In January 2016, Flores' son, Ismael "Kino" Flores Jr., was sworn in as associate judge of the Title IV-D Master Court 2 in Hidalgo County. His other son, Eric Flores, was the Republican nominee for Texas's 34th congressional district in the 2026 election.

Texas House of Representatives
Preceded by Sergio Muñoz Sr.	Member of the Texas House of Representatives from District 36 (Palmview); 2003 – 2005	Succeeded by Sergio Muñoz Jr.
