= Kütahya (electoral district) =

Electoral district of the Grand National Assembly of Turkey

Coordinates: 39.4167°N 29.9833°E

- electoral district for the Grand National Assembly of Turkey
- Kütahya shown within Turkey
- Province: Kütahya
- Electorate: 418,678

Current electoral district
- Created: 1920
- Seats: 4 Historical: 6 (1995-2011) 5 (1973-1995) 6 (1961-1973) 8 (1954-1961)
- MPs: List: Soner Aksoy AKP Hasan Fehmi Kinay AKP İdris Bal DGP Vural Kavuncu AKP Alim Işık MHP
- Turnout at last election: 91.19%
- Representation
- AK Party: 3 / 4
- MHP: 1 / 4

Kütahya is an electoral district of the Grand National Assembly of Turkey. It elects five members of parliament (deputies) to represent the province of the same name for a four-year term by the D'Hondt method, a party-list proportional representation system.

== Members ==
Population reviews of each electoral district are conducted before each general election, which can lead to certain districts being granted a smaller or greater number of parliamentary seats. At the last election Kütahya's seat allocation fell to five, having been at six since 1995.

MPs for Kütahya, 1999 onwards
Seat	1999 (21st parliament)	2002 (22nd parliament)	2007 (23rd parliament)	2011 (24th parliament)	June 2015 (25th parliament)	November 2015 (25th parliament)	2018 (27th parliament)	2023 (28th parliament)
1	Cevdet Akçalı; DYP	Soner Aksoy; AK Party			Mustafa Şükrü Nazlı; AK Party		Ceyda Çetin Erenler; AK Party	Adil Biçer; AK Party
2	İsmail Karakuyu; DYP	Halil İbrahim Yılmaz; AK Party	Hüseyin Tuğcu; AK Party	Vural Kavuncu; AK Party	Vural Kavuncu; AK Party		Ali Fazıl Kasap; CHP	
3	Ahmet Derin; FP	Hüsnü Ordu; AK Party		İdris Bal; AK Party / DGP	İshak Gazel; AK Party			Mehmet Demir; AK Party
4	Seydi Karakuş; MHP	Alaettin Güven; AK Party	Alim Işık; MHP			Ahmet Tan; AK Party		İsmail Çağlar Bayırcı; AK Party
5	Kadir Görmez; MHP	Hasan Fehmi Kinay; AK Party			No seat	Ahmet Erbaş; MHP		
6	Basri Coşkun; DSP	Abdullah Erdem Cantimur; AK Party	İsmail Hakkı Biçer; AK Party	No seat				

== General elections ==
=== 2011 ===
Unelected candidates in small text.

2011 Turkish general election: Kütahya
List	Candidates	Votes	Of total (%)	± from prev.
AK Party	Mahmut Mücahit Fındıklı, Mustafa Şahin, Öznur Çalık, Hüseyin Cemal Akın, Ömer Faruk Öz	242,125	64.59	
MHP	Alim Işık	59,334	15.83	
CHP	None elected	46,645	12.44	
SAADET	None elected	9292	2.48	
DP	None elected	6529	1.74	
HAS Party	None elected	4046	1.08	N/A
Büyük Birlik	None elected	3264	0.87	
HEPAR	None elected	895	0.24	
DSP	None elected	870	0.23	'"`UNIQ−−ref−0000000E−QINU`"'
MP	None elected	556	0.15	
Labour	None elected	485	0.13	
TKP	None elected	434	0.12	
Nationalist Conservative	None elected	410	0.11	
DYP	None elected	0		
Liberal Democrat	None elected	0		
Turnout		374,885	91.19	

== Presidential elections ==
=== 2014 ===
Presidential Election 2014: Kütahya
Party	Candidate	Votes	%
AK Party	Recep Tayyip Erdoğan	238,850	69.31
Independent	Ekmeleddin İhsanoğlu	101,782	29.54
HDP	Selahattin Demirtaş	3,974	1.15
Total votes		344,606	100.00
Rejected ballots		9,945	2.80
Turnout		354,551	84.97
Recep Tayyip Erdoğan win			
