= Yüsup Eysa =

Chinese Uyghur politician

- يۈسۇپ ئەيسا

Vice Chairman of the Xinjiang Regional Committee of the Chinese People's Political Consultative Conference
- In office January 1998 – January 2003
- Chairman: Janabil

Mayor of Ürümqi
- In office 1987–1994
- Party Secretary: Jie Fuping; Wu Dunfu; Yang Gang
- Preceded by: Isma'il Mexsut
- Succeeded by: Memetimin Zakir

Personal details
- Born: July 1939 (age 86) Shanshan County, Xinjiang, China
- Party: Chinese Communist Party

Chinese name
- Chinese: 玉素甫·艾沙
Transcriptions
Standard Mandarin
- Hanyu Pinyin: Yùsùfǔ Àishā

Yüsup Eysa (Uyghur: يۈسۇپ ئەيسا; Chinese: 玉素甫·艾沙; born July 1939) is a Chinese politician of Uyghur ethnicity who served as mayor of Ürümqi, vice chairman of Xinjiang Uygur Autonomous Region, and vice chairman of the Xinjiang Regional Committee of the Chinese People's Political Consultative Conference. He was a delegate to the 7th National People's Congress.

== Biography ==
Yüsup Eysa was born in Shanshan County, Xinjiang, July 1939. He entered the workforce in October 1955, and joined the Chinese Communist Party in December 1958. He served as deputy party secretary of Turpan before being promoted to mayor of Ürümqi in 1987 and then vice chairman of Xinjiang Uygur Autonomous Region. In January 1998, he was proposed as vice chairman of the Xinjiang Regional Committee of the Chinese People's Political Consultative Conference, the region's top political advisory body.

Government offices
| Preceded by Isma'il Mexsut | Mayor of Ürümqi; 1987–1994 | Succeeded by Memetimin Zakir |
