= Ismael Orot =

Ugandan politician

Member of Parliament for Kanyum County, Kumi District
- Incumbent
- Assumed office 2016

State Minister for Works (designate)
- Incumbent
- Assumed office 6 June 2016

Personal details
- Party: National Resistance Movement
- Occupation: Politician

Ismael Orot is a Ugandan politician. He was named as State Minister for Works in the Ugandan Cabinet on 6 June 2016. However, his appointment was rejected by the parliamentary appointments committee. He served as the elected Member of Parliament for Kanyum County, in Kumi District in the 10th Parliament.

== Controversies ==
Academic credentials

His election and ministerial appointment were shadowed by claims of falsified academic papers. Rivals alleged that he used certificates belonging to Ikadorot John Stephen, though Orot clarified in an affidavit that he changed his name from John Stephen to Ismael upon converting to Islam in 1983.

Taxation advocacy

During his time in parliament, he publicly defended the introduction of taxes on social media (OTT) and mobile money, stating that these are voluntary services and users who could not pay should opt not to use them.

== Personal life ==
=== Family loss ===
In April 2025, Orot's wife, Sarah Alaka died. She was a parish chief in the Kumi district local government and reportedly collapsed before being pronounced dead at Kumi Hospital-Ongino.

== See also ==
- Rose Namayanja
- Persis Namuganza
- Benna Namugwanya
- Frederick Ngobi Gume
