= Ismail Ogama =

Ugandan politician

Hon. Ismail Ali Ogama

Member of Parliament for Lower Madi County, Arua District
- Succeeded by: Afidra Olema Ronald

Personal details
- Born: April 1, 1985 (age 41) Uganda
- Party: National Resistance Movement
- Education: Certified Project Management Professional
- Alma mater: Makerere University (Bachelor of Social Sciences) (PgC in PPM)
- Occupation: Social Scientist, Project Management Professional, Politician
- Known for: Parliamentary service; social science and project management background
- Committees: Committee on Public Service and Local Government

Ismail Ali Ogama (born 1 April 1985) is a Ugandan social scientist, certified Project Management Professional and politician. He served as the elected Member of Parliament for Lower Madi County constituency in Arua District, in 2021elections and a representative for National Resistance Movement, the ruling political party in Uganda. He was also appointed as a presidential adviser. He is a member of the NRM Parliamentary Caucus and serves on the Committee on Public Service and Local Government in the 10th Parliament of Uganda. He lost to Afidra Olema Ronald in the Parliamentary Elections.

== See also ==
- West Nile sub-region
- Faith Alupo
- Judith Alyek
- Susan Amero
- Anita Among
