= Ismael Lares =

Mexican military personnel

- Born: Late 19th Century
- Died: October 1926
- Service years: c. 1916 – October 1926
- Rank: General (Mexico)

Ismael Lares was a Mexican General who participated in the Cristero War.

== Early life ==
Lares was born in the Late 19th Century in Mexico.

== Cristero War ==
Lares arrived from Chihuahua in order to lead the campaign in the state of Durango in 1926. Lares, despite the advice that Colonel Agapito Campos gave him to ambush the next day the enemy forces, opted for battle. In October 1926 he was killed in the port of the Arena by an enemy ambush, along with half of a regiment, about 250 men.
