= Ismail ibn Yasar al-Nisai =

Ismail ibn Yasar al-Nisa'i (Arabic: اسماعیل بن یسار النسائی) was an Arabic-language poet of Persian origin and one of the earliest Shu'ubi poets. His son, Ebrahim, and his brothers, Muhammad and Musa Shahawat were also poets. Al-Nasa'i was born and lived in Medina as a client (mawlā) of Taym b. Morra. He was a descendant of a Persian prisoner of war from Adharbayjan. He initially supported the Zubayrid's cause, but when the cause was crushed and Abd Allah ibn al-Zubayr was killed in 73AH/692CE, Al-Nasa'i attached himself to the court of the Umayyad Caliphate, despite his strong Anti-Arab sentiments.

When he recited a poem for Hisham ibn Abd al-Malik in which he glorified his Persian ancestors without praising the caliph, Hisham punished and exiled him to Hejaz.

Al-Nasa'i died before 132AH/750CE at a very old age and shortly before the fall of the Umayyad dynasty.

== Poems ==
One of his poems:

رب خال متوج لی و عم ماجد مجتدی کریم النصاب

انما سمی الفوارس بالفر سِ مضاهاة رفعة الانساب

فاترکی الفخر یا امام علینا و اترکی الجور و انطقی بالصواب

و اسألی ان جهلت عنا و عنکم کیف کنا فی سالف الاحقاب

اذ نربی بناتنا و تدسو نَ سفاهاً بناتکم فی التراب

Translation:

I have many uncles and cousins, all of whom are noble, generous, and pure.

The word "Favares" is derived from our name (Persian) to be superior to our esteemed race.

Now, Do not be proud and do not oppress us and say the right thing.

And if you are unaware of our past (Iranians) and yourself (Arabs), know how we and you were.

We raised our daughters and you buried your daughters (alive in the grave).

Another poem:

انی وجدک ما عودی بذی خور عندالحفاظ و لاحوضی بهمدوم

اصلی کریم و مجدی لایقاس به ولی لسان کحد السیف مسموم

احمی به مجد اقوام ذوی حسب من کل قرم بتاج الملک معموم

جحاجح ساده بلج مرازبه جرد عتاق مسامیح مطاعیم

من مثل کسری و سابور الجنود معا والهرمزان لفجر او لتعظیم

Translation:

I swear to your ancestor that I am not weak in defense of my honor!

I have great roots and my glory cannot be compared with others! And my tongue is as poisonous as the sharpness of a sword.

With this language, I support the honor of the original (Persian/Iranian) lineage, who were all great and crowned rulers.

Open commanders and chiefs, border guards, pioneers, chosen benefactors and hospitable

Who, like Khosrow (Anoushirvan) and Shapur and Hormozan, deserves praise and strain!
