= Sultan Ismail =

Sultan Ismail may refer to several rulers named Ismail with the title of sultan:

- Sultan Ismail I of Granada
- Sultan Ismail II of Granada
- Sultan Ismail, 25th Sultan of Kelantan (1920-1944)
- Sultan Ismail of Johor, Sultan of Johor (1959-1981)
- Sultan Ismail Muabidin Riayat Shah, Sultan of Perak (1871-1874)
- Sultan Ismail Nasiruddin Shah, fourth Yang di-Pertuan Agong of Malaysia and Sultan of Terengganu (1945-1979)
- Sultan Ismail Petra, 28th Sultan of Kelantan (1979-2010)
- Ismail Ibn Sharif, Sultan of Morocco (1672–1727)
