= Ishmael, Missouri =

Extinct town in the American state of Missouri

Coordinates: 37°48′22″N 91°03′24″W

Ishmael is an extinct town in Washington County, in the U.S. state of Missouri. The GNIS classifies it as a populated place.

A post office called Ishmael was established in 1929, and remained in operation until 1953. The name "Ishmael" was assigned by postal authorities, according to local history.
