= Ismayil =

Ismayil is both a given name and a surname. Notable people with the name include:

- Ismayil Bayramov (1900–1945), Azerbaijani military officer
- Ismayil Daghistanli (1907–1980), Azerbaijani and Soviet actor
- Ismayil Hajiyev (born 1949), Azerbaijani-Canadian conductor
- Ismayil Ibrahimli (born 1998), Azerbaijani footballer
- Ismayil Jafarpour (1925 - 18 February 1977) Azerbaijani orientalist
- Ismayil Mammadov (born 1976), Azerbaijani footballer
- Ismayil Shykhly (1919–1995), Azerbaijani writer
- Ismayil Zulfugarli (born 2001), Azerbaijani footballer
- Javid Ismayil (born 1972), Azerbaijani economist
- Malak Ismayil (born 2004), Azerbaijani chess player
- Rufat Ismayil (born 1981), Azerbaijani fashion designer
- Shah Ismayil, a 16th century Shah of Persia
- Shah Ismayil (opera), an opera by Muslim Magomayev
- Shah Ismail (footballer)
- Shah Ismail Order, an Azerbaijani military award
- Shah Ismail Dehlvi, 19th century Islamic scholar
