= Ismail al-Salabi =

Islamist militant leader in Libya

Ismail Mohammed al-Salabi (Arabic: سماعيل محمد الصلابي) is a Libyan citizen and Islamist militant leader who has deep rooted ties to the Libyan Muslim Brotherhood. He was the commander of the rebel forces in Benghazi under the 17 February Brigade.

== Biography ==
Al-Salabi is 39 years old from the Barga suburb of Benghazi. He was arrested in 1997 by the Gaddafi administration for his participation in a Benghazi-based clandestine network that offered shelter for Islamist rebels, including ones that were linked to the al-Qaeda linked Libyan Islamic Fighting Group (LIFG). He was sentenced to 6 years in the Abu Salim prison, where he became an Islamist activist, and befriended the Belhadj brothers, one of whom was a jihadist that fought in Afghanistan and an LIFG commander before the 2011 civil war in Libya. Prior to his political involvement, Salabi was a businessman, but after the outbreak of the Libyan Civil War, he became characterized for his role as a military commander of the Islamist rebel groups.

Al-Salabi has strong familial links to the Muslim Brotherhood in Libya. His father, Mohammed al-Salabi was a founding member of the Muslim Brotherhood in Libya during the 1960s. Salabi's brother, Ali al-Salabi, is regarded as one of the most prominent leaders and thinkers in the Libyan Muslim Brotherhood, as well as the overall Islamist movement in Libya.

== Beliefs ==
In the early on sought of the Libyan Civil War, Salabi took a stand against emerging secular groups, whom he said were giving Islamists a bad reputation that was creating political divisions that were benefiting Muammar Gaddafi. However, both he and his brother have expressed their belief that Islamic sharia law requires a democratic, constitutional government. Additionally, In the aftermath of the revolution and war, Salabi advocated for the unfreezing of Gaddafi's assets to be given to Libya and used for the Libyan people for things such as education, medical aid, and security.

== Leadership of Libyan rebels ==
Ismail al-Salabi is most known for his role as the military commander of the Libyan Islamist fighters, known as the February 17 brigade.[xii] Under his leadership, they defended Benghazi against Muammar Gaddafi's forces, and are often credited with leading a successful final defense attempt of Benghazi, where the uprising began. He originally commanded over 3,000 Islamist fighters, and reports up to the Interior Ministry of the National Transitional Council (NTC) in Tripoli.

He also went on to form an independent command brigade, called the Martyr Rafallah Sahati Brigade during the anti-Qaddafi revolution. This brigade was responsible for the death of Abdel Fatah Yunis, a former general under Gaddafi who led the rebels’ army. His rebel group was known to be receiving significant Qatari aid, giving them an increase of power during the conflict. The NTC complained that Qatari support favored the Islamists, which may account for the rift between Salabi and the NTC.[xviii] His brother was the main distributor of Qatar's aid and military to the Libyan rebels, notably including his brother.

Currently, Ismail al-Salabi is associated with the Benghazi Defense Companies (BDC), a group established to track down criminal followers of the former regime. These groups have been fighting against the polarizing figure, Khalifa Hifter, who controls much of eastern Libya. The group's only source of reference for funding and fighting comes from a religious authority that's headed by Sheikh Saidq al-Ghariani, who frequently expresses support for Islamist and jihadist factions in Libya. There is also increasing evidence of affiliations between BDC and al-Qaeda affiliates and coalitions. In his role as one of the most prominent Libyan Islamist militia leaders, he has grown to lead the Benghazi Revolutionaries’ Shura Council coalition, which is made up of the most prominent militant Salafist organizations in Libya including Ansar al-Sharia, the Libyan al-Qaeda affiliate, the February 17 Brigade, and the Rafallah al-Sahati Brigade, exposing close ties with terrorism.

He is accused by the Egyptian government of working with Qatar and Turkey to facilitate the movement of Libyan jihadists to join al-Qaeda and Muslim Brotherhood-aligned rebel groups in Syria, as well as organizing an armed opposition army called the Free Egyptian Army to overthrow the al-Sisi government in Egypt.
