= List of storms named Ismael =

The name Ismael was used for three tropical cyclones in the Eastern Pacific Ocean:

- Hurricane Ismael (1983), Category 2 hurricane, its remnants caused heavy flooding in parts of California and Nevada
- Hurricane Ismael (1989), Category 3 hurricane that brought heavy rain to Acapulco
- Hurricane Ismael (1995), Category 1 hurricane that caused over 100 fatalities in Mexico and $26 million in damage

The name Ismael was retired after the 1995 season and replaced with Israel, another Spanish name beginning with the letter "I" for use in the 2001 season. However, after leaders of the Anti-Defamation League and the Zionist Organization of America made public remarks in the spring of 2001 sharply criticizing usage of the name, hundreds of people sent e-mails or called the National Hurricane Center (NHC) to express their opposition to its use. In response, NHC director Max Mayfield urged the WMO to choose a different name. The name Israel was replaced with Ivo during the season instead.
