= İsmail Şahmalı =

Turkish footballer

Personal information
- Date of birth: 4 January 1982 (age 44)
- Place of birth: Adana, Turkey
- Height: 1.83 m (6 ft 0 in)
- Position: Goalkeeper

Team information
- Current team: Çorum FK

Senior career*
Years	Team	Apps	(Gls)
2004–2007	Sidespor	48	(0)
2008–2009	Denizli Belediyespor	35	(0)
2009–2016	Denizlispor	88	(0)
2010–2011	→ Tarsus İdman Yurdu (loan)	19	(0)
2013–2014	→ Ankaraspor (loan)	35	(0)
2016–2017	Manisaspor	28	(0)
2017–2018	Adana Demirspor	21	(0)
2018–2019	Kızılcabölükspor	13	(0)
2019–2020	Kastamonuspor 1966	28	(0)
2020	Osmaniyespor FK	0	(0)
- * Club domestic league appearances and goals

Ismail Sahmali (born 4 January 1982) is a Turkish former professional footballer.
