= Prophet Ishmael =

Ishmael Chokurongerwa, referred to by himself and his followers as Prophet Ishmael, is a Zimbabwean religious leader and self-proclaimed apostolic prophet who is accused of child exploitation.

In 2024, Zimbabwean police raided a compound near Harare where Ishmael lived with around 1,000 followers, and discovered a total of 251 children, most of whom did not have birth certificates and who were being made to perform manual labor instead of attending school. There were 16 unregistered graves at the compound as well, seven of which belonged to infants. Ishmael and seven other followers were charged with crimes against children.

Some of Ishmael's followers have refused to abandon their beliefs. One woman said "We will never leave our religion. We are like an elephant, nothing can stop us. All those people fighting us are merchants of Satan."

The Prophet Ishmael sect shares features in common with other apostolic (also called Vapostori) churches, which have a large following in Southern Africa.

Ishmael was previously jailed in 2015 for leading an attack on police officers.
