= Ismael del Toro =

Mexican politician

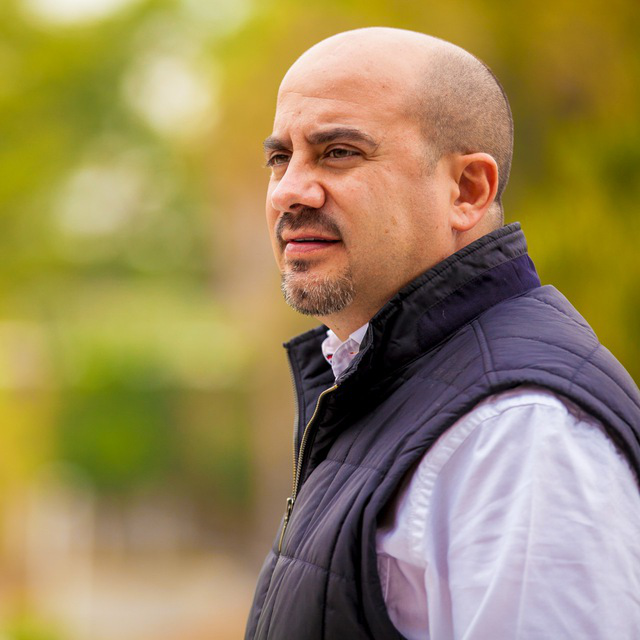
- Born: December 1, 1975 (age 49); Guadalajara, Mexico
- Known for: former mayor of Guadalajara

Ismael del Toro Castro (Guadalajara, Jalisco, Mexico; December 1, 1975) is a lawyer and Mexican politician, affiliated with the Citizens' Movement party. He served as the municipal president of Guadalajara, Jalisco from October 1, 2018, to February 28, 2021.

== Biography ==
He was born in Guadalajara, Jalisco on December 1, 1975, as the youngest of seven siblings. He studied at Technical High School 4 and Preparatory School 5 of the University of Guadalajara, later obtaining his degree in law from the University Center for Social Sciences and Humanities (CUCSH) of the University of Guadalajara. He is married to Patricia Lozano; the couple has two daughters: Andrea and Ivanna del Toro Lozano.

== Political career ==
He served as the General Secretary of the Municipality of Tlajomulco de Zúñiga from 2010 to 2012, when he resigned from his position to run for municipal president of the same municipality and was elected. He took office as the municipal president of Tlajomulco de Zúñiga on October 1, 2012, and remained in the position until February 28, 2015, when he ran to be a local deputy for the local district 7 with its headquarters in Tlajomulco de Zúñiga and was elected.
