= Ismael Peraza Valdez =

Mexican politician

- Born: 17 June 1967 (age 58); Campeche, Mexico
- Occupation: Politician
- Political party: PRI

Ismael Peraza Valdez (born 17 June 1967) is a Mexican politician from the Institutional Revolutionary Party. In 2009 he served as Deputy of the LX Legislature of the Mexican Congress representing Campeche.
