= Esmail Rangraz =

Iranian serial killer (1975–2017)

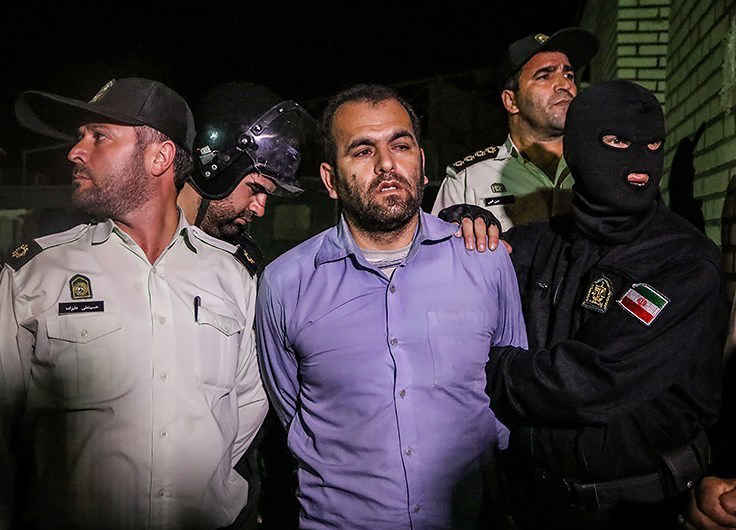
- Esmail Jafarzadeh (center), minutes before execution
- Born: Esmail Jafarzadeh; 1975; Imperial State of Iran
- Died: September 19, 2017 (aged 41–42); Parsabad, Ardabil, Iran
- Cause of death: Execution by hanging
- Conviction: Murder
- Penalty: Death

Details
- Victims: 3
- Span of crimes: 2012–2017
- Country: Iran

Esmail Jafarzadeh (Persian: اسماعیل جعفرزاده; 1975 – September 19, 2017), known professionally as Esmail Rangraz (Persian: اسماعیل رنگرز), was an Iranian serial killer.

== Background ==
Approximately 15 years prior to his arrest, Esmail was once arrested for armed conflict. He brought a little girl to his father's house, but the girl cried out and ran away from him. Subsequently, the father of the girl came to his house and began to fight him, and because of this incident, a police report was written. The girl's family refused to move forward with charges, however. After this incident, Esmail's first wife decided to separate from him.

== Previous murders ==
Esmail confessed to three murders. In 2012, a woman went missing, and he was arrested on suspicion of kidnapping and spent two weeks in custody, but since no reason for the murder could be obtained, he was freed; however, Esmail confessed to killing the woman after his final arrest.

In 2014, a corpse was discovered whose killer was not found. After the murder of Atena and subsequent investigation, Esmail's car was inspected, with him confessing to the murder.

== Murder of Atena Aslani ==
Atena Aslani was a 7-year-old Iranian girl from Parsabad who was killed by Esmail Jafarzadeh on June 28, 2017. The Attorney General of Parsabad said: "Atena went away from her father's dyeing shop to a nearby shop. The shopkeeper was a 42-year-old man who had known Atena and her father for a long time." Also, according to the Ardabil prosecutor, his motive was sexual harassment.

Esmail Jafarzadeh said in his confession: "For two or three days I was tempted to see Atena. On the day of the incident I came to my shop to take water and because nobody was there, I went to her. I wanted her to help me out, but she began to shout. So I put my hand on her mouth, and when I came to my senses she did not breathe anymore. I was scared and took the body to the parking lot, where I hid it in a barrel. I fled to my room, but a few days later I was arrested as a suspect and my secret was revealed."

== Arrest and disclosure of murders ==
By examining CCTV footage it was determined that Atena's killer disappeared in the range of the shops, but the moment of his arrival was not registered on any camera. At that time, Esmail was arrested as a suspect and sent to prison for interrogation. His house was inspected, but the police were not aware of the body hidden in the parking lot. According to the killer's brother, Jafarzadeh called his wife while he was in prison and asked her to go to the parking lot and find the barrel. Jafarzadeh's wife, after finding the barrel in which the corpse was, disclosed this information to the police.

== Execution ==
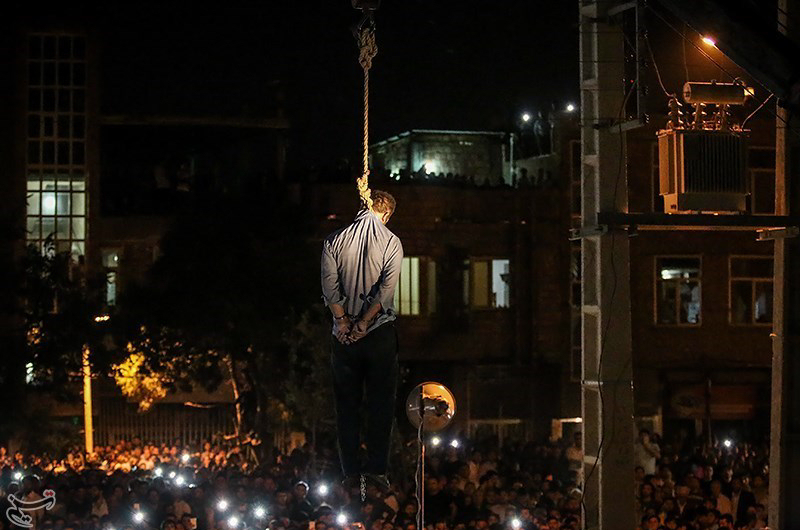
Execution of Esmail Jafarzadeh on September 19, 2017, in Parsabad.

Jafarzadeh was publicly hanged on September 19, 2017, in Parsabad.

== See also ==
- Mohammed Bijeh
- Saeed Hanaei
- List of serial killers by country
