= Ismaël Karba Bangoura =

Guinean footballer (born 1994)

Ismaël Bangoura
Personal information
- Full name: Ismaël Karba Bangoura
- Date of birth: 8 November 1994 (age 32)
- Place of birth: Port Kamsar, Guinea
- Height: 1.75 m (5 ft 9 in)
- Position: Left back

Youth career
- Inter Milan
- 2013: Cesena

Senior career*
Years	Team	Apps	(Gls)
2013–2016	Cesena	3	(0)
2014–2015	→ San Marino (loan)	10	(0)
2015–2016	→ Andria (loan)	15	(1)
2016–2017	Maceratese	10	(0)
2018	Mosta	3	(0)
2020	Virtus	5	(0)
- * Club domestic league appearances and goals as of 20:50, 4 August 2020 (UTC)

Ismaël Karba Bangoura (born 8 November 1994) is a Guinean footballer playing as a left defender.

== Career ==
Born in Port Kamsar, Bangoura started his career at Italian side Inter Milan, playing for the club's youth side; in January 2013 he joined Cesena alongside Yago Del Piero, in a definitive deal and a temporary deal respectively.

On 18 May 2013 Bangoura made his professional debut, coming on as a second-half substitute in a 1–1 home draw against Pro Vercelli.

On 7 July 2014 he left for San Marino Calcio.

On 16 July 2015 he was signed by the Lega Pro side Andria for a 1-year temporary deal.

On 9 August 2016 he was signed by Maceratese.
