= Ismael Al-Harbi =

Emirati association football player (born 1998)

Ismael Al-Harbi إسماعيل الحربي
Personal information
- Full name: Ismael Ibrahim Abdullah Al-Harbi
- Date of birth: 14 November 1998 (age 27)
- Place of birth: Emirates
- Height: 1.59 m (5 ft 3 in)
- Position: Right back

Youth career
- –2019: Al-Wahda

Senior career*
Years	Team	Apps	(Gls)
2019–2020	Al-Wahda	1	(0)
2022	Al-Arabi	0	(0)
2024–2025	Majd		
- * Club domestic league appearances and goals

Ismael Al-Harbi (Arabic:إسماعيل الحربي) (born 14 November 1998) is an Emirati footballer who plays as a right back.

== Career ==
=== Al-Wahda ===
Al-Harbi started his career at Al-Wahda and is a product of the Al-Wahda's youth system. On 1 January 2020, Al-Harbi made his professional debut for Al-Wahda against Al-Sharjah in the Pro League, replacing Mansoor Al-Harbi .
