= Nola Ishmael =

Barbadian nurse (born 1943)

Nola Ishmael OBE (born 1943) is a Barbadian nurse who became the first black or minority ethnic director of nursing in London.

She was appointed OBE in the 2000 birthday honours list.

A portrait of Ishmael, a 2006 photograph by Julia Fullerton-Batten, is held in the National Portrait Gallery.
