= Ismael Al-Jasmi =

Emirati footballer (born 1989)

Ismael Al-Maeeni
Personal information
- Full name: Ismael Mohammed Al-Maeeni
- Date of birth: 25 January 1989 (age 37)
- Place of birth: United Arab Emirates
- Height: 1.82 m (5 ft 11 1/2 in)
- Position: Defender

Youth career
- Al-Nasr

Senior career*
Years	Team	Apps	(Gls)
2010–2012	Al-Nasr		
2012–2014	Ajman		
2014–2016	Al-Jazira		
2015	→Al Wasl (loan)		
2016–2017	Al-Shaab		
2018–2019	Hatta		
- * Club domestic league appearances and goals

Ismael Al-Maeeni (Arabic:إسماعيل المعيني) (born 25 January 1989) is an Emirati footballer. . He is one of the strongest defenders in UAE who played in famous clubs in UAE.
