= Ismail Lghazaoui =

Moroccan activist and engineer (born c. 1990)

- إسماعيل الغزاوي
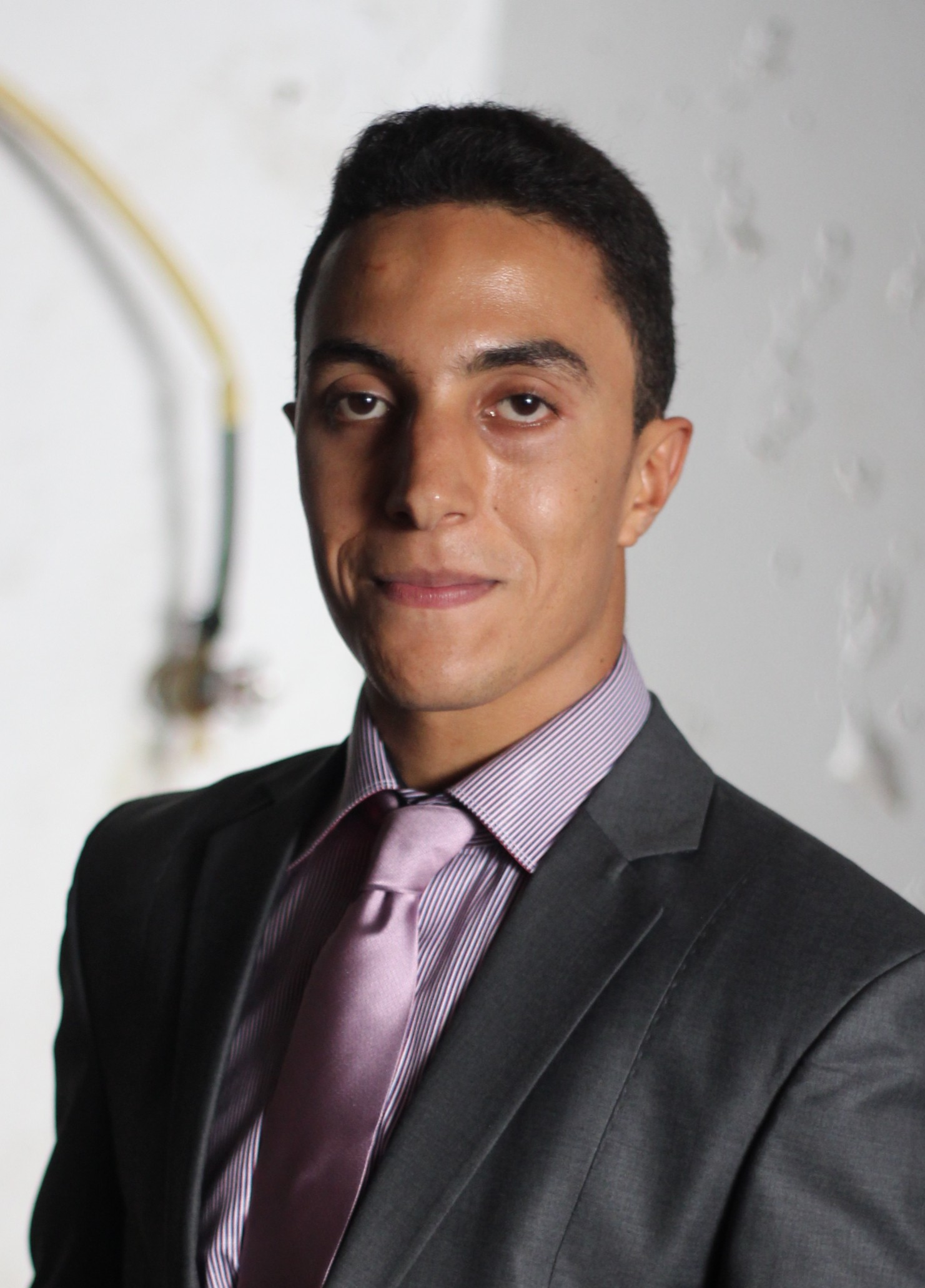
- Born: October 20, 1990 (age 35); Casablanca
- Citizenship: Morocco
- Occupations: Human rights activist Agricultural engineer
- Years active: 2023–present

Ismail Lghazaoui (Arabic: إسماعيل الغزاوي, romanized: Ismāʻīl al-Ghazāwī; born October 20, 1990) is a Moroccan human rights activist and agricultural engineer who became known in Morocco for his public support of Palestine during the Gaza genocide. As a result of his activism, in 2024 Lghazaoui was sentenced to one year in prison for "inciting to commit felonies and misdemeanours by electronic means" in a trial that was criticised by national and international human rights organisations.

== Activism ==
A full-time agricultural engineer, following the outbreak of the Israel-Hamas War in 2023, Lghazaoui became a prominent figure of the Boycott, Divestment and Sanctions movement in Morocco. He criticised the Moroccan government's normalisation of diplomatic relations with Israel, which had resumed in 2020. As part of his activism within BDS, Lghazaoui took part in campaigns against French retailer Carrefour, which operated branches in Morocco, and the Danish business Maersk, whose ships often stopped at Moroccan ports, for their perceived support of the Israeli government. Lghazaoui also organised protests outside of embassies and consulates using the hashtag "siege of embassies" (حصار_السفارات, Ḥiṣār Alsfārāt).

== Arrest, trial and imprisonment ==
On 25 October 2024, Lghazaoui was arrested by the Moroccan police while travelling to a demonstration outside the United States consulate in Casablanca. He was reportedly assaulted by officers from the National Judicial Police's specialist squad for political cases and briefly detained, where his personal details were recorded before he was released. The arrest occurred shorlty after Lghazaoui had led a protest at Tangier port in protest of two Maersk cargo ships stopping there which were believed to be transporting military equipment to Israel, as part of BDS' "Mask Off Maersk" campaign. BDS Morocco and The New Arab reported that the protest had led to several port workers refusing to unload the ships. The Moroccan newspaper Sawt al-Maghrib alleged that the arrest had been triggered by a 56-second video clip shared over WhatsApp which showed Lghazaoui calling for a demonstration to occur in front of the US consulate in Casablanca in support of Palestine.

On 19 November 2024, Lghazaoui was summoned to appear before the National Judicial Police, where he was detained for 48 hours and interrogated. On 21 November, he appeared before the King's Prosecutor at Aïn Sebaâ Court of First Instance in Casablanca, where he was charged with inciting one or more persons to commit a felony or misdemeanour if the incitement has no subsequent effect" under article 1-299 of the Moroccan criminal code. Lghazaoui's request for bail was dismissed. A further hearing was held on 26 November, where a second request for bail was also rejected. During that hearing, a protest was held outside the court by the Moroccan Association for the Support of Political Prisoners which included members of Lghazaoui's family. A further court hearing was delayed until December 2024 to give Lghazaoui's defence team time to prepare their case.

Lghazaoui's lawyers argued that there was an absence of direct evidence of his alleged offence, and criticised the prosecution's report as being "very weak and short" and that it did not specify what the exact felony or misdemeanour Lghazaoui had allegedly incited was. The prosecution called for the rejection of the defence's case. On 10 December 2024, Lghazaoui was found guilty and sentenced to one year in prison in addition to a 5000 dirhams fine.

The appeal against this conviction was scheduled to be heard in the Court of Appeal in Casablanca. The first session of the appeal proceedings was held on January 22, 2025, but the case was adjourned to January 29, 2025. On 5 February, Lghazaoui's sentence was reduced to four months, with two months suspended, and he was subsequently released from prison.

== Response ==
Lghazaoui's sentence was criticised by human rights organisations both in Morocco and internationally. BDS Morocco stated the sentence infringed upon Lghazaoui's human right to express solidarity with the Palestinian people, in addition to his rights to freedom of speech, assembly, and peaceful protest. It described Lghazaoui's sentence as arbitrary detention due to the prosecution not providing evidence of Lghazaoui's crimes. The Moroccan Association for Human Rights demanded Lghazaoui's immediate release. The Moroccan Association for the Support of Political Prisoners denounced the sentence, calling it "new act of repression against freedom of expression guaranteed by the Moroccan constitution". Moroccan human rights activist Khadija Ryadi described Lghazaoui as a political prisoner.

Internationally, the global BDS movement called Lghazaoui's arrest a "serious assault" on human rights and a violation of the Moroccan constitution and the Moroccan government's obligations under international law. Front Line Defenders described Lghazaoui's detention as a "clear act of reprisal" by Moroccan authorities in response to Lghazaoui's peaceful activism. The Palestinian Youth Movement described the sentence as an attempt to "silence" Lghazaoui's "courageous voice" in support of the Palestinian people.
