= Isma'il Mexsut =

Chinese politician (1932–2017)

- ئىسمائىل مەخسۇت

Mayor of Ürümqi
- In office 1983–1987
- Party Secretary: Liu Sicong
- Preceded by: Ubrihari Isma'il
- Succeeded by: Yüsup Eysa

Personal details
- Born: April 1932 Shufu County, Xinjiang, Republic of China
- Died: August 14, 2017 (aged 85) Ürümqi, Xinjiang, People's Republic of China
- Party: Chinese Communist Party

Chinese name
- Simplified Chinese: 司马义·买合苏提
- Traditional Chinese: 司馬義·買合蘇提
Transcriptions
Standard Mandarin
- Hanyu Pinyin: Sīmǎyì Mǎihésūtí

Isma'il Mexsut (Uyghur: ئىسمائىل مەخسۇت, romanized: Isma'il Mexsut; April 1932 – 14 August 2017) was a Chinese politician of Uyghur origin who served as mayor of Ürümqi, the capital of Xinjiang, from 1983 to 1987. He was a member of the 8th and 9th National Committee of the Chinese People's Political Consultative Conference.

== Biography ==
Isma'il Mexsut was born in Shufu County, Xinjiang, in April 1932, during the Republic of China.

He entered the workforce in February 1950, and joined the Chinese Communist Party (CCP) in August 1953. He was principal of the High School of Yecheng County in 1950 before getting involved in politics in Kashgar Prefecture in 1958. In 1973, he was assigned to Ürümqi, the capital of Xinjiang, and appointed deputy director and CCP Deputy Committee Secretary of the Culture and Education Office and CCP Committee Secretary of the Education Bureau. In 1979, he took office as deputy head of the Organization Department of the Xinjiang Uygur Autonomous Regional Committee of the Chinese Communist Party, a position he held until 1983, when he was promoted to mayor of Ürümqi. In 1987, he was transferred to Xinjiang Production and Construction Corps and appointed deputy political commissar.

On 14 August 2017, Isma'il Mexsut died from an illness in Ürümqi, aged 85.

Government offices
Preceded by Ubrihari Isma'il (吾布里海日·司马义)	Mayor of Ürümqi; 1983–1987	Succeeded by Yüsup Eysa
