= Ismail Tkhagush =

- Тхьагъушъ Хьэлалэ ыкъо Исмел (Adyghe); Исмаил Халалович Тхагушев (Russian)
- Born: 17 March 1920; Maloye Pseushko, Kuban Oblast, Russian SFSR (now Tuapsinsky District, Krasnodar Krai, Russia)
- Died: 15 November 1943 (aged 23); Zhytomyr Raion, Zhytomyr Oblast, Ukrainian SSR, Soviet Union
- Military career
- Allegiance: Soviet Union
- Branch: Red Army
- Service years: 1940–1943
- Rank: Lieutenant
- Units: 89th Rifle Regiment, 23rd Rifle Division
- Conflicts: World War II
- Awards: Hero of the Soviet Union Order of Lenin

Ismail Tkhagush (Adyghe: Тхьагъушъ Хьэлалэ ыкъо Исмел, Russian: Исмаил Халалович Тхагушев; 17 March 1920 – 15 November 1943) was a Soviet Circassian soldier and a Hero of the Soviet Union. Tkhagush was the first Soviet soldier to cross the Dnieper.

== Biography ==
Ismail Tkhagush was born on 17 March 1920, in the aul of Maloye Pseushko in the Kuban Oblast (now in the Tuapsinsky District of Krasnodar Krai) to a peasant family. He was of Circassian ethnicity. He completed eight years of schooling, followed by bookkeeping courses, and graduated from a pedagogical technical school in 1939. He subsequently worked as a bookkeeper on a kolkhoz. Tkhagush joined the Red Army in October 1940 and served on the front lines of World War II from 3 January 1942. In July 1942, he completed junior lieutenant courses in the North Caucasus Military District. Throughout the war, he served as a soldier, a mortar platoon commander, and a rifle company commander across the Southwestern, Southern, North Caucasian, Voronezh, and 1st Ukrainian Fronts.

On 25 September 1943, Lieutenant Tkhagush was the first in his regiment to cross the Dnieper near the village of Studenets in the Kaniv Raion of the Cherkasy Oblast. His company seized a strategic height and held it, ensuring the successful crossing of other units of the regiment. On 2 October 1943, the company repelled several fierce enemy counterattacks, inflicting significant losses on enemy manpower and equipment. For his actions, he was awarded the title of Hero of the Soviet Union on 25 October 1943:

On September 25th, 1943, comrade Tkhagushev and his company were the first to ford the Dnieper and, fulfilling the order of his commanders, attacked height 175.9 despite the enemy having a 3-4 fold numerical advantage, occupied it, and fortified on the western slope, which enabled other Army units to cross the river.

On October 2nd, 1943, when German infantry counterattacked with support from tanks and aircraft to retake height 175.9, brave warrior Tkhagushev, a true Red Army officer, skillfully organized a deflection of the counterattacks, not letting the enemy's infantry move forward one step.

Leaving behind dozens of dead soldiers and officers, the enemy retreated. Comrade Tkhagushev's infantry company killed two companies worth of enemy soldiers and officers. He is dedicated to the cause of Lenin-Stalin and the Socialist Motherland.

Conclusions: for demonstration of courage and heroism in battle with German invaders, comrade Tkhagushev is worthy of the title of Hero of the Soviet Union

Tkhagush was killed in action on 15 November 1943, near Zhytomyr. He is buried in the village of Leshchyn in the Zhytomyr Raion of Ukraine.

== Awards ==
- Hero of the Soviet Union (awarded 25 October 1943)
- Order of Lenin
- Order of the Red Star

== Memorials ==
- His name is engraved in gold in the Hall of Fame at the Central Museum of the Great Patriotic War in Victory Park, Moscow.
- A memorial monument stands at his grave in Leshchyn.
- A memorial plaque was installed in his native village of Maloye Pseushko, where a street is also named in his honor.
- School No. 12 in the village of Georgiyevskoye is named after him and features a commemorative plaque on its building.

== See also ==
- List of Heroes of the Soviet Union
