= İsmail Çağlar Bayırcı =

Turkish politician (born 1984)

Member of the Grand National Assembly of Turkey
- Incumbent
- Assumed office 14 May 2023
- Constituency: Kütahya

Personal details
- Born: 1984 (age 40–41)
- Political party: Justice and Development Party

İsmail Çağlar Bayırcı (born 1984) is a Turkish politician from the Justice and Development Party who was elected to the Grand National Assembly of Turkey from Kütahya in the 2023 Turkish parliamentary election.
