= İsmail Dümbüllü =

Turkish comedy actor

İsmail Hakkı Dümbüllü
- Born: İsmail Hakkı; 1897; Istanbul, Ottoman Empire
- Died: 5 November 1973 (aged 75–76); Istanbul, Turkey
- Resting place: Karacaahmet Cemetery, Istanbul
- Occupation: Actor
- Known for: The last representative of ortaoyunu (middle show) tradition in traditional Turkish theatre.

İsmail Hakkı Dümbüllü (1897, İstanbul – 5 November 1973, Istanbul), Turkish comedy actor.

He is the last representative of ortaoyunu (middle show) tradition in traditional Turkish theatre. and a major comedy actor in Turkish cinema.

== Biography ==
He was born in 1897 in Üsküdar Süleymanağa neighborhood of Istanbul. He is the son of Zeynel Abidin Efendi, one of Abdülhamid II's musketeers, and Fatma Azize Hanım.

Dümbüllü İsmail worked with Bald Hasan Efendi, a master actor of comedy in the Turkish theatre, between 1917 and 1926 and learned the art of tulûat (traditional improvisational theater) from him. No other actor who performs tulûat in master-apprentice relationship has been seen after Dümbüllü İsmail. He received the nickname of "Dümbüllü" by singing a canto titled "Dümbüllü".

In 1928, İsmail Hakkı Dümbüllü founded his own troupe with Tevfik İnce in Istanbul, and he began touring Anatolia in 1922. The artist, who also performed in operettas such as "Ayşem", "Cebe Gitti" and "Bülbül", became the most famous name in traditional theater after the death of Naşit Özcan and continued the tradition of the middle play on his own.

He started acting in movies in 1947. He became a star in cinema as a 'folk comedian'; and was mostly identified with the Nasreddin Hodja character in the films he played. He was the lead actor in a series of comedies: Dümbüllü Macera Peşinde (Dümbüllü in Search of Adventure, Şadan Kamil, 1948), Dümbüllü Sporcu (Dümbüllü the Sportsman, Seyf Havaeri, 1952), and Dümbüllü Tarzan (Dümbüllü Tarzan, Muharrem Gürses, 1954). Before start making films, he played orta oyunu (middle show) and tulûat at TRT Istanbul Radio. His efforts in transferring orta oyunu plays to radio and cinema was effective in making the art of traditional Turkish theater known by more people and ensuring the continuity of the orta oyunu tradition.

Dümbüllü took over his teacher Bald Hasan Efendi's turban (kavuk), representing the orta oyunu (middle show) and his fez, representing art of tuluat, and handed these two symbols to Münir Özkul in 1968. These two symbols continue to be passed on in a traditional ceremony among Turkish theater actors.

He died at November 5, 1973 after a traffic accident.
