= Ismael (footballer, born 1948) =

Brazilian footballer (1948–2010)

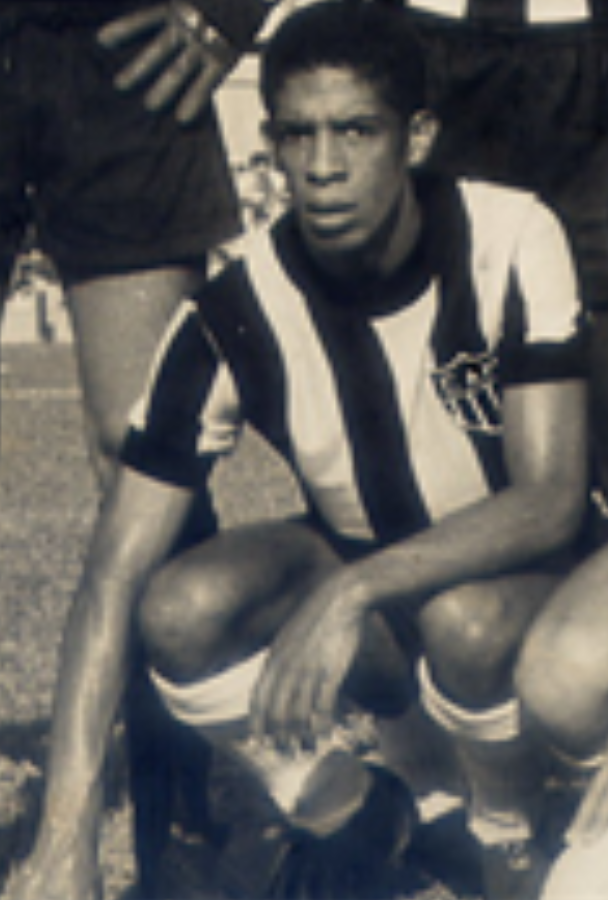
- Ismael in 1971

Personal information
- Full name: Ismael do Amaral Filho
- Date of birth: 20 December 1948
- Place of birth: Belo Horizonte, Minas Gerais, Brazil
- Date of death: 5 February 2010 (aged 61)
- Place of death: Belo Horizonte, Minas Gerais, Brazil
- Position: Right winger

Senior career*
Years	Team	Apps	(Gls)
1970–1972	Atlético Mineiro		
1972	→ Nacional (loan)		
1973	Atlético Mineiro		
1973–1975	Comercial–MS		
- * Club domestic league appearances and goals

Ismael do Amaral Filho (20 December 1948 – 20 December 2010), more commonly known as Ismael was a Brazilian footballer. He was known for playing as a substitute midfielder for Atlético Mineiro throughout the early 1970s.

== Career ==
Ismael began his career with Atlético Mineiro with his debut being in a friendly against Curvelo on 7 September 1970. During his tenure with the club, he would be a part of the winning squads for the 1971 and 1972 editions of the Taça Belo Horizonte as well as the 1971 Campeonato Brasileiro Série A as he would play only one game in the tournament. He was then loaned out to Nacional for the remainder of the 1972 season as a part of substitute players gaining more experience to return for the 1973 season. He would then return to the club for the 1973 season where it would ultimately be his final season with the club as he would play his last match on 1 May 1973 in a friendly against Usipa as he would play in 51 matches and score 11 goals. For the remainder of the year, he would play for Comercial–MS until 1975.
