= Ismail Gangji =

Ismaili Pir, religious leader, Ismaili missionary and social worker from Junagadh

Pir Wazir Ismail Gangji / Varas Ismail Gangji (1788-1883) was an Ismaili Pir, religious leader, Ismaili missionary and social worker from Junagadh, who is also noted for beautiful explanations of some often recited Ginans of Ismaili faith.

His father Gangji, was a Hindu, who had become follower of Ismaili faith during his lifetime and worked as an employee of jamdarkhana department of Junagadh State, where later Ismail Gangji was also employed. Once the wife of the Nawab lost her precious necklace, Ismail Gangji found it and returned to the Nawab. Due to his honesty, he was promoted to a very elevated post in Revenue department and afterwards, he became the head of the departments of the Treasury and Mint in 1821. The Nawab also gave him a piece of land in appreciation of his 50 years services in 1869. He was granted a land in the village of Anandpur, where he built quarters for the destitute.

He was an enlightened soul and Hasan Ali Shah, the Aga Khan I had bestowed upon him title of Wazir of Kathiawar, elevating him from his post of Varas at a community meeting. Later, Varas Ismail Gangji was declared Pir after his death by the Aga Ali Shah, when he visited his grave at Junagadh in 1883. During his lifetime, he tried his best to improve the worst conditions of the Ismailis and worked hard to impart knowledge of Ismaili faith, especially in the Khoja community and served as a missionary converting thousands to his faith. Imam Sultan Muhammad Shah, the Aga Khan III is also reported to have said that, "Ismail Gangji converted sixty thousand believers, and taken ten thousand with him." He was known as the Lion of Kathiawar in Ismaili community of Gujarat.

Among his notable disciples and converts were Mukhi Virji Kamadia, who shared a close relationship with Wazir Ismail Gangji. Mukhji Virji's son Jamal Meghji was a brilliant orator who became a missionary, and Wazir Ismail Gangji was so impressed with his oratory that he had blessed Jamal Meghji that "Your status will be very high". Jamal Meghji's son Ashad Ali Haji (1885-1958), is also counted among Ismaili heroes.

Ismail died in 1883 after a brief illness and was survived by his sons Kassim and Itmadi Ibrahim both of whom served Junagadh State and were appointed to the post which became vacant upon death of Wazir Ismail Gangji and also served spreading Ismaili faith in Gujarat.
