= Esmail Babolian =

Iranian numerical analyst

- Born: 1946 (age 79–80); Isfahan, Iran
- Education: Kharazmi University
- Known for: Numerical analysis
- Scientific career
- Workplaces: Kharazmi University

Esmail Babolian is an Iranian numerical analyst, best known as the pioneer professor of numerical analysis in Iran. He has published over 60 international papers in different areas of numerical analysis. Recently he and Mohebalizadeh have developed a fast numerical method for solving differential equations with high accuracy. Babolian is member of the Institute for Research in Fundamental Sciences.

== Education ==
Ph.D. University of Liverpool 1980, dissertation: Galerkin Method for Integral and Integro-Differential Equations, Mathematics Subject Classification: 65—Numerical analysis.
