= İsmail Müştak Mayakon =

Turkish politician

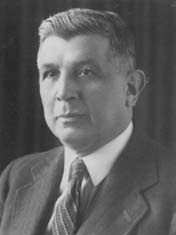

Member of the Grand National Assembly

Personal details
- Born: 1882 Thessaly, Ottoman Empire
- Died: 1938 (aged 55–56) Paris, France

İsmail Müştak Mayakon (1882–1938) was a Turkish writer, member of parliament, nationalist politician and eugenist.
