= Ismail Mudashir =

Nigerian journalist

- Born: 12 November 1980 (age 45); Zamfara State
- Education: Federal Polytechnic Offa, Kwara State, Kaduna Polytechnic, Bayero University, Kano and Jamia Millia Islamia University, New Delhi, India.
- Occupations: Journalist and SA Media and Publicity to the Deputy President of the Senate

Ismail Mudashir (born 12 November 1980) is a Nigerian journalist and the current Special Adviser on Media and Publicity to the Deputy President of the Senate, Senator Barau Jibrin CON.

== Early life and education ==
Mudashir was born in Zamfara State on November 12, 1980, and hails from Offa, Kwara State. He studied Mass Communication at the Federal Polytechnic, Offa, Kwara State; Kaduna Polytechnic, Bayero University Kano; and Jamia Millia Islamia University, New Delhi, India, for his undergraduate and postgraduate studies.

== Career ==
Mudashir started his journalism career in 2004 at New Nigerian Newspapers (NNN) in Kaduna. He moved to the Media Trust Group (MTG), the publisher of Daily Trust Newspapers, as a senior reporter in 2009. Remarkably, he was appointed the role of Kaduna Bureau Chief in 2012, achieving this milestone just three years into his tenure with MTG. During this period, he also reported on developments in Kebbi, Sokoto, and Zamfara states.

Mudashir served in several roles at Daily Trust, such as Deputy General Editor, Group Politics Editor, State House correspondent, and leader of the National Assembly team within the media group.

Prior to his parliamentary coverage, Mudashir also served as the Regional Editor (Kano) from 2013 to 2015, where he led the company's team in Kano, Katsina, and Jigawa states. In his various roles, he demonstrated his versatility and leadership within the media group.

On 23 July 2023, the Deputy President of the Nigerian Senate, Senator Barau Jibrin appointed Mudashir as his SA Media and Publicity.
