= Ismael Diaz =

Ismael Diaz may refer to:

- Ismael Díaz (footballer, born 1990), Dominican footballer
- Ismael Díaz (footballer, born 1997), Panamanian footballer
- Ismael Díaz (Salvadoran footballer) (died 1976), Salvadoran footballer
- Ismael Díaz (football manager) (born 1965), Spanish football manager
