= Ismail Kamoka =

Libyan diplomat (born 1966)

Ismail Kamoka (born 1966) is a diplomat of the Libyan Embassy in the United Kingdom who was jailed in 2007 for three years and nine months after admitting funding the Libyan Islamic Fighting Group (LIFG) and providing false passports. He moved to the U.K. in 1994, where he claimed political asylum and now lives in London.
