= Esmail Zanjani =

Esmail D. Zanjani is a professor and medical researcher at the University of Nevada, Reno.

His research involves growing human cells within sheep embryos. In March 2007, it was announced that Zanjani had created a human-sheep chimera. Zanjani has stated that his work involves sheep because of the blood-forming systems of sheep and humans are similar.

He has served as president of the International Society for Experimental Hematology.

== Education ==
- Ph.D., Experimental Hematology, New York University, 1969
- M.S., Biology, New York University, 1966
- B.S., Biology, New York University, 1964
