= Ismael Ordaz Jiménez =

Mexican politician

- Born: 16 February 1951 (age 75); Oaxaca, Mexico
- Occupation: Politician
- Political party: PRI

Ismael Ordaz Jiménez (born 16 February 1951) is a Mexican politician from the Institutional Revolutionary Party. From 2006 to 2009 he served as Deputy of the LX Legislature of the Mexican Congress representing Oaxaca.
