= Ismail Sahardiid =

Somali military official

Ismail Sahardiid اسماعيل سحرديد
- Military career
- Allegiance: Federal Government of Somalia
- Branch: Somali National Army
- Rank: General
- Commands: southern Juba region
- Conflicts: Battle of Kismayo (2012)

Ismail Sahardiid (Somali: Ismaaciil Saxardiid, Arabic: اسماعيل سحرديد) was a Somali military official. He was the overall commander of the TFG government forces in the southern Jubaland region, having led SNA forces during the Battle of Kismayo (2012). After further command changes, he replaced Brig Gen Sid Abdulle and took command again at the end of July 2016.
