= Ismail Liban =

Somali footballer

Ismail Haji
Personal information
- Full name: Ismail Liban Haji Mohamed
- Date of birth: 29 July 2001 (age 25)
- Place of birth: Perth (Australia)
- Height: 6 ft 3 in (1.91 m)
- Position: Midfielder

Team information
- Current team: Melbourne Knights
- Number: 20

Youth career
- Bayswater City

Senior career*
Years	Team	Apps	(Gls)
2020	Bayswater City	3	(0)
2021	Floreat Athena	2	(0)
2021–	Cockburn City	4	(0)

International career^{‡}
2021–	Somalia	1	(0)
- * Club domestic league appearances and goals ‡ National team caps and goals as of 17:47, 22 June 2021 (UTC)

Ismail Liban Haji Mohamed (Somali: Ismaaciil Liibaan; born 29 June 2001) is a Somali footballer who plays as a midfielder for Melbourne Knights in Victoria Premier League and the Somalia national team.

== Club career ==
In 2021, following short spells at Bayswater City and Floreat Athena, Liban signed for Cockburn City.

== International career ==
On 15 June 2021, Liban made his debut for Somalia, in a 1–0 friendly loss against Djibouti.
