= Ismail Keta =

Albanian kickboxer (born 1976)

Personal information
- Nickname: The Bull
- Nationality: Albania
- Born: Ismail (Jonny) Keta; December 1, 1976 (age 49) Bulqizë, Albania

Boxing career

Ismail Keta (born 1 December 1976 in Bulqizë) is an Albanian kickboxer who was a three time German champion in 1999 and 2000 in Federation WKA. In 2001 he was proclaimed world champion Under Thaibox ( WKA ). In November 19-11-2011 he won the title of Federation World Champion Iska . In 2012 he won World Champion title again. His last title came in December 7-12-2013 for federation IKBF.

== "The Bull" in Germany ==
In 1997, Ismail Keta "The Bull" moved to Würzburg where he started as an amateur boxer with moderate success. He joined trainer Victor Koehl, of Dragon Gym, where he received technical touches, especially in Mixed Martial ArtsTandhai and kickboxing. Later he worked with coach Detlef Thürnau (the President of the K-1 committee, MTBD (Muay Thai Federation Germany), Klaus Nonnenmacher (7-time world champion in kickboxing), and WKA (World Kickboxing Association) and Klaus Begala ( Grandmaster in Jiu-Jiutsu Freefight).

== Professional kickboxing record ==
His career spanned fourteen years. His record included:

- 1999 Bavarian champion in Thai boxing (super heavyweight MTBD, Thürnau)
- 2000 German Champion in kick-boxing (super heavyweight WKA, Nonnenmacher)
- 2001 Victorious battle against reigning World Champion in Free-Fight (Super-heavyweight)
- 2001 vice-world champion in Thai boxing (super heavyweight WKA)
- 2002 professional license
- 2003 K-1 fighter in the super-heavyweight
- 2011 ISKA kickboxing champion
- 2012 ISKA kickboxing champion
- 2013 IKBF World Champion Champion
