= Ismail Bawa =

Ghanaian politician (born 1947)

Hon. Ismail Bawa

Member of parliament for Ablekuma Central constituency
- In office 7 January 1993 – 7 January 1997
- President: Jerry John Rawlings
- Preceded by: Adotey Nelson-Cofie
- Succeeded by: Clement Samuel Crabbe

Personal details
- Born: 14 September 1947 (age 79)
- Party: National Democratic Congress
- Education: Winneba Sports College
- Occupation: Politician
- Profession: Football Coach

Ismail Bawa (born 14 September 1947) is a Ghanaian politician and a Football Coach. He served as a member of parliament for the Ablekuma Central constituency in the Greater Accra region of Ghana.

== Early life and education ==
Bawa was born on 14 September 1947. He attended Winneba Sports College where he obtained a Certificate in Football Coaching.

== Politics ==
Bawa was elected as a member of the First Parliament of the Fourth Republic of Ghana during the 1992 Ghanaian parliamentary election, on the ticket of the National Democratic Congress. He was preceded by Adotey Nelson-Cofie who was a member of Parliament of the 3rd Republic of Ghana. However, he lost the seat during the 1996 Ghanaian General election to Clement Samuel Crabbe of the New Patriotic Party.

Samuel Crabbe won the election with 30,158 votes which represents 32.30% of the share by defeating Ismail Bawa of the National Democratic Congress (NDC) who obtained 28,952 votes which represented 31.00% of the share; Cornelius Adablah an Independent who obtained 7,092 votes which represent 7.60% of the share; Ahmed Ramadan of the People's National Convention; who obtained 6,569 votes which represent 7.00% of the share; Ellis Quaye of the Convention People's Party who received 1,773 votes which represent 1.90% of the share and Victor Okuley Nortey of the New Patriotic Party who obtained no votes.

== Career ==
Ismail Bawa was a former member of the First Parliament of the Fourth Republic of Ghana, he served from 7 January 1993 to 6 January 1997, he is a Football Coach.

== Personal life ==
He is a Muslim.
