= Ismael Ortega =

Macau footballer (born 1988)

Personal information
- Full name: Ismael Rolon Ortega
- Date of birth: 13 December 1988 (age 37)
- Place of birth: Paraguay
- Height: 1.78 m (5 ft 10 in)
- Position: Right-back

Team information
- Current team: Monte Carlo

Senior career*
| Years | Team | Apps | (Gls) |
| 2013 | Artilheiros | | |
| 2014–2016 | CPK | 43 | (1) |
| 2016 | Cheng Fung | 6 | (2) |
| 2017 | Kei Lun | 12 | (0) |
| 2018 | CPK | 4 | (0) |
| 2019–2020 | Benfica | 19 | (2) |
| 2021–2022 | CPK | 19 | (3) |
| 2023– | Monte Carlo | 7 | (3) |
- * Club domestic league appearances and goals

Ismael Rolon Ortega (born 11 December 1994) is a footballer who plays as a right-back for Monte Carlo. Born in Paraguay, he has been called up to represent Macau internationally.

== Club career ==
In 2013, Ortega signed for Macau side Artilheiros. In 2014, he signed for Macau side CPK. In 2016, he signed for Macau side Cheng Fung. In 2017, he signed for Macau side Kei Lun. In 2018, he returned to Macau side CPK. In 2019, he signed for Macau side Benfica. In 2021, he returned to Macau side CPK. In 2023, he signed for Macau side Monte Carlo.

== International career ==
Ortega has been called up to the Macau national team. He is also eligible to represent Paraguay internationally, having been born in the country.

== Style of play ==
Ortega operates as a right-back. He has also operated as a central defender.

== Personal life ==
Ortega has worked as the owner of a football academy in Macau. He is married to a Ukrainian woman and they have a daughter together.
