= Ismaël Habib =

Canadian convict

Ismaël Habib (born 1988) is the first Canadian adult to be found guilty following a trial of a new Canadian law that prohibits people from trying to leave Canada to participate in the activities of a terrorist group. The Canadian law, section 83.181, was created by the conservative government of Stephen Harper in 2013. Habib had gone to Syria in 2013 and allegedly had contacts with jihadist groups fighting the Syrian government of Bashar al-Assad. Upon his return to Quebec, he made several attempts to acquire a false passport. He claims this was to find his wife and two children found in ISIL-controlled territory in Syria. However, the Canadian authorities claimed it was an effort on his part to join ISIL. In a long-running sting operation starting in 2015, the Royal Canadian Mounted Police (RCMP) implicated him in plans to join ISIL. Habib was first detained in February 2016 in Gatineau, Quebec, when he was charged with threatening his girlfriend in a domestic violence case. This led the authorities to charge him with the terror-related counts in Montreal. In June 2017, he was found guilty of attempting "to leave Canada to commit a terrorist act". On 29 September 2017, he was sentenced to nine years in prison including eight years for attempting to leave Canada and one year for providing false information to obtain a passport. The sentences are to be served consecutively minus the time he's already served in custody.
