= Ismail al-Din =

Egyptian politician

Ismail Nasr al-Din is an Egyptian politician and a member of the Egyptian parliament. His motions and draft bills have stirred up controversy in the country.

== Legislative career ==
In 2017, al-Din attempted to alter the Egyptian constitution to remove the presidential term limit to allow then President Abdel Fattah al-Sisi to run for reelection as “as he wishes” less than a year before his single term in office expires. The law requires at least 20 per cent signatures of the members of the parliament to alter Article 140 of the Constitution but al-Din fell short of the signatures as it sparked outrage both within and outside the parliament. In 2018, al-Din presented a bill to remove religion from Egyptian national IDs after collecting over 200 signatures of MPs. His bill sought to amend article 49 of the Egyptian Civil Code to prohibit any mention of religion denomination in all Egyptian national identity cards. The purpose of the law was to treat all Egyptian citizens fairly and equally regardless of their religious creed or affiliation.
