= Ismail Nanoua =

Lebanese actor and voice actor

- إسماعيل نعنوع
- Died: 22 June 2017
- Occupations: Actor, voice actor

Ismail Jamil Nanoua (Arabic: إسماعيل جميل نعنوع), (died 22 June 2017), is a Lebanese actor and voice actor.

== Filmography ==
=== Films ===
- Khallet Warde - Abu Subhi. 2011

=== Television ===
- Al Ghaliboun. 2011

=== Dubbing roles ===
- Alice in Wonderland - Dodo (Classical Arabic version)
- Matt Hatter Chronicles - Alfred Hatter
- Mokhtarnameh - Suleiman ibn Sird, Al-Muhallab ibn Abi Sufra
- Over the Garden Wall - Enoch, Mr. Langtree
- Planes: Fire & Rescue - Ol' Jammer
- Saint Mary
- Teen Titans: Trouble in Tokyo - Bookstore Owner, Mayor
- The Incredibles - Rick Dicker, The Underminer (Classical Arabic version)
- The Men of Angelos - The judge
- The Smurfs - Gargamel (Image Production House version)
- Uncle Grandpa
