= Ismail Gamadiid =

Somali politician (1960–2020)

Ismail Diriye Gamadiid (1960 – May 2020) was a Somali politician, teacher, environmentalist and community leader.

== Biography ==
Ismail hailed from the Buuhoodle Region. He completed his primary education in Xadadhan. He went to Cumar Samatar High School in Galkayo. He then went on to become a high school teacher in that same high school he had attended. Ismail's educations did not end there, he completed his undergraduate degree at Lafoole University majoring in biology. He was then awarded a scholarship to the prestigious Oxford University where he studied Environment and Agriculture. Upon completing his studies, he chose to return to his motherland and was appointed Director of the Somali Range Agency.

In 1998, Ismail migrated to Hamilton, New Zealand and worked for many years in his community. He was the President of the Waikato Refugee Forum as well as serving as President of the Muslim Association. He held these titles for over 10 years respectively. In New Zealand, for his contribution to community and refugee resettlement work here, Ismail received a Hamilton Civic Award in 2009. Ismail was instrumental in setting up Hamilton's first Islamic early childcare centre - a centre that had a policy to also employ non-Muslim teachers and invites enrollments from families across all faiths.

Ismail was also known as someone who championed the cause of Muslim girls learning to embrace New Zealand's outdoor pursuits from kayaking to abseiling and tramping. He played a pivotal role in convincing and supporting families to encourage girls to take up these activities with confidence. Ismail passionately championed many causes, but his biggest cause was always humanity. One of Ismail's many legacies was the impact he had on the integration, guidance and education of young Muslim former refugees and immigrants in Waikato.

In the light of the recent anti-racism rallies around the world and in New Zealand, Farouk says: "Ismail would be very pleased it’s not only Africans or people of colour marching but everyone. Justice transcends borders and cultures ... I know that’s what he would say ... look at all these people coming together." At the time he was president of the Waikato Muslim Association, there were nearly 40 different nationalities of Muslims at the Hamilton masjid. "You had to compromise, negotiate, bring them together. Ismail was a man of wisdom and had a natural power to negotiate."

Ismail negotiated with all the challenges that came his way as a refugee arriving in New Zealand. For 20 years he devoted his energy towards uplifting other refugees and immigrants here. It's as though his life came full circle, with him returning to help rebuild his country of birth and doing what he loved best – making a difference.

Mustafa Farouk says what his friend's life "exemplified is it's about looking after everybody ... it's about tenacity, about going against all odds to do something for someone where you don't get paid, where you don't even get 'thank you'.

"Ismail exemplified service. That's what I hope everybody will take from Ismail’s legacy." After living in New Zealand for many years, he and his family moved to Brisbane, Australia where he had lived for 4 years before returning to his homeland.

He was serving as Puntland's Minister of Agriculture, the Environment, and Climate Change at the time of his death in May 2020 from COVID-19.

=== Death ===
Ismail was among a group of Ministers who were providing aid in Qardho to families who had lost their homes and livelihoods in the deadly and severe floods. This is where he contracted COVID-19.

Somalia as a whole has been heavily impacted during the pandemic. He was transferred to a hospital in Mogadishu for treatment, where he remained hospitalized for several weeks.

Ismail Gamadiid's death from COVID-19 during the COVID-19 pandemic in Somalia at a Mogadishu hospital was confirmed on 25 May 2020. The Government of Puntland issued a statement stating, "We have lost the minister of environment and agriculture Ismail Gamadiid may his soul rest in peace," while President of Puntland Said Abdullahi Dani sent condolences to Gamadiid's family. In a statement, President Dani praised Gamadiid, "He had done a wonderful job. It's sad that we have lost him at the time the state needed him most. We send our condolences as a government to his family and friends across Somalia."
