= Sergio Muñoz (politician) =

American politician

Sergio Muñoz Jr.

Member of the Texas House of Representatives from the 36th district
- Incumbent
- Assumed office January 11, 2011
- Preceded by: Ismael Flores

Personal details
- Born: March 5, 1982 (age 44)
- Party: Democratic
- Education: University of Texas at Austin (BA); Texas Southern University (JD)
- Occupation: Attorney
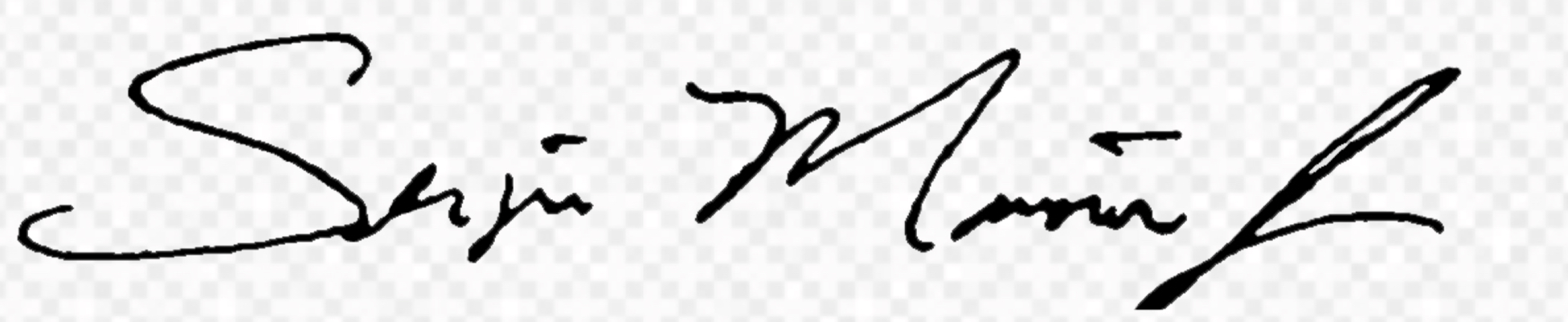
- Signature
- Website: Campaign website

Sergio Muñoz Jr. is an American attorney and Democratic member of the Texas House of Representatives, serving since 2011. He represents District 36 in Hidalgo County including the cities of Hidalgo, Granjeno, McAllen, Mission, Palmview, Alton, Palmhurst, and Pharr.

== Biography ==
Sergio Muñoz was raised in Mission, Texas. He received a bachelor's degree in business administration from the University of Texas at Austin and his Juris Doctor from the Thurgood Marshall School of Law at Texas Southern University. Muñoz owns and operates the Muñoz Law Firm.

His father, Sergio Muñoz Sr., served as a state representative for District 36 from 1993-1997.

== Texas House of Representatives ==
Muñoz served as Vice Chair of the House Insurance Committee during the 85th Legislative Session and Vice Chair of the House Land & Resource Management Committee in the 86th Legislative Session.

== Legislative Committees ==
Muñoz is currently serving as a member of the following committees:

- Agriculture & Livestock, Member
- Ways & Means, Member
