= Ismael Alicea =

Librarian who worked at the New York Public Library

- Alicea with Mayor Bloomberg in 2009
- Born: June 12, 1954; Adjuntas, Puerto Rico
- Died: April 13, 2015 (aged 60); Congers, New York
- Occupation: librarian

Ismael Alicea (1954–2015) was a librarian, particularly well known for his work at the New York Public Library. Alicea held many positions in the library over 36 years, starting as a clerk in 1971. He graduated from John Jay College with a Bachelor of Science degree and obtained his Master’s degree in Library and Information Science at Pratt Institute in 1982. and served as a librarian for many libraries in the Bronx. When he retired, Alicea was the associate director of adult education and outreach for the library. During his time at the library, Alicea collaborated with colleagues to compile several major bibliographies.

Alicea was also active in the Northeast chapter of REFORMA. This chapter established an award in his honor for members who are committed to serving the Latino community.

== See also ==
- List of Puerto Ricans
