= Ismael, Sar-e Pol =

Ismael إسماعيل
- Location in Afghanistan
- Coordinates: 35°55′57.24″N 66°30′47.23″E
- Country: Afghanistan
- Province: Sar-e Pol Province
- District: Sangcharak
- Time zone: UTC+4:30

Ismael or Ishmael (Pashto: إسماعيل Dari: إسماعيل) is a village in Sangcharak District at Sar-e Pol Province of Afghanistan. It is located in the northern part of Afghanistan, near the border of Turkmenistan. It is about a 2 hours drive from Mazari Sharif, which is the most prominent town in the area. It also has the closest airport near Ismael.

== See also ==
- Sar-e Pol Province

== Bibliography ==
- Mir Hosseini, Ali Naghi. (2009). Sangcharak in Bed Time, Vol. 1, Qum: Ishraq.
