= Isfael =

Welsh 6th c. saint

Saint Ismael

Bishop of Rhos
- Venerated in: Eastern Orthodox Church; Anglican Communion
- Feast: June 16; June 25 (at Uzmaston)
- Patronage: St. Ishmael's in Pembrokeshire and Carmarthenshire; Rhos

Isfael or Ismael (Old Welsh: Ysmail), often anglicised as Ishmael, was a 6th-century medieval Welsh bishop of Rhos and saint. He was allegedly also a Breton prince of Armorica.

Although his anglicized name invites association with the Biblical Ishmael, Isfael is actually a native Welsh name (or even epithet) meaning 'under prince'.

Isfael was said to have been the son of Budig ap Cybydan, a native of Cornouaille and eventual king of Armorica, and the brother of the martyr Tyfei and Bishop Euddogwy (Oudoceus) of Llandaff. His mother may have been Arianwedd or Anowed, the sister of Saint Teilo. In Rhygyfarch's hagiography, Isfael was said to have been one of the three principal disciples of Dewi Sant; in the Book of Llandaff, he is also included among the students of Dubricius and Teilo and said to have succeeded David as the bishop of Menevia (St David's). (Since he does not appear in that parish's records, it was Rees's opinion that he was at most a suffragan bishop under Teilo.) His eventual see was in Rhos at present-day St Ishmaels.

The parish churches of St Ishmael's in Pembrokeshire and Carmarthenshire and their surrounding communities are named in his honour. He was also the patron of the churches at Camrose, Rosemarket, Uzmaston, and (probably) Haroldston St Issells. A valley or inlet in Carmarthen Bay was previously known as "St. Ismael's Scar".

== Gallery ==
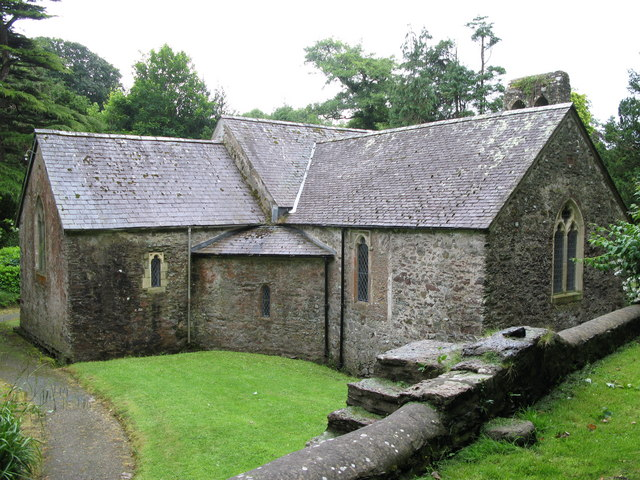
St Ishmael's church, Pembrokeshire

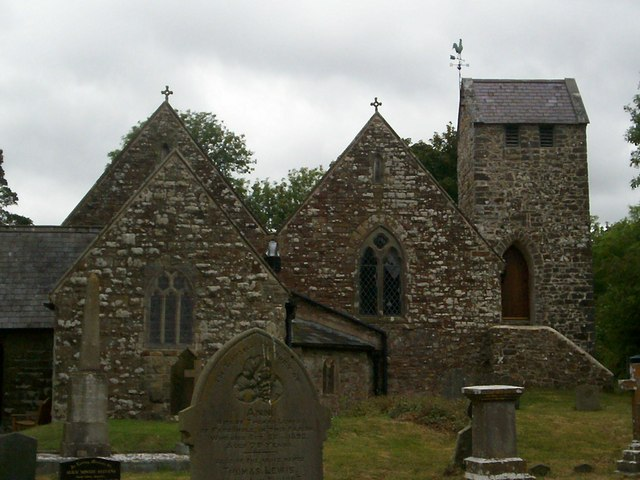
St. Ismael's Church, Uzmaston.

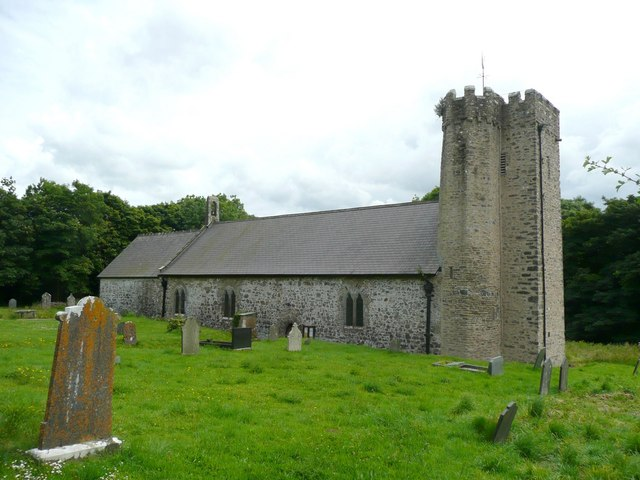
St Ishmael's parish church, Camrose
