= Altıntaş (surname) =

Altıntaş (IPA: [ˈaɫtɯntaʃ]) is a Turkish surname. Its meaning in the Turkish language is "Goldstone".

Notable people with the surname include:

- Batuhan Altıntaş (footballer) (born 1996), Turkish footballer
- Batuhan Altıntaş (sprinter) (born 1996), Turkish track and field runner
- Benan Altıntaş (born 2001), Turkish footballer
- Emircan Altıntaş (born 1995), Turkish footballer
- Hüseyin Altıntaş (born 1994), Turkish footballer
- Ilkay Altintas (born 1977), American computer scientist
- Mert Miraç Altıntaş (born 2001), Turkish footballer
- Mevlüt Mert Altıntaş (1994–2016), Turkish off duty officer and assassin of the Russian diplomat Andrei Karlov
- Mustafa Altıntaş (1939–2010), Turkish footballer
- Nergiz Altıntaş (born 1990), Turkish para table tennis player
- Tolga Altıntaş (born 1980), Turkish volleyball player
- Hakan Ramazan Altıntaş (born 1999), Turkish sprinter
- Tülin Altıntaş (born 1982), Turkish volleyball player
- Yaşar Altıntaş (born 1957), Turkish footballer
- Yusuf Altıntaş (born 1961), Turkish football former player and coach

== See also ==
- Altintas (disambiguation)
