= Batuhan Altıntaş =

Batuhan Altıntaş may refer to:

- Batuhan Altıntaş (footballer) (born 1996), Turkish football player
- Batuhan Altıntaş (sprinter) (born 1996), Turkish track and field sprinter
