= Mudanya Armistice House =

Museum and former house where the Mudanya Armistice was signed in Turkey

- Mudanya Mütareke Evi
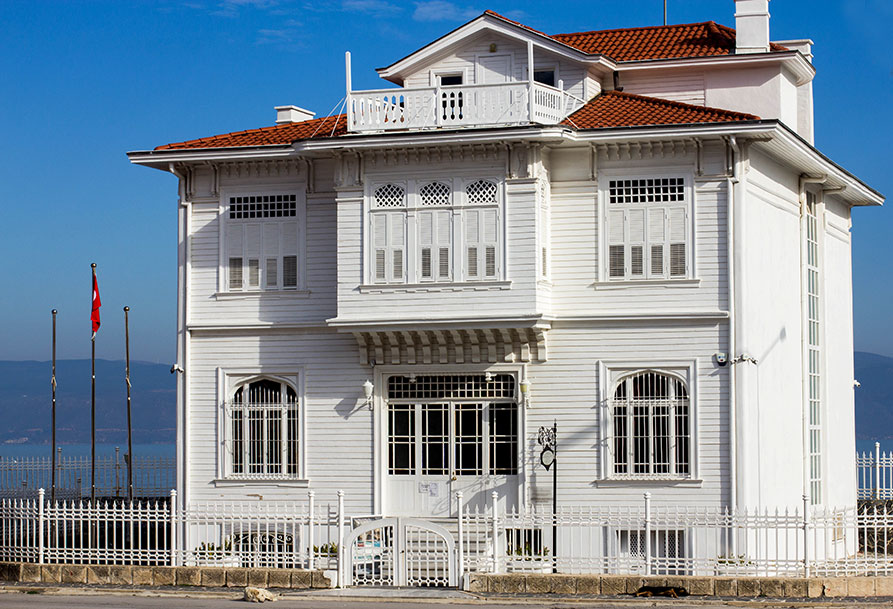
- Armistice house from the southwest

- Kırıkkale MKE Weapons Industry Museum
- Established: 1937; 89 years ago
- Coordinates: 40°22′47″N 28°52′54″E
- Type: Memorial House
- Owner: Ministry of Culture

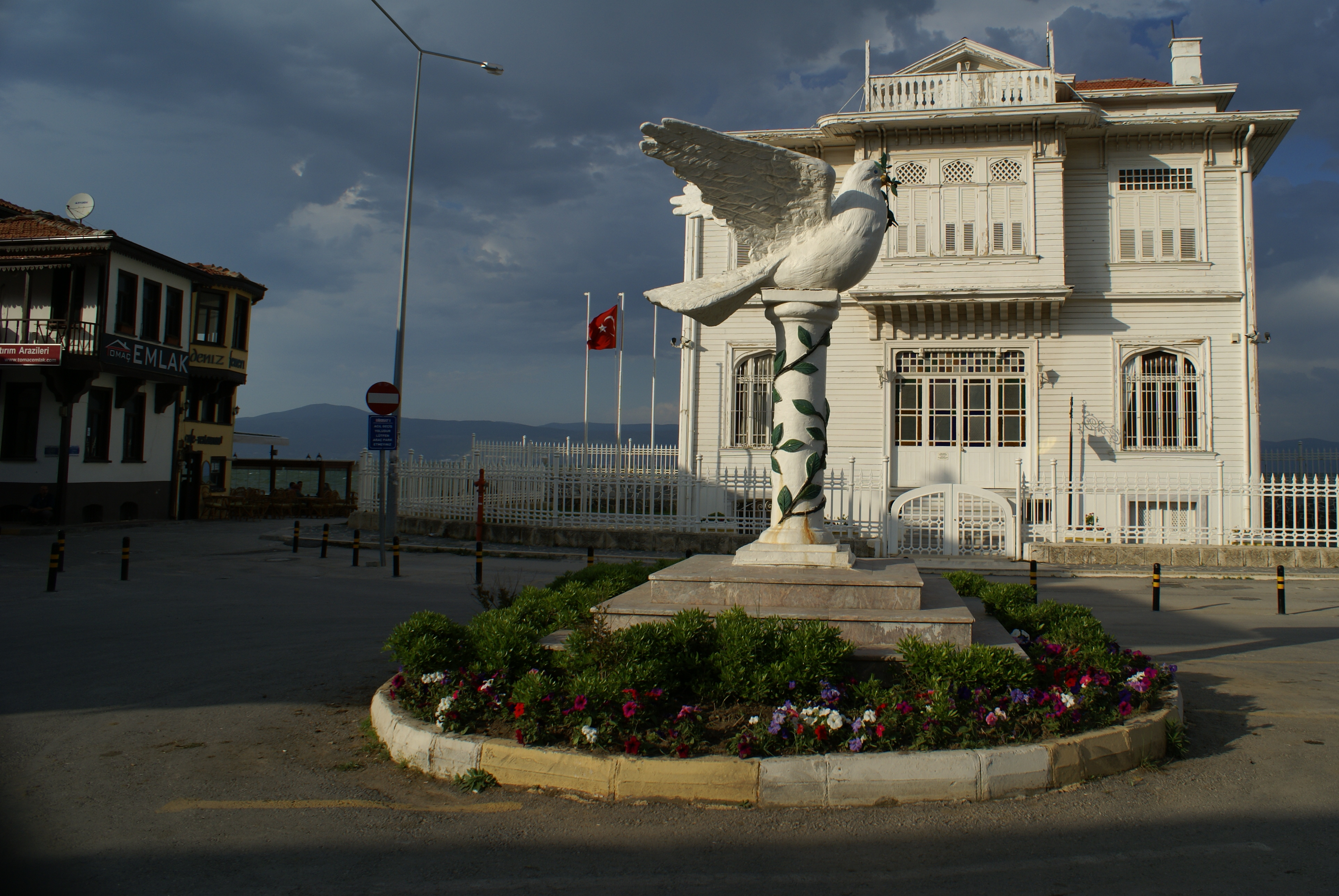

Mudanya Armistice House (Turkish: Mudanya Mütareke Evi) is a museum in Mudanya, Turkey. The museum is in the house where the treaty that acknowledged the Republic of Turkey was signed.

== Location and history ==
The two-storey stone museum is in Mudanya ilçe (district) of Bursa Province. It is on Oniki Eylül street running along the Marmara sea side. The house was built in the 19th century by a Russian merchant named Aleksandr Ganyanof, and then it was purchased by contractor Hayri İpar. The total land area is 800 metres (2,600 ft) and the base area of the house is 400 square metres (4,300 sq ft). It has 13 rooms and two large halls. In 1936, after a period of restoration, İpar donated the house to be used as a museum, and the next year, the museum opened to the public.

== Notability ==
The house is where the Armistice of Mudanya was signed after the Turkish War of Independence on 11 October 1922. By this treaty the Republic of Turkey was internationally acknowledged. During the talks, the Turkish side was represented by a delegation headed by İsmet İnönü (the president of Turkey from 1938–1950).

== The exhibits ==
The ground floor contains rooms of the signatories (Allies of World War I and Turkey). The upper floor is the living quarters of the Turkish delegation (İsmet İnönü, Asım Gündüz and others). One notable item is the marble table which was broken by İsmet İnönü when he struck the table during a heated discussion.
