= İsmail Akbay =

Turkish space scientist (1930–2003)

İsmail Akbay (October 17, 1930 – July 26, 2003) was a Turkish scientist. He is mostly remembered as the first Turk to work for NASA.

== Early life ==
He was born in Mudanya (Tirilye-Zeytinbağı) near Bursa, Turkey on October 17, 1930. Early on, Akbay was recognized as a gifted child with exceptional mental aptitude.

== Education ==
He graduated from Bursa Erkek Lisesi and Haydarpaşa Lisesi before choosing to move to the United States. In 1956, he received a B.S. degree in Engineering Physics from the University of Tennessee.

== Death ==
Akbay died in a fire at his home, reportedly while trying to save the family dog.

== Career ==
Akbay was personally selected by Dr. Wernher von Braun, the famous astronautical engineer, to be the lead aerospace engineer for the F1 Engine Integration on the Saturn V-S1C Rocket during the preparation phase of the Apollo 11 mission. Mr. Akbay also spearheaded the Saturn 1B/H-1 Engine Integration for the Apollo–Soyuz Rendezvous Mission. Between 1963 and 1975, Akbay served in various managerial capacities during NASA's Apollo, Skylab and Apollo–Soyuz projects.

His 31-year career at NASA earned him recognition as one of America's early space pioneers. In Turkey, at the end of the 1960s, newspaper headlines heralded him as "The Turk Who Helped Put Man on the Moon".

After his career with NASA, Akbay worked on the transfer of space technology to the U.S. private sector and the commercialization of other federally funded technologies.

During a meeting in 1996 about technology transfer, Akbay introduced Kaya Tuncer to the idea of building a Space Camp at the Aegean Free Zone. Until his death in July 2003, Akbay was an enthusiastic supporter of Space Camp Turkey, attending its opening ceremony in June 2000 and following its progress and developments.
