= 8th-century Byzantine domes =

With the decline in the empire's resources following losses in population and territory, domes in Byzantine architecture were used as part of more modest new buildings. The large-scale churches of Byzantium were, however, kept in good repair. By bracing the dome with broad arches on all four sides, the cross-domed unit provided a more secure structural system. These units, with most domes raised on drums, became a standard element on a smaller scale in later Byzantine church architecture, and all domes built after the transitional period were braced with bilateral symmetry.

== Constantinople ==
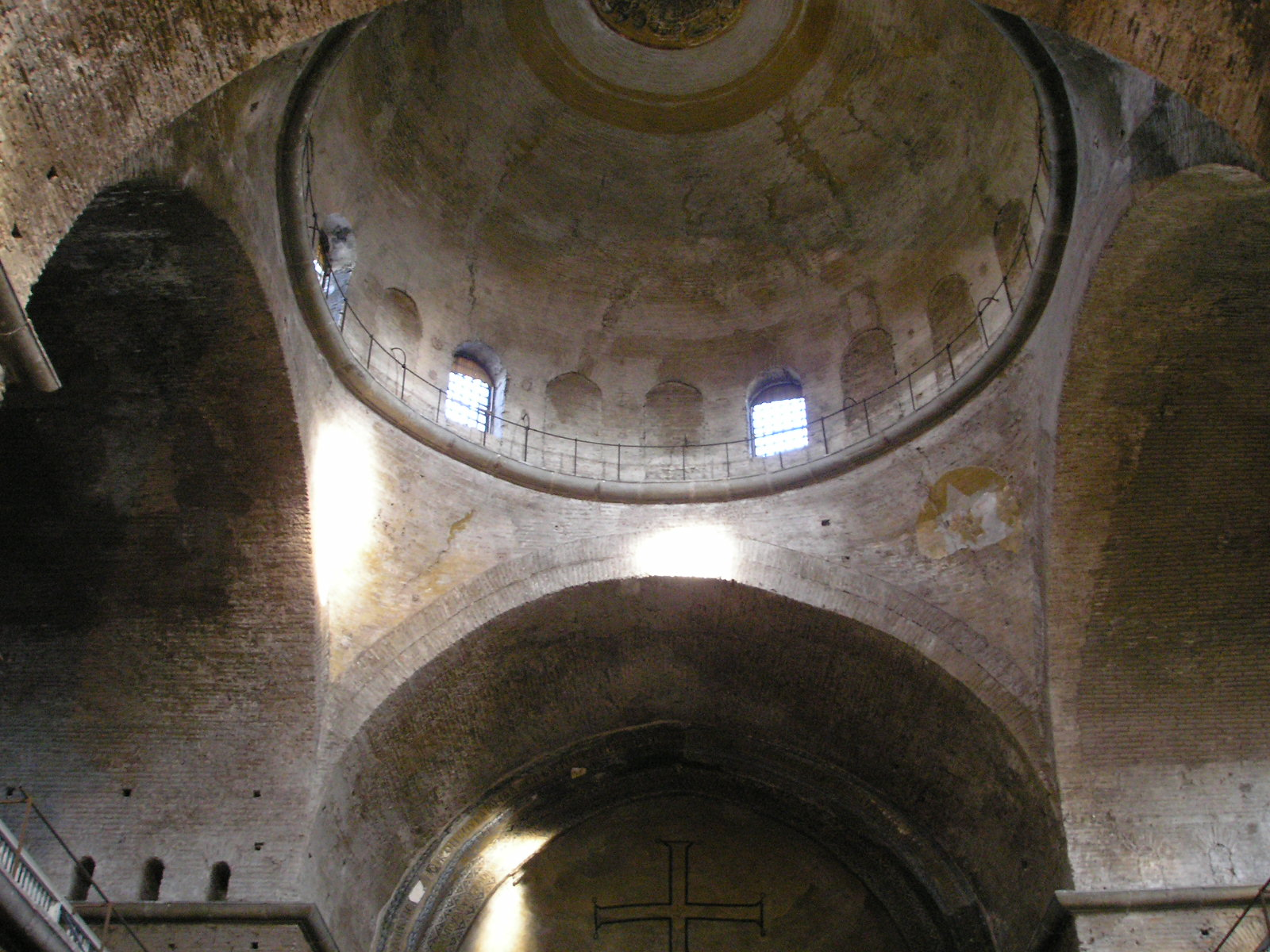
The Hagia Irene in Istanbul

The upper portion of the Church of Hagia Irene was thoroughly rebuilt after the 740 Constantinople earthquake. The nave was re-covered with an elliptical domical vault hidden externally by a low cylinder on the roof, in place of the earlier barrel vaulted ceiling, and the original central dome from the Justinian era was replaced with one raised upon a high windowed drum. The barrel vaults supporting these two new domes were also extended out over the side aisles, creating cross-domed units.

The Church of the Virgin of the Pharos, the main chapel of the Great Palace, was built by Constantine V. The central dome was umbrella-shaped and roofed by lead sheets. A 10th century homily by Photios describes the dome of the church as having "Christ in the form of a 'man-like' image in the midst of a throng of angels".

The dome over the Church of the Archangels at Sige was replaced in the 19th century, but the original was dated in the 18th century to 780.

== Turkey ==
Part of the fifth-century basilica of St. Mary at Ephesus seems to have been rebuilt in the eighth century as a cross-domed church, a development typical of the seventh to eighth centuries and similar to the cross-domed examples of Hagia Sophia in Thessaloniki, St. Nicholas at Myra, St. Clement's at Ankara, and the church of the Koimesis at Nicaea.

A small, unisex monastic community in Bithynia, near Constantinople, may have developed the cross-in-square plan church during the Iconoclastic period, which would explain the plan's small scale and unified naos. The ruined church of St. John at Pelekete Monastery is an early example. Monks had supported the use of icons, unlike the government-appointed secular clergy, and monasticism would become increasingly popular. A new type of privately funded urban monastery developed from the 9th century on, which may help to explain the small size of subsequent building.

== Sicily ==
The church architecture of Sicily has few examples from the Byzantine period, having been conquered by Muslims in 827, but quincunx churches exist with single domes on tall central drums and either Byzantine pendentives or Islamic squinches. Very little architecture from the Islamic period survives on the island, either.

== See also ==
- List of Roman domes
- History of architecture
