= Mesudiye =

Mesudiye may refer to:

- Mesudiye, Datça, a small village of Muğla Province in Turkey
- Mesudiye, Mudanya
- Mesudiye, Ordu, a district of Ordu Province in Turkey
- Ottoman battleship Mesudiye, pre-dreadnought battleship, launched 1874, sunk in 1914
