= Tirilye =

- Neighbourhood
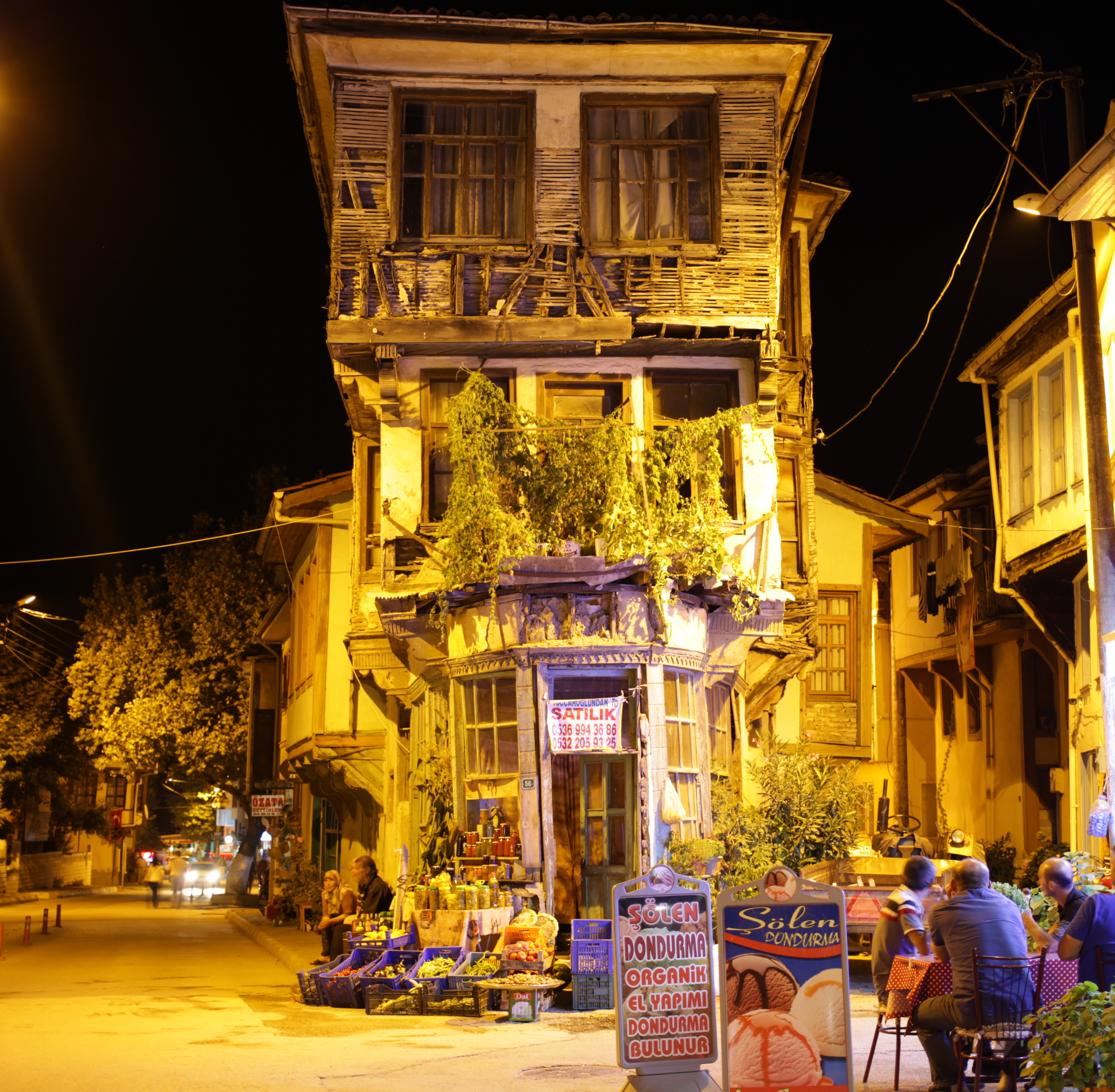
- Tirilye famous house

- Location within Turkey Location within Marmara
- Coordinates: 40°23′32″N 28°47′40″E
- Country: Turkey
- Province: Bursa
- District: Mudanya
- Population (2022): 1,409
- Time zone: UTC+3 (TRT)
- Area code: 0224

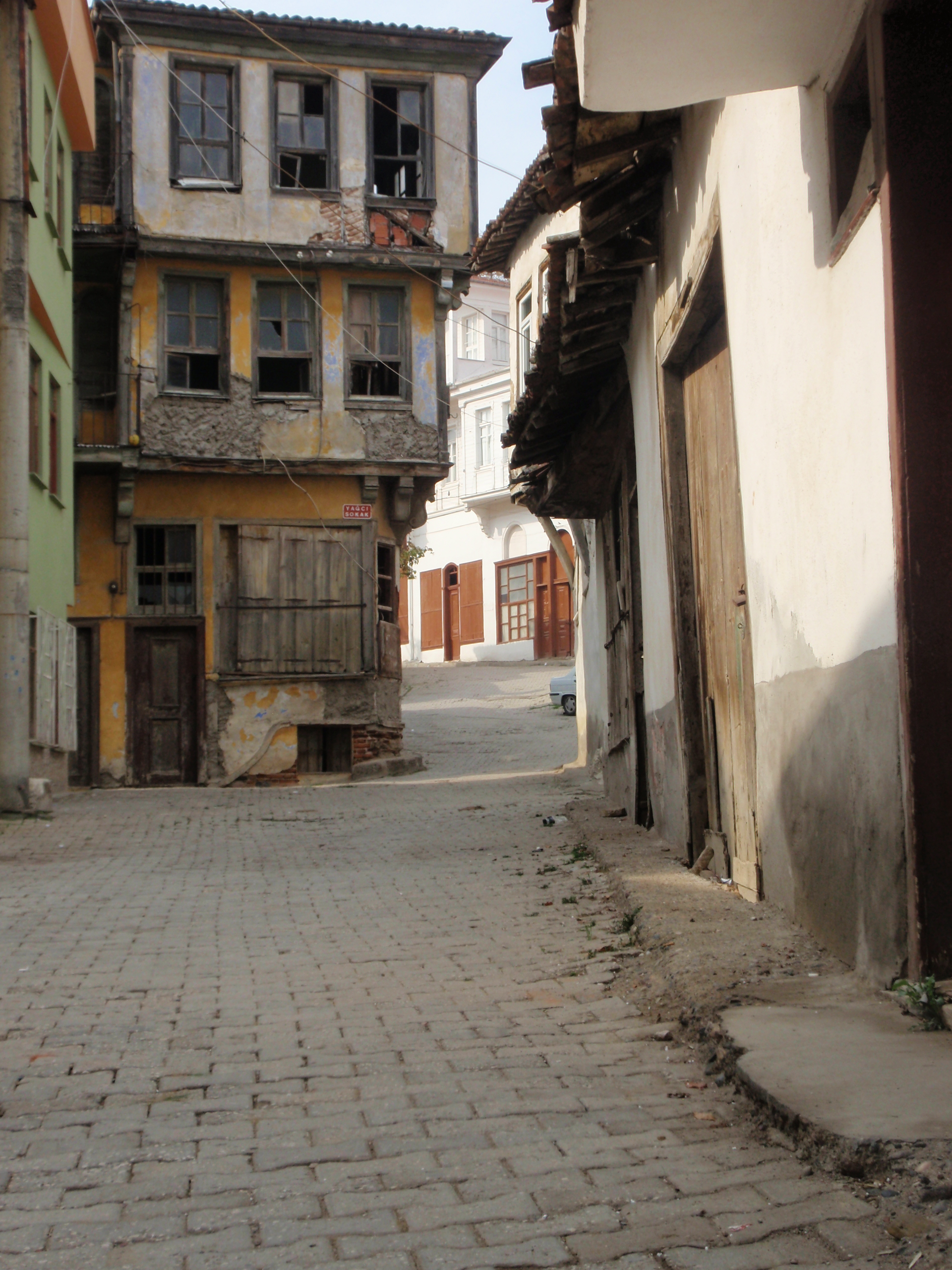
Street

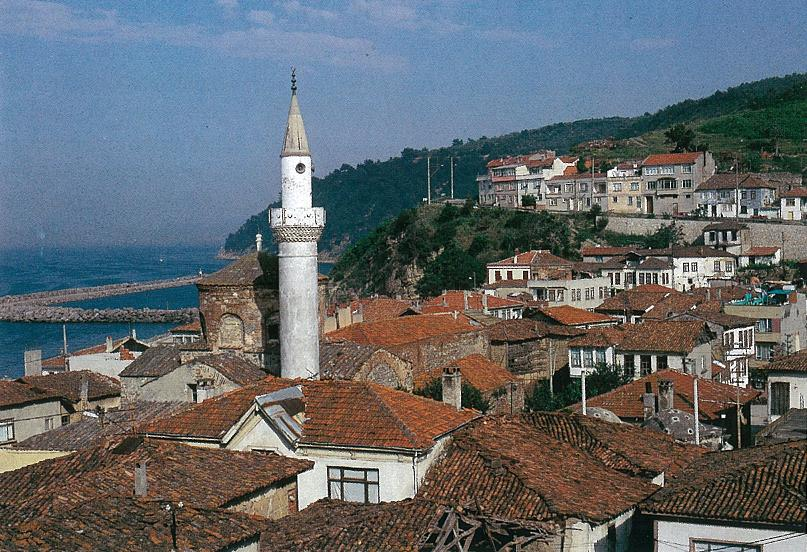
Zeytinbağı in 1990

Tirilye (between 1968 and 2012: Zeytinbağı, "Olive yard") is a neighbourhood of the municipality and district of Mudanya, Bursa Province, Turkey. Its population is 1,409 (2022). With the 2013 Turkish local government reorganisation, its town (belde) status and its municipality (belediye) were abolished, and it was made a neighbourhood (mahalle). It is situated 12 km (7.46 mi) west of Mudanya along the Marmara seashore. The area, which was inhabited since the eighth century BC, was formerly known as Τρίγλεια, Trigleia or Βρύλλειον, Brylleion in Greek. The most important historical structure in Tirilye (Triglia) is that of the Byzantine Haghios Stefanos Church (Hinolakkos Monastery, 780 AC), known today as the Fatih Mosque. Mudanya, a residential and commercial development in this township is under state protection as a historical site.

Tirilye has been an important religious center for Greek Orthodox Christians during Byzantine Empire. Of most churches and monasteries only ruins remain. Tirilye is a first level protected area since 1981 (decision of the High Council of Monuments 12588/13.3.1981) because of the Byzantine and Ottoman architectural monuments and is considered as an open-air museum thanks to the historical buildings and houses.

Only 1,400 people currently live in the town due to the impact of the 1923 population exchange between Greece and Turkey. Greek houses were built at the end of the 18th and 19th century prior to the population exchange between Greece and Turkey. Today, the town is under the protection of the Ministry of Culture meaning that old houses cannot be destroyed or rebuilt in a different style to the original one. The place is known for its olives and had historically been inhabited by Greek artisans engaged in the silk trade.

== History ==
The area has been host to various civilizations since antiquity. There are several legends about the origins of the name. One is that the area was famous for red mullet and red gurnard and that those fish were the main course of the Byzantine emperors' tables. "Trigleia" (Trigla lucerna) is a word in Greek for such fish.

Another legend comes from the Genoese. Three inhabitants of the village were distressed by the looting of pirates. Therefore, they combined their power and decided to live together. The name Tirilye is said to be derived from those three villagers.

When demand for the products of Southern Marmara from the ancient world increased, ports have been constructed in Kios (Gemlik), Kurşunlu, Apamea Myrlea(Mudanya), Siği (Kumyaka), and Trigleia and the region boomed. Christians use to live in Trigleia and Asia Minor many centuries before the Ottomans conquered the Byzantine Empire and established themselves in the area. Churches and monasteries were constructed in Trigleia and its surroundings on the patronage of Byzantine Emperors.

Osman Gazi's Turkmens in Bursa and surroundings have started settling in this location from the beginning of the year 1303, although the majority of the population was (Greek Orthodox) Christians. Kaymak Oba, Mirza Oba and Çepni villages located at the back of Tirilye are believed to have been established during this era. After Mudanya was conquered in 1321 Tirilye's ports and other ports in the region started being used. The land at the western parts of Bursa namely the area between current Minor Industry Area (Küçük Sanayi Bölgesi) and Uluabat Lake were very fertile. Grapes, cocoons and cereal crops were grown in this region. In addition the Tahtalı, Demirci and Doğancı regions had high quality wood used in the production of ships. There are signs proving a Genoese cargo boat has visited Tirilye port in the 1330s.

According to Ottoman sources in 1521 and 1573, cash tax of 46 thousand coins was paid. In 1521 180 Greek households lived in the village, and in 1573 280 Greek households lived in 9 Greek neighborhoods. In addition, there were 23 Muslim households on this date. As can be seen, after 1521, Islamization intensified in Trigleia and a neighborhood was established with 23 Muslim soldiers. It is understood from the presence of the imam that there is also a mosque in this neighborhood (Raif Kaplanoglu). During 1692 there were 234 non Muslim houses in Trigleia which means 936 non Muslims persons (SOURCE: BOA: Bab-ı Defteri, D.CMH. d, Defter No:26632). In 1870, there were 1715 people, 1660 Greeks, 55 Turks, in Tirili, and in 1895 199 Turks and 3,657 Greeks, a total of 3856 people according to the Annual Book of 1895. (Ertürk, 2009, p. 8 ).

Even after the Ottoman Empire absorbed the area, it remained Greek-populated. Although some Muslims from several areas in Anatolia had settled here the Christian population remained in the majority. At the end of the 19th century, 3,657 Greeks lived in the town against 199 Muslims. By 1920, only 20-25 Turkish households remained in Tirilye. In fact, when the war escalated, Captain Phillip of Tirilye took all the villagers on his ship and set sail for the Muslims. But then these Muslims from Tirilye landed in Tekirdağ and sent their Greek neighbors to Greece from here.

After the Greco-Turkish War (1919–1922) and the population exchange between Greece and Turkey that followed the Greeks had to leave the village. The Greeks migrated to Greece with the help of local businessman and ship owner Phillipos Kavounidis. The refugees were taken mainly to two places 1) to Rafina, near Athens, where icons from the churches can currently be seen inside one of the local churches and 2) to Nea Triglia, Chalkidiki. In turn, Muslim immigrants mainly from Crete, Salonica (Thessaloniki and Langadas) and other places were settled in Tirilye.

== Fatih Mosque ==
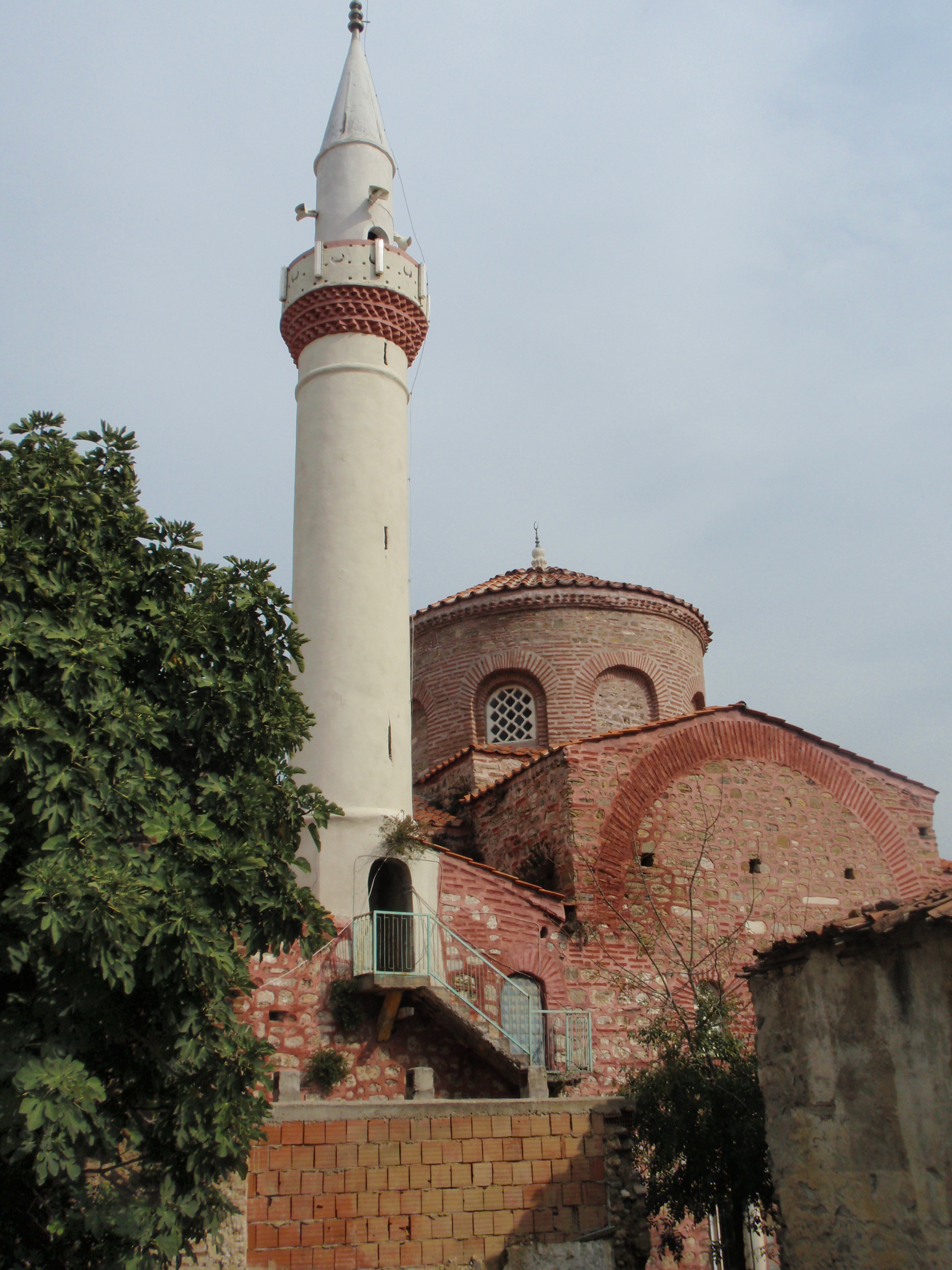
Fatih Mosque

The Fatih Mosque (Turkish: Fatih Camii) is a mosque in Tirilye, which was converted in 1661 from an eighth-century Byzantine church dedicated to Saint Stefanos (Moni Hinolakou- Μονή Χηνολάκκου). The building was constructed about 710 AD, originally as the Church of Christ and Saint Stefanos. After the Ottoman conquest of the town, it was converted (in 1661) to a mosque and named "Fatih", which means "conqueror". The mosque was briefly rededicated as a church during the Greek occupation of the area in the Greco-Turkish War of 1921–1922.

The church is the oldest Byzantine building in the region, and has protected status. It is of the typical Byzantine cross-in-square style and has Byzantine column headings at the entrance and a dome 19 metres (62 feet) high. The mosque is entered thorough a portico covered with a wooden roof which is standing on four columns that have ornamented metal headings. The building has a mihrab that is covered with a half-dome. It has been declared as a protected monument by 1299/31.8.1990 decision of BURSA KÜLTÜR ve TABİAT VARLIKLARINI KORUMA KURULU BÜRO MÜDÜRLÜĞÜ.

== New Stone School (Taş Mektep) ==
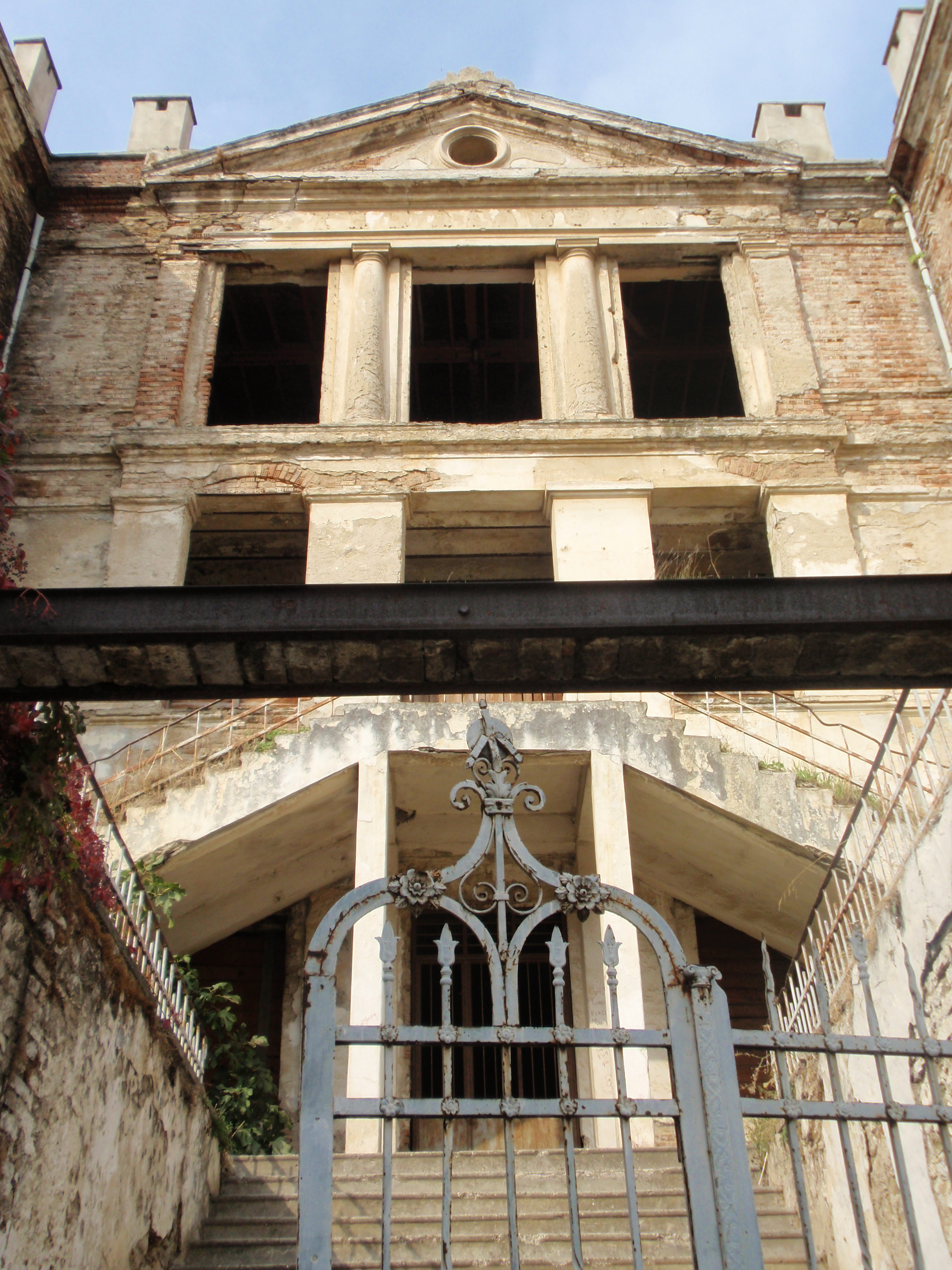
Taş Mektep

The New Stone School, built on an idea of Metropolitan Chrysostomos (born in Trigleia in 1867), in a markedly neoclassical style, is the largest building in town. The construction of the magnificent building started in 1909 and was completed three years later (1912). It is situated on an area of 965 square metres (10,390 square feet), is four stories high and is located on the hill at the west of İskele Street. In 1924 after the establishment of the republic it is opened as a school called Dar-ül Eytam for orphans, who were the children of soldiers that died in the war. The building served as a boarding school, a primary school and a secondary school later on. The historical building that was evacuated in 1989 was transferred to Uludağ University first and then was transferred to Zeytinbağı Municipality for restorations. It has been declared as a protected monument by 1299/31.8.1990 decision of BURSA KÜLTÜR ve TABİAT VARLIKLARINI KORUMA KURULU BÜRO MÜDÜRLÜĞÜ. Restoration was completed in spring 2021.

== Yperagia Theotokos-Virgin Mary-Mitropoli, Tirilye ==
The complex, which was constructed in Tirilye in 1834 as a Greek Church and reconstructed in 1894 by a Sultan's permit, after 1924 The Dar-ül Eytam School, which opens to the Stone School (being used for the workshops for carpentry and iron works for 400 students), and the Agios Georgios Ano church, known as "Dündar House", used as a mess house. The church had three vertical lines similar to all other churches(Vertical lines are separated with columns), but the abscissa of the church was demolished for creating a new entrance, causing the upper part of the entrance to be higher than the sides. After 1980 this entrance closed and the building returned to the original status. The Church building was used as a mess hall until the school was closed. Due to its function it was called "mess hall" until its restoration, which turned the building into Faruk Çelik Cultural Center. It has been declared as a protected monument by 1299/31.8.1990 decision of Bursa Kültür ve Tabiat Varlıklarını Koruma Kurulu Büro Müdürlüğü. Upon the request of the Greek Culture Delegation a ceremony was held in this building during the visit of the Ecumenical Patriarch of Constantinople Bartholomew I to Tirilye on July 1, 2009. Starting in 2019, Theophany celebrations are held each year (19 January, Epiphany according to the Julian Calendar) by Patriarch Bartholomew.

== Churches in the city ==
In Tirilye were seven churches, three monasteries and three holy springs in Zeytinbağı however only four of these churches have survived up until now and are Agios Stefanos or Moni Hinolakou (Fatih Camii since 1661), Panagia Pantovasilissa (Kemer Kilise), Agios Georgios Ano (known as Dundar's House) and Virgin Mary-Mitropoli. All four have been declared as a protected monuments by 1299/31.8.1990 decision of Bursa Kültür ve Tabiat Varlıklarını Koruma Kurulu Büro Müdürlüğü. Of the monasteries, only Agios Ioannis Theologos (Pelekete) Monastery has even partially survived among the three monasteries and the area around it has been declared as archeological area by 3996/27.9.2013 decision of the same Bureau. On one of the demolished churches (Agios Yoannis), after 1924, the Tirilye Town Hall has been built. The ruins of the three monasteries, which were built during the Byzantine era, are out of Tirilye. One of these is the Medikion Monastery (Hagios Sergios Monastery) located on the road to Eşkel Village. The monastery was built during the eighth century and is now operated as a farm. Today, all that remains are the perimeter walls, and the magnificent entrance doors, being200 kg (441 lb). The monastery has been declared as a protected monument by 1299/31.8.1990 decision of the same Bureau. The ruin of the second monastery is 5 km (3 mi) far from the town and is called Hagios Ioannis Theologos (Pelekete) Aya Yani Monastery, which is known as the Ayani Ranch by the public. The monastery was built in 709 and used until 1922; only some ruins of the church and walls are remaining today. As said, the area around the monastery has been declared as archeological area by 3996/27.9.2013 decision of the same Bureau. The third ruin is that of the Vatheos Rhyakos Soterios Monastery known as the Aya Sotiri by the public. Most of the buildings of the monastery are ruined. However, their owners still use some buildings as shelters. Ottomans, who settled in the area during Yavuz Sultan Selim Time, also built a hammam (bathhouse) and a school in 1907. Those structures are regarded as important historical locations, which have also survived into the modern day.

== Panagia Pantobasilissa (Lady Queen of All) Church ==
Panagia Pantobasilissa or Arched Church as it is called in the region is known to be the first church where the walls were decorated with frescoes.

It is indicated in some handwritten scripts that the church was dedicated to Panagia Pantobasillissa (Mary Queen of All). The church is based on a Greek cross plan to in the east and west directions. Although the building is not used since 1922 it has still survived. According to Triglian Tr. Evangelides (Βρύλλειον, 1934) the church was constructed in 780 AD, but according to the construction style of its walls, some claim that it was constructed at the end of the 13th century. The church has pictures on its walls at different layers and is considered to be very important for Christians. The first layer of frescos were made at the start of the 14th century, the second layer of frescos were made in 1723. It is believed that the columns were brought from Alexandria. There are support pillars at the façades and the public calls the building as the Arched Church. It has been declared as a protected monument by 1299/31.8.1990 decision of BURSA KÜLTÜR ve TABİAT VARLIKLARINI KORUMA KURULU BÜRO MÜDÜRLÜĞÜ. The parcel and the buildings belongs to the Ecumenical Patriarchate since 2011.

== Agios Georgios Ano-Dündar House ==
The Agios Georgios Ano Greek Church, which is known as the Dündar House in the region, has been transferred to private property after Greeks were forced to depart the region. It is located in the north of Taş Mektep (New School built by Metropolitan Chrysostomos from 1909 to 1912). It was reconstructed at the end of the 19th century and has a basilical plan type. The wooden main entrance door in the middle of the western wall has two wings. The door opening is framed by a round arch that sits on the marble pilasters, as well as a rectangular frame consisting of a pilaster on the sides and a two-step lintel at the top. Three-floored western part of the church was used as a residence but currently is closed. There are two windows on each side of the two rows of windows that illuminate the narthex on the sides of this door. The lower row windows are rectangular near the square, the upper row is narrower and longer. There are Byzantine decorations and stone ornaments on its walls. It has been declared as a protected monument by 1299/31.8.1990 decision of BURSA KÜLTÜR ve TABİAT VARLIKLARINI KORUMA KURULU BÜRO MÜDÜRLÜĞÜ. During September 2021 Mudanya Mayor Hyari Turkyilmaz announced his project to expropriate this monument and bring it to urban life.

== Monastery of Hagios Sergios ==
It is located at the beginning of the road that leaves the main road in the south of Tirilye and leads to the land with olive groves. The monastery was established in the late eighth century, and produced some important iconodule figures during the Byzantine Iconoclasm. After that, its history is obscure; it is mentioned in 1054, and it is known that it burned down and was rebuilt in 1800–01, but had fallen into disuse by the end of the 19th century, Today, only the outer wall of the complex survives. It has been declared as a protected monument by 1299/31.8.1990 decision of BURSA KÜLTÜR ve TABİAT VARLIKLARINI KORUMA KURULU BÜRO MÜDÜRLÜĞÜ.

== Agios Ioannis-Pelekete Monastery ==
The ruin of the monastery is 5 km (3 mi) far from the town and is called Hagios Ioannes Theologos (Pelekete) Aya Yani Monastery, which is known as the Ayani Ranch by the public. The monastery was built in 709 and used until 1922; only the ruins of the church and walls are remaining today.

== Batheos Rhyakos Soteros Monastery ==
The ruins of the monastery belong to Batheos Rhyakos Soteros Monastery known as the Aya Sotiri by the public. Most of the buildings of the monastery are ruined however their owners use some buildings as shelters.

== Christ-Sauveur / Ruissau-Profond Monastery ==
It was built in 956.

== Kapanca Port ==
The antic port, which is in the Kapanca Districts of Tirilye, dates back to the Roman era; it was the most important port for transportation during its time. It has been understood that the Genoese have used Tirilye and Apemeia (Mudanya) ports for transporting the salt extracted from the northern part of Appolonia Lake. Tirilye was an important port for exporting the goods produced in the fertile lands to the center of the Byzantine Empire.

== Swallow's Nest (Historical Pine Teahouse) (Tarihi Çamlı Kahve) ==
The Historical Pine Coffee lies on a high hill past the Stone School and is referred as the balcony of Tirilye. This area is used as a teahouse and overlooks the sea and olive orchards.

== Turkish bath ==
The exact name and construction date is not known of the hamam (Turkish Bath) which is located at the same building lot with the Fatih Mosque and in the southern side of it; however, there is information to the effect that it was built by Turks brought from Kastamonu and Üsküdar during Yavuz Sultan Selim's era in the first half of the 16th century.

The building features a rectangular plan schema consisting of five spaces. Its walls were laid with rough stone and brick; in the laying system, typical lighting gaps peculiar to baths were allowed. The space above the göbek taşı (heated marble platform on which one lies to sweat in a Turkish bath) is covered with two small domes. Other spaces are covered with broken-roof. Despite its quite well-preserved condition in physical terms, it is not being used today. It has been declared as a protected monument by 1299/31.8.1990 decision of Bursa Kültür ve Tabiat Varlıklarını Koruma Kurulu Büro Müdürlüğü. The building is renovated.

== International relations ==
Tirilye is twinned with:

- Rafina, Greece
- Triglia, Greece
- Gaspra, Ukraine

== Notable people ==
- Ismail Akbay (October 17, 1930 – 2003) was the first Turk who worked for NASA.
- Chrysostomos of Smyrna (1867-1922) also known as Saint Chrysostomos of Smyrna.
