= Altıntaş (disambiguation) =

Altıntaş is a town and a district of Kütahya Province, Turkey.

Altıntaş (literally "golden rock") may also refer to:

- Altıntaş, Alaca
- Altıntaş, Aşkale
- Altıntaş, Bozdoğan, a village in the district of Bozdoğan, Aydın Province, Turkey
- Altıntaş, Çelikhan, a village in the district of Çelikhan, Adıyaman Province, Turkey
- Altıntaş, İliç
- Altıntaş, Kalecik, a village in the district of Kalecik, Ankara Province, Turkey
- Altıntaş, Keşan
- Altıntaş, Midyat, an Assyrian/Syriac village in the district of Midyat, Mardin Province, Turkey
- Altıntaş, Mudanya
- Altıntaş (surname), a Turkish surname (including a list of people with the name)
