= Çekrice, Mudanya =

Village in Turkey

Çekrice
- Neighbourhood
- Location in Turkey Çekrice (Marmara)
- Coordinates: 40°16′N 28°47′E
- Country: Turkey
- Province: Bursa
- District: Mudanya
- Population (2022): 380
- Time zone: UTC+3 (TRT)

Çekrice is a neighbourhood in the municipality and district of Mudanya, Bursa Province in Turkey. Its population is 380 (2022).
