= Mirzaoba, Mudanya =

Village in Turkey

Mirzaoba
- Neighbourhood
- Country: Turkey
- Province: Bursa
- District: Mudanya
- Population (2022): 494
- Time zone: UTC+3 (TRT)

Mirzaoba is a neighbourhood in the municipality and district of Mudanya, Bursa Province in Turkey. Its population is 494 (2022).
