= Çamlık, Mudanya =

Village in Turkey

Çamlık
- Neighbourhood
- Location in Turkey Çamlık (Marmara)
- Coordinates: 40°20′20″N 28°35′56″E
- Country: Turkey
- Province: Bursa
- District: Mudanya
- Population (2022): 109
- Time zone: UTC+3 (TRT)

Çamlık is a neighbourhood in the municipality and district of Mudanya, Bursa Province in Turkey. Its population is 109 (2022).
