= Balabancık, Mudanya =

Village in Turkey

Balabancık
- Neighbourhood
- Location in Turkey Balabancık (Marmara)
- Coordinates: 40.2670°N 28.8116°E
- Country: Turkey
- Province: Bursa
- District: Mudanya
- Population (2022): 390
- Time zone: UTC+3 (TRT)

Balabancık is a neighbourhood in the municipality and district of Mudanya, Bursa Province in Turkey. Its population is 390 (2022).
