= Çağrışan, Mudanya =

Village in Turkey

Çağrışan
- Neighbourhood
- Location in Turkey Çağrışan (Marmara)
- Coordinates: 40°18′N 28°56′E
- Country: Turkey
- Province: Bursa
- District: Mudanya
- Population (2022): 3,884
- Time zone: UTC+3 (TRT)

Çağrışan is a neighbourhood in the municipality and district of Mudanya, Bursa Province in Turkey. Its population is 3,884 (2022).
