= Eğerce, Mudanya =

Village in Turkey

Eğerce
- Neighbourhood
- Location in Turkey Eğerce (Marmara)
- Coordinates: 40°21′40″N 28°37′55″E
- Country: Turkey
- Province: Bursa
- District: Mudanya
- Population (2022): 286
- Time zone: UTC+3 (TRT)

Eğerce (also: Eyerci) is a neighbourhood in the municipality and district of Mudanya, Bursa Province in Turkey. Its population is 286 (2022).

The village was present during the Ottoman period, and archival evidence suggests that the village is more than 420 years old. In the 17th century the village was a Christian village and the name of it was "Eğerciler", which meant "saddle-makers" in Turkish. The village was providing sheep to the capital in the beginning of the 17th century.
