= Söğütpınar, Mudanya =

Village in Turkey

Söğütpınar
- Neighbourhood
- Location in Turkey Söğütpınar (Marmara)
- Coordinates: 40.339°N 28.650°E
- Country: Turkey
- Province: Bursa
- District: Mudanya
- Population (2022): 265
- Time zone: UTC+3 (TRT)

Söğütpınar is a neighbourhood in the municipality and district of Mudanya, Bursa Province in Turkey. Its population is 265 (2022).
