= Orhaniye, Mudanya =

Village in Turkey

Orhaniye
- Neighbourhood
- Country: Turkey
- Province: Bursa
- District: Mudanya
- Population (2022): 201
- Time zone: UTC+3 (TRT)

Orhaniye is a neighbourhood in the municipality and district of Mudanya, Bursa Province in Turkey. Its population is 201 (2022).
