= Yörükali, Mudanya =

Village in Turkey

Yörükali
- Neighbourhood
- Country: Turkey
- Province: Bursa
- District: Mudanya
- Population (2022): 565
- Time zone: UTC+3 (TRT)

Yörükali (also: Yürükali) is a neighbourhood in the municipality and district of Mudanya, Bursa Province in Turkey. Its population is 565 (2022).
