= Yalıçiftlik, Mudanya =

Village in Turkey

Yalıçiftlik
- Neighbourhood
- Location in Turkey Yalıçiftlik (Marmara)
- Coordinates: 40°21′N 28°43′E
- Country: Turkey
- Province: Bursa
- District: Mudanya
- Population (2022): 440
- Time zone: UTC+3 (TRT)

Yalıçiftlik is a neighbourhood in the municipality and district of Mudanya, Bursa Province in Turkey. Its population is 440 (2022).
