= Kaymakoba, Mudanya =

Village in Turkey

Kaymakoba
- Neighbourhood
- Location in Turkey Kaymakoba (Marmara)
- Coordinates: 40°20′N 28°46′E
- Country: Turkey
- Province: Bursa
- District: Mudanya
- Population (2022): 343
- Time zone: UTC+3 (TRT)

Kaymakoba is a neighbourhood in the municipality and district of Mudanya, Bursa Province in Turkey. Its population is 343 (2022).
