= Dereköy, Mudanya =

Village in Turkey

Dereköy
- Neighbourhood
- Location in Turkey Dereköy (Marmara)
- Coordinates: 40.317°N 28.801°E
- Country: Turkey
- Province: Bursa
- District: Mudanya
- Population (2022): 524
- Time zone: UTC+3 (TRT)

Dereköy is a neighbourhood in the municipality and district of Mudanya, Bursa Province in Turkey. Its population is 524 (2022).
