= Chemin de Fer Moudania Brousse =

Former Turkish railway

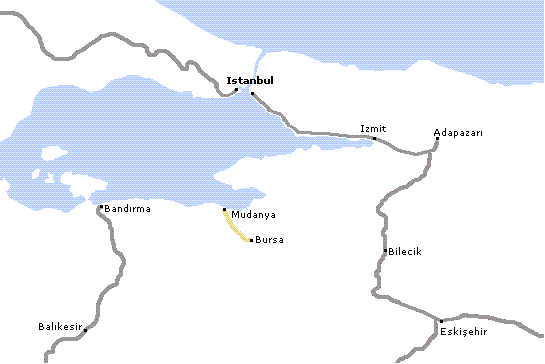
- CFMB in Yellow, other railways in grey

Overview
- Headquarters: Bursa
- Reporting mark: CFMB
- Locale: Mudanya to Bursa
- Dates of operation: 1871–1948
- Successor: Bursaray

Technical
- Track gauge: 1,000 mm (3 ft 3 3/8 in)
- Length: 41 km (25 mi)

The chemin de fer Moudania Brousse, (English: Mudanya Bursa Railway, Turkish: Mudanya Bursa Demiryolu), or CFMB was a 41-kilometre (25 mi) long railway line from the port of Mudanya to Bursa.

== History ==
On August 14, 1871, the Ottoman Government started to build a line from the port city of Mudanya to the inland city of Bursa. During construction, the line was sold to two French investors in 1874. The Ottoman empire used 185,000 lira to finance the project. The railway reached Bursa and was finished in 1875. The railway was to be continued to Bozüyük where it would connect with the CFOA line, but the tracks were never laid. On January 2, 1891 Georges Nagelmackers paid £27,000 for the rail line. In 1932 the Turkish State Railways (TCDD) bought the line. The railway was not very profitable, so in 1948, TCDD abandoned the line.

== Bursaray ==
The Bursaray light rail system started operating in 2002 as an urban transit option. Although one of its lines follow approximately the same route, Bursaray does not go as far as Mudanya.

== See also ==
- Bursaray
- TCDD
