= Işıklı, Mudanya =

Village in Turkey

Işıklı
- Neighbourhood
- Country: Turkey
- Province: Bursa
- District: Mudanya
- Population (2022): 370
- Time zone: UTC+3 (TRT)

Işıklı is a neighbourhood in the municipality and district of Mudanya, Bursa Province in Turkey. Its population is 370 (2022).
