= Yörükyenicesi, Mudanya =

Village in Turkey

Yörükyenicesi
- Neighbourhood
- Location in Turkey Yörükyenicesi (Marmara)
- Coordinates: 40°17′N 28°41′E
- Country: Turkey
- Province: Bursa
- District: Mudanya
- Population (2022): 368
- Time zone: UTC+3 (TRT)

Yörükyenicesi (also: Yürükyenicesi) is a neighbourhood in the municipality and district of Mudanya, Bursa Province in Turkey. Its population is 368 (2022).
