= Göynüklü, Mudanya =

Village in Turkey

Göynüklü
- Neighbourhood
- Location in Turkey Göynüklü (Marmara)
- Coordinates: 40°19′30″N 28°57′18″E
- Country: Turkey
- Province: Bursa
- District: Mudanya
- Population (2022): 1,571
- Time zone: UTC+3 (TRT)

Göynüklü is a neighbourhood in the municipality and district of Mudanya, Bursa Province in Turkey. Its population is 1,571 (2022).
