= Armistice of Mudanya =

1922 armistice ending the Turkish War of Independence

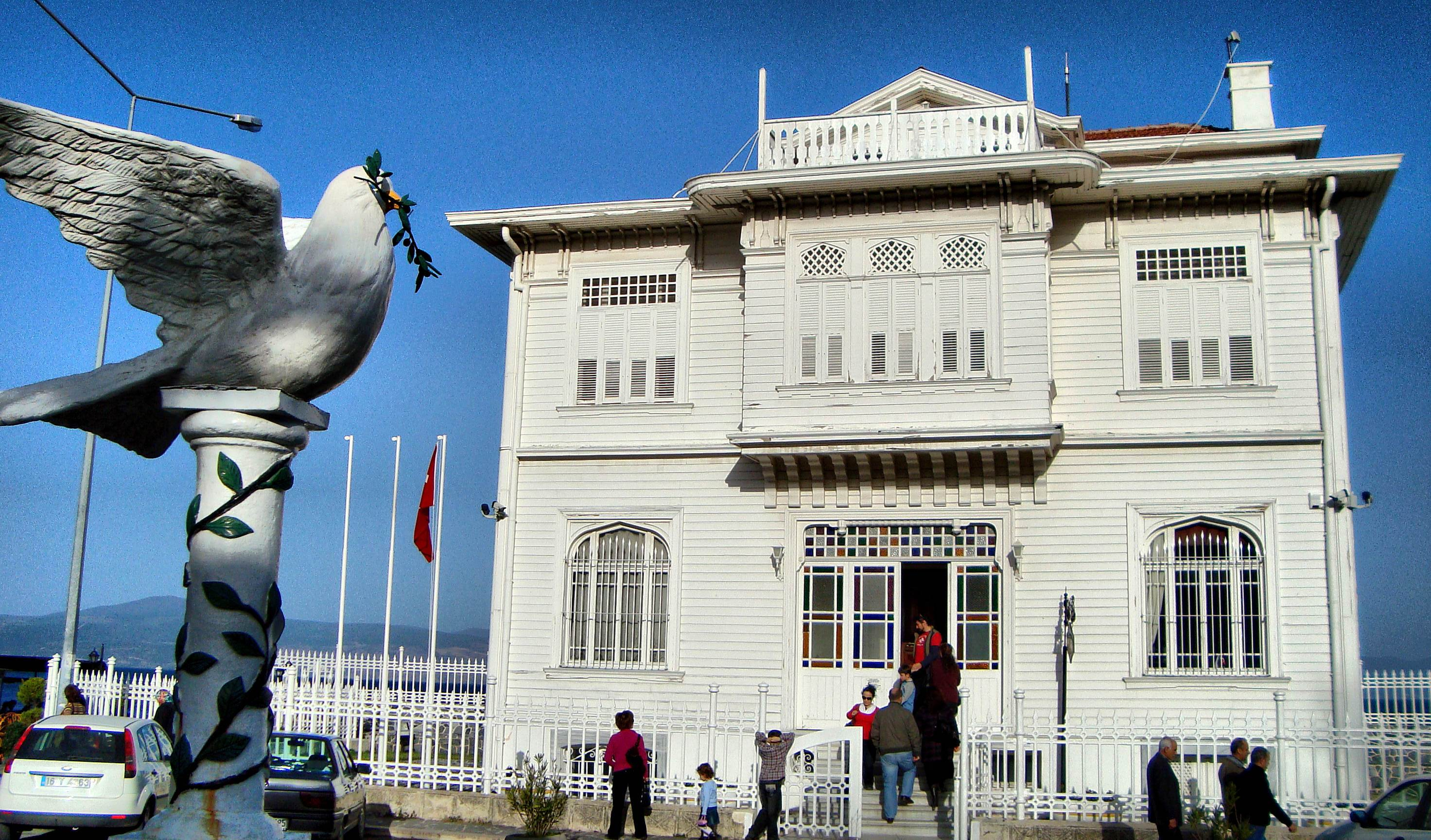
- Mudanya Armistice House, where the Armistice of Mudanya was signed
- Type: Armistice
- Signed: 11 October 1922
- Location: Mudanya, Bursa, Turkey
- Condition: Ratification
- Signatories: Grand National Assembly of Turkey; United Kingdom; France; Italy; Greece (posteriorly)
- Languages: Turkish, English

The Armistice of Mudanya (Turkish: Mudanya Mütarekesi) was an agreement between Turkey (the Grand National Assembly of Turkey) and Italy, France, and Britain, signed in the town of Mudanya, in the province of Bursa, on 11 October 1922. The Kingdom of Greece acceded to the armistice on 14 October 1922.

== Context ==
Under the Armistice of Mudros, ending World War I in the Ottoman Empire, the Allied powers were allowed to occupy the forts of the Straits in the Dardanelles and Bosphorus. Subsequently, they also occupied Constantinople and decided to partition the Ottoman Empire. Turkish nationalists resisted this in the form of the Grand National Assembly. Having achieved victories over occupying powers in Anatolia, Turkish forces were advancing on the neutral zone of the Straits.

On 5 September 1922, Mustafa Kemal Pasha asserted the Turkish claim to East Thrace (Trakya). On 15 September, the British cabinet decided that British forces should maintain their position and issued an ultimatum.

On 19 September, Britain decided to deny Constantinople and Thrace to the Turkish nationalists, but France, Yugoslavia, Italy and the British dominions objected to another war. French Prime Minister Raymond Poincaré tried to persuade the Turks to respect the neutral zone. The Allies asked for a peace conference on 23 September, to which Mustafa Kemal agreed on 29 September, nominating Mudanya as the venue. Meanwhile, the British cabinet decided to abandon East Thrace to the Turks.

Talks were convened on 3 October and led to the Armistice of Mudanya being signed on 11 October. The Greeks acceded to the terms on 13 October.

== Terms ==
- Greek troops were to withdraw from Eastern Thrace as far as the Maritsa River (River Meriç) and Adrianople (Edirne) within 15 days.
- Civil power would become Turkish 30 days after Greek troops left.
- No more than 8,000 Turkish gendarmes were to be in East Thrace until a peace treaty was completed.

The final settlement between the parties was worked out at the Conference of Lausanne from 21 November 1922 to 24 February 1923 and from 23 April to 24 July 1923, leading to the Treaty of Lausanne.

Allied troops continued to occupy the neutral zone until they withdrew under the terms of the treaty.

== See also ==
- Turkish War of Independence
- Greco-Turkish War (1919–1922)

== Sources ==
- International Treaties of the Twentieth Century, London: Routledge, ISBN 0-415-14125-7.
- Atatürk by Andrew Mango (ISBN 0-7195-6592-8).
