= Mürsel, Mudanya =

Village in Turkey

Mürsel
- Neighbourhood
- Location in Turkey Mürsel (Marmara)
- Coordinates: 40°18′22″N 28°53′46″E
- Country: Turkey
- Province: Bursa
- District: Mudanya
- Population (2022): 2,131
- Time zone: UTC+3 (TRT)

Mürsel (also: Mürselköy) is a neighbourhood in the municipality and district of Mudanya, Bursa Province in Turkey. Its population is 2,131 (2022).
