= Emirleryenicesi, Mudanya =

Village in Turkey

Emirleryenicesi
- Neighbourhood
- Location in Turkey Emirleryenicesi (Marmara)
- Coordinates: 40°19′N 28°37′E
- Country: Turkey
- Province: Bursa
- District: Mudanya
- Population (2022): 106
- Time zone: UTC+3 (TRT)

Emirleryenicesi is a neighbourhood in the municipality and district of Mudanya, Bursa Province in Turkey. Its population is 106 (2022).
