= Esence, Mudanya =

Village in Turkey

Esence
- Neighbourhood
- Location in Turkey Esence (Marmara)
- Coordinates: 40°20′49″N 28°41′17″E
- Country: Turkey
- Province: Bursa
- District: Mudanya
- Population (2022): 1,046
- Time zone: UTC+3 (TRT)

Esence is a neighbourhood in the municipality and district of Mudanya, Bursa Province in Turkey. Its population is 1,046 (2022).
