= Hançerli, Mudanya =

Village in Turkey

Hançerli
- Neighbourhood
- Country: Turkey
- Province: Bursa
- District: Mudanya
- Population (2022): 342
- Time zone: UTC+3 (TRT)

Hançerli is a neighbourhood in the municipality and district of Mudanya, Bursa Province in Turkey. Its population is 342 (2022).
