= Dedeköy, Mudanya =

Village in Turkey

Dedeköy
- Neighbourhood
- Location in Turkey Dedeköy (Marmara)
- Coordinates: 40°17′41″N 28°50′56″E
- Country: Turkey
- Province: Bursa
- District: Mudanya
- Population (2022): 474
- Time zone: UTC+3 (TRT)

Dedeköy is a neighbourhood in the municipality and district of Mudanya, Bursa Province in Turkey. Its population is 474 (2022).
