= Yaylacık, Mudanya =

Village in Turkey

Yaylacık
- Neighbourhood
- Location in Turkey Yaylacık (Marmara)
- Coordinates: 40°18′14″N 28°48′50″E
- Country: Turkey
- Province: Bursa
- District: Mudanya
- Population (2022): 126
- Time zone: UTC+3 (TRT)

Yaylacık is a neighbourhood in the municipality and district of Mudanya, Bursa Province in Turkey. Its population is 126 (2022).
