= Evciler, Mudanya =

Village in Turkey

Evciler
- Neighbourhood
- Country: Turkey
- Province: Bursa
- District: Mudanya
- Population (2022): 211
- Time zone: UTC+3 (TRT)

Evciler is a neighbourhood in the municipality and district of Mudanya, Bursa Province in Turkey. Its population is 211 (2022).
