= Akköy, Mudanya =

Village in Turkey

Akköy
- Neighbourhood
- Location in Turkey Akköy (Marmara)
- Coordinates: 40.3267°N 28.8436°E
- Country: Turkey
- Province: Bursa
- District: Mudanya
- Population (2022): 453
- Time zone: UTC+3 (TRT)

Akköy is a neighbourhood in the municipality and district of Mudanya, Bursa Province in Turkey. Its population is 453 (2022).
