= İpekyayla, Mudanya =

Village in Turkey

İpekyayla
- Neighbourhood
- Location in Turkey İpekyayla (Marmara)
- Coordinates: 40°19′58″N 28°49′21″E
- Country: Turkey
- Province: Bursa
- District: Mudanya
- Population (2022): 348
- Time zone: UTC+3 (TRT)

İpekyayla is a neighbourhood in the municipality and district of Mudanya, Bursa Province in Turkey. Its population is 348 (2022).
