= Aydınpınar, Mudanya =

Village in Turkey

Aydınpınar
- Neighbourhood
- Location in Turkey Aydınpınar (Marmara)
- Coordinates: 40.3312°N 28.9147°E
- Country: Turkey
- Province: Bursa
- District: Mudanya
- Population (2022): 1,013
- Time zone: UTC+3 (TRT)

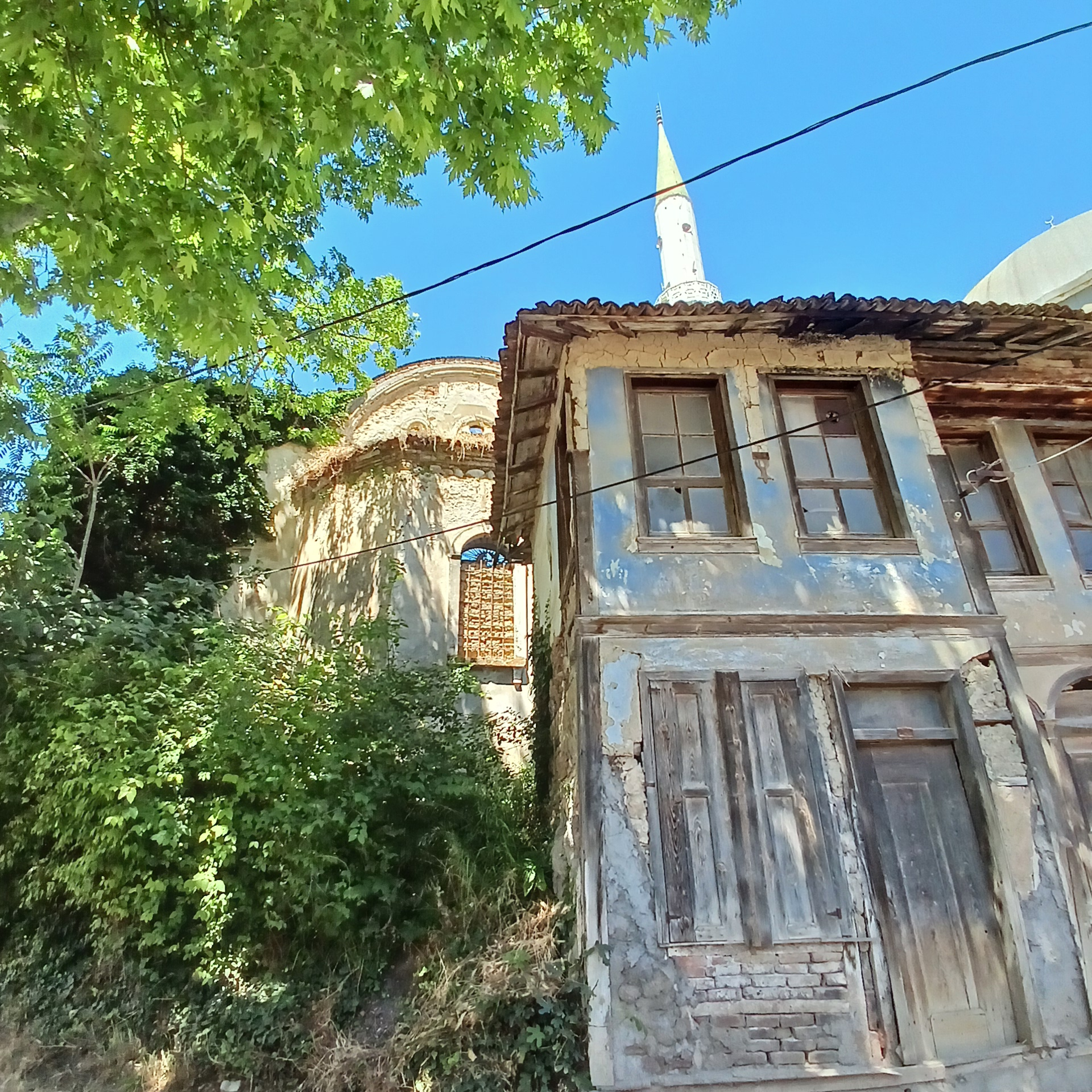
Aydınpınar, Mudanya

Aydınpınar is a neighbourhood in the municipality and district of Mudanya, Bursa Province in Turkey. Its population is 1,013 (2022). In the Ottoman times it was called Mesebolu from the Greek Misopolis or Mesopolis. It's Greek Orthodox popularion left the settlement as a result of the population exchange between Greece and Turkey.
