= Yaşar Altıntaş =

Turkish footballer

Personal information
- Date of birth: 3 October 1957 (age 69)
- Place of birth: İzmit, Turkey
- Position: Forward

Senior career*
Years	Team	Apps	(Gls)
1980–1981	Sakaryaspor	1	(0)
1981–1985	Kocaelispor	90	(13)
1985–1990	MKE Ankaragücü	136	(14)
1990–1994	Kocaelispor	77	(33)
1994–1995	Kocaeli Petkimspor	18	(1)
Total		322	(61)
- * Club domestic league appearances and goals

Yaşar Altıntaş (born 10 March 1957) is a Turkish retired footballer who played as a forward. He appeared in the Süper Lig with MKE Ankaragücü and Kocaelispor.

== Personal life ==
Yaşar's father Mustafa Altıntaş, his brother Yusuf Altıntaş, and his nephew Batuhan Altıntaş all have played professional football in the Turkish Süper Lig.
