= Mustafa Altıntaş =

Turkish footballer

Personal information
- Full name: Mustafa Altıntaş
- Date of birth: January 1, 1939
- Place of birth: Kartepe, Turkey
- Date of death: 10 November 2010 (aged 71)
- Height: 1.70 m (5 ft 7 in)
- Position: Forward

Senior career*
Years	Team	Apps	(Gls)
1964–1968	Bursaspor	41	(21)
1969–1974	Kocaelispor	117	(8)
- * Club domestic league appearances and goals

Mustafa Altıntaş (1 January 1939 – 10 November 2010), otherwise known as Mustafa Köylü, was a Turkish footballer who played for Bursaspor and Kocaelispor.

== Death ==
Mustafa died of cancer in Kartepe, Turkey on 10 November 2010.

== Personal life ==
Mustafa's sons Yusuf Altıntaş and Yaşar Altıntaş, and his grandson Batuhan Altıntaş all have played professional football in the Turkish Süper Lig.
