= Yusuf Altıntaş =

Turkish footballer and coach

Personal information
- Full name: Yusuf Altıntaş
- Date of birth: 7 August 1961 (age 65)
- Place of birth: Kartepe, Turkey
- Position: Centre-back

Senior career*
Years	Team	Apps	(Gls)
1980–1984	Kocaelispor	106	(6)
1984–1994	Galatasaray	211	(19)
1994–1995	Kocaelispor	8	(0)

International career^{‡}
1980	Turkey U18	3	(0)
1981–1982	Turkey U21	6	(0)
1983–1991	Turkey	29	(2)

Managerial career
- 2005–2006: Kocaelispor (assistant)
- 2007: Kayseri Erciyesspor (assistant)
- 2997: Bursaspor (assistant)
- * Club domestic league appearances and goals as of 9 December 2017 ‡ National team caps and goals as of 9 December 2017

Yusuf Altıntaş (born 7 August 1961), otherwise known as Rambo Yusuf, is a Turkish former football player and coach.

== Professional career ==
Altıntaş began his career with Köseköy Belediyespor, and moved to Kocaelispor in 1982. He transferred to Galatasaray in 1984 where he won the Turkish First division in 1987, 1988, 1993 and 1994. He also won the Turkish Cup twice in 1985 and 1992. He finished his playing career by returning to Kocaelispor in 1994, and played one season with the club.

Altıntaş was part of the Galatasaray squad that reached the semi-final of the 1988–89 European Cup.

== International career ==
Altıntaş played for Turkey between 1984 and 1992 winning 29 caps and scoring two goals.

== Managerial career ==
Altıntaş retired in 1994 at the age of 34. Following his retirement, he worked as coach or assistant manager, most currently with Bursaspor (as assistant manager of Bülent Korkmaz).

== Personal life ==
Yusuf's father Mustafa Altıntaş, his brother Yaşar Altıntaş, and his son Batuhan Altıntaş all have played professional football in the Turkish Süper Lig.

== Honours ==
Galatasaray

- Süper Lig: 1986–1987, 1987–1988, 1992–1993, 1993–1994
- Turkish Cup: 1984–1985, 1990–1991, 1992–1993
- Turkish Super Cup: 1986–1987, 1987–1988, 1987–1988, 1990–1991
- Chancellor Cup: 1985–1986
- TSYD Cup: 1991–1992, 1992–1993
