= Altıntaş, Mudanya =

Village in Turkey

Altıntaş
- Neighbourhood
- Location in Turkey Altıntaş (Marmara)
- Coordinates: 40.3662°N 28.9008°E
- Country: Turkey
- Province: Bursa
- District: Mudanya
- Population (2022): 546
- Time zone: UTC+3 (TRT)

Altıntaş is a neighbourhood in the municipality and district of Mudanya, Bursa Province in Turkey. Its population is 546 (2022).
