= Batuhan Altıntaş (footballer) =

Turkish footballer

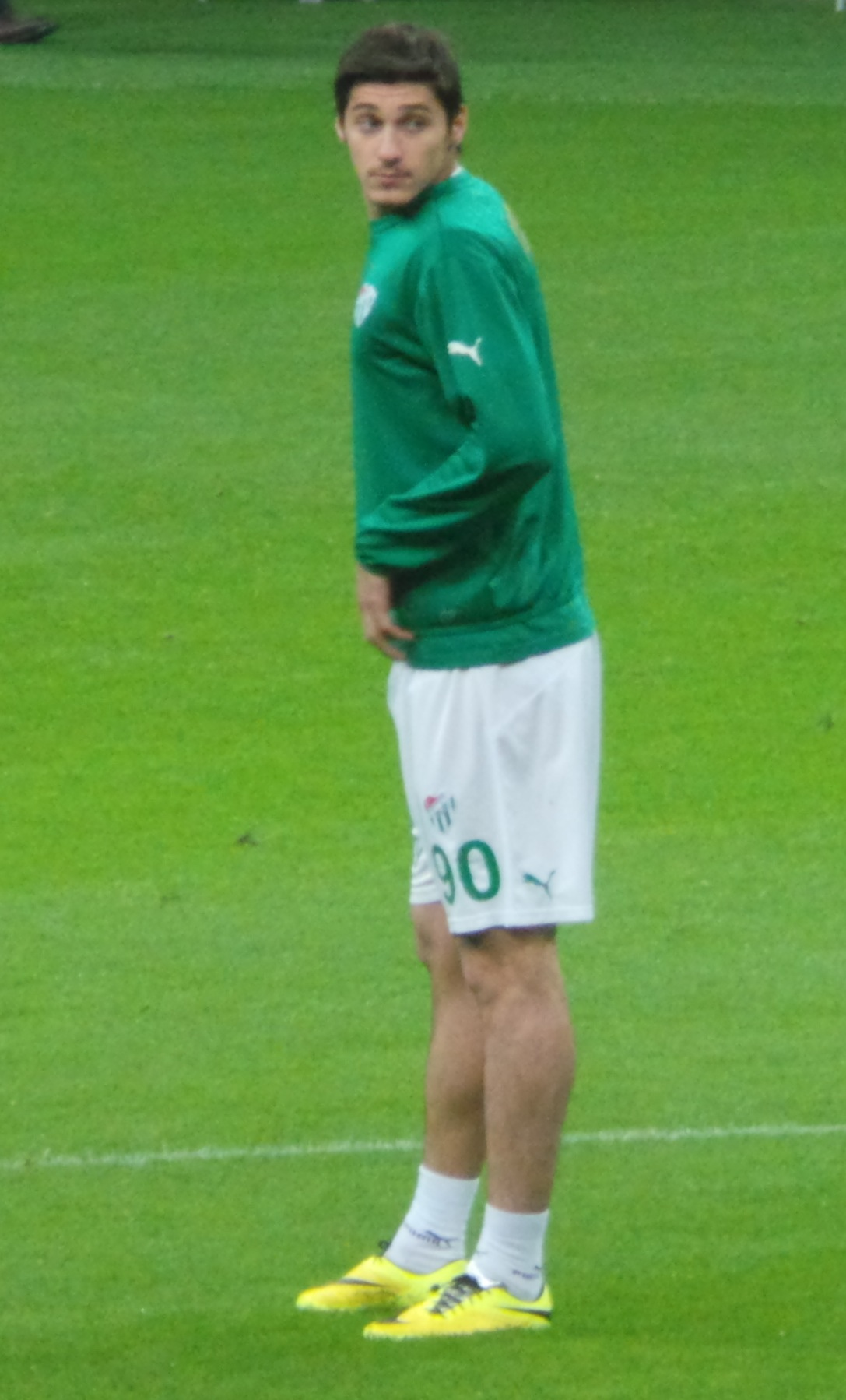

Personal information
- Full name: Mustafa Batuhan Altıntaş
- Date of birth: 14 March 1996 (age 30)
- Place of birth: İzmit, Turkey
- Height: 1.90 m (6 ft 3 in)
- Position: Forward

Team information
- Current team: Güzide Gebzespor
- Number: 99

Youth career
- 2008–2009: Kocaeli Günesspor
- 2009–2013: Bursaspor

Senior career*
Years	Team	Apps	(Gls)
2012–2015	Bursaspor	9	(0)
2015–2018	Hamburger SV	1	(0)
2016–2017	→ Kasımpaşa (loan)	15	(2)
2017	→ Yeni Malatyaspor (loan)	4	(1)
2018	→ Giresunspor (loan)	8	(0)
2018–2019	Boluspor	28	(2)
2020–2021	Ankaraspor	8	(0)
2021–2022	1922 Konyaspor	24	(3)
2022–2023	24 Erzincanspor	30	(9)
2023–2024	İnegölspor	13	(2)
2024–	Güzide Gebzespor	65	(37)

International career^{‡}
2010	Turkey U15	2	(0)
2011–2012	Turkey U16	10	(5)
2012–2013	Turkey U17	12	(4)
2013–2014	Turkey U18	12	(6)
2013–2015	Turkey U19	12	(5)
2015	Turkey U20	2	(0)
2016–2018	Turkey U21	4	(0)
- * Club domestic league appearances and goals as of 1 October 2026 ‡ National team caps and goals as of 27 March 2018

Mustafa Batuhan Altıntaş (born 14 March 1996) is a Turkish footballer who plays as a forward for TFF 2. Lig club Güzide Gebzespor.

== Professional career ==
On 4 July 2015 it was announced on the official Hamburger SV website that Altıntaş signed a contract that will keep him at the club till 2017.

On 8 August 2018, he signed a 2 year deal with Boluspor.

== Personal life ==
Batuhan's grandfather Mustafa Altıntaş, his father Yusuf Altıntaş, and his uncle Yaşar Altıntaş all played professional football in the Turkish Süper Lig.
