= Kumyaka, Mudanya =

Village in Turkey

Kumyaka
- Neighbourhood
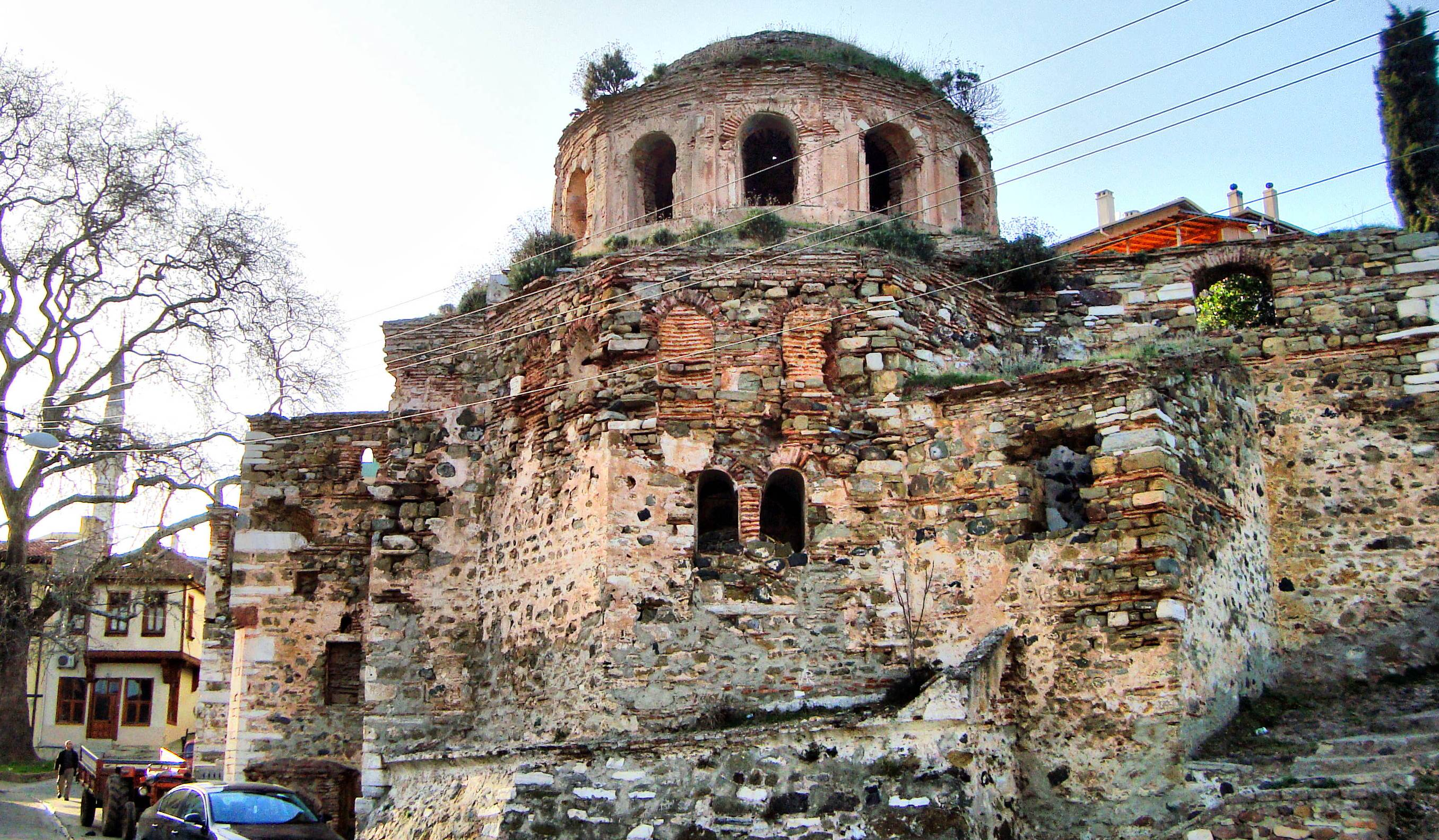
- Başmelekler kilisesi

- Location within Turkey Location within Marmara
- Coordinates: 40°23′03″N 28°49′36″E
- Country: Turkey
- Province: Bursa
- District: Mudanya
- Population (2022): 661
- Time zone: UTC+3 (TRT)

Kumyaka is a neighbourhood in the municipality and district of Mudanya, Bursa Province in Turkey. Its population is 661 (2022).
