= Mudanya =

- District and municipality
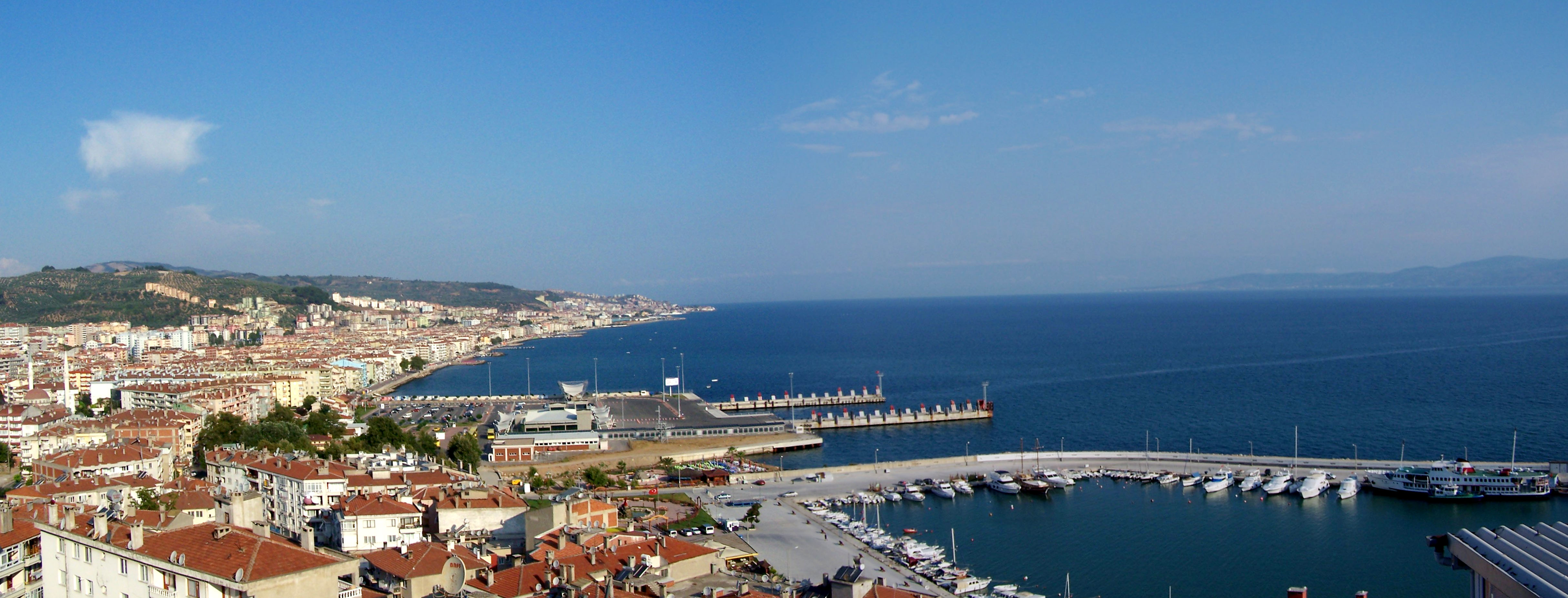
- View of Güzelyalı and Mudanya

- Logo

- Map showing Mudanya District in Bursa Province

- Location within Turkey Location within Marmara
- Coordinates: 40°22′35″N 28°53′00″E
- Country: Turkey
- Province: Bursa

Government
  - Mayor: Deniz Dalgıç (CHP)
- Area: 369 km^{2} (142 sq mi)
- Population (2022): 108,011
  - Density: 293/km^{2} (758/sq mi)
- Time zone: UTC+3 (TRT)
- Postal code: 16940
- Area code: 0224
- Website: www.mudanya.bel.tr

Mudanya (also: Mudania; Greek: τα Μουδανιά, ta Moudaniá; the site of ancient Apamea Myrlea) is a municipality and district of Bursa Province, Turkey. Its area is 369 km^{2}, and its population is 108,011 (2022). It is located on the Gulf of Gemlik, part of the southern coast of the Sea of Marmara. Between 1875 and 1948, it was connected with Bursa by the Mudanya–Bursa railway. Mudanya has only an open anchorage usable in calm weather. The town produces olive oil and there is a pier used by local fishing and cargo boats.

== History ==
According to the Ottoman General Census of 1881/82-1893, the kaza of Mudanya of Hüdavendigâr vilayet had a total population of 16,683, consisting of 11,792 Greeks and 4,891 Muslims. A port city, it also had a railway connection to Bursa which was completed in 1875. The railway had a pier at the seaport of Mudanya for exporting. Istanbul was often the recipient of exported goods from Mudanya. Silk was a popular export. During the Turkish War of Independence, Mudanya was bombarded by the Royal Navy and thus partially burned by the British Fleet during the Greek Summer Offensive of 1920. Sergeant Şükrü from Mudanya and 9 of his brothers-in-arms were killed during the Allied bombardment and subsequent landing by the Greek troops and the British Royal Marines.

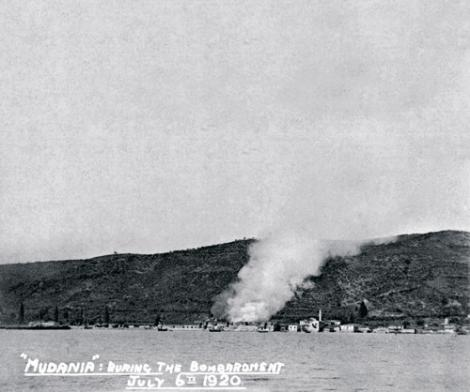
Mudanya being bombarded and thus burned by the British Warships on July 6th, 1920.

=== Liberation of Mudanya ===
Mudanya and its environs were liberated by the Turkish Kocaeli Army Corps under the Command of Halit (Karsıalan) Paşa on the 12th of September 1922. The Greek 11th Infantry Division (Manisa Division) and the 45th &17th Infantry regiments along with their commanders and with Major-General Nikolaos Kladas were captured.

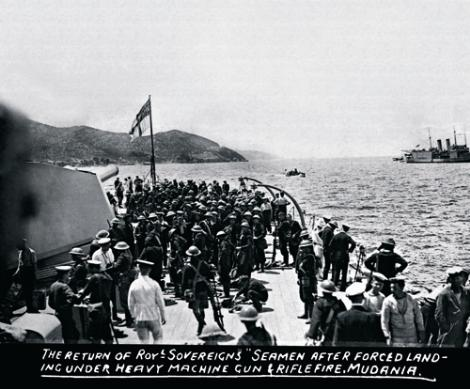
The return of HMS Royal Sovereign's seaman after forced landing under heavy machine gun & rifle fire. (Mudanya, July 1920)

The town was the signing place of the Armistice of Mudanya between Turkey, Italy, France and Britain on October 11, 1922, following the Turkish War of Independence.

After the Treaty of Lausanne and the Greco-Turkish population exchange agreement, the Greeks of the town were transferred into mainland Greece, establishing a settlement to which they gave the name of their previous town, Nea Moudania (New Moudania, located on the Chalkidiki peninsula, in the Macedonia region of Greece). In return, a number of Cretan Turks were settled in Mudanya.

== Composition ==
There are 47 neighbourhoods in Mudanya District:

- Akköy
- Altıntaş
- Aydınpınar
- Bademli
- Balabancık
- Çağrışan
- Çamlık
- Çayönü
- Çekrice
- Çepni
- Çınarlı
- Dedeköy
- Dereköy
- Eğerce
- Emirleryenicesi
- Esence
- Evciler
- Göynüklü
- Güzelyalı Burgaz
- Güzelyalı Eğitim
- Güzelyalı Siteler
- Güzelyalı Yalı
- Halitpaşa
- Hançerli
- Hasanbey
- Hasköy
- İpekyayla
- Işıklı
- Kaymakoba
- Küçükyenice
- Kumyaka
- Mesudiye
- Mirzaoba
- Mürsel
- Mütareke
- Ömerbey
- Orhaniye
- Söğütpınar
- Şükrüçavuş
- Tirilye
- Ülkü
- Yalıçiftlik
- Yaman
- Yaylacık
- Yenimahalle
- Yörükali
- Yörükyenicesi

== Traditional architecture in Mudanya ==
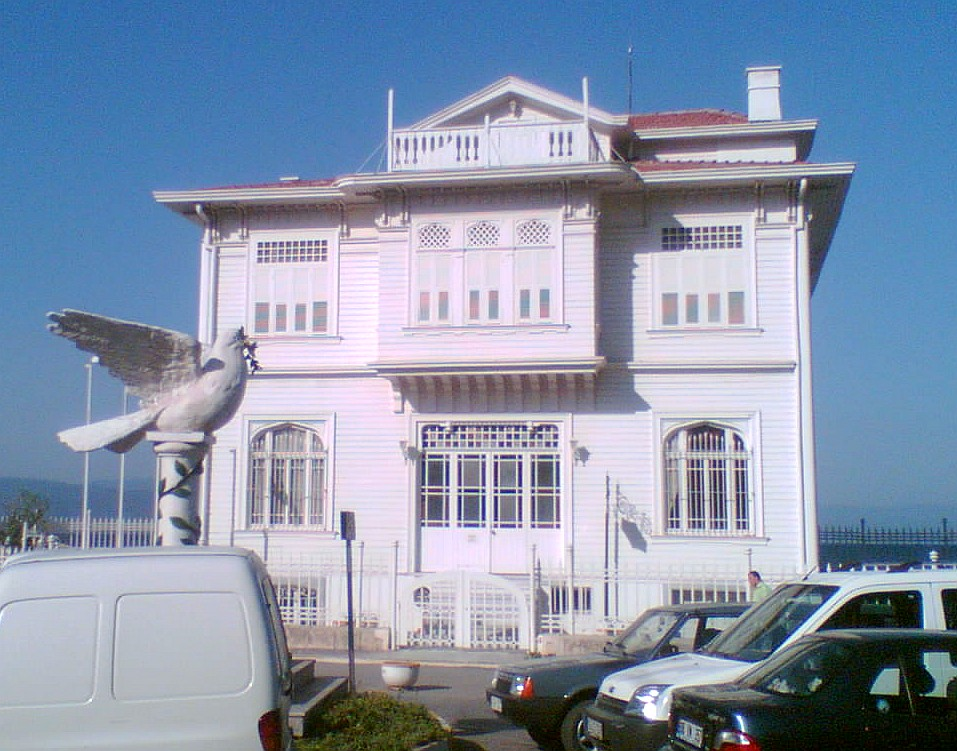
The Armistice of Mudanya was signed in this Ottoman era building

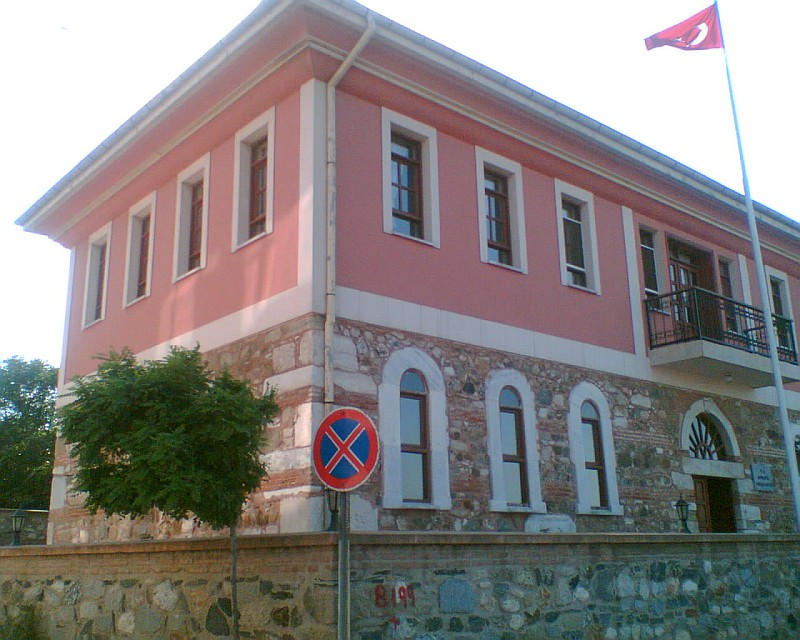
Ottoman era Governor's House in Mudanya

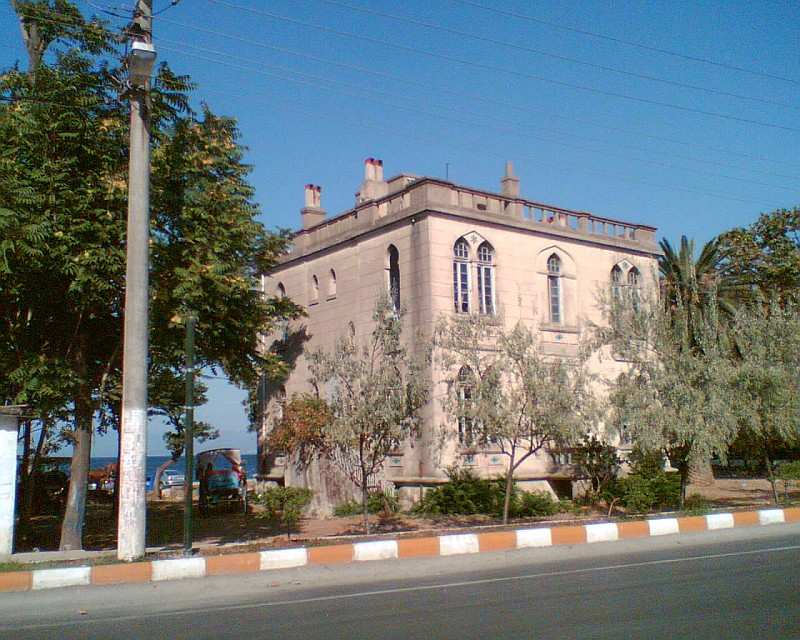
Ottoman era traditional building in Mudanya

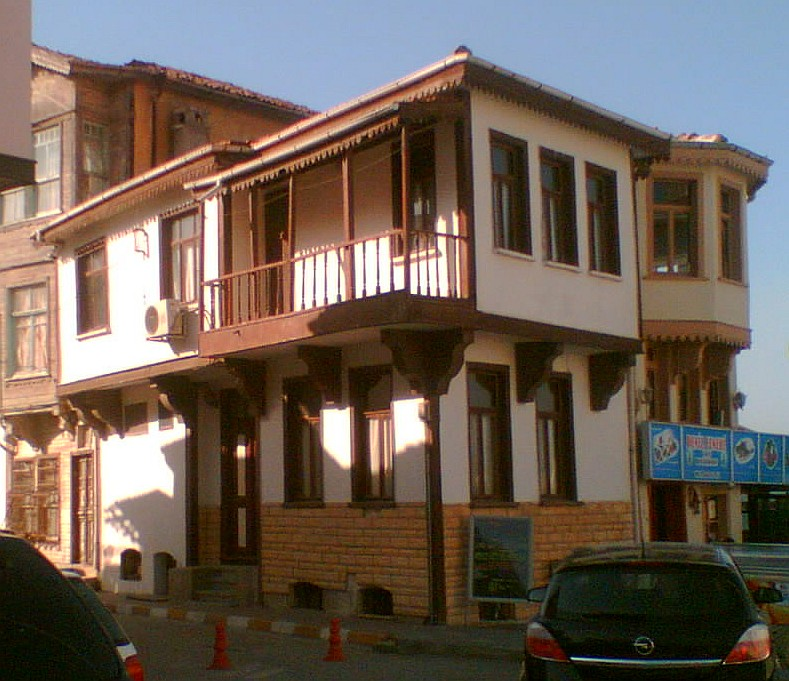
Ottoman era traditional house in Mudanya

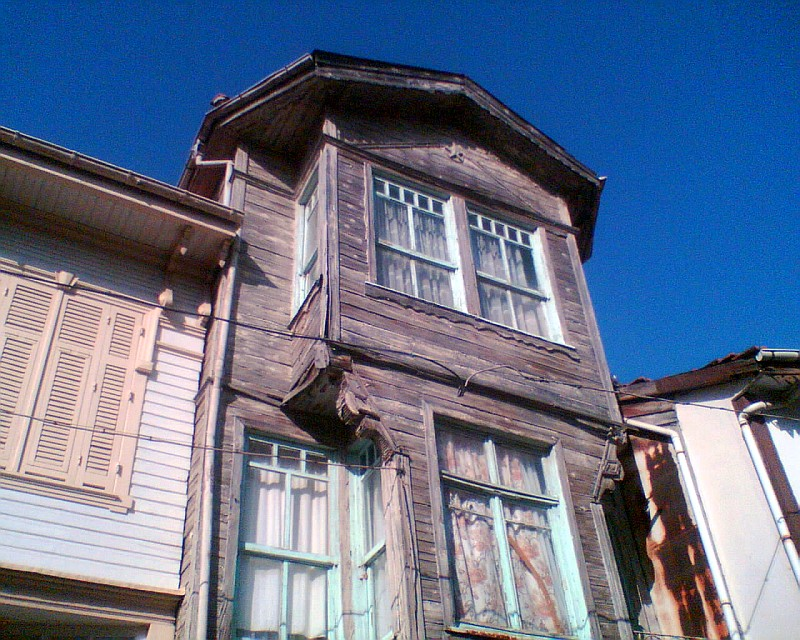
Ottoman era traditional house in Mudanya

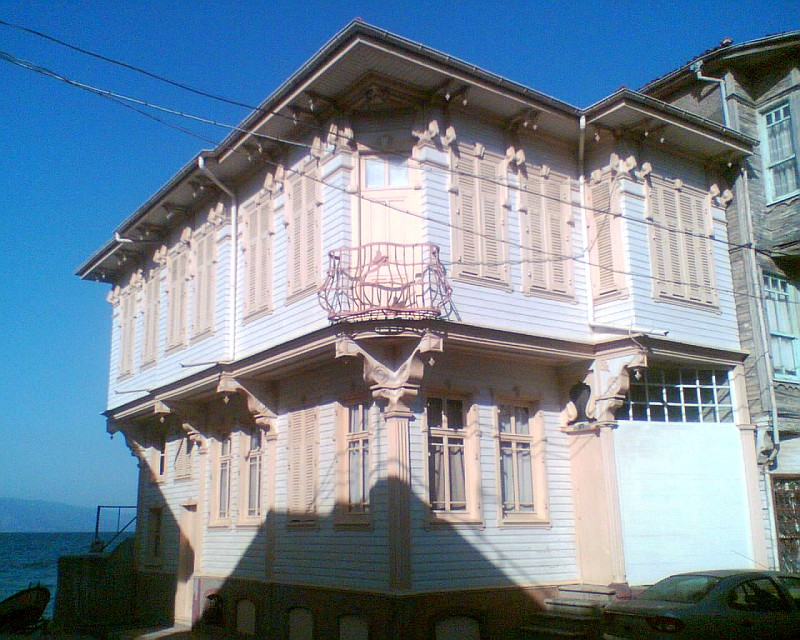
Ottoman era traditional house in Mudanya

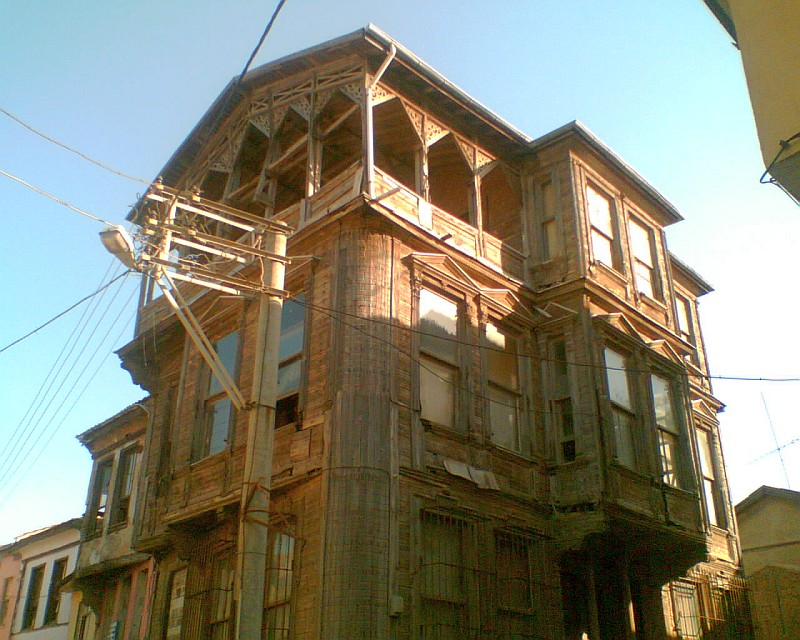
Ottoman era traditional house in Mudanya

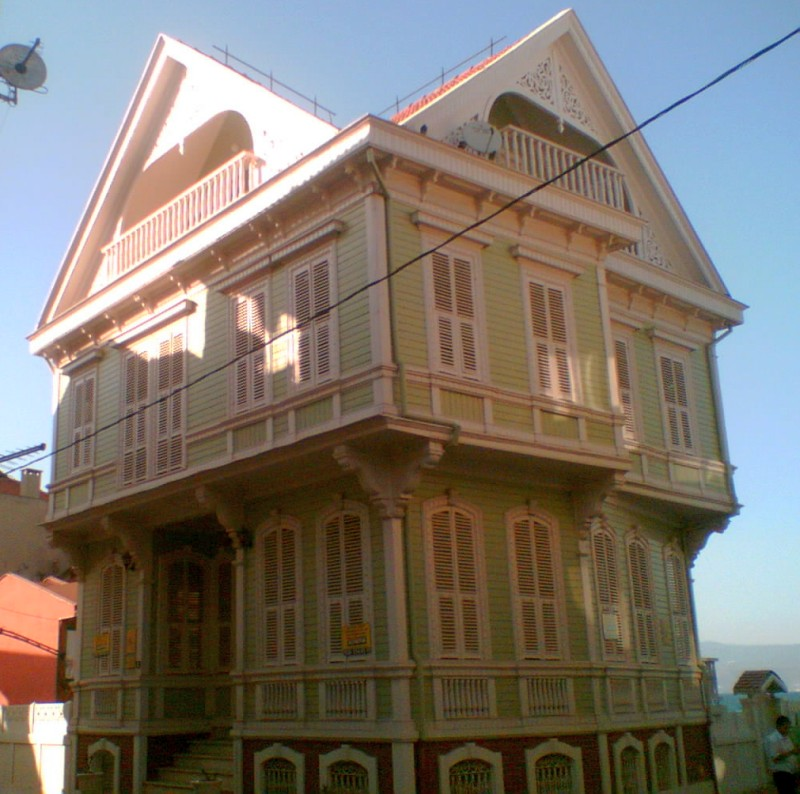
Ottoman era traditional house in Mudanya

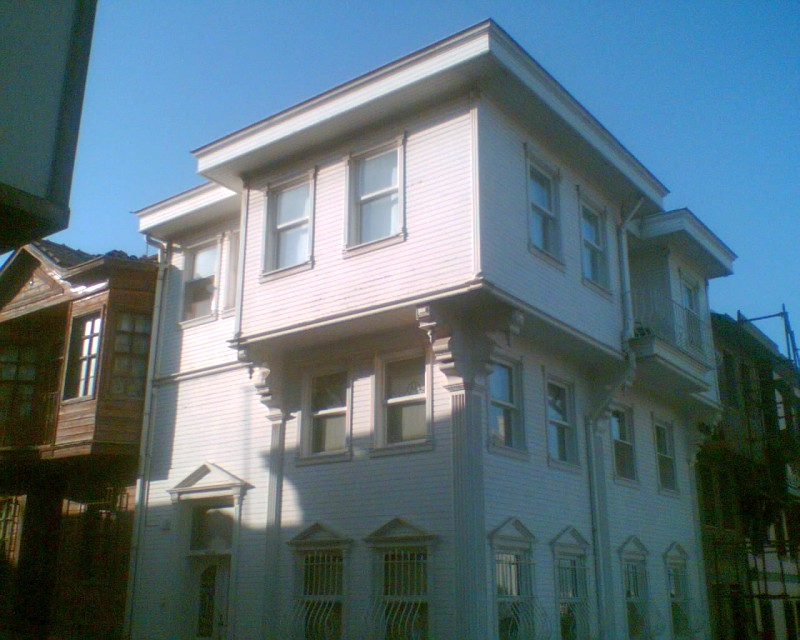
Ottoman era traditional houses in Mudanya

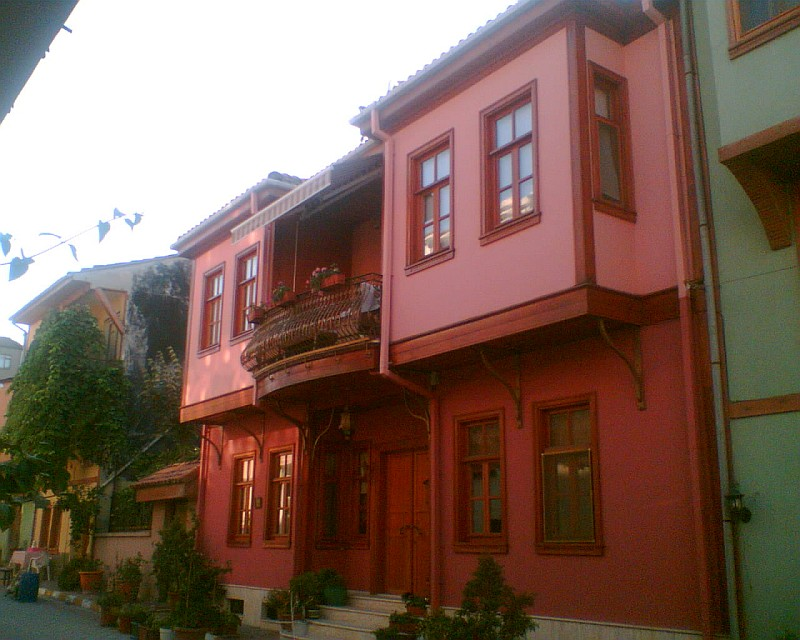
Ottoman era traditional houses in Mudanya

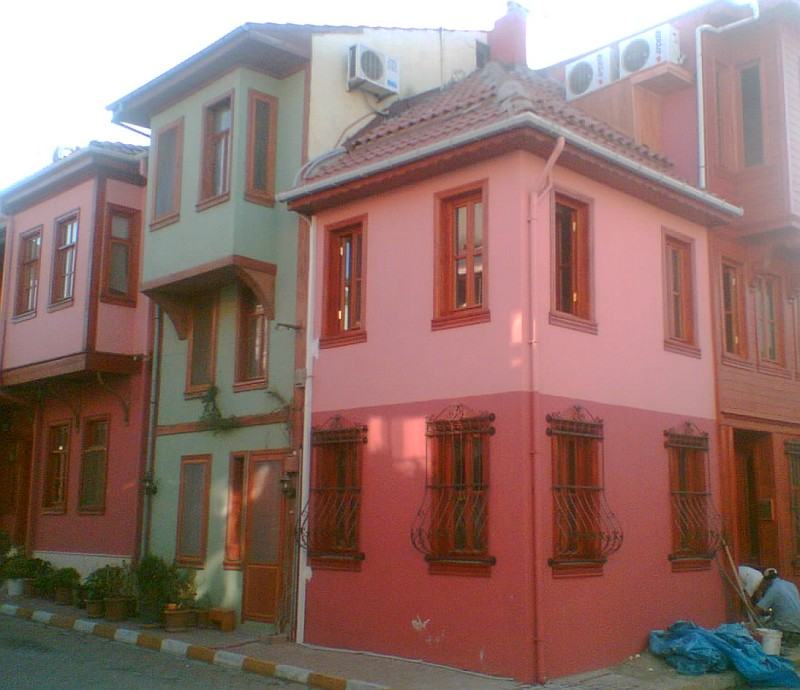
Ottoman era traditional houses in Mudanya

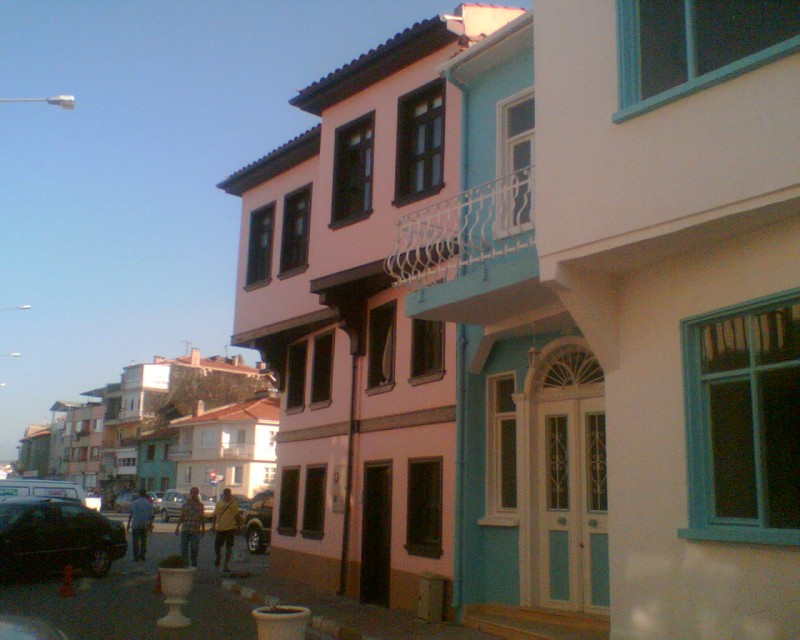
Ottoman era traditional houses in Mudanya

== See also ==
- Nea Moudania
