= Alterazioni Video =

Artist collective

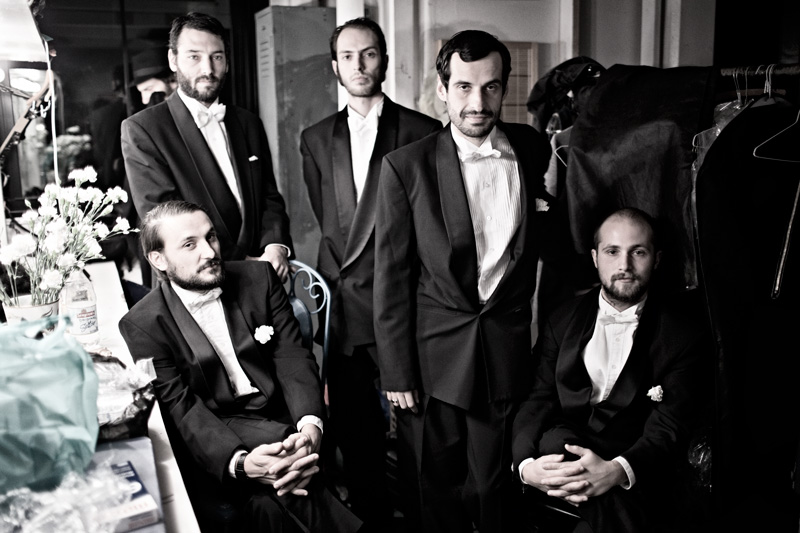
- Alterazioni Video at Performance Space 122, November 2, New York, 2009
- Movement: Incompiuto Siciliano

Alterazioni Video is an artist collective founded in 2004 in Milan, Italy and based in Berlin and New York City. The members are Paololuca Barbieri Marchi, Alberto Caffarelli, Matteo Erenbourg, Andrea Masu and Giacomo Porfiri.

Since 2004, Alterazioni Video has participated in international exhibitions such as Disobedience (Künstlerhaus Bethanien, Berlin 2005), 52nd International Art Exhibition (Venice Biennale, 2007), Remote Control (MoCA, Shanghai 2007), Manifesta (Rovereto 2008) and Freak Out (Greene Naftali Gallery, New York 2013). They have also had solo shows in institutions such as the Chelsea Art Museum (New York, 2006), MAR Museum of Art Ravenna (Ravenna, 2010) and Viafarini (Milan, 2012).

In 2007, for the 52nd Venice Biennale, in the main exhibition curated by Robert Storr, the group showed Painting (16:9 colour HD, 16'33", 2007), a work that documents the continued stratification of writings and cancellations on the outer walls of the San Vittore prison in Milan. Writings, images, and attempts at censorship become the linguistic elements of a single large "painting" that documents, in its progress, the life of a community.

In 2009, the group was invited to take part in the Biennial of performing art Performa 09 NY, together with the Icelandic artist Ragnar Kjartansson with a performance titled Symphony n°1.

In 2015, Alterazioni Video and Ragnar Kjartansson presented Symphony n°2, premiering at HAU Hebbel am Ufer in Berlin as part of the accompanying programme to the exhibition Dieter Roth und die Musik, curated by Gabriele Knapstein at Hamburger Bahnhof — Museum für Gegenwart, Berlin. The performance follows the four-movement structure of a classical symphony; members of Alterazioni Video perform with props on stage while Kjartansson appears in four video inserts that determine the length of each movement. The performance documentation was subsequently exhibited at Hamburger Bahnhof.

== Incompiuto Siciliano ==
Alterazioni Video is known for creating Incompiuto Siciliano, a term coined by the collective to describe a contemporary architectural phenomenon that produces instant ruins. Since 2006, the group has catalogued over 696 unfinished public infrastructures — bridges, motorways, hospitals, stadia, prisons, and theatres — scattered across Italy, reframing them as an architectural style representative of the country's recent history. Incompiuto Siciliano became a subject of academic study and received wide coverage in the Italian and international press.

In 2019, fashion designer Virgil Abloh drew on Incompiuto as the inspiration for the Off-White™ Pre-Fall 2019 Menswear collection. The collaboration expanded: Alterazioni Video created the advertising campaign and set design for the Off-White™ Autumn/Winter 2019 Men's show, held at the Louvre Museum in Paris on 16 January 2019. In response, Alterazioni Video invited Abloh to participate in a joint exhibition, Incompiuto: the birth of a style, at Campoli Presti gallery in Paris (January–March 2019). The project formulated Incompiuto as an autonomous aesthetic style traversing art, fashion, and architecture.

The same year, Kunst Meran Merano Arte hosted a solo exhibition, Incompiuto: the birth of a style (June–September 2019).

In 2021, Museo Nivola in Orani (Sardinia) presented Notes for an Unfinished Park, a new chapter of the Incompiuto research focused on repurposing unfinished public sites as cultural and community spaces, centred on a film shot inside an abandoned stadium.

== Turbo Film ==
From around 2011 onwards, Alterazioni Video developed the Turbo Film — a distinct cinematic genre defined by a contaminated and evolving filmic language, designed to circulate freely across art spaces, film festivals, and online platforms. Drawing on experimental cinema, found footage, remix culture, and internet vernacular, the Turbo Films combine pop music, kitsch imagery, underground culture, and documentary material into feature-length works shot across multiple countries. The group published a Turbo Film Manifesto articulating the genre's anti-hierarchical, improvisational approach.

Over the course of more than a decade the collective produced eleven Turbo Films, screened at venues including the Cairo International Film Festival, Performa New York, the Milano Film Festival, Art Basel Miami Beach, and the Rencontres Internationales Paris/Berlin (Berlin, 2024). The film Per Troppo Amore received the jury prize at Schermo dell'Arte in Florence.

In February–March 2016, Fondazione Cineteca Italiana, in collaboration with Dispari&Dispari Gallery, organised a retrospective, TURBO FILM, at Spazio Oberdan in Milan — the collective's first major institutional film survey. On the occasion, Fausto Lupetti Editore published a book, Turbo Film, with texts by Marc Augé, Domenico Quaranta, Marco Scotini, Davide Giannella, and others.

In June 2020, Alterazioni Video produced I Numeri Non Vengono Chiamati in Ordine Numerico for Triennale Estate (Milan), a Turbo Film directed simultaneously from Milan, New York, Berlin, Faro, and Palermo via remote collaboration with NO TEXT Azienda during the COVID-19 lockdown, curated by Davide Giannella and Matteo Balduzzi.

In 2025, the collective completed Rotten Sharks, a Turbo Film produced with AI-assisted image generation, in which the writer and performer Filippo Anniballi (Phil Sick) — a long-time collaborator who died prematurely — is reinserted as a protagonist in a posthumous fiction set at sea. The film was presented alongside the series Dead Writers Smell Like Forgotten Piss (2025) in the group exhibition Spettri Digitali at Museo Madre, Naples (May–July 2025), curated by Sara Dolfi Agostini and produced by the Fondazione Paul Thorel on the occasion of the Prize's second edition.

== The New Circus Event (2019) ==
In May 2019, Alterazioni Video produced The New Circus Event (also known as Waiting for the Tsunami) for the V-A-C Foundation, as the opening event of the foundation's Time, Forward! programme at Palazzo delle Zattere, Venice (8–10 May 2019). Commissioned by V-A-C and conceived as a free three-day public event on the canalside, the project took as its starting point the 100th anniversary of the Soviet state circus — in August 1919, Lenin signed the decree nationalising all circuses, ending a centuries-old tradition of nomadic, anarchic popular spectacle. In deliberate contrast to that act of institutional standardisation, Alterazioni Video cast their performers the way early circus did: by searching for individuals with rare and singular skills. The casting was conducted entirely online, scouring the internet for characters with extraordinary and unrepeatable abilities. The resulting international cast included Guinness world record holders, acrobats, dancers, comedians, yoga masters and mathematicians, creating a circus of abundance that set the internet hive mind's chaos against the endurance and theatricality of live performance. The curator and critic Francesco Bonami participated as a performer, painting portraits of tourists, guests and other performers throughout the entire three-day event.

== Selected exhibitions and screenings ==
- Disobedience, Künstlerhaus Bethanien, Berlin, 2005
- 52nd International Art Exhibition, Venice Biennale, curated by Robert Storr, 2007
- Remote Control, MoCA, Shanghai, 2007
- Manifesta 7, curated by Adam Budak, Rovereto, 2008
- Symphony n°1, Performa 09, curated by Barbara Casavecchia and Caroline Corbetta, New York, 2009
- All My Friends Are Dead, Fondazione Sandretto Re Rebaudengo, curated by Francesco Bonami, Turin, 2009
- Acapulco (CENSORED SHOW), MAR Museo dell'Arte di Ravenna, curated by Camilla Boemio, Ravenna, 2010
- MoMA PS1 Performance Dome, New York, 2012
- Kadist Art Foundation, Paris, 2012
- Freak Out, Greene Naftali Gallery, New York, 2013
- PAC Padiglione d'Arte Contemporanea, Milan, 2014
- Symphony n°2 (with Ragnar Kjartansson), premiere at HAU Hebbel am Ufer; Dieter Roth und die Musik, curated by Gabriele Knapstein, Hamburger Bahnhof, Berlin, 2015
- TURBO FILM retrospective, Spazio Oberdan / Fondazione Cineteca Italiana, Milan, 2016
- Quadrennial Exhibition, Rome, 2016
- Manifesta 12, Palermo, 2018
- Incompiuto: the birth of a style (with Virgil Abloh), Campoli Presti, Paris, 2019
- Incompiuto: the birth of a style, Kunst Meran Merano Arte, Merano, 2019
- The New Circus Event, V-A-C Foundation, Venice (58th Venice Biennale), 2019
- Notes for an Unfinished Park, Museo Nivola, Orani, 2021
- MACRO Mattatoio, Rome, 2022
- Rencontres Internationales Paris/Berlin, Berlin, 2024
- Spettri Digitali (Premio Paul Thorel, 2nd edition), Museo Madre, Naples, 2025

== Selected works ==
- Painting (16:9 colour HD, 16'33", 2007)
- Artists' Serial Killer (16:9, colour, 12'24", 2008)
- COPY_RIGHT_NO_COPY_RIGHT, file-sharing platform, Manifesta 7, 2008
- Symphony n°1, Allegro ma non troppo un poco maestoso, Performa 09, New York, 2009
- Rosa Perfetto (6', 2010)
- All My Friends Are Dead (2010)
- Symphony n°2 (with Ragnar Kjartansson), HAU Hebbel am Ufer / Hamburger Bahnhof, Berlin, 2015
- Surfing with Satoshi, Puerto Rico, 2013
- Per Troppo Amore (jury prize, Schermo dell'Arte, Florence)
- Ambaradan, Omo Valley / Ethiopia, 2014
- OFF___WHITE #1 (2018)
- The New Circus Event, V-A-C Foundation, Venice, 2019
- I Numeri Non Vengono Chiamati in Ordine Numerico, Triennale Estate, Milan, 2020
- Notes for an Unfinished Park, Museo Nivola, Orani, 2021
- Rotten Sharks (AI-assisted Turbo Film, 24', 2025)
- Dead Writers Smell Like Forgotten Piss (series, 2025)
