= Francesco Bonami =

Italian art curator and writer

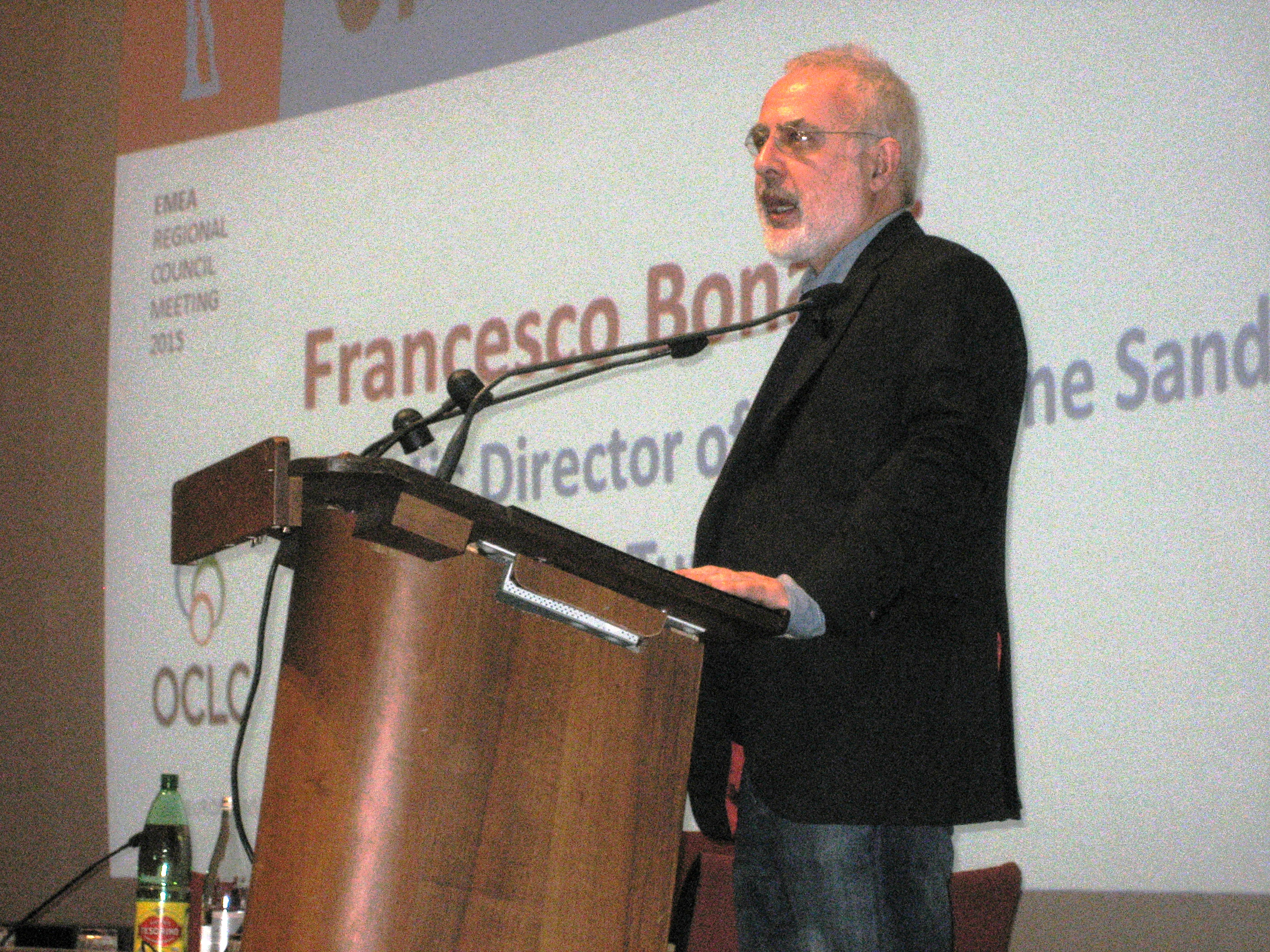
Francesco Bonami, Florence, 2015.

Francesco Bonami (b. Florence, 1955) is an Italian art curator and writer. He lives in Milan and Manhattan, New York.

== Life and career ==
Bonami was born in Florence. He studied Set and Theatre Design at the Accademia di Belle Arti di Firenze. After a brief spell as an artist in Milan, Bonami relocated to New York City in 1991 where he was appointed U.S. Editor of Flash Art magazine, a post he held until 1998. From 1999 to 2008 he was Manilow Senior Curator at the Museum of Contemporary Art, Chicago and Artistic Director of Fondazione Pitti Discovery in Florence and Fondazione Sandretto Re Rebaudengo in Turin. From 2004 through 2008 he was Artistic Director of the Villa Manin Contemporary Art Center in Codroipo, Italy. He directed the 2nd edition of the SITE Santa Fe Biennial in 1997, the 50th Venice Biennale in 2003, and was one of the curators of Manifesta 3 (2000) and the 2010 Whitney Biennial.

Bonami has also organised exhibitions at the Whitechapel Art Gallery (London), the Hayward Gallery (London), the Pinault Collection (Venice), the Walker Art Center (Minneapolis), the Musée d'Art Moderne de la Ville de Paris, the Hara Museum of Contemporary Art in Tokyo, the Qatar Museums Authority in Doha, Mudam in Luxembourg and the JNBY Foundation in Hangzhou.

In 2013 Bonami wrote in La Stampa that the Venice City Council decision to remove the "Boy with Frog" sculpture by Charles Ray from the front of the Punta della dogana was "administrative cowardice" and that the lamppost which replaced it represented "a moment of cultural darkness". In 2019, he started the new column on ARTnews, Ask a Curator. In 2021, as a controversy sparked about the dominance of white men at senior positions in Chinese museums, Bonami responded with a rant challenging racial and gender stereotypes about white men: "Under the new identity rules and laws, this article assumes, by how we look, that inside of ourselves, we feel always like white, ageing, western man. And this is not true, for example in my case, I often, often, felt inside myself, to be, sometimes, a thirty-five-year-old Iranian lesbian. So they don’t know what I feel inside." His rants on social networks also targeted far-right populism in Italy. In 2021, he launched his own NFTs.

In October 2026, he was named artistic director of the GES-2 House of Culture in Moscow, funded by Leonid MIkhelson's V-A-C Foundation.

== Publications ==
Bonami has authored monographs on the work of Doug Aitken, Gabriele Basilico, Vanessa Beecroft, Glenn Brown, Maurizio Cattelan, Dan Colen, Thomas Demand, Damien Hirst, Jeff Koons, Luisa Lambri, Albert Oehlen, Gabriel Orozco, Marjetica Potrč, Carol Rama, Rudolf Stingel and Jeff Wall, amongst others.

== Auction activities ==
In October 2014, Bonami presented a partially available for sale exhibition of contemporary sculpture at Phillips in London. The following year, he organised an auction of 50 works of Italian art at Phillips New York, including Paola Pivi, Roberto Cuoghi and Maurizio Cattelan.

== Other activities ==
- Gagosian Gallery, Member of the Board of Directors (since 2022)
