= David Vahtangovich Kutaliya =

Russian lawyer

David Vakhtangovich Kutaliya
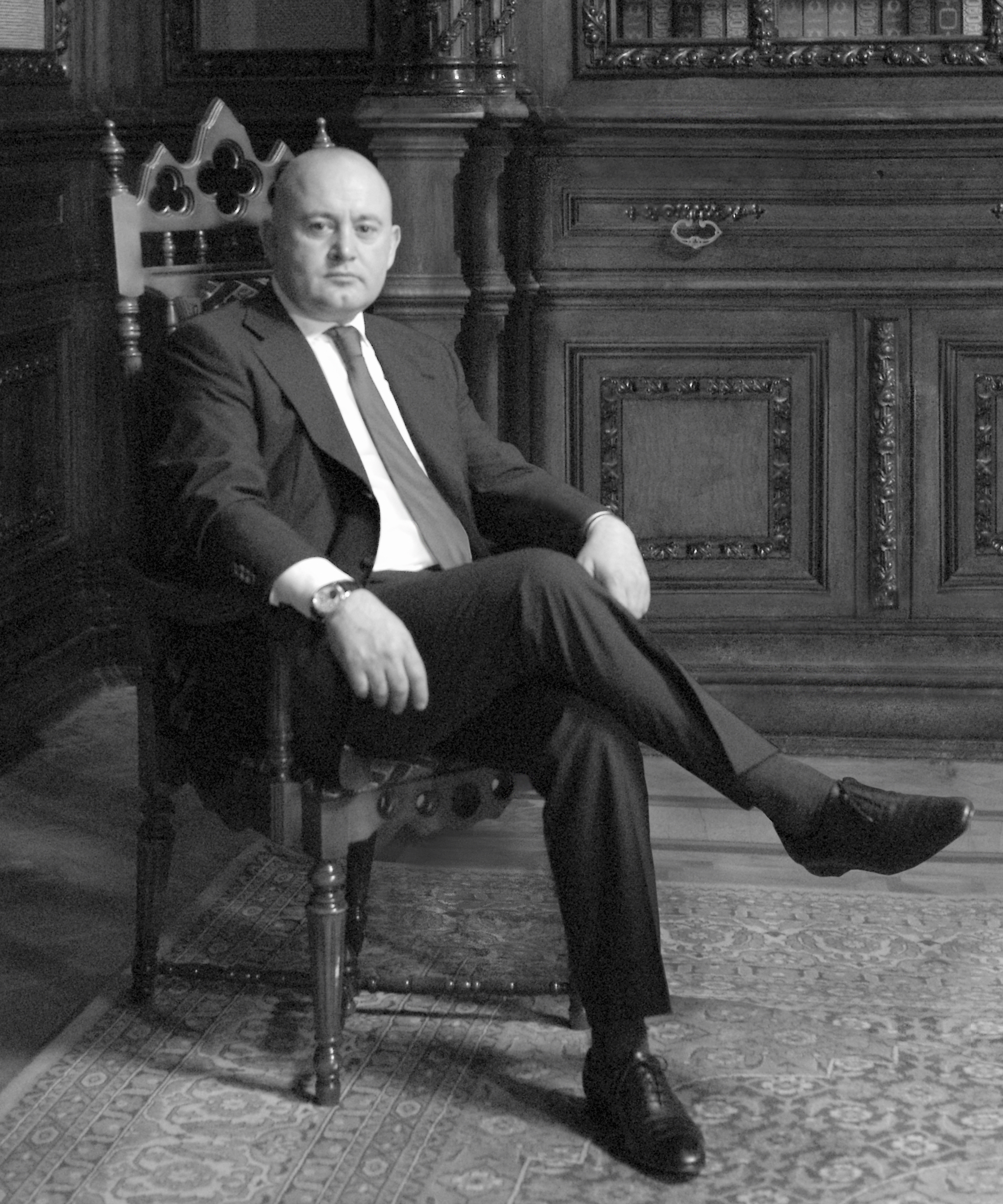
- Born: 6 February 1966 (age 59); Sukhumi, Abkhazia, Georgian SSR
- Occupations: lawyer; Prosecutor

David Vakhtangovich Kutaliya (Russian: Давид Вахтангович Куталия; born 1966) is a former Russian lawyer and prosecutor. He specialised in resolving investigations and preventing serious crimes, and supervised the execution of law by authorities conducting operational-search measures and preliminary investigations.

== Early life and education ==
David Vakhtangovich Kutaliya was born on 6 February 1966 in Sukhumi, Abkhazia, Georgian Soviet Socialist Republic to a family of public servants. He was named after David Meskhi, who served in a jury court. From 1972 to 1983, Kutaliya attended secondary school at Shota Rustaveli No. 1 in Gagra and graduated with honours. He studied English in his hometown, taught by MSIIR graduates. In continuing his English studies, he applied to university in Leningrad (since 1991 Saint Petersburg) and Solnechnogorsk, where he studied alongside L. A. Kirillova, the mother of avant-garde painter Iya Kirillova.

In 1983, he entered the Faculty of Law at Leningrad State University and graduated in 1989, majoring in jurisprudence. His thesis was titled "British government during the bourgeois revolution (1640–1642 period)". He holds a PhD in law. The main lectures on criminology were given by Doctor of Law, Professor Alexander Bastrykin.

Between 1983 and 1989, he worked for the UPR-10 construction trust N20 of Glavleningradstroy as a transport labourer, scaffolding worker, and bricklayer. He was Deputy Secretary of the Komsomol, Chief of the Voluntary People's Druzhina trust, and a member of the Kirov district druzhina. In February 1988, by decision of the management number 10, he was admitted as a member of the Communist Party of the Soviet Union. Recommendations for entry into the ranks of the party were given by construction foreman V. I. Moskalev and party Secretary of Management V. Makarov.

== Career ==
After graduating from Leningrad State, he began working in the Office of the Procurator General of the Soviet Union. During the period he was directed to various Soviet republics and regions of the Russian Federation to carry out special tasks, including in "hot spots". He was promoted with rights of the Prosecutor general of the Soviet Union and Prosecutor general of Russian Federation. From 1997 to 2007, he successively held the positions of intern, investigator, and senior investigator in the Baltic branch of the Northwestern Transport Prosecutor's Office. At the same time he gave lectures to students of the Faculty of Law of the Academy of Civil Aviation in criminal law and criminology.

Kutaliya continued to serve in the Saint Petersburg Prosecutor's Office as Forensic Prosecutor, Deputy Prosecutor of Saint Petersburg's Nevsky district, Senior Forensic Prosecutor, and acting head of the Department of Criminology, where from 1998 to 2001, he worked under the direct supervision of Nikolay Vinnichenko, and from 2001 to 2005 under Aleksandr Konovalov. In November–December 2000 he took advanced training courses at the St. Petersburg Law Institute of the Prosecutor General, specializing in "The use of forensic technology and specific support for investigation of crimes". He was recognized as the leading forensic prosecutor in a memo from acting head of the Department of Criminology V. N. Isaenko, who was conducting an audit of the forensic units in the Northwestern Federal District.

=== Osh clashes ===
In 1990, he conducted a criminal investigation in the cities of Osh and Uzgen as part of the investigative group of the Prosecutor General's Office and independently. He investigated criminal cases in the region of the Kirghiz SSR on the ethnic conflict between the Kyrgyz and Uzbek peoples. Investigative work was carried out in the Uzbek and Kazakh SSR regions as well.

=== Terrorist act against member of Dagestan Parliament ===
In 1992 he was sent to Makhachkala as part of the joint investigative group of the Prosecutor's Office, where the Ministry of Internal Affairs and Federal Counterintelligence Service were investigating the 13 February 1992 terrorist attack on the head doctor of the Republican diagnostic center and Member of the Parliament of Dagestan M. M. Suleymanov.

=== Ossetian-Ingush conflict and hostage situation ===
In autumn 1992, by order of Deputy Prosecutor General E. K. Lisov, he arrived in North Ossetia for the criminal investigation related to the ethno-political conflict in Prigorodny, North Ossetia, which led to the 30 October – 6 November 1992 armed clashes and multiple victims of the Ossetian and Ingush population. He was captured and held hostage in the Chernorechensky area by unidentified men armed with grenades and assault rifles, together with individuals who were listed as victims in the criminal case. The condition put forth by the perpetrators: voluntarily hand over the victims – elderly Ingush people, who they were going to execute, in exchange for safe passage to the investigative team's location, together with doctor of the Nazran city hospital V. I. Dino (an ethnic German), accompanying Kutaliya as forensic medical examiner. Both the investigator and the doctor refused. Released together with all hostages by Alpha Special Forces unit with participation of А. A. Kotenkov, who personally went to the scene of the crime.

=== Explosion aboard a vessel of the Navy's yacht club 55 ===
In June 1993, he initiated and investigated a criminal case on the Gulf of Finland explosion aboard the Orlan vessel, belonging to the Navy's yacht club 55, with former secretary of State under the President of the Russian Federation G. E. Burbulis and other individuals aboard at the time.

=== Larionov brothers case ===
In 1994–1996, as part of the Investigations unit of the Prosecutor General of the Russian Federation in Vladivostok, Kutaliya investigated the criminal case of the Larionov brothers gang – one of the largest and most highly organized OPG's since the beginning of the 1990s. Awarded with lapel badge of the Operational-search UR ATC Primorsky district directorate.

Met with columnist of the newspaper Izvestia I. V. Korolkov during the assignment, who devoted several pages to him in his book. On the basis of case materials, a documentary film was shot by director Andrey Karpenko, as part of the Criminal Russia series. The film shows original footage of the band's chief hitman Mikhail Sokolov's interrogation by head investigator Kutaliya in the Federal Detention Center 1. Particulars of the criminal case were used by Professor V. L. Vasiliev in his "Legal psychology" textbook to describe the psychological workings of an organized crime group, as well as the conflicts and contradictions that arise within gang structures.

=== Investigation of criminal cases against the former Prime Minister of North Ossetia-Alania and government officials ===
In 2006, he investigated criminal cases against the former Prime Minister of the Government of the Republic of North Ossetia, who fully confessed to the malfeasance charges presented, as well as the head of administration of the President and the Government, who personally and through his defendants in Moscow held lengthy negotiations between the aforementioned Prime Minister, and Deputy Prosecutor General of the Russian Federation V. Kolesnikov on the conclusion of a pre-trial arrangement. During the course of investigations the team received accurate information about the mining of one of the Vladikavkaz bridges, which, in particular, was used by Kutaliya to walk to work, that was supposed to explode at a time he was on it. Counter-intelligence agents of North Ossetia-Alania disarmed the explosive device. Due to the transfer of V. I. Kolesnikov to the Ministry of justice, the investigative team was disbanded and Kutaliya was sent to Moscow for further investigation of criminal cases related to smuggling, and with respect to the founders and directors of "Evroset", before the case was concluded. On 26 October 2006 by order of the Prosecutor General of the Russian Federation Kutaliya was awarded the Honorary serviceman of the Prosecutor of the Russian Federation badge for perseverance and professionalism demonstrated during the investigation of criminal cases.

In April 2007 he was appointed to post of Deputy Head of department for supervision over investigation of particularly significant cases - as head of the department for supervision over procedural activities of the Central office of the Prosecutor General within the investigation of corruption crimes in the economic sphere of the Prosecutor General of the Russian Federation, as part of the transfer from the St. Petersburg Prosecutor's office.

In September 2007 appointed as Deputy head of the department for supervision over the investigation of criminal cases in the Central apparatus of the Investigative Committee Procuracy of the Russian Federation, with the Russian Interior Ministry, Federal drug control service of Russia, Federal Bailiff Service of Russia and the Federal Customs Service of the Prosecutor General of the Russian Federation — the head of the second department for supervision over investigation of criminal cases in the Investigative Committee of the Procuracy of the Russian Federation, and later the Investigative Committee of the Russian Federation. Assistant attorney General of the Russian Federation.

On 17 January 2008, by order of the Prosecutor General of the Russian Federation, he was awarded with For loyalty to law II degree insignia badge for the continued exemplary fulfilment of official duties, and faultless service within the bodies of the Prosecutor's office.

=== Murder of the prosecutor of Saratov region ===
In March 2008, under the chairmanship of the Volga district court of Saratov - A. G. Paramonov, supported the petition of investigator for particularly important cases V. P. Ribalkin of the Investigative Committee under the Prosecutor's Office of the Russian Federation on the selection of a measure of restraint in the form of detention against the organizers and executors of the murder of Saratov region public Prosecutor E. F. Grigoriev. By the decree of the President of the Russian Federation dated 9 June 2008 No.904 was awarded the rank of state advisor of justice 3rd class.

=== Murder of A. M. Magomedtagirov ===
In the summer of 2009, after study and analysis of criminal evidence, results of the OSA, as well as visit to site of the Ministry of internal affairs A. M. Magomedtagirov murder committed on 5 June 2009, made a report, in the FSB Counterterrorism center of the Russian Federation, located near the town of Makhachkala to the Prosecutor General of the Russian Federation Y. Y. Chaika, Minister of Internal Affairs of Russia R. G. Nurgaliev, Chairman of the Investigative Committee of the Prosecutor's office of Russian Federation A. I. Bastrikin and other colleagues, expressing his point of view on the future direction of the preliminary investigation.

=== Spanish "Troika" operation ===
By order of the Prosecutor General Chaika, Kutaliya was sent to the Royal Anti-corruption Prosecutor’ office in Spain (Madrid) to participate in negotiations with Spanish colleagues, investigating criminal cases against former citizens of the USSR and the Russian Federation, detained during operation code name "Troika".

=== Pirate attack on the Arctic Sea motor vessel ===
Kutaliya participated in the criminal investigation on the pirate seizure of the Arctic Sea cargo ship in 2009. The case was complicated by the lack of established practices and lack of actual information at the time of the decision to initiate criminal proceedings. At the same time David Vahtangovich's previous work experience at the Baltic transport Prosecutor's office and knowledge of the UN Convention on the Law of the Sea and other agreements in the field of international maritime law were taken into consideration. The crime was resolved and pirates neutralized in the open sea thanks to the cooperation of the Russian Federation FSB and Ministry of Defence. Several European countries also opened parallel criminal investigations into the capture of Arctic Sea. During the course of the case resolution by Prosecutor General Chaika, Kutaliya was commandeered to Eurojust (Hague, Holland) and the Finland State Security Police (Helsinki), at the invitation of foreign colleagues.

=== Attempt to discredit, preliminary investigation and court decision ===
In 2009, the Main Investigation Department of the Investigative Committee under the Prosecutor's Office of the Russian Federation conducted a preliminary investigation to verify facts about Deputy head of the department for supervision over investigation of particularly significant cases of Kutaliya, as set out in articles "How much money did David Kutaliya make on raider seizures" and "Is David Vahtangovich Kutaliya ready to answer the inquiry’s questions?", published in the electronic version of The Moscow Post in July–August 2009. During the course of investigation, facts of the crimes allegedly committed by Kutaliya were not substantiated. In this regard, a ruling on the refusal to initiate criminal proceeding was passed. On 15 October 2009 Federal judge of the Izmailovsky district court of Moscow I. V. Sukhanova ruled on the claim toward "The Moscow Post" electronic newspaper, wherein the information disseminated via the "Russian public-political online newspaper The Moscow Post" was deemed not corresponding to reality, discrediting the honor, dignity and business reputation of Kutaliya David Vahtangovich. In doing so, the court also ordered the periodical to publish a public refutation on the newspaper's website, and sought a total of 75,000 in the name of the plaintiff, which Kutaliya requested to transfer to one of the orphanages of the same district in his statement of claim. Neither the article's author Sergey Nerestov (false pseudonym), nor representatives of the editorial board, or their legal representatives were present at the court hearing. The editorial board could not be located at the registered address.

The court decision entered into force, but is still not fulfilled.

=== Case on the raider seizures of enterprises and real estate in St. Petersburg ===
After contacting the FSB Director of Russia, on behalf of the leadership of the Prosecutor General of the Russian Federation, Kutaliya, together with the Director General at the Judicial Department under the Supreme Court of the Russian Federation A. V. Gusev, took care of organizational and technical security matters of executing the field session of the Kuibyshev regional court of St. Petersburg in the Moscow city court pertaining to facts of illegal seizures of enterprises and real estate in St. Petersburg, committed by an organized group under the leadership of Vladimir Barsukov (Kumarin) and Vyacheslav Drokov. In addition, the prosecutor directly subordinated to him supported the state allegations towards the individuals aforementioned.

=== Dismissal from Prosecutor's office ===
Two years later, in November 2011 relieved of his post and dismissed at his own request by the order of Prosecutor General of the Russian Federation Y. Y. Chaika due to retirement after years of service in the Prosecutor's office.

== Community work ==
From 2002, he was an active member of the Russian Geographical Society (RGO). From 2002 to 2009 he was on the RGO's board of trustees. On 1 June 2004 he was awarded the Grand Duke Konstantin Nikolaevich Gold Medal "for merit" by the RGO. On 22 April 2016 in the city of Moscow, the interregional public organization "Outstanding generals and naval commanders of the Fatherland", headed by former Prosecutor General of the USSR A. Y. Sukharev, decided to award Kutaliya the For loyalty to the Fatherland No.0011 medal.

== Personal life ==
Kutaliya's father, Vahtang Abramovich Kutaliya (8 April 1928 – 7 December 2004), was a native of Gali, Abkhazia and worked as a senior industrial engineer. His mother Dalila Noewna Kutaliya (née Asatiani) (7 June 1945 – 11 April 2017) graduated from the Sukhumi State Music School and taught solfeggio and musical literature.

His grandfather Abram Malkhazovich Kutaliya (30 October 1903 – 16 May 1984) served in the office of the investigator of the Military Prosecutor of the Transcaucasian Military District and the Georgian SSR justice system.

He does stereophotography.
