= Izmaylovsky =

Izmaylovsky (masculine), Izmaylovskaya (feminine), or Izmaylovskoye (neuter) may refer to:

- Izmaylovsky Regiment, a subdivision of the 1st Guards Infantry Division of the Imperial Russian Guard
- Izmaylovskaya (Moscow Metro), a station of the Moscow Metro, Russia
- Izmaylovskaya gang, a criminal organization in the Russian mafia
- Izmaylovskoye Municipal Okrug, a municipal okrug of Admiralteysky District of St. Petersburg, Russia
- Izmaylovsky (inhabited locality) (Izmaylovskaya, Izmaylovskoye), several rural localities in Russia

== See also ==
- Izmaylovsky Park
- Izmaylov
- Izmaylovo (disambiguation)
