= Ismailov =

Ismailov, Ismayilov or Ismaylov (Russian: Исмаилов) is a masculine surname common in the former Soviet countries, its feminine counterpart is Ismailova, Ismayilova or Ismaylova. It is slavicised from the given name Ismail. It is most common in Russia, Azerbaijan and Uzbekistan. It may refer to:

== Ismailava ==
- Leila Ismailava (born 1989), Belarusian journalist

== Ismailov ==
- Abduhashim Ismailov, Kurdish musician from Uzbekistan
- Abdulkhakim Ismailov (1916–2010), Soviet soldier
- Adam Ismailov (born 1976), Russian football player
- Aleksandr Ismailov (born 1951), Lithuanian orientalist turkologist
- Ali Ismayilov (born 1974), Azerbaijani boxer
- Aliyar Ismailov (born 1976), Russian football player
- Anzur Ismailov (born 1985), Uzbekistani football player
- Eduard Ismailov (born 1990), Ukrainian football defender
- Hamid Ismailov (born 1954), Uzbekistani journalist
- Jamshed Ismailov (born 1987), Tajikistani football player
- Ruslan Ismailov (sport shooter) (born 1986), Kyrgyzstani sport shooter
- Ruslan Ismailov (swimmer) (born 1989), Kyrgyzstani swimmer
- Tagi Ismailov (1887–1958), Azerbaijani military commander
- Telman Ismailov (born 1956), Azerbaijani-born Russian-Turkish entrepreneur and businessman
- Temur Ismailov (born 1995), Uzbekistani tennis player

== Ismailova ==
- Tolekan Ismailova, Kyrgyz human rights defender
- Tanzila Ismailova, (born 1997), Slunsekarre. Reached top 600 of the game 2048. Better known as an Artiste.

== Ismayilov ==
- Adil Ismayilov (1957–2020), Azerbaijani lawyer and investigator
- Afran Ismayilov (born 1988), Azerbaijani footballer
- Daniyar İsmayilov (born 1992), Turkmenistani-Turkish weightlifter
- Elchin Ismayilov (born 1982), Azerbaijani judoka
- Fakhri Ismayilov (born 1995), known as Fahree, Azerbaijani singer and songwriter
- Huseynali Ismayilov (born 1961), Azerbaijani academic
- Ilyas Ismayilov (1938–2025), Azerbaijani politician
- Najafgulu Ismayilov (1923–1990), Azerbaijani painter
- Rafiz Ismayilov (1939–2025), Azerbaijani film director and screenwriter

== See also ==
- Qasım İsmayılov
- Izmaylov
- İsmailoğlu
