= Smajić =

Origin
- Language: Bosnian
- Meaning: son of Ismail
- Region of origin: Bosnia and Herzegovina

Other names
- See also: İsmailoğlu, Smajli

Smajić is a Bosnian surname. Its literal meaning of "descendant of Ismail" is similar to that of the Albanian surname Smajli and the Turkish family name İsmailoğlu and it may indicate Muslim religious affiliation of its bearers. People with the name include:

- Admir Smajić (born 1963), Bosnian former footballer
- Armin Smajić (born 1964), Bosnian football manager and former player
- Edin Smajić (born 1971), Bosnian footballer
- Edis Smajić (born 1999), Bosnian footballer
- Emir Smajic (born 1989), Swedish-Bosnian footballer
- Haris Smajić (born 1960), Bosnian former footballer
- Kabir Smajić (born 1977), Bosnian former footballer
- Petar Smajić (1910–1985), Croatian painter
- Sulejman Smajić (born 1984), Bosnian footballer
