= Damien Quintard =

- Born: 21 June 1991 (age 34); Paris, France
- Occupations: Record producer, audio engineer, composer
- Years active: 2012–present

Damien Quintard (born 21 June 1991) is a French record producer, composer, engineer and entrepreneur known for his work with artists Brian Eno, Justice, Parcels, Teodor Currentzis, Arca, L’Impératrice, Dimitris Papaioannou, and Bertrand Chamayou.

He is also the Founder and CEO of The Mono Company (2018) a production company and SoundX (2019) a firm focused on Research and Innovation. Their first project, numéro un, focuses on bringing music to the Deaf Community, with the first Artificial Intelligence made for and calibrated by institutes around the world and a patented vibration pack that translates sounds in real time.

He co-founded with Brad Pitt “Miraval Studios” in 2021, a recording studio inside Chateau Miraval, bought by Pitt and Angelina Jolie in 2009. Bringing back to life the iconic “Studio Miraval”, considered in the 70s till the late 90s as one of the most prestigious studios in the world, recording acts such as Pink Floyd (The Wall), AC/DC, Rammstein, Sting, Muse among others.

Quintard's latest awards and recognitions comprise an Emmy Award for Outstanding Live and Direct to Tape Sound Mixing for the 2015-2016 European Olympic Opening Ceremony and getting in Forbes France's list of Forbes 30 under 30.

== Background ==
Quintard was born in Paris. Inspired by his multicultural childhood spent across the globe in Mumbai, Hong Kong and Singapore, Quintard started to learn music theory and piano at the age of 3. He pursued his musical education in different conservatories and local music schools. He returned to Paris in his teenage years and started the band, Dot Legacy, that successfully toured around Europe, Brazil and Canada winning the Best International Emerging Artist award at the Canadian Indie Week in December 2018. Fascinated by science, specifically maths and physics, he studied aerospace engineering before turning to audio engineering.

Quintard's first recordings were charity based for the National Institute for the Young and Blind (INJA) in Paris where his sister, Soprano Aurore Quintard, would often sing. He dived deeper into the world of sound and audio engineering and created his first professional recordings for the renowned studio Little Tribeca, where he worked as Studio Manager. During this time, he recorded and produced many award-winning productions such as Schumann, Schubert, Brahms with Lise Berthaud & Adam Laloum and Johann Adolf Hasse: Siroe, Re di Persiaith Max Emmanuel Cenčić & George Petrou.

== Career ==
Damien Quintard started recording, mixing and mastering the rising classical star Teodor Currentzis and his orchestra musicAeterna in 2012. Throughout the years, Currentzis became a friend and a mentor who helped improve Quintard's technique and detailed work. Their collaboration resulted in a series of recognized awards, particularly for Tchaikovsky's 6th Symphony and Mozart's Don Giovanni that won respectively the Gold and Silver Record Academy Award in Japan – that being the first time in 55 iterations that the same artist wins the top two prizes consecutively.

These recordings successfully won several awards, counting the Diapason d'Or (2017) and the Gramophone Classical Music Award (2018) for Tchaikovsky's Symphony No. 6 as well as the BBC Magazine Music Award (2017) for Mozart's Don Giovanni – amongst many others.

In 2015, he worked with Dimitris Papaioannou and Vangelino Currentzis on the production of the Baku European Games Opening Ceremony in Azerbaijan. The ceremony was nominated by the National Academy of Television, Arts and Sciences for an Emmy Award, granting the Sound Engineering and Production Department a golden statuette for Outstanding Live and Direct to Tape Sound Mixing. This particular production focused on the unusual blending of different genres going from Lady Gaga’s live performance and interpretation of Imagine by John Lennon to Jean Sibelius and traditional Azeri music.

Quintard and Peter Qvortrup, CEO of Audio Note Ltd, started their collaboration in 2016. Both pushing, with their respective companies, to create a revolutionary line of audio equipment. To this day, Quintard’s Paris studio The Mono Company is equipped with four Audio Note systems including Tomei AN-E Alnico Sogon and Meishu AN-E SPeHE.

In 2018, he co-produced with Les Films Jack Fébus as Lead Sound Engineer the broadcast of the Sónar Festival in Barcelona, Spain where acts such as LCD Sound System, Laurent Garnier, Thom Yorke, Richie Hawtin and Gorillaz were recorded live.

In 2019, DAU, a project quoted to be “the most insane shoot of all time” by the Telegraph and “the most expansive, complicated, all-consuming film project ever attempted” by GQ opened its world premiere in Paris. Film director Ilya Khrzhanovsky and musical producer Vangelino Currentzis along with Damien Quintard joined their minds to create an experience blending live performances and complex sound processing during 30 days and nights.

For the Grand World Opening of the project happening between the Théâtre du Châtelet, the Théâtre de la Ville and the Pompidou Center, Quintard was assigned as Head of Production and Performances as well as Head of the Sound and Concerts Department where he worked with and produced artists such as Teodor Currentzis, Brian Eno, Marko Nikodijevic and Arca.

That same year, he collaborated with the French Artist Philippe Parreno, Arca and Oscar winning sound designer Nicolas Becker to create a piece for MoMA’s 2019 reopening: Echo, an installation using motorized sculptures, light, video animation and hyperspatial speakers which responds to the room’s sound. Parreno refers to Echo as a “sensible and sentient autopoetic automaton that perceives and reflects.”

In 2019, Quintard also founded SoundX (Sound Exploration Technologies), an innovative company that provides tools and solutions for more inclusivity. The first project, numéro un - designed in close collaboration with the National Institute for deaf children of Paris - is the first ever AI built for and calibrated by the deaf community. The AI translates in real time sounds into vibration and sends the adjusted signal to the first patented vibration pack entirely made for the deaf community. This is part of a global ecosystem where SoundX links the effort of multiple institutes across the world to create a common language that crosses all borders.

In 2020, Damien Quintard contributed to the development of the Dolby Atmos Music format, making The Mono Company, the first Dolby Atmos Music Certified studio in France. Early productions had an immediate success with amazon exclusive release from Warner music: 3D Classical hits breaking all streaming records for an immersive release.

Quintard produced the immersive mix of the first French music release in this sound format: Takotsubo, from the band l’Impératrice. Singer Flore Benguigui, says of the Dolby Atmos mix: “I was blown away by the experience…there’s a warmth and a feeling of closeness, it’s much more human and touching. I would describe it as a fusion of sound and space.”

Considered as one of the reference mixers for the format, Quintard is working closely with Warner, Universal, Sony, Amazon, Because as well as with artists from the French Touch movement such as Justice and The Supermen Lovers.

Quintard also received in 2020 the distinction of being nominated and entering the Forbes 30 under 30 list. This list represents Forbes top pick of the 30 brightest young entrepreneurs, leaders in France.

In 2021, Quintard became the sound Director for GES-2, a cultural center in Moscow, Russia. Part of the VAC foundation, Quintard designed the entire audio system and concert capacities of GES-2 in collaboration with Renzo Piano to make it a vector of local and international culture.

In more recent history, Quintard teamed up with Brad Pitt in a joint venture to bring back to life the iconic Studio Miraval. Created by Jacques Loussier & Patrice Quef, French jazz pianist, in the late 1970s to the early 1990s, the Studio was one of the most prestigious studios in Europe. Recording part of “The Wall” of Pink Floyd and other artists like AC/DC, The Cure, Muse, Wham!, Sade, Steve Winwood, the Gipsy Kings, Sting, and The Cranberries. Pitt and Quintard rebranded the new studio “Miraval Studios” and has capacities for recording a wide variety of music and includes cinema and post-production facilities.

== Quotes ==
"You can't categorize Damien Quintard. He has engineered huge acts, managed recording studios, produced huge events and helped broadcast massive festivals. He has now set up the Mono Company which does all of the above, and more, with the biggest names, the best equipment and no compromises…" - Aston Microphones

== Recent awards ==
- 2016 - Emmy Award - Lead Sound Engineer and Producer for the Baku Olympic Games Opening Ceremony
- 2017 - Diapason D’Or - Producing, Recording, Edit, Mix and Mastering of Tchaikovsky 6th Symphony with Teodor Currentzis
- 2017 - BBC Magazine Music Award - Recording, Edit, Mix and Mastering of Mozart's Don Giovanni with Teodor Currentzis
- 2017 - Japan Academy Award Gold - Producing, Recording, Edit, Mix and Mastering of Tchaikovsky 6th Symphony with Teodor Currentzis
- 2017 - Japan Academy Award Silver - Recording, Edit, Mix and Mastering of Mozart's Don Giovanni with Teodor Currentzis
- 2018 - Gramophone Classical Music Award - Producing, Recording, Edit, Mix and Mastering of Tchaikovsky 6th Symphony with Teodor Currentzis
- 2018 - Edison Award - The most prestigious price in the Netherlands was awarded to Tchaikovsky Symphony #6 with Teodor Currentzis
- 2018 - Japan Academy Award (Best Album of the Year + Best Orchestral Work) - Mahler Symphony No. 6 with Teodor Currentzis and musicAeterna
- 2020 - Diapason D’Or - Producing, Recording, Edit, Mix and Mastering of “Goodnight!” with Bertrand Chamayou ft. Bryce Dessner
- 2020 - Forbes 30 under 30 France - Top pick of the 30 brightest young entrepreneurs, leaders in France by Forbes
- 2021 - IoT Awards - Innovation Project for SoundX's Numéro UN
