= Izmaylovo =

Izmaylovo or Izmailovo (Russian: Изма́йлово) may refer to:

- Izmaylovo District, a district of Eastern Administrative Okrug, Moscow, Russia
- Izmaylovo (Moscow Central Circle), a station on the Moscow Central Circle, Russia
- Izmailovo Hotel, largest hotel complex in Moscow, Russia
- Izmaylovo, Ulyanovsk Oblast, an urban-type settlement in Ulyanovsk Oblast, Russia
- Izmaylovo, Moscow Oblast, a settlement in Moscow Oblast, Russia
- Izmaylovo Estate of Alexis I of Russia

== See also ==
- Izmaylov
- Izmaylovsky (disambiguation)
