= İsmailoğlu =

Origin
- Language: Turkish from Arabic
- Meaning: son of Ismail
- Region of origin: Turkey

Other names
- See also: Ismailov, Izmaylov, Smajli, Smajić

İsmailoğlu is a Turkish surname. Its literal meaning of "descendant of Ismail" is similar to that of the Bosnian surname Smajić and the Albanian family name Smajli and it strongly indicates Muslim religious affiliation of its bearer. People with the name include:

- Meliha İsmailoğlu (born 1993), Bosnian-Turkish female volleyball player
- Yaşar İsmailoğlu (born 1945), Turkish-Cypriot poet, writer and journalist
