= Sabahudin Bujak =

Yugoslav footballer

Personal information
- Date of birth: October 20, 1959 (age 67)
- Place of birth: Trebinje, SFR Yugoslavia
- Position: Striker

Youth career
- Čelik

Senior career*
Years	Team	Apps	(Gls)
1981–1982	Čelik	7	(0)
1983–1991	Leotar	178	(67)
1994–1997	Čelik	35	(23)
- * Club domestic league appearances and goals

Sabahudin Bujak (born October 20, 1959, in Trebinje, SFR Yugoslavia) is a former Bosnian-Herzegovinian football player and now a football youth coach at NK Čelik Zenica.

== Playing career ==
=== Club ===
Bujak started his career in the youth squads of NK Čelik Zenica eventually breaking into the first team. However, faced with little playing chances, he moved to FK Leotar Trebinje where he became a prolific goalscorer in the Yugoslav Second League.

He eventually found his way back to NK Čelik Zenica and was an integral part of their successes in the first few seasons of the independent Bosnia & Herzegovina. During the 1994 season and the final tournament held in Zenica, he was the joint top goalscorer together with Dželaludin Muharemović with 3 goals. The team captain also scored the only goal in the Bosnian Cup final against FK Sloboda Tuzla that brought his team their first double title. The following year he continued with his good form when Čelik celebrated their second double in a row. Although 37 at the time, his 3rd season in Čelik proved to be successful as well when he won the third title in a row. He retired after the first part of the 1997/98 season and joined the coaching team.

== Coaching career ==
Bujak has been a loyal servant to NK Čelik Zenica coaching the senior and youth teams at the club since the second part of the 1997/98 season. He was the assistant manager to Vlatko Glavaš in the second part of the 2011/12 season.
