= Smajli =

Origin
- Language: Albanian via Turkish from Arabic
- Meaning: son of Ismail
- Region of origin: Albania

Other names
- See also: İsmailoğlu, Smajić

Smajli is an Albanian surname. Its literal meaning is "son of Ismail", which is similar to that of the Bosnian surname Smajić and the Turkish family name İsmailoğlu and it may indicate Muslim religious affiliation of its bearer. Notable people with the name include:

- Brikena Smajli (born 1970), Albanian writer
- Dritan Smajli (born 1985), Albanian footballer
- Geralb Smajli (born 2002), footballer
- Tringe Smajli (1880–1917), Albanian guerrilla fighter
