= Hadžiahmetović =

Hadžiahmetović is a surname. Notable people with the surname include:

- Aćif Hadžiahmetović (1887–1945), Albanian politician
- Amir Hadžiahmetović (born 1997), Danish-Bosnian footballer
- Nermin Hadžiahmetović (born 1953), Bosnian football manager
