= Izmaylov =

Izmaylov, İzmaylov or Izmailov (Russian: Измайлов) is a masculine surname common in the former Soviet countries, derived from the given name Ismail. Its feminine counterpart is Izmailova, İzmayılova or Izmaylova. It may refer to:

- Alexander Izmaylov (1779–1831), Russian fabulist, prosaist, and journalist
- Chingis Izmailov (1944–2011), Russian psychophysiologist and psychophysicist
- Enver İzmaylov, Ukrainian folk-jazz musician
- Galiya Izmaylova (1923–2010), Soviet ballerina and People's Artist of the USSR
- Gerasim Izmailov, (1745–1795) Russian sea explorer
- Katerina Izmailova (swimmer) (born 1977), Tajikistani swimmer
- Marat Izmailov, (born 1982) Russian football player
- Michelle Izmaylov, (born 1991) Russian/American novelist
- Sergey Izmaylov (born 1975), Ukrainian triple jumper
- Tolekan Ismailova, Kyrgyz human rights defender
- Vyacheslav Izmailov, army major and later correspondent, human rights hero of the First Chechen War in the 1990s
- Züleyxa Izmailova (born 1985), Estonian politician

== Fictional characters ==
- Katerina Izmailova, the protagonist of the novel Lady Macbeth of the Mtsensk District and its adaptations

== See also ==
- Ismailov
- İsmailoğlu
