= Bermet Borubaeva =

Kyrgyzstani activist and artist

Bermet Borubaeva Бермет Борубаева
- Born: Bishkek
- Education: Kyrgyz-Russian Slavic University; Art East School of Contemporary Art (2009)
- Known for: environmental activism, human rights advocacy
- Style: Socially engaged art, curatorial activism
- Movement: Environmental and contemporary Art
- Awards: Prince Claus Fund (2022)

Bermet Borubaeva (Kyrgyz: Бермет Борубаева) is a Kyrgyzstani human rights activist and artist. She is known for her campaigning on environmental issues, notably founding the #BishkekSmog initiative to address the issue of air pollution in Bishkek, and often incorporates her activism into her art.

== Early life and education ==
Borubaeva was born and raised in Bishkek, Kyrgyzstan; her father, Termikul Borubaev, worked as a mechanic, while her mother, Gulsina Borubaeva, worked at a salon. Borubaeva studied history for a year at the Kyrgyz-Russian Slavic University, before changing her degree and graduating with a bachelor's degree in political science; she went on to study for a master's degree in public policy. Borubaeva subsequently studied at the School of Contemporary Art "Art East", graduating in 2009, before moving to Moscow, Russia, to study at the First Moscow Curatorial Summer School under Viktor Misiano and the V-A-C Foundation.

== Activism ==
Borubaeva started her artistic career in Moscow, where she lived for four years before returning to Bishkek. Her art often focused on social issues, particularly those that had an impact on the environment, such as food production, labour, migration, and urbanisation. Borubaeva is known for her use of rubbish in her art, and in 2009 co-founded the TRASH Environmental Art Festival, which she continues to serve as co-curator of. Borubaeva has completed residencies at different institutions, including the Hyde Park Art Center in Chicago, United States; the Ujazdowski Castle Centre for Contemporary Art in Warsaw, Poland; the Kunstraum Dreiviertel in Bern, Switzerland; and the Vadim Sidur Museum in Moscow. In 2011, she curated the educational programme for the Bishkek presentation that was displayed at the Lingua Franca exhibition at the Central Asian Pavilion during the 54th Venice Biennale in Venice, Italy. Borubaeva went on to found the Bishkek School of Contemporary Art.

Borubaeva founded the #BishkekSmog initiative, which aimed to address environmental issues facing urban Bishkek, with a focus on air pollution, through the use of peaceful protests, campaigns, art exhibitions and documentaries. She has expressed concern about increasing urbanisation in Kyrgyzstan, particularly from rural areas to Bishkek, and local authorities' response to environmental issues, such as the melting of the country's glaciers. Borubaeva led a public campaign to stop the Bishkek government's attempt to reduce the number of electric trolleys operating in the city.

Borubaeva has criticised the Kyrgyz government's repression of dissent following the passing of a law in 2022 that temporarily imposed a court-sanctioned ban on protests being held in many public places, including government buildings, that had been routinely extended by the government. In December 2025, Borubaeva and fellow activist Tolekan Ismailova filed a petition with the Constitutional Court, requesting that it declare provisions that permitted local governments to restrict the time, location and route of rallies and protests as "unconstitutional".

At 10:00 KGT on 13 March 2026, Borubaeva and Ismailova, alongside filmmaker Bulat Satarkulov, were arrested in Bishkek while travelling to a planned peaceful protest in the Pervomaiskii district against the government's ban on freedom of assembly with signs reading "Right to Peaceful Assembly" (Russian: Право на свободу мирных собраний, romanized: Pravo na svobodu mirnykh sobraniy). Borubaeva was arrested despite it being alleged that the Kyrgyz authorities only had summons papers for Ismailova. After being detained for six hours at the Main Department of Internal Affairs of Bishkek, all three were released.

The Ireland-based human rights organisation Front Line Defenders condemned the arrests of Borubaeva and Ismailova, describing them as a "reprisal for their non-violent and legitimate human rights work".

== Recognition ==
In 2022, Borubaeva was awarded the Prince Claus Fund in recognition of "standing up for the environment through artistic research".
