= V-A-C Foundation =

International art non-profit based in Moscow

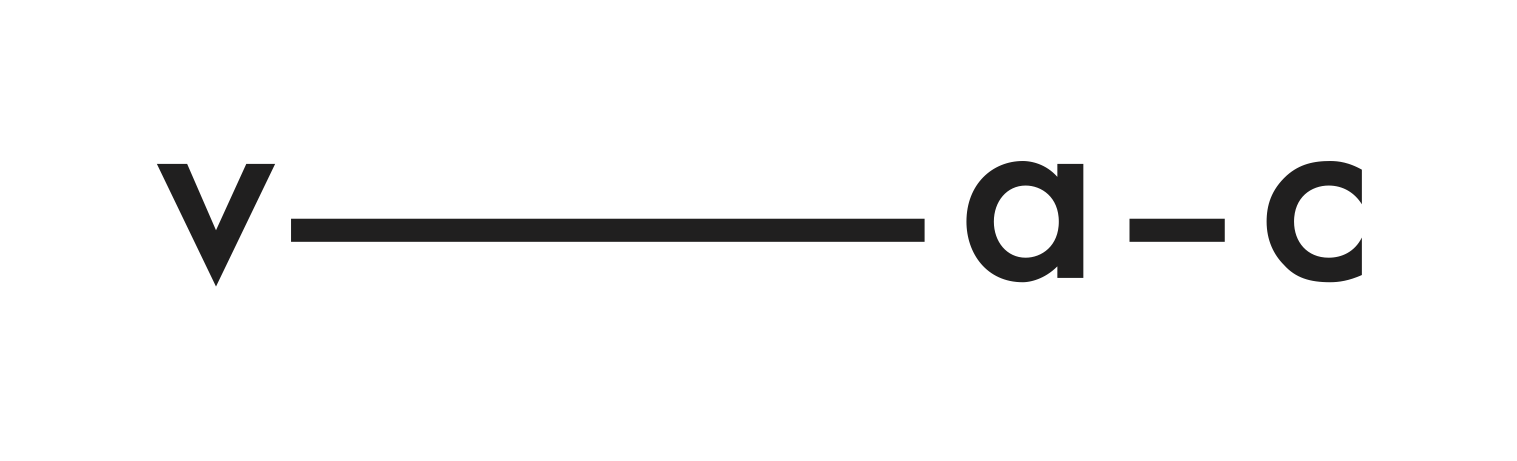
- Founded: 2009
- Founder: Leonid Mikhelson, Teresa Iarocci Mavica
- Purpose: Arts
- Location: Moscow, Russian Federation; Venice, Italy
- Region served: European Union, Russian Federation, United States
- Key people: Leonid Mikhelson, Teresa Mavica
- Website: www.v-a-c.ru

V-A-C Foundation is an international non-profit private organization founded in 2009 with an emphasis on supporting contemporary art exhibitions and projects emerging from Russia and the former Soviet Union.

== History ==
Founded in 2009 by businessman and philanthropist Leonid Mikhelson and Teresa Iarocci Mavica, who has been Director of the Foundation since its inception, the V-A-C Foundation is a nonprofit organization that initiates, supports, presents, and preserves contemporary art projects by internationally based visual and multidisciplinary artists, with a particular emphasis on artists located in, or emerging from, the Russian Federation and the former Soviet Union.

In 2015, Italian starchitect Renzo Piano was commissioned to design the foundation's venue (GES-2) in Moscow. In 2017, V-A-C Foundation's Venetian headquarter Zattere was launched. Located in a renovated historic palazzo situated on Zattere and overlooking the Canale della Giudecca, this venue hosts exhibitions, events and residencies. The renovation of the historic Palazzo delle Zattere was carried out by local architect Alessandro Pedron, transforming the building into a new centre for contemporary culture for the city of Venice.

Artists the organisation has supported include Bermet Borubaeva.

== See also ==
- Russian Abstract Art Foundation
