= Michelle Izmaylov =

American physician and writer

- Born: March 30, 1991 (age 34) Los Angeles, California, U.S.
- Occupation: Physician and author
- Education: Alpharetta High School; Vanderbilt University School of Medicine; Emory University (BS)
- Genre: Science-fiction and fantasy

Michelle Izmaylov (born March 30, 1991) is an American physician and author of science-fiction/fantasy books for young adults. She is also a narrative medicine essayist, and she currently serves as an Assistant Professor of Clinical Medicine at Vanderbilt University Medical Center.

== Early life and education ==
Michelle Izmaylov was born March 30, 1991, in Los Angeles, California. She is a first-generation Russian American, and lives in Atlanta, Georgia.

Izmaylov graduated from Alpharetta High School in 2009. In the previous year, she was selected as a member of 21st Century Leader's 20 Under 20.

She completed training as a resident physician in internal medicine at Vanderbilt University Medical Center after graduating from the Vanderbilt University School of Medicine as a Cornelius Vanderbilt Scholar and from Emory University in May 2013 with a Bachelor of Science in Biology and Chemistry.

== Career ==
The Pocket Watch, Izmaylov's first novel, was published when she was 13. Izmaylov's second book, Dream Saver, was published traditionally through Mercury Publishing when Izmaylov won an essay contest with the publisher. The book rose to number 5 on Barnes & Noble's daily Top 10 fantasy fiction best-seller list.

In May 2009, she joined FutureWord Publishing as Editor of Science-Fiction, Fantasy and Futuristic novels. In May 2011, she also joined World Castle Publications as a book illustrator. Her illustrated titles include Squazles! and Dart and the Squirrels.

Her third novel, Galaxy Watch, was awarded the 2011 Forward National Literature Award (Second Place, General Fiction). In 2013, she won the Artistine Mann Award in Creative Non-Fiction. She was also selected by Salman Rushdie for his Master Class in Creative Writing. Her novella Ricochet was published in June 2013.

Her recent literary work explores narrative medicine. She received first place in the 2016 national Gold – Hope Tang, MD Humanism in Medicine Essay Contest. She has published more than fifty essays, and her essays have been published in some of the most widely recognized medical journals such as The Lancet Psychiatry and Annals of Internal Medicine.

In 2020, while finishing her residency training and beginning work as a hospitalist on the front lines of the coronavirus pandemic, she collaborated with a physician colleague to raise over $8,000 in one week to support the Nashville VA environmental services staff. This served as a launching point for the From Two Doctors project with a goal to share the stories of those who have been impacted by the pandemic. The project won a grant from the "Vessi Community Fund" in addition to receiving sponsorships from many national companies.
