= GES-2 (Moscow) =

Decommissioned Russian power station

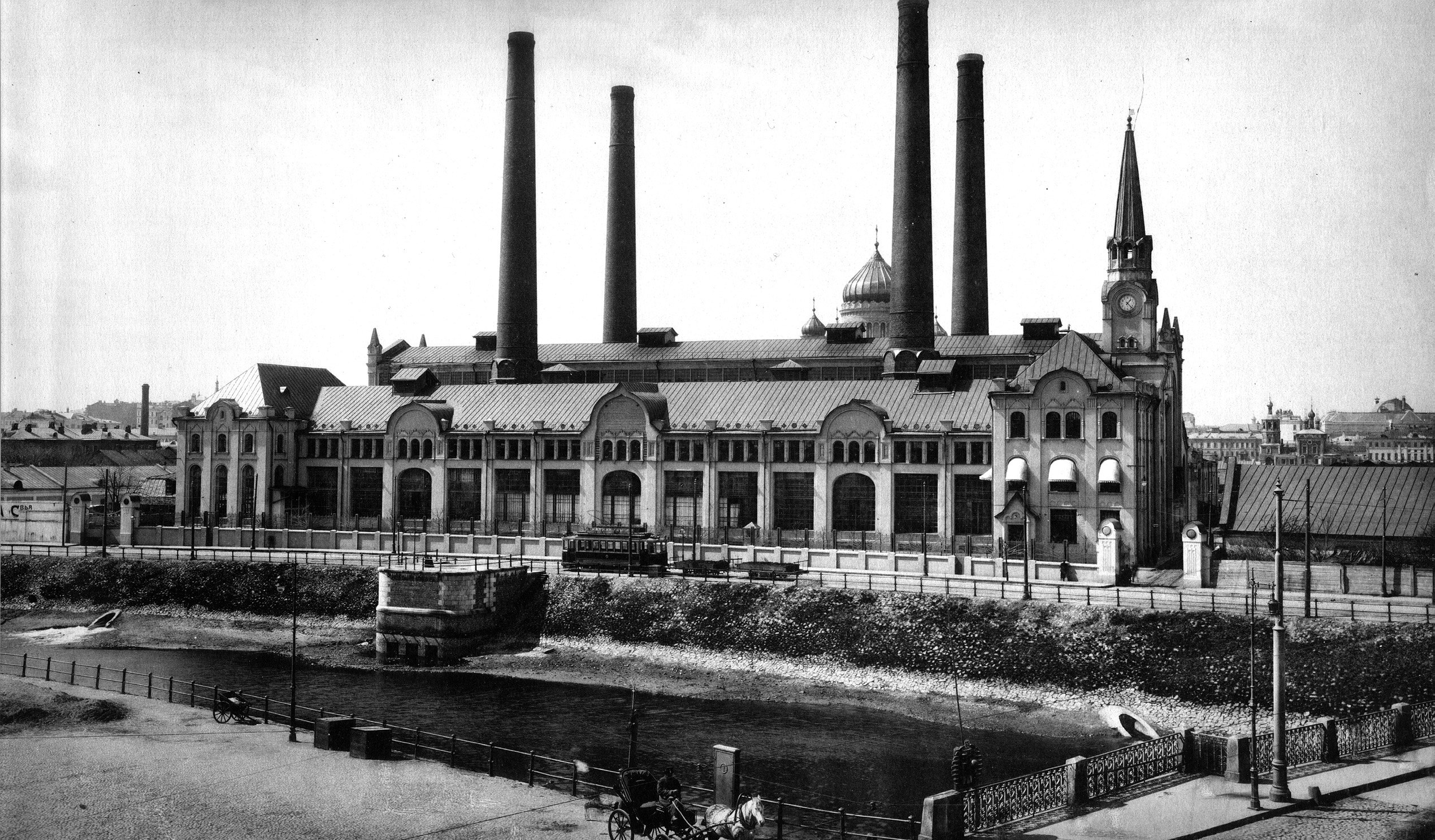
- GES-2 in 1913
- Country: Russia
- Location: Moscow
- Coordinates: 55°44′34″N 37°36′45.9″E
- Status: Decommissioned
- Construction began: September 25, 1904
- Commission date: February 2, 1907
- Decommission date: August 2014
- Owner: V-A-C Foundation

Thermal power station
- Primary fuel: Petroleum
- Secondary fuel: Coal
- Tertiary fuel: Natural gas

Power generation
- Units decommissioned: 3

External links
- Commons: Related media on Commons

GES-2 (Russian: ГЭС-2), also known as MGES-2 and Tramvaynaya (Russian: Трамвайная, or Tram power station) – is a decommissioned power station on the Bolotnaya Embankment, in the Yakimanka District of Moscow. Originally launched in 1907, it was the second major power station built in Moscow. GES-2 operated from 1907 to 2014. After its closure, GES-2 was sold to the V-A-C Foundation, who initiated a restoration and renovation project to convert the main building and surrounding area into a new cultural venue for the city of Moscow. GES-2 is being redesigned by Renzo Piano Building Workshop.

== History ==
=== Russian Empire ===
Built between 1904 and 1907, GES-2 was originally called Tramvaynaya (Russian: Трамвайная, or Tram power station) as it was built to power the city tram system. It was the second major power station built in Moscow.

The first Moscow tramline appeared in 1889, having replaced the horse-drawn city railway.

At the end of the XIX century, the development of the Moscow Public transport system was initiated by two private companies: the First Society of Horse-drawn Railways and the Belgian Joint Stock Company, and electricity for the first tramlines was also supplied by the Raushskaya Power Plant, owned by the 1886 Electric Lighting Joint Stock Company. At the beginning of the 20th century, the Moscow authorities adopted a policy to reduce the role of private capital in the field of public transport and between 1901 and 1909 they bought back the entire property of both transport companies. By 1904, parallel with the signing of a 4-year contract with the 1886 Electric Lighting Joint Stock Company, the city had built a new power plant specifically for electric public transport in Verkhnie Sadovniki.

The site for the construction of the Tram Power Station was assigned from the land of the State Wine and Salt Yard where, in the 1880s, engineer Pavel Yablochkov planned to build a power plant to illuminate the Cathedral of Christ the Saviour. This location provided a convenient water supply from the Vodootvodny Canal and saved the State money on laying cables due to its proximity to the busiest tram unit on Lubyanka in the Lubyanskaya Sloboda.

The facility was designed in the Russian Revival style by the architect Vasili Bashkirov, a graduate of the Moscow School of Painting, Sculpture and Architecture and the Imperial Academy of Arts. The engineering team included Mikhail Polivanov, the Head of the Station, and Nikolay Sushkin, assisted by Vladimir Shukhov. Construction began in the summer-autumn of 1904 and the station was scheduled to be put into operation in 1906 but the completion of the work had to be postponed due to the strikes of 1905.

On February 2, 1907, in the presence of the Mayor Nikolai Guchkov, members of the Administration the members of the City Duma, a service was held in the engine room, where the steam turbines and the first station line-up were blessed by a priest. The commissioning of all putting all station equipment into operation was however still tied to the end of the contract with the 1886 Electric Lighting Joint Stock Company and expansion plans of the tram network continued until 1910. The city treasury spent 2.1 million rubles on the construction and instrumentation of the Tram Power Station. It was equipped with W. Fitzner & Co. steam boilers, Brown, Boveri & Cie turbines, Westinghouse Electric transformers. The boilers ran on oil, supplied through a pipeline from the depository near the Simonov Monastery. In 1910–1912 and 1917, additional equipment was installed in the station, which doubled its capacity. The station powered the Lubyanka, Krasnoprudnaya, Miusskaya and Sokolnicheskaya substations.

=== USSR and the Russian Federation ===
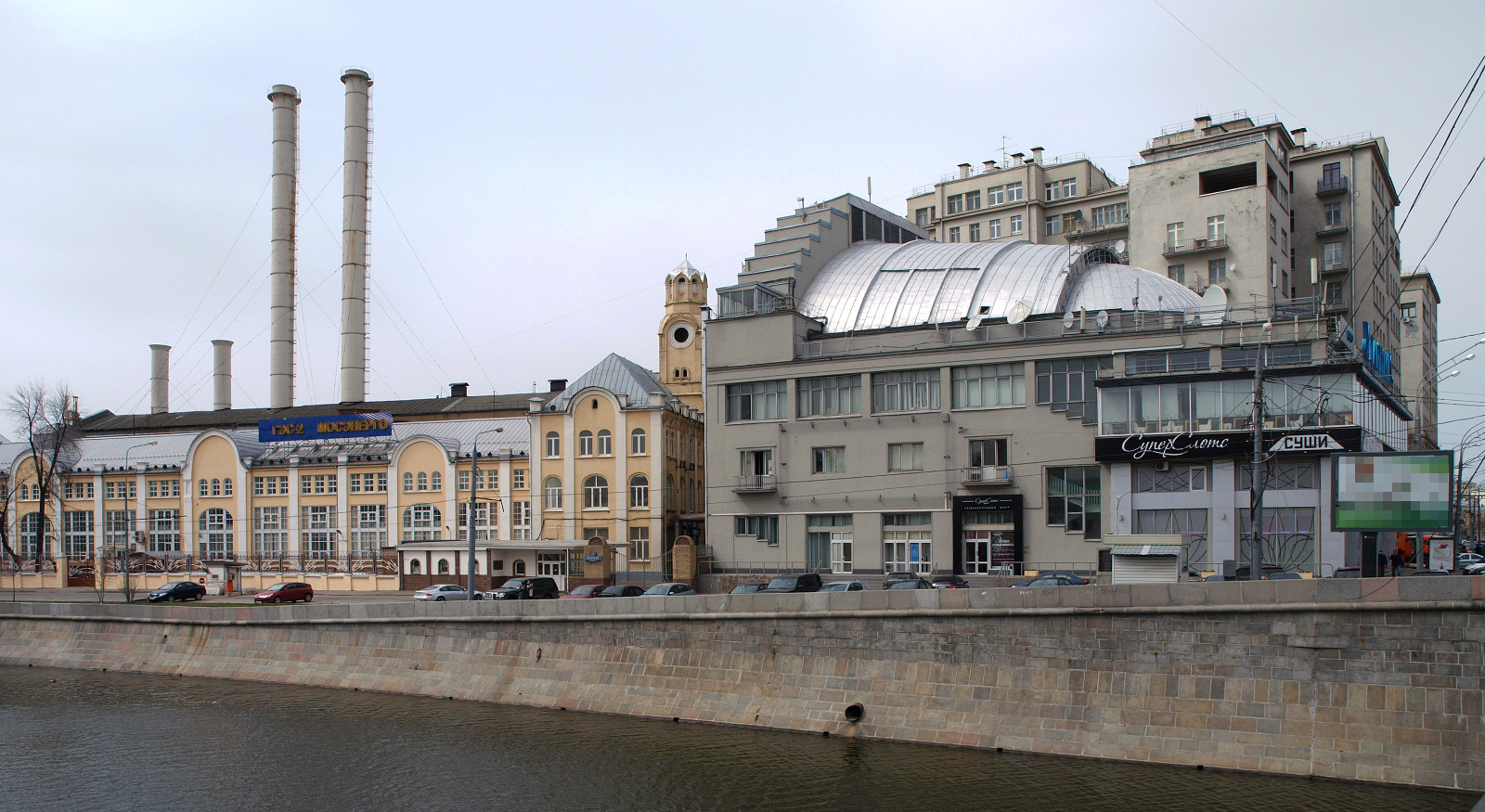
GES-2 in 2009

Following the 1917 February Revolution, a factory committee was established at the Tram Station, after station representatives joined the Military Revolutionary Committee of the Zamoskvoretsky District. During the time of conflict between the Bolsheviks and the supporters of the Provisional government, the Committee took control of the station, the clock tower became a machine gun guarded tower and the tramline was used by the Red Army for a constant supply of ammunition and the transportation of their men around the city. After the October Revolution, the Tram Power Plant was placed under the authority of the Moscow Soviet Workers' and Red Army Deputies, and in September 1921, together with eight other power stations, became a member of the Office of United State Power Plants of the Moscow Region (OGES), under the Glavelectro Board. During this time the output decreased three times from 68 million kWh in 1916.

In January 1922, the Tram Power Plant was turned over to the command of the Moscow Association of State Electric Power Stations (MOGES), established by a decree of the Presidium of the Supreme Council of National Economy. In 1925, the Raushskaya Power Plant was renamed Mosenergo GES-1, and the Tram power plant into Mosenergo GES-2. By that time the station had become less important for the tram network, since a bulk of the energy was sent through the MOGES general network.

In 1925, the boilers at GES-2 were converted to coal for the purpose of saving oil, in the late 1920s and early 1930s the station was reconstructed and modernised in accordance with the first five-year plan. After the completion of the construction of the First House of Councils of the Central Election Commission in 1931, one of the small boilers at GES-2 was redesigned to provide steam for the station laundry house, and was also used to heat the House on the Embankment.

During World War II, about 100 employees from GES-2 went to the frontline, to the militia and partisan detachments, only half returned. In 1941 and 1942 several station boilers were dismantled and sent for installation into the eastern regions of the country, the GES-2 machines were used in the development of military products. During fuel shortages, five boilers were converted to firewood, tramway rails were laid in the courtyard of the station to transport firewood, and an open heat pipeline was constructed leading from GES-1 to GES-2 to heat key facilities. During the war, 7 high-explosive shells and 153 bombs fell on the station, but no damage was done, thanks to the vigilance of the security guards.

After the war, with the beginning of natural gas deliveries through the Saratov-Moscow gas pipeline, the boiler-houses of GES-1 and GES-2 were converted to natural gas with the possibility of using fuel oil as a reserve fuel. In 1956, in order to simplify the administrative structure the stations were merged and ran under the same management, workshop supervisors and duty engineers, and GES-1 became a branch of GES-2. The station was last modernised under Soviet rule in 1965, when the boilers installed in 1907 were replaced. And, it was not refurbished again until 1991–1995, with the replacement of the transformers, turbo-generators and boilers. In 1996–2005, new treatment facilities and fuel oil facilities were launched, silencers were installed and the boilers were transferred to a mixture of water and chelamine. Nevertheless, due to general wear and tear and the high cost of the electricity produced, in 2006 the city authorities decided to close GES-2.

== Architecture ==
The tram power station is located on Bolotnaya Embankment and the long façade of the Engine Room overlooks the Moskva River channel. The building is a simple, airy structure, characterised by wide windows designed in the Russian Revival, typical of Vasily Bashkirov's last works – the facade of the Tretyakov Gallery made according to the sketches of Viktor Vasnetsov and Ivan Tsvetkov's private gallery on the Prechistenskaya embankment. The boiler house building which resembles a basilica, the front facade of which is underlined by a spacious arch, adjoins the engine room. Its roof was originally finished with a clock tower with a tent-shaped top, like that of the Spassky Tower of the Moscow Kremlin. In the early 30s, when a famous House on the Embankment was completed, the top of the clock tower was dismantled. In 1941, another historic element was lost. The station's giant brick pipes (over 60 meters tall) were dismantled over fears that the Germans would use them as a reference point in the air raids, and changed to steel pipes.

== Renovation ==
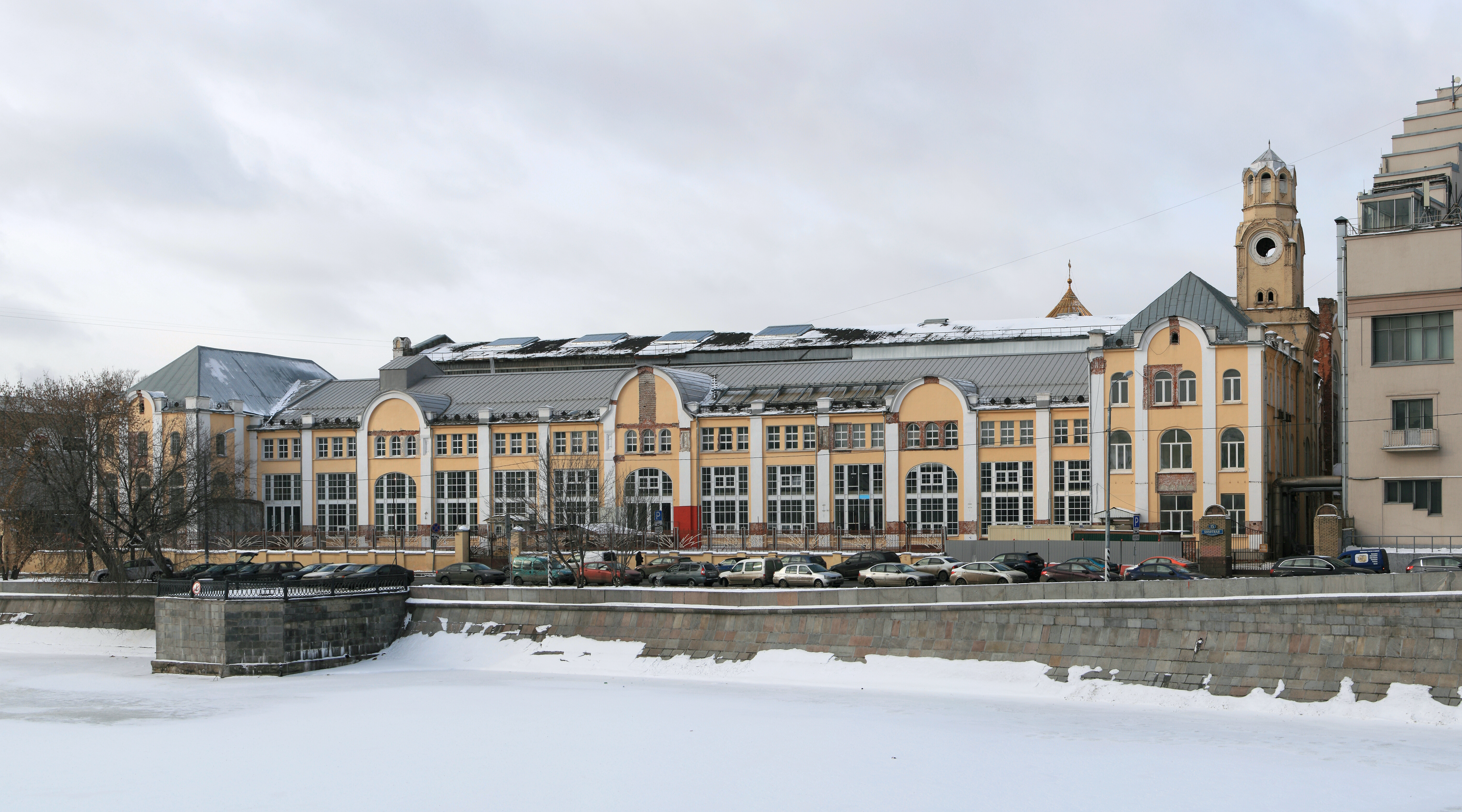
GES-2 in 2017

In November 2009, GES-2 was officially listed as an object of cultural heritage having regional importance. In 2014, the then Head of the Department of Culture of Moscow, Sergey Kapkov invited collector and arts patron Leonid Mikhelson, who at the time was looking for a permanent home in Moscow for the V-A-C Foundation, to acquire the building.

In September 2015, V-A-C presented its first exhibition project inside an area of GES-2, called Expanding Space. Artistic Practice in the Urban Environment. In October 2015, it was announced that V-A-C Foundation had commissioned Renzo Piano Building Workshop (RPBW) to redesign the GES-2 power station and the surrounding grounds.

The RPBW project organises the site into three main areas: the welcoming pole will feature an outdoor sculpture area, library, bookshop, café, auditorium and permanent exhibitions space, the exhibitions pole will host main galleries and the education pole will host summer school and an artist residency block. A piazza in front of the main southeast entrance will lead into an inner "street", while the landscape in the western part will include a park with hundreds of birch trees. It will occupy 20,000 square meters. Having applied for LEED certification, the new centre will have a high level of energy-efficient sustainability via the use of solar panels and the extraction of clean air to ventilate the building as well as the collection of rainwater for cleaning purposes.

In March 2017, V-A-C Foundation hosted Geometry of Now, a week-long free art and sound festival within the raw, emptied spaces of GES-2. Curated by multidisciplinary artist Mark Fell, the project featured some 50 Russian and international artists and musicians. In February 2019, it was announced that the launch of GES-2 will be in 2020.

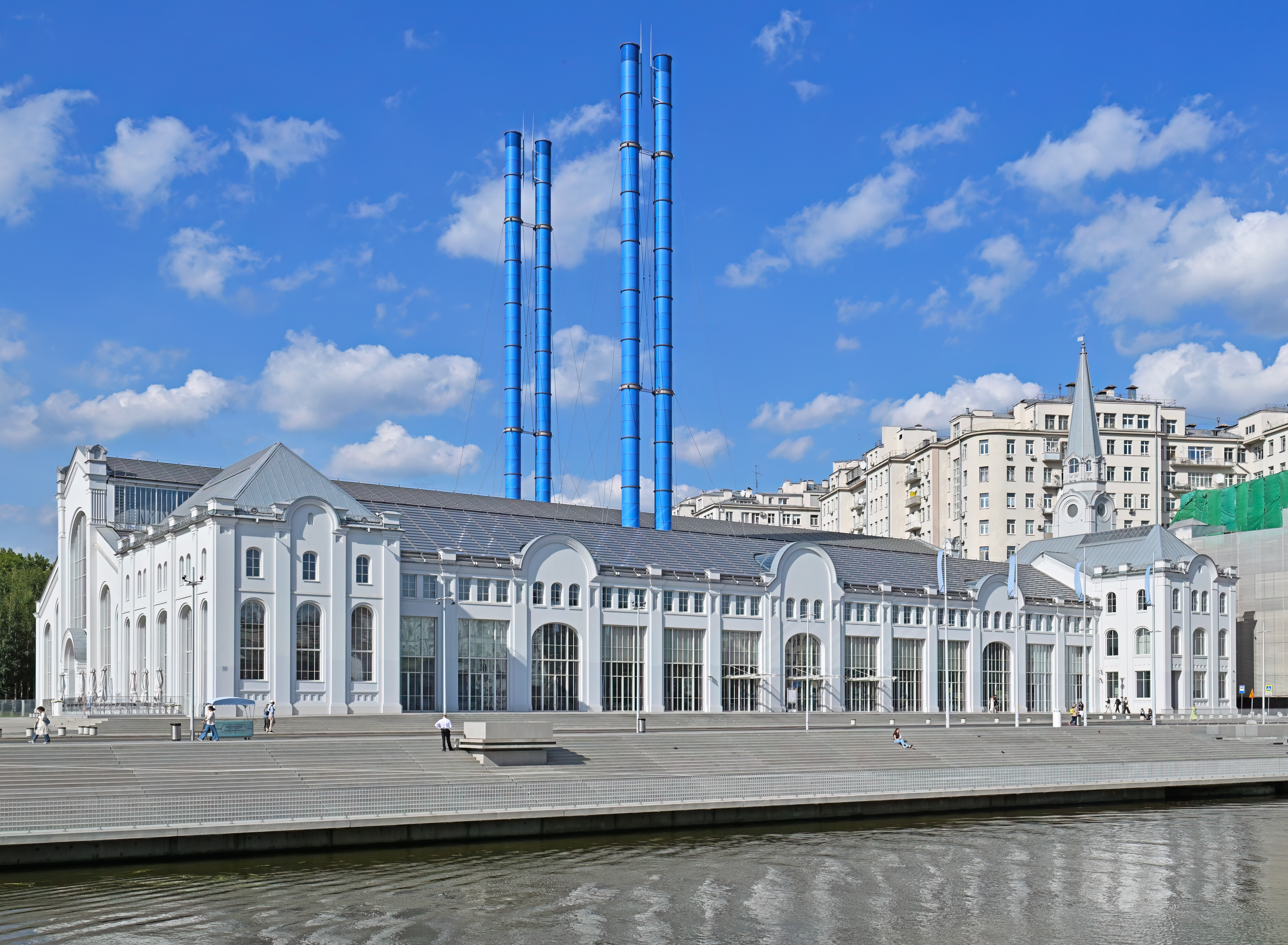
GES-2 in September 2025

== Bibliography ==
- Арсеньев, Борис (2014). Неисчерпаемая Якиманка. В центре Москвы – в сердцевине истории [Inexhaustible Yakimanka. In the center of Moscow – at the heart of history] (in Russian). Центрполиграф. ISBN 978-5-227-05087-8 – via Google Books.
- Симонов, Николай (2016). Развитие электроэнергетики Российской империи: предыстория ГОЭЛРО [The development of the electric power industry of the Russian Empire: the background of GOELRO] (in Russian). Университет Дмитрия Пожарского. p. 265. ISBN 978-5-91244-175-2 – via Google Books.
