= Izmaylovsky (rural locality) =

Village in Chelyabinsk Oblast, Russia

Izmailovsky Измайловский
- Rural locality
- Interactive map of Izmailovsky
- Location of Izmailovsky Izmailovsky (Russia)
- Coordinates: 52°39′41″N 59°18′34″E
- Country: Russia
- Federal subject: Chelyabinsk Oblast
- Founded: 1842

Population
  - Estimate (2021): 1,127 )
- Time zone: UTC+5 (MSK+2)
- Postal code: 457619
- OKTMO ID: 75632440101

Izmaylovsky (Russian: Измайловский) is a rural locality (a village) in Kizilsky District, Chelyabinsk Oblast, in the Asian part of Russia. It has a population of 1,221 (2010 census);

== History ==
The settlement was founded in 1842, and named after the city of Izmail, to commemorate its capture by the Russians in 1790.

== Demographics ==
Distribution of the population by ethnicity according to the 2021 census:

	percent
Russians	65.75%
Bashkirs	14.11%
Kazakhs	12.51%
Tatars	3.46%
Tajiks	1.77%
Georgians	0.35%
Udmurts	0.27%
Refused answer, no nationality or no information	0.62%
