= Chernorechensky =

Chernorechensky Чернореченский
- Khutor
- Location within Volgograd Oblast Location within Russia
- Coordinates: 50°35′N 44°04′E
- Country: Russia
- Region: Volgograd Oblast
- District: Danilovsky District
- Time zone: UTC+4:00

Chernorechensky (Russian: Чернореченский) is a rural locality (a khutor) in Beloprudskoye Rural Settlement, Danilovsky District, Volgograd Oblast, Russia. The population was 45 as of 2010.

== Geography ==
Chernorechensky is located in steppe, 51 km north of Danilovka (the district's administrative centre) by road. Belye Prudy is the nearest rural locality.
