= Yaşar İsmailoğlu =

Yasar İsmailoğlu (born 1945 in Limassol, Cyprus) is a Turkish-Cypriot poet, writer and journalist who emigrated to London in 1972 after the 1971 military coup in Turkey. İsmailoğlu writes in Turkish and English.

== Poetry ==
- The Barbarian. 1965.
- The Daughter of Steps (Step Kızı). 1968.
- Cyprus I Loved You So. 1980.
- Yarımın Acısı (Anguish of my half). 1995.
- The Pain of my Other Part/Why Aphrodite Why? 1995.
- To Whom I Could Die (Oyy Sevdasına Kurban Olduğum). 1997.
- Uzaklaşan Sesler. 2000.
- Ayisigi Golgesinde Erosa Yolculuk. London: Siirler, 2004. ISBN 0952541572
