= Edin Smajić =

Bosnian footballer

Personal information
- Date of birth: 30 August 1971 (age 55)
- Place of birth: Donji Vakuf, SFR Yugoslavia
- Position: Midfielder

Senior career*
Years	Team	Apps	(Gls)
1995–1998	Čelik Zenica	56	(2)
1998–2002	Iskra Bugojno	103	(10)
2003–2007	Travnik	86	(1)
2007–2008	Iskra Bugojno		
2008–2011	Krajina Cazin		
2011–2012	Iskra Bugojno		

International career^{‡}
1997–1999	Bosnia and Herzegovina	4	(0)
- * Club domestic league appearances and goals ‡ National team caps and goals as of 24 June 2021

Edin Smajić (born 30 August 1971) is a Bosnian retired football player.

== Club career ==
He won the 1995–96 Bosnia and Herzegovina Football Cup with Čelik Zenica.

== International career ==
Smajić made his debut for Bosnia and Herzegovina in a November 1997 friendly match away against Tunisia and has earned a total of 4 caps, scoring no goals. His final international was a June 1999 European Championship qualification match against the Faroe Islands.
