= Kabir Smajić =

Bosnian footballer

Personal information
- Date of birth: 30 May 1977 (age 49)
- Place of birth: Banovići, SFR Yugoslavia
- Height: 1.85 m (6 ft 1 in)
- Position: Midfielder

Senior career*
Years	Team	Apps	(Gls)
2000–2001	Sloboda Tuzla		
2001	Saturn Ramenskoye	2	(0)
2001–2002	Jedinstvo Bihać		
2002–2008	Budućnost Banovići	25+	(2+)
2008–2009	Bratstvo Gračanica		
2009–2012	Budućnost Banovići	13+	(0+)
2012–2013	Priluk		
- * Club domestic league appearances and goals

Kabir Smajić (born 30 May 1977 in Banovići) is a Bosnian retired football player.
