= Adil Ismayilov =

Azerbaijani lawyer, jurist, investigator, and public figure (1957–2020)

- Adil Əlviz oğlu İsmayılov
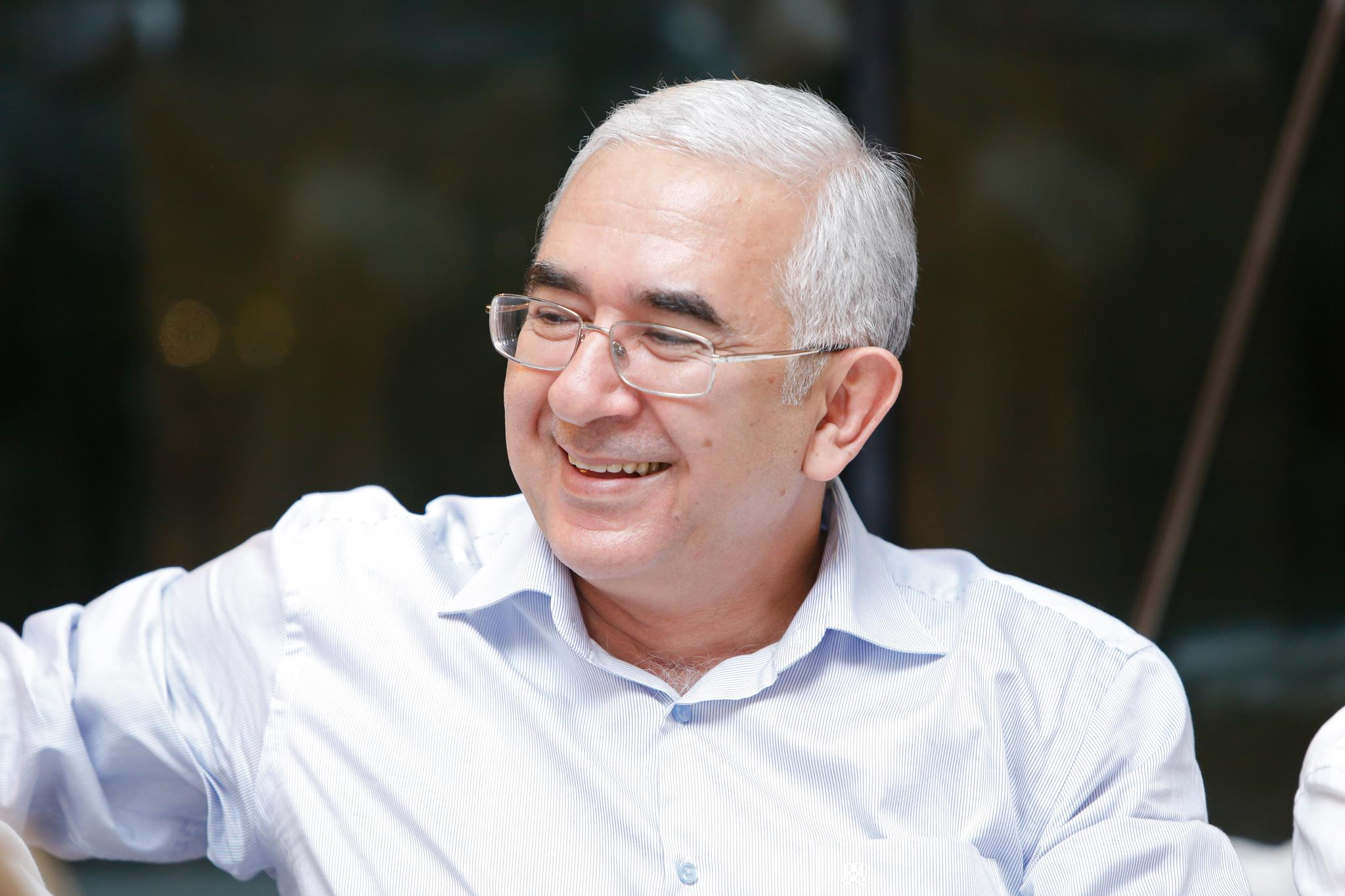
- Ismayilov in 2013
- Born: Adil Alviz oglu Ismayilov; July 5, 1957; Goychay, Goychay District, Azerbaijani SSR, Soviet Union
- Died: December 3, 2020 (aged 63); Baku, Azerbaijan
- Citizenship: Soviet Union (1957–1991); Azerbaijan (1991–2020)
- Education: Azerbaijani State University
- Occupations: lawyer, jurist, investigator
- Years active: 1978–2020
- Board member of: Azerbaijani Bar Association
- Children: 2

Adil Alviz oglu Ismayilov (Azerbaijani: Adil Əlviz oğlu İsmayılov; 5 July 1957 – 3 December 2020) was an Azerbaijani lawyer, jurist, investigator, and a public figure.

A member of the Azerbaijani Bar Association, Ismayilov participated in the most well-known trials in Azerbaijan during the 1990s and 2000s.

== Life ==
Adil Alviz oglu Ismayilov was born on 5 July 1957, in Goychay, the administrative center of Goychay District in the Azerbaijani SSR, which at the time was part of the Soviet Union. He studied at the secondary school No. 172 named after Suleyman Sani Akhundov in Baku. From 1973 to 1978, he studied at the Faculty of Law of the Azerbaijani State University.

Ismayilov spoke Azerbaijani language, Russian and French. He had two children: Ismayil and Mikayil.

== Career ==
Adil Ismayilov started his career in 1978 in a local prosecutor's offices. He worked as a chief investigator in the Sumgayit City Prosecutor's Office, and then in 1983 as an investigator on important cases in the Prosecutor General's Office. After the August Coup, in September 1991, at his own request, he left the prosecutor's office and began working as a private lawyer, believing that the following events will result in Azerbaijan's independence and a democratic society will be built in the country. Desiring to change the system, he criticized the situation in the Soviet prosecutor's office and the shortcomings in the system via Azadliq, an anti-Soviet newspaper. At that time, Ismayilov was in contact with the opposition Popular Front Party of Azerbaijan, and met with the chairman of the party, Abulfaz Elchibey several times, who would later become Azerbaijan's president. In 1995, he founded the law firm "ADISAD".

As a lawyer, Ismayilov had participated in a number of well-known lawsuits. He was active during the 1993 Azerbaijani coup d'état, becoming a lawyer for Isa Gambar, the ex-acting President of Azerbaijan who was arrested the same year, and former minister of internal affairs, Isgandar Hamidov. Ismayilov also wrote a book titled Legal Absurdities in 2008. In the book, he comments on the gaps and some contradictions in the Criminal Code of Azerbaijan. In 2005, he defended General Zakir Nasirov during the Operation Black Belt, in 2006, Ramil Safarov, an Azerbaijani serviceman arrested in Hungary for killing an Armenian lieutenant, and in 2015, General Subahir Gurbanov, during the MNS case. In his last case, he was the lawyer of the former Prosecutor General of Azerbaijan Eldar Hasanov. The law firm he worked for was Humbatov and Partners.

In September 2019, lawyer Sahil Guliyev filed a complaint to the Azerbaijan Bar Association against Ismayilov for him using the term "slave" to describe some of the lawyers in his Facebook post. On 9 September, the board decided to suspend Ismayilov's advocacy for one year, but this decision was overturned on 24 September.

== Death ==
Ismayilov died from complications related to COVID-19 on 3 December 2020, during the COVID-19 pandemic in Azerbaijan.
