= Russian Abstract Art Foundation =

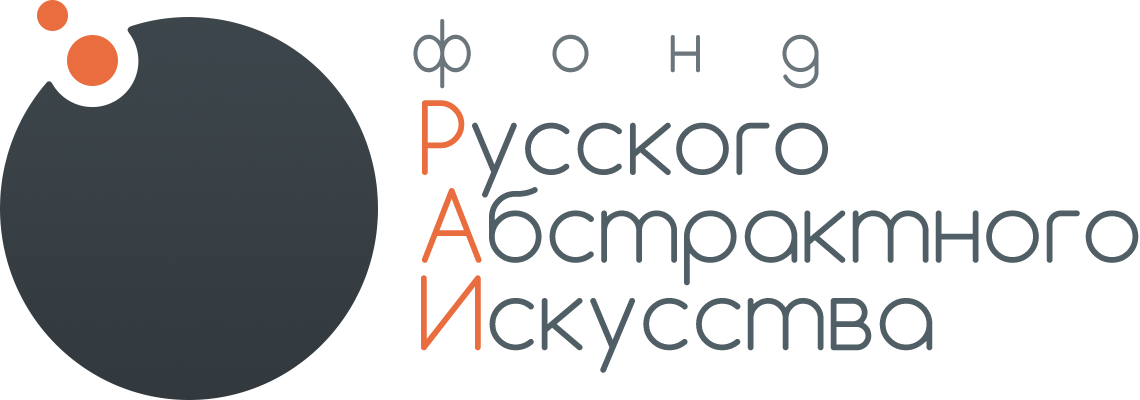

Russian Abstract Art Foundation is a noncommercial organization, formed for supporting cultural, educational and social initiatives. The Foundation’s mission is to form correct academic and historical understanding of Russian abstract art in the global context.

== Collection ==
The collection of the Foundation is based on creative work by members of The New Reality artistic group, as well as on vast archival material, connected with their art, the Foundation aims at defining and demonstrating the place of this group in particular, and Russian abstraction in general, in the evolvement line of history of art. Foundation is focusing on the artists, who were attending Studio for a long time and formed the very core of it, such as Ely Beliutin, Vladislav Zubarev, Lutsian Gribkov, Vera Preobrazhenskaya, Tamara Ter-Gevondyan, Anatoly Safokhin, Svetlana Nekrasova, Elena Radkevich, Alexander Krukov. The New Reality Studio was a group of abstract artists, it emerged at end the 1950s and had been existing until the death of their leader Ely Beliutin in 2012. Their aim was the revival and natural development of the Russian avant-garde and abstract art of 1920s. Abstract art, having started with works by Wassily Kandinsky, did not get development in Russia, and for almost 30 years was excluded from professional vocabulary, but, in spite of this, gained a powerful momentum in the West. Works by Wassily Kandinsky, Kazimir Malevich, Larionov, Lisitsky, Alexander Rodchenko illustrate these artists’ unique experiments with color, shape, space, but, first and foremost, they vividly reflected changing social identities, that is, fulfilled the main purpose of art.

Ely Bielutin made it his mission to create truly contemporary art, and as a result of his activities, aspired to found a new Academy of Arts. This makes members of his group followers of the early 20th century masters not only from the formal-stylistic point of view, but ideologically as well. That is why their intellectual and creative heritage is indispensable for understanding evolvement of any innovative idea in art.

== Foundation’s Mission ==
Studies of the system of interaction with artists, devised by Ely Bielutin and his disciple Vladislav Zubarev, and analysis of Bielutin’s theory of common ability to contact and Zubarev’s theory of temporal art demonstrated that these methods are universal and can be used working with people of various occupations, not only of creative professions. The Foundation developed an educational program based on these theories that includes lectures and workshops, and is being prepared for introduction into Russian higher education institutions.

To realize its goals the Foundation plans to engage into intensive educational activities, including cooperation with Russian and foreign non-profit and academic organizations, public-owned and private museums.

The Foundation’s activities are not limited to collaborating with acknowledged masters, but are oriented towards engaging young artists who dedicate their art to current issues and search for new creative forms. The second goal of the Foundation is to adapt and integrate new methods into educational process in order to help develop original creative thinking in students.

== Literature ==
1.Е. Асеева. Послевоенное абстрактное искусство в России. Диссертация.

2.Лариса Кашук. Абстрактное искусство Москвы 1950-х - 2000 годов.

3. Миссия Фонда русского абстрактного искусства

4. Абстракция в России. XX век. Государственный русский музей, 2001 ISBN 5-93332-059-5

5. Другое искусство. Москва 1956-1988. М., 2005 ISBN 594-6-2001-51

6. Белютин Э. М. Искусство в тебе. М., 2009.

7. Андреева Е. Угол несоответствия. Школы нон-конформизма. Москва-Ленинград. 1946-1991. Спб.,2012 ISBN 978-5-98051-100-5

8. От "оттепели" до миллениума. Москва, 2013.

== Press ==
- В поисках новой реальности: школа Белютина. Ольга Ускова. Журнал Сноб. 08-03-14
- В поисках новой реальности: школа Белютина. Часть вторая. Журнал Сноб.
- Готовность к битве интеллектов. Ольга Ускова. Известия. 20-03-2013
- Эйнштейнов станет больше. Вузы будут развивать творческий потенциал студентов. Евгения Мамонова. Российская газета. 30-04-2013
- Столичных студентов научат мыслить творчески. Антон Размахнин. Вечерняя Москва. 23-07-2013
- Решайте рисуя. Россия научится мыслить креативно. Наталья Барановская. Российская газета. 23-03-2013
- Ученые нашли способ выращивать гениев на работе. О пользе Теории всеобщей контактности. Наталья Веденеева. МК. 14-05-2013
- Селигер рисовал под дождем.
