= Izmaylovsky (inhabited locality) =

Izmaylovsky (Russian: Измайловский; masculine), Izmaylovskaya (Измайловская; feminine), or Izmaylovskoye (Измайловское; neuter) is the name of several rural localities in Russia.

== Modern localities ==
- Izmaylovsky (rural locality), a settlement in Izmaylovsky Selsoviet of Kizilsky District in Chelyabinsk Oblast
- Izmaylovskaya (rural locality), a village in Kenoretsky Selsoviet of Plesetsky District in Arkhangelsk Oblast

== Alternative names ==
- Izmaylovsky, alternative name of Izmaylovka, a village in Sorochinsky Rural Okrug of Kalachinsky District in Omsk Oblast; 55°16′N 74°52′E
- Izmaylovsky, alternative name of Izmaylov, a khutor in Verkhnekubansky Rural Okrug of Novokubansky District in Krasnodar Krai; 45°0′N 40°55′E
