= Tolekan Ismailova =

- Occupation: Human rights defender

Tolekan Asanalievna Ismailova (Kyrgyz: Төлөкан Асаналиевна Исмаилова; born 17 June 1954) is a Kyrgyz human rights defender and director of Bir Duino Kyrgyzstan (formerly known as Citizens Against Corruption) since May 2000, the Executive Secretary of the Kyrgyzstan NGOs Forum and founding president of Kyrgyzstan's Coalition for Democracy and Civil Society.

== Early life ==
Ismailova was born in the Northern Tien Shan Mountains in Eastern Kyrgyzstan. Her father was a Kyrgyz language and literature teacher and a World War II Veteran. Ismailova holds a degree in foreign languages from the Kyrgyz National University.

== Career ==
As founder and President of the Coalition for Democracy and Civil Society, Ismailova played a role in uniting the NGO sector of Kyrgyzstan. In 2003, Ismailova was selected as a Reagan Fascell Democracy Program Fellow by the National Endowment for Democracy.

In 2007, Ismailova was arrested for her participation in a national campaign called “I don’t believe,” which protested the inconsistencies in the 2007 Parliamentary election.

As the director for Bir Duino Kyrgyzstan, meaning “One World,” Ismailova holds an annual human rights documentary film festival. In 2012, its sixth festival had nationwide controversy over a documentary about homosexuality and Islam in Morocco called I Am Gay and Muslim. A court banned its screening at the festival. Although Ismailova appealed the ban, it was unsuccessful. She also complained that two days before the scheduled screening, the State Committee on Homeland Security had acted illegally forcing her to hand over a copy of the film. After the screening, Ismailova and her family were labeled as “extremists and promoters of inter-ethnic and inter-religious conflicts” by the central intelligence agencies.

Former Kyrgyz president Almazbek Atambayev accused Ismailova of working to overthrow his government using support from foreign secret services. Ismailova and fellow activist Aziza Abdirasulova filed a court case against the government and requested an official apology. The apology was never granted.

At 10:00 KGT on 13 March 2026, Ismailova and fellow activist Bermet Borubaeva, alongside filmmaker Bulat Satarkulov, were arrested in Bishkek while travelling to a planned peaceful protest in the Pervomaiskii district against the government's ban on freedom of assembly with signs reading "Right to Peaceful Assembly" (Russian: Право на свободу мирных собраний, romanized: Pravo na svobodu mirnykh sobraniy). Borubaeva was arrested despite it being alleged that the Kyrgyz authorities only had summons papers for Ismailova. After being detained for six hours at the Main Department of Internal Affairs of Bishkek, all three were released.
