= Leonid Mikhelson =

Russian businessman

- Леонид Михельсон
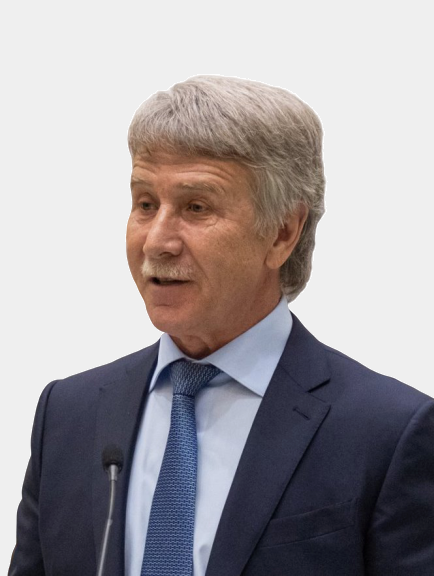
- Mikhelson in 2020
- Born: 11 August 1955 (age 71); Kaspiysk, Russian SFSR
- Citizenship: Russia; Israel
- Education: Kuibyshev Civil Engineering Institute BEng Master of Engineering
- Occupation: Businessman
- Known for: Major Shareholder of Novatek; Richest Person in Russia
- Title: Chairman & CEO, Novatek
- Spouse: Married
- Children: 2

Leonid Viktorovich Mikhelson (Russian: Леони́д Ви́кторович Михельсо́н; born 11 August 1955) is a Russian-Israeli billionaire oligarch, businessman, CEO, chairman and major shareholder of the Russian gas company Novatek.

After the collapse of the Soviet Union, Mikhelson obtained a stake in a privatized pipeline construction company out of which he formed Novatek. He is a business partner of Russian billionaire Gennady Timchenko, a close confidante of Russian leader Vladimir Putin.

According to the Bloomberg Billionaires Index, Mikhelson had a net worth of US$24.8 billion as of 24 August 2026, making him the 103rd richest person in the world and the second richest in Russia. In the 2026 Forbes annual billionaires ranking, he was ranked 88th in the world and fourth in Russia, with an estimated net worth of US$28.3 billion.

== Biography ==
Born to an Ashkenazi Jewish father and a Russian mother, Mikhelson began his career as an engineer after graduating with a degree in Industrial Civil Engineering from the Samara Institute of Civil Engineering in 1977. He started working as a foreman at a construction and assembling company in the Tyumen area of Siberia. One of his initial projects was work on the Urengoi-Chelyabinsk gas pipeline. In 1985, he was appointed as Chief Engineer of Ryazantruboprovodstroy. In 1987, he became General Director of Kuibishevtruboprovodstroy, which, in 1991, was one of the first companies to undergo privatization after the dissolution of the Soviet Union.

Mikhelson continued as managing director at the company, which has been renamed NOVA, until October 1994. He then became General Director of its holding company, Novafinivest, which later became known as NOVATEK. From 2008 until 2010 Mikhelson was chairman of the board of directors for OAO Stroytransgas and OOO Art Finance. He currently holds the position of chairman of the Board of Directors of ZAO SIBUR and serves on the supervisory board of OAO Russian Regional Development Bank. SIBUR is a gas processing and petrochemicals company operating 26 production sites across Russia with headquarters in Moscow. Mikhelson owns 57.5% interest in Sibur. He also holds a 25% stake in Novatek. He also owns a megayacht, Pacific. He is considered to be one of Russia's oligarchs.

Mikhelson has a strong interest in art, stating that “99 per cent” of his interest is in Russian and contemporary art. He also established his own foundation, the V-A-C Foundation, which promotes contemporary Russian art, and has international ties with the New Museum in New York, the Tate museums in the UK, and London's Whitechapel gallery. In May 2017, the foundation also opened an exhibition space in Venice and work is underway to develop V-A-C's first major art centre in Moscow, whose main site is an historic power station on the banks of the Moskva River. Designed by Renzo Piano Building Workshop, the new centre for contemporary arts and culture in Moscow is due to open in 2021.

== Notable Partnerships ==
Mikhelson often partners with Russian billionaire Gennady Timchenko on business and investment projects. They are partners and majority shareholders in Novatek and Sibur. In 2013, Mikhelson and Timchenko sold 12% of Sibur to management partners. Both Mikhelson and Timchenko appear on the Forbes list of billionaires.

In 2012, he was listed as the second-richest Russian in a number of articles including Bloomberg. Mikhelson and Novatek are the main sponsors of the Russian Football Union.

Mikhelson is a recipient of the Russian Federation's Order of the Badge of Honor.

== Personal life ==
Mikhelson is married, with two children, and lives in Moscow. His daughter Victoria studied art history at New York University and London's Courtauld Institute. His VAC Foundation Victoria, the Art of Being Contemporary, is named after her. Mikhelson also holds Israeli citizenship.

=== Sanctions ===
Mikhelson is one of many Russian "oligarchs" named in the Countering America's Adversaries Through Sanctions Act, CAATSA, signed into law by President Donald Trump in 2017. He was sanctioned by the British government in 2022 in relation to Russo-Ukrainian War.

== Forbes net worth and rankings ==
In the 2026 Forbes ranking, Leonid Mikhelson and his family ranked fourth among Russian billionaires and 88th globally, with an estimated net worth of US$28.3 billion. This represented a decrease of US$100 million from 2025, ending three consecutive annual increases. He returned to fourth place in Russia for the first time since 2023, having ranked second in 2024 and third in 2025. Forbes identified gas and petrochemicals as the sources of his wealth, listing stakes of 24.6% in Novatek and 30.6% in Sibur.

In 2025, Mikhelson and his family fell to third place in Russia despite an increase in their estimated wealth of US$1 billion to US$28.4 billion. Their global ranking remained unchanged at 66th. Forbes continued to list Novatek and Sibur as his principal assets and reported that Novatek's Arctic LNG project had halted production in October 2024 because it could not sell the cargoes already produced.

In 2024, Mikhelson and his family rose from fourth to second place among Russian billionaires and from 73rd to 66th globally. Their estimated net worth increased by US$5.8 billion to US$27.4 billion, exceeding his 2021 valuation of US$24.9 billion. Forbes listed the same stakes in Novatek and Sibur, while noting that US sanctions imposed on the Arctic LNG project in November 2023 had delayed commercial deliveries scheduled for January 2024.

In 2023, Mikhelson retained fourth place in Russia and rose to 73rd globally, with an estimated net worth of US$21.6 billion. The increase of US$7.6 billion from 2022 partially reversed the previous year's decline, although his wealth remained below its 2021 level. Forbes listed his holdings in Novatek and Sibur and noted that, in January 2023, he had transferred a 2.5% stake in Novatek and the GES-2 cultural centre to his daughter Victoria.

In 2022, Mikhelson's estimated net worth fell by US$10.9 billion to US$14 billion. His global ranking dropped from 66th to 130th, although he moved from fifth to fourth place in Russia. Forbes listed stakes of 24.6% in Novatek and 30.6% in Sibur. Its profile also described Sibur's October 2021 merger with the TAIF industrial group, whose shareholders received a 15% stake in Sibur and nearly US$3 billion in company bonds.

In 2021, Mikhelson ranked fifth among Russian billionaires and 66th globally, with an estimated net worth of US$24.9 billion, an increase of US$7.8 billion over the previous year. Forbes attributed his wealth to gas and petrochemicals, listing stakes of 24.03% in Novatek and 35.98% in Sibur. During March and April 2021, he reduced his Sibur holding to that level through two transactions in which Sogaz and a subsidiary each acquired a 6.25% stake previously held through his trusts.

Leonid Mikhelson's Forbes net worth and rankings, 2004–2026
Year	Net worth (US$ billion)	Global rank	Rank in Russia	Change (US$ billion)
2026	28.3	88	4	−0.1
2025	28.4	66	3	+1.0
2024	27.4	66	2	+5.8
2023	21.6	73	4	+7.6
2022	14.0	130	4	−10.9
2021	24.9	66	5	+7.8
2020	17.1	48	3	−6.9
2019	24.0	32	1	+6.0
2018	18.0	64	3	−0.4
2017	18.4	46	1	+4.0
2016	14.4	60	1	+2.7
2015	11.7	105	7	−3.9
2014	15.6	57	5	+0.2
2013	15.4	47	3	+3.5
2012	11.9	72	10	+2.8
2011	9.1	99	15	+4.7
2010	4.4	189	24	+2.0
2009	2.4	285	17	−2.3
2008	4.7	214	27	+0.4
2007	4.3	194	25	+1.8
2006	2.5	292	26	+1.6
2005	0.90	Not ranked	33	+0.45
2004	0.45	Not ranked	54	—

Note: Net worth figures for 2004 and 2005 are from the Russian ranking; subsequent figures are from the global billionaires ranking. Rank in Russia refers to the separate Russian ranking. Annual changes are calculated from the net worth figures shown. A dash indicates that no preceding-year figure is included for comparison.

== See also ==
- List of Russian billionaires
- Energy policy of Russia
