= Osman İşmen =

Turkish conductor, composer and pianist

- Born: 2 August 1952 (age 72); Istanbul, Turkey
- Genres: Jazz; disco; funk; soul; Turkish folk
- Occupations: Conductor; composer; arranger; producer
- Instruments: Piano; musical keyboard
- Years active: 1973–present

Osman İşmen (born 2 August 1952) is a Turkish conductor, composer, pianist, keyboardist, and music arranger.

In 1973, he started his professional music career as a conductor with an orchestra group, and in 1977 he also started working as a music arranger. Together with his orchestra, Osman İşmen performed disco, funk and soul music for a number of years. In 1978, he published his first studio album Diskomatik Kâtibim. After publishing his second album Disco Madımak in 1979, he started collaborating with Kısa Dalga Group and together they released Disco Türkü (1980), Disco Maşallah (1981) and Disco Gencebay. These albums contained re-edited versions of songs in various musical styles. The instrumental works that were performed by Osman İşmen Orchestra in 1987 were later published under the name TRT Ara Müziği.

In 1998, he founded the music group Osman İşmen Project and started making jazz music. In this genre, he released Jazz Eastern (1998), Rakkas (2000), Jazz İstanbul (2003), Jazz Eastern II (2006) and East Inn (2006). In the years that followed, he released the albums Saharians (2009), Romantika (2009), Elektro Klasikler (2009), Saz ve Jazz Eserleri (2009), Modern Oyun Havaları (2009), Lounge with Our Golden Songs (2009), Guitar & Bouzouki Plays 10 Hot Hits (2009), Senfonik Rock Türkülerimiz, Vol. 01 (2013, with Allegra Quartet) and Tangopera (2014, with Allegra Quartet). Işmen has also worked as an arranger and composer for various other artists.

== Early life ==
He was born on 2 August 1952 in Istanbul, to parents who both were civil servants. At the age of 6, he started learning classic piano. He studied at Mecidiyeköy High School. In 1965, he found the orchestra group Grup Senkop. The group won the Amateur Communities Competition organized by the Diskotek in May 1968, together with the Istanbul High School. He graduated from Istanbul University Faculty of Business Administration in 1973.

== Career ==
Following his graduation, he started to perform live and accompanied various artists, eventually founding Ritim 93 Orchestra in the same year. In 1976, he served as conscript officer for 3.5 months in İskenderun. During his military service, İşmen met Ali Kocatepe who "brought him into the music world". In 1977, he started working as a music arranger.

Together with his orchestra group Osman İşmen Orchestra, he published his first studio album Diskomatik Kâtibim in 1978 under the label Beta Müzik. The album received a Music Oscar award from Hey magazine in the year it was published. It was followed by Disco Madımak, which was published by Yonca Plak in 1979. The instrumental songs in the second album were used in the soundtrack of a number of Turkish comedy films at the time. In 1980, he collaborated with Kısa Dalga Group, and their album, which was a mix of Turkish folk music and disco music, was published under the title Disco Türkü by Yonca Plak. In the same year, he ended his stage career and started doing studio works only. For his 1981 album, Disco Maşallah, which was published by Yaşar Kekeva Plak, Osman İşmen Orchestra and Kısa Dalga Group came together. In the same year, Kervan Plak published his other album Disco Gencebay, on which Orhan Gencebay worked as a keyboardist and Kısa Dalga Group performed the songs. In 1987, his instrumental songs with Osman İşmen Orchestra were published under the title TRT Ara Müziği by Oskar Plak.

In 1998, he founded the group Osman İşmen Project, with whom he worked on classic Turkish and jazz music, and the songs were published in the album Jazz Eastern. In 2000, Bonus Müzik published his album Rakkas. He continued working on jazz music and in 2003 Universal published the album Jazz İstanbul, which included songs that were both composed and arranged by him. In 2006, DMC released his new jazz albums Jazz Eastern II and East Inn. In 2009, Ares Müzik released Saharians. In the same year, Âti Müzik published his instrumental songs in a number of different albums: Elektro Klasikler, Modern Oyun Havaları, Romantika and Saz ve Jazz Eserleri. Two more albums, Lounge with Our Golden Songs and Guitar & Bouzouki Plays 10 Hot Hits, were later published by Şafakaraman Production. In 2013, Fono Müzik published his new album Senfonik Rock Türkülerimiz, Vol. 01, which contained new versions of his Turkish folk songs, and Allegra Quartet collaborated with him on it. He later worked with Allegra Quartet again, and their album, Tangopera, was released in 2014 by Anadolu Tur Reklam. In 2016, the song "Kale" from his album Rakkas was released by Gloss as a single. The following year, Gloss released his other single "Gypsy Song Sahara".

== Discography ==
Studio albums

- Diskomatik Kâtibim (1978, Beta Müzik; re-released in 2009 by Ossi Müzik)
- Disco Madımak (1979, Yonca Plak)
- Disco Türkü (1980, Yonca Plak, with Kısa Dalga Group)
- Disco Maşallah (1981, Yaşar Kekeva Plak, with Kısa Dalga Group)
- Disco Gencebay (1981, Kervan Plak, with Kısa Dalga Group)
- TRT Ara Müziği (1987, Oskar Plak)
- Jazz Eastern (1998)
- Rakkas (2000, Bonus Müzik)
- Jazz İstanbul (2003, Universal)
- Jazz Eastern II (2006, DMC)
- East Inn (2006, DMC)
- Saharians (2009, Ares Müzik)
- Romantika (2009, Âti Müzik)
- Elektro Klasikler (2009, Âti Müzik)
- Saz ve Jazz Eserleri (2009, Âti Müzik)
- Modern Oyun Havaları (2009, Âti Müzik)
- Lounge with Our Golden Songs (2009, Şafakaraman Production)
- Guitar & Bouzouki Plays 10 Hot Hits (2009, Şafakaraman Production)
- Senfonik Rock Türkülerimiz, Vol. 01 (2013, Fono Müzik, with Allegra Quartet)
- Tangopera (2014, Anadolu Tur Reklam, Allegra Quartet ile)

Singles

- "Kale" (2016, Gloss)
- "Gypsy Song Sahara" (2017, Gloss)

As featured artist

- Jazz 'n' World Vol. 1 (1999, Columbia Records)
- Buddha-Bar III (2001, George V Records)
- Kebab Connection (2005, Normal Records)
- Homegrown Istanbul - 2 (2008, Pozitif Müzik Yapım)
- Beyond Istanbul 2 - Urban Sounds of Turkey (2009, Trikont)

== As arranger ==
Year	Artist	Title	Label	Note/Ref
1977	Nükhet Duru	"Harp ve Sulh/Bir İnsan Doğdu"	1 Numara	
1977	Nazan Şoray	"Yalnızlık/Seninle Doğmak"	Öncü Plak	
1977	Pakize Suda	"Biz Kadınlar/Nerden Bilsin Alem Beni"	Gönül Plak	
1978	Ayşegül Aldinç & Mehmet Teoman	"Hastane/Yorgun ve Mutlu"	EMI	
1978	Nükhet Duru	Melankoli	1 Numara	With Onno Tunç and Doğan Canku
1978	Nükhet Duru	"Anılar/Güneş"	1 Numara	With Onno Tunç
1978	Gökben	"Aşkla Pazarlık Olmaz/Aşktan Başım Dönüyor"	1 Numara	With Onno Tunç
1978	Tanju Okan	"Parkta Yatıyorum/Çocukluğum"	Philips Plak	
1978	Neco	"Bir Artist/Sen Kimsin?"	EMI	
1979	Nilüfer	Nilüfer '79	Yavuz Plak	
1979	Nükhet Duru	"Portofino/Yıldızlar"	1 Numara	
1979	Cantekin	"Ayrılık Olmasa/Dua"	Şahinler Plak	With Onno Tunç
1979	Ali Kocatepe	Besteleriyle Ali Kocatepe	1 Numara	With Attila Özdemiroğlu, Doğan Canku, Hurşid Yenigün and Onno Tunç
1979	Gökben	"Bir Tanrıyı Bir de Beni Unutma/Haydi"	1 Numara	
1980	Ferdi Özbeğen	Mutluluklar	Kervan Plak	
1980	Ferdi Özbeğen	Nice Yıllara	Yaşar Kekeva Plak	
1980	Nurhan Damcıoğlu	Disco Kanto	Türküola Müzik	
1980	Sezen Aksu	Sevgilerimle	Kervan Plak	
1980	Nilüfer	Nilüfer '80	Burç Plak	
1980	Nil Burak	İki Elim Yakanda	Kervan Plak	
1980	Asu Maralman	Bağrı Yanık Dostlara	Öncü Plak	
1980	Atilla Atasoy	"Kışla Havası/Günah Bende"	Öncü Plak	
1980	Nazan Şoray	"Hal Hal/İyi Diyelim İyi Olalım"	Öncü Plak	With Ahmet Güvenç
1981	Ferdi Özbeğen	Yaşadıkça	Yaşar Kekeva Plak	
1981	Sibel Egemen	Sibel	Balet Plak	With Özkan Turgay
1981	Nil Burak	Bizim Diyar	Kervan Plak	With Buğra Uğur
1981	Selçuk Ural	Sevdalıyım	Yaşar Kekeva Plak	
1981	Seyyal Taner	Lider	Yavuz Plak	
1981	Nazan Şoray	Teselliye Sen Gerek	Öncü Plak	With Ahmet Güvenç and Garo Mafyan
1981	Recep Aktuğ	"Giden Gençliğime/Canım"	Öncü Plak	
1981	Coşkun Demir	"Varsın Olsun/Bize Kalan Nedir"	1 Numara	
1981	Nazan Öncel	"Neden"		
1982	Ferdi Özbeğen	Bir Sır Gibi	Yaşar Kekeva Plak	
1982	Nazan Öncel	Yağmur Duası	Tempo Plak	
1982	Nilüfer	Sensiz Olmaz	Yaşar Kekeva Plak	
1982	Coşkun Demir	Koca Çınar	1 Numara	With Esin Engin, Garo Mafyan and Melih Kibar
1982	Sezer Güvenirgil	Mutluluğun Bedeli	Yaşar Kekeva Plak	
1982	Gülistan Okan	Hoşgeldin	Lider Plak	With Esin Engin
1983	Ferdi Özbeğen	Seviyorum Delicesine	Yaşar Kekeva Plak	
1983	Ercan Turgut	Tanrı Misafiri	Balet Plak	
1983	Ferdi Özbeğen	Yirminci Sanat Yılı Şan Konseri	Yaşar Kekeva Plak	
1983	Orhan Gencebay	Leyla ile Mecnun	Kervan Plak	With Orhan Gencebay
1983	Neşe Alkan	Tut Kalbimi Tut	Elenor Plak	With Garo Mafyan and Müjdat Akgün
1984	Ferdi Özbeğen	Piyanist	Yaşar Kekeva Plak	
1984	Hülya Süer	Cano	Sambol Plak	
1984	Ferdi Özbeğen	Sizin Seçtikleriniz	Yaşar Kekeva Plak	
1984	Nükhet Duru	Her Şey Yeni	Balet Plak	
1984	Erol Evgin	Erol Evgin 84	Balet Plak	
1985	Ferdi Özbeğen	Belki Bir Gün	Yaşar Kekeva Plak	
1985	Nilüfer	Bir Selam Yeter	Yaşar Kekeva Plak	
1985	Yıldırım Gürses	Çoban Yıldızı	Oscar Plak	
1985	Atilla Atasoy	Sanadır Bütün Şarkılarım	Sembol Plak	With Hurşid Yenigün, Uğur Dikmen and Ümit Eroğlu
1986	Ferdi Özbeğen	Sana İhtiyacım Var	Yaşar Kekeva Plak	
1986	Samime Sanay	Yudum Yudum Sevdayım	Kervan Plak	
1986	Nurhan Damcıoğlu	Zilli	Türküola Müzik	
1986	Ferdi Özbeğen	Sevdiğiniz Şarkılar	Yaşar Kekeva Plak	
1986	Ahmet Kaya	An Gelir	Gam Müzik	
1986	Coşkun Demir	Kim O	Uzelli Müzik	With Esin Engin and Melih Kibar
1987	Ferdi Özbeğen	Başka Başka Bambaşka	Yaşar Kekeva Plak	With Muzaffer Özpınar
1987	Ahmet Kaya	Yorgun Demokrat	Taç Plak	
1987	Sibel Can	Günah Bize	Kervan Plak	With Özer Şenay and Vedat Yıldırımbora
1987	Selami Şahin	İyi Düşün Sevgilim	Lider Plak	With Cengiz Coşkuner and Metin Alkanlı
1987	Atilla Kaya	Gülsene Güzel	Disco Plak	
1988	Zeki Müren	Gözlerin Doğuyor Gecelerime	Yavuz Plak	
1988	Ferdi Özbeğen	Senden Sonra	Yaşar Kekeva Plak	
1988	Arif Susam	O Kadın için	Özer Plak	
1988	Bülent Ersoy	Biz Ayrılamayız	Sembol Plak	With Burhan Bayar, İskender Şencemal and Muzaffer Özpınar
1988	Ahmet Kaya	Başkaldırıyorum	Barış Müzik	
1988	Emel Sayın	Sevdalılar	Yavuz Plak	
1989	Ferdi Özbeğen	Yaktı Geçti	Yaşar Kekeva Plak	With Muzaffer Özpınar
1989	Gökben	Severken Yoruldum	Oscar Plak	
1989	Bülent Ersoy	İstiyorum	Sembol Plak	
1989	Cengiz Kurtoğlu	Hayatımı Yaşıyorum	Özer Plak	
1989	Bülent Ersoy	Öptüm	Sembol Plak	With Muzaffer Özpınar
1989	Ahmet Kaya	İyimser Bir Gül	Barış Müzik	
1990	Ferdi Özbeğen	Kara Sevda	Yaşar Kekeva Plak	
1990	Emel Sayın	Üzüldüğün Şeye Bak	Yavuz Plak	
1990	Zeki Müren	Dilek Çeşmesi	Yavuz & Burç Plak	
1990	Cengiz Kurtoğlu	Aşkımız için	Özer Plak	
1990	Fatih Kısaparmak	Cemre Düşünce	Özer Plak	
1990	Gülden Karaböcek	Almanya Konseri	Özpınar Plak	With Turhan Yükseler
1990	Nil Ünal	Seni Beklerim	Özer Plak	
1991	Ahmet Kaya	Başım Belada	Barış Müzik	
1991	Hülya Avşar	Hülya Gibi	Tempa-Foneks	
1991	Cengiz Kurtoğlu	Gözlerin	Özer Plak	
1991	Bülent Ersoy	Bir Sen Bir de Ben	Sembol Plak	With Muzaffer Özpınar
1991	Ferhat Tunç	Ateş Gibi	Bayşu Müzik	
1991	Gülden Karaböcek	Hayatımın Şarkıları	Sedef Müzik	
1991	Saadet Sun	Sevdam Dudaklarında	Şan Müzik	
1992	Ferdi Özbeğen	Davacı Değilim	Yaşar Kekeva Plak	
1992	Zeki Müren	Sorma	Yavuz & Burç Plak	
1992	Bülent Ersoy	Ablan Kurban Olsun Sana	Tempa-Foneks	With Muzaffer Özpınar
1992	Ahmet Kaya	Dokunma Yanarsın	Tempa-Foneks	
1992	Yeliz	Haklıydın	Özer Plak	
1993	Ferdi Özbeğen	Bir Başkadır Ferdi Özbeğen	Mega Müzik	
1993	Tülay Özer	Olmalı, Olacak	Özbir Müzik	
1993	Cengiz Kurtoğlu	Sensiz Kutladım	Özbir Müzik	
1993	Ahmet Kaya	Tedirgin	Raks Müzik	
1993	Bülent Ersoy	Sefam Olsun	Tempa-Foneks	
1993	Seyyal Taner	Kalbimi Affettim	Yavuz Plak	With Norayr Demirci and Timur Selçuk
1994	Ahmet Kaya	Şarkılarım Dağlara	Raks Müzik	
1994	Funda	Haydi Durma	Ercan Müzik	
1994	Gülden Karaböcek	Sevenlerin Duası	Aziz Plak	
1994	Ferhat Tunç	Özlemim Dağ Rüzgarları	Bayşu Müzik	
1994	Arif Susam	Unutulmuyor	Özer Plak	
1995	Ahmet Kaya	Beni Bul	Raks Müzik	
1995	Muazzez Ersoy	Nostalji 1	Levent Müzik	
1995	Linet	Linet	Kervan Plak	
1995	İbrahim Tatlıses	Klasikleri	Raks Müzik	
1995	Gülden Karaböcek	Senin için	Aziz Müzik	
1995	Ferhat Tunç	Kanı Susturun	Bay Müzik	
1996	Ferdi Özbeğen	İşte Geldim	Mert Müzik	
1996	Ebru Yaşar	Bu Sahilde (Vurulur Düşlerim)	Çaçan Plak	
1996	Ahmet Kaya	Yıldızlar ve Yakamoz	Gam Müzik	
1996	Serap Sapaz	Yeminliyim Ben	Uzelli Müzik	
1996	İbrahim Tatlıses	Ben de İsterem	Raks Müzik	
1996	Gülden Karaböcek	Gönül Sözüm	Aziz Müzik	
1996	Uğur Ünal	En İyi Aşkım	Jazz Plak	
1997	Emel Sayın	Başrolde Emel Sayın	Raks Müzik	
1997	Selda Bağcan	Çifte Çiftetelli	Majör Müzik	
1997	Bülent Ersoy	Maazallah	Raks Müzik	With Halil Karaduman
1997	Nükhet Duru	Mühür	Müzikom	
1997	Ferhat Tunç	Kayıp	Destan Müzik	
1998	İbrahim Tatlıses	At Gitsin	Raks Müzik	
1998	Ferdi Özbeğen	Kandil	Kiss Müzik	
1998	Muazzez Abacı	Cesaretim Var	Klip Müzik	With Mustafa Savaş
1998	Ahmet Kaya	Dosta Düşmana Karşı	Raks Müzik	With İlker Yurtcan
1998	Ferhat Tunç	Kavgamın Çiçeği	Prestij Müzik	
1998	Hasan Cihat Örter	Fretless Songs	DMC	
2000	Burak Kut	Burak Kut	Universal Müzik Yapım	With Burak Kut, Eser Taşkıran, Hakan Kurşun and Tansel Doğanay
2000	Ege	Aşkların En Güzeline	S Müzik, Universal Müzik Yapım	With Kıvanç K., Ozan Doğulu, Tamer Çıray, Tolga Tekin and İlker Akman
2001	Beş Yıl Önce On Yıl Sonra	Biraz Müzik	Post Müzik	
2002	Bülent Ersoy	Canımsın	Avrupa Müzik	With Halil Karaduman
2002	Ali Kırca	Habersiz Türküler	Columbia Records, Sony Music Entertainment, Kiss Müzik	
2003	Fatih Kısaparmak	Sevdaysa Sevda Kavgaysa Kavga	Akbaş Müzik	With Hakkı Balamir
2003	Ferhat Tunç	Nerdesin ey Kardeşlik	Royem Müzik	
2004	Ahmet Şafak	Adam gibi	Şahin Özer Müzik	
2004	Muazzez Ersoy	Seni Seviyorum	Columbia Records, Sony Music Entertainment, Kiss Müzik	With Selim Çaldıran
2005	Uğur Arslan	Deniz Feneri Şiirleri 4: Biz Barışmalıyız Artık	Avrupa Müzik	
2006	İntizar	Ihlamurlar Altında (Nazar Boncuğu)	Boğaziçi Müzik	With Barış Engürlü, Murat Arslan, Nail Yurtsever and Necip Yılgın
2007	Zerrin Özer	Zerrin Özer	Ozan Video	With Cihan Akyıldız, Çağatay Kadı and Sezgin Gezgin
2007	Kutsi	Aynı Şehirde Bile Nefes Almak Bana Yetiyor	Erol Köse Production	
2008	Zekai Tunca	Zil, Şal ve Gül	EMI	
2008	Sevda Karababa	Hislerimin Talebesiyim	Erol Köse Production	With Hüseyin Çebişçi and Ödül Erdoğan
2008	Zekai Tunca	Zil, Şal ve Gül	EMI	
2008	Ece Ülker	İnce Çizgilerde	Ossi Müzik	With Emre Bayar and Yıldıray Gürgen
2009	Ferhat Tunç	Çığlıklar Ülkesi	DMC	
2009	Sezil Güler	Aşk Değil	Âti Müzik	
2013	Aylin Şengün Taşçı	Hatırla	Akustik Müzik	
2014	Adalılar	Haziran	Anadolu Müzik	
2014	Yanar	Sır	Star Prodüksiyon	
2014	Bora Öznacar	Hayat Bazen	Fono Müzik	
2014	Özlem Eskimez	Türkülerimiz Eskimez	Fono Müzik	
2014	Egecan Türkoğlu	Derviş	Türküola Müzik	
2014	Ferhat Tunç	Kobani	Kirkelig Kulturverksted	
2016	Çağlar Alkaç	Yanacaksın	Seyhan Müzik	
2016	Ferhat Güneyli	İşte Gidiyorum	Majör Müzik	
