= Fatih Kısaparmak =

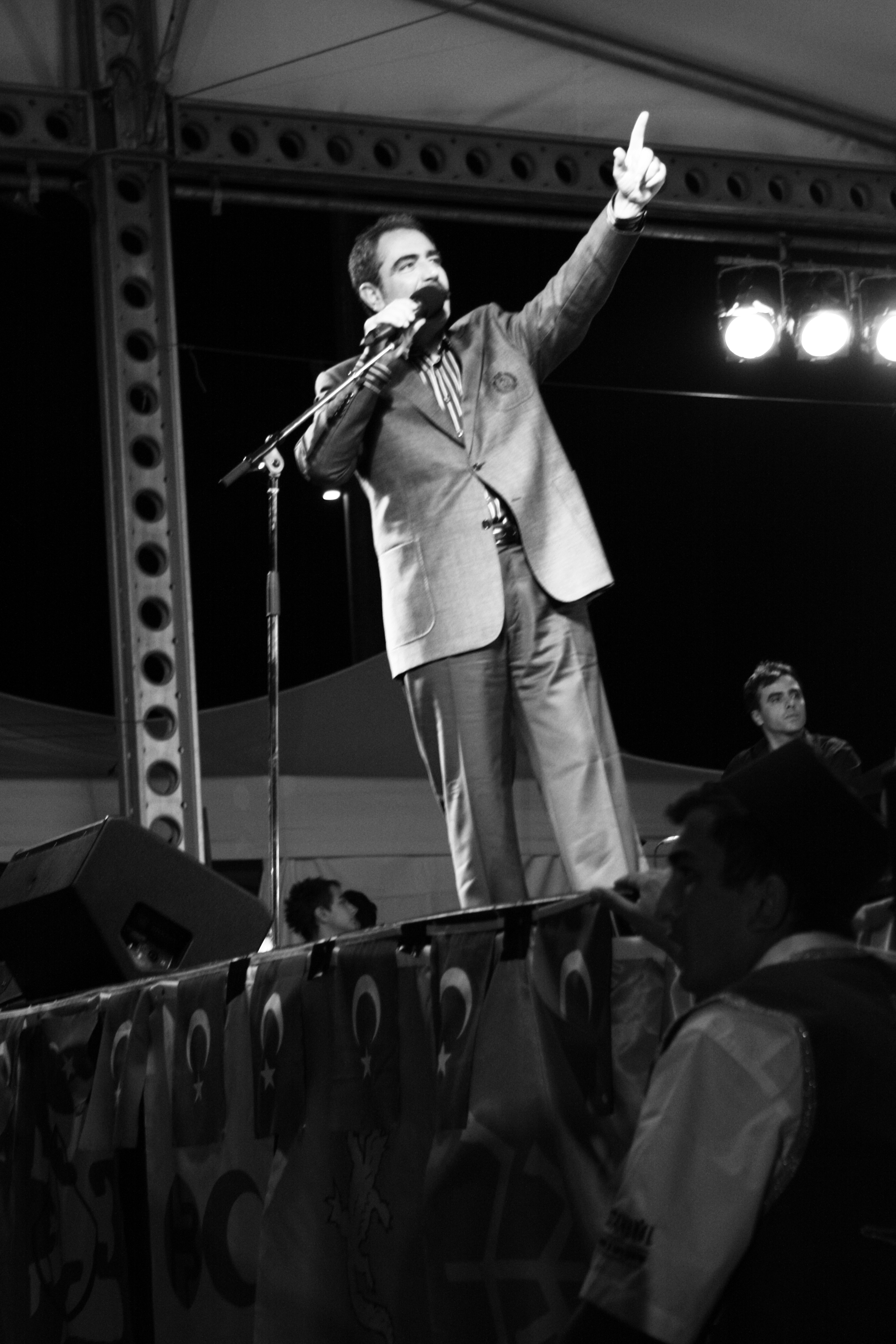
- Kısaparmak in March 2010 Australia concert
- Born: 31 January 1961 (age 65); Maden, Elazığ, Elazığ Province, East Anatolia, Turkey
- Occupations: Musician; Lyricist; Songwriter; Composer; Ashik; Poet; Television presenter; Folk music artist; baglama virtuoso
- Musical career
- Genres: Turkish folk music; Protest music
- Instruments: Bağlama; Violin; Cura; Balaban; Lavta
- Years active: 1987–present

Fatih Güngör (b. 31 January 1961) known professionally as Fatih Kısaparmak, is a Turkish folk music artist, songwriter, composer, poet, musician, television presenter, and baglama virtuoso.

== Albums ==
- Kilim - Nazlı Bebe (1987) (Ferdifon Music)
- Yarına Kaç Var - Bekle Küçüğüm (1989) (Quality Trade Plaque)
- Cemre Düşünce (1990) (Caravan Plaque)
- Güneşi Biz Uyandırdık (1991) (Istanbul Plaque)
- Portakal Çiçeğim (1992) (Sindoma Music)
- Dicle'nin Oğlu (1993) (Great Record)
- Hoşçakal (1994) (Ulus Music)
- Fatih Kısaparmak'tan Hitler (1994) (Prestige Music)
- Mozaik 1 (1995) (Gürses Cassettecilik)
- Mozaik 2 (1996) (Ozulku Music)
- Olur Mu Böyle Hasan (1998) (İdobay Music)
- Mor Salkımlı Sokak...Ve Senin Şiirlerim (1999) (Erol Köse Production)
- Bu Dağ Ne Rüzgarlar Gördü (2000) (Gold Record)
- Vay Benim Hayallerim (2001) (Akbas Music)
- Sevdaysa Sevda, Kavgaysa Kavga (2003) (GAM Music)
- Ben İki Kere Ağladım (2004) (Kalan Music)
- Belki Dönemem Anne (2007) (TMC Music)
- Mor Salkimli Sokak ve Senin Siirlerim (2008) (Arpeggio Production)
- Ask Ve Özgürlük Icin (2009) (Black Sea Music)
- Sonsuza Kadar (2012) (Iberian Music)
- Bu Şehir Benden Sorulur (2022) (Poll Production)
