= Ersoy =

Ersoy is a Turkish surname. Er means man or soldier and soy means ancestry. Notable people with this surname include:

- Başak Ersoy (born 1991), Turkish female footballer
- Bülent Ersoy (born 1952), Turkish singer
- Ertuğrul Ersoy (born 1997), Turkish footballer
- Mehmet Ersoy (born 1968), Turkish businessperson and current Minister of Culture and Tourism
- Mehmet Akif Ersoy (1873–1936), Turkish poet
- Muazzez Ersoy (born 1958), Turkish female singer
- Okan Ersoy, Turkish-American scientist
- Şükrü Ersoy (born 1931), Turkish footballer
- Uğur Ersoy (born 1932), Turkish engineer and academic
