= Tülay Özer =

Turkish singer (1946–2026)

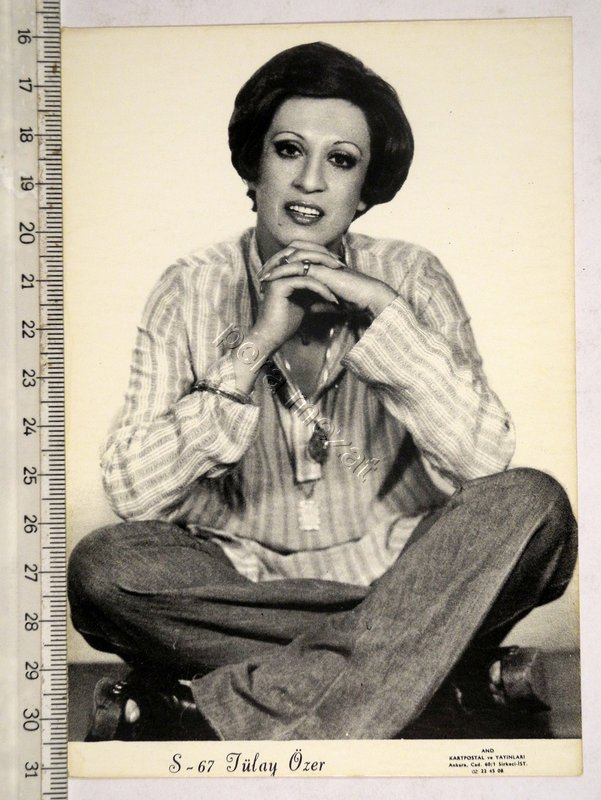
- Özer in 1988

Background information
- Born: 10 December 1946; Kemaliye, Turkey
- Died: 1 May 2026 (aged 79)
- Genres: Pop folk; Arabesque
- Occupation: Singer
- Instrument: Vocals
- Years active: 1972–2010
- Labels: Kent Plak; Yaşar Plak; Çağdaş Plak; Özbir Müzik

Tülay Özer (10 December 1946 – 1 May 2026) was a Turkish singer, best known for her albums Tülay (1976), Seven Ağlatılmaz (1978), Kalbimdeki Sevgili (1981), Özleyiş (1989), and Olmalı Olacak (1993).

== Background ==
Born in the Kemaliye district of Erzincan as the eldest of four sisters named Tülay, Nilgün, Songül and Zerrin Özer, Tülay, whose main profession was accountancy, started her professional music career in 1972.

== Career ==
Tülay's first release came out in 1974 with Gel Artık – Niye Çattın Kaşlarını. 1975 was her debut year; in the same year, she had massive breakthrough with her release of İkimiz Bir Fidanız – Son Ümit, released by Kent Plak. She received the Golden Record Award for this success at the İzmir Fuarı where she performed live for the first time. Tülay left her mark on 1976 with her release of Deli Etme Beni Aşk – Neden Ayrıldık. She sang songs arranged by Esin Engin, which were based on Anatolian pop, and Arabesque music. She reinterpreted songs in this line, which were mainly arranged by Esin Engin by composers such as Hakkı Bulut and Bora Ayanoğlu.

Her first LP was released on the Kent label in 1976. At the end of 1978, she released her second LP, Seven Ağlatılmaz, this time she released the single "Büklüm Büklüm", a Sezen Aksu composition, topping the record lists for the last time.

In the 1980s, while Tülay's fame was losing its former glory, her sister Zerrin Özer was on a rapid rise in her music career. Tülay, who gave all kinds of support for her sister to enter the music industry, did not enter into a competition with Zerrin and continued this support. Tülay, who left the Kent Record company, where she worked for years, fell short of the success she had hoped for with her last LP, Kalpimdeki Beloved, which she had released in the Pop-Arabesque style under the Yaşar Plak label. After this, she took a break from her musical activities.

== Later career ==
Tülay, who got married and became the mother of a son named Hakan, made a few more albums in the late 80s and 90s, but they did not make a splash. Tülay's last work in the context of interpretation was the song "Kolay Vazgeçmeyi Öğrendim", which she sang in a duet with Kıraç in the pop genre tribute album Her Devrin Devleri, which was supervised by her sister Zerrin Özer in 2010.

== Death and funeral ==
Özer died on 1 May 2026, at the age of 79. The next day, she was buried at Zincirlikuyu Cemetery.

== Discography ==
=== Singles ===
- Gel Artık & Niye Çattın Kaşlarını – Kent – (1974)
- Ağlayan Gözlerim Gülmüyor Gayri & Geceler – Kent – (1974)
- İkimiz Bir Fidanız & Son Ümit – Kent – (1975)
- Falcı & Kalbimi Sana Vermiştim – Kent – (1975)
- Deli Etme Beni Aşk & Neden Ayrıldık – Kent – (1975)
- Bir Hatanın Kurbanıyız & Öldürecekler Beni – Kent – (1976)
- Dünyalara Değişmem & Bil ki Ben de Seni Düşünüp Ağlıyorum – Kent – (1977)
- Büklüm Büklüm & İlk Aşk – Kent – (1978)

=== Albums ===
- Tülay – Kent LP – (1976)
- Seven Ağlatılmaz – Kent LP – (1978)
- Kalbimdeki Sevgili – Yaşar LP – (1981)
- Özleyiş – Çağdaş – (1989)
- Olmalı Olacak – Tempa Foneks – (1993)
- Her Devrin Devleri (Kolay Vazgeçmeyi Öğrendim adlı parça ile, düet Kıraç) – Atlas – (2010)
