= Cengiz Kurtoğlu =

- Born: 5 May 1959 (age 67); Arhavi, Artvin Province, Black Sea Region, Turkey
- Genres: Fantasty, folk, folk-pop, Arabesque, electronic, Turkish classicial
- Occupations: musician, songwriter, arranger, lyricist, composer, record producer, pianist
- Instruments: Piano, organ
- Years active: 1982–present
- Labels: Şahin Özer Müzik (1984–1997); Sindoma Müzik (1997–2002); Bay Müzik (2002–2005); Arma Müzik (2005–2011); Esen Müzik (2011–2017); Poll Production (2017–present)

Cengiz Kurtoğlu (born. 5 May 1959) is a Turkish musician, record producer, lyricist, songwriter, composer, and pianist.

He worked as a civil servant at a tea factory in Rize Province and moved to Istanbul in 1984. On 12 September 1984, his first album Sen Sözden Anlamaz Mısın? was released. His later albums helped him garner popularity, and a fan group called Cengizciler was established (Fans of Cengiz). In 2010 Cengiz Kurtoğlu released an album called Sessizce.

== Albums ==
1. (1984) Sen Sözden Anlamaz Mısın? (Özer Plakçılık)
2. (1986) Unutulan (Özer Plakçılık)
3. (1987) Yıllarım (Özer Plakçılık)
4. (1988) Bizim Şarkımız (Özer Plakçılık)
5. (1989) Hayatımı Yaşıyorum (Özer Plakçılık)
6. (1990) Aşkımız İçin (Özer Plakçılık)
7. (1991) Gözlerin (Özer Plakçılık)
8. (1992) Sensiz Kutladım (Özer Plakçılık)
9. (1994) Seven Benim (Özer Plakçılık)
10. (1996) Seviyorum (Özer Plakçılık)
11. (1997) Unutulmayanlar / Unutulan (Özer Plakçılık)
12. (1998) Hain Geceler (Sindoma Muzik)
13. (1999) "Unutulmayanlar 2" (Özer Plakçılık)
14. (1999) Gözü Yaşlı Yaşanmıyor (Sindoma Muzik)
15. (1 Ocak 2000) "Hiç Aklıma Gelmemişti" (Özer Plakçılık)
16. (2000) Sözlerim Sevenlere (Sindoma Müzik)
17. (2001) Yalancı Bahar" (Sindoma Müzik)
18. (2002) Yorgun Yillarim (Sima Müzik)
19. (2004) "Sensiz Olmuyor" (Özer Plakçılık)
20. (2005) Ayrilik Saati (Sima Müzik)
21. (2006) "Canın Sağolsun" (Ati Müzik)
22. (2010) Sessizce (Esen Plak)
23. (2014) Saklı Düşler (Esen Plak)
24. (2018) Usta Çırak (with Hakan Altun) (Poll Production)
25. (2021) Kalpsiz (with Ayşen Birgör) (Fifth Floor Records)
26. (2022) Aşkın Cenneti (Poll Production)
