= Kutsi =

Kutsi may refer to:

- Kutsi (singer) (Ahmet Kutsi Karadoğan), Turkish singer-songwriter
- Ahmet Kutsi Tecer, Turkish poet and politician
- Kutsi, Rohatyn Raion, a village next to Rohatyn, Ivano-Frankivsk Oblast, Ukraine
