= Gülden Karaböcek =

Turkish singer (born 1953)

- Born: Saniye Gülden Göktürk; 4 November 1953 (age 72); Ankara, Turkey
- Genres: Arabesque, pop, fantasy, Turkish folk, Turkish classical
- Occupations: Singer-songwriter, actress
- Instruments: Bağlama, guitar, piano
- Years active: 1967–present
- Website: www.guldenkarabocek.com.tr

Saniye Gülden Göktürk, better known as Gülden Karaböcek (born 4 November 1953) is a Turkish fantezi and arabesque singer.

== Life and career ==
=== Early years and career beginnings ===
Karaböcek is one of the first names in arabesque and fantasy music and has tried many styles during her music career but she has earned reputation primarily from her unique arabesque songs which feature fantasy elements. Born Saniye Gülden Göktürk, after completing her primary and secondary education in Ankara, she took singing and solfege lessons from Yaşar Aydaş at Ankara Radio. She came to Istanbul with her family from Ankara and completed her first records at the age of 14–15: "Yazılanlar Gelir Başa & Garip Kaldım". Famous artist Orhan Gencebay accompanied Karaböcek on this plaque, playing bağlama. She released her first record under the name Gülden Göktürk, but due to several issues in her family, in 1972 by a court order she took the surname that her sister, famous musician Neşe Karaböcek, had chosen for herself.

In April 1982, her album Gülden Fırtınası was released, which featured the hit songs "Küstüm Sana Dünya", "Mahşer Gününde", "İki Kelime", "Can mı Dayanır" and "Nasıl Güleyim", but did not provide the expected commercial success.

The song "Anne" (Mother) from the album Silemem, which was written by Mehmet Yüzüak, received acclaim from critics and fans.

=== 2000s onwards ===
In 2004, Karaböcek was among the artists that were featured on the album Söz Vermiş Şarkılar in tribute to Murathan Mungan and performed the song "Otel Odaları". In 2006, together with Muazzez Abacı, she performed at the Nostalgic Lake Casino during the İzmir Fair after 22 years.

On 5 April 2010, during an interview for Milliyet she was asked by Olcay Ünal Sert: "There's a rebellion in your songs. In your song ‘Sürünüyorum’ you say "Create me again to relieve me from this pain", and in ‘Kırılsın Ellerim’ you say "When will this end my God?, We have stayed in days that don't have a tomorrow". What was this rebellious behavior in those years?", to which she responded "It reflects a period. After the September 1980 revolution, came across a painful period. People found solace in painful songs. We are currently experiencing a new critical period. I'm just the performer thought, you need to ask the one who wrote the songs about the actual meaning behind them."

In 2012, she was awarded the Lifetime Honorary Award at the 18th Golden Lens Awards of the 18th Journalists' Association held at the Sheraton Hotel in Ataköy, Istanbul. After receiving the award, she said thanked her fans and the people and said: "You are the real owners of my songs".

In 2015 Karaböcek gave a series of concerts in Germany in the cities of Dortmund, Cologne, Essen, Berlin, and gave her first concert in 2016 in her birthplace Başkent, Ankara. On 5 July 2016, she performed in Didim, followed by another concert on 7 July in Karaman during the 1st International Başyayla Cherry and Culture Festival. On 5 November 2016, she celebrated her birthday with a concert in Istanbul's Beirut Performance Hall.

In 2018, Karaböcek attracted attention across Turkey with a remix version of her song "Saka Yaptım" for a movie called Arada. In 2019, a portion of song "Anilar bana yeter" was sampled in track called "Tehran gunshots" by Bristol dubstep producer Sir Hiss, which was primarily done for soundsystem clash event & gain much attention in dubstep community since release. In 2022, a Drum and bass version, named "Earshots" and based on the same sample, was released as collaboration between Sir Hiss and London collective 4AM Kru.

== Discography ==
=== Phonographs ===
- Yazılanlar Gelir Başa / Garip Kaldım (1968)
- Hayat Defteri / Dünyaya Geldim Neden (1968)
- Derdimi Dökersem Derin Dereye / Oy Bende Yare Bende (1971)
- Adaletin Bu Mu Dünya / Oy Beni Beni (1971)
- Hasta Gönlüm / Gönül Dağı (1972)
- Gözlerin Güldükçe / Unuttum Artık Seni (1972)
- Koşma Koşma / Dünyanın En Güzeli (1972)
- Yaralı Kalp / Anca Beraber Kanca Beraber (1972)
- Sevdim Sevdim Ne Kazandım / Şaka Yaptım Ben Sana (1972)
- Tövbe Ettim Sevmeye / Gözümüz Yok Ama Niye Olsun (1973)
- İşte Gidiyorum Çeşm-İ Siyahım / Dumanlı Dumanlı Oy Bizim Eller (1973)
- Dur Bırakma Beni / Güleceksin Ağlanacak Haline (1973)
- Kalbindeki Sevgili / Şaka (1973)
- Ahu Gözlüm / Artık Sorma Beni (1974)
- Nem Kaldı / Bitmez Tükenmez Geceler (1974)
- Şu Sazıma Bir Düzen Ver / Gitme Durnam (1974)
- Yalancısın / Ela Gözlüm (1975)
- Bana Gerçekleri Söyle / Dur Dinle Sevgilim (1975)
- Kır Çiçekleri / Dokunma Keyfine Yalan Dünyanın (1976)
- Çeşme / Ne Bilirdim Ki ? (1977)
- Dilek Taşı / Sevmek Nedir Ki (1978)

=== Albums ===
- Anadolu'nun Bağrından (1975)
- Gülden Karaböcek (1975)
- Gülden Karaböcek 2 (1975)
- Dostum (1977)
- Gülden Karaböcek 3 (1977)
- Dilek Taşı (1978)
- Müzik ve Ben (1979)
- Çeşme (1981)
- Gülden Fırtınası (1982)
- Dertlerin Kadını (1982)
- Yalan Almanya (1983)
- Gülden'in Dünyası (1983)
- Dünyadan Zevk Almıyorum (1984)
- Yalvarmıyorum (1984)
- Ağlıyorsam Yaşıyorum (1984)
- Sev Yeter (1984)
- Öyle Yalnız Kaldım Ki (1984)
- Duyar Mısın Feryadımı (1985)
- Aşığım Seviyorum (1986)
- Adaletin Bu mu Dünya (1987)
- Hasret Pınarı (1987)
- Bir Mucize Allahım (1987)
- Zirvede on Yıl/Bestelerim (1988)
- Mutluluğa Geç Kaldım (1989)
- Hatıralar Silinir Mi? (1989)
- Hayatımın Şarkıları (1989)
- Gençliğim Kayboldu (1989)
- Mutluluğa Geç Kaldım (1989)
- Suçlumuyum (1989)
- Hatıran Yeter (1990)
- Anılar Bana Yeter (1990)
- Ara Beni Mutluluk (1990)
- Sevda Gözlüm (1990)
- Aşk Şiirleriyle Hasret Pınarı Var (1991)
- İkimizde Sevmiştik (1991)
- Sabrımın Bedelisin (1992)
- Kısmetse Olur (1992)
- Hayrını Gör (1993)
- Kırgınım Anılara (1993)
- Yalanmıydı (1994)
- Sevenlerin Duası (1994)
- Senin İçin (1995)
- Silemem (1997)
- Sen Bana Yetersin (1997)
- Güldence (2001)
- Hatıran Yeter/Güneş Topla Benim İçin (2010)
- Bir Mucize Allahım / Konuşsana Bir Tanem (2011)
- Senin Olsun (2012)
