= Ferdi Özbeğen =

Turkish singer (1941–2013)

- Cover of Sana İhtiyacım Var album (1986)
- Born: 19 August 1941; İzmir, Turkey
- Died: 28 January 2013 (aged 71); Istanbul, Turkey
- Education: Economics
- Occupations: Singer; pianist
- Musical career
- Genres: Turkish popular music; Turkish folk music
- Years active: 1965–2009

Ferdi Özbeğen (19 August 1941 – 28 January 2013) was a Turkish singer of folk and popular music.

== Early life and education ==
Ferdi Özbeğen was born on 17 August 1941, in İzmir. His father was Hassan Özbeğen, an immigrant from Crete, and his mother Afet "Anita" Özbeğen, a Catholic Armenian from Ankara. Their son's name was originally "Ferdinand." At some point, the family moved to Istanbul, where young Ferdi enrolled for his secondary education into the Mıhitaryan School.

At the age of 11, Özbeğen, along with his secondary school tuition started taking music lessons at home. He graduated from Istanbul University in Economics in 1960. When his father died in 1963, he turned to music in a professional capacity.

== Career ==
In 1965, Özbegen, along with the orchestra he'd put together, participated in the "Golden Microphone" competition organized by the Hürriyet newspaper, performing the songs "Kes Kes" ("Cut Cut") and "Sandığımı Açamadım" ("I Can't Open My Chest").

He soon established himself as a performer of fantezi urban folk music. On 1977, he released his first album and won a sales award for "Sohbet" ("Conversation") as well as a golden-piano award for "Mutluluklar" ("Happiness"). He recorded overall some 28 albums in his career.

In 1980, he starred in the movie Tanrıya Feryat ("Howl to God") in 1980 with Gülşen Bubikoğlu, Tanju Gürsu, and Hulusi Kentmen. He also worked a guest actor in the television series Perihan Abla (Sister Perihan), one of the most popular productions of the 1980s.

== Personal life ==
Özbeğen opened up about his homosexuality as an adult and, gay marriage being illegal in the 1990s, he adopted his life partner.

== Death ==
In 2001, he was diagnosed with prostate cancer, which he survived for more than a dozen years. He died on 28 January 2013 at the Okmeydanı Training and Research Hospital of Istanbul. After a memorial ceremony held at the Cemal Reşit Rey Concert Hall on 30 January and a religious funeral at the Levent mosque, he was buried in the Ulus Cemetery.

== See also ==
- Arabesque music
