= İsmail Türüt =

Turkish folk singer

- Born: 8 June 1965 (age 61); Rize, Turkey
- Genres: Folk music
- Occupation: Musician
- Instrument: Kemençe
- Years active: 1982–present
- Labels: Harika; Karadeniz; İdobay; Ulus; Avrupa; Arma; Klip
- Website: Official website

İsmail Türüt (born 8 June 1965) is a Turkish folk music artist from the Black Sea Region.

== Controversies ==
=== Plan Yapmayın Plan ===
His 2007 album, Dünya Tatlısı, contains a song named Plans, don't make any plans (Turkish: Plan Yapmayın Plan), which created a major controversy in Turkey. The lyrics take aim at Americans, Russians, Kurds, Christians, Armenians and the Turks who support them, telling them not to make plans against the Black Sea region of Turkey. The lyrics praise Alperen Hearths and Ozan Arif, the alleged killers of the Armenian-Turkish journalist Hrant Dink and end with "If a person betrays the country, he is finished off". Whereas the song does not name Ogün, Yasin and Hrant Dink explicitly, a video clip posted on YouTube shows images of Ogün, Yasin, and Hrant Dink throughout the song. Yasin Hayal of Trabzon claimed responsibility for making the video clip. He claims that he didn't have a political motive when creating the clip, but created the clip as a hobbyist.

=== Gezi Park protests ===
Turut wrote a song about the 2013 Gezi Park protests in Istanbul. The lyrics accuse the demonstrators of terrorism, religious unbelief, communism and Zionism.

== Television programmes ==
- 1997–2001, 2003–2005 Türüt Show (Kanal 7)
- 2001–2003 Türüt Show (TGRT)
- 2005–2011 Türüt Show (Flash TV)
- 2011–2013 Türütten Türküler (Meltem TV)
- 2013–2015 Türüt Show (Mavi Karadeniz TV)
- 2005–2009 Fıkralarla Türkiye (Kanal 7, Flash TV)

== Television series ==
- 2001–2003 Tirvana TGRT
- 2009–2011 N'aber Bacanak Kanal 7
