= Arif Susam =

Turkish musician

- Born: 1956 (age 69–70); Harput, Elazığ, Turkey
- Genres: Fantezi, Classical music, Arabesque
- Occupations: musician, composer, songwriter, record producer
- Instrument: piano
- Years active: 1978–present

Arif Susam (born 1956, Harput, Elazığ) is a Turkish musician. His style combines traditional Turkish tunes with synthesized instruments. He was very popular in the 80s and early 90s with fellow artists like Nejat Alp, Ümit Besen, Cengiz Kurtoğlu and Atilla Kaya.

== Career ==
His statement "Pain and suffering in various tempos" describes the career of Arif Susam spanning more than 25 years.

He started playing keyboards and singing in local clubs and restaurants. At the same period he recorded a demo and sent it to Şahin Plakçılık record label which turned up an eight figure record deal.

In 1982 he began performing live every night at Köşem Restaurant in Tarabya, Istanbul. The Köşem Restaurant sessions went on for 14 years without a break. Susam is known for being the only artist to go platinum in Turkey, as his double live 1985 album Tavernada Yıldönümü sold over 1,200,000 copies.

His live tavern performances usually took place in the Bosphorus shore district of Tarabya. Not being as much popular as he was in the 1980s, he still performs live with his Korg i3 keyboard at a restaurant in Yenikapı district.

== Personal life ==
In 1980, Arif Susam got married and had two sons. He is known for being a fanatic supporter of Galatasaray S.K. and makes a cameo appearance in the championship album Şampiyonluk Gecemiz. He is also a very close friend to Cengiz Kurtoğlu since 1980.

== Albums ==
- Efsane Aşk (1984)
- Kara Kara (1985)
- Tavernada Yıldönümü (1986)
- Kararsız Gönlüm (1987, Repressed in 2002)
- Şampiyonluk Gecemiz (1987, For Galatasaray's championships after 14 years)
- O Kadın İçin (1988, Repressed in 2002)
- Kader Utansın (1988)
- Hasreti Kutluyorum (1989, Repressed in 2002)
- Evliler De Sevebilir (1990)
- Beni Düşün (1991)
- Sevenler İçin (1992)
- Boncuk Gözlüm (1993)
- Unutulmuyor (1994)
- İşte Yeniden (1996)
- Sakın Unutma (1998)
- Aşkımız Bitmesin (1999)
- Ölümsüz Sevdim (2011)
- Best Of Arif Susam (2020)

== Films ==
- Kader Utansın (1987)
- Hatıram Olsun (1988)
- Herşeyi Bitirdik (1990)
- Benimi Buldun (1990)
- Veda Gecesi (2000)
