= Hakan Altun =

- Born: Hakan Recep Altun; 13 August 1972 (age 53); Istanbul, Turkey
- Genres: Arabesque, fantasy, Classical Turkish, Turkish folk
- Occupation: Singer
- Instruments: Oud, cümbüş
- Years active: 1998–present
- Labels: Bay; Sindoma; Bora; Çınar; Esen; Poll

Hakan Recep Altun (born 13 August 1972) is a Turkish singer, songwriter and instrumentalist.

He was born in Istanbul. After elementary school, he got a place in the academy of music, where he completed his secondary, high and university education, assisted by his grandfather Hafız Zeki Altun. After graduation bachelor of arts in music, he continued his studies focusing on Traditional Turkish Music. In his second year of post-graduate studies, he quit to pursue a career as an instrumentalist in the Edirne State Choir, playing the lute. Before a break for mandatory military service in Ankara, he performed in the most popular clubs in Istanbul. He was part of the pop band Aykut Hakan Ayşe before starting his solo career in 1998.

In TV interviews, he has stated that he composed his very first song "Hani Bekleyecektin" (You Promised You Would Wait) when he was in the army, motivated by his girlfriend's refusal to speak with him on the phone. After his eponymous first album, he went on to release Ağlamak Yok Yüreğim ("Never Cry My Heart"), Nefesimsim ("You're My Breath"), Yaralı Bir Aşkın Öyküsü ("Story of a Broken Heart"), Hediye ("Gift") and, Küstüm Aşklara ("I'm Cross with Loves") in addition to other albums.

== Discography ==
- Hakan (1999) (Bay Müzik)
- Ağlamak Yok Yüreğim (2000) (Sindoma Müzik)
- Nefesimsin (2002) (Sindoma Müzik/Bora Müzik)
- Yaralı Bir Aşkın Öyküsü (2003) (Esen Müzik)
- Hediye (2005) (Esen Müzik)
- Küstüm Aşklara (2006) (Esen Müzik)
- Aşk, Ayrılık ve Adam (2007) (Esen Müzik)
- Aklın Bende Kalmasın (2008) (Çınar Müzik)
- Tercihimdir (2010) (Çınar Müzik)
- Senden Sonrası (2012) (Esen Müzik)
- Dedemin İlahileri (2014) (Esen Müzik)
- Aşk Lütfen Gel (2015) (Poll Production)
- Usta Çırak (with Cengiz Kurtoğlu) (2018) (Poll Production)
- Çok Ağlarız (2022) (Poll Production)
