= Fantezi =

Turkish music genre

Fantezi is a Turkish classical music genre composed in Turkish pop music in accordance with the tradition of the Turkish people. Also called folk song or urban folk music, in its plural form is a Turkish music genre which has taken many forms over the years. Fantezi followed after the commercialization of Turkish classical music and Kanto music. It was strongly dominated by Turkish folk music. When used in context, it refers mostly to the form it took in the period from the 1920s to the 1980s. It is a vocal work which emerged in the 20th century, in a free style, usually having several parts, each part composed in a different tempo or method.

The main cultural Turkish dances and rhythms in today's Turkish music culture in Fantezi music are Tsifteteli, Syrta, Kaşık Havası (Fazzani), Zeybek dance, Hasaposerviko, Kalamatianos (Devr-i Hindî), Karsilamas, Maqsoum, Baladi, Sama'i (Waltz), Ayoub, Malfuf, Saidi, Masmoudi, Fellahi, Karachi, and Khaleegy (Haligi). Fantezi music was known as "Taverna müziği" performed live in the taverns and was very popular in the 80's.

Notable performers include:

- İbrahim Erkal
- Ümit Besen
- Cengiz Kurtoğlu
- Orhan Ölmez
- Sinan Özen
- Coşkun Sabah
- Metin Şentürk
- Arif Susam
- Ferdi Tayfur

== See also ==
- Laïko, Greek music genre
- Rebetiko, Greek music
