= Bülent =

Bülent is a Turkish masculine given name and a family name meaning "tall" and "high", from Persian boland or buland (بلند) which means tall, high, elevated, or lofty. The equivalent form in Azerbaijani is Bülənd. It may refer to:

== Bülend ==
- Bulend Biščević (born 1975), Bosnian footballer
- Bülend Özveren (1943–2022), Turkish television presenter and sports commentator
- Bülend Ulusu (1923–2015), Turkish admiral and former prime minister

== Bülent ==
- Bülent Akın (born 1978), Belgian-Turkish footballer
- Bülent Arel (1919-1990), Turkish-born composer
- Bülent Arınç (born 1948), Turkish politician of renowned oratory
- Bülent Atalay (born 1940), Turkish-American author, scientist, and artist
- Bülent Ataman (born 1974), Turkish footballer
- Bülent Bezdüz (born 1967), Turkish tenor
- Bülent Çetin (born 1985), Turkish amputee football player
- Bülent Çetinaslan (born 1974), Turkish actor
- Bülent Ceylan (born 1976), Turkish-German comedian
- Bülent Ecevit (1925–2006), Turkish politician, poet, writer, and journalist
- Bülent Eczacıbaşı (born 1949), Turkish billionaire businessman and philanthropist
- Bülent Eken (1923-2016), Turkish footballer and coach
- Bülent Ersoy (born 1950), Turkish singer
- Bülent Ertuğrul (born 1978), Turkish footballer
- Bülent Evcil (born 1968), Turkish flutist
- Bülent Kayabaş (1945-2017), Turkish actor
- Bülent Kocabey (born 1984), Turkish footballer
- Bülent Korkmaz (born 1968), Turkish footballer and coach
- Bülent Korkmaz (archer) (born 1975), Turkish Paralympian archer
- Bülent Ortaçgil (born 1950), Turkish composer and singer
- Bülent Özcan (born 1973), Turkish Poet
- Bulent Rauf (1911-1987), Turkish-British mystic, spiritual teacher, translator, and author
- Bülent Şenver (born 1950), Turkish banker and lecturer
- Bülent Üçüncü (born 1974), Turkish-French footballer
- Bülent Ünder (born 1949), Turkish football manager
- Bülent Uygun (born 1971), Turkish footballer and coach
- Bülent Uzun (born 1990), Turkish footballer
- Bülent Yıldırım (referee) (born 1972), Turkish football referee
- Fehmi Bülent Yıldırım (born 1966), Turkish Muslim activist
