= Orhan Gencebay =

Turkish musician (born 1944)

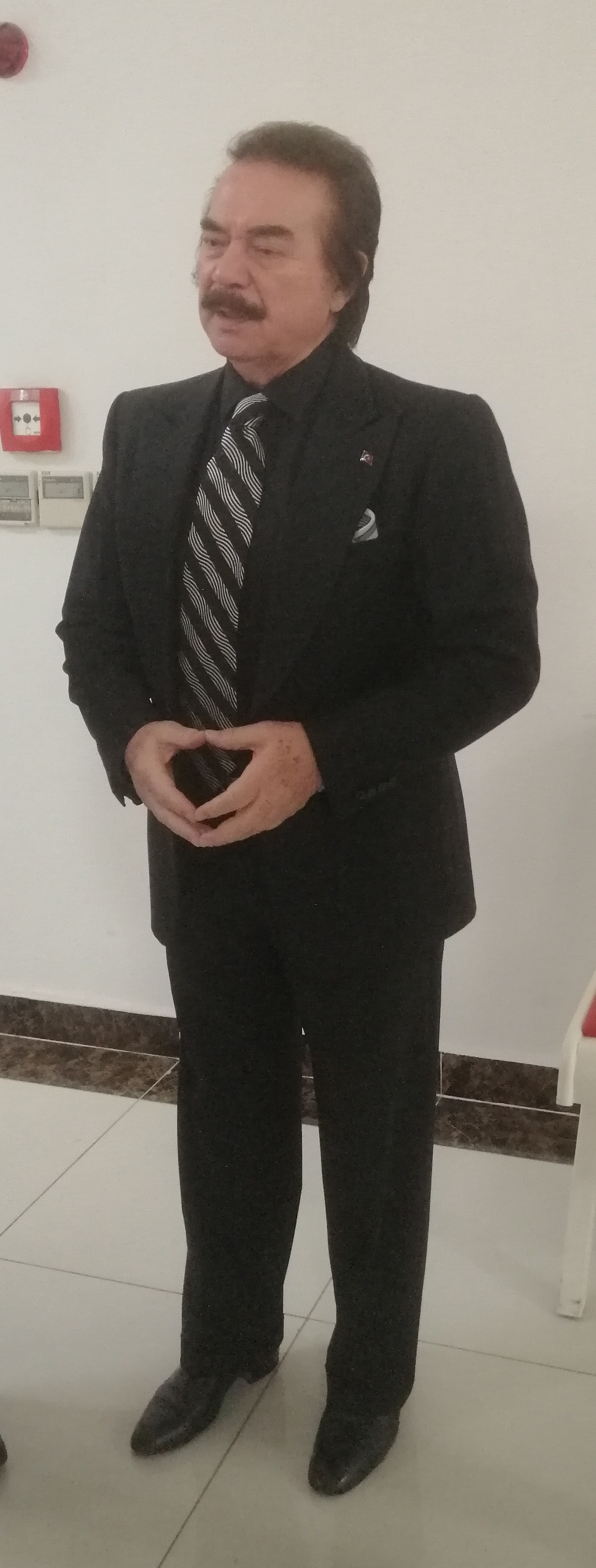

Background information
- Born: Orhan Kencebay; 4 August 1944 (age 82)
- Origin: Tekkeköy, Samsun, Turkey
- Genres: Arabesque music, Turkish folk music, Ottoman classical music, Sufi music, pop folk, folk rock
- Occupations: Singer, composer, music producer, music director, arranger, actor
- Instruments: Bağlama, tambur, violin, sitar, guitar, ney, piano, cümbüş, oud, bouzouki, percussion
- Years active: 1963–present

Orhan Gencebay (born 4 August 1944) is a Turkish musician, bağlama virtuoso, composer, singer, arranger, music producer, music director, and actor. Gencebay was born in the coastal town of Samsun on 4 August 1944. He is of Crimean Tatar descent. In 1998, he was named a State Artist of Turkey.

== Career ==
At ages 20 and 22, he passed the Turkish Radio and Television Corporation (TRT) auditions and became a resident bağlama player at the network for several months. In 1966, he was one of the primary contestants in National Bağlama Contest with Arif Sağ and Cinuçen Tanrıkorur, two other contemporary masters of Turkish music.

In the late sixties, he collaborated with a wide range of musicians in performances and film music. Between 1966 and 1968, he played bağlama with Arif Sağ in many records with singers such as Muzaffer Akgün, Yıldız Tezcan, Gülden Karaböcek, Ahmet Sezgin, Şükran Ay, Sabahat Akkiraz, and Nuri Sesigüzel. Gencebay also took part as a music director in many Turkish films such as Ana, Kuyu, Kızılırmak-Karakoyun. He also collaborated with many musicians from different genres, such as Erkin Koray, Omar Faruk Tekbilek, Ismet Siral, Burhan Tonguc, Ozer Senay, Vedat Yildirimbora, Neşet Ertaş, Abdullah Nail Bayşu. He appeared as a baglama performer and a well-known composer in musical societies, besides releasing several singles in genre of traditional Turkish folk music. In 1968, he released his first "free-style" single "Sensiz Bahar Gecmiyor/Basa Gelen Cekilirmis", and was rewarded. During the 1970s, he released many singles in a new genre that is a fusion of traditional Turkish folk music, Turkish classical music, Western classical music, jazz, rock, country, progressive, psychedelic, Indian, Arabic, Spanish, and Greek music styles. Even though some musical societies such as TRT named that kind of World fusion music recordings Arabesque music, Orhan Gencebay refused the term arabesque, saying it was inadequate to define his style. In 1972, he founded the Kervan Record Company, attracting many other talented musicians such as Erkin Koray, Ajda Pekkan, Muazzez Abacı, Mustafa Sağyaşar, Ahmet Özhan, Kamuran Akkor, Semiha Yankı, Samime Sanay, Neşe Karaböcek, Bedia Akartürk, Nil Burak, Ziya Taşkent, Semiramis Pekkan and Ferdi Özbeğen.

Throughout his career, Orhan has performed leading roles in 36 movies, has been a composer almost in 90 movies, composed of about a thousand works, released almost 35 singles, 15 albums, and dozens of MCs. His albums sold out over 65 million legal copies.

== Discography ==
=== Studio albums ===
- 1969: Musalla Taşı
- 1970: Kaderimin Oyunu
- 1972: Bir Teselli Ver
- 1973: Batsın Bu Dünya
- 1974: Hatasız Kul Olmaz
- 1976: Sarhoşun Biri
- 1978: Benim Dertlerim
- 1979: Yarabbim
- 1980: Aşkı Ben Yaratmadım
- 1980: Ben Topraktan Bir Canım
- 1981: Leyla ile Mecnun
- 1982: Bir Damla Mutluluk
- 1983: Kördüğüm
- 1984: Dil Yarası
- 1985: Beni Biraz Anlasaydın
- 1986: Cennet Gözlüm
- 1987: Akma Gözlerimden
- 1988: Emrin Olur
- 1989: Ya Evde Yoksan
- 1990: Utan - Dokunma
- 1991: Hasret Rüzgarı
- 1992: Sen de Haklısın
- 1993: Hayat Devam Ediyor
- 1994: Yalnız Değilsin
- 1995: Gönül Dostu
- 1996: Kiralık Dünya
- 1998: Cevap Ver
- 2004: Yürekten Olsun
- 2006: Yargısız İnfaz
- 2010: Berhudar Ol
- 2012: Orhan Gencebay ile Bir Ömür
- 2013: Bedensiz Aşk
- 2023: Maske

== Filmography ==
Cinema
Year	Title	Role	Notes
1971	Bir Teselli Ver	Orhan	Orhan Gencebay's cinematic debut.
1972	Sev Dedi Gözlerim	Orhan	
1973	Ben Doğarken Ölmüşüm	Orhan	
1974	Dertler Benim Olsun	Sebahattin	
1975	Batsın Bu Dünya	Orhan	
1975	Bir Araya Gelemeyiz	Orhan	
1976	Bıktım Her Gün Ölmekten	Orhan	
1976	Şoför	Haydar	
1977	Hatasız Kul Olmaz	Orhan Akman	
1978	Derdim Dünyadan Büyük	Orhan	
1978	Çilekeş	Himself	
1978	Aşkı Ben Mi Yarattım	Himself	
1979	Yarabbim	Orhan	
1980	Kır Gönlünün Zincirini	Orhan Gencebay	
1980	Vazgeç Gönlüm	Orhan	
1980	Ben Topraktan Bir Canım	Orhan	
1981	Feryada Gücüm Yok	Orhan Gencebay	
1982	Kördüğüm	Orhan	
1982	Bir Yudum Mutluluk	Orhan	
1982	Leyla İle Mecnun	Kadir	
1983	Zulüm	Orhan	
1983	Kahır	Orhan	
1984	Kaptan	Orhan	
1984	Dil Yarası	Orhan	
1984	Aşkım Günahımdır	Orhan Gencebay	
1985	Doruk	Orhan	
1987	Cennet Gözlüm	Orhan	
1988	Küçüksün Yavrum	Orhan	
1989	Sensiz Yaşıyorum	Orhan Gencebay	
1989	Kan Çiçeği	Orhan	
1990	Utan	Orhan	Orhan Gencebay's last movie appearance.

Movie soundtracks

- Kızılırmak-Karakoyun, 1967
- Kozanoğlu, 1967
- Ana, 1967
- Kuyu, 1968
- Kara Gözlüm, 1970

TV shows

- Orhan Abi Halk Show, presenter, TGRT, 1996–1997
- Popstar Alaturka, judge, Star TV, 2006–2008
- Popstar 2013, judge, Star TV, 2013
