= Coşkun Sabah =

Turkish musician (born 1952)

Coşkun Sabah (b. 16 October 1952, Sur, Diyarbakır) is a Turkish male Arabesque musician. An ethnic Assyrian originally from Diyarbakir, he has composed more than one hundred Turkish songs and from the late 1980s to the early 1990s he attracted a large following, and became known as "the Frank Sinatra of Turkey". Some of his notable songs include "Hatıram Olsun", "Anılar", "Aşığım Sana", "Aşk Kitabı", "Baharı Bekleyen Kumrular Gibi", "Sen Bambaşkasın", "Benimsin", "Gel Gelebilirsen", "İsyanlardayım", "Var mı böyle bir sevda", "Son Buluşmamız", "Bir PazarGünü" and "İşte Bizim Hikayemiz". His best-selling cassette was "Aşığım Sana", which sold three million copies.
