= Neşe Karaböcek =

Turkish singer (born 1947)

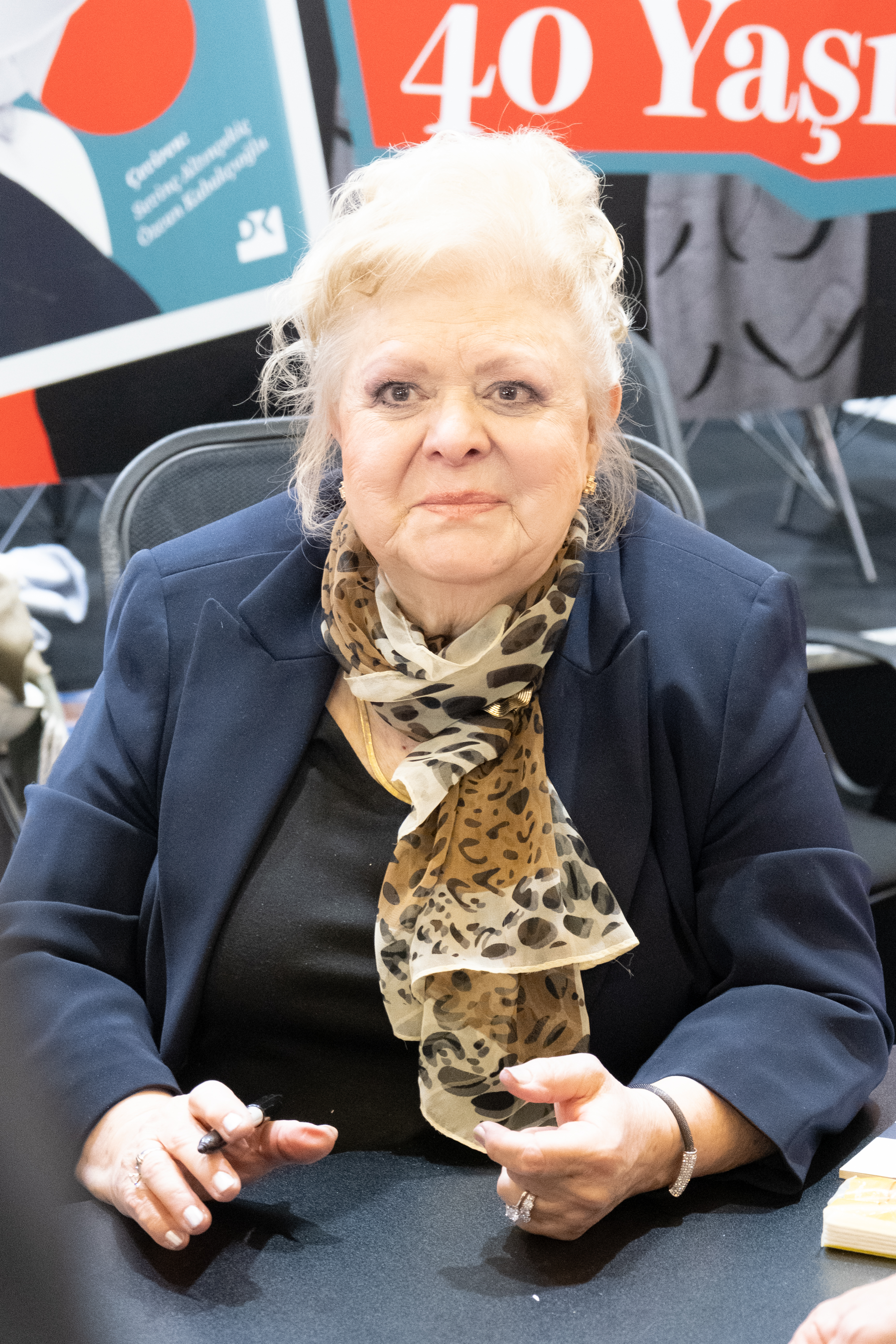
- Born: Neşecan Göktürk; 1 April 1947 (age 79); Istanbul, Turkey
- Occupations: Singer, actress
- Years active: 1953–present

Neşecan Göktürk (born 1 April 1947), better known as Neşe Karaböcek, is a Turkish singer and considered one of the main artists of Turkish Arabesque music, a fusion of traditional Turkish and world music influences and adaptations of international sounds. She also starred in a great number of Turkish films. She was popular from her first release for the single "Artık Sevmeyeceğim" until the mid 1990s with multiple gold and platinum certifications.

== Personal life ==
She started singing at a very young age. Her marriage to musician Atilla Alpsakarya, owner and president of Elenor Plak, produced a son named Alper before they got divorced in 1974. She later married journalist Tevfik Yener with whom she had a second son Hasan.
She is the sister of Gülden Karaböcek, another Turkish singer.

== Discography ==
Major labels that released her albums include Pathe Plak (1961–1965), Alp Plak (1969–1970), As Plak (1971–1973), Kervan Plak (1974–1976).

- 1968: Neşe Karaböcek
- 1969: Uğur Böceği
- 1971: Sensiz Kalan Gönlümde
- 1971: Neşe Karaböcek 1971
- 1972: Büyük Aşkların Kaderi
- 1972: Geri Dönülmez Bir Yoldayım
- 1973: Neşe Karaböcek 1973
- 1974: Neşe Karaböcek 1974
- 1974: Neşe Karaböcek 1974 (Elenor LP)
- 1974: Niyet
- 1974: Ümidini Kirpiklerine
- 1975: Deli Gibi Sevdim
- 1976: Dünden Bugüne
- 1977: Minareci 2 Özel Seri (with Biricik)
- 1978: Uğur Böceği
- 1979: Dost Bahçesi
- 1979: Uzelli 618 (with Ahmet Özhan)
- 1980: Beddua
- 1980: Şu Karşıki Evde Bir Çocuk Doğmuş
- 1981: Canım Dinleyicilerim
- 1982: Yedi Renk
- 1983: Yağmur Altında
- 1984: Kertenkele
- 1985: Avare
- 1985: Telli Telli
- 1986: Arkadaş
- 1986: Çiçek Dağı
- 1986: Dünden Beri
- 1988: Bir Öptüm & Yağmur
- 1988: Süper Arabesk
- 1989: Deliler Gibi - İşte Eyle
- 1989: Dertli
- 1990: Yağmur Ağlıyor
- 1991: Arkadaş (USA)
- 1991: Ateş Benim Kül Benim
- 1991: Uğur Böceği
- 1992: Altın Şarkılar
- 1992: Yam Yam
- 1993: Bir Hüzzam Şarkı Gibi
- 1993: Altın Şarkılar 2
- 1994: Hatırla
- 1995: Cucu - Öp Gizlice
- 1996: Bir Tanem
- 1998: Maşaallah
- 1998-2000: Allah Kerim / Arabesk Kralicesi / Arşiv Serisi - 6 / As Plak LP 1002 / Gönül Dağı / Klasikler LP / Minareci 10 / 7 (on Türküola)
- 2000: Ölmeyen Şarkılar
- 2001: Öldüğümü Unuturum
- 2002: Sabır Allah Sabır
- 2007: Avare
- 2009: Deli Gibi Sevdim (rerelease)
- 2009: Şu Karşıki Evde Bir Çocuk Doğmuş (rerelease)

== Filmography ==
- 1971: Anneler ve Kızları
- 1972: Aşk Sepeti
- 1972: Ah Koca Dünya
- 1973: Sevda Yolu
- 1973: Niyet
- 1973: İntizar
- 1974: Kısmet
- 1974: Almanya'da Bir Türk Kızı
- 1975: Duyun Beni
- 1976: Kuklalar
- 1986: Kertenkele

TV

- 2008: Düğün Şarkıcısı (Canal D, reality television programme, guest star)
