= Bülent Ersoy =

Turkish singer and actress (born 1952)

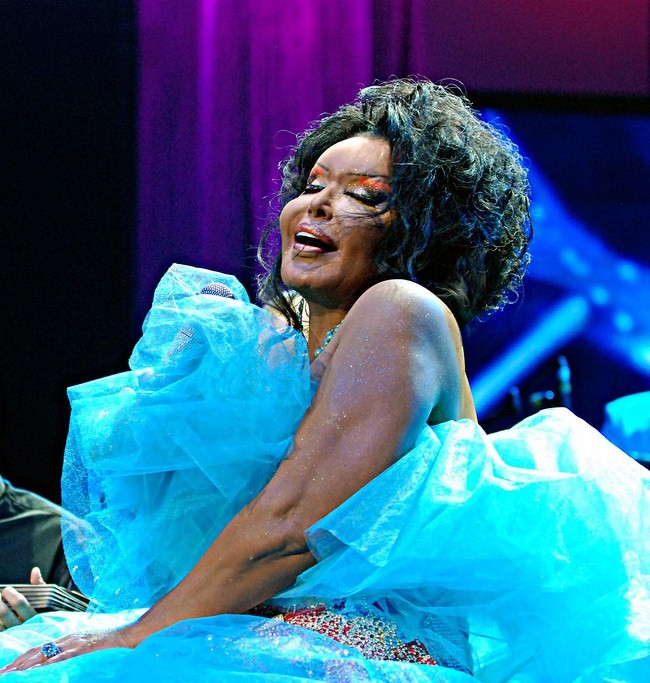
- Bülent Ersoy performing during a concert

Background information
- Also known as: Diva; Abla ("Big Sister")
- Born: Bülent Erkoç; 9 June 1952 (age 74); Istanbul, Turkey
- Genres: Turkish classical music, Arabesque
- Occupations: Singer, actress
- Instrument: Vocals
- Years active: 1970–present
- Spouses: Cem Adler (m. 1998; div. 1999); Armağan Uzan (m. 2007; div. 2008)

Bülent Ersoy (Turkish pronunciation: [byˈlænt ˈæɾsoj]; born Bülent Erkoç on 9 June 1952) is a Turkish singer, actress, and media personality. She is known as one of the most popular singers of Turkish music. Ersoy has many famous hits such as "Ümit Hırsızı" (Hope Thief), "Geceler" (Nights), "Beddua" (Curse), "Maazallah" (God Forbid), "Biz Ayrılamayız" (We Cannot Break Up), and "Sefam Olsun" (I Enjoy Myself). Ersoy has published more than thirty albums so far and has made a name for herself in Turkish music history. She remains an icon of the LGBTQ+ community in Turkey.

== Early life ==
Bülent Erkoç was born on 9 June 1952 in Istanbul as the only son of an urban middle-class family. Her father was from Bursa and her mother was from Trabzon. Neither of them were religious, however despite this she experienced religious guilt as a child, reciting the adhan under tables as a 5-year-old. Ersoy was a well-behaved but sensitive in her youth, who kept to herself for much of her childhood. Both of her parents were bankers, and she was expected to become one as well, being enrolled in Kadıköy Commercial High School.

She was introduced to Turkish classical music by her grandparents, who themselves played the zither and the lute. Showing to have talent from an early age, she took private music lessons with her grandparents, and would later study at the Istanbul Conservatory after graduating from high school. Her former teacher would later claim that she attended the Conservatory for only 2 months. During her education, she took private lessons with prominent classical singers like Melahat Pars and Rıdvan Aytan.

== Music career ==
=== Early career and rise ===
In 1970, she participated in a singing competition organised by the Sunar Concert Bureau and won the first place, alongside a cash prize of ₺1,000 lira and a plaque. Around this period, she experienced her first stage experience at the Özlem Family Gazino (Note: The word "gazino" is often literally translated as "casino", which is misleading. Rüstem Ertuğ Altınay explains: "...nightlife in the big cities, especially Istanbul, mainly consisted of Greek tavernas and nightclubs called gazinos. Those nightclubs provided... hours-long programs bringing together several singers as well as comedians and belly dancers.") in Üsküdar, becoming its lead singer (assolist) and working there for three months. In 1971, she released her first commercial 45 rpm single through the Sanar Plak record label, with this record containing the two songs "Lüzûm Kalmadı" and "Neye Yarar Gelişin", which were originally credited to Muzaffer Özpınar.

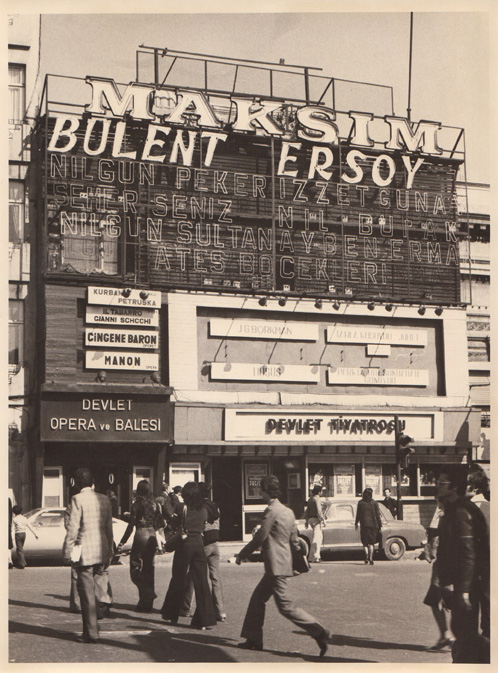
A sign at Maksim Gazino advertising Bülent Ersoy's performances (1970s).

In 1974, Ersoy began singing at the Maksim Gazino in Central Istanbul, where she would release her second classical record, "Tutî-i Mucize Gûyem Ne Desem Lâf Değil", in reference to the Ottoman poet Nef'i. In a period when pop and Arabesque were popular in Turkey, the decision to sing in the classical style stood out, with the record reportedly breaking sales records. The owner, Fahrettin Aslan, would subsequently promote Ersoy to become the assolist lead act of Maksim Gazino, where she began singing professionally under the new surname "Ersoy", meaning "brave lineage", changing it from her original "Erkoç" ("brave ram"), reportedly following Müjdat Gezen's recommendation.

=== Gender reassignment and stage prohibition ===
"Today I am very happy ... Nobody can make me angry. They're in the court right now. I tolerated 8 years of suffering. I'm very happy that justice is served. I won't get involved in the case. Now they are getting tried too. Not because after years their names are being mentioned, and not because they are there [in the court] later, but the fact that their names were mentioned under these conditions and circumstances turned my eight years of torment and anguish into happiness. I'm so happy, nobody can ruin my mood..."

— Bülent Ersoy on her 8-year stage ban and those who were involved in it, 4 April 2012

Ersoy began her transition from male to female around 1979, beginning hormone therapy and presenting herself as a woman, generating massive public attention from conservative Turkish society. In one instance, a Justice Party member of the Turkish Parliament, Ahmet Buldanlı, took the floor and argued that she was "trampl[ing] on the values of honor, chastity, and morality in Turkey", going on to call Ersoy "this goddamned freak". Curiously, he would say in this same speech that Ersoy was "more beautiful than any woman who claims to be beautiful". Buldanlı would then conclude by accusing Ersoy of tax evasion due to her expensive outfits, calling on the government to investigate her. In response, Ersoy would say: "For some reason, Ahmet Bey has fixated on me. Given that he speaks about me when the important problems of the country are at stake, he must have something in mind".

In March 1980, it was announced that Ersoy would undergo gender reassignment surgery, and that her role in the film "Beddua" ("Curse"), being released with an album of the same name, would be her last male role. That same year, she would at some point undergo a breast enlargement surgery, later exposing her new breasts at the İzmir International Fair in August that would lead to her being prosecuted and detained for 45 days. Her first hearing on 2 September would generate front-page headlines over several days, only being overshadowed by the sudden 1980 Turkish coup that brought the conservative Kenan Evren to power. Later that same month, Ersoy would be arrested once more due to drunkenly insulting a judge, reportedly being housed in a separate ward in Buca Prison due to confusion on whether she was a man or a woman. Following the decision in October to show up to her hearings in male clothing instead of female, her prison sentence of nearly a year was suspended due to "good behaviour" in November, only having to pay a fine. In January 1981, she would be forced to sign a statement that banned her from appearing on stage in women's clothing, as part of Evren's wider crackdown on "social deviance".

Already one of Turkey's most popular singers and actors by this point, she gained international notoriety in April 1981 after having her previously announced gender reassignment surgery at Charing Cross Hospital in London, keeping her name "Bülent" despite it being a typically masculine name. That same week of her surgery, an exaggerated semi-autobiographical film "Şöhretin Sonu" ("The End of Fame") would be released, detailing her struggles with gender dysphoria and her transition, paired with the release of her album "Yüz Karası" ("Disgrace").

Following her return to Turkey, she applied to be officially recognised as a female, and following a physical examination that determined there was "no difference from those who are born female and Ersoy", a judge approved her application. However, a public prosecutor appealed this decision in January 1982, leading her case's rejection and eventual retrial by the Supreme Court after six months of inaction. In May 1982, Ersoy was subjected to multiple physical examinations by two new medical authorities as part of her retrial, with them concluding that Ersoy was not a female, but in fact a "male homosexual", resulting in her losing the retrial, and again in 1984. Simultaneously, Ersoy was banned from performing in Istanbul in June 1981 due to "promoting homosexuality", leading to following stage bans in all other cities across Turkey and on TRT, Turkey's only radio and television company at the time. Attempts to lift this ban by Ersoy were rejected by the courts on several occasions, often on paradoxical arguments. These issues facing her would lead to her attempting suicide by overdose in January 1982. She would leave Turkey some time in 1983 in protest of the Evren regime's crackdown against her and to continue performing despite the stage ban within her country.

=== Exile and continued fame ===
Ersoy would continue her music career mainly in West Germany, performing to the growing Turkish community there. She would also tour across the Netherlands, Belgium, and France, and became the first Turkish artist to perform at Madison Square Garden in New York City in 1983. Along with her music, she would make several Turkish movies whilst in exile. Despite her exile, Ersoy would maintain her fame both outside Turkey and within it, despite the government's hostility towards her in this period.

In January 1988, then-Prime Minister Turgut Özal would roll back many of Evren's regressive policies, including Ersoy's stage ban, thus allowing her to return to Turkey that same month. In May, Özal's reforms would also allow for transgender people who had undergone reassignment surgery to legally change their gender, allowing Ersoy to gain her "pink identity card" later that year.

=== The Abla years ===
As soon as she returned to Turkey in January 1988, she launched her "Hasret Konserleri" ("Longing Concerts"), which were free public concerts, held at venues such as the İnönü Stadium, the Ali Sami Yen Stadium, and the Abdi İpekçi Arena, drawing in huge audiences. In August, she would release her album "Biz Ayrılamayız" ("We Cannot Break Up"), which would feature her famous song "Geceler" ("Nights"), marking a new era in her music career. Ersoy's return was welcomed by Turkish society, with many now referring to her as "Bülent Abla", meaning "Big Sister Bülent" in Turkish, showing their acceptance of both her transition and her music career as she became even more popular than before.

On 13 October 1989, Ersoy was performing in İzmir, when ex-member of the Grey Wolves Hacı Tepe requested her to sing the patriotic folk song "Çırpınırdı Qara deniz". When she refused twice, Tepe shot at Ersoy five times, seriously wounding the singer. She would survive her injuries, but lose one of her kidneys. Tepe would be arrested and sentenced to 16 years in prison, with his family disowning him and apologising to Ersoy personally. Tepe, who was released in early October 2006, would later express regret over the incident, saying that it was a "youthful mistake" due to being embarrassed in front of his friends and saying about Ersoy: "She is a doyen, I respect her, I kiss her hands".

The 90s are often considered the period in which her career flourished, and her "Alba" and later "Diva" status was consolidated. She would release multiple albums in quick succession, such as "Öptüm" ("Kisses") in 1990, and "Bir Sen Bir de Ben" ("Just You and Me") in 1991. Her album "Ablan Kurban Olsun Sana" ("Your Big Sister Would Sacrifice Herself for You"), released in 1992, cemented her status as Turkey's "Abla". Other albums like "Sefam Olsun" ("I Enjoy Myself") in 1993 and "Akıllı Ol" ("Be Smart") in 1994 would soon follow. This era of her career was characterised by incorporating the popular pop-Arabesque style into her classical style, especially in albums such as "Ablan Kurban Olsun Sana" and "Sefam Olsun".

In February 1995, she would release the album "Alaturka 95", which was a return to the more classical style she was known for. The song "Aziz Istanbul", which opens the album, included recordings of her reciting the adhan in Arabic. This sparked a fierce and complex debate amongst Muslim clerics and the wider populace, both regarding the use of the Islamic adhan in music and whether she was even permitted to recite the adhan as a transgender woman. That same year, the "Bülent Ersoy Show" would begin, where she became a media personality and culture commentator, alongside often singing duets with other famous Turkish singers on the show. Later that year in December, her album "Benim Dünya Güzellerim" ("My World's Beauties") would be released.

=== From Abla to Diva ===
On 30 March 1997, Ersoy would perform a four-hour long concert with a 50-piece orchestra at the Olympia Music Hall in Paris, performing new songs from her previously unannounced album "Maazallah" ("God Forbid"). Following this performance, the nation of Azerbaijan would grant her the title of "State Artist". Prior to the album's release, Turkish media created mass anticipation for it, enhanced by Ersoy's camp and dramatic persona, generating high pre-orders. The album would be released on 11 April, with the title track "Maazallah" having huge success, with it being noted for its dramatic and theatrical tone. The success of "Maazallah" and her dramatic, and often aggressive, public persona led many to affectionately refer to her as "Diva" from this point on.

=== 2011–12: Aşktan Sabıkalı ===
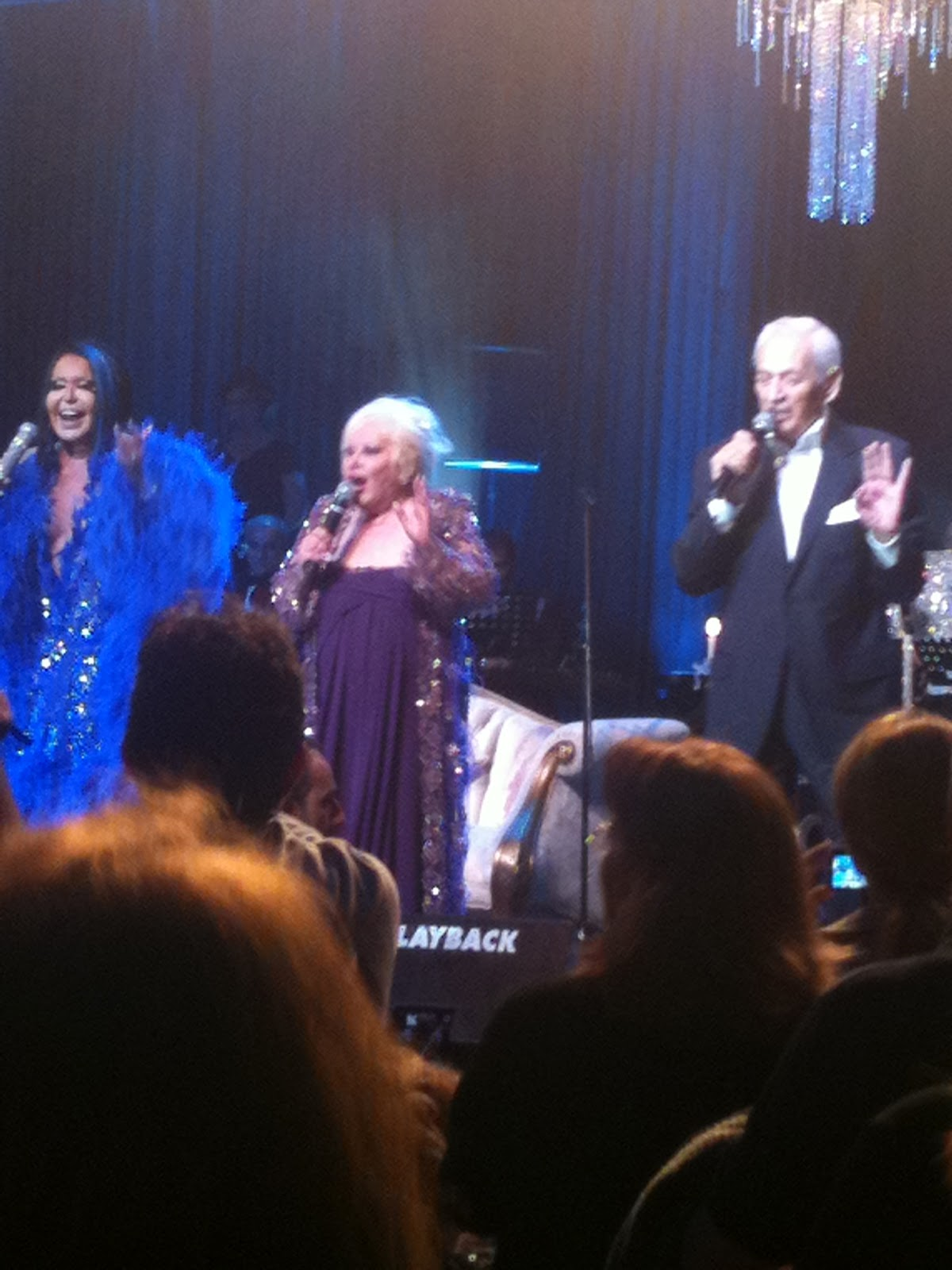
Classical Turkish music artists Bülent Ersoy, Muazzez Abacı and Adnan Şenses, 2012

In late 2010, Ersoy announced that she had listened to nearly 1,500 songs in the last 2 years and found it difficult to choose the best songs for the album. Her new album "Aşktan Sabıkalı" ("Love Convict"), was released on 3 October 2011. The album includes a song written by Can Tanrıyar called "Alışmak İstemiyorum" ("I Don't Want to Get Used to It"), and a classic by Orhan Gencebay: "Bir Teselli Ver", ("Give Me Solace"). There also is a song by Gülşen titled "Aşktan Sabıkalı", after which the album is named. Another piece in the album is a duet sung with Tarkan, titled "Bir Ben Bir Allah Biliyor" ("Only I and God Know"), which was popular as it was performed by two of Turkey's leading artists. On 22 December, Ersoy released a music video for the song, nearly three months after it was first played on the radio.

=== 2013 onwards ===
In her appearances on TRT in 2013, Ersoy was keen to stress that her pop-Arabesque songs were only a 'vice' to earn an income, and Turkish classical music, in which she received her University education in, is where her true allegiance and support lies. Although her last album was released in 2011, her last album where she sang classical and Alaturka (Turkish style) songs was in "Alaturka 2000", after which she hasn't produced any material covering Alaturka or Classical material.

In late 2015, Ersoy stated in a press conference how Orhan Gencebay had mentioned to her that no one prominent had been producing Alaturka for the last couple of years. She stated that it was their mutual plan to 'get together' and think about what to for an album in this area. In early 2016, Ersoy said that she had listened to hundreds of songs and wasn't satisfied with what was brought to her (this being songs in the Pop/Arabesque genre).

In June 2016, Ersoy met with Turkish President Recep Tayyip Erdoğan and shared an iftar meal with him, as part of an event honouring Turkey's musical and artistic community inside the presidential residence. This, ironically, occurred hours after riot police clashed with protestors in Taksim Square following the banning of Istanbul Pride for the second year in a row.

In early August 2017, Ersoy visited the Boudha Stupa in Kathmandu, Nepal, as part of Show TV's "Dünya Güzellerim" ("World Beauties") program. Whilst entering the temple and climbing the steps, she recited the Basmalah several times. Reportedly, many of the locals mistook her for the Buddha and subsequently bowed before her due to her white face makeup and orange sari, with Ersoy saying to them: "Get up, my children, I'm not Buddha or anything like that!"

She announced that she would publish a new song written by Tarkan, named "Ümit Hırsızı", which was released in March 2019.

== Controversies ==
=== The Baykal lawsuit incident ===
In a magazine program in 2005, Ersoy talked about her attempts to end her stage ban and added: "During the period after the 1980 coup, a person who is now a party leader asked me for fortune to remove my stage ban." Following this statement, DYP leader Mehmet Ağar said that he was not the leader in question. As a result, the eyes turned to the CHP leader Deniz Baykal.

Baykal emphasized that at that time he was a lawyer and Ersoy had telephoned to consult him and later met him in person for only 2 minutes. He also added that nothing related to money and fortunes was discussed between the two. In response, Ersoy held a press conference. She claimed that she had met with Baykal personally in an office behind Dedeman Hotel in Ankara and added: "Mr. Deniz even had a gray suit on [during the meeting]. If I remember such details, I can remember you wanted 100 million back then, which is equal to 1 trillion today." She also claimed that the person who mediated the meeting was Mehmet Nabi, the famous mafia figure (known as İnci Baba). In addition, she said that she did not know whether the ₺100 million that Baykal had asked her was a solicitor's fee or that it would be used to distribute bribes to various people to lift the stage ban.

Following this press statement, Baykal filed a lawsuit against Ersoy for the violation of his personal rights due to implications of both bribery and mafia involvement allegations. At the end of the case, the court fined Ersoy, but when she objected to the decision, the case was moved to the Court of Cassation. On 25 March 2008, the Court of Cassation upheld the decision of the local court and ordered Ersoy to pay ₺15,000 along with its interest to Baykal for causing non-pecuniary damages.

=== Comments on Armenians and Azerbaijanis ===
In January 2007, Turkish-Armenian journalist and minority rights activist Hrant Dink was assassinated by a 17-year-old Turkish nationalist, with over 100,000 attending his funeral in Istanbul and chanting "Hepimiz Ermeniyiz!" ("We are all Armenians!"). Following this, STR's "Popstar Alaturka", a singing reality television series, opened with the popular folk song of highly contested origin "Sari Gelin" in Dink's honour. Ersoy, who was part of the judge panel of the show, commented on these recent events, saying that as "the Muslim daughter of Muslim parents" it would be wrong to call herself an Armenian, and therefore a Christian. She would later argue that she "didn't make a statement that went beyond the bounds of propriety" and therefore did not need to apologise to anyone.

Later that same year in November, Ersoy would claim that the Azerbaijani people were "a people of unknown origin", and arguing that "Sari Gelin" was an Armenian folk song despite its contested origin, causing anger in both Turkey and Azerbaijan. Both Turkish actress Meral Konrat and Azerbaijani singer Azerin called for Ersoy to publicly apologise for her "insulting" and "derogatory" remarks towards the Azerbaijani people. Ersoy would later state that her views had been distorted, and that she never claimed "Sari Gelin" was Armenian, going on to say that she has a "deep respect" for Azerbaijan and believes it and Turkey to be "one nation, two states".

=== Views on compulsory military service ===
Ersoy sparked controversy again in February 2008 when she publicly criticised Turkey's incursion into Iraqi Kurdistan on "Popstar Alaturka", and said she "would not send her sons to war" if she were a mother. An Istanbul public prosecutor subsequently filed charges against her for "turning Turks against compulsory military service", an issue which had also brought prominent Turkish intellectual Perihan Mağden to trial in the past. The Turkish Human Right Foundation (IHD) stood up to Ersoy's defence. During a September court appearance, fans and supporters protested outside, carrying signs that read "Long Live the Diva!". On 19 December 2008, Ersoy was pronounced not guilty of charges by a Turkish court.

=== Anıtkabir umbrella incident ===
On 12 January 2022, Ersoy visited Anıtkabir, the mausoleum of Turkey's founder Mustafa Kemal Atatürk, ahead of a concert in the capital Ankara. The team commander at Anıtkabir accompanied Ersoy in her wheelchair, holding an umbrella over her due to the rain. Images of this caused public outcry on social media, with many arguing that military personnel should not be performing personal services for a civilian like Ersoy. In response, the Ministry of National Defence launched an investigation into the incident and announced on 14 January that "the Anıtkabir Commander and the team commander... have been removed from their posts", being reassigned to other positions. Ersoy denied that she requested any special treatment, and stated that she disagreed with the Ministry's decision.

=== Caddebostan Adhan controversy ===
In November 2022, Ersoy claimed that she had invited the muezzin of her local mosque to her Caddebostan apartment, after hearing him recite the adhan incorrectly, to give him a lesson in correct recitation. She also said that she would go to her window and recite the adhan with him each time, but denied claims that she had shouted at the muezzin from her window. She also stated that "this incident happened a long time ago. That muezzin passed away and is no longer alive". In response, the Imam of the Mihrimah Sultan Mosque stated that he and the muezzins of the mosque denied Ersoy's story and that it was "impossible", as the adhan was broadcast via a central system "for 17 years".

=== Accusations against Zeki Müren ===
In January 2024, when asked if she or Zeki Müren was greater, Ersoy would say that whilst Müren was a talented and respectable artist, he was "ruthless and jealous". She would allege that Müren would call her "Japon Çiçeği" ("the Japanese Flower", in reference to Ersoy's style and facial features), and that he said "Oh God, take the life of this Japanese [wo]man" when musical legend Müzeyyen Senar reportedly expressed support for Ersoy, claims which she has made previously. She would go on to allege that Müren was "ruthless" to his employees, using corporal punishment against them, and that he had purposely died out of jealousy. Müren's niece, Özlem Güner, would deny Ersoy's claims, stating that she and her uncle never talked about Ersoy, and that Müren was not jealous of anyone. Güner would then say that: "There will always be those who want to profit from such a great figure. Those who can't get attention in any other way try to get attention by using his name".

== Personal life ==
=== Relationships ===
Ersoy's first marriage was to Cem Adler (born 1979 or 1980), a businessman from İzmir. The two met in Istanbul, and were married on 4 April 1998. The relationship generated much public scrutiny due to Adler being 27 years younger than Ersoy. The couple would officially divorce on 22 June 1999, with Ersoy citing Adler's infidelity as the cause. In 2016, Adler would claim that he was forced into the marriage by his mother, who herself was close to Ersoy at the time. In 2023, Ersoy would claim that she had caught Adler in bed with another woman in the spring of 1999.

Ersoy's second marriage was to Armağan Uzun (born 1981), a wedding singer from Torbalı. The two met because Uzun was a contestant on "Popstar Alaturka", where Ersoy was a judge, and their relationship developed quickly and publicly. They were married on 7 July 2007 in Çeşme. The celebrity couple similarly experienced much public attention and scrutiny due to Uzun being 29 years younger than Ersoy. The couple would officially divorce in April 2008 due to "severe incompatibility". In 2018, Uzun would once again appear on "Popstar Alaturka" before Ersoy, with the televised meeting being tense. In 2023, Ersoy would similarly claim that their divorce was due to Uzun's infidelity.

In February 2011, it was revealed that Ersoy was in a relationship with her driver, Berk Yılmaz (born 1990). Once again, the couple were subject to intense media scrutiny due to Yılmaz being 38 years younger. Despite announcing that they had broken up in March 2012, Ersoy would later state in December 2013 that she and Yılmaz had "been together for 4.5 years". She would also state that she does not intend to marry again.

=== Religion ===
Ersoy has stated that she is a practicing Muslim, having believed in Islam since her youth. She is known for partaking in Ramadan and Friday prayers.

== Discography ==
Albums

- 1974: Tutî-i Mucize Gûyem Ne Desem Lâf Değil
- 1975: Şöhretler
- 1975: Konser 1
- 1976: Toprak Alsın Muradımı
- 1976: Bir Tanrıyı Bir de Beni
- 1976: Konser 2
- 1977: Konser 3
- 1978: Orkide 1
- 1978: Ölmeyen Şarkılar (Immortal Songs)
- 1979: Orkide 2
- 1979: Meyhaneci (The Innkeeper)
- 1980: Beddua (Curse)
- 1981: Mahşeri Yaşıyorum
- 1981: Yüz Karası (Disgrace)
- 1983: Ak Güvercin (White Dove)
- 1983: Ne Duamsın Ne De Bedduam (You Are Neither My Prayer Nor My Curse)
- 1984: Düşkünüm Sana
- 1985: Yaşamak İstiyorum
- 1986: Anılardan Bir Demet
- 1987: Suskun Dünyam
- 1988: Biz Ayrılamayız (We Cannot Break Up)
- 1989: Avustralya Konseri
- 1989: İstiyorum
- 1989: Seçmeler
- 1989: Bizim Hikayemiz
- 1990: Öptüm
- 1991: Bir Sen Bir de Ben
- 1992: Ablan Kurban Olsun Sana
- 1993: Türk Sanat Müziği Konseri 1
- 1993: Türk Sanat Müziği Konseri 2
- 1993: Türk Sanat Müziği Konseri 3
- 1993: Türk Sanat Müziği Konseri 4
- 1993: Şiirlerle Şarkılarla
- 1993: Sefam Olsun (I Enjoy Myself)
- 1994: Akıllı Ol
- 1995: Alaturka 1995
- 1995: Benim Dünya Güzellerim
- 1997: Maazallah (God Forbid)
- 2000: Alaturka 2000
- 2002: Canımsın (My Darling)
- 2011: Aşktan Sabıkalı (Guilty of Love)
- 2018: Alaturka

Singles

- "Dolmamış Çilem" (1980)
- "Ümit Hırsızı" (2019)
- "Leyla Bir Özge Candır" (EP, 2020)
- "Sorma Ne Haldeyim" (2025)
- "Fragman" (2026)

== Filmography ==
=== Film ===
- Sıralardaki Heyecan (1976)
- Ölmeyen Şarkı (1977)
- İşte Bizim Hikayemiz (1978)
- Beddua (1980)
- Söhretin Sonu (1981)
- Acı Ekmek (1984)
- Asrın Kadını (1985)
- Tövbekar Kadın (1985)
- Benim Gibi Sev (1985)
- Efkarlıyım Abiler (1986)
- Yaşamak İstiyorum 1 (1986)
- Yaşamak İstiyorum 2 (1986)
- Kara Günlerim (1987)
- Biz Ayrılamayız (1988)
- Anılar (1989)
- İstiyorum (1989)

=== Television ===
- Bülent Ersoy Show (1995–1996; 2013–2014) – Presenter
- Bülent Ersoy'la Hatırla Bakalım (2005) – Presenter
- Popstar Alaturka (2007–2009) – Judge
- Beyaz Show (2012) – Guest
- Arkadaşım Hoşgeldin (2015) – Guest appearance
- Bu Tarz Benim (2015) – Guest judge
- Var Mısınız Yok Musunuz (2016) – Contestant
- Dünya Güzellerim (2017) – Herself
- Çukur (2017) – Guest appearance
- Popstar 2018 (2018) – Judge
- Kuaförüm Sensin (2020) – Judge
- Benzemez Kimse Bize (2021) – Presenter
- Dünya Güzellerim Masada (2023–2024) – Herself
- Dünya Güzellerim Tatilde (2024–2025) – Herself

== See also ==
- List of Turkish musicians
- Music of Turkey
