= Kutsi (singer) =

Turkish singer and actor

- Born: Ahmet Kutsi Karadoğan; 16 March 1973 (age 53); Malatya, Turkey
- Genre: Turkish pop
- Occupations: Singer, composer, songwriter, actor
- Instruments: Guitar
- Years active: 2000–present
- Labels: Erol Köse Production (2000–2010); Poll Production (2010–)
- Spouse(s): Sinem Bayraktutar (m. 2008; div. 2015) Sibel Ülker (m. 2021)

Ahmet Kutsi Karadoğan (born 16 March 1973), often known as Kutsi, is a Turkish singer, composer, songwriter and actor. His first two names have been given to him from the poet Ahmet Kutsi Tecer.

== Biography ==
Born in Malatya but he was raised in Ankara, where he started to gain fame too, but the proper fame story begins with him playing Accordion at the Bora Bar in Didim. Kutsi's introduction to music was when he won some money from scratch to win and he bought his first guitar.

== Career ==
In 1992, he came to Istanbul with a small album that had all songs written and composed by himself but failed to attract the attention of producers. Determined, Kutsi didn't give up and continued to work with music and he managed to get the attention of the producer Erol Köse and, in a record amount of time 26 days, he managed to create his first album: Aşk Payını Aldı ("Love had its share").

He actually managed to show himself in 2005 with his album Sana Ne ("What's it to you?"). In the period of time, he made some songs for Nalan, Berksan and others. He later made a duet with Petek Dinçöz. During this time, He managed to create and host a show in, one of Turkey's best music channels, Kral TV ("King TV") and named it İlan-ı Aşk ("An old Ottoman Turkish term meaning to display love") and manage to keep in between hosting and music at, literally, the same time.

In 2006, he gained some experiences in acting as well as he took part in the Turkish version of Grey's Anatomy, named Doktorlar ("Doctors"). He made his third album, Aynı Şehirde Nefes Almak Bile Bana Yetiyor ("It's enough for me to even breath in the same city as you") and continue to climb the ladder in his music career. The reason why this album stood out more than the others is because all the instruments and all the songs were recorded live with no alternation with computers or any other electronic instruments. This album was under the direction of, Osman İşmen and also with the help of Istanbul State Symphony Orchestra.

At the summer of 2008, the album he released Aynadaki Yüzünün Karşılığı Benim "I am the reflection of you in the mirror") managed to become the first place in music lists. The album consist of several hit songs which contributed to the career of Kutsi in a good manner.

He is currently one of the three surviving members left in the program that is shown on Show TV, Korolar Carpışıyor ("Chorus' Collide") other than Öykü and Berk and Rojin.

== Discography ==
=== Albums ===
- Aşk Payını Aldı ("Love had its share") (2000)
- Sana Ne ("What's it to you") (2005)
- Kördüğüm ("Blindchain") (2006)
- Aynı Şehirde Nefes Almak Bile Bana Yetiyor ("It's enough for me to even breath in the same city as you") (2007)
- Aynadaki Yüzünün Karşılığı Benim ("I am the reflection, in the mirror, of you") (2008)
- Bambașka ("Completely different") (2010)
- Bilmem Anlatabildim mi? ("I do not know, was I able to explain?") (2013)
- Kutsi En İyiler (Akustik) ("Best of Kutsi (Acoustic)") (2023)

=== Singles ===
- "Yaz Günü" (2014)
- "Aşıklar Şehri" (feat. Zara) (2016)
- "Söz Konusu Aşk" (feat. Meral Kendir) (2016)
- "Beşiktaşım Benim" (2016)
- "Kalbimdeki Deniz" (2016)
- "Hayranım Sana" (2020)
- "Sen Misin Tek Deli" (2021)
- "Hayatımın Anlamı" (feat. Zara) (2021)
- "Gayrı" (2022)

=== Music Videos ===
- Soran Yok ("Nobody asked")
- Sana Ne
- Geçer ("Pass")
- Aşkın Gururu ("Honour of Love")
- Doğum Günü ("Birthday")
- Kördüğüm
- Hediyem Olsun ("Let it be my present")
- Olay Olacak Aşkımız ("Our love is going to be an incident")
- Aynı Şehirde Nefes Almak Bile Bana Yetiyor
- İlan-ı Aşk
- Aynadaki Yüzünün Karşılığı Benim

=== Charts ===
Album	Single	Peak
Album	Single	Turkey
Aynadaki Yüzünün Karşılığı Benim	Aynadaki Yüzünün Karşılığı Benim	18
Aynadaki Yüzünün Karşılığı Benim	Aşık Olmaya Yemin Ediyorum ("I am swearing to be in love")	12

== Filmography ==
Television
Year	Title	Role
2006–2011	Doktorlar	Levent Atahanlı
2009–2010	Kahramanlar	Yiğit Özkan
2012–2014	Huzur Sokağı	Bilal Ocak
2013	Veliaht	judge
2015	Beyaz Yalan	Demir Güner
2016	Kırgın Çiçekler	guest appearance
2016–2018	Kalbimdeki Deniz	Mirat Yavuz
2019–2021	Benim Adım Melek	Halil Şirhan
2021–2022	Annemizi Saklarken	Dündar Demir
2023	Üvey Anne	Faruk
2026	Tuzlu Kahve	Doctor
Film
Year	Title	Role
2011	Yan Yana	Mustafa
2015	Zilin Sesi	Tarkan Hoca
2022	Buğday Tanesi	Serkan Bayram
2025	Sihirli Annem: Hepimiz Biriz	Gogo
