= Ferhat Tunç =

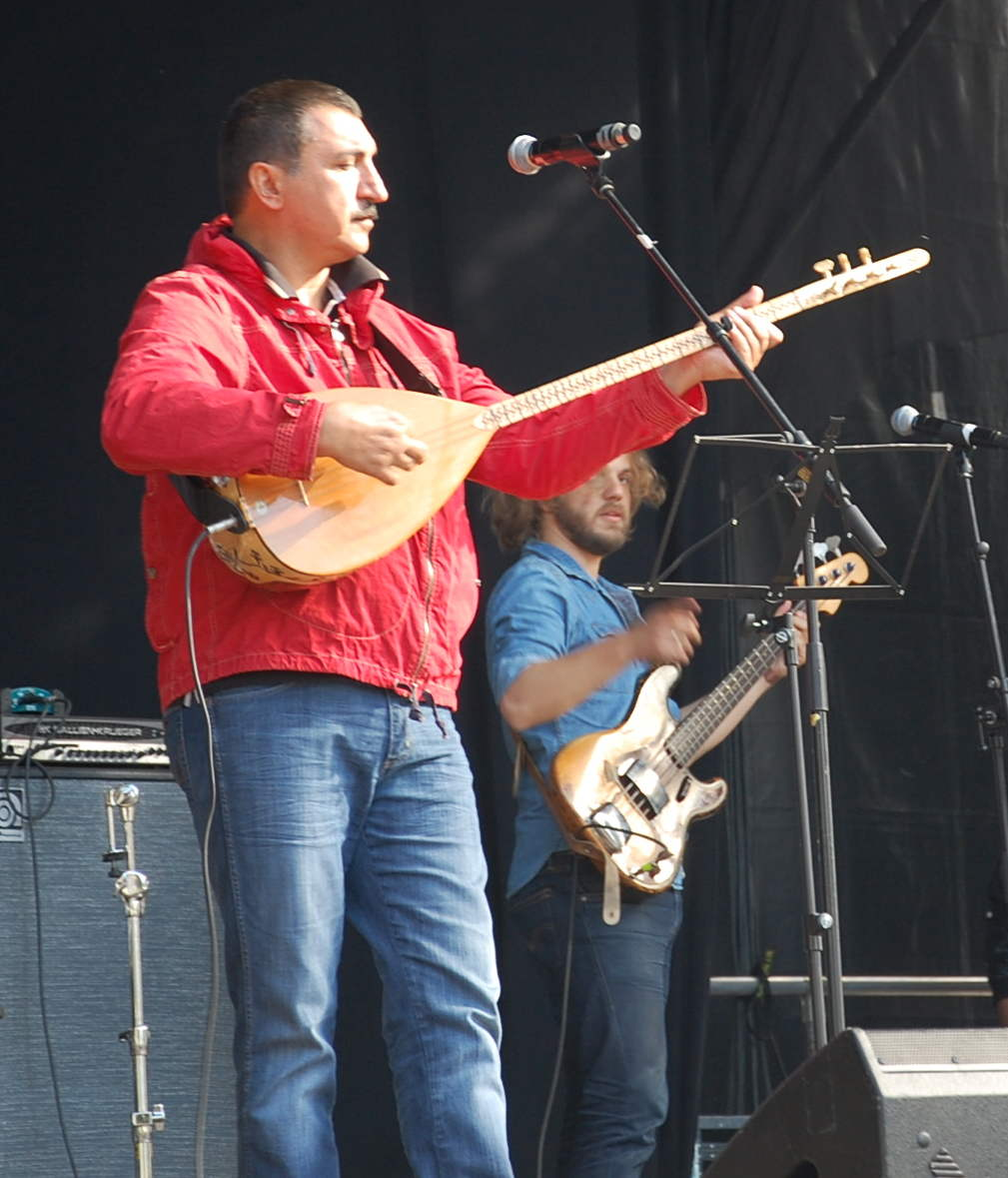
- Tunç in Oslo, August 2012

Background information
- Born: Ferhat Tunç Yoslun; 14 March 1964 (age 62); Ovacık, Tunceli, Turkey
- Origin: Kurdish
- Genres: Turkish folk music, Kurdish folk music, Alevite folk music, Protest songs
- Occupations: Singer, songwriter, musician
- Instruments: Bağlama, Vocal
- Website: www.ferhattunc.net

Ferhat Tunç Yoslun (born 14 March 1964) is a singer of Kurdish descent.

Ferhat Tunç was born in 1964 in the city of Tunceli in Turkey's eastern province of Tunceli. With twelve years he stood for the first time on stage as a singer. In the late 1970s with sixteen years, he followed his father to Germany. He returned to Turkey in 1985 and began to engage himself in favor of Kurdish rights.

== Legal prosecution ==
In June 2012, he was sentenced to 2 years in prison for terror related charges because during a speech in Dersim on 1 May 2011 Tunç said: “I greet you all in the revolutionary spirit of Deniz Gezmiş, Mahir Çayan and İbrahim Kaypakkaya." All three he greeted are Turkish leftist. On the 20 December 2012 the sentence was turned into a three-year ban to speak about the same theme.

On the 25 September 2018, he was sentenced to 1 year 11 months and 11 days in prison for terror propaganda on behalf on the YPG, PKK and KCK due to his social media posts during the fighting between ISIL and Kurdish fighters in Kobanî in 2014 and 2015.

In March 2019, he declared on Twitter that he was leaving Turkey due to the ongoing legal prosecution against him.

== Discography ==
- "Kızılırmak" in Germany (1982)
- "Bu Yürek Bu Sevda Var İken" in Germany (1984)
- "Vurgunum Hasretine" (1986)
- "Ay Işığı Yana Yana" (1987)
- "Yaşam Direnmektir" (1988)
- "İstanbul Konserleri-1" (1988)
- "Vuruldu" (1989)
- "Gül Vatan" (1990)
- "Ateş Gibi" (1991)
- "İstanbul Konserleri-2" (1992)
- "Firari Sevdam" (1993)
- "Özlemin Dağ Rüzgarı" (1994)
- "Kanı Susturun" (1995)
- "Kayıp" (1997)
- "Kavgamın Çiçeği" (1999)
- "Her Mevsim Bahardır" (2000)
- "Şarkılarım Tanıktır" (2002)
- "Nerdesin Ey Kardeşlik" (2003)
- "Sevmek Bir Eylemdir" (2005)
- "Ateşte Sınandık" (2006)
- "Çığlıklar Ülkesi" (2009)
- "Listen to the Banned" (2010)
- "Kobanî" (2016)

== Honor ==
- 3 March World Freemusic Award winner by Censorship of music- in London's Royal Institute of British Architects, 25 March 2010
