= Ümit Besen =

Turkish musical artist (born 1956)

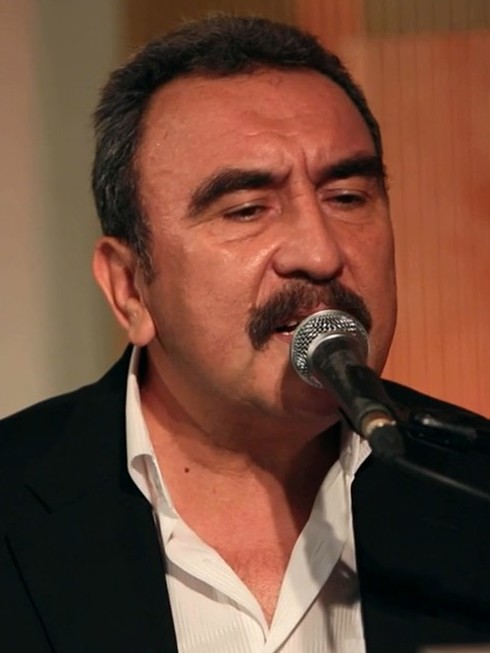
- Ümit Besen in 2013

Background information
- Born: Ali Ümit Besen; 14 October 1956 (age 69); Osmaniye, Turkey
- Genres: Arabesque, Fantasy
- Occupations: Singer-songwriter, musician
- Instruments: Keyboards, synthesizer, Piano
- Years active: 1973–present

Ümit Besen (born 14 October 1956) is a Turkish musical artist. He started his professional career by playing keyboards and singing with his band at the local clubs in Adana, Southern Turkey. While he was in the army for his compulsory military service, a brigadier-general liked his style and appointed him to sing at the officers' mess.

== Rising popularity ==
After the completion of his 18 months service he returned to Adana. While singing and playing to make his living one day Turkish football legend Metin Oktay visited the club he was working at. Amazed by the power of his voice and his knowledge of synthesizers, Metin Oktay recommended him to his club owner friends in Istanbul.

In Istanbul, he kept playing at famous clubs and finally he was teamed up with songwriters Selami Şahin and Ahmet Selçuk İlkan to record his first LP. The result was not only a commercial success.

== Today ==
In 2015, the unforgettable hit of the 80's "Nikah Masası" was made into a duet with Ajda Pekkan with the accompaniment of the Enbe Orchestra.

In 2016, Ümit Besen re-released his classical songs in a rock style album Başka under the label DMC, in which he performed duets with famous Turkish singers such as Feridun Düzağaç, Pamela, and Cem Adrian. Ümit Besen has also been featured on the rock songs of many singers including Teoman, Mirkelam, Emre Aydın, Manga, Yüksek Sadakat, Pinhani, Grup Seksendört, and Leyla The Band. Umit Besen, who won the acclaim of critics with the slow love songs he sang in the 80's, gave an emphasis to the different spirit of that period by saying in an interview with Hakan Gence from Hürriyet that if his song "'Nikah Masası' would have not become a hit" if it was released now.

== Works ==
=== Discography ===
- Şalak trust (1980)
- Islak mendil (1981)
- Bayramın Olsun (1982)
- İkimizin Yerine (1982)
- Dostlar Sağolsun (1983)
- Yıkılan Gurur (1984)
- Bir Akşam Üstü (1984)
- Vazgeçtim Senden (1985)
- I Love You (1986)
- Deli Gönlüm (1987)
- Halk Konseri 1 (1987)
- Aşk Burcu (1988)
- Müzikli Bir Masal (1989)
- Bir Tanesin Sen (1990)
- Son Şarkı (1991)
- Gökkuşağı (1992)
- İkimiz De Sevdik (1993)
- Görüşürüz (1994)
- Yalnız Kaldım (1995)
- Yağmur Var Gözlerimde (1996)
- Hadi Git (1997)
- Nostalji (1998)
- Bizim Hikayemiz (2000)
- Dokunsalar Ağlarım (2001)
- O Gece (2003)
- Ben Bu Gece Ölmezsem (2006)
- İyi Günde Kötü Günde (2008)
- Garaj Konserleri (2013)
- Ümit Besen 2014 (2014)
- Başka (2016)
- Ümit Besen ile Başka Sahne (2019)

=== Filmography ===
- Islak Mendil (1982)
- Nikah Masası (1982)
- Dostlar Sağolsun (1983)
- Yıkılan Gurur (1984)
- Sevmek Yeniden Doğmak (1984)
- Bir Akşam Üstü (1985)
- Unutursun Diye (1985)
- Vazgeçtim Senden (1985)
- Seni Seviyorum (1986)
- Sevda Rüzgarı (1986)
- Ağlama (1988)
- Şoför Parçası (1987)
- Baba Yüreği (1987)
- Olur Olur (2014)
