= Okan Ersoy =

American computer scientist

Okan Kadri Ersoy
- Born: 5 September 1945 (age 80); Istanbul, Turkey
- Citizenship: Turkish American; Turkey, United States
- Education: Boğaziçi University, Istanbul
- Known for: Digital signal/image processing and imaging; Diffractive optics with scanning electron microscope; Fourier-related transforms and time-frequency methods; Neural networks, decision trees and support vector machines; Optical communications
- Spouse: Nihayet Dal Ersoy
- Children: Ole Kaan, Lillian Ayla, Devin Attila
- Scientific career
- Fields: Lasers, Quantum Electronics, Optics and Image Processing
- Workplaces: Purdue University, W. Lafayette, Boğaziçi University, Istanbul; Univ. of California at Los Angeles

Okan Kadri Ersoy (born 5 September 1945) is now Professor Emeritus of electrical engineering Formerly, he was a professor of electrical engineering and the director of the Statistical and Computational Intelligence Laboratory at Purdue University, West Lafayette School of Electrical and Computer Engineering. He is a Fellow of IEEE, a Fellow of OSA and a Fellow of ISIBM. Ersoy contributed to the research and education in computer science and engineering, physics, artificial intelligence and bioinformatics.

== Biography ==
Ersoy was born on 5 September 1945, in Istanbul, Turkey. He received B.S.E.E. degree from Boğaziçi University (Formerly Robert College) in Istanbul in 1967; M.S.E.E. degree in 1968, MS degree in Systems Science and PhD in Electrical Engineering in 1972 respectively, all from University of California at Los Angeles (UCLA) with specialization on lasers, quantum electronics, optics and image processing.

== Research areas ==
His current research is concentrated in the fields of digital signal/image processing and imaging, neural networks, decision trees and support vector machines, optical communications, networking and information processing, diffractive optics with scanning electron microscope, Fourier-related transforms and time-frequency methods, probability and statistics. He has written a number of books and book sections on signal, image processing and fast transforms.

== Books ==
- Diffraction, Fourier Optics and Imaging - Fourier Related Transforms and Applications
