= Kıraç =

Kıraç is a Turkish name and surname that means “wilderness”. Notable people with the surname include:

== People ==
- Kıraç (singer) (born 1972), Turkish musician
- Cahit Kıraç (born 1956), Turkish politician
- Güven Kıraç (born 1960), Turkish actor
- Seval Kıraç (born 1988), Turkish women's footballer

== Arts ==
- Abbreviation of Keeping It Real Art Critics
