= Muazzez Ersoy =

Turkish singer (born 1958)

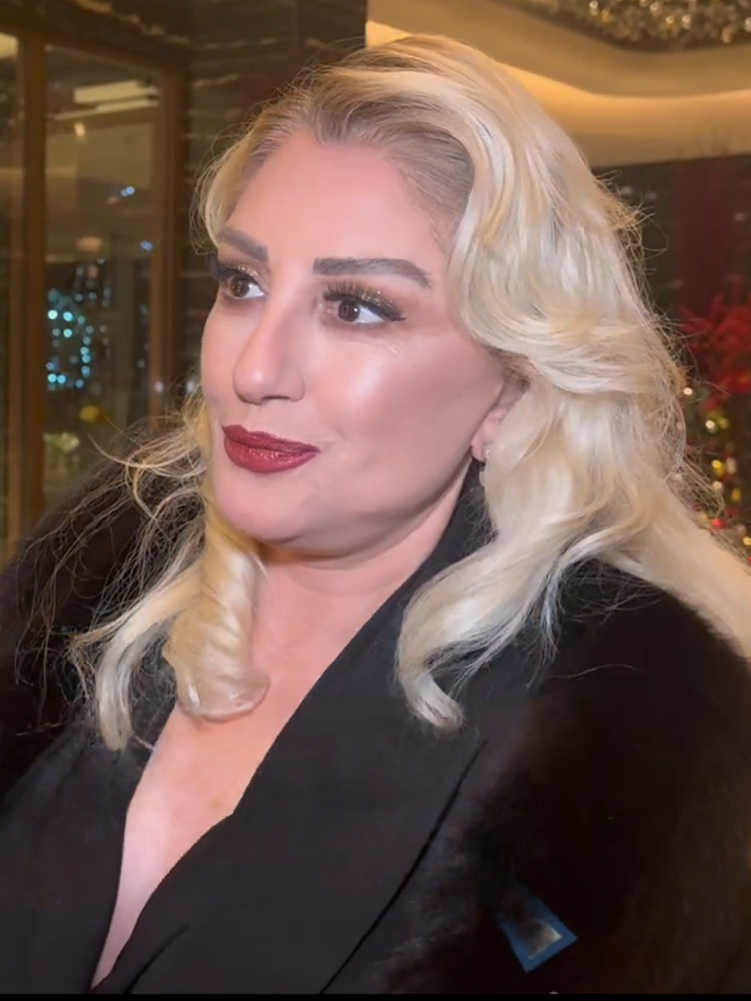
- Ersoy in 2024

Background information
- Also known as: Nostalgia Queen
- Born: Hatice Yıldız Levent; 9 August 1958 (age 67); Uzunköprü, Edirne, Turkey
- Genres: Turkish classical, Pop, Arabesque
- Instruments: Vocals
- Years active: 1982–present
- Labels: Elenor Müzik (1991–1992); Raks Müzik (1993); Levent Müzik Yapım (1994–2000); DMC (2002, 2013–present); Avrupa Müzik (2004–2006); Öncü Müzik (2007–2010)
- Website: MuazzezErsoy.net

Hatice Yıldız Levent, better known by her stage name Muazzez Ersoy, (born 9 August 1958) is a Turkish classical music singer. In 1998, with the suggestion of the 33rd government of Turkey's Ministry of Culture, she was chosen as a State Artist. Due to singing nostalgic songs, she is also known with the title "Nostalgia Queen" inside Turkey. In 2006, she was chosen as a goodwill ambassador for United Nations High Commissioner for Refugees.

Ersoy spent her childhood and early adulthood in Kasımpaşa, Beyoğlu. Muazzez's paternal family roots are in Kastamonu, a city in the Western Black Sea region. She has previously given concerts as part of Kas-Der (Kastamonu Solidarity Association) and filmed a music video in Tosya district of Kastamonu. She became initially interested in music due to her mother's affinity for music. This passion of her mother influenced Ersoy during her youth, and after finishing secondary school, she decided to continue her studies by taking music lessons. She took lessons from music teachers such as İrfan Özbakır and Baki Duyarlar. She did a «clerkship» and spent her savings on music lessons.

Ersoy, who achieved great sales with her nostalgia album series, recently rerecorded the pop songs that were released in the 90s. In the album titled “90’dan POP”, Ersoy performed the songs of Tarkan, Sezen Aksu, Serdar Ortaç, Yıldız Tilbe, Harun Kolçak, Eda and Metin Özülkü, and released the first music video of the album for Serdar Ortaç's song "Değmez".

She also hosted the TV program "Yıldız Akşamı" on TRT Müzik.

== Discography ==
=== Studio albums ===
Year	Album	Sales	Producer	Ref
1991	Seven Olmaz Ki	400,000	Elenor Plak	
1992	Her Şeyim Sensin	600,000	Elenor Plak	
1993	Sizi Seviyorum	500,000	Raks Müzik	
1994	Sensizlik Bu	500,000	Levent Müzik	
1994	Seninle Olmak	750,000	Levent Müzik	
1995	Nostalji	1,200,000	Levent Müzik	
1996	Nostalji 2	1,700,000	Levent Müzik	
1997	Nostalji 3	1,100,000	Levent Müzik	
1998	Nostalji 4-5-6	1,500,000	Levent Müzik	
1999	Nostalji 7-8-9	2,000,000	Levent Müzik	
2000	Nostalji 10-11-12	1,000,000	Levent Müzik	
2002	Senin İçin	300,000	DMC	
2004	Seni Seviyorum	210,000	Avrupa Müzik	
2006	Nankör	70,000	Avrupa Müzik	
2007	Kraliçeden Nostaljiler	20,000	Öncü Müzik	
2010	Mozaik	67,000	Öncü Müzik	
2013	Şarkılarla Gel	115,000	DMC	
2016	90'dan Pop	2,006,178	DMC	

=== Singles ===
Year	Single	Producer	Ref
2022	"Aşk Versin Kararını" (with Yücel Arzen)	Poll Production	
