= İbrahim Erkal =

Turkish singer, composer and actor (1966–2017)

- Born: 10 October 1967; Narman, Erzurum Province, Turkey
- Died: 11 May 2017 (aged 49); Ümraniye, Istanbul, Turkey
- Occupations: Singer; musician; songwriter; composer; actor
- Spouse: Filiz Akgün (m. 2003)
- Children: 3
- Musical career
- Genres: Arabesque; Turkish folk; Fantezi
- Instruments: Oud; Bağlama; Mandolin; Flute; Tambur; Ney; Guitar; Organ; Darbuka
- Years active: 1984–2017
- Labels: Ulus; Camses; Söz Müzik; Poll
- Website: www.ibrahimerkal.com.tr

İbrahim Erkal (10 October 1967 – 11 May 2017) was a Turkish male folk music and classical music artist, musician, singer, songwriter, composer and actor. Under the name İbrahim Güzelses, he released his first album in 1984. İbrahim Erkal released his first album under his own name in 1986 with the name Sensiz Yaşıyamam.

== Career ==
In 1993, he released Tutku, and in 1995 Sıra Bende/Aklımdasın. His third album, Gönlünüze Talibim, was released in 1996. The album has sold 1.4 million copies. Erkal was among the best-selling musicians of 1996 in Turkey and "Canısı" was one of the most popular songs. In 1997, he starred in the TV movie Canısı. The film ranked first in the ratings. In 1997, he played in the TV series based on the same movie. His fourth album, Sırılsıklam, was released in 1998. It sold 2.2 million copies, and was the second best-selling album of 1998 in Turkey. Erkal starred in a TV series at the end of 1998.

In 2000 he published the album De Get Yalan Dünya, selling 1 million copies. Su Gibi (2001), Aşknâme (2002), Gönül Limanı (2004) and Yüreğinden Öpüyorum/Gülüm (2006) were all released under the Ulus Music label. In 2006, he left Ulus Music and released two albums afterwards. In 2015 he published his album Nefes 1.

== Death ==
On 12 April 2017, Erkal lost his balance due to low blood pressure and hit his head against the floor and suffered a cerebral hemorrhage. He was hospitalized and put under intensive care. On 9 May, it was reported that he had been diagnosed with brain death, yet the vital functions of his heart and other organs were sustained, depending on the external life support. Erkal died on 11 May 2017 at Ümraniye Eğitim ve Araştırma Hospital in Istanbul. On 13 May 2017, his funeral was held at Marmara İlahiyat Mosque and his body was later buried at Karacaahmet Cemetery.

== Discography ==
- Sarhoş Baki (1984)
- Sensiz Yaşıyamam (1986)
- Tutku (1993)
- Sıra Bende/Aklımdasın (1995)
- Gönlünüze Talibim (1996)
- Sırılsıklam (1998)
- De Get Yalan Dünya (2000)
- Su Gibi (2001)
- Aşknâme (2002)
- Gönül Limanı (2004)
- Yüreğinden Öpüyorum/Gülüm (2006)
- Aranağme (2008)
- Burnumda Tütüyorsun (2011)
- Nefes 1 (2015)
- Ömrüm (2017)

Other albums

- Ölümüne Cim Bom (1994) - "for Galatasaray"

== Filmography ==
Film

- Canısı (1997)

Television

- Canısı (1997–98)
- Sırılsıklam (1998–99)
- Cennet Mahallesi (2006) "Guest cast"

== Awards ==
Year	Award	Category	Result
1996	2nd Kral Video Music Awards	Arabesque - Fantasy Best Male	Nominated
1997	3rd Kral Video Music Awards	Song of the Year (Canısı)	Nominated
1997	3rd Kral Video Music Awards	Best Lyric (Canısı)	Won
1997	3rd Kral Video Music Awards	Arabesque - Fantasy Best Male	Won
1997	3rd Kral Video Music Awards	Best composition (Canısı)	Nominated
1997	25th Golden Butterfly Awards	Best Male Arabesque-Fantezi Soloist	Won
1998	İstanbul FM Music Awards	Best Male Arabesque-Fantezi Soloist	Won
1999	MGD Golden Objective Awards	Music Star of the Year	Won
2001	7th Kral Video Music Awards	Arabesque - Fantasy Best Male	Nominated
2002	8th Kral Video Music Awards	Arabesque - Fantasy Best Male	Nominated
2003	9th Kral Video Music Awards	Arabesque - Fantasy Best Male	Nominated
2017	44th Golden Butterfly Awards	Best Male Arabesque-Fantezi Singer	Nominated
