= Sinan Özen =

- Born: 1 March 1964 (age 61); Çayeli, Rize Province
- Occupation: Singer; Songwriter; Composer
- Language: Turkish; Spanish
- Education: Istanbul Academy of Music
- Genre: Pop; Folk; Arabesque
- Years active: 1989-present
- Spouse: Burcu Kartal (2016-present)

Website
- www.sinanozen.com.tr/2022/index.php

Sinan Özen (pronounced [sinan œzæn]; born 1 March 1964, in Çayeli, Rize Province) is a Turkish folk music artist, composer, and songwriter.

== Early life ==
Sinan Özen was born in the Çayeli district of Rize. At a young age his family moved to İzmit where he spent a few years of his childhood. Then they moved to Istanbul where Sinan graduated from his primary and secondary education. He then continued his education in Rize, at the Department of Lathe-Leveling in the Rize Industrial Vocational High School. Following this, Sinan Özen decided to leave this profession, and embark on a career in music.

== Career ==
From a young age, Sinan Özen always had a passion for music, and his first attempt to start his singing career was in 1981, where he participated in a song contest that was advertised in a local newspaper. Sinan ultimately won the contest, but despite this, it did not lead to any further offers or opportunities.

He later met Süheyla Altmışdört, a tutor in the Academy of Music, with the help of his musician friend, who taught him instrumental and solfeggio classes. He also had instrumental Oud and Solfeggio training from Irfan Ozbakir, a Turkish composer. In 1982 Sinan was encouraged by his tutors to apply to the Istanbul Academy of Music, where he was accepted in the Department of Turkish Classical Music in 1982, where he studied until he finally graduated from the academy in 1988.

His professional career began when he released his first album Rüyalarım Olmasa (“If I Didn't Have My Dreams”) in 1989. Sinan Özen has since produced produced 18 albums including one Turkish classical music album and 28 singles.

== Discography ==
=== Singles ===
- 2023 Zaman Zaman (From Time to Time)
- 2023 Her Aşka Bir Deli Lazım (Every Love Needs a Madman)
- 2023 Unutamadim (I Couldn't Forget)
- 2023 Suç Mahallini (The Scene of the Crime)
- 2022 Et Tirnaktan Ayrı Olur Mu (Can Flesh Be Separated from the Nail?)
- 2022 Gönlümü Alırım (I Take My Heart)
- 2022 Zor Sevdam (Difficult to Love)
- 2021 Her Gece Yarasi (Wounded Every Night)
- 2021 Keyfim Yerinde (I'm in a good mood)
- 2021 Sen Treni Kaçırdın (You Missed The Train)
- 2021 Sen Mühimsin (You Matter)
- 2021 Körpe Yüreğim (Young Heart)
- 2021 Yerim Gözde Yıldızım (I Love My Precious Star)
- 2020 Yok Arkadaş Feat. Amad (No, Friend)
- 2020 Seni Düşünüyorum (I'm Thinking of You)
- 2020 Sinan Özen İle Akustik (Acoustic With Sinan Ozen)
- 2019 Adım Adım (Step By Step)
- 2019 Yaralı Kara Sevda (Injured Dark Passion)
- 2019 Ben Yanıyorum (I am Burning)
- 2018 İki Kor (Two Blind Ones)
- 2018 İkimizde Var (It's in Both of Us)
- 2018 Sevgilim Feat. Dilso'z (My Love)
- 2017 Öpsene Beni (Kiss Me)
- 2016 Sana Birşey Olmasın (May Nothing Happen to You)
- 2016 Haram Geceler (Sinful Nights)
- 2013 Yıkılır İstanbul (Istanbul Falls)
- 2015 Sevişmeliyiz (We Should Make Love)
- 2003 Quiero Comer Tus Labios (I Want to Eat Your Lips)

=== Albums ===
- 2016 Bambaşka (Different)
- 2014 Babamın Şarkıları ve İnce Saz (My Father's Songs and Thin Saz)
- 2011 Usta (Master)
- 2010 Sinan Özen 2010
- 2007 Ödün Vermem (I Won't Back Down)
- 2006 Gitsem Uzaklara (If I Could Go Far Away)
- 2006 Aşkın S Hali (The S State of Love)
- 2004 Islak Islak (Wet, Wet)
- 2002 Serseri Gönlüm (My Wreckless Heart)
- 1998 Tek Başına (Alone)
- 1997 Evlere Şenlik (A Feast For The Houses)
- 1996 Sigaramın Dumanı Sen (You Are The Smoke Of My Cigarette)
- 1994 Kapına Gül Bıraktım (I Left a Rose at Your Door)
- 1993 Ölürüm Yoluna (I Would Die For Your Journey)
- 1992 Öpsene Beni (Kiss Me)
- 1991 Aşık Olmak İstiyorum (I Want To Fall in Love)
- 1990 Kar Tanesi (Snowflake)
- 1989 Rüyalarım Olmasa (If I Didn't Have My Dreams)

=== Music videos ===
- Radyoda Bir İnce Saz (Fine Saz on Radio)
- Yıkılır İstanbul (Istanbul Will Fall)
- Ben Seni Sevdim (I Fell in Love with You)
- Teessüf Ederim (I Feel Sorry)
- Yaşamak (To Live)
- Çok Ama Çok (So Much)
- Bişey Olmaz Deme (Don't Tell Nothing Gonna Happen)
- Bilemiyorum (Don't Know)
- Sana Kıyamam (Unable To Be Heartless To You)
- Seni Düşünüyorum (Thinking About You)
- Canım Yandı (I Got Hurt)
- Ödün Vermem (I Cannot Give Over)
- Seni Öyle Çok (Love You So Much)
- Koptuğu Yerde Bırak (Leave It)
- Ellerini Bırak (Leave Your Hands)
- Sildim (I Have Crossed You)
- Islak Islak (Wet)
- Kulağımdan Öp Beni (Kiss My Ears)
- Yatiya Geldim (Came To Stay Overnight)
- Uyusun Da Büyüsün (Sleep and Grow)
- Gülüm (My Rose)
- Ezanlar Bizim İçin (Azans are For Us)
- Hazalım (My Fallen Leaf)
- Çaresizim (Desperate)
- Ağlayamadım (I Couldn't Cry)
- Sigaramın Dumanı Sen (Be My Cigarette Smoke)
- Vicdansızlar (Unscrupulous)
- Başımın Tatlı Belası (My Sweet Curse)
- Evlere Şenlik (Goodness Me)
- Senin Ağzını Yerim (I Wanna Eat Your Lips)

=== Filmography ===
- Gecenin Işıltısı (Sparkle of the Night)
- Arka Sokaklar 2. Sezon (Back Streets 2. Season)
- Tirvana
- Kurasların Efendisi (The Lord of the Cuirass)
- Sinan Özen Söylüyor (Sinan Ozen Sings)
