= Esin Engin =

Turkish actor and musician

Background information
- Born: May 17, 1945; Sivas, Turkey
- Died: May 4, 1997 (aged 51) Istanbul, Turkey
- Genres: Turkish pop, folk, tango
- Occupations: Composer, score composer, arranger, musician
- Instruments: String instruments, vocals
- Years active: 1968–1996
- Label: EMI Turkey

Esin Engin (May 17, 1945 – May 4, 1997) was a Turkish musician, composer, arranger and film actor.

== Biography ==
He was born in Sivas, Turkey in 1945 to a family of Crimean Tatar origin. He graduated from North Collins High School in New York, US in 1963. Then he returned to Turkey and completed a journalist degree in Istanbul in 1968.

== Discography ==
- Modern Oyun Havaları (1973)
- Anadolu (1973)
- Dünden Bugüne (1974)
- Modern Oyun Havaları 2 (1975)
- Oyun Havaları, Vol. 1 (1989)
- Oyun Havaları, Vol. 2 (1995)
- Çiftetelli – Oyun Havaları, Vol. 3
- Oyun Havaları, Vol. 4 (1996)
- Film Müzikleri, Vol. 1 (1995)
- Film Müzikleri, Vol. 2 (2000, posthumous album)
- Film Müzikleri, Vol. 3 (2000, posthumous album)
- Modern Fasıl (1978)
- Nostaljik Fasıl (1992)
- Tangolar (1974, reissued in 1996)
- Son Tango (1998, posthumous album)
- Best of Belly Dance from Turkey
- Nostalgic Russian Tzigane (1990)
- Gypsy Fire (1990)
- Best of Russia

== Filmography ==
=== Film score composer ===
- Kanlı Nigar (1981)
- Adile Teyze (1983)
- Çalıkuşu (1986)
- Yeniden Doğmak (1987)
- Hayallerim, Aşkım ve Sen (1987)
- Tek Başına Bir Kadın (1988)
- Sürgün (a.k.a. "The Banishment") (1992)
- Tatlı Betüş (1993)

=== Actor ===
- Seven Ne Yapmaz (1970)
- Dert Bende (1973)

== See also ==
- Music of Turkey
- Turkish pop music
