= Ahmet Selçuk İlkan =

Turkish poet and songwriter (born 1955)

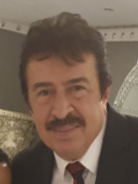
- Born: 26 October 1955 (age 70); Adana, Turkey
- Occupation: Poet

Ahmet Selçuk İlkan (born 26 October 1955) is a Turkish poet and songwriter.

== Life ==
After high school, İlkan went to Berlin to study architecture and engineering. Later he developed an interest in poetry and enrolled in the Faculty of Language and Literature of Istanbul University.

== Published works ==
=== Books ===
- Ayrılıkların Şairi (Poet of Breakups)
- Yakılacak Şiirler (Poems That Will Be Burned)
- Adım Yalnızlık Benim (My Name Is Loneliness)
- Gitmeler Bana Kaldı (Stay By Me)
- Bir Gülü Sevdim (I Loved a Rose)
- Erkekler Hep Yalnız Ağlar (Men Always Cry Alone)

=== Albums ===
- Mum Işığında (Ayten), 1982
- Şiir Gözlüm (Fahriye Abla), 1984
- Bak Bir Erkek Ağlıyor, 1986
- Bir Beyaz Karanfil, 1988
- O Adam Benim, 1990
- Seni Arıyorum (Allah Kahretsin), 1992
- Şairler Ağlamaz, 1997
- Ayrılıkların Şairi (Sen Vurdun da Ben Ölmedim mi), 2000
- Yakılacak Adam, 2002
- Unutmaktan Geliyorum (Senin Adın Yalan Olsun), 2004
- Seni O Kadar Çok Sevdim Ki (Kanatsa Da İçimi), 2011

== Awards ==
İlkan's poem "Do you remember?" won first prize in a poetry competition sponsored by Life magazine in 1975
