= Muazzez Abacı =

Turkish singer (1947–2025)

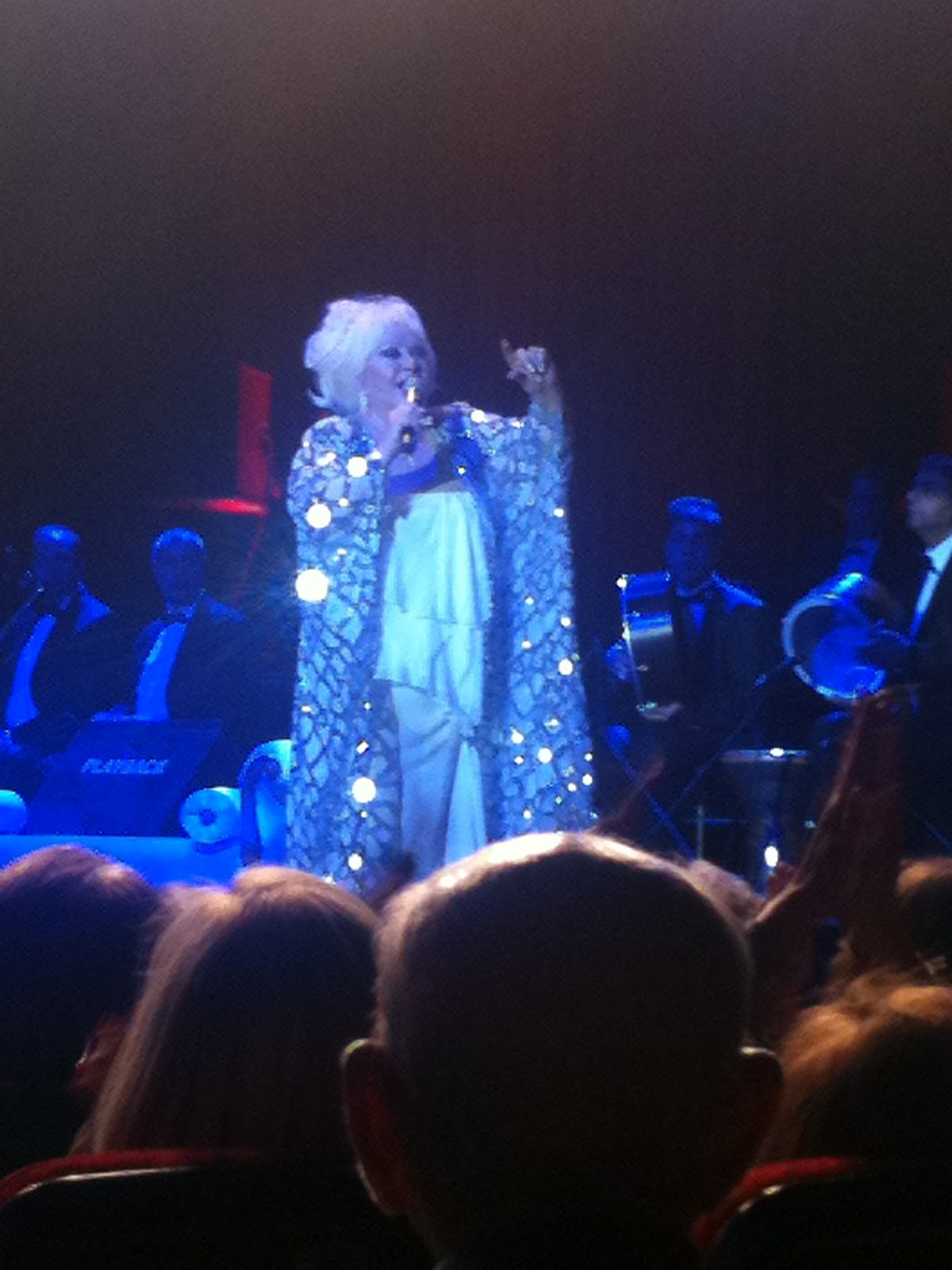
- Abacı performing in 2012

Background information
- Born: Hicran Muazzez Altıok; 12 November 1947; Ankara, Turkey
- Died: 12 November 2025 (aged 78) Rochester, New York, U.S.
- Genres: Turkish classical music
- Occupation: Singer
- Instrument: Vocals
- Years active: 1973–2025
- Labels: Kervan Plak, As Plak, Yavuz Asöcal, Fono Müzik, Yaşar Kekeva, Raks Müzik, Klip Müzik, DMC

Hicran Muazzez Abacı (Turkish pronunciation: [hidʒˈɾan muazˈzez abaˈdʒɯ]; 12 November 1947 – 12 November 2025) was a Turkish singer. Trained in Turkish classical music, she achieved considerable popular success in the Turkish Classical Music genre. She was active from 1973 until 2025, with a silent period between 2002 and 2012. Abacı was awarded the State Artist title in 1998 on the recommendation of the Ministry of Culture and Tourism (Turkey). Abacı died from multiple organ failure following a cardiac arrest, on 12 November 2025, her 78th birthday. She was buried at Cebeci Asri Cemetery in Ankara on 17 November 2025.

== Awards ==
- State Artist (awarded in 1998)

== Discography ==
=== Studio albums ===
- Muazzez Abacı Söylüyor (1975)
- Ölümsüz Eserlerle Muazzez Abacı (1975)
- Dönüş (1978)
- Yasemen (1981)
- Muazzez Abacı Söylüyor (1982)
- Sevdiklerinizle Muazzez Abacı 83 (1983)
- Geceler ( 1986)
- Şakayık (1986)
- Söyleme Bilmesinler (1987)
- Felek (1989)
- Vurgun (1990)
- Sensiz Olmadı (1991)
- Efendim (1992)
- Kar Yangınları (1994)
- Güller Arasında (1994)
- Tutkunum (1995)
- Cesaretim Var (1998)
- Muazzez Abacı & Zeki Müren Düet (1998)
- Hükümlüyüm ( 2001)
- Bir Efsanedir (2013)
- Ajda Pekkan & Muazzez Abacı (2014)

== death ==
Artist Abacı, who traveled to the United States to see her daughter in October 2025, suffered a heart attack on October 28, 2025.It was announced that the artist, who had been hospitalized in Rochester, underwent a heart stent procedure and was moved to a regular room,,It was reported that the artist was suffering from kidney complications and that her treatment would continue in intensive care on November 5. She died on her birthday, November 12, 2025. A memorial service was held for Abacı, whose body was transported to Türkiye, at the Atatürk Cultural Center on November 16, 2025. The Minister of Culture and Tourism delivered speeches.Mehmet Nuri Ersoy, and artists Emel Sayın, Orhan Gencebay, and Muazzez Ersoy, delivered eulogies during the ceremony. The funeral of Muazzez Abacı was held on Monday, November 17, at the Ankara Kocatepe Mosque, after the noon prayer, and he was buried in the Cebeci Asri Cemetery.

== See also ==
- Turkish music
