= Arabesque (Turkish music) =

Genre of Turkish music

Arabesque music
- Stylistic origins: Arabic music; Turkish folk music
- Cultural origins: 1940s, Turkey

Subgenres
- Arabesque pop; arabesque rock; technobesque

Other topics
- Ottoman classical music

Arabesque (Turkish: Arabesk) is a style of Turkish music popular in Turkey, the Balkans, the Caucasus, the Middle East, and Eastern Europe. The genre was particularly popular in Turkey from the 1960s through the 2000s. Its aesthetics have evolved over the decades and into the 2010s. It often includes the bağlama and Middle Eastern music. Arabesque music is mostly in a minor key, typically in varieties of the Phrygian mode; it heavily features themes that tend to focus on issues of longing, strife, and desire.

== Description and history ==
A very small percentage of arabesque is exclusively instrumental. For the great majority of it, a singer lies at the center of the music. Male singers dominated the genre in its early years, but female singers probably predominated during its peak years of popularity. Simultaneously, with the influx of female singers, the sound grew more dancey and upbeat.

Suat Sayın is generally considered the founder of the genre. Other well-known older singers are Orhan Gencebay, Ferdi Tayfur, Müslüm Gürses, and Hakkı Bulut. One of the most prolific and commercially successful is İbrahim Tatlıses, who broke all sales records in Turkey in 1978 and continues to turn out popular music to this day. He has maintained popularity in the arabesk scene in recent years through remixing his tracks into dance-friendly club tracks. The pure arabesque album “Acıların Kadını” (tr: woman of pains) by the singer Bergen was the bestselling album in Turkey in 1986 and may be fairly labelled one of the classic albums of the genre. Bergen had several other hit arabesque albums during the 1980s. Other singers include Ebru Gündeş, Seda Sayan, and Sibel Can. The singers Muazzez Ersoy and Bülent Ersoy designate themselves as modern exponents of Ottoman classical music. Zerrin Özer also made arabesque albums between 1982 and 1988, including her album “Mutluluklar Dilerim,” released in 1984. One of the important names of arabesque musicians who died in 2000 was Ahmet Kaya and another of the names died in 2012 was Azer Bülbül. Another of the important names of arabesque music died in 2017 was İbrahim Erkal.

A common theme in arabesque songs is the highly embellished and agonizing depiction of love and yearning, along with unrequited love, grief, and pain. This theme had undertones of class differences in early 1960-70s, during which most of the genre's followers , mostly working-class to lower middle-class , identified themselves. Turkish composer Fazıl Say has repeatedly condemned and criticized the arabesque genre, equating the practice of listening to arabesque “tantamount to treason”.

== See also ==
- Kanto
- Skiladiko
- Mizrahi music
- Filmi
- Longa (Middle Eastern music)
