= List of Turkish musicians =

This is a list of Turkish musicians, musicians born in Turkey or who have Turkish citizenship or residency.

== Before 20th century ==
=== 600s Born ===
- Dede Korkut

=== 800s Born ===
- al-Farabi

=== 1200s Born ===
- Yunus Emre
- Safi al-Din al-Urmawi

=== 1300s Born ===
- Abd al-Qadir Maraghi

=== 1400s Born ===
- Bayezid II

=== 1500s Born ===
- Solakzade Mehmed Hemdemi
- Hasan Can Çelebi
- Kadri Çelebi

=== 1600s Born ===
- Reftar Kalfa
- Buhurizade Mustafa Itri
- Benli Hasan Ağa
- Ali Ufkî Bey
- Ebuishakzade Mehmed Esad Efendi
- Hafız Post
- Murad IV
- Dimitrie Cantemir
- Amcazade Köprülü Hüseyin Pasha
- Osman Dede

=== 1700s Born ===
- Dilhayat Kalfa
- Hammamizade İsmail Dede Efendi
- Selim III
- Mahmud II
- Gevrekzâde Hasan Efendi
- Tab'î Mustafa Efendi
- Abdülhalim Ağa
- Basmacı Abdi Efendi
- Abdi Efendi
- Abdülaziz Efendi
- Hampartsoum Limondjian
- Zaharya Efendi Mir Cemil
- Abdulbaki Nasir Dede

=== 1800s Born ===
- Abdulaziz
- Ahmet Âlim Efendi
- Ahmet Irsoy
- Aşık Veysel Şatıroğlu
- Bülbül
- Celal Güzelses
- Deniz Kızı Eftalya
- Dikran Çuhacıyan
- Edgar Manas
- Hacı Faik Bey
- Faruk Kaleli
- Feryâdî Hafız Hakkı Bey
- Hacı Arif Bey
- Macar Tevfik
- Mahmud Celaleddin Paşa
- Mehmed Abdülhalim Paşa
- Menâpirzâde Nuri
- Nigoğos Ağa
- Osman Zeki Üngör
- Peruz
- Rifat Bey
- Şemseddin Ziya Bey
- Şerif Muhiddin Targan
- Şevki Bey
- Suphi Ezgi
- Tamburi Ali Efendi
- Tamburî Cemil Bey
- Yusuf Ziya Pasha
- Zekai Dede Efendi
- Zeki Arif Ataergin

== 1900 Born ==
- Münir Nurettin Selçuk

== 1901 Born ==
- Picoğlu Osman

== 1902 Born ==
- Âşık Ali İzzet Özkan
- Selahattin Pınar

== 1904 Born ==
- Gevheri Sultan
- Ahmet Şefik Gürmeriç

== 1906 Born ==
- Emin Ongan
- Halil Söyler
- Ferdi Statzer

== 1907 Born ==
- Ahmet Adnan Saygun
- Zeki Duygulu

== 1908 Born ==
- Necip Celal Andel

== 1909 Born ==
- Cemil Cankat
- Suzan Lütfullah

== 1910 Born ==
- Semiha Berksoy
- Kemal İlerici
- Mustafa Çağlar

== 1911 Born ==
- Kemal İpşir
- Suzan Yakar Rutkay

== 1912 Born ==
- Hasan Tunç
- Toto Karaca

== 1913 Born ==
- Seyyan Hanım
- Semahat Özdenses

== 1914 Born ==
- Bülent Tarcan

== 1915 Born ==
- Melek Kobra

== 1916 Born ==
- Fethi Tevetoğlu
- Saadet İkesus Altan

== 1917 Born ==
- Safiye Ayla
- Ahmet Çelik
- Aydın Gün

== 1918 Born ==
- Müzeyyen Senar
- Melahat Pars
- Niyazi Koyuncu

== 1919 Born ==
- Bülent Arel

== 1920 Born ==
- Abdullah Yüce
- Recep Birgit
- Hacı Kurban Süleymani
- Ahmet Yakupoğlu

== 1921 Born ==
- Şecaattin Tanyerli
- Darío Moreno
- Selmi Andak
- İlham Gençer
- Fikret Şeneş

== 1923 Born ==
- Ahmet Ertegün
- Yusuf Nalkesen
- Bülent Oran
- Faruk Yener

== 1924 Born ==
- Mualla Mukadder Atakan
- Ayhan Aydan
- Tarık Çıkıntaş

== 1925 Born ==
- Ahmet Faik Şener
- Ahmet Üstün
- Muzaffer Akgün

== 1926 Born ==
- Arif Sami Toker
- Hasan Mutlucan
- Ahmet Yamacı
- Nigar Uluerer
- Cemile Cevher Çiçek
- Nezahat Bayram
- Adnan Ataman

== 1927 Born ==
- Fecri Ebcioğlu
- Sabite Tur Gülerman

== 1928 Born ==
- Evlin Bahçeban
- Leyla Gencer
- Sevinç Tevs
- Armağan Şenol
- Kadriye Latifova
- Baki Çallıoğlu

== 1929 Born ==
- Ayten Alpman
- Nida Tüfekçi
- Rüştü Demirci
- Aysel Gürel
- Kazancı Bedih
- İsmet Yazar
- Yaşar Güvenir
- Necla Erol
- Güzide Kasacı

== 1930 Born ==
- Saniye Can
- Muvaffak "Maffy" Falay
- Necdet Yaşar

== 1931 Born ==
- Nesimi Çimen
- Zeki Müren
- Şükran Ay
- Yaşar Turna
- Rüçhan Çamay
- Bahattin Çamurali

== 1932 Born ==
- Çekiç Ali
- Seyfi Dursunoğlu
- Arif Mardin
- Mustafa Sağyaşar
- Şerif Yüzbaşıoğlu
- Alaeddin Şensoy

== 1933 Born ==
- Yaşar Kayahan
- Behiye Aksoy
- Teoman Alpay
- Ahmet Özdemir
- Suphi Kaner
- Necdet Tokatlıoğlu
- Metin Bükey
- Cemil Demirsipahi
- Meral Menderes
- Erol Pekcan
- Cengiz Tanç

== 1934 Born ==
- Metin Ersoy
- Nesrin Sipahi
- Ayşe Savaşır
- Diclehan Baban
- Sevim Tuna
- Nurinisa Toksöz
- Nurten İnnap
- Ayla Erduran
- Yaşar Özel

== 1935 Born ==
- Ali Ekber Çiçek
- Tülay German
- Adnan Şenses
- Ali Ekber Çiçek
- Efkan Efekan
- Ahmet Say
- Alpay
- Ayşegül Sarıca

== 1936 Born ==
- Göksel Arsoy
- Esin Afşar
- Erol Büyükburç
- Juanito
- Gönül Yazar
- Ali Avaz
- Teoman Önaldı
- Ahmet Sezgin
- Ceylan Ece
- Oktay Yurdatapan
- Ali Avaz
- Ceylan Ece
- Ahmet Sezgin
- Bekir Sıdkı Sezgin

== 1937 Born ==
- Ayla Algan
- Nuri Sesigüzel
- Turhan Özek
- Gündoğdu Duran

== 1938 Born ==
- Neşet Ertaş
- Tanju Okan
- Berkant
- Güngör Hoşses
- Yıldırım Gürses
- Yıldız Ayhan
- Yıldız İrengün
- Lale Belkıs
- Sezen Cumhur Önal
- Şevket Uğurluer
- Mahmut Erdal
- Ayla Gürses
- Turan Engin
- Ayla Büyükataman

== 1939 Born ==
- Aşık Mahzuni Şerif
- Çetin Işıközlü
- Kerem Güney
- Ertan Anapa
- Ülkü Beşgül
- Meral Uğurlu
- Çiğdem Talu

== 1940 Born ==
- Belkıs Özener
- Özdemir Erdoğan
- Fatoş Balkır
- Erkut Taçkın
- Meral Yapalı
- Hülya Saydam
- Durul Gence
- Gülay Uğurata

== 1941 Born ==
- İdil Biret
- Erkin Koray
- Ferdi Özbeğen
- Arif Şentürk
- Bedia Akartürk
- Şanar Yurdatapan
- Mihrican Bahar
- İlkan San
- Taner Şener
- Dursun Salkım

== 1942 Born ==
- Atakan Çelik
- Romalı Perihan
- Gönül Akkor
- Mutlu Torun
- Aykut Oray
- Sevda Ferdağ
- Ömür Göksel
- Zaliha
- Adnan Varveren

== 1943 Born ==
- Barış Manço
- Attila Özdemiroğlu

== 1944 Born ==
- Ayla Dikmen
- Orhan Gencebay
- Mehmet Teoman
- Selçuk Alagöz
- Zekai Tunca
- Leyla Pınar
- Faruk Türünz
- Ümit Tokcan
- Atakan Ünüvar

== 1945 Born ==
- Yılmaz Tatlıses
- Aydın Tansel
- Esin Engin
- Erol Erdinç
- Cem Karaca
- Emel Sayın
- Ferdi Tayfur
- Işıl Yücesoy
- Arif Sağ
- Hakkı Bulut
- Selçuk Ural
- Rahmi Saltuk
- İzzet Altınmeşe
- Atilla İçli
- Nüzhet Öyken
- Engin Yörükoğlu
- Esin Engin
- Yıldız Tezcan
- Galip Sokullu
- Mustafa Keser

== 1946 Born ==
- Fikret Kızılok
- Ajda Pekkan
- Zülfü Livaneli
- Timur Selçuk
- Murat Ses
- Atilla Engin
- Samime Sanay
- Seçil Heper
- Tülay Özer
- Fedon Kalyoncu
- Ünol Büyükgönenç
- Cahit Oben
- Aynur Aydan
- Bora Ayanoğlu
- Ülkü Aker
- Selim Atakan
- Nejat Toksoy

== 1947 Born ==
- Azize Gencebay
- Muazzez Abacı
- Erol Evgin
- Hümeyra
- Neşe Karaböcek
- Füsun Önal
- Soner Özbilen
- Şenay
- Çetin Alp
- Kamil Sönmez
- Kâmuran Akkor
- Şenay
- Aziz Azmet
- Uğur Dikmen
- Çetin Alp
- Asuman Bendaş
- Ali Kocatepe

== 1948 Born ==
- Muhlis Akarsu
- Selda Bağcan
- Onno Tunç
- Asu Maralman
- Neco
- Atilla Alpsakarya
- Nil Burak
- İlhan Şeşen (died 2025)
- Fuat Güner
- Selami Şahin
- Rana Alagöz
- Bircan Pullukcuoğlu
- Tahir Nejat Özyılmazel
- Turhan Taşan
- Göknur Onur

== 1949 Born ==
- Ozan Arif
- Ersan Erdura
- Esmeray
- Kayahan
- Vedat Sakman
- Kayahan
- Sezer Güvenirgil
- Erkan Ocaklı
- Kerim Çaplı
- Hayko
- Seyfi Doğanay
- Ersan Erdura

== 1950 Born ==
- Galip Boransu
- Ali Rıza Binboğa
- Bülent Ortaçgil
- Ahmet Özhan
- İbrahim Sesigüzel
- Atilla Şereftuğ
- Erdal Kızılçay
- Nejat Yavaşoğulları
- Mazhar Alanson
- Ülkü Ülker
- Yüksel Uzel
- Ali Osman Akkuş
- Ayhan Sicimoğlu
- Orhan Akdeniz
- Akın Uğurlu
- Edip Akbayram

== 1951 Born ==
- Nükhet Ruacan
- Leman Sam
- Hale Gür
- Ahmet Güvenç
- Ahmet Poyrazoğlu
- Gökben
- Selma Güneri
- Aylin Urgal
- Melih Kibar

== 1952 Born ==
- Bülent Ersoy
- Seyyal Taner
- İbrahim Tatlıses
- Serpil Örümcer
- Coşkun Sabah
- Mithat Özyılmazel
- Fuat Saka
- Yıldız İbrahimova
- Müşerref Akay
- Deniz Tek
- Emel Büyükburç
- Yıldız İbrahimova
- Yüksel Özkasap
- Kudsi Erguner
- Şehrazat
- Ercan Turgut
- Fikret Alper
- Durmuş Çiğdem
- Gönül Şen

== 1953 Born ==
- İskender Doğan
- Fatih Erkoç
- Müslüm Gürses
- Gülden Karaböcek
- Selçuk Tekay
- Atilla Atasoy
- Osman Yağmurdereli
- Gülistan Okan
- Işıl German
- Kazım Akşar
- Senem Diyici
- Edibe Sulari
- Tunç Ünver
- Tülin Tan
- Hilmi Şahballı

== 1954 Born ==
- Nazan Şoray
- Sezen Aksu
- Nükhet Duru
- Erkan Oğur
- Esengül
- Belkıs Akkale
- Gökhan Güney
- Muhteşem Demirağ
- Recep Aktuğ
- Kurtuluş Türkgüven
- Nilgün Atılgan
- Akrep Nalan
- Yaşar Yağmur
- Güngör Bayrak

== 1955 Born ==
- Asım Can Gündüz
- Mithat Körler
- Harun Kolçak
- İlhan İrem
- Nilüfer
- Ahmet Arıman
- Arif Susam
- Yunus Bülbül
- Ümit Acar
- Derya Köroğlu
- Hasan Yükselir
- Kamil Özler
- Burhan Bayar
- Levent Bektaş

== 1956 Born ==
- Ümit Besen
- Nazan Öncel
- Necla Nazır
- Melike Demirağ
- Sevda Karaca
- Meral Zeren
- Faruk Tınaz
- Dilber Ay
- Meral Mansuroğlu
- Yeşim
- Halis Bütünley
- Ayşe Tunalı
- Taci Uslu
- Ozan Yusuf Polatoğlu
- Sefai
- Meral Mansuroğlu
- Meral Taytuğlu
- Nur Yoldaş

== 1957 Born ==
- Zuhal Olcay
- Arto Tunç
- Zerrin Özer
- Ahmet Kanneci
- Sabahat Akkiraz
- Ayşegül Aldinç
- Serpil Barlas
- Kudret Kurtcebe
- Bilgen Bengü
- Yeliz
- Aydın Karlıbel
- Mustafa Topaloğlu
- Sinan Erkoç
- Bünyamin Aksungur
- Sevil Özyurt
- Cengiz Kurtoğlu

== 1958 Born ==
- Hasan Cihat Örter
- Bergen
- Sibel Egemen
- Muazzez Ersoy
- Semiha Yankı
- Hüsnü Arkan
- Hasan Cihat Örter
- Banu Alkan
- Acar Akalın
- Maria Rita Epik
- Ömer Danış
- Aydın Büke
- Mine Koşan
- Bülent Aris
- Hasan Hüseyin Demirel

== 1959 Born ==
- Halil Karaduman
- Zafer Peker
- Tuncay Akdoğan
- Özhan Eren
- Cem İdiz
- Burhan Öçal
- Gökalp Baykal
- Erdal Çelik
- Burhan Aydemir
- Sumru Ağıryürüyen
- Erdal Çelik
- Cengiz Kurtoğlu
- Sibil Pektorosoğlu
- Gökhan Birben

== 1960 Born ==
- Suzan Kardeş
- Kibariye
- Burhan Çaçan
- Hakan Karahan
- Ayşe Tütüncü
- Naşide Göktürk
- Semra İleten
- Harika Avcı
- Semra Türel
- Sabih Cangil
- Emre Saltık
- İlyas Tetik

== 1961 Born ==
- İbrahim Can
- Sayife Soyman
- Emel Müftüoğlu
- Mahmut Tuncer
- Candan Erçetin
- Fatih Kısaparmak
- Erol Budan
- Nalan Altınörs
- Erdal Tuğcular
- Gülşen Kutlu
- Jale
- İbrahim Can
- Gül Erda
- Hakan Peker
- Tüdanya
- Cavit Karabey
- Havva Karakaş
- Adnan Ergil
- Ayşe Mine
- Adnan Ergil
- Cengiz Onural

== 1962 Born ==
- Nuray Hafiftaş
- Seda Sayan
- İskender Türsen
- Ahmet Şafak
- Erkan Mutlu
- Ahmet Şafak
- Metin Özülkü
- Aydın Esen
- Faruk Salgar
- Bilal Ercan
- Sait Uçar
- Bora Ebeoğlu
- Metin Özülkü

== 1963 Born ==
- Candan Erçetin
- Hülya Avşar
- Meral Konrat
- Arzu Ece
- Yonca Evcimik
- Fahir Atakoğlu
- Tanju Duru
- Arzu Ece
- Aysun Gültekin
- Hüner Coşkuner
- Efkan Şeşen
- Ankaralı Turgut
- Nil Ünal
- Devran Çağlar
- Hasan Sağındık

== 1964 Born ==
- Yavuz Bingöl
- Sertab Erener
- Levent Yüksel
- Orhan Hakalmaz
- Murat Yılmazyıldırım
- Serhat
- Atilla Kaya
- Yılmaz Morgül
- İlkay Akkaya
- Ferhat Tunç
- Emel Taşçıoğlu
- Tayfun Hancılar
- Sinan Özen
- Tuğrul Arsever
- Serhat
- Erol Parlak

== 1965 Born ==
- Mansur Ark
- Seden Gürel
- Asya
- Şükriye Tutkun
- Tibet Ağırtan
- Murat Çelik
- Aslı Giray
- Müfide İnselel
- Birsen Tezer
- Erol Köse
- Cevdet Bağca
- Arslanbek Sultanbekov
- Alper Erinç
- Bülent Serttaş
- Hüseyin Bıçak
- Tülay Saygın
- Ayhan Alptekin
- Ali Seçkiner Alıcı

== 1966 Born ==
- Metin Şentürk
- Mirkelam
- Aylin Livaneli
- İbrahim Erkal
- Gülçin Yahya Kaçar
- Yıldız Tilbe
- Fatih Ürek
- Eda Özülkü
- Ahmet Akkaya
- Ahmet Çalışır
- Demet Sağıroğlu
- Çelik
- Erhan Güleryüz
- Cenk Taner
- Oya Küçümen
- Gürol Ağırbaş
- Nezih Ünen
- Aylin Livaneli
- Göksel Baktagir
- Yaşar Gaga
- Akın Ok
- Banu Kanıbelli
- Cenk Eren
- Selim Öztürk
- Eda Özülkü
- Oya Küçümen

== 1967 Born ==
- İskender Paydaş
- Güler Duman
- Teoman
- İbrahim Erkal
- Nilüfer Akbal
- Latif Doğan
- İbrahim Erkal
- Azer Bülbül
- Eda Karaytuğ
- Engin Gürkey
- Bülent Bezdüz
- Hakan Kurşun
- Cengiz Özkan

== 1968 Born ==
- Haluk Levent
- Feridun Düzağaç
- Murat Kekilli
- Kıvırcık Ali
- Rafet El Roman
- Yeşim Salkım
- Murat Göğebakan
- Oğuz Yılmaz
- Nev
- Ahmet Koç
- Ercan Saatçi
- Hakan Aysev
- Deniz Arcak
- Fulden Uras
- Ömer Danış
- Tarkan Tüzmen
- Ercan Saatçi
- Cihat Aşkın
- Şahsenem
- Akın
- Serhad Raşa
- Yaşar Kurt
- Bülent Evcil
- Nevzat Doğansoy
- Kenan Vural

== 1969 Born ==
- Emre Altuğ
- İzel
- Mahsun Kırmızıgül
- Can Atilla
- Özlem Yüksek
- Yeşim Vatan
- Deniz Özbey
- Altan Çetin
- Gökhan Semiz
- Aslı Omağ
- Cem Kısmet
- Sibel Köse
- Baha
- Altan Çetin
- Ege
- Tayfun
- Altan Çetin
- Hülya Polat
- Ete Kurttekin
- Azer Bülbül
- Cem Özkan
- Çağrı Göktepe
- Özlem Yüksek
- Nurten Ünsev
- Bora Dicle
- Burhan Berken

== 1970 Born ==
- Emre Altuğ
- Zeynep Casalini
- Sibel Can
- Yavuz Çetin
- Ferhat Göçer
- Yıldız Kaplan
- Reyhan Karaca
- Gökhan Kırdar
- Serdar Ortaç
- Mustafa Sandal
- Deniz Seki
- Aşkın Nur Yengi
- Gülay
- Meriç
- Fatih Erdemci
- Altay
- Ferda Anıl Yarkın
- Erdal Güney
- Yıldız Kaplan
- Yaşar
- Yeşim Salkım
- Cem İkiz
- Cem Yıldız
- Ertuğ Ergin
- Ümit Sayın
- Ender Doğan
- Kemal Dinç
- Ufuk Yıldırım
- Feryal Öney
- Can Uğurluer
- Aylin Vatankoş
- Rengin
- Burçin Bildik
- Cimilli İbo
- Cengiz Baysal

== 1971 Born ==
- Kazım Koyuncu
- Emrah
- Göksel
- Özlem Tekin
- Sibel Tüzün
- Can Güney
- Hasret Gültekin
- Ogün Sanlısoy
- Ahmet Aslan
- Erdal Erzincan
- İlknur Bozkurt
- İbrahim Yazıcı
- Sibel Bilgiç
- Doğanay
- Volkan Baydar
- Metin Türkcan
- Erol Erarslan
- Seher Dilovan
- Hakan Demir
- Tarkan Çakır
- Seren Serengil
- Hilal Özdemir
- Melda Gür

== 1972 Born ==
- Demet Akalın
- Demir Demirkan
- Özcan Deniz
- Gülben Ergen
- Şebnem Ferah
- Kıraç
- Şevval Sam
- Tarkan
- Tarık Mengüç
- Sevda Demirel
- Hakan Altun
- Ata Demirer
- Burak Aydos
- Ozan Doğulu
- Ayça Şen
- Davut Güloğlu
- Pınar Ayhan
- Pınar Aylin
- Pınar Dilşeker
- Ayça
- Nilgül
- Sevda Demirel
- Metin Arolat
- Mine Çağlıyan
- Emine Ata
- Ozan Orhon
- Metin Arolat
- Okan Ersan
- Tuğçe San
- Selen Gülün
- Recep Ergül

== 1973 Born ==
- Kaan Tangöze
- Tuna Kiremitçi
- Ayla Çelik
- Işın Karaca
- Burak Kut
- Pamela
- Timuçin Şahin
- Ahmet Sendil
- Hande Yener
- Gülseren
- Hazal Selçuk
- Bendeniz
- Servet Kocakaya
- Çılgın Sedat
- Özge Fışkın
- Kutsi
- Ayşe Önder
- Tolga Sağ
- Bora Öztoprak
- Nâlân
- Hakan Taşıyan
- Taner
- Faruk K
- Songül Karlı
- Güllü
- Hazal
- Sedat Kapurtu
- Cansu Koç
- Seray Sever
- Özcan Türe
- Nalan Tokyürek
- Hülya Kazan

== 1974 Born ==
- Hande Dalkılıç
- Tuba Önal
- Zeynep Bakşi Karatağ
- Kubat
- Oğuz Aksaç
- Toygar Işıklı
- Doğuş
- Kenan Doğulu
- Ebru Gündeş
- Rober Hatemo
- Ali Kınık
- Batuhan Mutlugil
- Deniz Yılmaz
- Bertuğ Cemil
- Hale Caneroğlu
- Murat Başaran
- Ebru Cündübeyoğlu
- Ceylan Avcı
- Halil Altınköprü
- Deniz Yılmaz
- Erol Temizel
- İntizar
- Serap Acar
- Alihan
- Özlem Taner
- Ferit Tunçer
- Atakan Ilgazdağ
- Alihan

== 1975 Born ==
- Funda Arar
- Koray Candemir
- Burcu Güneş
- Ziynet Sali
- Atilla Taş
- Fettah Can
- Zeynep
- Sibel Alaş
- Suat Suna
- Kerim Tekin
- Mine Çayıroğlu
- Aynur Doğan
- Sevda Karababa
- Serhat Kılıç
- Esra Dalfidan
- Behçet Gülas
- Ozan Kotra
- Tolga Sünter
- Esra Balamir
- Koray Candemir

== 1976 Born ==
- Can Gox
- Ragga Oktay
- Alişan
- Aylin Aslım
- Ceza
- Gülşen
- Nil Karaibrahimgil
- Zara
- Aytaç Doğan
- Hande Özyürek
- Zeynep Mansur
- Aylin Aslım
- Öztürk İlmaz
- Kader Ateş
- Asuman Krause
- Zeynep Dizdar
- Nadide Sultan
- Gökhan Özoğuz
- Ayta Sözeri
- Emrah Karaca
- Sedat Yüce
- Mehmet Borukcu
- Hakan Özoğuz
- Umut Kuzey
- Ankaralı Namık
- Aylin Coşkun
- Ayşenur Kolivar
- Serdem Coşkun
- Tuğba Altıntop
- Ozan Tügen
- Bahadır Tatlıöz

== 1977 Born ==
- Beyza Durmaz
- Keremcem
- Şebnem Paker
- Ebru Yaşar
- Can Aksel Akın
- Lerzan Mutlu
- Erdal Bayrakoğlu
- Günce Koral
- Edis İlhan
- Harun Tekin
- Aslı Gökyokuş
- Aslı Hünel
- Sevgi Berna Biber
- Göknur Onur
- Ebru Destan
- Melis Danişmend
- Donat Bayer
- Emir Ersoy
- Gülhan
- Seyfi Yerlikaya
- Tuğba Ekinci
- Serdar Barçın
- Ozan Musluoğlu
- Emine Ün
- Serap Sapaz

== 1978 Born ==
- Ersay Üner
- Aytekin Ataş
- Mümin Sarıkaya
- Mehmet Erdem
- Rojda Aykoç
- Hayko Cepkin
- Sagopa Kajmer
- Ayşe Hatun Önal
- Soner Sarıkabadayı
- İsmail YK
- Burcu Tatlıses
- Gökhan Tepe
- Güvenç Dağüstün
- Hatice
- Orhan Ölmez
- Serkan Kaya
- Sibel Gürsoy
- Arzu Şahin
- Yeliz Yeşilmen
- Meyra
- Ceynur
- Hümeyra Ilıcak
- Bora Duran
- Erdem Kınay
- Buket Bengisu
- Göknur Karadağ
- Mert Ekren
- Ebru Yaşar
- Ülkü Aşaröz
- Berdan Mardini
- Tarık Gamert

== 1979 Born ==
- Aslı Tandoğan
- Gökhan Özen
- Barış Akarsu
- Aydilge
- Bedük
- Bengü
- Gökçe
- Aslı Güngör
- Nez
- Güçlü Soydemir
- Kader
- Özgün
- Ferman Akgül
- Nez
- Pınar Aydınlar
- Berksan
- Cem Bahtiyar
- Lara
- Ayşe Özyılmazel
- Halil Sezai
- Mavi
- Özlem Özdil
- Sinan Kaynakçı
- Ankaralı Yasemin
- Onur Şentürk
- Sinan Kaynakçı

== 1980 Born ==
- Cem Adrian
- Murat Boz
- Mustafa Ceceli
- Petek Dinçöz
- Ceylan Ertem
- Sıla
- Yalın
- Harun Can
- Beşköylü Adem
- Tuğba Özerk
- Yusuf Demirkol
- Ebru Elver
- Ceylan Ertem
- Betül Demir
- Rojin
- Arda Doğan
- Emir
- Cihan Güçlü
- Jehan Barbur
- Levent Dörter
- Elif Çağlar
- Pınar Soykan
- Şirin Soysal
- Emre Özdemir
- Mert İçgören
- Adil Şan
- Başak Yavuz
- Şenay Lambaoğlu

== 1981 Born ==
- Onurr
- Emre Aydın
- Simge
- Doğukan Manço
- Emre Kaya
- Pınar Aydın
- Onur Şan
- Tan Taşçı
- Erdem Yener
- Mercan
- Umut Kaya
- Özgür Çevik
- Berkay
- Diyar Pala
- Emre Kaya
- Güler
- Mithat Can Özer
- Su Soley
- Gizem Berk
- Özgür Tüzer
- Zeki Çağlar Namlı

== 1982 Born ==
- Öykü Gürman
- Emina
- Ali Deniz Kardelen
- Ayben
- Yasemin Mori
- Sinan Akçıl
- Sibel Pamuk
- Kemal Küçükbakkal
- Sevcan Orhan
- Alev Lenz
- Hüseyin Kağıt
- Resul Dindar
- Onur Özsu
- Hakan Tunçbilek
- Berk Gürman
- Aydoğan Topal
- Onur Özsu

== 1983 Born ==
- Gökhan Türkmen
- Murat Dalkılıç
- Kolera
- Çağrı Müftüoğlu
- Eko Fresh
- Deniz Çetin
- Kıvılcım
- Ege Çubukçu
- Sibel Mirkelam
- Halil Koçak
- Yıldız Asyalı
- Ebru Polat
- Ece Anlı
- Ali Buhara Mete
- Gülden
- İrfan Özata
- Aydın Kurtoğlu
- Zerrin Karslı
- Benyamin Sönmez
- Günseli Deniz
- Ege Çubukçu

== 1984 Born ==
- Fatma Turgut
- Buray
- Görkem Karabudak
- Gülden Mutlu
- Yusuf Güney
- Cihan Mürtezaoğlu
- Engin Nurşani
- Niyazi Koyuncu
- Kerim Yağcı
- Meltem Yılmazkaya
- Hakan Erol
- Ercan Demirel
- Buğrahan Çayır
- Fatih Bulut

== 1985 Born ==
- Gülçin Ergül
- Gaye Su Akyol
- Oğuzhan Koç
- Aynur Aydın
- Hadise
- Mabel Matiz
- Ruhi Su
- Genco Ecer
- Aşkın Çolak
- Selim Gülgören
- Norm Ender
- Onur Tuna
- Sezgin Alkan
- Cemre Kemer
- Taha Gürbüz
- Lider Şahin
- Sinan Keskin
- Ayşegül Coşkun

== 1986 Born ==
- Taner Ölmez
- Kalben
- Apolas Lermi
- Derya Uluğ
- Emre Korkmaz
- Gökben Derviş
- Manuş Baba
- Seçil Gür
- Sinan Güleryüz

== 1987 Born ==
- Fikri Karayel
- Gökhan Keser
- Merve Daşdemir
- Byb Berlin
- Can Bonomo
- İrem Derici
- Tuğba Yurt
- Birkan Nasuhoğlu
- Emrah Karaduman
- Kendi
- Hasan Doğru
- Seniha

== 1988 Born ==
- Atiye
- Güliz Ayla
- Gazapizm
- Nazlı
- Merve Özbey
- Funda Kılıç
- Aslı Özer
- Funda Kılıç
- Yamaç Telli
- Eda And
- Melek Mosso

== 1989 Born ==
- İlyas Yalçıntaş
- Can Kazaz
- Eda Baba
- Gökçe Kırgız
- Selçuk Balcı
- Dilan Çıtak
- Melike Şahin

== 1990 Born ==
- Karsu
- Uğur Akyürek
- Atakan Çelik
- Furkan Kızılay
- Anıl Piyancı
- Can Ozan
- Edis
- Merve Kocabeyler

== 1991 Born ==
- Nova Norda
- Ezhel
- Ece Seçkin

== 1992 Born ==
- Kaan Boşnak
- Ufuk Beydemir

== 1993 Born ==
- Zeynep Bastık
- Emir Can İğrek
- Lara Melda
- Mert Demir

== 1994 Born ==
- Sura İskenderli

== 1995 Born ==
- Hande Mehan
- Nilüfer Yanya

== 1996 Born ==
- Feride Hilal Akın
- Berkcan Güven

== 1997 Born ==
- Can Çakmur
- Cem Esen

== 1998 Born ==
- Sefo
- Sena Şener

== 1999 Born ==
- Güneş

== 2000 Born ==
- Aleyna Tilki

== Groups ==
- Adamlar
- Ahmet Beyler
- Apaşlar
- Athena
- Ayna
- Baba Zula
- Badem
- Bağzıları
- Beş Yıl Önce, On Yıl Sonra
- Beyaz Kelebekler
- Bulutsuzluk Özlemi
- Büyük Ev Ablukada
- Cartel
- Cevher-i Musiki
- Cici Kızlar
- Çıtar Kızlar
- Duman (band)
- Dolapdere Big Gang
- Dolu Kadehi Ters Tut
- Enbe Orkestrası
- Ersen ve Dadaşlar
- Flört
- Gece Yolcuları
- Grup Gündoğarken
- Grup Pan
- Grup Vitamin
- Grup Yorum
- Hepsi
- 3 Hür-El
- İkiye On Kala
- Kargo
- Klips ve Onlar
- Kolpa
- Koma Rozerin
- Köfn
- Kurban
- Kurtalan Ekspres
- Lale ve Nerkis Hanımlar
- Madrigal
- Malt
- maNga
- Manifest
- Mavi Işıklar
- Mavi Sakal
- MFÖ
- Model (band)
- Modern Folk Üçlüsü
- Moğollar
- Mor ve Ötesi
- Neyse
- Nükleer Başlıklı Kız
- Pentagram (Mezarkabul)
- Oya-Bora
- Pera
- Pinhani
- Pilli Bebek
- Redd
- Riyaset-i Cumhur Musiki Heyeti
- Sakin
- Seksendört
- Silüetler
- Son Feci Bisiklet
- TPAO Batman
- Twenty7
- Vega
- Yeni Türkü
- Yurtseven Kardeşler
- Yüksek Sadakat
- 4 Yüz
- Yüzyüzeyken Konuşuruz
- Zakkum

== See also ==
- Music of Turkey
