= Pınar =

- Gender: Female

Origin
- Language: Turkish
- Meaning: "Spring (of water)", "Fountain"

Pınar is a common feminine Turkish given name. In Turkish, "Pınar" means "Spring" (of water), and/or "Fountain".

== Given name ==
- Pınar Altuğ (born 1974), Turkish actress
- Pinar Atalay (born 1978), German radio and TV presenter
- Pınar Aydınlar (born 1979), Turkish politician and singer
- Pınar Ayhan (born 1972), Turkish singer
- Pınar Deniz (born 1993), Turkish actress
- Pınar Dönmez (born 2007), Turkish swimmer
- Pinar Heggernes (born 1969), Turkish-born Norwegian computer scientist
- Pınar İlkkaracan, Turkish human rights activist
- Pınar Keskinocak, Turkish-American systems engineer
- Pınar Köksal (1946–2019), Turkish composer
- Pınar Kür (1943–2025), Turkish novelist, dramatist, and translator
- Şükran Pınar Ovalı (born 1985), Turkish actress
- Pinar Oya Yilmaz, Turkish-American geologist
- Pınar Saka (born 1985), Turkish track running athlete
- Pınar Selek (born 1971), Turkish sociologist
- Pınar Soykan (born 1980), Turkish pop singer, actress & model
- Pınar Tartan (born 1997), Turkish model and beauty pageant winner
- Pınar Toprak (born 1980), Turkish composer
- Pınar Yalçın (born 1988), Turkish-Swedish footballer
- Pinar Yolaçan (born 1981), Turkish artist
- Pınar Yoldaş, Turkish-American architect, artist and professor
- Pinar Zorlutuna, Turkish-American biomedical engineer

== Surname ==
- Berat Onur Pınar (born 2002), Turkish footballer
- Leyla Pınar, Turkish harpsichordist and musicologist
- Sedat Pınar (born 1970), Bosnian former basketball player

== See also ==
- Pınar, Dicle
- Pınar, Tunceli
- Pınar Karşıyaka, Turkish professional basketball team located in Karşıyaka, İzmir
- Eflatun Pınar, a spring which rises up from the ground, creating an oasis and fountain
- Murder of Pınar Gültekin, 2020 femicide in Turkey
- Pınar (company), a Turkish daily food company
