= NBK =

NBK may refer to any one of the following:

- Nabeya Bi-tech Kaisha, a Japanese company
- Nandamuri Balakrishna, an Indian actor and politician
- National Bank of Kenya
- National Bank of Kuwait
- Natural Born Killers, a 1994 motion picture
  - Natural Born Killers also "inspired" many copycat crimes often attributed to the film
- Neuer Berliner Kunstverein, the New Berlin Art Association
- Nordhordland B.K., a Norwegian football club
- Suvarnabhumi Airport, Bangkok, Thailand, temporary IATA code c.2006
- Nastyboy Klick, the former name of hip hop group NB Ridaz
- Nükleer Başlıklı Kız, a Turkish band from Ankara
- Nungambakkam railway station, Chennai, Tamil Nadu, India (by Indian Railways station code)
- A type of identifier used by NCBI Bookshelf
