= Zorlutuna =

Zorlutuna is a Turkish surname. Notable people with the surname include:

- Halide Nusret Zorlutuna (1901–1984), Turkish poet and novelist
- Pinar Zorlutuna (fl. 2009), Turkish and American biomedical engineer
