= Dinç =

Dinç is a Turkish surname. Notable people with the surname include:

- Ayşe Dinç (born 1999), Turkish female handball player
- Hakan Dinç (born 1963), Turkish race car driver
- Kemal Dinç (born 1970), Turkish folk artist and music teacher

== See also ==
- Dinç Bilgin (born 1940), Turkish businessman
- DINC, acronym that stands for "double income, no kids"
