= Morgul (disambiguation) =

Morgul is a Norwegian symphonic black metal band.

Morgul, Morgûl, or Morgül may also refer to:

- Morgûl, a noun translating as "sorcery" in J. R. R. Tolkien's fictional language of Sindarin
  - Minas Morgul ("Tower of Sorcery"), a fictional fortified city in Tolkien's Middle Earth
    - A Morgul-blade, a magical dagger associated with the city
  - Minas Morgul (album), an atmospheric black metal album by Summoning based on Tolkien's legendarium
- Morgul (rural locality), a rural locality (a selo) near Sretensk in the Sretensky District of Zabaykalsky Krai, Russia
- Morgul-Bismark, a cycling route in Colorado
- İbrahim Yılmaz Morgül, a Turkish singer
