= Soner =

Soner may refer to:

- Soner Arıca (born 1966), Turkish singer and record producer
- Soner Aydoğdu (born 1991), Turkish footballer
- Soner Cagaptay (born 1970), Turkish-American political scientist
- Soner Demirtaş (born 1991), Turkish freestyle sport wrestler
- Soner Özbilen (born 1947), Turkish folk singer, conductor, and compiler
- Soner Uysal (born 1977), Turkish football coach
