= Özbilen =

Özbilen is a surname. Notable people with the surname include:

- İlham Tanui Özbilen (born 1990), Kenyan-Turkish middle-distance runner
- Kaan Kigen Özbilen (born 1986), Kenyan-Turkish long-distance runner
- Soner Özbilen (born 1947), Turkish folk singer
