= BYB =

BYB or byb may stand for:

- Back Yard Burgers
- IATA code Dibba Airport
- Byb Berlin Turkish composer
