= Çubukçu =

Çubukçu is a Turkish surname. Notable people with the surname include:

- Bilal Çubukçu (born 1987), Turkish footballer
- Bayhan Çubukçu (1934–2021), Turkish academician
- Ege Çubukçu
- Nimet Çubukçu (born 1965), Turkish politician and lawyer
- Ömer Çubukçu
