= Selçuk Tekay =

Turkish composer and musician (1953–2021)

- Born: 1953; Kağızman, Kars, Turkey
- Died: 14 June 2021 (aged 67–68); Istanbul, Turkey
- Occupations: Musician, composer

Selçuk Tekay (1953 – 14 June 2021) was a Turkish composer and performing musician.

== Biography ==
Tekay was born in 1953 in Kağızman, Kars. After his education at Vefa High School and music school he received training from Turkish classical music artists such as Emin Ongan, Feridun Darbaz, and Teoman Önaldı. As an album director, orchestra conductor and violinist, he worked on stage and album works for Turkish Classical Music artist, including Müzeyyen Senar, Zeki Müren, Emel Sayın, Bülent Ersoy, Muazzez Ersoy, Ebru Gündeş and Muazzez Abacı. He composed songs such as Beraber Yürüdük Biz Bu Yollarda, Vurgun, Unuturum Diye Yorma Kendini, Yorgunum, ve Aradığın Aşkı Buldun mu? He won the Golden Butterfly Composer of the Year Award with Vurgun in 1991, Beraber Yürüdük Biz Bu Yollarda in 1992, and Yorgunum Dostlarım in 1993.

He married Elif Maner in 1991. In 2011, Elif Maner filed for divorce due to severe incompatibility.

Tekay died at the age of 68 after a heart attack in Istanbul on 14 June 2021. He was buried in Silivrikapı Cemetery.

== See also ==
- List of Turkish musicians
