= Ersan Erdura =

Turkish singer and actor

- Born: 15 May 1949 (age 77); Gaziantep, Turkey
- Origin: Turkish
- Occupations: Singer, actor
- Instrument: Vocals
- Years active: 1961–present
- Formerly of: Boğaziçi Orkestrası
- Website: ErsanErdura.com

Ersan Erdura (born 15 May 1949) is a Turkish singer and actor. He is often referred to as "Turkish Elvis".

Ersan Erdura was born in Gaziantep, Turkey. When he was 6 months old, his father died and his family relocated to İstanbul. His musical interest began with a guitar bought from market place by his grandmother.

He formed a band named "Boğaziçi Orkestrası" with his close friends when he was 12 years old. In 1965, Ersan Erdura and the band won Best Orchestra and Best Vocal titles at the Caddebostan Son Saat Music Awards. In 1967, Ersan Erdura joined the Golden Voice Contest organized by Haftasonu and he was selected as the "King of Golden Voice".

He is married to Leyla Erdura since 1968 and has three daughter, Dilara, Ayça and Gözde.

== Discography ==
=== Soundtracks ===
- 1970 - Köyün Beş Güzeli (movie)
- 2010 - Çocuklar Duymasın (TV series)

=== 45s ===
- 1968 - Sen Benimsin - Siempre Manuel
- 1972 - İshak Kuşu - Dediler
- 1972 - Çiğdem/Yaralım
- 1977 - Çocuk Gözler/Yalnız Değilsin
- 1978 - Acılar Sürekli Olamaz/Geçen Yaz
- 1979 - Kara Gölgen Olaydım/Hayalim Gitmez
- 1980 - Aşıksın/Beni Ara

=== Albums ===
- 1981 - Ve Ben Yalnız 1 (LP)
- 1982 - Bakışlım (LP)
- 2001 - 40 Yılın Liste Başı Şarkıları (cassette)
- 1979 - Hayalin Gitmez (CD)
- 2010 - En İyileriyle Ersan Erdura (CD)
- 2012 - Bir Zamanlar Seksenler (CD)
