= Hasan Cihat Örter =

Turkish composer (born 1958)

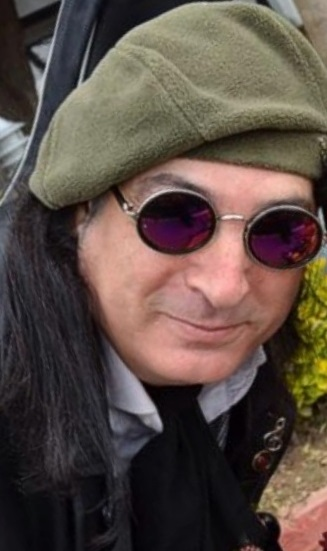

Background information
- Born: October 24, 1958 (age 67); Istanbul, Turkey
- Genres: Turkish folk, Jazz, New-age
- Occupations: Composer, guitarist, arranger, singer, bağtarist
- Instruments: guitar, piano, violin, bağlama, fretless guitar, utar, oud, cümbüş, Turkish tambur, yaylı tambur, yaylı cümbüş
- Years active: 1970–present
- Labels: EMI, Sony, DMC, Genç Müzik, Üç Adım Müzik, Anadolu Müzik, Ads Müzik, Balet Plak, Artvizyon Yapım, Mem Music

Hasan Cihat Örter (born October 24, 1958) is a Turkish composer, progressive guitarist and arranger.

== Life and career ==
Örter was very young when he first started playing the piano and violin. He then attended Emin Ongan's Turkish music lessons at Uskudar Musical Association, (Üsküdar Musiki Cemiyeti) in 1974. Örter has been described as an extremely versatile guitarist. He plays traditional Turkish music, but also plays jazz, classical, rock and metal. He can play a range of traditional Turkish instruments, as well as piano and violin. Using a fretless guitar he is able to produce sounds that are not possible on normal guitars. The glissandi sounds he is able to produce on a fretless guitar allow him to create sounds that are characteristic of traditional Turkish music. In additional to traditional music, he is able to play traditional instruments such as the cura in a non-traditional style that blends Turkish traditional music and rock-style guitar techniques and showmanship. Billboard described his album (Re)formation as "a collection of Turkish classical compositions designed to internationalize the sound and appeal of such music" The arrangements are described as "thoroughly modern arrangements of Ottoman court muric from the 18th and 19th centuries". The instruments featured on the album include traditional instruments like the ney, as well as fretless and acoustic guitars, violin, and piano. The arrangements have "an authentic feel, despite their modern presentation". He is credited with arrangement for the album Inspiration Turkey Anatolian Folk Music released through EMI.

== Discography ==
- 1983 – Anatolian Folk Music Classical Guitar – (Kent Müzik (Istanbul)
- 1994 – Anatolian Folk Music Classical Guitar – E.M.I. – (Kent Müzik) – (Gold Record Award))
- 1995 – Women symphonies – Kadın'ın Senfonileri – New-Age – E.M.I. – (Kent Müzik)
- 1996 – Re-formation 1 (Turk Enstrumantal Music, New-Age) – (Sony Music – Colombia (International catalog))
- 1997 – Re-formation 2 (Turk Enstrumantal Music, New-Age) – (Sony Music)
- 1998 – Insprition (Re-Formation Remix – London ) – Sony Music – (Raks)
- 1998 – İstanbul Şarkıları, Modern Folk Üçlüsü, Emel Sayın – (Raks)
- 1998 – Buddha Bar 3 Catalog (Re-Formation – Dj.Rawin ) – (Buddha Bar III)
- 1998 – Mektup, (Film music sound track ) – (Raks)
- 1999 – Aşk ve Hüzün – Vocal Music Compositions – (Ezgi Medya)
- 2003 – Gitarın Sessiz Çığlığı (for Yavuz Cetin) – Rock Guitar Compositions – (Genç Music)
- 2004 – İstanbul'da Modern Oyun Havaları – Enstrumantal – (Seyhan Müzik)
- 2005 – Senden Yanayım – Vocal Music Compositions – (Artvizyon Müzik)
- 2005 – Music Therapy – Enstrumental Compositions – with book – (Genç Mephisto)
- 2006 – Dünyanın Gözyaşları – Vocal Music Compositions – (E.M.I)
- 2006 – İki Derviş'in Aşk Yarası – Vocal Music Compositions – (Seyhan Müzik)
- 2005 – The Symphony of Kabe and Hicret – (Genç Müzik)
- 2006 – Songs – fretless Guitar & E-bow – (DMC)
- 2006 – Hasan Cihat Örter Albums in Mixed Classics : I, II, III, IV – (H.C.O.Prd.)
- 2007 – Mustafa Kemal Atatürk ve Vatan Senfonisi – (Atlantis Müzik)
- 2007 – World Classical Guitar Pieces – (Genç Müzik)
- 2008 – "Haz" Classical Guitar – Saz Eserleri – Compositions – (Genç Müzik)
- 2008 – "Giz" Accustic Fretless Guitar – (Seyhan Müzik)
- 2008 – Sadabad – Osmanlı Sarayı – (Tanbur Compositions)Tanbur ile Besteler – (Anadolu Müzik)
- 2009 – Seven Days in Istanbul – Accustic guitar – (Mem Productions "Mr. Murat Malay)
- 2010 – fretless Love – fretless Songs – (Mimoza Medya "Mr.Bedri Büklülmez)
- 2010 – Fretless Guitar Methot, DVD – (Mimoza Medya "Mr.Bedri Büklülmez)
- 2012 – Renkler /Colors – (Mem Productions "Mr. Murat Malay)
- 2012 – Yakaris / 99 Esma'dan – (Mem Productions "Mr. Murat Malay)
- 2013: Garden Of Eden "Anomone" – New-Age – (Mem Müzik)
- 2013: The Galaxies – Single Guitar Avangarde – (Mem Müzik)
- 2013: Firkat – Fender Strat'68 – (Mem Müzik)
- 2013: Anotolian jazz variations – Single Jazz Guitar – (Mem Müzik)
- 2013: Yaylı Cümbüş – İcatlar – (Mem Müzik)
- 2013: Utar – İcatlar – (Mem Müzik)
- 2013: Ramiz Ramiz – Türküler – (Mem Müzik)
- 2013: Marşlar – (Mem Müzik)
- 2013: Aşk Şarkıları – Sözlü – Pop – (Mem Müzik)
- 2013: Symphony of Love & Piece – New-Age – (Mem Müzik)
- 2013: Music Therapy – Avangarde – (Mem Müzik)
- 2013: Müzikli Şiirler – Recep Garip & Hasan Cihat Örter – (Mem Müzik)
- 2014: Aşk Büyüsü – Pop Rock, Sözlü – (Mem Müzik)
- 2014: ATonal Feelings – Fussion – (Mem Müzik)
- 2014: Rebetiko – Hasan Cihat Örter & Buzuki Erol – (Mem Müzik)
- 2014: Diary – Günlük – (Mem Müzik)
- 2014: E-Bow Anatolia – Perdesiz Gitar ile... – (Mem Müzik)
- 2014: Hayyam – Ömer Hayyamdan Seçmeler – (Mem Müzik)
- 2014: Portreler – Sevdiklerine Müzikler – (Mem Müzik)
- 2015: La Carricature – (Mem Müzik)
- 2015: The Guitar From Anatolia – (Mem Müzik)
- 2015: Üsküdar – (Mem Müzik)
- 2015: Selçuklu İzleri "TRT Belgesel Müziği" – (Mem Müzik)
- 2015: Şarkılarım Senin İçin – (Mem Müzik)
- 2015: İcatlar, Bağtar ile Besteler – (Mem Müzik)
- 2015: Denemeler – (Mem Müzik)
- 2015: Hagia Sophia (Ayasofya) – (Mem Müzik)
- 2015: Halvette Hemhal – (Mem Müzik)
- 2015: Kabe Senfonisi 2 – (Mem Müzik)
- 2015: Krizantem Çiçekleri – (Mem Müzik)
- 2015: Mythology – (Mem Müzik)
- 2015: Re Formation Reloaded – (Mem Müzik)
- 2015: Şems Tebrizi – (Mem Müzik)
- 2015: Shahmaran – (Mem Müzik)
- 2015: Shakesphare Dreams – (Mem Müzik)
- 2015: The Best Of – "Altın Plak" ödülü (Mem Müzik)
- 2016: Aşka Boyanan Şarkılar & Akın Ok ile.
- 2016: Innovation V.1 & High Spirits
- 2016: Innovation V.2 & Elif – El Dorad
- 2016: Innovation V.3 & Piri Reis
- 2016: Innovation V.4 & Evliya Çelebi
- 2016: Innovation V.5 & Mimar Sinan
- 2016 : Innovation V.6 & Taptuk Emre – Yunus

== Books ==
- Hayatım, Gitarım ve Müziğim – (Pan Yayıncılık)
- Anadolu Ezgileri Klasik Gitar ve Piyano İçin Düzenlemeler – (Pan Yayıncılık)
- HASAN CIHAT ÖRTER "USTAD SANATÇI, VCD" – (Bemol Müzik Yayıncılık)
- Hasan Cihat Örter´le Herkes humanity of society, 2 VCD – (Belgesel Ajans)
- Buzuki Erol (Örter) Rebetiko – (Pan Yayıncılık)
- İki Satirlik Şiirler – (Birun Kültür Sanat Yayıncılık)
- Saz Eserleri – (Bemol Müzik Yayınları)
- Anadolu'dan Klasik Gitar Çeşitlemeleri – (Bemol Müzik Yayınları)
- Müzik İle Terapi, Music CD – (Genç Mephisto Kitabevi)
