= Ağrı Dağı Efsanesi =

1971 opera by Çetin Işıközlü

- by Çetin Işıközlü
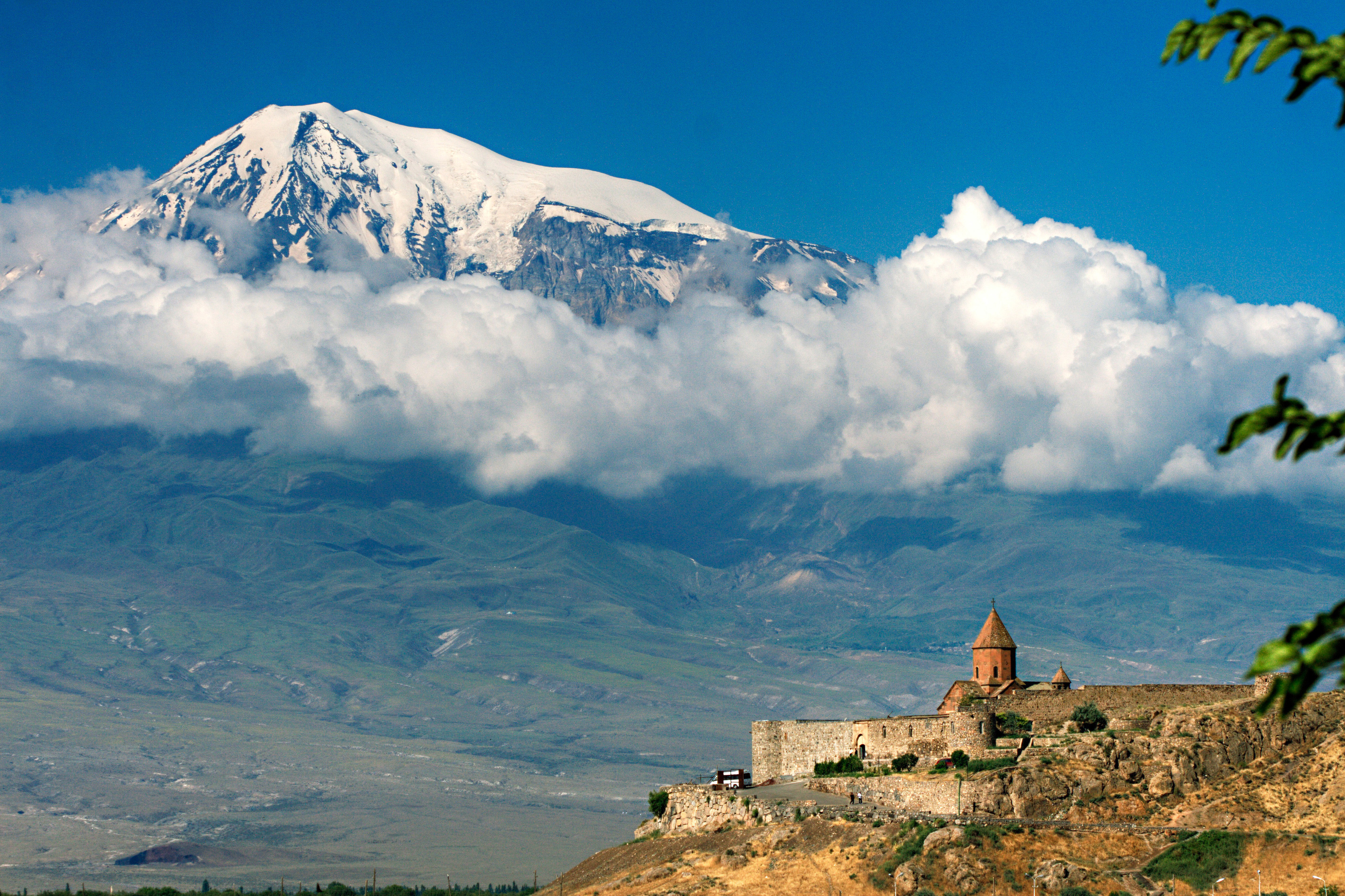
- Mount Ararat
- Translation: The Legend of Mt Ararat
- Language: Turkish
- Based on: Ağrıdağı Efsanesi by Yaşar Kemal

Ağrı Dağı Efsanesi ("The Legend of Mt Ararat") is a 1971 Turkish-language opera by Çetin Işıközlü. Mount Ararat is Mount Ağrı, Ağrı Dağı, in Turkish (wikt:ağrı can also mean "pain", "affliction"). The plot is based on the 1970 epic novel of the same name, Ağrıdağı Efsanesi, by Yaşar Kemal.

== Recordings ==
- Ağrı Dağı Efsanesi Ankara State Opera & Ballet Orchestra, Erol Erdinc
