= Esengül =

- Born: Esen Ağan; 24 September 1954; Istanbul, Turkey
- Died: 18 April 1979 (aged 24) Ataköy, Bakırköy, Istanbul
- Genres: Arabesque
- Occupation: Singer
- Years active: 1971–1979
- Labels: Şahinler (1971); Gurundik (1972); Taç (1972–1979); İstanbul (1975); Uzelli (1975–1979); Türküola (1976)

Esen Ağan (24 September 1954 – 18 April 1979), better known by her stage name Esengül, was a Turkish singer. Her published works in the 1970s broke sales records in Turkey.

== Life ==
=== Early years ===
Esengül, one of the two sisters in her family, was born in Istanbul and took her first music lessons from her mother, Piraye Ağan, who was a graduate of the conservatory. Later she worked with Cavit Deringöl, İrfan Özbakır and finally Abdullah Nail Bayşu, who gave her the nickname "Esengül". At the age of 15, she won a voice contest produced by Ayhan Coşkun. After the success of her first 45 rpm record, Aşkımı Süpürmüşler, she started working in casinos. Her albums were generally produced by Lütfü Sütşurup and released under the label Taç Plâk. She performed as a headliner in famous casinos in Istanbul, Ankara and İzmir.

=== Personal life ===
She married Orhan Akçınar in the first years of her career. However, she could not find the balance between the world of casinos and her marital life, and divorced her husband one month after their marriage due to irreconcilable differences. After a while, she married Adnan Şenses. Later she left Şenses and started a relationship with Beşiktaş football player Tayfun Kalkavan. She began to draw the attention of the media and the public with her love life and events such as a shooting in the casino where she was working at.

Apart from her professional life, she was being watched by the police because of the relationships she established with the bullies of the business world. After a while, she became unable to handle this early fame, and her name became associated with a number of shootings. In the incident brought out by İsmail Hacısüleymanoğlu (nicknamed "Oflu İsmail") at the Semiramis Casino named after Semiramis Pekkan, where Esengül was working on 31 March 1979, the owner of the casino Akbulut Karaoğlu and the waiter Hasan Yolal were shot in front of the audience. After the incident, it was said that Esengül was demonstrating inconsistent behavioral patterns.

== Death ==
Together with businessman Faruk Özfıratlı, she died in a traffic accident in Ataköy, Bakırköy, on 19 April 1979. After rumors that the accident was caused by mafia members became widespread, the incident was investigated by the police, but in official records the accident was judged to be caused from excessive alcohol use and high speed.

Esengül, who died at the age of 24, released twenty three 45 rpm records and four cassettes during her music career, and also acted in Oksal Pekmezoğlu's movie Yansın Bu Dünya. After her death, her 45 rpm records were gathered as LPs and sold in the music markets. Most of Esengül's songs, which were written and composed by Abdullah Bayşu, Orhan Akdeniz and Ülkü Aker, are among the classics of arabesque music.

== Discography ==
=== 45 rpm ===
| Year | Album | Sales and certifications |
|---|---|---|
| 1971 | Anlamıyorsun Gönül Derdinden-Sana Aşkımı Anlatabilsem: Date: 1971; Format: 45 rpm | |
| 1971 | Ayrılık Günü-Yüzüme Bakmaya Yüzün Yok: Date: 1971; Format: 45 rpm | |
| 1972 | Senden Işık Bekledim-Sevip Koklayacağım: Date: 1972; Format: 45 rpm | |
| 1972 | Bu Bizim Son Buluşmamız-Manalı Gözlerine: Date: 1972; Format: 45 rpm | |
| 1977 | Sensiz Hayat Çekilmiyor-Aşksız Yaşamaktansa: Date: 30 September 1977; Format: 45 rpm | |
| 1973 | Çok Geç Olmadan-Taht Kurmuşsun Kalbime: Date: 1973; Format: 45 rpm | |
| 1973 | Kalbim Seninle Dolu-Ayrılık Kolay mı Seven İnsana: Date: 1973; Format: 45 rpm | |
| 1973 | Sevdiğimin Kurbanıyım-Sensiz Kahrolmuştum: Date: 1973; Format: 45 rpm | |
| 1973 | Mutlu Olmanın Çaresi-Sen Mutlu Ettin Beni: Date: 1973; Format: 45 rpm | |
| 1973 | Gizli Yaram-Seninle Öleceğim: Date: 1973; Format: 45 rpm | |
| 1975 | Kırılsın Ayaklarım-Deli Gibi Sevdim: Date: 1975; Format: 45 rpm | |
| 1976 | Bu Bizim Son Buluşmamız-Manalı Gözlerine: Date: 1976; Format: 45 rpm | |
| 1976 | Beterin Beteri Var-Gel Arkadaş Olalım: Date: 1976; Format: 45 rpm | |
| 1976 | Seni Sevmekle Suçluyum-Gün Değil Ay Değil: Date: 1976; Format: 45 rpm | |
| 1976 | Gün Değil Ay Değil-Gel Arkadaş Olalım: Date: 1976; Format: 45 rpm | |
| 1977 | Hatırım İçin-Çok Üzgünsün Arkadaş: Date: 1977; Format: 45 rpm | |

=== Cassette ===
| Year | Album | Sales and certifications | Label |
|---|---|---|---|
| 1975 | Bir Yoksula Rastladım: Date: 1975; Format: MC, LP | | Uzelli Müzik |
| 1975 | Uçup Giden Gençliğime: Date: 1975; Format: MC, LP | | Uzelli Müzik |
| ? | Beterin Beteri Var: Date: Format: MC, LP | | |
| ? | Gel Otur Arkadaşım: Date: Format: MC, LP | | |

=== Posthumous releases ===
==== Cassette ====
| Year | Album | Sales and certifications |
|---|---|---|
| 1980, 1985 | Sevdiğimin Kurbanıyım: Date: 1980/1985; Format: MC, LP | |
| 1981 | Son Hatıram: Date: 1981; Format: MC, LP | |

==== CD ====
| Year | Album | Sales and certifications |
|---|---|---|
| 2005 | Beterin Beteri Var: Date: 16 July 2005; Format: MC, LP, CD | |
| 2005 | Bir Yoksula Rastladım: Date: 1 September 2005; Format: MC, LP, CD | |
| 2005 | Gel Otur Arkadaşım: Date: 1 September 2005; Format: MC, LP, CD | |
| 2005 | Uçup Giden Gençliğime: Date: 1 September 2005; Format: MC, LP, CD | |
