= Arif Şentürk =

Turkish folk singer and compiler (1941–2022)

- Born: 29 October 1941; Kumanovo, Kingdom of Bulgaria
- Origin: Kosovo Albanian, Bosniak
- Died: 15 February 2022 (aged 80) Fatih, Istanbul, Turkey
- Genres: Turkish folk music; Balkan folk music; Turkish folk literature
- Occupations: folk music and Balkan music artist; composer; musician; songwriter; lyricist
- Instruments: bağlama; zurna; davul; accordion; tulum
- Years active: 1975–2022

Arif Şentürk (Albanian: Arif Shenturk; 29 October 1941 – 15 February 2022) was a Turkish folk music and Balkan folk music artist, musician and composer.

== Life and career ==
Şentürk's father was of Albanian Kosovar origin while his mother of Bosniak origin. He was born in Kumanovo, Macedonia. He immigrated with his family to Turkey in 1956 after graduating Turkish primary school in PR Macedonia, FPR Yugoslavia. First, his family settled in Kırklareli Province after that they moved to Kazlıçeşme street of Zeytinburnu. Once he worked as a barber in Topkapı. He attended Edirnekapı and Florya Music Community Home. Arif Şentürk took the examination of the TRT Türkü and won it. He was endorsed by Nida Tüfekçi. Arif, who was known for compiling a lot of traditional Rumelian Turkish, Macedonian, Albanian and Gypsy folk songs, produced twelve albums. The most famous songs of his are "Deryalar", "Ramize", "Safiye", "Debreli Hasan", "Ani Mor Hatixhe", "Oj Kosovo", and "Bitola Moj Roden Kraj" composed by Ajri Demirovski.

He died on 15 February 2022, and was buried at Yedikule Cemetery.

== Discography ==
- Meliha, 23 December 2008
- Kına Havası, 24 December 1998
- Nazikem, 4 June 1990
- Deryalar, 9 January 1987
- Hamdi, 9 January 1987
- Yemen, 9 January 1987
