= Pınar Köksal =

Turkish composer (1946–2019)

Ayşe Pınar Köksal
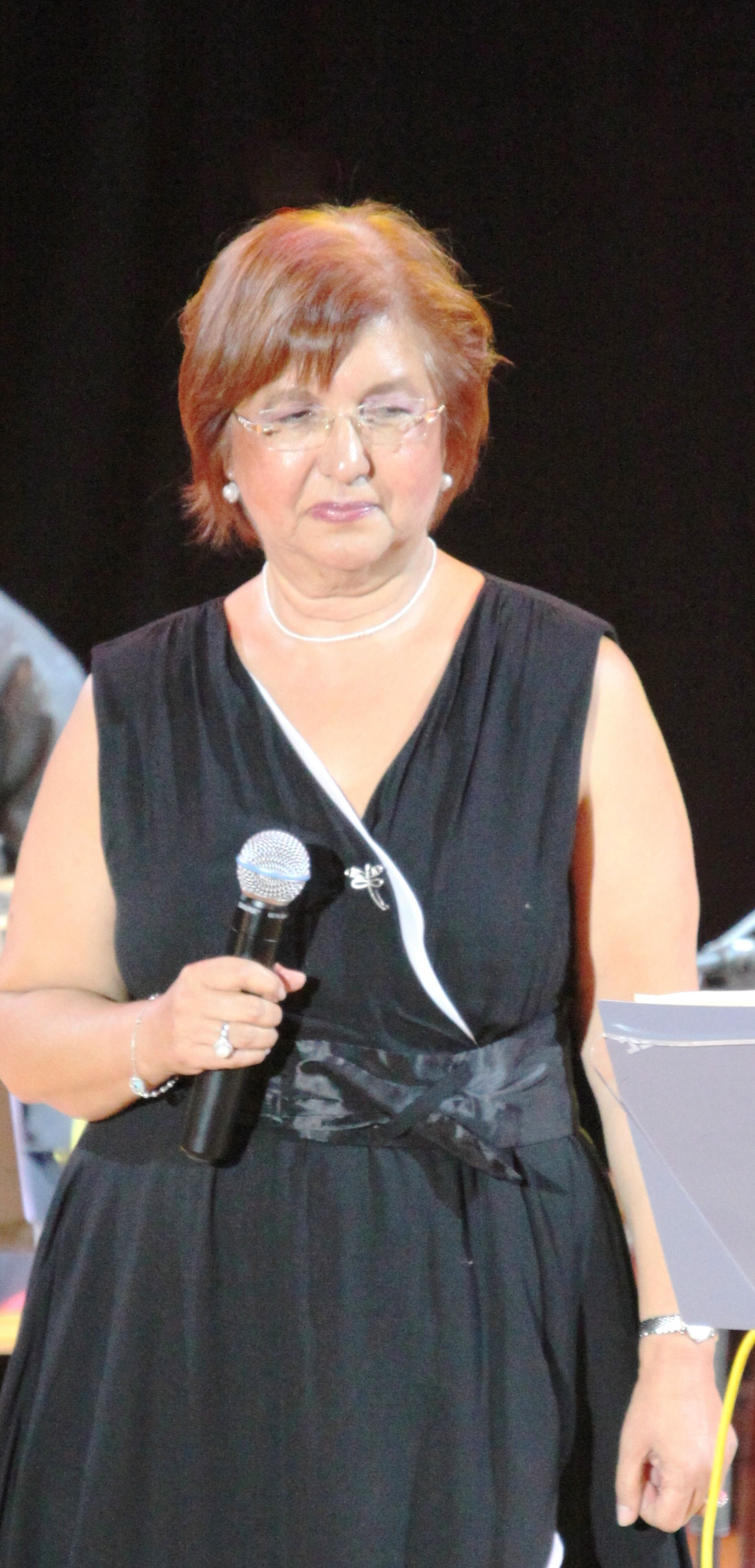
- Born: 20 April 1946; Adana, Turkey
- Died: 19 August 2019 (aged 73); Ankara, Turkey
- Occupation: Composer of Turkish classical music

Ayşe Pınar Köksal (20 April 1946 – 19 August 2019) was a Turkish composer of Turkish classical music. She lived in Ankara at the time of her death.

== Life ==
Köksal was born in Adana, and because her father was a civil servant her childhood was spent in different parts of Anatolia. She graduated from Kayseri High School and later studied pharmacy, receiving her diploma from the Private Higher School of Pharmacy in Istanbul.

She worked for 13 years as a pharmacist, and she was deputy chair of the board at Pet Holding as well as chair of the board for the Köksal Education Foundation. She was also a member of the Democratic Party Governing Board, and chair of the party's Art Committee.

From 2001 to 2007 she was a member of the Ministry of Justice Penal Institutions and Detention Houses Monitoring Board, a post from which she resigned in April 2007 for reasons of health.

She was married to Prof. Dr. Güntekin Köksal and had two daughters, Ayşe and Zeynep, as well as five grandchildren: Kaya, Ege, Melissa, Rauf and Sinan.

She died on August 19, 2019, due to complications caused by an operation.

== Musical career ==
Her musical training began in Artvin at the age of 9 with mandolin and violin lessons from Hasan Çıtak (1955–57). At the age of 15 she took accordion lessons in Kayseri (1961–62), and at 36 piano lessons from Veli Gerasim. It was at this time that she made her first compositions (1982–83). Her very first composition was "With You I'm Full, Without You an Empty Shell" (Waltz of Happiness), a work in the Acemkürdi makam for which she wrote the words as well as the music. Her first lessons in Turkish Art Music came from the late composer and artist Sadi Hoşses (1984). After 1996 she studied for an extended period from the tanburist and composer Yılmaz Pakalınlar. Köksal played the lute and has composed some 120 works, of which 74 are in the TRT (Turkish Radio and Television Corporation) repertory. A number of her compositions have been arranged polyphonically, while her works are performed throughout Turkey by various choirs, as well as being rendered on radio stations and television channels. In the year 2000 her album "İçimdeki Duygular" was released, comprising works performed by TRT and Ministry of Culture artists.

Hers were the first Turkish art music compositions to be performed polyphonically, on December 16, 2003, by the Orfeon Chamber Chorus with soprano Leyla Çolakoğlu, tenor Hakan Aysev and bass Deva Çolakoğlu under the direction of conductor Bujor Hoinic. Her works were sung in the musical fantasy Cabaret Opera staged by the State Opera and Ballet Company and directed by Gürçil Çeliktaş, and this work became part of the opera repertory (2004–2005). Her works have also been performed by symphony orchestras.

Her works are mentioned in three books by the composer Turhan Taşan, Women Composers (2000), Pharmacist Artists in Turkish Music (2001) and Doctor and Pharmacist Artists in Turkish Music (2011). In his master's dissertation "Steps Toward Modernization in Turkish Music During the Republican Era" (2004) the kanun artist and composer Halil Altınköprü gives composer Köksal's works as examples. She has also served on the jury in the Turkish-Style Music Composition Contest held by TRT. Her compositions also appear in The Collected Works of Turkish Art Music Composers by Rahmi Kalaycıoğlu. In addition, her instrumental works are part of Kanun Egzersizleri ve Eğitimi (Exercises and Training for the Kanun), a book by the kanun artist and composer Özdemir Hafızoğlu, who is on the faculty of the music department at the K.T.U. Fatih School of Education.

Köksal's album Aşk Senfonisi (Symphony of Love), featuring Hakan Aysev and Göksel Baktagir, has been released in October 2010.

In terms of number of works in the TRT repertory she ranks in the top three among the 250 female composers since the 17th century.

== Other interests ==
In addition to all these endeavors she was interested in psychology as well as all branches of art including cinema, painting, the theater and dance, and she was also a photographer. Her first solo exhibition of photography, "Doğanın Çoşkusu", was held in February 2004, and her second, "Doğanın Çoşkusu II", in May 2010. Both shows were held in Ankara.
