= Fatma Turgut =

Turkish musician (born 1984)

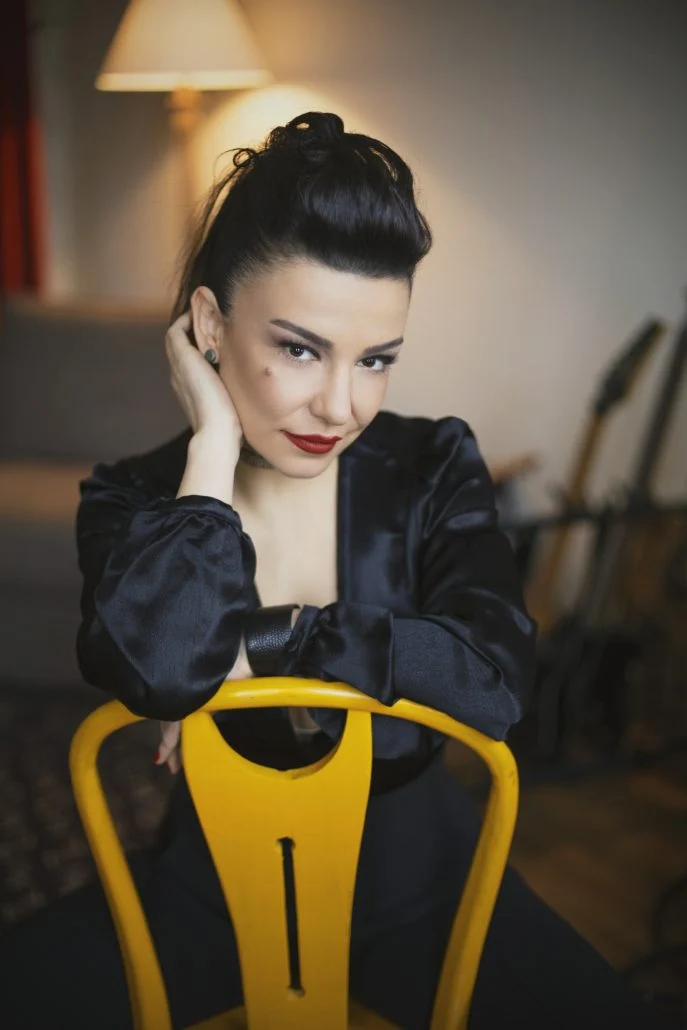

Background information
- Born: 2 January 1984 (age 42); Aydın, Turkey
- Genres: Turkish rock; pop rock
- Occupations: Singer-songwriter; composer; teacher (formerly)
- Instruments: Guitar; piano
- Years active: 2005–present
- Labels: DMC; GNL; Avrupa
- Formerly of: Model

Fatma Turgut (born 2 January 1984) is a Turkish rock music singer.

She completed her primary education in Atatürk Primary School and secondary education in Söke Hilmi Fırat Anatolian High School. In 2003, she entered the Department of Classical Guitar, Dokuz Eylül University. She graduated from there in 2010. Within the education that she received during these years, she had the opportunity to work in areas such as polyphonic choir, singing, Turkish music harmony, and Western music harmony. She also continued her stage work with various amateur rock bands. She worked as a classical guitar and choir teacher in a private music classroom between 2005 and 2008.

In 2007, she joined the rock band "A Due Carmen", which later became the Model. Together with the group, she released three albums, Perili Sirk (2009), Diğer Masallar (2011) and Levlâ'nın Hikayesi (2013). She had the opportunity to have a lot of concerts in many cities. She is currently pursuing her music career as a solo artist.

== Discography ==
=== With Model ===
==== Albums ====
- Perili Sirk (2009)
- Diğer Masallar (2011)
- Levlâ'nın Hikayesi (2013)

==== Singles ====
- Bir Pazar Kahvaltısı feat. Emre Aydın (2014)
- Mey (2016)

=== Solo ===
==== Albums ====
- Elimde Dünya (2019)

==== Singles ====
- Bensiz Bir Sen (feat. You May Kiss The Bride) (2016)
- İlkbaharda Kıyamet (2016)
- Yıllar Sonra (Biz Size Döneriz Soundtrack 2017)
- Aşk Tadında (2018)
- Efsaneyiz (with Ferman Akgül) (2018)
- Bir Varmış Bir Yokmuş (2019)
- Palavra (Fikret Şeneş Şarkıları) (2019)
- Yangın Yeri (with Can Baydar) (2019)
- Dünya Tek Biz İkimiz [Rap Version] (feat. Ayben) (2020)
- Ben Vardım (2021)
- Dünyalar Senin Olsun (2021)
- Aramızda Uçurumlar (with Suat Suna) (2021)
- İkimizden Biri (2022)
- Kalbe Zarar (with Cakal) (2022)
- Bensiz (with Cem Adrian) (2023)
- Umay (with Faun) (2023)
