= İlhan Şeşen =

Turkish musician (1948–2025)

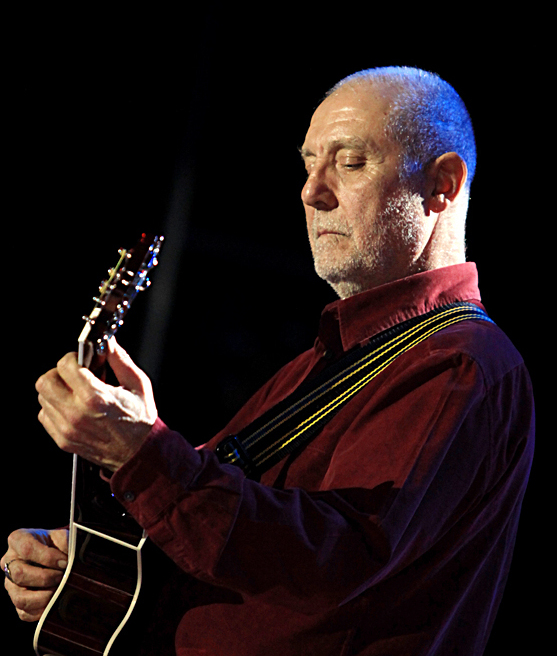
- Şeşen in 2012
- Born: 18 June 1948; Manisa, Turkey
- Died: 26 May 2025 (aged 76); Istanbul, Turkey
- Education: Istanbul University
- Occupations: Musician, singer-songwriter, actor
- Spouse: Arzu Şeşen (m. 1974; div. 1996)
- Children: 2

İlhan Şeşen (18 June 1948 – 26 May 2025) was a Turkish musician, songwriter and actor.

== Life and career ==
İlhan Şeşen was born in Manisa on 18 June 1948. Şeşen began his music career in 1968. In 1971, he released an album named "Kavga". In 1983, he founded Grup Gündoğarken with Gökhan and Burhan Şeşen. In 2001, Şeşen released his second solo album, named "Neler Oluyor Bize?". After that, in 2003, Şeşen released "Ben Bu Şarkıları Kime Söyleyeyim?". After the release of this album, he took a role in the TRT TV show Mühürlü Güller. In 2004, he took a role in famous television show Aliye. In 2005, he released his fourth album, "Aşk Yalan". In 2007, he continued his television career with several additional television shows. Famous song of Leman Sam, named "Rüzgar" is one of the songs written by İlhan Şeşen.

Şeşen died of lung cancer in Istanbul on 26 May 2025, at the age of 76.

== Albums ==
- Aşk Haklı (1994) (Türker Production)
- Neler Oluyor Bize (2001) (DMC)
- Şimdi Ben Bu Şarkıları Kime Söyleyeyim (2003) (DMC)
- Aşk Yalan (2005) (DMC)
- İlhan Şeşen (2006) (DMC)
- Gel (14 July 2014) (Aşk Müzik Production)
- Yedi Bölge İki Gölge (15 February 2017) (Poll)
- İstanbul'lu Şarkılar (26 May 2017) (Sony)
- Ciddi Eğlence (20 April 2018) (Sony)
- Akustik Hikayeler (2 October 2020) (Sony)
- Basmakalıp (23 September 2022) (Sony)

== Filmography ==
- Aşk Üzerine Söylenmemiş Her Şey (1995)
- Cesur Kuşku (2001)
- Yeditepe İstanbul (2001)
- Bir Tatlı Huzur (2002)
- Mumya Firarda (2002)
- Mühürlü Güller (2003)
- Aliye (2004)
- Çocuğun Var Derdin Var (2004)
- Annem (2007)
- Şöhret Okulu (2007)
- Gönülçelen (2010)
- Anadolu Kartalları (2011)
- Bir Günah Gibi (2011)
- Hayatımın Rolü (2012)
- Görüş Günü Kadınları (2013)
- Asla Vazgeçme (2014)
- Gönül İşleri (2014)
- Paramparça (2015)
- Milat (2015)
- Saklı (2015)
- The Yetimler (2015)
- Aşk Yalanı Sever (2016)
- Propaganda 2 (2016)
- Saklambaç (2016)
- Tatlı Şeyler (2017)
- Elli Kelimelik Mektuplar (2021)
- Alabora Aşk (2022)
- Propaganda 2 Ana (2023)

== See also ==
- Grup Gündoğarken
