= Tuğçe San =

Turkish singer and musician

- Born: 24 December 1971 (age 53); İzmir, Turkey
- Genres: pop
- Occupation(s): Singer, musician
- Years active: 1996–present

Tuğçe San (born 24 December 1971) is a Turkish singer and musician. She first became known with her song "Neredesin?" ("Where are you?") in 1996.

== Albums ==
- Tuğçe San (1996)
- Ha Ha Ha (1997)
- Devam Devam (1998)

=== Hit songs ===
- "Neredesin?" (1996)
- "Güneşten Sıcak" (1996)
- "Ha Ha Ha" (1997)
- "Tempo" (1998)

== Other websites ==
- turkpopmuzik.net page
