= 3 Hürel =

Turkish rock band

- Origin: Trabzon, Turkey
- Genres: Anatolian rock
- Years active: 1970–1977, 1996–1999
- Labels: Diskotür, Ada Müzik
- Past members: Onur Hürel; Haldun Hürel; Feridun Hürel

3 Hürel (Turkish pronunciation: [ytʃ.hyɾæl]), also stylized as 3 Hür-El or Üç Hürel, was a Turkish rock band, formed in 1970 by siblings Onur, Haldun and Feridun Hürel. Considered as among Turkey's most popular Anatolian rock bands, the band performed folk-driven pop and rock music and occasionally also paraphrased classic folk songs with considerable ingenuity. Their lyrics generally featured themes such as peace and freedom.

== History ==
Hürel brothers were born in Trabzon and later moved to Istanbul due to family business. In 1966, the brothers formed their first band, Yankılar, which was later renamed to İstanbul Dörtlüsü. The band performed in small music halls and tried to synthesize Turkish music and traditional rock formats. After forming a number of other bands, including Trio Istanbul, Oğuzlar, and Biraderler, Feridun became a member of Selcuk Alagöz Orchestra. Haldun and Onur later joined him to gain experience and earn money for new equipment. In 1970, they left the orchestra to form 3 Hürel.

Following the release of their debut single in 1970, "Ve Ölum/Şeytan Bunun Neresinde," the band released two LPs and more than ten singles in six years. In 1977, Haldun and Feridun left the band for mandatory military service. Coping with the loss of their mother to traffic accident, the brothers quit music. Feridun moved to England but returned without any significant accomplishments, subsequently returning and specializing in advertising. Onur took a job as an instructor and Haldun started a ceramics and textiles business.

3 Hürel reunited in 1996, releasing two records in 1996 and 1999, respectively.

The band's 1970 song, "Ve Ölüm", was featured in 2013 Serge Bozon film, Tip Top.

== Members ==
- Onur Hürel – bass guitar
- Haldun Hürel – drums
- Feridun Hürel – vocals, guitar, sax

== Discography ==
Studio albums

- 3 Hür-El' (1972)
- Hürel Arşivi (1974)
- Efsane Yeniden (1996)
- 1953 Hürel (1999)

Singles

- "Gurbet Türküsü" / "Didaydom" (1970)
- "Şeytan Bunun Neresinde" / "Ve Ölüm" (1970)
- "Pembelikler" / "Ağıt" (1971)
- "Bir Mevsim Daha Geçti" / "Keçi Vurdum Çayıra" (1972)
- "Lazoğlu" / "Gül'e Ninni" (1972)
- "Yara" / "Döner Dünya" (1972)
- "Ağlarsa Anam Ağlar" / "Kara Yazı" (1973)
- "Canım Kurban" / "Anadolu Dansı" (1973)
- "Madalyonun Ters Yüzü" / "Haram" (1973)
- "Ömür Biter Yol Bitmez" / "Sevenler Ağlarmış" (1974)
- "Gönül Sabreyle Sabreyle" / "Küçük Yaramaz" (1975)
- "Hoptirinom" / "Mutluluk Bizim Olsun" (1975)
- "Boştur Boş" / "Ben Geçerim Gönül Geçmez" (1976)

Compilations

- Volume 1 (1994)
- Volume 2 (1994)
- Kent Ozanları 1 (1998)
- Eski 45’likler (2000)
- 3 Hürel Şarkıları - Sonsuza Kadar (2008)
