= Ali Ekber Çiçek =

Turkish musician (1935–2006)

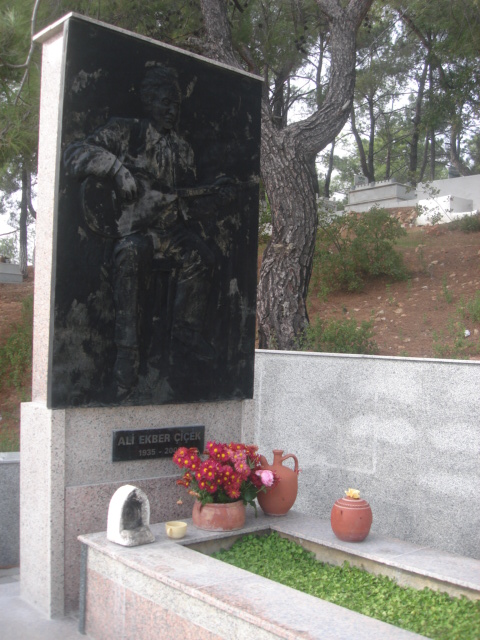

Ali Ekber Çiçek (1935 – 26 April 2006) was a Turkish folk musician.

== Biography ==
Çiçek was born in 1935, in Erzincan, Turkey. His father died in the Erzincan Earthquake and thus Çiçek worked as a farmer at a young age. Financial problems limited him to an elementary school education. Nevertheless, he attended Alevi gatherings called cem, where he became familiar with both playing bağlama and the philosophy of Alevism.

He moved to Istanbul with his aunt at age 9 and made acquaintance with popular folk musicians. He was on a TV programme called 'Yurttan Sesler' in his first years of adolescence. After completing mandatory military service, he worked at the state-operated radio broadcast TRT service in Ankara, where he lived until his retirement.

In 2003, TRT filmed a documentary about his life and his music, called Cahilden Uzak Dur, Kemale Yakın (Stay close to the cultivated, away from the ignorant). The documentary was intended to propagate his work and presents them as a part of the Anatolian folk tradition.

Throughout his professional career, Ali Ekber Çiçek compiled more than 400 Turkish folk songs and made them known publicly. "Haydar Haydar", which took him approximately three years to master, is one of his most noted songs. The song is often considered the pinnacle of symphonic Turkish folk music.

Markoff says of this composition that Çiçek "was one of the first to engage in compositional activity while experimenting with new approaches to the refashioning of indigenous repertory. In 1965, he created the brilliant composition for voice and baglama, "Haydar." Inspired by mystical poetry of the 18th century, "Haydar" exemplifies Çiçek's efforts to communicate spiritual values through music."

He was married to Turkish folk music singer Cemile Cevher Çiçek for 8 years, but the marriage ended in divorce.
