= Sura İskenderli =

Turkish pop singer

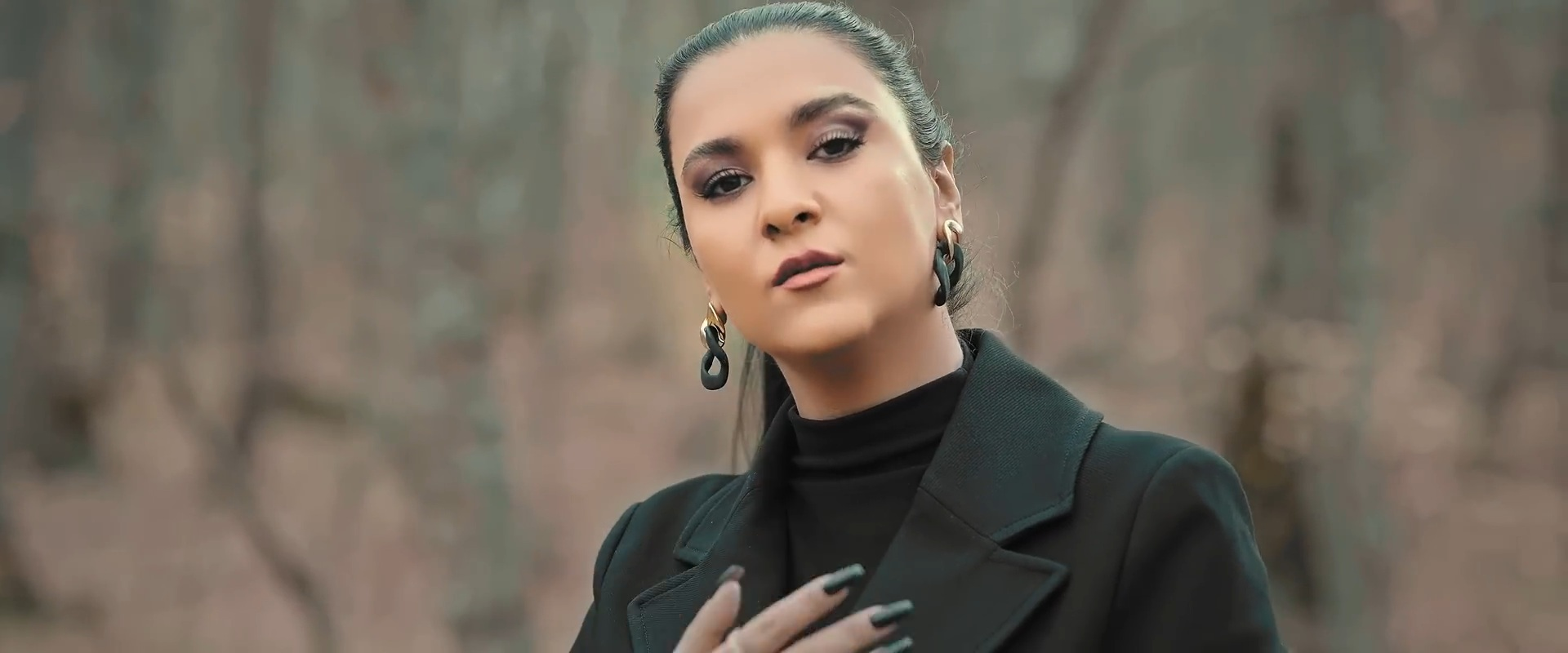

Background information
- Born: 1994 (age 31–32); Baku, Azerbaijan
- Genres: Pop; R&B
- Occupations: Musician; songwriter
- Instrument: Vocals

Sura İskenderli (Azerbaijani: Sura İskəndərli; born 1994) is an Azerbaijani-born Turkish pop singer and songwriter. Her breakthrough came with her songs "Bir Daha Yak" and "Yaram Derinden", which were popular hits in Turkey. In 2019, "Bir Daha Yak" received a nomination as the Song of the Year in Golden Butterfly Awards. In February 2020, she received the Best Debut by a Pop Singer award at the 4th Music Stars Awards.

== Discography ==
=== EPs ===
- Korkularım (2019)

=== Singles ===
- "Niye" (2019)
- "Yaram Derinden" (2019)
- "Dön" (2019)
- "Yalanlar" (2019)
- "Möhtaç" (2019)
- "Korkularım" (2019)
- "Bir Daha Yak" (2019)
- "Hayalet" (2020)
- "Dinle"(2020)
- "Taştan Yürek" (2020)
- "Karanlık" (2021)
- "Sen Al Canımı" (2021)
- "Kandırma" (2021)
- "Yok" (2021)
- "Sen Olmadan" (with Lil Orxan) (2021)
- "Sezenler Olmuş" (Yeni Türkü Zamansız) (2022)
