= Grup Gündoğarken =

Turkish popular music group

- Origin: Turkey
- Genres: Folk rock, Anatolian rock
- Years active: 1983–1994
- Past members: İlhan Şeşen-Gökhan Şeşen-Burhan Şeşen

Grup Gündoğarken (English: Group While Sunrises) was a Turkish popular music group.

The group was founded by İlhan Şeşen in 1983. Other members of the group were his nephews Gökhan Şeşen and Burhan Şeşen. Their early performances were mostly incidental music. They collaborated with Levent Kırca and Ferhan Şensoy for the stage. They also played the generic tune for the TV program "Olacak o Kadar", a successful comedy series. Beginning by 1986, they gave a series of concerts at home and abroad. In 1988, they participated in the Turkish under contest for the Eurovision song Contest of 1988 with their song "Resimler Resimler", but they couldn't win the contest. Probably their most notable hit was " Ankara'dan Abim Geldi " of 1992. After 1994, the group disbanded. But they still play in some concerts.

== Album discography ==
Name	Year
Bir Yaz Daha Bitiyor	1986
Yaz Bulutları	1988
Bir Günlük Aşk	1989
Ankara'dan Abim Geldi	1992
Best Of Gündoğarken	1998
Gündoğarken 99	1999
İstanbul Atina İstanbul	2000
Hayat Bu	2008
Bir Yaz Daha Bitiyor + Yaz Bulutları (Double CD)	2008
