= Ahmet Sendil =

Turkish music producer, remixer and DJ (born 1973)

- Also known as: DJ Met
- Born: October 16, 1973 (age 52); Antalya, Turkey
- Genres: Minimal, Techno, Tech House
- Occupations: DJ, Record Producer, Remixer
- Instruments: Mixer, Synthesizer, Keyboards
- Years active: 1989–present
- Label: Bosphorus Underground Recordings

Ahmet Sendil is a Turkish music producer, remixer and DJ who was an influential part of Electronic Music scene in Turkey in the late 1980s and a leading performer and producer of minimal since the early 1990s.

== Early life ==
Ahmet Sendil was born on 16 October 1973 in Antalya, Turkey.

== Musical career ==
Taking an interest in the newly introduced electronic music genre, Şendil started his musical career in 1989. He was amongst the pioneers of Electronic Music in Turkey, DJing at Studio 54 Istanbul, one of the first nightclubs in Turkey. In the 1990s, he played in almost every major club in Turkey, including X-tacy, Club 12, Moonlight and High End. He was offered being the resident DJ for Switch Club, then the largest club in Istanbul, which he accepted in 2000.

In 2007, Sendil formed his record labels M-Vitamine and Bosphorus Underground Recordings.

After producing several tracks and remixes that reached #1 under Minimal category on Beatport's Top 100 Charts, Ahmet was nominated for Best Minimal Artist and awarded the 3rd place in 2008.

After being recognized abroad, Sendil started performing in international clubs and festivals. He has played guest spot in Turnmills in London and The Warehouse Project in Manchester. He has also performed in festivals such as Dance Valley, WMC Miami, Electronica Global Gathering Istanbul, Creamfields Istanbul and MTV Dance Festival Istanbul. He has performed alongside many DJs/bands, including Stacey Pullen, Dave Clarke, Dave Angel, Darren Roach, Jerome Pacman, Derrick May, Moloko, Red Snapper, Kosheen and Massive Attack.

Sendil is currently actively performing and producing under his own label Bosphorus Underground Recordings.

== Discography ==
Singles & EPs & Remixes

- Ahmet Sendil - Hardener EP (2008) [Bosphorus Underground Recordings]
- Ahmet Sendil - Toronto EP (2008) [Bosphorus Underground Recordings]
- Utku Dalmaz - Don't Get Lost (Ahmet Sendil Remix) (2008) [Bosphorus Underground Recordings]
- Ahmet Sendil - Are Your Kisses Dynamite EP (2008) [Sender Records]
- Andrea Roma - Long' (Ahmet Sendil Remix) (2008) [Mystika Records]
- Mario Miranda - Loca Banda (Ahmet Sendil Remix) (2008) [Bosphorus Underground Recordings]
- Alex Kenji - Adelante (Ahmet Sendil Remix) (2009) [303Lovers]
- Turn Giddy - Tokyo (Ahmet Sendil Remix) (2009) [Bosphorus Underground Recordings]
- Ahmet Sendil & Koen Groeneveld - Rotate EP (2009) [Bosphorus Underground Recordings]
- Tocadisco & Koen Groeneveld & Ahmet Sendil - 2 Many Shots Of Jagermeister EP (2009) [Superstar Recordings]
- Sivana - Feels Like I'm Dancing (Ahmet Sendil Remix) (2009) [Bazooka Records]
- Martin Eyerer & Namito - Ripcurl (Ahmet Sendil Remix) (2010) [Kickboxer Recordings]
- Lissat & Voltaxx - High & Horny (Ahmet Sendil Remix) (2010) [Toolroom]
- Ahmet Sendil & Koen Groeneveld & R3hab - Istandam EP (2010) [Bosphorus Underground Recordings]
- Koen Groeneveld & Ahmet Sendil & Arturo Silvestre - Dordogne EP (2010) [BluFin]
- Phunk Investigation - Belo Horizonti (Ahmet Sendil Remix) (2011) [Global Underground]
- Ahmet Sendil - I Still Have A Dream (2011) [Bosphorus Underground Recordings]
- Ahmet Sendil - You So Strong (2012) [1605]
- Tocadisco & Koen Groeneveld & Ahmet Sendil - Oldschool (2012) [Toolroom]
- Ahmet Sendil - Get Down (2013) [Rabies Records]
- Ahmet Sendil - Where Are My Headphones (2013) [Bosphorus Underground Recordings]
- D-Unity - Prophet (Ahmet Sendil Remix) (2014) [Yoshitoshi Recordings]

Compilations & Albums

- Nico Diorio - Shop (Ahmet Sendil Remix) (2009) Strictly Erick Morillo - Deluxe DJ Edition, [Strictly Rhythm]
- Koen Groeneveld & Ahmet Sendil - Flaps 128 (Ahmet Sendil Remix) (2009) Spinnin' Deep Presents : Tech-House Essentials, [Spinnin Deep (Spinnin)]
- Federico Milani - Hooker (Ahmet Sendil Remix) (2009) Best of Bosphorus Underground, [Bosphorus Underground Recordings]
- Ahmet Sendil & Koen Groeneveld & R3hab - Istandam (Ahmet Sendil Kasimpasa Rulez Mix) (2010) Stefano Noferini Club Edition Ibiza Session 2010, [Deeperfect Records]
- Hardfloor & Yello - Vicious Games (Ahmet Sendil Summer In Bosphorus Remix) (2010) Ibiza Weapons 2010, [Tiger Records]
- Ahmet Sendil - In Koln With Lissat (Original Club Mix) (2010) Leaders Of The New School Present Lissat And Voltaxx, [Toolroom]
- Ahmet Sendil & Koen Groeneveld & R3hab - Istandam (Ahmet Sendil Kasimpasa Rulez Mix) (2010) Matinee Winter 2011, [Blanco y Negro]
- Ahmet Sendil & Koen Groneveld & Arturo Silvestre - Dordogne (Ahmet Sendil Vocal In Love Remix) (2011) Stefano Noferini Club Edition Spring Session 2011, [Deeperfect Records]
- Koen Groeneveld & Ahmet Sendil - Turboprop (Ahmet Sendil Remix) (2011) Sharam Live At Warung Beach Brazil, [Yoshitoshi Recordings]
- Ahmet Sendil - I Still Have A Dream (Original Mix) (2011) Umek The Riot! Vol.2, [1605]
- Phunk Investigation - Belo Horizonti (Ahmet Sendil Remix) (2012) Global Underground 2012, [Global Underground]
- Phunk Investigation - Belo Horizonti (Ahmet Sendil Remix) (2012) Ministry Of Sound Live : Brazil, [Ministry Of Sound (UK)]
- Ahmet Sendil & Koen Groneveld & Arturo Silvestre - Dordogne (Ahmet Sendil Vocal In Love Remix) (2012) Techno Masterbeats, [Tiger Records]
- Tocadisco & Koen Groeneveld & Ahmet Sendil - Oldschool (Ahmet Sendil Mix) (2012) Toolroom Knights Mixed By Forza, [Toolroom]
- Ahmet Sendil - No Way (Original Mix) (2013) Minimal Tech Beats 001, [Bosphorus Underground Recordings]
- Tocadisco & Koen Groeneveld & Ahmet Sendil - Oldschool (Ahmet Sendil Mix) (2013) Toolroom Miami Essentials 2013, [Toolroom]
- Tocadisco & Koen Groeneveld & Ahmet Sendil - 2 Many Shots Of Jagermeister (Ahmet Sendil Remix) (2013) Berlin Berlin - The Underground Collection Vol.5, [Superstar Recordings]
