= Twenty7 =

Twenty7 (27)
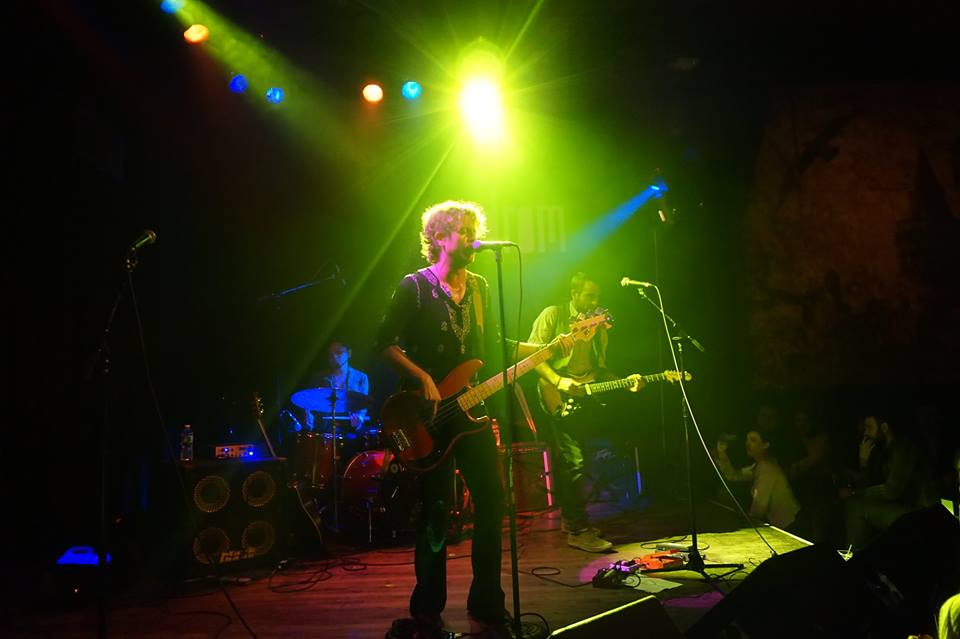
- Twenty7 (27) performing in New York

Background information
- Origin: Los Angeles, USA
- Genres: World music/rock
- Years active: 2009–present
- Members: Okan Şarlı (vocals and bass); Murat Arıkan (guitar); Saddler Samayoa (drums)
- Website: Official website

Twenty7 (27) or with Turkish equivalent yirmi7 is a world music/rock band based in Los Angeles that primarily plays rock with a fusion of ethnic music influences. Its three current members are Okan Şarlı (vocals and bass), Murat Arıkan (guitar), and Saddler Samayoa (drums). Former members include Alper Çakır, Volkan Barut, and David "Daveedo" McCullough.

The band chose its name to commemorate the legendary musicians that died at the age of 27, such as Jimi Hendrix, Jim Morrison, Kurt Cobain, among others.

== Career ==
Twenty7 first appeared on national television in an interview with MTV Turkey and featured Janset as a back-up vocalist when the band performed in Istanbul, Turkey, in 2009.

In 2012, the band's "No Chemical Love" from their Papaptya E.P. was nominated for Best Indie Rock Song at the Artists in Music Awards and their single "Second Mind" was featured in the film About Cherry, starring Ashley Hinshaw, James Franco, Heather Graham, and Dev Patel.

In December 2012, Twenty7 kicked off its first US tour as an opening act for Gripin with stops in New York, Boston, Washington DC, Los Angeles, San Francisco, and San Diego. In March 2013, it joined Mor ve Ötesi as a special guest on a sold-out US West Coast tour.

In Turkey, Twenty7 takes on the name of 27 and started to collaborate with Gripin in writing and producing songs in Turkish in 2015. Their first single “Muhtemel Aşk,” which features the lead singer of Gripin, reached #1 in iTunes in Turkey within 2 weeks of its release.

The band sings in both English and Turkish.

== Discography ==
=== EPs ===
- Love is a Game (2013)
- Papatya (2010)

=== Singles ===
- Muhtemel Aşk (2015)
- Second Mind (2008)
