= Sibel Bilgiç =

Turkish singer and businesswoman (born 1971)

- Born: 1 November 1971 (age 54); Ankara, Turkey
- Occupations: Singer, businesswoman
- Musical career
- Genres: Pop
- Years active: 1996–present
- Labels: Banko; Seyhan

Sibel Bilgiç (born 1 November 1971) is a Turkish singer and businesswoman.

== Life and career ==
=== 1971–96: Early years and career beginnings ===
Bilgiç was born in Ankara in 1971. In July 1986, together with her elder sister Ulya Bilgiç, she participated in the Müzik Maratonu contest organized by TRT. In an episode published from the contest in August 1986, Sibel Bilgiç performed a song in front of the judges Hulusi Kentmen, Seden Kızıltunç, Nursal Tekin, Bilgen Bengü and Handan Kocabalkan. She went to the United States with a scholarship she earned while studying at Ankara Atatürk Anatolian High School and got her high school diploma there. While studying at high school in Turkey, she took singing and choral lessons in Ankara State Conservatory.

Upon her return to Turkey, Bilgiç started performing at Best Hotel and Karpiç Bar. In 1990, she worked as a backing vocalist for Zerrin Özer. She started her professional music career by singing jazz and smooth jazz songs at Hilton Ankara Hotel. During this period, together with Nilgün Belgün and Volkan Severcan, she presented a cabaret. On the one hand, she studied at the Department of English Language and Literature at Hacettepe University School of Letters. During her education, she worked as a sales manager in an American company.

=== 1996–present: Music and business life ===
Bilgiç, who initially did not intend to make an album, later decided to switch to a more professional career and made a deal with Banko Müzik through Ercan Saatçi. After one year of preparation, in October 1996 the album Alışamadım was released. The album's lead single, also titled "Alışamadım", was a hit and became one of the most listened Turkish pop songs of that year.

She starred in the 13-episode series Yalan Dünya, which premiered on Star TV in April 1997, and also performed the main theme song for the series composed by Aykut Gürel. She took a break from her professional music career as she started a relationship with Mehmet Ali Yılmaz in October 1997. With the end of her relationship in 2005, she opened a laser hair removal center.

In the 2005–2006 season of the Casablanca musical, organized by Tiyatro Kedi, she played the character "Ilsa", originally portrayed by Ingrid Bergman in 1942. Although she announced that she would release a single in 2006, this single was not released. In December 2007 she married the businessman Ulvi Süvarioğlu. They divorced 1.5 months later. She was treated for throat cancer in 2008.

In 2008, she announced that she would release a single called "Bilemedin" composed based on a poem written by Can Dündar, but this single was not released. In the same year, she started to actively perform on stage. She continued to work as a businesswoman simultaneously.

In 2012, she released her EP Aşk Çarpsın Beni. In 2014, she announced that music videos from this album would not be broadcast on any music channels. She married the industrialist Ali Bellikan on 26 August 2017. She started jewellery designing in 2019. On 28 May 2020, she released a cover of the single "Diyemedim".

Sibel Bilgiç continues her music and business life simultaneously.

== Discography ==
- Alışamadım (album – 1996)
- Aşk Çarpsın Beni (EP – 2012)
- "Diyemedim" (single – 2020)
