= Nez (singer) =

Turkish singer and dancer

- Born: Nezihe Kalkan; April 15, 1979 (age 47); Bakırköy, Istanbul, Turkey
- Genres: Pop, electronic
- Occupation: Musician
- Years active: 2002–present
- Labels: Erol Köse; Seyhan
- Website: yuzdeyuznez.com

Nezihe Kalkan (born April 15, 1979), better known as Nez, is a Turkish singer and dancer known for her modern-oriental hybrid dancing style combined with techno-inspired pop music.

She spent a long time in the UK for education and after returning to her home country in early 2000s, she started performing regularly in a renowned jazz club in Istanbul with a unique show. She was an actor in the Fox Turkey's sitcom Sıkı Dostlar ("good friends") with Haluk Bilginer and Özkan Uğur.

== Discography ==
Albums

- Sakın Ha (2002)
- %100 (2006)

EPs

- Nez Zamanı (2011)
- It’s a Game (2012)
- Nez & Retro Turca (2014)

Singles

- "Gönül Su Bende (Kelepçe)" (2004)
- "I See You" (2008)
- "Senin Annen Olamam Ben" (2017)
- "Titanium" (2021)
- "Bruce Lee" (2022)
- "Rüya" (2023)
- "Dream to your Illusion" (2023)
