= Pınar (company) =

Turkish dairy company

- Type: Public company
- Industry: Dairy products
- Founded: 1973
- Founder: Yaşar Holding
- Headquarters: Izmir, Turkey
- Areas served: Turkey, Cyprus
- Products: strained yogurt, ayran, cheese, kefir, cream, butter, milk, petit suisse, meat, sausages, water
- Parent: Yaşar Holding
- Website: http://www.pinar.com.tr/default.aspx

Pınar (transl. Fountain) is a Turkish dairy company.

== History ==
Pınar was founded in 1973 by Yaşar Holding. After its founding it began producing dairy products such as cheese, yogurt, butter and sour cream. The company was the first in Turkey to produce processed cheese and cocoa on an industrial scale.

In 1980 the company began collaborating with Kraft Foods for producing various types of cheese. In 1981 a sales structure was established in Istanbul, and later the company entered international markets, beginning exports of dairy products to Central Europe, Middle East and Northern Cyprus.

In 1982 company created in Menderes (district of Izmir where the company was founded) the first bottled water producer in Turkey called «Pınar Water». Later in 1985 was established the first modern integrated meat processing plant in the country with the name Pınar Meat. In 1987 subsidiarie Çamlı Besicilik was founded to introduce the North American model of open-air cattle farming and fish feed production to Turkey.

Pınar also began producing Turkey's first hamburger patties, sauces and syrups for the chain of collaboration with McDonald's. Also company developed and exported the frozen food business, including fish and seafood.

Pınar introduced the organic milk in 2005 and organic yogurt in 2011. Then added mineral water was to the product range in 2013. Then launched a number of new products (baked goods, meat products, yogurts, and cheeses) and won the «Brand Voice» award at the Pınar Felis competition in 2014.

After the 2017 Turkish constitutional referendum Selim Yaşar who was a Yaşar Holding chairman was found himself at the center of a controversy due to his social media posts. He raised the possibility of ending his sponsorship of the Karşıyaka basketball team, which sparked a backlash. He later deleted the posts and apologized. After that holding company emphasized that his personal views do not reflect the company's position. Despite this, the government and public organizations launched a boycott campaign against Pınar products, which led to a significant decline in sales. There were also calls to boycott KFC and McDonald's, which use the company's products.
