= Çetin Işıközlü =

Turkish composer

Çetin Işıközlü (1939) is a Turkish composer. His works included the opera Gülbahar.

== Works ==
- The Legend of Mount Ararat 1959, premiered 1969 opera
- Judith - ballet based on the tale of Judith and Holofernes.

== Recordings ==
- Ağrı Dağı Efsanesi - The Legend of Mount Ararat Ankara State Opera & Ballet Orchestra, Erol Erdinc
