= Ahmet Faik Şener =

Turkish harmonica player

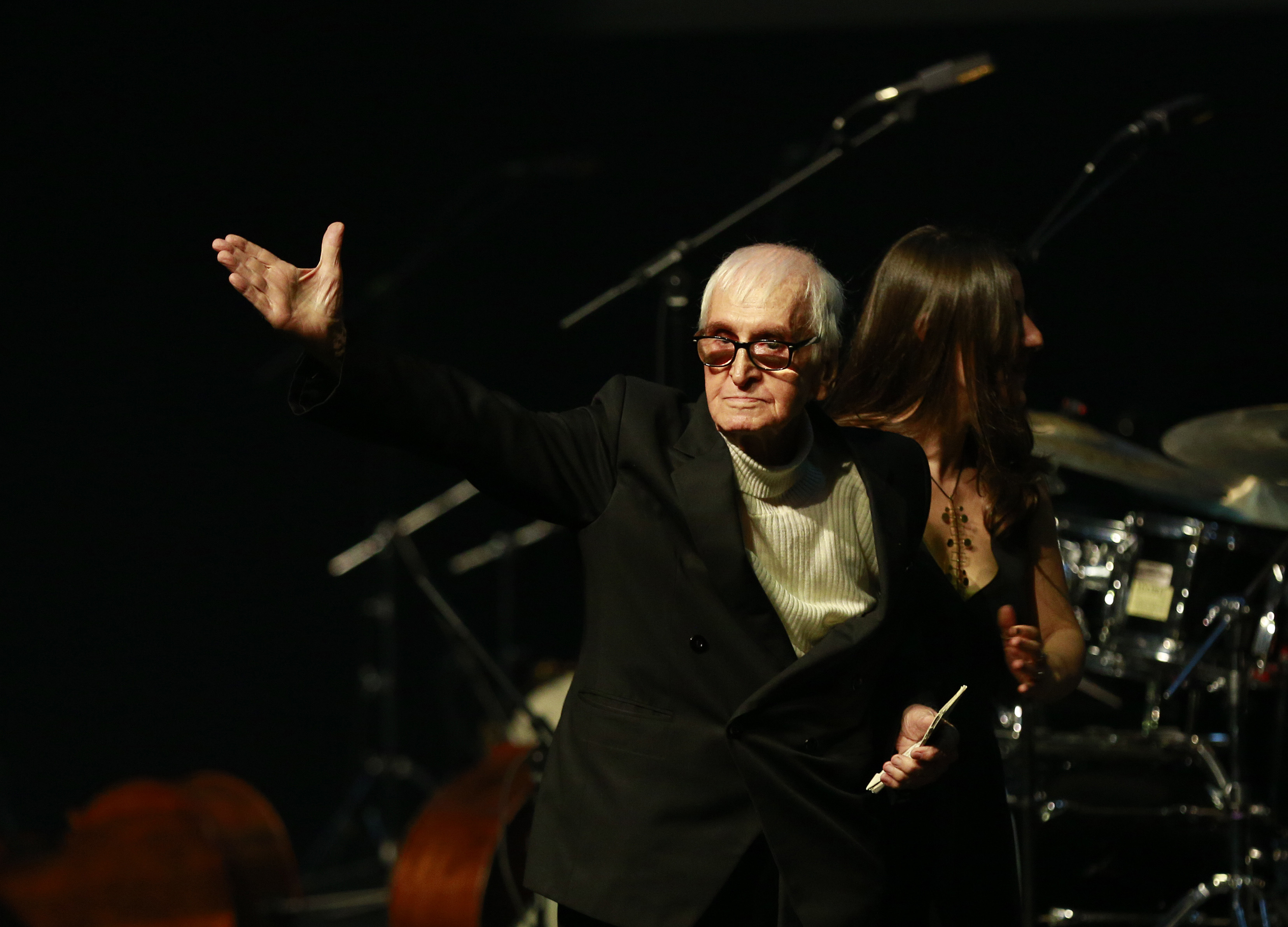

Background information
- Born: 1925; Gemlik, Turkey
- Died: 28 June 2022 (aged 96–97) Zeytinburnu, Istanbul, Turkey
- Genres: Caz
- Instrument: harmonica

Ahmet Faik Şener (1925 – 28 June 2022), was a Turkish mouth harmonica virtuoso.

Known as Balarısı Ahmet, he was known as the virtuoso of harmonica in Turkey. He has interpreted almost all kinds of works from classical music to folk music, with his harmonica.

== Life ==
He acquired his first harmonica in primary school. He founded his first musical ensemble, Balarları (Honeybee), with Şerif Yüzbaşıoğlu, on the piano and Şefik Uyguner on the flute during his university years. He was studying law. Besides harmonica, he played accordion and rhythm instruments while singing. Balarları became one of the famous ensembles of the period.

== Rewards ==
The Lifetime Achievement Award was presented to Ahmet Faik Şener in a ceremony organized by the Istanbul Foundation for Culture and Arts (İstanbul Kültür Sanat Vakfı) (IKSV) in the Istanbul Jazz Festival (In Turkish İstanbul Caz Festivali), which celebrated its 25th anniversary in 2018.
