= Adnan Şenses =

Turkish musician and actor (1935–2013)

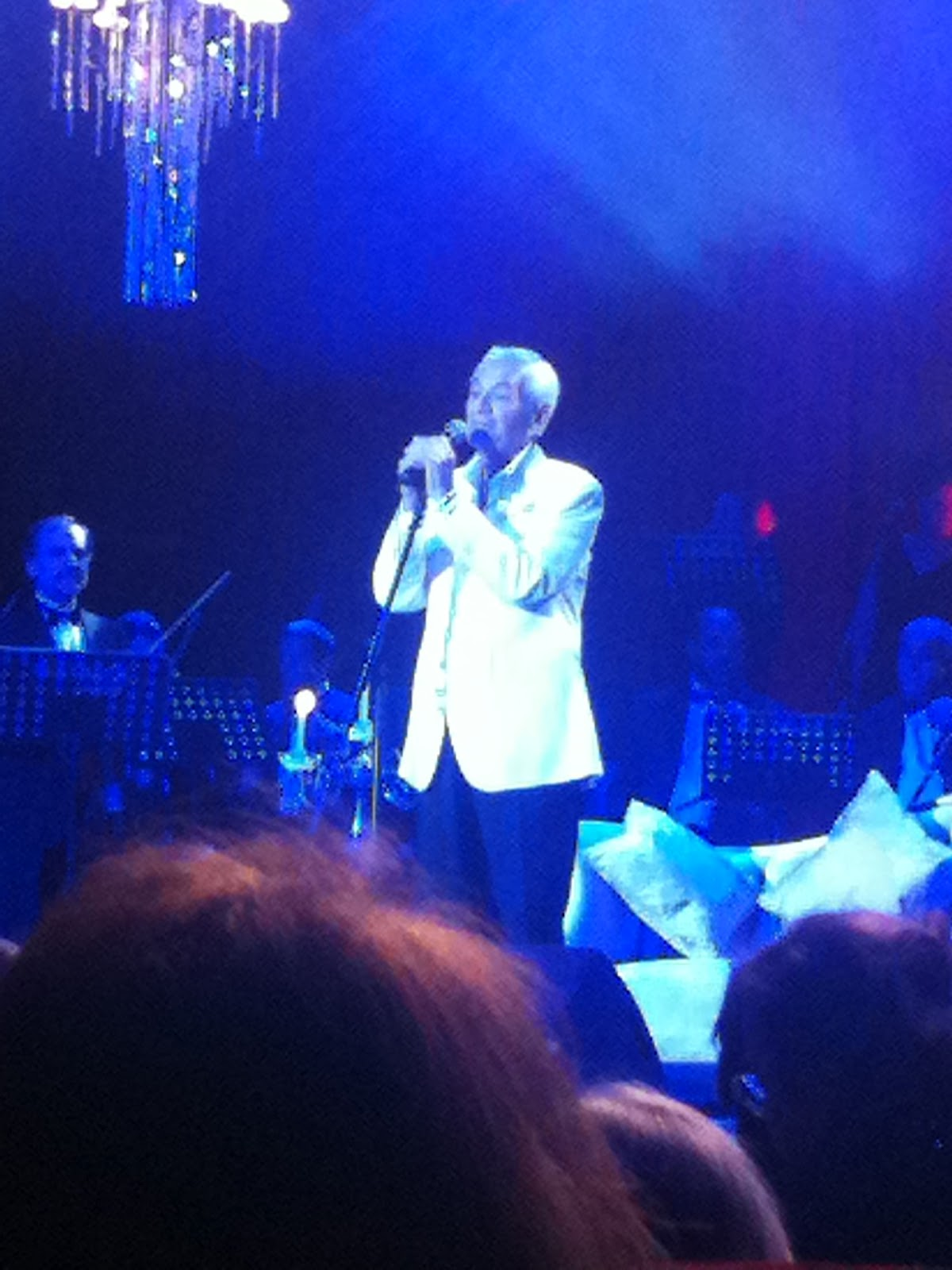
- Şenses in April 2012

Background information
- Born: 21 August 1935; Bursa, Turkey
- Died: 25 December 2013 (aged 78) Istanbul, Turkey
- Occupations: Film actor, singer, song-writer
- Years active: 1956–2013

Adnan Şenses (21 August 1935 – 25 December 2013) was a Turkish musician and actor.

== Biography ==
Şenses was born on 21 August 1935 in Bursa. He is uncle of actresses Gülşen Bubikoğlu and Nilgün Bubikoğlu and of football manager Muhsin Ertuğral. He was schooled in Ankara and continued his education later at Karagümrük neighborhood of Fatih district in Istanbul. In 1956, he began his singing career. Şenses was employed by Radio Ankara, where he served 16 years long. Then, he appeared on the stage of many major music halls, and played in a total of 47 Yeşilçam films. He released 54 rpms, 29 (7 of them were LPs) albums during his music career.

== Death ==
Şenses died of respiratory failure on 25 December 2013 at the age of 78 in an Istanbul hospital after two weeks of hospitalization. He had been suffering from stomach cancer for about three years.

He was buried at the Zincirlikuyu Cemetery following a religious funeral held at Teşvikiye Mosque. He was survived by his wife Lale Şenses.

== Discography ==
Year	Album	Label
1980	Adnan Şenses - İnci Şanlı	Uzelli
1981	25. Sanat Yılı	Uzelli
1981	Süper	Türküola
1982	Almanya Hatıralarım	Minareci
1983	Gönlüm Ve Ben	Yaşar Kekeva
1983	Yansın Bu Dünya	Türküola
1984	Adnan Şenses - Kamuran Akkor	Türküola
1984	Gönlümde İsyan	Türküola
1987	İsyan Ederim	Uzelli
1991	İlk Defa Ağladım	Uzelli
1992	Senede Bir Gün	Aras
1993	Gözümün Bebeği	Fono
1994	Dokunmayın Bana	Fono
1994	Şüphe	Minareci
1994	Dönme Sevgilim	Yaşar Kekeva
1995	Senin Olmaya Geldim	Türküola
1995	Yağmur Gözlüm	Devran
1996	Nasihat	Marş
1997	Sensizliği Taşıyamam	Prestij
2000	Elveda	Prestij
2004	Sen İstemesen de	Doğan Müzik Yapım
2006	Adnan Şenses Klasikleri	Seyhan Müzik
2013	Adnan Şenses Bir Efsanedir	Seyhan Müzik

== Filmography ==
- 1960 Fakir Şarkıcı
- 1961 Ümitsiz Bekleyiş
- 1961 Minnoş
- 1961 Gönlüm Yaralı
- 1963 Avare Şoför
- 1964 Şu Kızların Elinden
- 1964 On Korkusuz Adam
- 1964 Anlatamam Utanırım
- 1965 Şıngırdak Melahat
- 1965 Melek Yüzlü Caniler
- 1965 Dağ Çiçeği
- 1966 Seni Bekleyeceğim
- 1966 Çılgın Gençlik
- 1966 Boğaziçi Şarkısı
- 1970 Çileli Bülbül
- 1971 Senede Bir Gün
- 1972 Cesurlar
- 1972 O Ağacın Altında
- 1973 Elbet Birgün Buluşacağız
- 1974 Eski Kurtlar
- 1975 Ah Nerede Vah Nerede
- 1977 Yansın Bu Dünya
- 1985 Çalınan Hayat
- 1986 Karım Beni Aldatırsa
- 1984 Gönlüm ve Ben

== See also ==
- List of Turkish musicians
