= Model (band) =

Turkish rock band

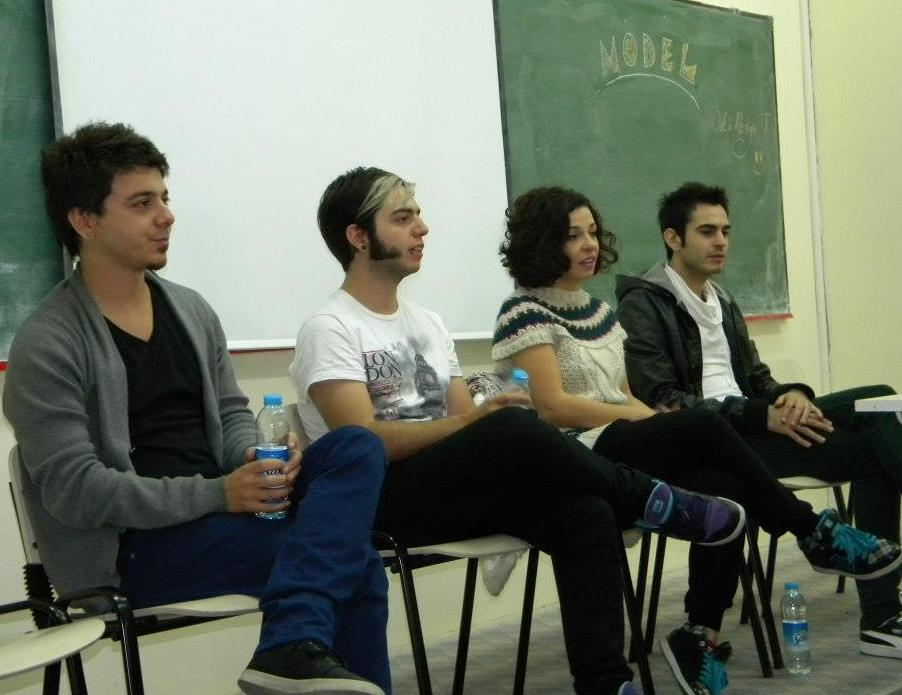
- Model at METU (2012)

Background information
- Origin: İzmir, Turkey
- Genres: Alternative rock, pop rock
- Years active: 2005 — 2016, 2026 — present
- Label: GNL
- Past members: Serkan Gürüzümcü; Aşkın Çolak; Burak Yerebakan; Fatma Turgut; Okan Işık; Can Temiz; Kerem Sedef

Model is a Turkish rock band based in İzmir, Turkey.

== History ==
The band was founded with the name "A due Carmen" in 2005 by Okan Işık, Aşkın Çolak and Can Temiz. Fatma Turgut and Serkan Gürüzümcü joined in 2007. The band members found each other on the internet. The group's name was changed to Model in 2008. Their first album, Perili Sirk was released in 2009.

In 2011, Model released its second album, called Diğer Masallar, which was produced by Demir Demirkan. Three songs, "Buzdan Şato", "Değmesin Ellerimiz", "Bir Melek Vardı", became very popular.

In 2012, Aşkın Çolak left the band and was replaced by Kerem Sedef on drums.

Their third album, Levlâ'nın Hikayesi, was put on the market by the label of GNL Entertainment in the last week of the November 2013. The album focuses on separation and the five stages of grief.

The band disbanded in 2016 due to differences between the members.

The band has reconciled their differences and is active as of June 9th 2026, with their newest track "Ölürüm Daha İyi" being released July 16th 2026.

== Awards ==
2010 Digital Age Awards - Most Innovative Music / Sound Design winner song composed for Efes Pilsen. The band also won the Billboard Special Jury Award in Roxy Music Days under the name "A due Carmen"

== Discography ==
- Perili Sirk (2009)
- Diğer Masallar (2011)
- Levlâ'nın Hikayesi (2013)
- Mey (2016)
