= Turhan Taşan =

Turkish musician (born 1948)

Turhan Taşan (born 1948) is a Turkish musician. His songs have been released on 117 records and cassette tapes.

Born on 13 August 1948 in Samsun, Taşan graduated from the Management and Accounting Department of the Istanbul Academy of Economic and Commercial Sciences. When he was 18 years old a record was made of his first composition, a song.

51 of Taşan’s songs are in the TRT Turkish Radio and Television Corporation (TRT) repertory. Of these, five are Tape Monitored and in the Light Turkish Art Music Repertory.

As a writer of lyrics and composer, he has been honored ten times in polls conducted by the newspaper Milliyet to choose the Ten Favorite Songs of the Year. The songs in question are “Kalp Kalbe Karşı Derler” (Heart Beats With Heart) (1984), “Aynı Çatı Altında” (Under The Same Roof) (1987), “Üzüldüğün Şeye Bak” (Just Look What You’re Grieving Over) (1990), “Öptüm Yanaklarından” (Here’s A Kiss For Your Cheeks) (1990), “Biraz Geç Kalmadın Mı?” (Aren’t You Just A Little Bit Late?) (1991), “Sarsam Diyorum” (Oh I Want To Embrace You) (1992), “Oldu mu ya” (Is That Any Way?” (1995 and 1999) and “Gözlerin Kaldı” (You’re Eyes Remain) 1998.

In addition, “Aynı Çatı Altında” won a Hürriyet Newspaper “Golden Butterfly” award in 1987, and in 1990 “Sarsam Diyorum” received Honorable Mention in TRT’s Turkish Art Music Composition Contest (in this contest no entry took First, Second or Third Prize.) Then in 2004, Taşan was awarded Honorable Mention in the TRT Alaturca Composition Contest for a song entitled “Bir Aşk Gerçek, Bir de Ölüm” (Only Love Is Real, That And Death).

Taşan is married with two children. Having worked for 25 years in the private sector, he retired in 1995 under terms of the “Law Governing Artists’ Debt.”

== Books by Turhan Taşan ==
- Women Composers: Biographies, photographs and compositions by 184 Women Composers from the 17th century to the present. (504 Pages, 145 Compositions) Published by Pan Yayıncılık in March 2000.
- Pharmacists In Turkish Music: 155 Pages, 22 Compositions. (26 Pharmacist Composers, Lyric Writers and Performers) Printed in November 2001 by the Union of Turkish Pharmacists.
- Artists From Samsun In Turkish Music: (Two volumes, 1358 pages, 380 Compositions). Printed in November 2007 by the Special Office of Provinces, Governorship of Samsun.
- Music in Amasya and Amasyan Artists in Turkish Music: (488 Pages, 100 Compositions) Printed in 2009 by the Amasya Office of the Governor.

(One 40-page chapter of this book, “Music in Amasya,” was written by Dr. Hüsamettin Olgun.)

- Doctors and Pharmacists in Turkish Music: (72 Medical Doctors, Veterinaries and Dentists plus 6 Pharmacists). (Two Volumes, 978 Pages, 168 Compositions). Printed in September 2010 by the Municipality of Pendik, Istanbul.
- Zeki Müren: His Life and Works: The rights to this book, which includes 96 compositions, were purchased in June 2010 by the Turkish Educational Foundation and the Foot Soldiers’ Foundation, to be published jointly.
