= Nida Tüfekçi =

Turkish folk music artist (1929–1993)

Mehmet Nida Tüfekçi (1 March 1929 – 18 September 1993) was a Turkish folk music artist.

== Personal life ==
Tüfekçi was born on 1 March 1929 in Akdağmadeni, Yozgat. His wife Neriman Altındağ Tüfekçi also was a Turkish folk singer. They left behind a daughter, Gamze (born 1958).

In 1991, he was awarded the title of State Artist, the highest distinction for artists in Turkey. He died on 18 September 1993 in Istanbul of a heart attack.

== Career ==
Tüfekçi sang, played the bağlama and composed folk songs. He was also director and conductor of the TRT's Ankara Radio Turkish Folk Music Ensemble for many years from 1966.

== Legacy ==
A concert was organized in Muğla in his memory on 20 December 2013.

== See also ==
- List of Turkish musicians
