= Soner Özbilen =

Turkish singer (born 1947)

Soner Özbilen (born 1947) is a Turkish folk singer, conductor, and compiler. The origins are Albania (Kosovo)

== Early life ==
Soner Özbilen was born in Boğazlıyan in 1947 from Albanian parents, they were immigrants from Kosovo.

He finished primary and middle school in Boğazlıyan, high school in Istanbul and studied at the Academy of Economy and Finance. Showing great interest in music in the school choir, he attended the Public Music Education Centre in Kadıköy and Aksaray Music Society for a while as a pupil of Orhan Dağlı, Nida Tüfekçi, Neriman Tüfekçi, and Yücel Paşmakçı. In 1966 he won the folk music singer competition organised by Turkish Radio and Television Corporation (TRT) and became a trainee singer. During the three-year training period he studied under Turkish Music masters such as Nida Tüfekçi, Neriman Tüfekçi, Halil Bedii Yönetken and Ahmet Kutsi Tecer. As his training ended in 1969, he was admitted to Turkish Folk Music Group in TRT Istanbul.

== Career ==
Influenced by Nida Tüfekçi (also from Yozgat), Çekiç Ali (from Kırşehir), Ahmet Gazi Ayhan (from Kayseri), Hacı Taşan (from Keskin), Refik Başaran (from Ürgüp) and Muharrem Ertaş (from Kırşehir); Soner Özbilen developed his own style focusing on Rumeli songs for the last ten years.

Along with appearing regularly in concerts and TRT radio-TV programmes, he performed in festivals in many regions of Turkey. He took part in International Music and Folk Dance Festivals organized in Macedonia, France, Spain, Yugoslavia, Kosovo, Libya, Greece, Germany, Switzerland, Russia, and Finland.

Soner Özbilen, who has contributed to Turkish Folk Music repertory by compiling songs from several regions of Turkey, is still working as a singer and as a conductor for TRT.
