= Suat Suna =

- Also known as: The Prince Romantic Music
- Born: 26 May 1975 (age 51); Istanbul, Turkey
- Genres: Pop
- Occupations: Singer, writer, songwriter, musician, producer, arranger
- Instruments: Violin, guitar, piano, oud
- Years active: 1992–present
- Labels: 1 Numara Plak (1993), Emre Plak (1994–1995), Tempa-Foneks (1996–1998), Prestij Müzik (1998–2002), DMC (2004), Seyhan Müzik (2006), Suat Suna Müzik Yapım (2009), Seyhan Müzik (2017–present)
- Website: http://www.suatsuna.com.tr

Suat Suna (born 26 May 1975) is a Turkish pop music singer, composer and songwriter. Throughout his professional music career, he has released 12 studio albums.

== Discography ==
Year	Album-Single name	Producer	Sales
1993	Ansızın Çektin Gittin	Bir Numara Plak	1,000,000 +
1994	Sözüne Kanmam	Emre Müzik	750,000 +
1995	Hasret Fenerleri	Emre Müzik	1,500,000 +
1996	Rüyam ve Sen	Tempa Foneks Müzik	750,000 +
1998	Yapamam Sensiz	Tempa Foneks Müzik	750,000 +
1999	Yolun Açık Olsun	Prestij/Orjin Müzik	800,000 +
2000	Sana Haksızlık Ettim	Prestij Müzik	950,000 +
2002	Su Damlası	Prestij Müzik	350,000 +
2004	Leyla	DMC	150,000 +
2006	ON	Seyhan Müzik	10,000 +
2009	Aşkın Adı	Suat Suna Music Production	100,000 +
2013	Senden Başka	Suat Suna Music Production	1.200,000 (sales number on fizy.com) +
2017	Seni Buldum	Seyhan Müzik	
2021	Aramızda Uçurumlar	Seyhan Müzik	
