= Byb Berlin =

Turkish composer

Belgin Ugursu, known by the stage name Byb Berlin (born 1987 in Istanbul), is the first loop artist of Turkey, as well as being a composer, producer, disk jockey, and audio-visual director.

== Career ==
Even though her musical career started with a band, she made a name for herself with her One Woman Orchestra Show Project, which was created after a long process of self-dedication to loop devices. She records all required sounds for the song live on stage, and creates the live cover by means of loop devices. Her show was of completely live covers of world known hits. Her name was known by larger audience when she was seen on famous TV shows Disko King as guest musician and Turkey Got Talent as semi-finalist contestant. Her talent took attention of many musicians as well as Gökhan Kırdar’s who is one of the first DJs of Turkey. Meanwhile, she took stage with him as guitarist, she performed her Byb Berlin show in many national and international festivals.

She won second prize with her "Perfect" song in Boss Loop Contest arranged by Roland in the USA in 2012 October.
