= Pınar Aydınlar =

Turkish singer and politician

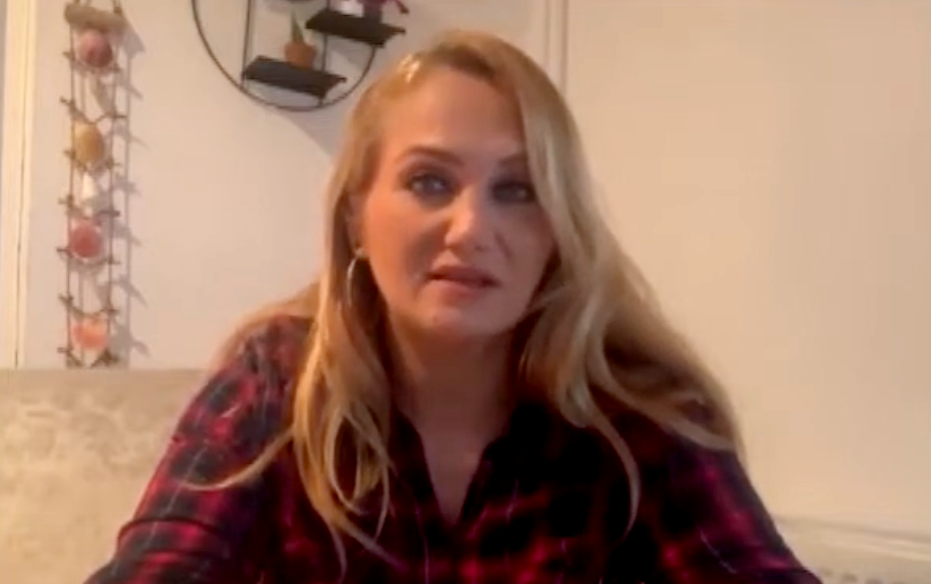
- Born: February 12, 1979 (age 47)
- Occupations: Folk music singer and politician
- Known for: Turkish and Kurdish folk music
- Political party: Halkların Demokratik Partisi

Pınar Aydınlar (born 12 February 1979 in Istanbul) is a Kurdish singer and politician. She has recorded several albums and also performed during the electoral campaigns of the HDP. In 2014, she was a mayoral candidate for Istanbul for the Peoples' Democratic Party (HDP).

== Musical career ==
She began to play the baglama when she was thirteen years of age. She graduated from the State Conservatory for Turkish Music of the Technical University of Istanbul in 1995. In 2003 Aydınlar released an album called Türkü Söylemek Lazım and two more in 2011.

== Political career ==
She is a well known supporter of the Peoples Democratic Party, being its Mayoral candidate together with Sirri Süreyya Önder in the local elections of March 2014 and also as a candidate for Izmir in the parliamentary elections 2015. She performed at the electoral campaign of the HDP in Ankara and is also a signatory of demand of release of the HDP politician and Human Rights Activist Ömer Faruk Gergerlioğlu.

=== Prosecution and imprisonment ===
She was arrested on the 15 May 2018 at the Atatürk Airport in Istanbul after she arrived from Germany. She was prosecuted for speeches she held during her electoral campaign to become a Member of the Grand National Assembly for Izmir and released after three and a half months. On the 17 March 2021, the State Prosecutor at the Court of Cassations Bekir Sahin demanded the closure of the HDP together with a political ban of five years for her and 686 other HDP politicians for alleged links with the Kurdistan Workers Party (PKK)

== Personal life ==
Aydınlar is married and has two children.
