= Leyla Pınar =

Turkish musician (1944–2021)

Leyla Pınar Tansever

Background information
- Born: Leyla Pınar; 1944; Istanbul, Turkey
- Origin: Istanbul, Turkey
- Died: 5 June 2021 (aged 76–77)
- Genres: Baroque Opera
- Instruments: Organ, piano, harpsichord
- Website: Istanbul Barok, @istanbul_barok

Leyla Pınar Tansever (1944 - 5 June 2021) was a Turkish harpsichordist and musicologist. She was the founder and artistic director of the Istanbul Barok ensemble and the International Istanbul Baroque Music Festival, which she founded in 1994. Pınar also taught in the Drama and Music Department of Yıldız Technical University in Istanbul.

== Istanbul Barok ==
Istanbul Barok is a musical ensemble founded by Leyla Pınar in 1975, initially as a harpsichord, violin, and flute trio. In 1995, she expanded the group to an international touring ensemble performing concerts, opera, and ballet featuring baroque music.

== Recordings ==
- Leyla Pinar: Clavecin. Label: Pavane ADW 7225
- Leyla Pinar: Yeni Bir Deyiş. Label: Night And Day
- Leyla Pinar & İstanbul Barok: Osmanlı Barok Müziği (Ottoman Baroque Music). Label: Kalan
