= Emel Sayın =

Turkish singer and actress

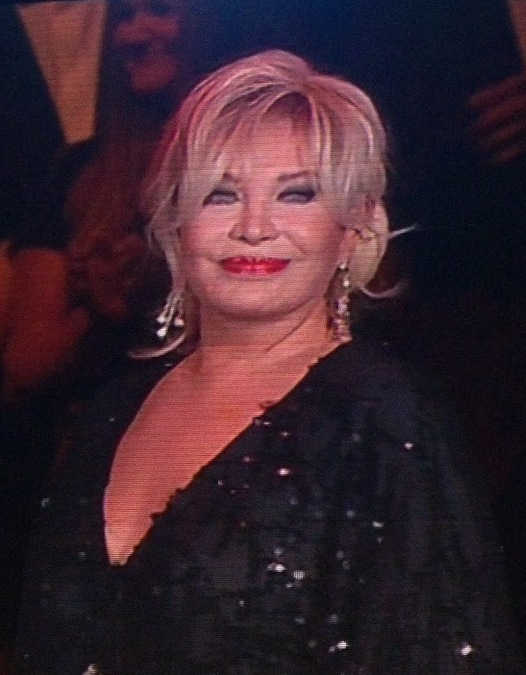
- Sayın in 2014

Background information
- Born: 20 November 1945 (age 80); Şarkışla, Sivas, Turkey
- Genre: Turkish music
- Occupations: Singer, actress
- Years active: 1962–present

Emel Sayın (born 20 November 1945) is a Turkish singer and actress.

== Life ==
She was born in Şarkışla district of Sivas Province on 20 November 1945, to a father who immigrated from Skopje, and a mother from Mardin. Her parents moved frequently and she had to attend primary and secondary schools in various cities such as Kayseri, Konya and Edirne. Finally she graduated from Teachers College of Çapa in Istanbul. However by then, she had already chosen a career in music. Her ex boyfriend Tarık Akan, she played in films Mavi Boncuk, Yalancı Yarim, Feryat.

Emel Sayın married three times. Her first marriage was to İsmet Kasapoğlu in 1966. The couple divorced in 1975, but remarried a year later. Their marriage ended in 1979. From June 1979 to September 1981, she was married to Selçuk Aslan. Her third and final husband was David Younnes, whom she married in 1986 and divorced in 1999.

== Music career ==
After serving three years in Istanbul Municipal Conservatory she got on the stage in 1962 in Ankara while she was only 17. Next year she became a singer of Turkish Radio and Television Corporation (TRT) for seven years. She then moved to İstanbul to sing in the music halls. She also created music albums. Her genre was Turkish classical music Later she began playing in the cinema and television films.

In 1998 she received the title state artist.

Before the Iranian Revolution (1978), she was present in Iranian cinema as an actress for a while, in addition to performing several live music. She also performed the famous song Gole Sangam with Ava Bahram during a joint concert in 2018 in Istanbul.

=== Discography ===
Albums

- 1970: Askin Kanunu
- 1971: Sus Sus Sus
- 1971: Gel Gel Gel
- 1971: Doyamadım Sana
- 1972: Son On Yılın En Sevilen On Şarkısı
- 1975: Emel Sayın 73
- 1975: Emel Sayın 74
- 1975: Emel Sayın 75
- 1975: Emel'in Dünyası
- 1976: Emel Sayın 76
- 1977: Emel Sayın (İran)
- 1978: Sensiz Olmuyor
- 1979: Rüzgar
- 1980: Emel'in Seçtikleri
- 1982: Bir Şarkıdır Yalnızlığım
- 1985: Sevgiler Yağsın
- 1986: Sevgisiz Yaşayamam
- 1988: Sevdalılar
- 1989: Kanımda Kıvılcım
- 1990: Üzüldüğün Şeye Bak
- 1991: İstanbul Şarkıları
- 1992: Gücendim Sana
- 1993: El Bebek Gül Bebek
- 1997: Başroldeyim
- 2000: Ah Bu Şarkılar
- 2000: Dinle 2001
- 2006: Emel Sayın Münir Nurettin Söylüyor

Singles

- 2009: "Haylazım"
- 2011: "Mavi Boncuk"
- 2013: "Hep Bana"

== Acting career ==
Sayın, who has appeared in various movies and TV series throughout her career, was given the "Lifetime Achievement Award" at the 53rd International Antalya Film Festival in 2016.

=== Filmography ===
==== Series ====
| Year | Title | Role | Notes |
|---|---|---|---|
| 2008 | Aşkım Aşkım | | The series was aired in 2001 and broadcast again in 2008. |
| 2008 | Avrupa Yakası | Guest appearance | |
| 2009 | Karınca Yuvası | | |

==== Films ====
| Year | Title | Role | Notes |
|---|---|---|---|
| 1970 | Şampiyon | Emel Sayın | |
| 1970 | Eyvah | | |
| 1971 | Makber | | |
| 1971 | Hicran | | |
| 1971 | Feride | Feride | |
| 1972 | Süreyya | Süreyya | |
| 1972 | Gülüzar | Pervin | |
| 1972 | Feryat | | |
| 1973 | Yalancı Yarim | Alev | |
| 1973 | Düşman | Helga | |
| 1974 | Mavi Boncuk | Emel Sayın | She also performed the main song for the movie's soundtrack. |
| 1974 | Hasret | Alev Sayın | |
| 1976 | Çam Sakızı | | |
| 1977 | Acı Hatıralar | Emel | |
| 1980 | Rüzgar | Emel | |
| 2007 | Beyaz Melek | Emel Sayın | |
| 2013 | Düğün Dernek | Cameo | |
