= Kemal Dinç =

Kemal Dinç (born 1970 in Istanbul) is a Turkish folk artist and music teacher.

== Life ==
Kemal Dinç was born in 1970 in Istanbul. His family is originally from Giresun. In 1980 he moved to stay with his family, who were workers in Germany. At age 11-12, he started to play bağlama and later learned playing classical guitar. After studying at Sulzbach Rosenberg Music Vocational High School, he completed his master's degree in 1997 at the Felix Mendelssohn Music-Theater University Classical Music Department in Leipzig. In 2006, he released his first album Lir ve Ateş. Dinç, who uses a crossed arrangement in bağlama, plays the instrument without a plectrum and uses tambur in his pieces as well. Kemal Dinç teaches at the Codarts and the University of Cologne.

== Albums ==
- Lir ve Ateş (2006)
- Bağlama İçin Denemeler (2012)
- Geleneksel Yorumlar (2015)
- Duo (2017) (with Ahmet Aslan)
