= Pinar Zorlutuna =

Turkish and American biomedical engineer

Pinar Zorlutuna is a Turkish and American biomedical engineer specializing in tissue engineering. She is the Roth-Gibson Professor of Bioengineering at the University of Notre Dame.

== Education and career ==
Zorlutuna has a bachelor's degree from Ankara University, and received a master's degree and Ph.D. through a joint program in biotechnology and bioengineering of the Middle East Technical University in Ankara and Queen Mary University of London in the UK, completed in 2009.

After postdoctoral research at the University of Illinois Urbana-Champaign and the Harvard–MIT Program in Health Sciences and Technology, she became an assistant professor of mechanical engineering at the University of Connecticut in 2012. She moved to the University of Notre Dame in 2014, and received the Roth-Gibson Professorship of Bioengineering in 2023.

== Recognition ==
Zorlutuna was a 2019 recipient of the Presidential Early Career Award for Scientists and Engineers. She was named to the College of Fellows of the American Institute for Medical and Biological Engineering in 2024, "for transformative advances in understanding the impact of aged tissue microenvironment on diseases and for realizing cell-based biocomputing architectures".
