= Yılmaz Morgül =

Turkish singer

- Born: İbrahim Yılmaz Morgül; 14 January 1964 (age 61); Beykoz, Turkey
- Genres: Classical Turkish
- Occupation: Singer
- Years active: 1995–present

İbrahim Yılmaz Morgül (born 14 January 1964) is a Turkish singer.

== Life ==
Morgül started his career by taking music lessons from Feriha Tunceli and Sözer Yaşmut and in 1988 started performing in Adana. His first album Elveda İstanbul was released in 1995.

In 1996, Morgül was diagnosed with skin cancer. He underwent 7 years of treatment in the USA. In 2016, he participated in Survivor despite his illness and under special conditions.

While appearing on a TV program, Morgül claimed that he was born in 1982. His age became a subject of much discussion in tabloid news until Turkish music artist Onur Akay published an old photograph of the two on his social media accounts, and it became clear that Morgül was in fact born in 1964.

In 2016, he participated in Survivor and joined the group of celebrities. In the same year, he joined the music competition program Rising Star Türkiye as a judge.

== Discography ==
- Elveda İstanbul (1995)
- Aşık Olmak İstiyorum & Unutama Beni (1996)
- Yılmaz Morgül II (1996)
- Masum Yalanlar (1997)
- Olduğum Gibiyim (2000)
- Türk Sanat Muziği Klasikleri (2001)
- Can Parçam (2003)
- Cennet (2005)
- Türk Sanat Müziği Klasikleri (2008)
- Yılmaz Morgül (2010)
- Yılmaz Morgül & Ayfer Er – Aşk Benden Sorulur (2013; Single)
- Yalnızlık Makamı (2015; EP)
- Yılmaz Morgül 2016 (2016; EP)
- Yılmaz Morgül Pop (2017; EP)
- Sensizlik Haram Bana (2019; single)
- Aşık Olmak İstiyorum (2021)
- Kal Benim Için (feat. Erkan Çelik) [Live Performance] (2021; single)
- Gülü Soldurmam (2021; single)
- Ummadığım Anda (2022; single)
- Karaağaç (2023; single)
- Karabiberim (2023; single)
- Canımsın (2024; single)
