= Nükleer Başlıklı Kız =

Turkish band

- Origin: Ankara, Turkey
- Genres: Alternative rock, indie rock, indie pop
- Years active: 2005 – 2016
- Labels: Favela Records
- Members: Billur Yapıcı; Tansel Turna

Nükleer Başlıklı Kız (NBK) is a Turkish band from Ankara. The name means "Nuclear Headed Girl" in Turkish, and is a clear allegory to Kırmızı Başlıklı Kız.

== Band history ==
Nükleer Başlıklı Kız was formed in Ankara in 2005. Since its formation, it has had one core member, vocalist Billur Yapıcı, who was joined by Tansel Turna in 2009. They reached the finals of the Nokia Supersound Contest in 2006 and won the Sony Ericsson Unistar Music Contest in 2007. They played regularly on stage with bass guitarist Cem Malak, keyboardist Tolga Büyük and drummer Kuzey Yılmaz until their disband in 2016 when Billur Yapıcı and Tansel Turna moved to London.
