= Ege Çubukçu =

Turkish rapper

- Born: Derya Ege Çubukçu; November 16, 1983 (age 42); İzmir, Turkey
- Genre: Hip hop
- Occupations: Rapper; singer; songwriter
- Years active: 2005–present

Ege Çubukçu (born 16 November 1983) is a Turkish rapper, singer and songwriter.

== Discography ==
- 2005: Bir Gün
- 2008: Bir De Baktım
- 2012: Parti İstanbul

=== Digital albums ===
- 2009: "Asit Yağmuru Remixler"
- 2010: "Sex On Da Beat"
- 2011: "Funky Sh*t"

=== All albums ===
- 2005: "Bir Gün"
- 2005: "Bir Gün" (2. Versiyon)
- 2013: "Yolumuz Ayrı"
- 2014: "Kanatlanıp Uçacaksın"
- 2012: "Parti İstanbul"
- 2016: "Reçete"
- 2017: "Gece Gelen Sıkıntı"
- 2018: "Derya"
- 2018: "Çalkala"

=== Other albums ===
- 2000: "Hayatını Yaşa"
- 2001: "Bi Yatakta Bi Ayakta"
- 2002: "KOH 001 – BOD 002"
- 2003: "Hashna Fishne"
- 2004: "Ağır Darbe – Beddua"
- 2005: "Alın Size Bandrol – Bürokrasiye Rağmen"
- 2006: "Nöbetteyim Gelicem"
