= Güler Duman '94 =

Studio album by Güler Duman
- Released: February 22, 1994
- Recorded: August–December 1993
- Studio: Studio PAN (Istanbul)
- Genre: Turkish folk music
- Length: 46:36
- Label: Duygu Music
- Producer: Sinan Çelik

Güler Duman chronology
Gül Yüzlü Sevdiğim (1992)	Güler Duman '94 (1994)	Bu Devran (1995)

Güler Duman '94 is the twelfth album by Turkish folk music singer Güler Duman, released on February 22, 1994, by Duygu Music. Widely regarded as one of the definitive albums of the 1990s, it became a massive commercial success, selling over 260,000 copies and establishing itself as the best-selling Turkish folk music album of the year. Recording for the album began in August 1993 and took four months to complete, wrapping up in December of the same year. Güler Duman contributed to the album's creative process by writing the lyrics for one track and composing the music for two others. In addition, she performed works by influential artists such as Hasret Gültekin, Pir Sultan Abdal, Mahzuni Şerif and Musa Eroğlu. The video clip of the track "Türkülerle Gömün Beni" was also released with the album and had a positive effect on the sales of the album. On May 1, 1994, she released her second video clip titled "Güle Yel Değdi" with lyrics and music by Hasret Gültekin.

Güler Duman '94 album, which greatly influenced Güler Duman's career, had a great impact on Turkish music. Güler Duman '94, which became one of the classic albums of folk music, achieved great success by selling more than 260 thousand copies and became the best-selling folk music album of the year. Güler Duman took her first step towards mastery with this album.

== Background ==
Güler Duman's albums Buldular Beni (1990), Duygu Pınarı (Vezrana) (1991) and Gül Yüzlü Sevdiğim (1992) which she released in the early 90s, were critically acclaimed. She also shot her first video clip for the track "Kara Tellerin" from her album Gül Yüzlü Sevdiğim. It was a significant success for the music market of the 90s. Güler Duman moved to Germany during the recording of the album due to her mother's illness. On July 2, 1993, due to the Sivas Massacre, in which artists such as Muhlis Akarsu, Metin Altıok, Nesimi Çimen, Edibe Sulari and Hasret Gültekin lost their lives, the recording of the album was postponed and she participated in commemoration concerts. She started recording the album in August 1993 and the recordings continued until the last month of the year. After four months of recording, she released her album Güler Duman '94 on February 22, 1994. In the music video of the track "Türkülerle Gömün Beni", Güler Duman included images of many minstrels, including Hasret Gültekin. Güler Duman worked with various artists in the album. Some of the songs on the album are still popular today. Güler Duman's song "Çalı Oldum Gülüm Yok", whose lyrics and music belong to her, has been reinterpreted by various interpreters.

The album made a good debut with the release of the video clip. With the release of the "Türkülerle Gömün Beni" video clip on radio and television, the album received positive reactions and its sales started to increase rapidly. With the album, she started to take the stage at concerts and festivals and sang the works included in the album. Two months after the album, on May 1, 1994, she released the video clip of the song "Güle Yel Değdi", lyrics and music by Hasret Gültekin, which she had performed in her album Rüzgarın Kanatlarında (1991). Like the first track, the second track received positive reactions. As the popularity of the album grew, the music videos were frequently broadcast on television channels during the day. The high sales of the album, which attracted young listeners at a time when Turkish pop music was booming, also attracted the attention of the mainstream media. Güler Duman, who became nationwide known as a guest on television programs, achieved a great success by selling 262 thousand copies at the peak of pop music. In addition to her consecutive concerts, she has had a very busy and successful period with magazine, TV and radio interviews. In 2012, he duetted with various artists such as Zara, Sevcan Orhan, Gülay, Orhan Ölmez and Zerrin Özer on the track "Türkülerle Gömün Beni" in his tribute album titled Yüreğimden Yüreğinize and included visuals of the master names and minstrels of Turkish folk music from past to present in the music video.

== Track listing ==
Güler Duman '94 – Standard edition
No.	Title	Writer(s)	Length
1.	"Güle Yel Değdi"	Hasret Gültekin	3:05
2.	"Şu Yalan Dünyaya"	Pir Sultan Abdal	3:41
3.	"Türkülerle Gömün Beni"	Derdiyok Ali	3:15
4.	"Arguvan"	Anonymous	5:00
5.	"Çarelerim"	Mahmut Erdal	3:33
6.	"Çalı Oldum Gülüm Yok"	Güler Duman	3:48
7.	"Ben Derdimi Kime Yanam"	Ozan Emekçi	3:40
8.	"Hasret Türküsü"	Hasret Gültekin	3:58
9.	"Bu İkilik Söyle Niye"	Tekin Karadağ	4:38
10.	"Tellal Başım"	Virani	4:10
11.	"Aramadı Sormadılar Ben"	Mahzuni Şerif	4:09
12.	"Pir Sultanım"	Pir Sultan Abdal	4:18
13.	"Ezgi Akşamı"	Instrumental	1:21
Total length:			46:36

- The track "Ezgi Akşamı" was only included in the cassette version. In the CD version, this track was replaced with "Ben Derdimi Kime Yanam". The track "Şu Yalan Dünyaya" was not included in the album released on digital platforms.

== Music video ==
- "Türkülerle Gömün Beni" (Published: 22 February 1994)
- "Güle Yel Değdi" (Published: 1 May 1994)

== Personnel ==
- Güler Duman: Vocal, bağlama ("Arguvan")
- Ceyhun Çelik: Keyboard
- Çetin Akdeniz: Bağlama
- Fatih Görgün: Kemane
- Deniz Selman: Mey, Zurna
- Sinan Çelik: Producer, music director, kaval
- Lyrics: Hasret Gültekin ("Güle Yel Değdi", "Hasret Türküsü"), Pir Sultan Abdal ("Şu Yalan Dünyaya", "Pir Sultanım"), Derdiyok Ali ("Türkülerle Gömün Beni"), Mahmut Erdal ("Çarelerim"), Güler Duman ("Çalı Oldum Gülüm Yok"), Ozan Emekçi ("Ben Derdimi Kime Yanam") Tekin Karadağ ("Bu İkilik Söyle Niye"), Virani ("Tellal Başım"), Mahzuni Şerif ("Aramad Sormadılar Beni")
- Music: Hasret Gültekin ("Güle Yel Değdi", "Hasret Türküsü"), Lütfü Gültekin ("Şu Yalan Dünyaya"), Derdiyok Ali ("Türkülerle Gömün Beni"), Mahmut Erdal ("Çarelerim"), Güler Duman ("Çalı Oldum Gülüm Yok", "Tellal Başım"), Ozan Emekçi ("Ben Derdimi Kime Yanam"), Tekin Karadağ ("Bu İkilik Söyle Niye"), Mahzuni Şerif ("Aramad Sormadılar Beni"), Musa Eroğlu ("Pir Sultanım"), Sinan Çelik ("Ezgi Akşamı")
- Ferdan Sayılı: Graphic
- Mehmet Günay: Masreting
- Fazil Atuk, İhsan Apça: Record
- Studio Celal: Photography
