= Kıvırcık Ali =

Turkish singer and composer (1968–2011)

- Born: Ali Özütemiz; 11 October 1968; Turhal, Tokat, Turkey
- Died: 11 January 2011 (aged 42) Büyükçekmece, Istanbul, Turkey
- Genre: Turkish folk music
- Occupations: Singer, composer
- Instruments: Bağlama, vocals
- Years active: 1996–2011
- Label: İber Müzik

Ali Özütemiz (11 October 1968 – 11 January 2011), better known by his stage name Kıvırcık Ali, was a Turkish composer, musician and singer.

Özütemiz was born as the youngest of nine siblings into a Turkmen Alevi family in the village of Erenli, in the Turhal district of Tokat Province. While working as a farmer and shepherd during his childhood, he also learned to play the bağlama from villagers and played at weddings and cemevis. After completing primary school, Özütemiz did not continue his education. In 1983, with the support of his elder brother, he came to Istanbul, where he played the bağlama at venues such as wedding halls. During this period, he also recorded three albums that he was unable to release commercially, some of whose songs would be released after his death. He acquired the nickname "Kıvırcık" here because of his curly hair.

In 1995, he founded Grup Turnalar with two friends. In 1998, Özütemiz's first solo album, Gül Tükendi, Ben Tükendim, was released. He achieved commercial success with the 2000 album Isırgan Otu and the 2004 album Üçüncü Gurbet. In 2003, the album Düet, a collaboration with Arzu Şahin, was released, while Geriye Dönün Seneler and Hepimize Yeter Dünya were released in 2006 and 2008, respectively.

The artist died at the age of 42 on 11 January 2011 in Büyükçekmece, Istanbul, in a traffic accident while driving his own vehicle. Following his death, the studio album Onbir Bir İkibinonbir / Veda was released that same year and achieved commercial success. Compilation albums titled Hasret and Sevdiklerim were released in 2014 and 2017, respectively.

== Early years ==
Özütemiz was born on 11 October 1968 in the village of Erenli, in the Turhal district of Tokat, into an Alevi-Turkmen family as the youngest of nine siblings. His mother's name was Gülbahar and his father's name was Ali. His father, a folk poet known as "Âşık Ali", died in a tractor accident 37 days before Özütemiz was born. During his childhood, he worked as a shepherd and farmer. He learned to play the bağlama from village poet Mahmut Kaya, village dede Sadık Körpeci, and primary school teacher Fevzi Küpeli. He subsequently began playing the bağlama at weddings and cemevis. He did not continue his education after completing primary school.

Thanks to his elder brother, he came to Istanbul in 1983 and began working at the Güngör Saz Evi and Yapım Atölyesi in Kasımpaşa. During this period, he won first place in the aşık-style category of a singing competition organized by Bahar Plak. He received three months of solfège training in Istanbul, but left after he was unable to pay the fees. He then worked in garment workshops and played the bağlama at venues such as nightclubs and wedding halls. It was during this period that he acquired the nickname "Kıvırcık" because of his curly hair. He completed his military service between 1990 and 1991. Between 1994 and 1998, he produced three albums consisting of his own compositions but was unable to release them commercially. Some of the songs from these albums were included on a compilation album after his death.

He also described Musa Eroğlu, Güler Duman, and Edip Akbayram as "guides and spiritual supporters" during the early stages of his musical career.

== Career ==
When banderole figures come before the owners of major companies, everyone sees the name Kıvırcık Ali at the very top, but no one knows anything about him. His name is known, but he himself is not. After Tarkan, he is the person whose works are pirated the most. He has a strange audience; his popularity is incredible, and both right-wingers and left-wingers listen to him.

— Hasan Saltık, founder of Kalan Müzik

=== 1995–1998: Grup Turnalar ===
Özütemiz founded Grup Turnalar with İbrahim Akkaya and Mustafa Yılmaz in 1995, and they released their first album, Türkülerden Türkülere Yol Eyledik, in 1996 under the Devsan Kasetçilik label. On the album, they performed works such as "Bu Yıl Benim Yeşil Bağım Kurudu", "Ordu'nun Dereleri", and "Güzelliğin On Para Etmez". Çiğdem Çiftçi joined the group in 1997. The album Türküler Kimliğimiz was subsequently released in 1998. It consisted primarily of traditional works.

=== 1998–2002: Gül Tükendi Ben Tükendim and Isırgan Otu ===
In 1998, Özütemiz's first solo album, Gül Tükendi, Ben Tükendim, was released under the İber Müzik label. The album Isırgan Otu, released on 8 November 2000, sold 120,000 copies and became the 21st best-selling domestic album in Turkey in 2001. In 2001, he sang the song "Mehmet Ali Ağıdı" together with Mustafa Özarslan on the Salkım Söğüt 3 album by Hilmi Yarayıcı and Mustafa Özarslan. That same year, he composed "Yaşamdan Ölüme" for Edip Akbayram's Selam Olsun album and "Cemrem" for Sibel Can's Canım Benim album. For Arzu Şahin's Ayrılık album, released on 6 September 2002, he composed the song "Ayrılık", with lyrics by Erdoğan Alkan. He performed the song "Nereden Bileceksiniz" on the 2002 tribute album Dinle Sevgili Ülkem, released after Ahmet Kaya's death.

=== 2003–2005: Düet, Üçüncü Gurbet and Türkülerle Döndük ===
On 28 May 2003, the album Düet with Arzu Şahin was released under the İber Müzik label. Üçüncü Gurbet, released under the İber Müzik label on 9 April 2004, sold 160,000 copies that year, making it the second best-selling domestic album in the folk music category in Turkey in 2004 and the 41st best-selling domestic album overall. He composed the song "Oğul" on Ferhat Tunç's 2005 album Sevmek Bir Eylemdir and performed it together with Tunç.

Mesut Çiftçi and Binali İlgün joined Grup Turnalar's existing members Ali Özütemiz, İbrahim Akkaya, and Çiğdem Çiftçi, and their third album, Türkülerle Döndük, was released under the İber Müzik label on 7 June 2005. The album consisted primarily of anonymous folk songs, while the group itself handled the arrangements and album production. They also performed the folk song "Zeytin Yaprağı Yeşil" on İber Müzik's Şeyda Türküler 1, released that same year.

=== 2006: Geriye Dönün Seneler ===
On 3 March 2006, Geriye Dönün Seneler was released under the İber Müzik label. Songwriters including Yusuf Hayaloğlu, Mahmut Erdal, and Dursun Ali Akınet contributed to the album. It also included works by Nesîmî ("Yar Ali Yar"), Pir Sultan Abdal ("Görmeye Geldim"), Amasyalı Fedai Baba ("Ayrılık"), and Aşık Maksut Feryadi ("Gününe Düştüm"). Özütemiz composed all of the songs on the album except "Yar Ali Yar", which was composed by Ozan Emekçi. In addition to Özütemiz, Erdal Erzincan and Erol Parlak contributed bağlama performances. Özütemiz explained the meaning of the album's title as follows: "We now tell, with laughter and smiles, about those periods that we went through with so much hardship, hunger and thirst. That's why I called it 'Geriye Dönün Seneler'."

The album sold 67,000 copies in 2006 and became the 45th best-selling domestic album in Turkey that year.

=== 2008–2009: Hepimize Yeter Dünya ===
On 15 July 2008, Hepimize Yeter Dünya was released under the İber Müzik label. The album became the 62nd domestic album in Turkey to receive the most banderoles, with 24,000 units. In 2009, he performed a song on Aydın Öztürk Bestelerini Söylediler 2. That same year, he performed the song "Yar Gözlerin Yemyeşil" together with Kayran on Berrin Kayran's album Bir Varmışsın, Bir Yokmuşsun.

== Personal life ==
Özütemiz married Şadıman Baş in 1988, and they had two children from this marriage. After divorcing Şadıman Baş, he married Aslı Güven on 22 January 2010.

== Musical style ==
Özütemiz was criticized for arabesquizing Alevi culture. The artist, however, said that he liked singing folk songs loudly and that his style was formed from a combination of Anadolu and Alevi culture:

We have many brave folk poets, doyens, and masters who have carried our culture to the present day. They brought out what they had compiled from traditional folk songs. I sing my own compositions; I have my own style. I truly draw my water from Anatolia, and I kneaded my dough in Alevi culture. But I have created my own style. One day I said to my masters, 'Why are you being so cruel? After singing like you, what need is there for me?' I don't sing traditionally in order to spoil it; I sing my own folk songs, or rather, they'll get angry now, my compositions in folk-song form. Why is it arabesque? Can't folk songs be sung loudly? I sing as I feel and as I live; I like singing loudly more, and I have the voice for it. If they call my singing with pain and my use of long notes arabesque, that's their opinion. I sing with pain because there is pain in my voice and fire in my throat. If you look very closely into my eyes, you can see the pain.

— 9 July 2006 issue of the Cumhuriyet newspaper, page 7

Özütemiz said that Muhlis Akarsu, Abdullah Papur, Ali Kızıltuğ, Ali Ekber Çiçek, Musa Eroğlu, Arif Sağ, Sabahat Akkiraz, Rıza Aslandoğan, Ali Çınar, and Mehmet Çınar were the artists who influenced him during his youth. He also stated that he was a "fanatical admirer" of Ahmet Kaya.

== Death and aftermath ==
On 11 January 2011, Özütemiz left his home for Atatürk Airport to travel to Ankara for a television program to be broadcast on TRT 1. He died at around 05:30 Turkey time in a traffic accident involving his own vehicle on the road known as the "death bend" in Tepecik, Büyükçekmece. He was buried at Gülbahçe Cemetery in Hadımköy, Istanbul. In a damages lawsuit filed by his family against the General Directorate of Highways, the General Directorate of Highways was found responsible and ordered to pay a fine of TL 294,000.

After his death, a park in the Osman Temiz Neighborhood of Çankaya, Ankara was named after the artist. Şişli municipality organized a competition for a memorial tomb for Özütemiz's grave in Hadımköy, with artists such as Mehmet Aksoy, Arif Sağ, and Emre Saltık serving as jury members. The then Prime Minister of Turkey Recep Tayyip Erdoğan issued a message of condolence, and Republican People's Party chairman Kemal Kılıçdaroğlu visited the artist's relatives to offer condolences. Turkish folk music artist Ali Kızıltuğ also wrote a lament for Özütemiz's death.

The studio album Onbir Bir İkibinonbir / Veda, released after his death on 16 March 2011, sold 60,000 copies that year and became the eighth best-selling domestic album in Turkey. Yıldız Tilbe appeared on the album's song "Al Ömrümü", while the album's closing song, "Kimim Kaldı", was composed and performed by his son Eren Özütemiz.

Kıvırcık Ali's song "Ben Melanet Hırkasını" was included on Kalan Müzik's compilation album Aleviler'e Kalan II, released on 30 May 2014.

On 17 September 2014, the compilation album Hasret, consisting of unreleased recordings, was released under the İber Müzik label. The album included songs recorded before Gül Tükendi, Ben Tükendim that had not been released, as well as tracks recorded as backups during the studio albums but not included on them. While the vocals were retained as originally recorded, the music was re-recorded. The album included works with lyrics by artists such as Aşık Hüdai, Aydın Öztürk, Dursun Ali Akınet, Mahmut Erdal, Maksut Koca, and Yusuf Hayaloğlu. The video for the album's song "Sen Yalan mıydın" was made from excerpts of Caner Erzincan's film Mar. The album sold 11,985 copies in 2014 and became the 37th best-selling domestic album in Turkey that year.

On 12 June 2017, his second compilation album, Sevdiklerim, was released under the İber Müzik label. Compiled from live recordings performed with Özütemiz's orchestra, the album included two songs by Ahmet Kaya and Sezen Aksu's "Belalım".

On 26 November 2018, the first album by his son Eren Özütemiz, Senden Kalan, which also included compositions by Kıvırcık Ali, was released under the İber Müzik label.

On 13 January 2025, on the 14th anniversary of his death, Kartal Municipality organized a memorial evening at the Bülent Ecevit Cultural Center. İntizar, Latif Doğan, and many other artists performed Özütemiz's works.

== Discography ==
=== Studio albums ===
- 1998: Gül Tükendi, Ben Tükendim
- 2000: Isırgan Otu
- 2003: Düet (collaborative album with Arzu Şahin)
- 2004: Üçüncü Gurbet
- 2006: Geriye Dönün Seneler
- 2008: Hepimize Yeter Dünya
- 2011: Onbir Bir İkibinonbir / Veda

=== Compilation albums ===
- 2014: Hasret
- 2017: Sevdiklerim

== Television programs ==
- Bir Çift Turna (Flash TV, with Arzu Şahin)
- Gönüller Bir Olsun (Kral TV, with Yusuf Hayaloğlu and later with Cansu Koç)

== Awards and nominations ==
Year	Award	Category	Work	Result	Source
2002	8th Kral TV Video Music Awards	Best Male Turkish Folk Music Artist	"Isırgan Otu"	Nominated	
2005	11th Kral TV Video Music Awards	THM Male	"Üçüncü Gurbet"	Nominated	
2007	13th Kral TV Video Music Awards	THM Male	"Canımın İçi"	Nominated	
2012	18th Kral Music Awards	Special Award		Won	
