= Güler Duman =

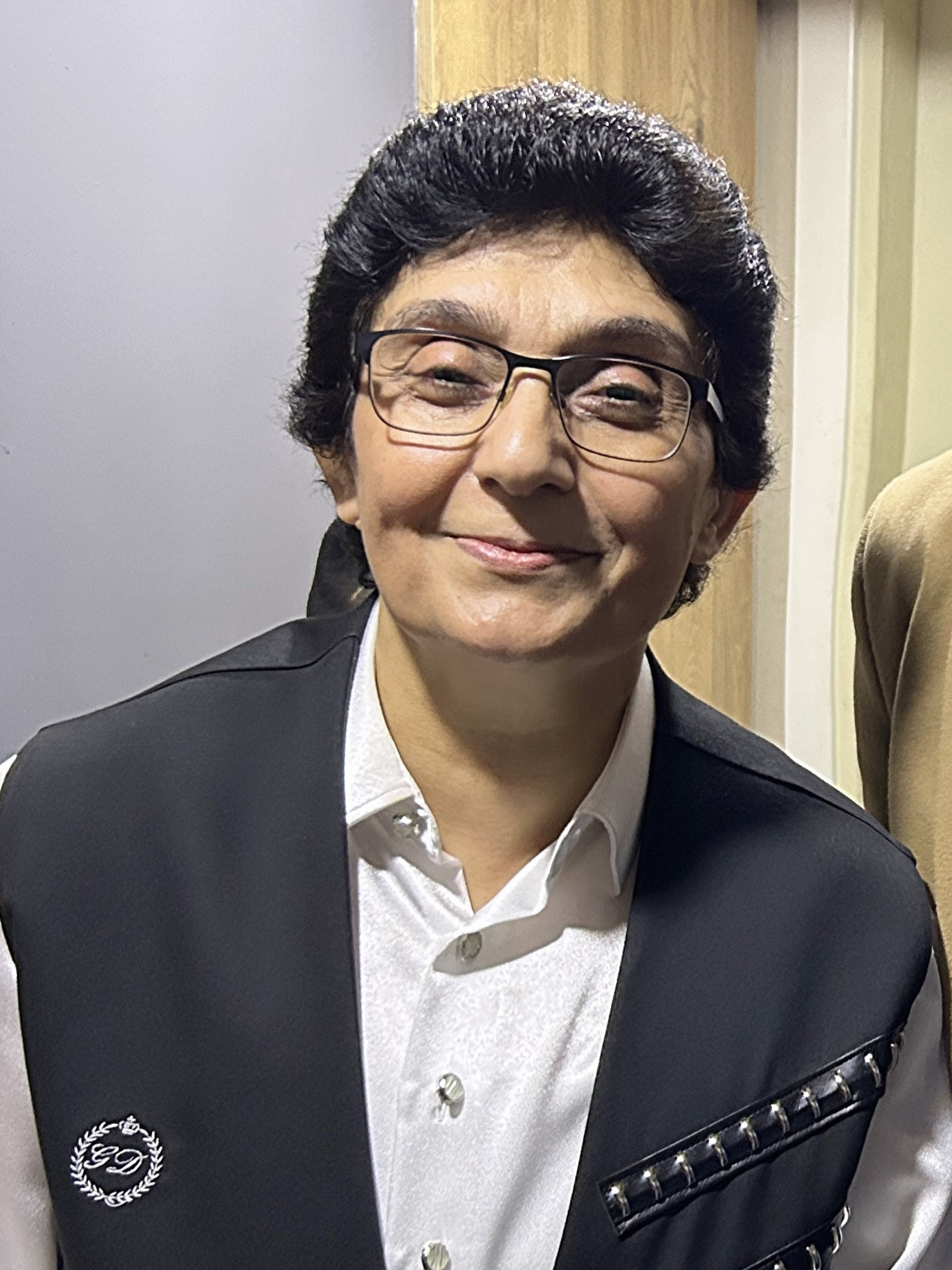
- Born: 30 June 1967 (age 59); Istanbul, Turkey
- Occupations: Singer; songwriter; composer; TV server; Music teacher
- Years active: 1980–present
- Title: "Sultan of Türküs"
- Musical career
- Genre: Turkish folk music
- Instruments: Vocals; bağlama
- Labels: Özlem Plak; Diyar Müzik; Duygu Müzik; Özdemir Müzik
- Website: gulerduman.com.tr

Güler Duman (born 30 June 1967) is a Turkish singer, songwriter, composer, TV host and music teacher. She concentrates on Turkish folk music.

She has become one of the legendary artists of Turkish folk music with the albums she has released since the early 1980s. Originally from Erzurum, Güler Duman took part as the youngest person in the choir established by Ruhi Su while she was in primary school. Discovering the voice of the artist in the choir, Mustafa Budan made a name for himself in the art world with his voice in the movie A Season in Hakkari (1982), directed by Erden Kıral and starring Genco Erkal. She made her first album with Dost Garip in 1980 when she was a child. This album made a huge sale, reaching 1 million 800 thousand sales. In 1987, she entered Istanbul Technical University Turkish Music State Conservatory, vocal education department.

He graduated in 1992 with his thesis on the interpretation that eight poets, who wrote under the pseudonym Pir Sultan Abdal, used the same pseudonym as his graduation thesis. This thesis was published as a book in 2004. The artist, who was chosen as the cultural ambassador by the German Ministry of Culture in 2008, gives seminars on Turkish folk music and Turkish rhythms and world rhythms he is researching in many countries of the world, especially in Germany, and shares his knowledge with music lovers. He has taught more than 11,700 students and pioneered Germany and many European countries in this regard.

Güler Duman O Leyli Leyli (1982), Nazlı Yara Küskünüm (1987), Güler Duman '94 (1994), Bu Devran (1995), Öl Deseydin Ölmez miydim? (1997), Türküsü Dile Geldi (2009) and Yüreğimden Yüreğinize (2012). Güler Duman, who wrote her own lyrics and composed her own compositions, became one of the best-selling names in Turkish folk music with close to 10 million album sales in Turkey and Europe. She is one of the best female Turkish folk music artists in Turkey.

== Early life and career ==
=== 1967–1985: Early years and career start ===
Güler Duman's father, Fevzi Duman, immigrated to Istanbul with his wife Hanım in 1963, without any children. Güler Duman was born on 30 June 1967 in Istanbul. Originally from Erzurum, Aşkale. While his father was in Aşkale, he first learned to play the kaval and then the baglama by himself. When he immigrated to Istanbul, he continued to play baglama whenever he could find time. Güler Duman started to put together the works performed by her four-year-old father. His father bought a baglama for Güler Duman at a young age. Duman started to play and sing Turkish folk music pieces at a young age. She started primary school education in the early 1970s. While going to primary school, she entered the choir opened by Ruhi Su and was the youngest person in the choir. She continued to put a lot of work on her education here and started playing baglama at an advanced age when she was a child. Working by constantly listening to Turkish folk music works on radio, television and albums, Güler Duman also engaged in music while continuing her education. She had the chance to meet the masters of Turkish folk music who came to visit the choir she took part in when she was in secondary school. In addition to playing baglama, she received great acclaim because of her very strong voice. Although she was still in secondary school during this period, she released her album Dost Garip (1980). The album suddenly attracted great attention and reached a high sales figure. In 1982, she made a name for herself in the art world with the work she voiced in the movie titled A Season in Hakkari, directed by Erden Kıral and starring Genco Erkal. With the film, the sales of her first album exploded and the album reached a sales figure of 3.8 million.

She released the album O Leyli Leyli in 1982 and started to compose with this album. She graduated from high school in 1984 and at the end of the same year she released her album Seher Yeli. Featuring songs by artists such as Nesimi Çimen, Neşet Ertaş, İhsan Öztürk, Nadir Şener and Yüksel Yıldız the album became one of the best-selling albums of the period with a sales figure of one million. She left the school in 1985 as a result of cadaver experiments from the dentistry department she won. On 6 November 1985, she released her fourth album under the name Mevlayı Seversen.

=== 1986–1993: Conservatory and recognition ===
She left Istanbul Technical University Dentistry Department in 1985 and won the ITU Turkish Music State Conservatory department a year later. Due to his education, he did not release an album for about two years. In 1987, he released his fifth album, Misafir Geldim. Due to her education, she did not release an album for two years. In 1987, she signed with Duygu Müzik and released her fifth album, called Misafir Geldim. She composed two songs herself in the album, which includes the works of many artists. At the end of the same year, the project named Dört Dilden Dört Telden took part in the album together with Sevgi Kaya, Necla Yener and Gülizar Akkuş. In 1987, she released her sixth album, named Nazlı Yara Küskünüm, with the Diyar Müzik label. This album became one of the most successful albums of her career. In 1988, she released her albums called Kulluk Benim Olsun Sultanlık Senin and Ya Dost. The songs she sang in her albums were very popular. At the end of the 1980s, she began to be a guest on television and radio programs. While continuing to produce in 1989, she was also receiving conservatory education. While continuing to produce in 1989, he was also receiving conservatory education. He continued to give concerts and participate in festivals in Turkey as well as in Europe. The recordings of the folk concerts she gave in 1988–89 with Gül Sorgun, Sabahat Akkiraz, Gülcihan Koç, Mutlu Güler and Deste Günaydın were released on 15 January 1990, as an album called Büyük Halk Konseri / Deyişlerimizle Merhaba. In the first month of 1990, she released her ninth album called Buldular Beni.

At the end of 1990, he released his first project album, Sazımızla Sözümüzle. She released the first album of the series with Zafer Gündoğdu on 18 December 1990, under the name of Sazımızla Sözümüzle 1. This album series continued to be published with a different consistency in the following years by Güler Duman. It entered a very busy period in the early 1990s. In the summer of 1991, he released his tenth album, called Gül Yüzlü Sevdiğim. "Kara Tellerin", which is a traditional Azerbaijani music in this album, was released as a video clip from the album. In addition, this video clip is the first music video released by Güler Duman. She graduated from the conservatory in the summer of 1992. As his graduation thesis, he wrote the thesis, which was written under the pseudonym Pir Sultan Abdal and explained that eight poets used the same pseudonym. (This thesis was published as a book in 2004.) Her thesis advisors are Neriman Tüfekçi and Yücel Paşmakçı. After graduating from the conservatory, she accelerated her album recordings and released her album, called Duygu Pınarı (Vezrana), on 3 September 1992. Right after that, she released her eleventh album called Dost Dost Diye (1993), which included eleven tracks, in the spring. Güler Duman, who wanted to join the TRT artists during this period, had to settle first in the United States and then in Germany due to her mother's serious illness. Güler Duman, who had to settle in Germany due to the long treatment process, took a break from her career for a while after the sudden death of her mother. During this period, she opened a music school in Germany and started to give music education to children and young people.

=== 1994–2001: Güler Duman '94, Bu Devran ve Öl Deseydin Ölmez miydim? ===
She started recording her second studio album in August 1993. She released her thirteenth album under the name Güler Duman '94 on 22 February 1994.The song "Türkülerle Gömün Beni", whose lyrics and music belongs to Derdiyok Ali, was first released from the album. After the release of this song, album sales exploded and Güler Duman became known as a country-based. The album, which achieved a good output, was highly appreciated. After the album, the song "Güle Yel Değdi" was released and, like the previous song, it managed to get positive reactions. Two songs by Hasret Gültekin, who was a close friend of Güler Duman and died in the Sivas Massacre about seven months before the album was released, were included in the album. With this album, Güler Duman started to write lyrics and included the song "Çalı Oldum Gülüm Yok", whose music and lyrics belonged to her, in the album. In addition, the album, which became a classic with songs such as "Şu Yalan Dünyaya", "Çarelerim" and "Hasret Türküsü", became one of the most important Turkish folk music albums of the 1990s and of all times. The album became one of the best sellers of the year by selling more than 265,000, and with this album, Güler Duman took the first step towards mastery. She released her album Bu Devran on 15 September 1995. Shortly after the album's release, the song "Bu Devran", whose lyrics and music belongs to Bilal Ercan, was released.

The piece was highly appreciated and tracks such as "Kul Gibi", "Bugün Ben Şahımı Gördüm", "Erzurum Dağları" and "Her An Özlüyorum" became the highlights of the album and made a great contribution to the album. The album was highly appreciated and sold more than 300 thousand, making it one of the best selling Turkish folk music albums of the year. During this period, she was a guest on many radio and television channels. She was nominated for the Best Turkish Folk Music Female Artist of the year at the Kral TV Video Music Awards to be held for the second time on 21 March 1996, and won the award. Güler Duman could not attend the award ceremony due to her illness and İbrahim Tatlıses received her award on her behalf. After this album, she took a short break due to her illness. He began recording his fifteenth studio album in mid-1997. The recording of the album, which includes works by artists such as Neşet Ertaş, Hasan Karakuş, Rıza Ergin, Erkan Yoksuli, Rıza Ergin, Gülizar Ergin and Ahmet Çelik, took about five months. Öl Deseydin Ölmez miydim? The album was released on 22 October 1997. The album, which attracted great attention with the songs in the album, became one of the classics. It is the last album released by Güler Duman in the 1990s and is known as one of the best selling albums of Turkish folk music. The music of the three songs in the album belongs to Güler Duman. In the first months of 1998, Ozanlar Diyarı released a compilation album. In the summer of the same year, he released an album called Nostalji 1, which includes the songs he sang in the 80s. At the end of 2000, he released Nostalji 2, the second and last album of the series. At the end of 2001, she transferred the task to her assistants in the course where she taught music.

=== 2002–2011: Yolcuyum Bu Dağlarda, Türküler Dile Geldi, duet and project albums ===
Güler Duman became one of the most successful names of Turkish folk music by producing great works and frequently talked about in the 1990s. On 13 June 2002, she released her album, named Yolcuyum Bu Dağlarda. He entered the studio after a break of fourteen years for the second album of the series, which was first published in 1990. She released the album with Musa Eroğlu. In the album, which includes 12 tracks, only a video clip for the track "Niye Böyle Dargın Bakarsın" was released. The album had a very good debut and was highly appreciated. The songs released from the album became one of the most popular folk music tracks of the year. Most of the arrangements in the album were made by Güler Duman and Musa Eroğlu. After the release of your project, which was published under the label of Duygu Music, Musa Eroğlu and Güler Duman often gave concerts together and were guests on television programs. Fifteen years after the release of the album, the duo organized a concert series with the Yediveren Orchestra called Sazımızla Sözümüzle (2019-2022). In the same year, she sang the song "Şu Yalan Dünyaya" in the compilation album Pir Sultan Abdal Dostları, which included many artists.

In 2006, she released the album Yolarına Kar Mı Yağdı (Sazımızla Sözümüzle 3), the last album of the Sazımızla Sözümüzle series. From the album she released with Özlem Özdil, "Yollarına Kar Mı Yağdı" released the song as a video clip. During this period, she prepared and presented a television program called Güler Duman'la Telden Dile (2006) with Güler Duman on Kanal Avrupa. She sang the long air called "Yastadır Ey Deli Gönül" in the movie The White Angel (2007), written and directed by Mahsun Kırmızıgül. She sang a duet on the track "Yarsız Çekilmiyor" in Yusuf Gül's album titled Türkülerimiz Var Bizim..., which was released on 24 December 2008, and the track became one of the most admired works of the period. In 2009, she released the album Türküler Dile Geldi and shot three music videos from the album. With this album, she signed with Özdmir Müzik Company.

=== 2012–present: Yüreğimden Yüreğinize, Yüreğimden Yüreğinize Sazım ve other works ===
Güler Duman wanted to make an album specifically for the thirtieth year of her career. He entered the studio for this special album in the spring of 2011. Album recordings took about seven and a half months. The thirty-track album consisted of a double disc. On 19 January 2012, the album's first disc, which was released under the name of Yüreğimden Yüreğinize (Sesime Ses Katanlara Selam Olsun), included the songs she sang throughout her career. He performed a duet with an artist on each track on the first disc. From the album, he first released the classic song "Türkülerle Gömün Beni". The song was accompanied by artists such as Zara, Orhan Ölmez, Sevcan Orhan and Kubat, and images of Turkish folk music artists and great bards from past to present were featured in the clip of the piece. The second disc of the album contained new tracks.It became one of the important albums of Turkish folk music released in the 2010s. Three songs from the album were released as clips. In the first half of the 2010s, she took part in various projects and adaptation albums.

== Private life ==
Güler Duman settled in Germany in 1993 due to her mother's illness and started living there. Güler Duman, who established her order in the country, is in constant contact with Turkey. In October 1995, Güler Duman International Music School established a music school in Germany. She started to manage the music school and started to give lessons at the music school. People from all over the world attended the course. Güler Duman has had nearly five thousand students so far. In addition to Turkish folk music lessons, baglama and various saz lessons are also given. Güler Duman was diagnosed with cardiovascular disease at a young age. When she gets sick, she goes to the doctor 4–5 days a week. She later recovered from her illness.
