= Belkıs Akkale =

Turkish folk music singer (born 1952)

- Also known as: Türkü Bacı
- Born: 17 May 1954 (age 71); Istanbul, Turkey
- Genres: Turkish folk
- Occupation(s): Singer, songwriter, composer
- Instrument: Bağlama
- Years active: 1972–present
- Labels: Güvercin Müzik; Dokuz Sekiz Müzik

Belkıs Akkale (born 17 May 1954) is a Turkish folk music singer.

== Discography ==
=== 45rpms ===
- Seni Allah Verdi Kimse Alamaz / Aşk Mahkumu (Altunç-1972)
- Boş Beşik / Gözüm Kapıda Kaldı (Ümit-1973)
- İnsan Sevdiğine Kardeş Mi Der / Kızılırmak (Ümit-1974)
- Sevdiğime Pişman Oldum / Gizli Bir Aşk (Mevsim-1974)
- Sahte Sevda / Zorla Güzellik Olmaz (Harman-19xx)
- Füsun / Güzel Sana Güle Güle (Harman-19xx)
- Bir Kadeh Susuz Rakı / Meyhaneler Oldu Benim En Son Durağım (Füsun-19xx)

=== Albums ===
- 1977 Kaldır Nikabını (Özaydın)
- 1978 Gam Elinden (Kervan)
- 1980 Dostlara Selam (Yağmur)
- 1982 Dadey (Yağmur)
- 1983 Sağolun (Yağmur)
- 1984 Türkü Türkü Türkiyem 1 (Sembol)
- 1985 Türkü Türkü Türkiyem 2 (Sembol)
- 1986 Güvercinim (Midas)
- 1988 Nerdesin (Midas)
- 1989 Gönül Telinden-1 (Midas)
- 1991 91'e Merhaba (Midas)
- 1991 Türküler Bizden Dinlemek Sizden with Hülya Süer and Güler Duman (Bonus)
- 1992 Ayrılığı Türkülere Sor/Yemen Yolu (Güvercin)
- 1992 Kaynana / Vay Bana (Raks)
- 1992 Ezgi Şöleni 2 with İzzet Altınmeşe (Ulus Müzik)
- 1993 Seher Bülbülü (Dünya)
- 1994 Ezgi Şöleni with İzzet Altınmeşe (Ulus Müzik)
- 1994 Ben de Yoruldum (Ulus Müzik)
- 1994 Geri Gelmiyor / Al Yanaklım (ASM)
- 1996 Seher Yıldızı with Arif Sağ (Güvercin)
- 1999 Barış Türküsü (Güvercin)
- 2000 Özlenenler, Vol. 1 (A1 Müzik)
- 2009 Nağmeger / Kaldır Mihrabını (Anadolu)
- 2014 Türküler Bizi Anlatır - 1 / Teberik (Buz)

== Filmography ==
Film	Year	Role
Kara Diken	1986	Nazo
Güvercinim	1986	Elif
Gelin Oy	1986	Hatice
Tırpan	1987	Ayşe Bacı
Tapulu Irgat	1987	
Sultan	1987	Sultan
Gölet	1987	
Azap	1987	
Ana Yüreği	1987	Fatma
