= Müslüm Durgun =

PKK commander

Dr. Baran
- Born: Müslüm Durgun; 1951; Güdeç, Tunceli
- Died: 12 March 1993 (aged 41–42)
- Military career
- Allegiance: Kurdistan Workers' Party
- Known for: Commanding the Başbağlar massacre
- Conflicts: Kurdistan Workers' Party insurgency Israel-PKK conflict

Müslüm Durgun, (1951-1993 or 1994) better known by the nom de guerre, Dr. Baran, was a commander in the Kurdistan Workers' Party (PKK) and the head of PKK operations in Tunceli province during the 1990s. He was known for organizing the Başbağlar massacre in 1993, and disappeared shortly after.

== Biography ==
According to state registries, Müslüm Durgun was from Güdeç, Tunceli, born around 1951 to Ahmet and Beser Durgun. He was part of the ARGK, the PKK armed wing. As a native of Tunceli, of Zaza origin and Alevi faith, he was influential in his community and was quickly promoted to commander. He first came in contact with the PKK while working in Libya, and later travelled to Lebanon to train in the PKK camps. He was always interested in medicine, and had caught tuberculosis in Lebanon, which he cured by himself. He was then trained as a medic with the PKK, and wrote all his knowledge in a medical brochure which he distributed to new recruits, earning the nickname Dr. Baran. He rose through the ranks, becoming a commander in the 1990s. At the time, he was the only Alevi commander in the PKK, and his strongest support base was in Tunceli. He held the son of Veli Yeşil (head of the DYP in Tunceli) during his circumcision ceremony. Dr. Baran was involved in the Israel-PKK conflict, and claimed to have visited Palestine along with a TDKP delegation, although he had a tense relationship with Turkish leftists and was criticized by the TDKP. In one instance in 1992, he "recklessly" led his troops from the mountainside into the center of Ovacık in daylight, seen as an example PKK overconfidence at that time.

Dr. Baran was infamous for organizing the Başbağlar massacre in July 1993, in retaliation for the Sivas massacre. His fate after the massacre was unknown, with some claiming he committed suicide, and others suspecting that the PKK leadership killed him for leading the "unplanned, stubborn action" which was not in PKK interests. Abdullah Öcalan claimed that Dr. Baran orchestrated the massacre without having informed him. He reportedly targeted Başbağlar for being a Sunni village, and for voting for the MHP. Dr. Baran reportedly died on March 12, 1994, in the Yılan Mountain range, by strangulation. It was alleged that he was executed by the PKK unit led by Hıdır Sarıkaya, although during the PKK 5th congress, Dr. Baran was declared a "revolutionary martyr" who committed suicide due to depression for not fulfilling his duties. His son, Aslan Durgun, tried to desert the PKK and finally escaped after a year, also having surrendered and turned informant, and claimed that the PKK executed his father. The PKK, which already struggled to gain support in Tunceli, became increasingly unpopular in the region after the claims circulated that Dr. Baran was executed by the group for acting independently. He was succeeded in 1994 by Şemdin Sakık as commander of the Tunceli region.
