= Bu Devran =

Studio album by Güler Duman
- Released: September 15, 1995
- Recorded: April–August 1995
- Studio: Studio Metropol (Istanbul)
- Genre: Turkish folk music
- Length: 45:39
- Label: Duygu Music
- Producer: Sinan Çelik

Güler Duman chronology
Güler Duman '94 (1994)	Bu Devran (1995)	Öl Deseydin Ölmez miydim? (1997)

Bu Devran is the thirteenth album by Turkish folk music singer Güler Duman, released on September 15, 1995. The album was released with Duygu Music label. With her 1994 album Güler Duman '94, she became the best-selling folk music artist of the year. Güler Duman, whose twelfth album remained on the charts for a long time, began recording her thirteenth album between April and August 1995. The album was produced and music directed by Sinan Çelik. The album, which took four months to record, featured the works of artists such as Bilal Ercan, Aşık Veysel, Mahzuni Şerif, Derdiyok Ali, Adem Arslandoğan, Teslim Budak, Sıddık Doğan, Rıza Engin and Teslim Budak. A few days after the album, the title track "Bu Devran" was released. With the release of the track, album sales soared and the album started to receive positive reactions. In addition to the title track, the album featured songs such as "Bugün Ben Şahımı Gördüm", "Can Efendim", "Her An Özlüyorum", "Kul Gibi" and "Yarin Mendili". The album, which remained at number one on the charts for weeks, became the most popular folk music of the year. It is one of the best-selling albums of the 90s and Turkish folk music. After the success of the album, which remained at the top of the charts for weeks and achieved high sales, many folk music artists postponed the release dates of their albums. Güler Duman received the Best Turkish Folk Music Female Artist award at the 2nd Kral Turkey Music Awards ceremony and became the successful folk music artist of the year. Güler Duman started to give folk music education at a music course in Hanover, Germany during the period she released the album and became one of the leading names in this field abroad. The album sold more than 500 thousand copies and became the best-selling folk music album of the year.

== Background ==
Güler Duman, who released many successful albums from the 1980s to the early 90s, moved to Germany in the summer of 1993 due to her mother's illness. She started recording the album in August 1993 and the recordings continued until the last month of the year. After four months of recording, she released her album Güler Duman '94 on February 22, 1994. The video clip of the track "Türkülerle Gömün Beni" was released with the album and the sales of the album showed a positive increase. She then released the track "Güle Yel Değdi" from the album. Selling 260 thousand copies, the album became one of the best-selling and most successful folk music albums of the year. He started recording his thirteenth album in April 1995. After about four months of recording, he released his album Bu Devran. A few days after the album was released, the title track "Bu Devran" was released as a video clip. With the release of the track, the sales of the album started to chart high. Shortly after the release of the album, he started teaching Turkish folk music at a music school in Hanover, Germany and became one of the pioneers in this field.

He started recording his thirteenth album in April 1995. After the album was released, it quickly rose to the top of the charts. It achieved great success by staying at the top of the charts for weeks. Due to the success of the album, folk music artists who were to release albums at the time postponed the release date of their albums. While the album was at the top of the charts, it also became one of the best-selling albums. The high sales of the album helped folk music to enter the charts again. On March 21, 1996, she was nominated in the Best Female Artist in Turkish Folk Music category at the 2nd Kral Turkey Music Awards ceremony and won the award. He could not attend the award ceremony because he was ill. İbrahim Tatlıses received his award from Erdal Özyağcılar on his behalf. Güler Duman, who had her own lyrics and compositions in her previous album, did not include any of her own works in this album.

== Recording and publishing ==
Güler Duman released her thirteenth album with Duygu Music, with whom she has been working since 1987. In 1993, Güler Duman moved to Hanover, Germany due to her mother's illness and achieved great success with her album Güler Duman '94, which she recorded in 1993. With the album, which was the best-selling folk music album of the year, he became one of the young master artists of folk music. In the first months of 1995, he lost his mother. In April 1995, he started recording his thirteenth album at Studio Metropol. He worked with many artists during the four months of recording. He worked with a crowded team and the recording of the album was completed in early August. The album was released on September 15, 1995, under the title Bu Devran. Sinan Çelik was the producer and music director of the album, which was released with Duygu Music label. Sinan Çelik took part in the kaval recordings of all the songs in the album except for the track "Erzurum Mountains". The album was produced by Gökhan Çelik. Ilyas Akkuyu took the photographs of the album which was recorded at Studio Metropol.

As in the previous album, Çetin Akdeniz took part on baglama and cava. Erdal Akkaya performed the chelpe parts of the baglama. Osman Aktaş played the kaval in the moving track "Erzurum Mountains", which ranked tenth in the album. Adil Çelebi and Eyüp Hamiş played the zurna and Ertan Tekin played the meyde. Cemal Kaplan played the bendir in the album and Pınar Beyhan and Adem Aslandoğan sang backing vocals. Just like "Türkülerlele Gömün Beni" and "Güle Yel Değdi" from Güler Duman '94, the title track "Bu Devran" was released from this album and had a great impact on the sales of the album. In the video clip of the track, she frequently appeared on television programs with the album. She sang the songs from the album at concerts and festivals and received positive reactions.

== Track listing ==
No.	Title	Writer(s)	Composer(s)	Length
1.	"Bu Devran"	Bilal Ercan	Bilal Ercan	3:47
2.	"Kul Gibi"	Aşık Veysel	Adem Aslandoğan	2:51
3.	"Yarin Mendili" (Uzun Hava)	Teslim Budak	Teslim Budak	5:32
4.	"Bugün Ben Şahımı Gördüm"	Mahzuni Şerif	Mahzuni Şerif	4:37
5.	"Can Efendim"	Adem Aslandoğan	Adem Arslandoğan	2:59
6.	"Değil"	İbrahim Karaca	Zülfü Seyhan	3:10
7.	"Bir Deli Rüzgarım"	Sıddık Doğan	Sıddık Doğan	4:32
8.	"Bu Nedir" (Uzun Hava)	Derdiyok Ali	Derdiyok Ali	4:43
9.	"Eğmeli Yar"	Sıddık Doğan	Sıddık Doğan	4:02
10.	"Erzurum Dağları"	Adem Aslandoğan	Adem Aslandoğan	3:50
11.	"Her An Özlüyorum"	Rıza Engin	Rıza Engin	3:27
12.	"Delal"	Bilal Ercan	Bilal Ercan	4:02
Total length:				45:39

== Music video ==
- "Bu Devran" (Published: 20 September 1995)

== Personnel ==
- Güler Duman – Vocal, bağlama
- Sinan Çelik – Album producer, music director, arrangement, kaval
- Gökhan Çelik – Producer
- Çetin Akdeniz – Bağlama, cura
- Erdal Akkaya – Şelpe (3)
- Osman Aktaş – Kaval (10)
- Adil Çelebi – Zurna
- Eyüp Hamiş – Zurna (9, 12)
- Ertan Tekin – Mey, balaban
- Cemal Kaplan – Bendir
- Pınar Beyhan, Adem Aslandoğan – Back vocal
- Bilal Ercan (1, 12), Aşık Veysel (2), Teslim Budak (3), Mahzuni Şerif (4), Adem Arslandoğan (5, 10), İbrahim Karaca (6), Sıddık Doğan (7, 9), Derdiyok Ali (8), Rıza Engin (11) – Songwriters
- Bilal Ercan (1, 12), Adem Aslandoğan (2, 5, 10), Teslim Budak (3), Mahzuni Şerif (4), Zülfü Seyhan (6), Sıddık Doğan (7, 9), Derdiyok Ali (8), Rıza Engin (11) – Composers
- Duygu Müzik – Production
- Stüdyo Metropol – Studio
- İlyas Akkuyu – Photos
- FRS Grafik – Design

== Award ==
Year	Award	Category	Result
1995	Kral Turkey Music Awards	Best Turkish Folk Music Female	Won
