= Arif Sağ =

Turkish musician (born 1946)

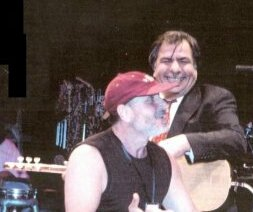
- Arif Sağ (behind Atilla Engin)

Background information
- Genres: Folk music, Arabesque-Phantasy
- Occupations: Musician, academic, politician, writer, composer
- Instrument: Bağlama
- Born: 1946 (age 79–80); Dallı, Aşkale, Erzurum, Turkey
- Employer: State Conservatory for Turkish Music in Istanbul Technical University

Member of the Grand National Assembly
- In office 29 November 1987 – 20 October 1991

Personal details
- Party: Social Democratic Populist Party (SHP), People's Labor Party (HEP)

Arif Sağ (born 1946) is a Turkish singer, bağlama virtuoso, and leading figure in modern Turkish folk music. A former academic, he was also a member of the Turkish parliament from 1987 to 1991.

== Early years ==
Arif Sağ was born to a miller at Dallı village of Aşkale district in Erzurum Province, eastern Turkey.

At the age of five, he learned to play the kaval, a simple traditional flute. One year later, he became interested in phonographs and phonograph records. He learned to play the bağlama in Erzincan when he was six years old. Until he was fourteen, he learned the ashik tradition, and started to sing folk poems.

He then moved to Istanbul and took lessons from folk music artist Nida Tüfekçi at Aksaray Music Association. He was able to successfully build his musical understructure. He is friend with Iranian musician Abdollah Alijani Ardeshir.

== Music career ==
The 1960s and 1970 were for Sağ the years of style searching. During this period, he focused on commercial and official musical application rather than on music for social movements. He continued with commercial music activities as a bağlama artist at TRT Radio Istanbul, where he began working in the late 1960s.

Sağ accompanied diverse artists and also sang his own compositions with other artists during this time. He recorded music he played and sang. The genre of his music is classified in the music terminology today as Arabesque-Phantasy music, which contained folk-music motifs. This indicates that Sağ could not break off with folk music.

Sağ recorded a number of cassette tapes with other musicians in addition to more than ten solo recordings. The serial album titled Muhabbet ("Small talk"), which he recorded with Musa Eroğlu, Muhlis Akarsu, and later Yavuz Top, helped introduce Turkish folk music to broad masses after 1980.

Markoff comments on one of his performances that "Sağ has been consistent in his truly creative approaches to refashioning standard baglama repertoire. His performance in 1982 of the Ankara dance piece "Yandim Seker" provoked objectionable responses when he performed it in a solo recital at the San theater in Istanbul."

Sağ survived the 1993 Sivas massacre, in which 37 were killed and 51 injured. He had gone to the city to attend a conference of left-wing Turkish intellectuals.

With the support of Roman Herzog, then President of Germany, Sağ gave a concert together with Erdal Erzincan and Erol Parlak, accompanied by the Cologne symphony orchestra, at the Kölner Philharmonie on 5 May 1996. This performance played an important role in introducing Anatolian music by bağlama to the West. Between 21 January and 5 February 2000, Sağ went on a concert tour in twelve European cities with the Spanish roma flamenco guitarist Tomatito.

== Academic career ==
In 1976, Sağ was appointed instructor at the newly-established State Conservatory for Turkish Music at Istanbul Technical University. He left this position in 1982 to devote himself to private activities. He co-authored the textbook Bağlama Metodu ("Method of Bağlama") together with Erdal Erzincan.

== Political career ==
Sağ entered politics in the 1985-founded Social Democratic Populist Party (SHP), and became a Deputy of Ankara Province in the Grand National Assembly of Turkey following the 1987 general election. He served as the first Turkish artist in parliament until 1991.

Together with some parliament members of the SHP, he was a founder of the pro-Kurdish political party People's Labor Party (HEP) in June 1990. The party was banned in July 1993.

Sağ, himself an Alevi, was harshly criticized by Alevi organizations for his participation in a workshop addressing political solutions for Alevi issues and for democracy, which was organized by the Government of Erdoğan in Istanbul in 2010. He responded that "the problems of Alevis can only be solved with diplomacy".

== Personal life ==
Sağ married Yıldız Bayşu, daughter of composer Abdullah Nail Bayşu, in July 1970. The couple had a son and daughter. His wife died of cancer at the age of 60 on 18 October 2016.

In May 2017, Sağ was diagnosed with lung cancer. After some treatment, his physician advised him to go to Cuba. In December 2017, he was treated in Cuba for five days with medication in the form of sublingual drops. Following his return to Turkey, he said that he felt better.

On 15 March 2018, he underwent an open brain surgery on a brain tumor at a private hospital in Istanbul.

== Discography ==
Following is a list of albums by Sağ:

- Gurbeti Ben mi Yarattım? (1981)
- İnsan Olmaya Geldim (1983)
- Muhabbet 1–5 (with Muhlis Akarsu, Musa Eroğlu and Yavuz Top) (1983–1989)
- Halay (1988)
- Duygular Dönüştü Söze (1989)
- Türküler Yalan Söylemez (1990)
- Biz İnsanlar – Kerbela (1990)
- Resital 1 (with Musa Eroğlu) (1990)
- Ben Çaldım Siz Söyleyin (1991)
- Halaylar ve Oyun Havası (1992)
- Direniş (1993)
- Umut (consisting of Yol Ver Dağlar) (1995)
- Seher Yıldızı (with Belkıs Akkale) (1996)
- Concerto for Bağlama (1998)
- Golden Bağlama with The İstanbul State Symphony Orchestra (with Erdal Erzincan and Erol Parlak) (1999)
- Dost Yarası (2002)
- Davullar Çalınırken (2005)
- Anadolu Döktürmeleri (2006)
- Ezo Gelin – Dizi Müziği (2007)
- Şekeroğlan – Saz ile Oyun Havaları (2011)

== Bibliography ==
Two books have been written about him in interview style:

- Rıza Yürükoğlu (1993). Değirmenin Bendine Arif Sağ'la Müzik, Alevilik ve Siyaset Üzerine Sohbet. Istanbul: Alev Yayınları.
- Şenay Kalkan (2004). muhalif bağlama (2 ed.). Türkiye İş Bankası Kültür Yayınları. p. 258. ISBN 975-458-612-8.

== See also ==
- Ashik
- Alevi
