= Başbağlar massacre =

Massacre in Turkey

Coordinates: 39°15′2.88″N 38°55′15.96″E

- Part of the Kurdish–Turkish conflict (1978-present)
- Location: Başbağlar, Kemaliye, Erzincan Province, Turkey
- Date: 5 July 1993
- Target: Sunni Muslim Turks (allegedly)
- Weapons: 5.56 automatic rifles, flammable materials
- Deaths: 33 (28 by gunfire and 5 burned to death)
- Perpetrators: Kurdistan Workers' Party, allegedly under the command of Dr. Baran
- No. of participants: ~100 militants from Tunceli (Turkish claim)
- Motive: Allegedly retaliation for the Sivas massacre
- 214 homes, a school, a mosque, a clinic and a community center were burnt down

The Başbağlar massacre (Turkish: Başbağlar Katliamı) is the name given to the 5 July 1993 massacre of 33 civilians in the village of Başbağlar (which was then burnt down), in Erzincan Province during the Kurdish-Turkish conflict. While the attack was originally attributed to the Kurdistan Workers' Party (PKK), the former Turkish special forces soldier Ayhan Çarkın claimed that the deep state was behind the massacre. But later he then said that all of his claims were "just predictions". The leader of the PKK, Abdullah Öcalan while in prison stated that massacre was committed by a PKK member codenamed "Dr. Baran". The occupants in the village of Başbağlar were Muslim Turks. Following the massacre, the population of the district and surrounding villages decreased as a result.

== Background ==
The small village of Başbağlar is located 220 kilometers from the city of Erzincan in the eastern Anatolian province of Erzincan's Kemaliye district.

== Incident ==
A 2022 indictment states that on the morning of the incident, approximately 100 PKK militants from the Tunceli region participated. It also states that the militants were given flammable materials to burn houses, and that the occupants of each house had been identified before being targeted. They first began as the evening call to prayer was being recited during which they cut off communication and electricity lines, starting from the mosque they took the imam to the village square, and gathered the women in the stream bed below the village. The PKK first killed five people by setting fire to their homes. They then gathered 28 men who were at a mosque for evening prayers in an empty area near the village. According to Turkish reports and an eyewitness the armed men spread “PKK propaganda” to the men, they then executed all of them by firing squad. According to this witness, they were shouting slogans as they were firing. Hundreds of empty shell casings were found during investigations after the incident. In total 558 shots were fired. According to Turkish source's, leaflets left on the bodies of the deceased said, "Revenge for Sivas has been taken.” The militants then moved on to setting the whole village on fire. 214 homes, a school, a mosque, a clinic and a community center were burnt down.

The Başbağlar massacre is considered one of the bloodiest mass killings in the history of the PKK. The motive was rooted in sectarianism, and the massacre was seen as retaliation for the Sivas massacre.

== Investigation ==
The perpetrators of the incident were never definitively found, and the Başbağlar trial, which began in 1993, closed three years later. The only person convicted in the trial was an informant who allegedly gave the names of the perpetrators of the massacre.

Nearly twenty people were allegedly arrested as part of the investigation, in which two people were jailed and sentenced to life imprisonment for being members of the PKK. Turkish authorities claimed that although the PKK apparently claimed responsibility for the attack, during interrogations, jailed PKK leader Abdullah Öcalan said that he had been unaware of the incident and stated that a PKK member codenamed Dr. Baran was responsible for the incident. In 1998 the case was closed.

Forensic examination of cartridge cases recovered from the scene found that 12 of 17 5.56×45 mm cases were fired from the same 5.56 mm automatic rifle, identified by its serial number. The 2022 indictment described the weapon as an American-made automatic rifle. the indictment which confirms that forensic examination of the spent cases found that the weapons used at Başbağlar had also been used in 10 other attacks in Tunceli and the Bingöl massacre both which took place between 1992 and 1994.

== Memory ==
On 5 July 2010, the Turkish minister Faruk Çelik visited Başbağlar to commemorate the day, he said: "No matter how many years pass after this incident, we will never forget this sorrow and those who caused it.”

in 2013 a memorial was opened to the public, located in the place of the massacre. It has preserved the pictures and items of the victims. The memorial was visited by President Recep Tayyip Erdoğan and the Governor of Erzican Hamza Aydoğdu. Every year on July 5th, a formal state and public commemoration ceremony is held at the site. Government representatives, local authorities, and hundreds of citizens gather at the village square.
