= Meriana =

Town of ancient Cilicia

Coordinates: 36°44′55″N 33°12′40″E

Meriana was a town of ancient Cilicia, inhabited in Roman times. The name does not occur among ancient authors but is inferred from epigraphic and other evidence.

It is located in Asiatic Turkey, between the Kravga and Esen neighborhoods (Mahallesi) of Göksu village, which is part of the Mut district in Mersin province.
