= Arzu Şahin =

Turkish singer (born 1978)

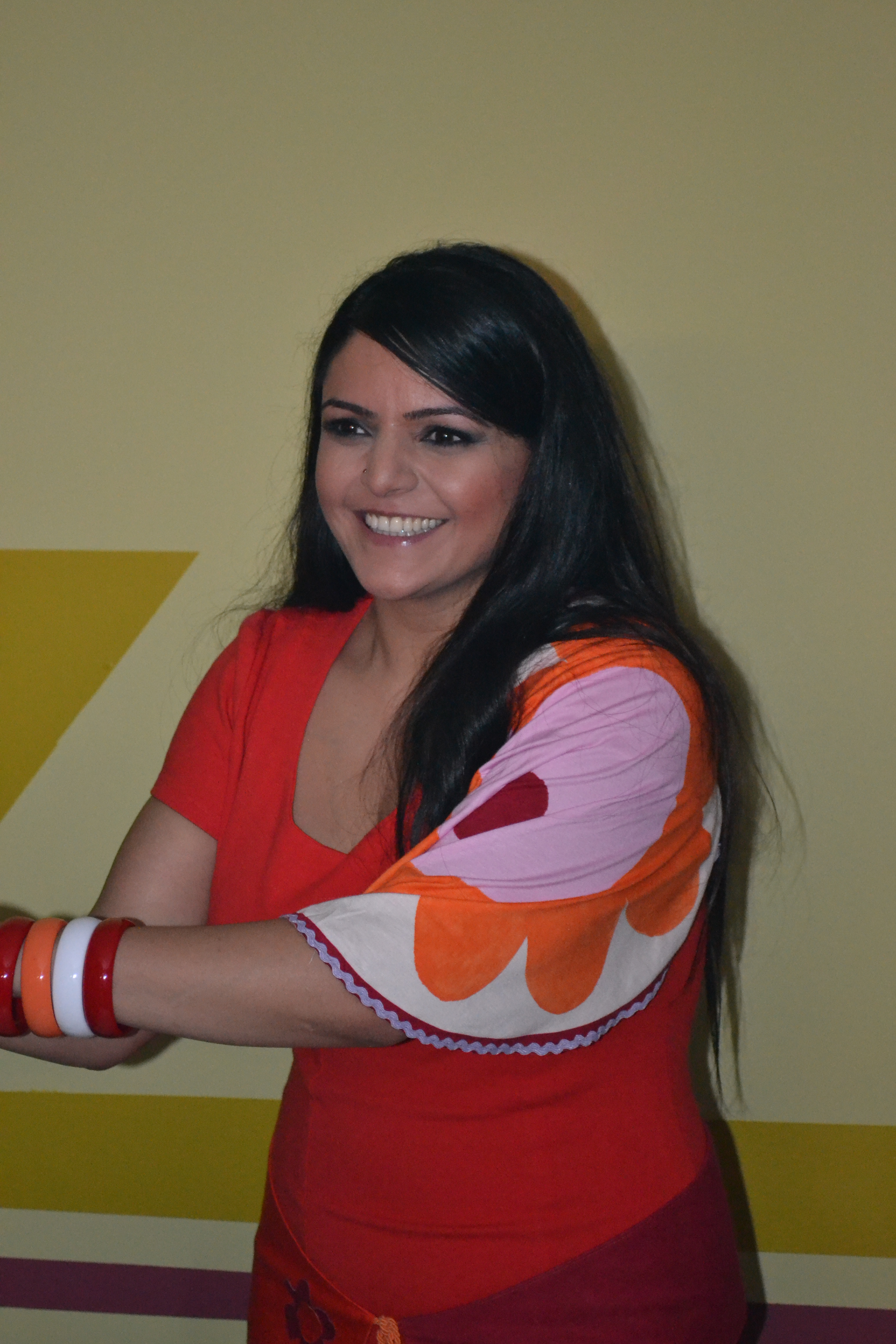
- Şahin in 2011

Background information
- Born: September 9, 1978 (age 48); Erzincan, Turkey
- Genre: Turkish folk
- Occupations: Singer, songwriter
- Instruments: Vocals, bağlama

Arzu Şahin (born September 9, 1978) is a Turkish folk singer.

== Biography ==
Şahin was born in Erzincan in 1978, but when she was young her family moved to Istanbul where she was raised. Şahin spent four years taking private singing lessons before her debut album Ceylanım. Şahin released her second album Ayrılık (Separation). In this album, the contributions of Kıvırcık Ali are enormous. Şahin is married to Abidin Biter and they have two sons.

== Discography ==
- 1999: Ceylanım
- 2002: Ayrılık
- 2004: Düet
- 2005: Sus
- 2008: Ne Fayda
- 2012: Ve... Aşk
