= Kravga Bridge =

- Coordinates: 36.7820°N 33.1850°E
- Crosses: Göksu River

Characteristics
- Material: Stone arches
- Total length: 83.40 m (273.6 ft)
- No. of spans: 3

History
- Construction start: 14th century
- Construction end: 14th century
- Closed: 1990

Location
- Interactive map of Kravga Bridge

Kravga (or Gravga) Bridge is a historical bridge in Mersin Province, Turkey.

== Geography ==
The bridge is in Göksu town which is in Mut district of Mersin Province. It is on the road to west and over Göksu River.

== History ==
It was constructed by the Karamanids, a Turkmen principality which ruled in the 13th-15th centuries (see Anatolian beyliks). According to Turkish General Directorate of Highways, they either fully constructed or used the foundations of a former bridge ruin (which was probably an early Roman bridge). This second hypothesis is supported by the fact that the masonry of the lower part of the arches and the rest of the bridge are different. The bridge was active until 1990.

== Construction ==
The structure is an arch bridge. There are three arches which are not symmetrical. One side arch is smaller than the other. The diameters of the arches from the east are 16.15 metres (53.0 ft), 19.70 metres (64.6 ft) and 8.20 metres (26.9 ft). The total length of the bridge is 83.40 metres (273.6 ft). There are two discharging cells and several open-spandrels which are thought to balance the weight. The width is 3.60 metres (11.8 ft) and the height of the parapet is about 1 metre (3 ft 3 in).
