= Haceri, Tunceli =

Village in Tunceli Province, Turkey

Haceri
- Village
- Location within Turkey
- Coordinates: 39.1275°N 39.7027°E
- Country: Turkey
- Province: Tunceli
- District: Tunceli
- Population (2021): 43
- Time zone: UTC+3 (TRT)

Haceri (formerly known as Güdeç, Kurdish: Xezeriye) is a village in the Tunceli District, Tunceli Province, Turkey. The village is populated by Kurds of the Alan tribe and had a population of 43 in 2021.

The hamlets of Göz, İnceler and Yukarıgüdeç are attached to the village.
