= Nesimi Çimen =

Turkish folk singer and poet

Nesimi Çimen (1931 – 2 July 1993) was a Turkish folk singer and poet. He was killed, along with 34 others, during the Sivas massacre in Sivas, Turkey when a group of Islamist rioters set fire to the hotel where the victims had gathered for the Pir Sultan Abdal festival.

== See also ==
- List of Turkish musicians
- List of massacres in Turkey
