= Göksu, Mut =

Settlement in Turkey

Göksu
- Neighbourhood
- Location in Turkey
- Coordinates: 36°47′02″N 33°10′41″E
- Country: Turkey
- Province: Mersin
- District: Mut
- Elevation: 320 m (1,050 ft)
- Population (2022): 1,799
- Time zone: UTC+3 (TRT)
- Postal code: 33600
- Area code: 0324

Göksu is a neighbourhood in the municipality and district of Mut, Mersin Province, Turkey. Its population is 1,799 (2022). Before the 2013 reorganisation, it was a town (belde). The town is inhabited by Tahtacı.

== Geography ==
Göksu is 45 kilometres (28 mi) from Mut and 205 kilometres (127 mi) from Mersin. The road to the town diverges from the Mersin-Karaman highway at around the Alahan Monastery. (But while the monastery is to the east, the town is to the west)

== History ==
The town is established in 1995 by merging four neighboring villages, namely Kravga, Bayır, Esen and Köprübaşı. Kravga, the central village is older than the present Turkmen population evident from its non Turkish name which is in Luwian and means mountain peak probably referring to high mountains at the west of the town. But the town itself is situated in the Göksu river valley. (In fact the town has recently been renamed after the river. But residents still prefer the name Kravga) According to Ottoman land titles, there were 34 houses in the settlement in 1500s

== Historical bridge ==
The Kravga Bridge in the Kravga quarter of the town dates back to Roman Empire times. It was later restored by the Karamanoğlu Beylik in ca 14th century. The bridge was in use up to 1985 when a modern bridge had been constructed just next to the old one.

== Economy ==
Economy of the town like most other towns depend on agriculture. Fruits like pomegranates, plums, apricots, grapes, figs as well as olives are the most pronounced products There is also a trout farm in the town.

== Notable people ==
Musa Eroğlu, musician
