= Başbağlar, Kemaliye =

Başbağlar
- Village
- Location within Turkey
- Coordinates: 39°14′46″N 38°53′33″E
- Country: Turkey
- Province: Erzincan
- District: Kemaliye
- Population (2022): 80
- Time zone: UTC+3 (TRT)

Başbağlar is a small village located in Kemaliye District, in Erzincan Province, Turkey. Its population is 80 (2022). Başbağlar is located approximately 137 miles (220 km) east of Erzincan.

== History ==
The village of Başbağlar was historically known as "Baratsor" (Բարաձոր) in Armenian.

The Başbağlar massacre (Turkish: Başbağlar katliamı) is the name given to the 5 July 1993 event in which 33 civilians were killed, and the village of Başbağlar burnt down. The attack was originally attributed to the Kurdistan Workers' Party (PKK) and Abdullah Öcalan stated that massacre was committed by a PKK member codenamed Dr. Baran while ex-special forces soldier Ayhan Çarkın said that the deep state was behind the massacre. According to the Turkish government, several PKK members stormed the village in 1993 and went on killing 33 civilians after rounding them up. Over 200 houses, a clinic, a school and a mosque in the village were burned down.
