= Governor of Erzincan =

Governor of a Turkish Province

Governor of Erzincan Erzincan Valiliği
- Logo of the Governor of Erzincan
- Incumbent; Hamza Aydoğdu since August 18, 2023
- Appointer: President of Turkey; On the recommendation of the Turkish government
- Term length: No set term length or limit
- Inaugural holder: Nafiz Ergün; 1924
- Website: Office of the Governor

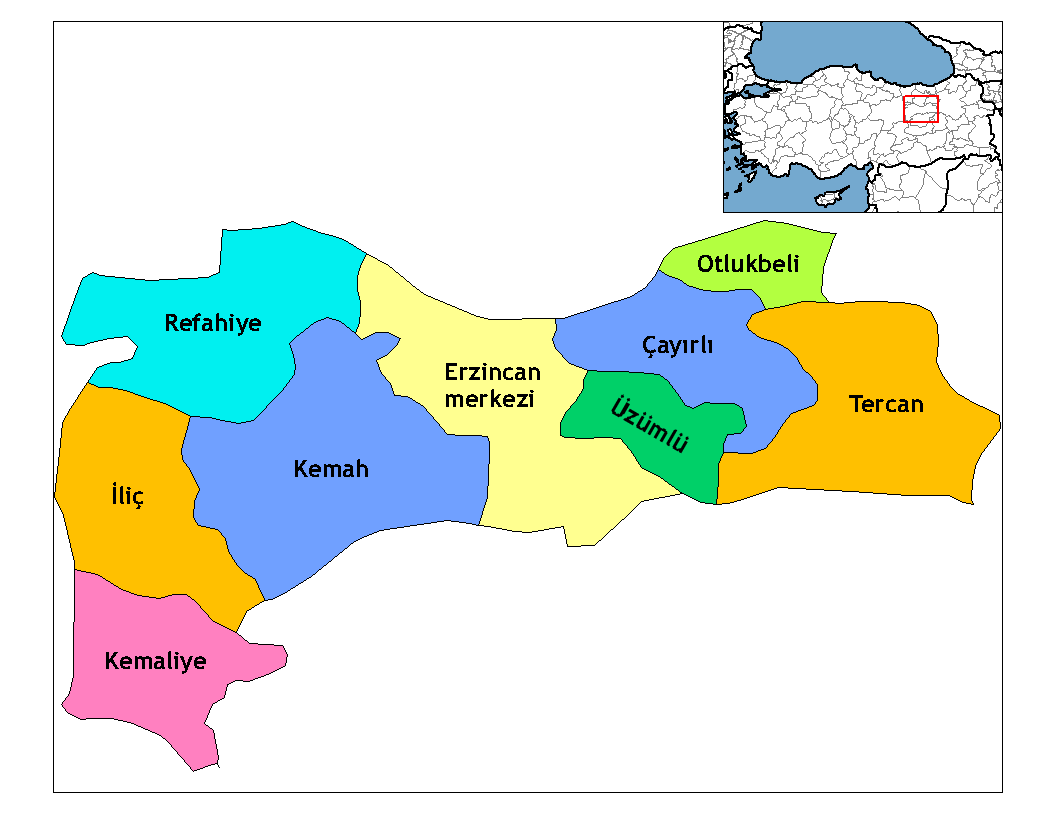
Map of the Province of Erzincan, showing the provincial districts.

The Governor of Erzincan (Turkish: Erzincan Valiliği) is responsible for the implementation of government legislation within Erzincan Province, Turkey. The governorship is a civil service office appointed by the government of Turkey. The Governor is also the most senior commander of both the Erzincan provincial police force and the Erzincan Gendarmerie.

== Appointment ==
The Governor of Erzincan is appointed by the President of Turkey, who confirms the appointment after recommendation from the Turkish Government. The Ministry of the Interior first considers and puts forward possible candidates for approval by the cabinet. The Governor of Erzincan is therefore not a directly elected position and instead functions as the most senior civil servant in the Province of Erzincan.

=== Term limits ===
The Governor is not limited by any term limits and does not serve for a set length of time. Instead, the Governor serves at the pleasure of the Government, which can appoint or reposition the Governor whenever it sees fit. Such decisions are again made by the cabinet of Turkey. The Governor of Erzincan, as a civil servant, may not have any close connections or prior experience in Erzincan Province. It is not unusual for Governors to alternate between several different Provinces during their bureaucratic career.

== Functions ==
The Governor of Erzincan has both bureaucratic functions and influence over local government. The main role of the Governor is to oversee the implementation of decisions by government ministries, constitutional requirements and legislation passed by Grand National Assembly within the provincial borders. The Governor also has the power to reassign, remove or appoint officials a certain number of public offices and has the right to alter the role of certain public institutions if they see fit. Governors are also the most senior public official within the Province, meaning that they preside over any public ceremonies or provincial celebrations being held due to a national holiday. As the commander of the provincial police and Gendarmerie forces, the Governor can also take decisions designed to limit civil disobedience and preserve public order. Although mayors of municipalities and councillors are elected during local elections, the Governor has the right to re-organise or to inspect the proceedings of local government despite being an unelected position.

== List of governors of Erzincan ==
- Hasan Faiz Ergun (1924–1926)
- A. Cevdet Bey (1927)
- Fevzi Daldal (1927–1928)
- Ahmet Azmi Bey (1928)
- Hasan Tahsin Bey (1928–1930)
- Ali Kemali Aksüt (1930–1932)
- A. Muhtar Bey (1932–1933)
- Mehmet Fahri Özen (1934–1940)
- Sabri Kâzım Süer (1940–1942)
- Rifat Şahinbaş (1942–1943)
- İbrahim Ethem Bozkurt (1943–1945)
- Teofik Sırrı Gür (1945–1947)
- Mitat Ali Kışlalı (1947–1948)
- Cemal Celal Tüzün (1948–1950)
- Ahmet Demir (1950–1951)
- Fevzi Karakülah (1951–1953)
- Ali Rıza Yaradanakul (1953–1954)
- Eşref Ayhan (1954–1955)
- Sait Kemalî Atay (1955–1960)
- Yakup Yücel (1960)
- Sadi Kâzım Süer (1960–1961)
- Cezmi Kartay (1961–1962)
- Ahmet Sadullah Verel (1962–1964)
- Mehmet Aldan (1964–1966)
- Ali Rıza Yaradanakul (1966–1968)
- Fahri Centel (1968–1970)
- Mustafa Kemal Demirtaş (1970–1972)
- Sabahattin Çakmakoğlu (1972–1975)
- Fikret Turgut Sayın (1975–1978)
- Yılmaz Ergun (1978–1979)
- Kenan Güven (1979–1981)
- Hasan Bamyacı (1981–1985)
- M. İlyas Aksoy (1985–1991)
- Recep Yazıcıoğlu (1991–1999)
- Halil Altınok (1999–2003)
- Refik Arslan Öztürk (2003–2006)
- Ali Güngör (2006–2008)
- Abdülkadir Demir (2008–2011)
- Selman Yenigün (2011–2013)
- Abdurrahman Akdemir (2013–2014)
- Süleyman Kahraman (2014–2016)
- Ali Arslantaş (2016–2020)
- Mehmet Makas (2020–2023)
- Doç. Dr. Hamza Aydoğdu (2023–2026)

== See also ==
- Governor (Turkey)
- Erzincan Province
- Ministry of the Interior (Turkey)
