= Orhan Ölmez =

Turkish singer, composer, and songwriter (born 1978)

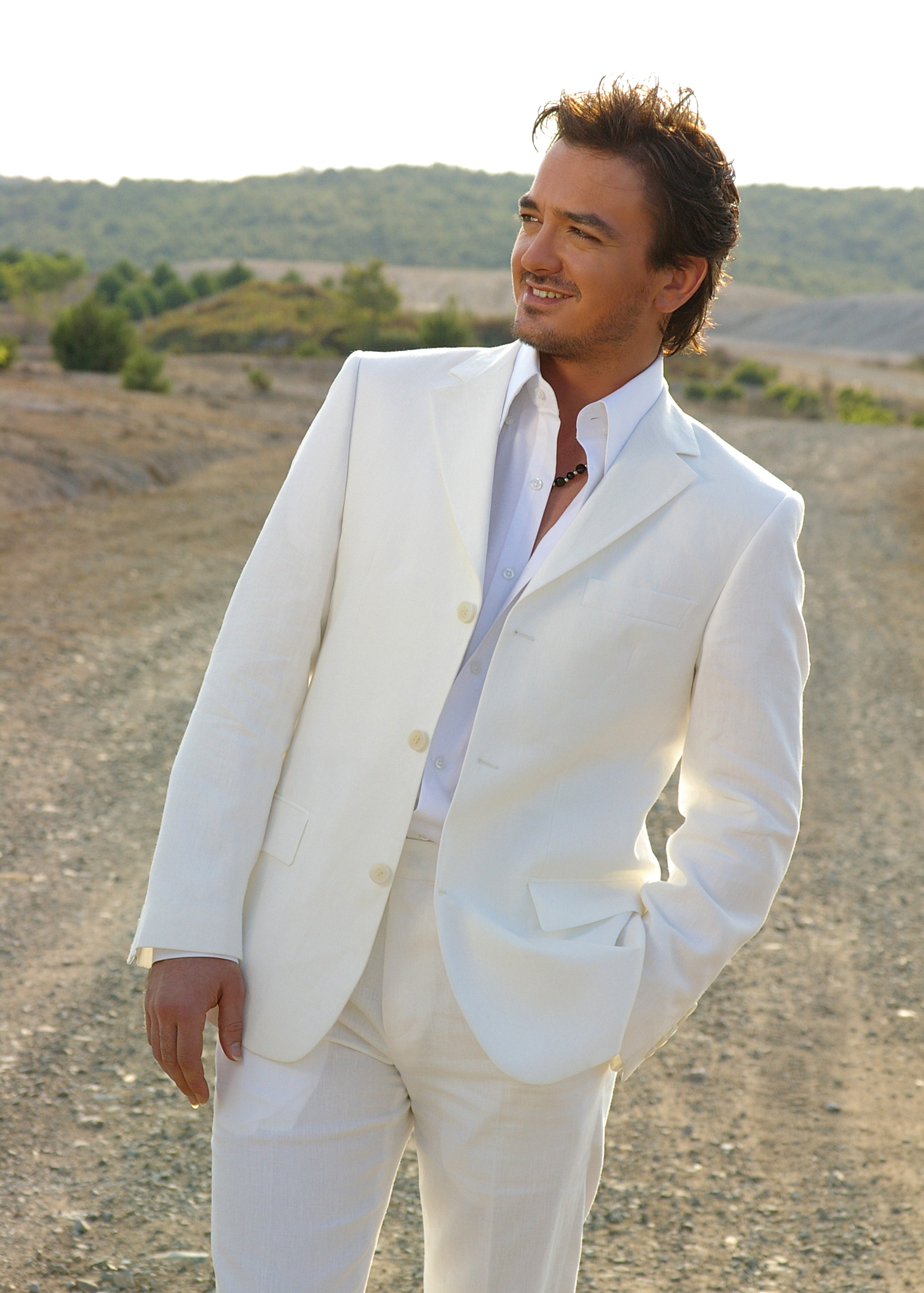

Background information
- Born: May 1, 1978 (age 48)
- Origin: Manavgat, Antalya, Turkey
- Genres: Fantasy; Turkish folk
- Occupations: Singer; TV show host; songwriter; composer
- Instruments: Bağlama; guitar; violin; oud; piano; ney
- Years active: 2001–present
- Labels: İdeal Müzik; Arma; Ölmez Müzik
- Website: orhanolmez.com

Orhan Ölmez (born May 1, 1978) is a Turkish singer, composer, and songwriter.

== Biography ==
He was born in Manavgat, a town in Antalya, on May 1, 1978. His paternal relatives are from Divriği, Sivas. His maternal relatives are from Turgutlu, Manisa. He lived in İzmir for 15 years. He discovered his interest in music when he was introduced to the saz in 1986 and 1987. He was interested in western music and established the base of his current music during his high school years. He completed high school in İzmir. He attended state Turkish Music in The Turk Music Conservatory of Aegean University. He worked as a saz player in The Turkish Folk Music sect for one year for İzmir Radio. Later, he started his professional art life by working as composer and arranger in İstanbul and İzmir. In 2003, he came out with his first cassette called Su Misali on which he tried hard, and he ranged high and rose to fame in music industry. In 2005, he had his second album called Herşeyin Farkındayım and became more successful. In 2006, he was elected as the Best Male Fantasy Music Performer of the Year in the Kral TV music awards contests held by Kral TV. During the Ramadan of 2006, he prepared and presented Iftar and Suhur programs.

== Albums ==
- Su Misali (2003)
- Her Şeyin Farkındayım (2005)
- Damla Damla (2008)
- Orhan Ölmez (2011)
- 2+20 (2012)
- Türkü (2014)
- Ya Olmasaydın (2015)
- Adam ve Kadın (2016)

== Music videos ==
Su Misali (2003)

- 1. Su Misali
- 2. İzin Verme
- 3. Özledim

Herşeyin Farkındayım (2005)

- 4. Bana Bırak
- 5. Aşk Beni Sevmedi
- 6. Bensiz Aşka Doyma
- 7. Sabır Lazım
- 8. Yalvarayım mı

Damla Damla (2008)

- 9. Damla Damla
- 10. Iki Elin Kanda Olsa Da Gel
- 11. Yani Olmuyor
- 12. Yasa Dışı

Orhan Ölmez (2011)

- 13. Bilmece
- 14. Senden Vazgeçtim
- 15. Nezaket
