= Zara (Turkish singer) =

Turkish folk singer and actress (born 1976)

- Born: Neşe Yılmaz; 15 January 1976 (age 50); Istanbul, Turkey
- Genres: Arabesque; İlahi; Turkish folk; classical Turkish
- Occupations: Singer, actress
- Instrument: Vocal
- Years active: 1986–present
- Labels: Poll Production; DMC; Esen Müzik; Seyhan Müzik; ZR Müzik; Ulus Müzik
- Website: zara.web.tr

Neşe Yılmaz (born 15 January 1976), known by her stage name Zara, is a popular Turkish folk singer and actress of Kurdish descent. She was born in Üsküdar district of Istanbul on 15 January 1976. She released eight albums using the nickname "Neşecik".

She married İskender Ulus, the owner of the recording company Ulus Müzik, in 2002. They divorced in 2007. Her second marriage was to Akif Beki, the chief counselor of Recep Tayyip Erdoğan and journalist in Hürriyet newspaper, in 2012. Their daughter Dila was born in December. The couple divorced in July 2016.

== Discography ==
Year	Album
1998	Avuntu
2000	Boyut
2002	Misafir
2003	Özlenenler
2005	Zamanı Geldi
2005	Bülbül-i Şeyda
2008	Bahar
2011	Hazine
2012	Zara ve İstanbul Flamenko 5'lisi
2014	Derin Aşk
2016	Derin Aşk 2
2018	Derin Aşk 3

As "Neşecik"

- Eyvahlar Olsun (1986)
- Yaşamak Bu Değil (1987)
- Garibim (1988)
- Taptığım Allah, Sevdiğim Sensin (1989)
- Acımasız Dünya (1990)
- Çek Kara Tren (1991)
- Canım Askerim (1994)
- Gurbet & Ağla Sevdiğim (1995)

== Filmography ==
Year	Film	Notes
1999	Eylül Fırtınası	Movie
2001	Deli Yürek: Bumerang Cehennemi	Movie
2003	Gelin	TV series
2008	İpsiz Recep	TV series
2017	Eşkıya Dünyaya Hükümdar Olmaz	TV series
2021	Mavera	TV series

== TV programs ==
Year	TV program	Channel
2005	Zamanı Geldi	TRT 1
2006	Tanrı Misafiri	ATV
2009–2011	Salı Sefası	TV8
2015	Sonsuz Şarkı	TRT Müzik
