= Hasret Gültekin =

- Born: Hasret Şükrü Gültekin; 1 May 1971; İmranlı, Sivas Province, Turkey
- Died: 2 July 1993 (aged 22) Sivas, Turkey
- Occupations: Singer-songwriter; composer; record producer; virtuoso
- Instruments: bağlama; car; tar; kemane
- Years active: 1987–1993
- Labels: Armoni; Raks; Nepa
- Website: hasretgultekin.net

Hasret Şükrü Gültekin (1 May 1971 – 2 July 1993) was a Kurdish musician and poet. He was murdered in the Sivas massacre, along with 34 other people in the Sivas Province of Turkey when an Islamist mob set fire to the Madımak Hotel. He was Kurdish and Alevi.

Gültekin was born in the Han village of Sivas as the third child of Süleyman and Hacıhanım Gültekin. He started playing bağlama at the age of six and dropped out of high school to pursue a career in music. He completed his first album Gün Olaydı (If It Had Been Day) when he was only sixteen years old. In 1989, he demonstrated his mastery of the şelpe technique of bağlama on his second album Gece ile Gündüz Arasında (Between Night and Day). His third album Rüzgarın Kanatları (The Wings of the Wind) was released in 1991. Later that year he married Yeter Gültekin. On 2 July 1993 he went to Sivas to take part in the Pir Sultan Abdal Cultural Festival alongside many other musicians, authors, poets and intellectuals. He died at the age of 22 during the arson attack on the Madimak Hotel where he was staying. His wife gave birth to their son, Roni Hasret Gültekin, three months after his death.

In 2020, a statue of Gültekin was erected on the grounds of a cemevi (Alevi prayer house) in the Turkish province of Tunceli. The Cemevi also created a monument to the 33 others who died in the Sivas massacre.
