= Muhlis Akarsu =

Turkish folk singer and musician

Background information
- Born: 20 February 1948
- Died: 2 July 1993 (aged 45)
- Occupation: Folk singer

Muhlis Akarsu (20 February 1948 – 2 July 1993) was a Turkish folk singer and Bağlama player. He was killed, along with 34 others, during the Sivas massacre in Sivas, Turkey when a group of Islamist rioters set fire to the hotel where the victims had gathered for the Pir Sultan Abdal festival.

== See also ==
- List of Turkish musicians
- List of massacres in Turkey
