= Sivas massacre =

Massacre in Turkey

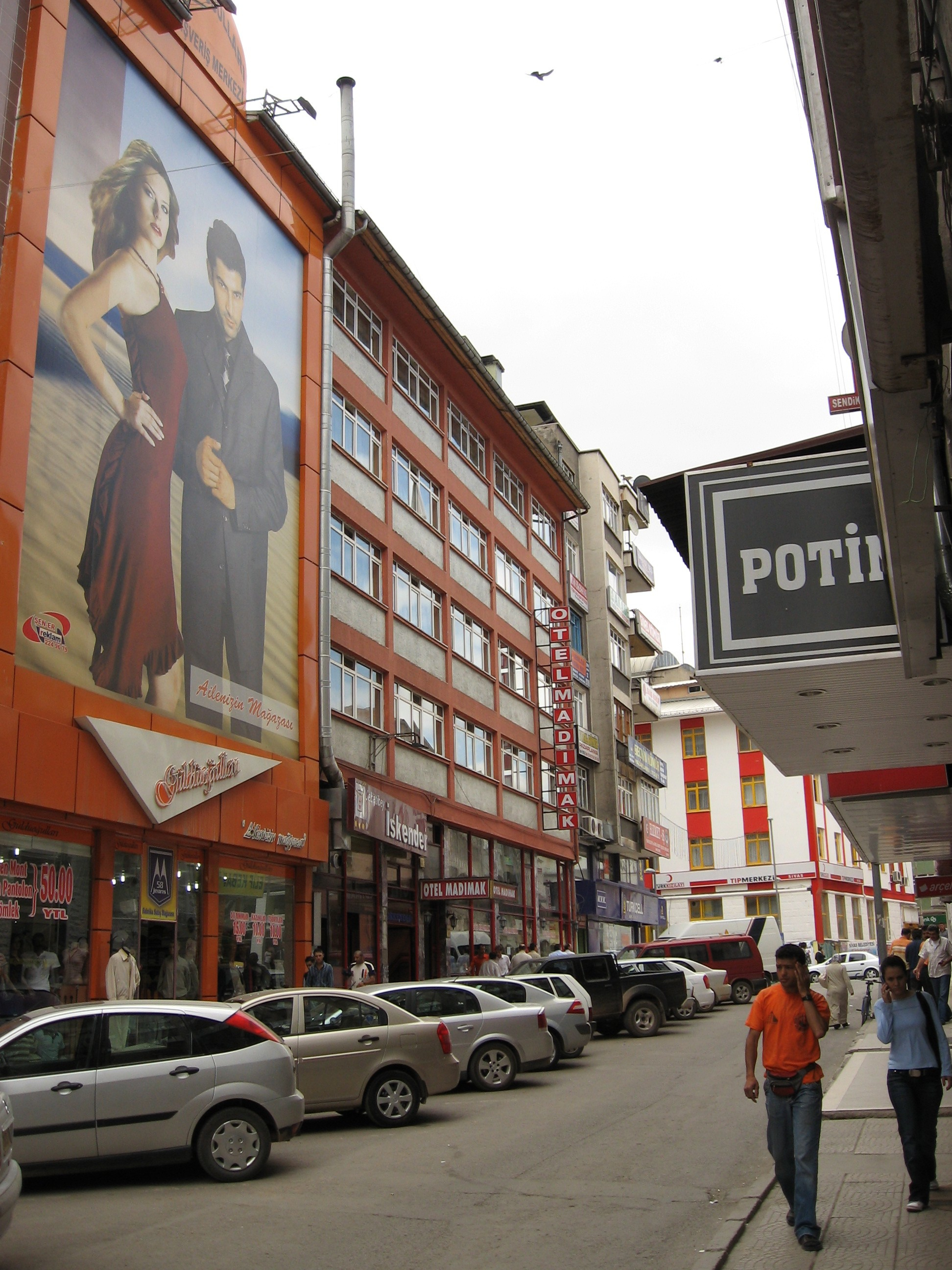
- Otel Madımak in Sivas, site of the Alevi massacre (picture taken in 2007)
- Location: 39.75°N 37.02°E; Sivas, Turkey
- Date: 2 July 1993; 33 years ago
- Target: Alevi intellectuals collectively, attributed to mob anger against Aziz Nesin by Turkish government officials
- Attack type: Massacre, arson
- Deaths: 35 which 10 were under 18 (plus two perpetrators)
- Injuries: 51+
- Perpetrator: Sunni Islamists

The Sivas massacre (Turkish: Sivas Katliamı) or Madımak massacre (Turkish: Madımak Katliamı) refers to an act of mob arson taking place on 2 July 1993 at the Hotel Madımak (Otel Madımak) in Sivas, Turkey, which resulted in the killing of 37 people, including about half who were Alevi women and children but also some intellectuals. Two perpetrators also died during the incident. The victims, who had gathered in the hotel for the Pir Sultan Abdal festival, were killed when a mob set fire to the hotel.

== Incident ==
The attack took place not long after traditional Friday prayers, when the mob broke through police barricades to surround the Hotel Madımak, where artists, writers and musicians had gathered to celebrate the life of 16th-century Alevi poet Pir Sultan Abdal. The hotel was set alight, and the fire claimed 37 lives, including those musicians and poets attending the festival.

Attending the conference was left-wing Turkish intellectual Aziz Nesin, who was hated by many Muslims in Turkey because of his attempt to publish Salman Rushdie's controversial novel, The Satanic Verses, regarded by many Muslims as blasphemous. Thousands of Sunni residents of Sivas, after attending Friday prayers in a nearby mosque, marched to the hotel in which the conference was taking place and set the building on fire. While the Turkish government portrayed the attack as aimed at Aziz Nesin, Alevi commentators argue that the target were the Alevis, as the mob also destroyed a statue depicting Pir Sultan Abdal erected the day before. Many well-known Alevi intellectuals, poets and musicians were killed in the fire, including Hasret Gültekin, Metin Altıok, Asım Bezirci, Behçet Aysan, Nesimi Çimen and Muhlis Akarsu. Aziz Nesin managed to escape the fire over a ladder. After the firefighters recognized who he was, they started to attack him, but he ran away.

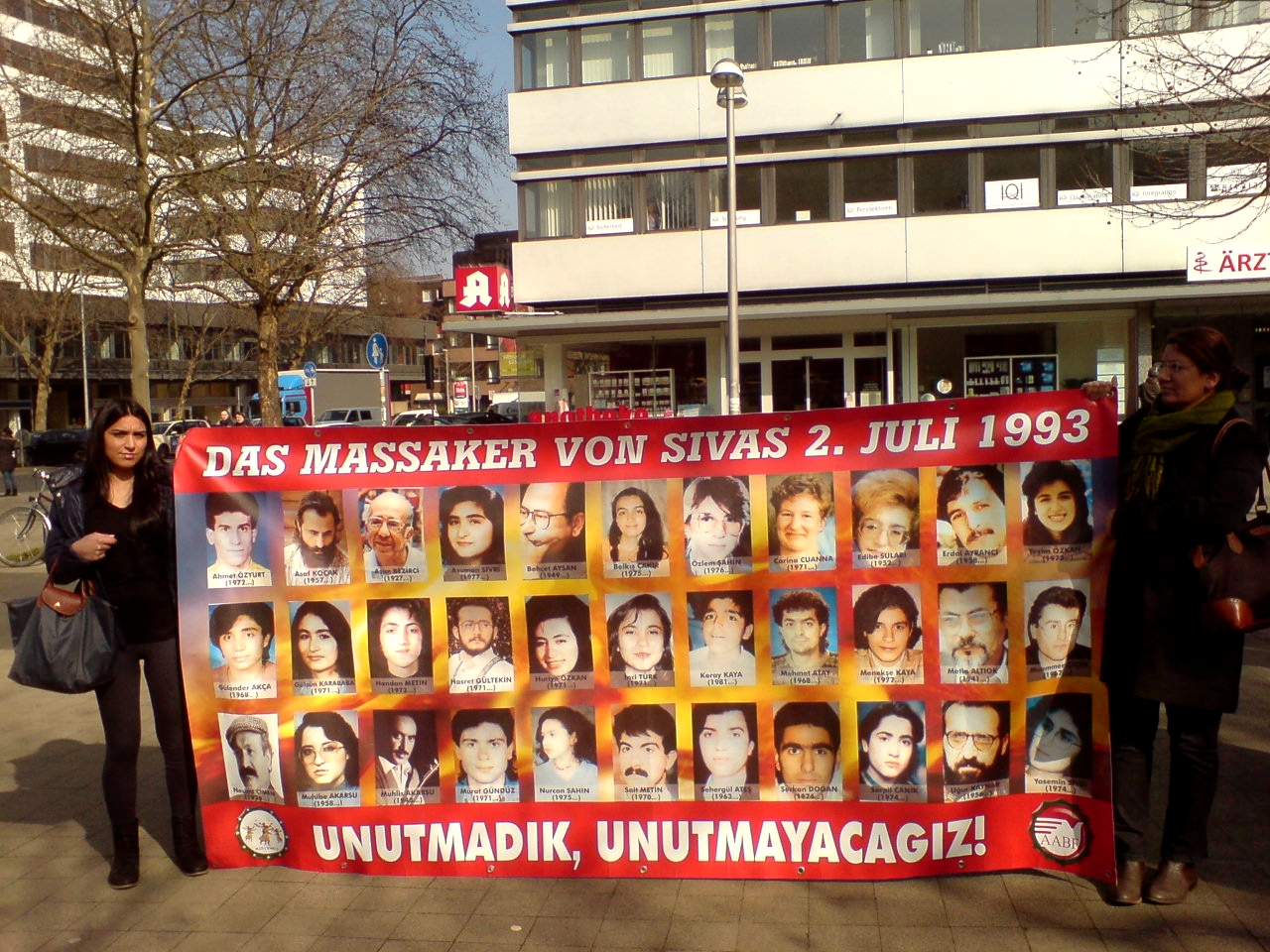
Banner with photos from the victims of the Sivas massacre on 2 July 1993. The sentence at the bottom reads "We didn't forget, we won't forget!" in Turkish.

== Aftermath ==
The response from the security forces at the time and afterwards was weak. The assault took place over eight hours without any intervention by the police, military or fire department. Alevis and most intellectuals in Turkey argue that the incident was triggered by the local government as flyers and leaflets were published and given out for days before the incident. The Turkish government refers to the Sivas Madımak Hotel incident as an attack on intellectuals but refuses to see it as an incident directed towards Alevis. The events surrounding the massacre were captured by TV cameras and broadcast all over the world. Every year, during the anniversary of the massacre, various Alevi organizations call for the arrest of those responsible.

Two of the suspects, including Cafer Erçakmak died while on trial. In March 2012, the Sivas massacre case against the remaining five defendants was dropped, owing to the statute of limitations. However, this case is still being appealed.

The Başbağlar massacre only two days later, organized by PKK commander Dr. Baran, was seen as retaliation for Madimak.

=== Indictments, trial and sentences ===
The event was seen as a major assault on free speech and human rights in Turkey, and significantly deepened the rift between religious and secular segments of the society. A day after the incident, 35 people were arrested. Then the number of detainees increased to 190. A total of 124 out of the 190 defendants were charged with "attempting to establish a religious state by changing the constitutional order" and were indicted on charges. The first hearing of the case, publicly known as the Sivas Massacre Trial, Ankara State Security Court No. 1, was held on 21 October 1993. On 26 December 1994 a verdict was reached in the case of the 124 defendants: 15 years in prison for 22 suspects, 10 years in prison for 3 defendants, 3 years and 9 months for 54 suspects, 2 years and 4 months for 6 suspects, and the acquittal of 37 of the defendants. Another 14 suspects were sentenced to 15 years in prison. The remaining 33 defendants were charged with 35 counts of murder. After lengthy court proceedings, the State Security Court sentenced the 33 defendants to death on 28 November 1997 for their roles in the massacre; 31 of these sentences were upheld in a 2001 appeal. When Turkey overturned the death penalty just over a year later in 2002, the sentences were commuted. Each defendant received 35 life sentences, one for each murder victim and additional time for other crimes. These 31 convicts were the only ones still serving time for the crimes; the other defendants were paroled early or released after completing their sentences. In January 2020, Ahmet Turan Kılıç, who at first was sentenced to death for his involvement in the Sivas massacre, was granted a commutation of his sentence by President Recep Tayyip Erdoğan on the grounds of ill-health. As a result his sentence was commuted. Kılıç died in 2021. In September 2023, Erdoğan commuted the sentence of Hayrettin Gül for the same reason. In the case where the fugitive defendants Murat Sonkur, Eren Ceylan, and Murat Karataş are being tried, the case was dropped in September 2023 on the grounds that the 30-year statute of limitations had expired.

=== Commemoration ===
Each year on the anniversary of the massacre, demonstrators hold protests and vigils to commemorate the victims of the fire. Dario Fo remembered the massacre in his speech accepting the Nobel Prize in 1997. Many wish to see the hotel, which has since re-opened, declared a memorial and turned into a museum. In 2008 a government minister indicated that it would be turned into an Alevi cultural center, but this has yet to occur. In June 2010, the Minister of Work and Social Security announced that the money for buying the hotel had been transferred, and that the Ministry would provide additional resources for restoration. Following the court ruling on 23 November 2010, Hotel Madımak has become a public entity for a compensation of 5,601,000 TL to the hotel owners.

=== Allegations ===
Islamic-conservative newspaper Yeni Akit published a front-page story on 23 July 2012 declaring the Sivas massacre a "19-year lie", claiming the victims had been killed by gunshots rather than fire on the basis of morgue photos it claimed were previously unpublished. The claims were debunked, and widely condemned.

In 2015, Huseyin Ergun, the leader of SHP (Social Democratic People's Party) also made similar statements suggesting that there were traces of the “deep state” in the massacre.

== See also ==
- List of massacres in Turkey
- Xenophobia and discrimination in Turkey
- Istanbul pogrom
