= Musa Eroğlu =

Musical artist (born 1946)

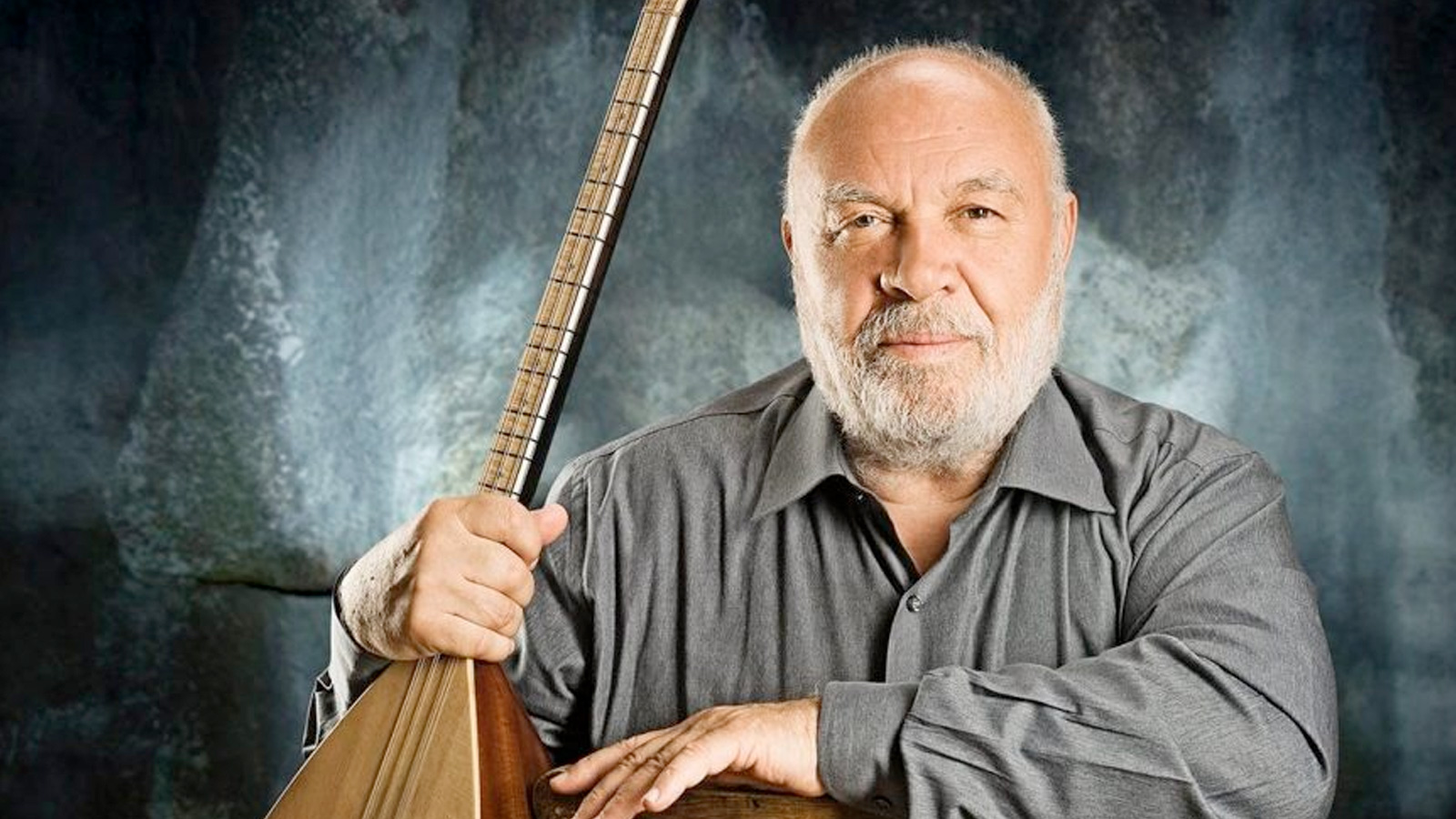

Background information
- Born: 1946 (age 79–80); Göksu, Mut, Turkey
- Genre: Turkish Folk
- Instrument: Bağlama
- Years active: 1969–present
- Spouse: Fatma Eroğlu
- Website: www.musaeroglu.com.tr

Musa Eroğlu (born 1946) is a Turkish folk musician and bağlama virtuoso.

== Life and Career ==
He was born in the Mut county district of Mersin. He is a Tahtacı. He completed his secondary education in Mut. He then started to perform Turkish folk dance and music. In 1965, he participated in Ankara Radio's exam but did not pass. In 1969, he released his first record "İkimiz Toprağa Girelim Elif".

Together with his wife whom he married in 1966, they have two daughters and one son.

== Albums ==
Musa Eroğlu has published at least 37 albums between 1975 and 2018.

1. 1975 - A Kuzum, Yağmur Plak
2. 1977 - Yaralı Turnam, Özaydın Müzik
3. 1978 - Bu Dünya, Harika Kasetçilik
4. 1979 - Yaz Gelir, Şah Plak
5. 1983 - Muhabbet 1 (Arif Sağ ve Muhlis Akarsu ile birlikte), Şah Plak
6. 1984 - Muhabbet 2 (Arif Sağ ve Muhlis Akarsu ile birlikte), Şah Plak
7. 1985 - Muhabbet 3 (Muhlis Akarsu, Arif Sağ ve Yavuz Top ile birlikte), Şah Plak
8. 1986 - Muhabbet 4 (Arif Sağ ve Yavuz Top ile birlikte), Şah Plak
9. 1987 - Muhabbet 5 (Muhlis Akarsu, Arif Sağ ve Yavuz Top ile birlikte), Şah Plak
10. 1987 - Seher Oldu Ey Nigarım, Bey Plak
11. 1988 - Muhabbet 6 (Muhlis Akarsu ve Yavuz Top ile birlikte), Pınar Müzik (daha sonra Kalan Müzik yayınladı.)
12. 1988 - Yummayın Kirpiklerini, Aziz Plak
13. 1988 - Divane Gönlüm Benim, Aziz Plak
14. 1989 - Muhabbet 7 (Muhlis Akarsu ve Yavuz Top ile birlikte), Pınar Müzik (daha sonra Kalan Müzik yayınladı.)
15. 1990 - Bir Yanardağ Fışkırması, Majör Müzik
16. 1991 - Garip Yolcu, Net Ses
17. 1992 - Benim Dünyam, Net Ses
18. 1993 - Kevser Irmağı / Sevda Yükü, Net Ses
19. 1994 - Yol Ver Dağlar*, Duygu Müzik
20. 1994 - Bin Yıllık Yürüyüş 1, 2, Koda Müzik
21. 1994 - Musa Eroğlu 94, Net Ses
22. 1995 - Ömrüm Sana Doyamadım, Ajs Müzik
23. 1996 - Halil İbrahim* / Kerbela Destanı, Duygu Müzik
24. 1996 - Bağlama Resital 1,2 (Arif Sağ ile birlikte), ASM
25. 1997 - Semahlarımız, Bema Prodüksiyon
26. 1998 - Musique Instrumentale D'Anatolie (Arif Sağ ile birlikte), ASM
27. 1998 - Kavimler Kapısı Anadolu, Duygu Müzik
28. 2000 - Bir Nefes Anadolu, Duygu Müzik
29. 2003 - Sele Verdim, Duygu Müzik
30. 2004 - Sazımızla Sözümüzle 2 (Güler Duman ile birlikte), Duygu Müzik
31. 2007 - Dedem Korkut, Duygu Müzik
32. 2010 - Armağan 1 (Yusuf Gül ile birlikte), Özdemir Plak
33. 2010 - Semahlar, Mod Müzik
34. 2012 - Zamansız Yağmur, Özdemir Plak
35. 2015 - Musa Eroğlu ile Bir Asır, Özdemir Plak
36. 2016 - Taşeli Türküleri, Özdemir Plak
37. 2017 - MUSA EROĞLU - MİHRİBAN*
38. 2018 - Turnaların Göçü (Yeni Türküleriyle), Özdemir Plak
