= Aşık Mahzuni Şerif =

Turkish musician and poet (1940–2002)

Aşık Mahsuni Şerif
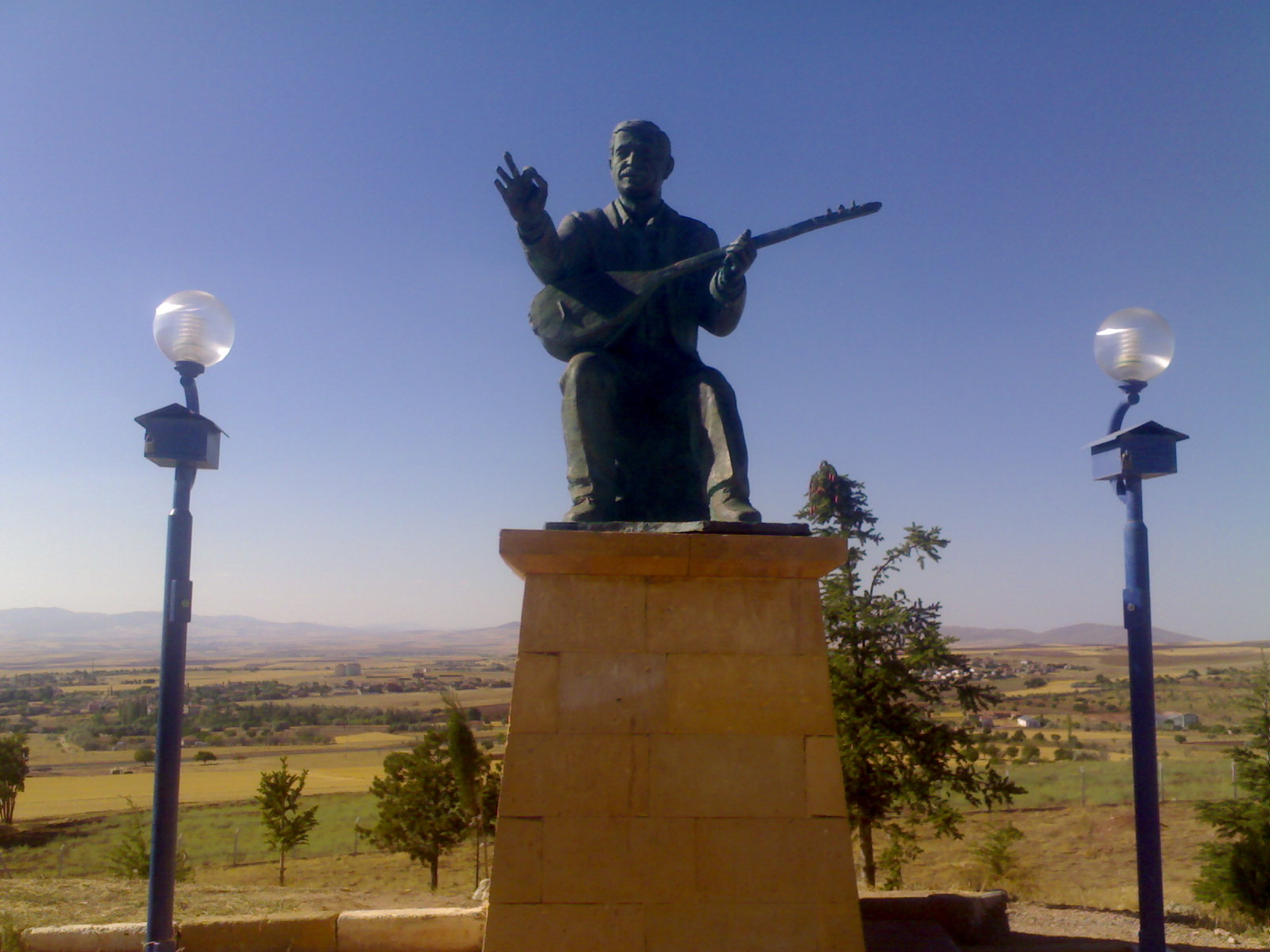
- Aşık Mahsuni Şerif's statue in Hacıbektaş, Nevşehir, Turkey

Background information
- Birth name: Şerif Cırık
- Also known as: Aşık Mahsuni Şerif, Mahsuni Şerif, Mahsuni
- Born: 17 November 1940 Berçenek Village, Afşin, Kahramanmaraş Province, Turkey
- Died: 17 May 2002 (aged 61) Porz, Köln, Germany
- Genres: Turkish folk music
- Years active: 1961-2002

Şerif Cırık, popularly known as Aşık Mahsuni Şerif, was a Turkish ashik, folk musician, composer, poet, and author. Aşık is a title used to indicate his position as a respected musician and his relationship with Alevism.

== Early life ==
Mahsuni Şerif was born in the Berçenek village of Afşin, Kahramanmaraş, Turkey in 1940.
