= Bağlama =

Stringed musical instrument

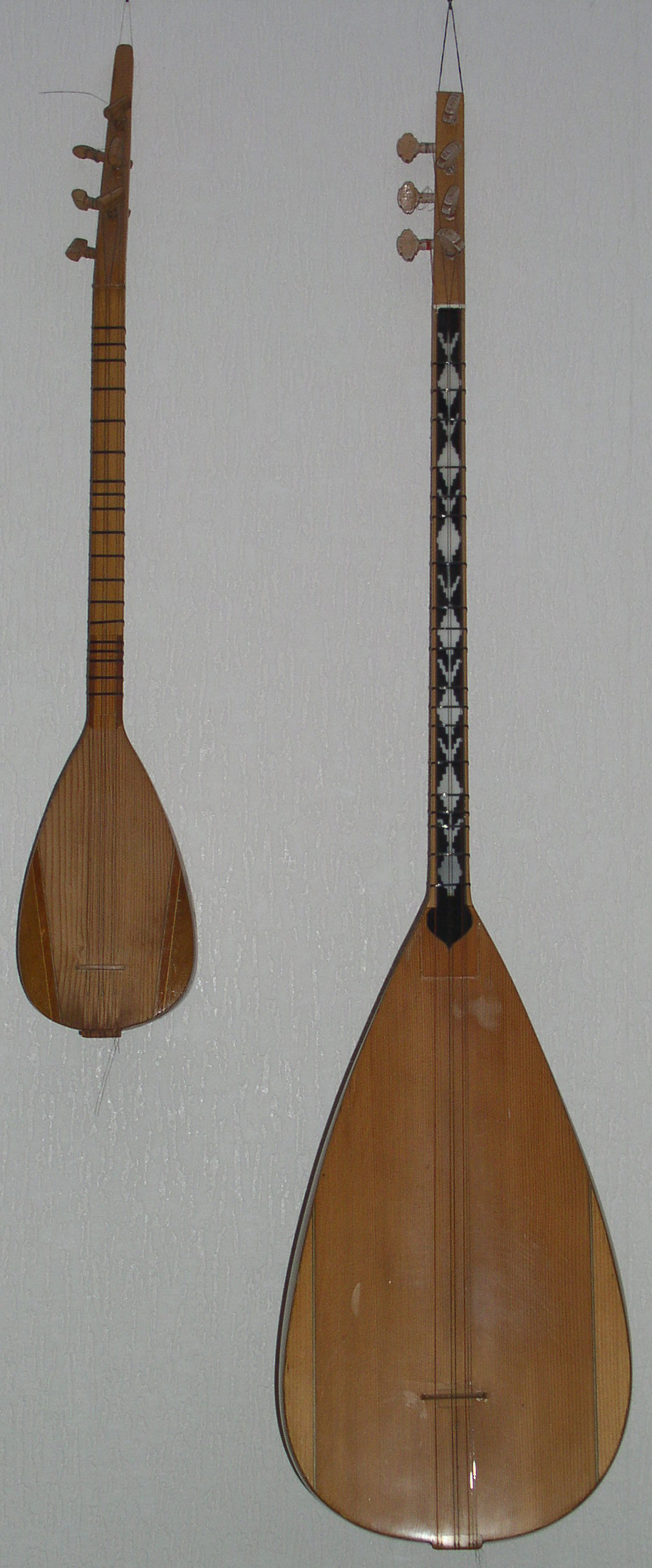
- Different sizes of bağlama: Cura (left, smallest) and Çöğür bağlaması/Tambura Bağlaması (right, middle sized)

String instrument
- Other names: Saz
- Classification: Plucked string instrument; Long-necked lute; Chordophone
- Hornbostel–Sachs classification: 321.321-6 (Necked bowl lute, sounded with a plectrum)
- Developed: Anatolia, Turkey

Related instruments
- Baglamadaki (Greece); Balkan tambura (Тамбура) (Levant, Anatolia, Thrace and Balkans); Bouzouki (Levant, Anatolia, Thrace, Balkans and Europe); Buzuq (Caucasus, Anatolia and Levant); Choghur (Azerbaijan and Georgia); Çiftelia (Thrace, Anatolia, Balkans and Europe); Dutar; Šargija (Thrace, Balkans and Europe); Setar; Tambouras (Caucasus, Levant, Anatolia, Thrace, Balkans and Europe); Tanbur (Caucasus, Iran and Turkey); Tar (lute) (Caucasus, Iran and Turkey)

Sound sample
- Saz sound

The bağlama, saz, tambura or bozuk is a long-necked fretted lute used in the folk music of Turkey, Azerbaijan, Armenia and neighbouring regions of the Balkans, and in West Asia. It belongs to the wider family of long-necked lutes known as Tanburs, a group of instruments historically distributed from Iran and Mesopotamia across Central Asia and Anatolia.

Musicologists classify the saz as part of the tanbur family of long-necked lutes.

Within this broader organological tradition, the modern saz developed in Anatolia as the principal folk lute of Turkish folk music and became closely associated with the repertoire of itinerant poet-musicians known as âşıks.

== Name ==
According to The New Grove Dictionary of Music and Musicians, "the terms 'bağlama' and 'saz' are used somewhat interchangeably in Turkey. 'Saz' is generally used interchangeably with 'enstrüman' (instrument) and it is used to refer single or group of musical instruments like 'üflemeli sazlar' (wind instruments).

Historically, the name bağlama referred to smaller-sized saz instruments, now generally identified with the name üçtelli cura. In some Alevi musical traditions, however, the instrument developed into a larger form now known as the dede sazı. The name bağlama itself has been hypothesized to derive from the alevi tradition of deste bağlama."Bağlama Kelimesinin Kökeni Ve Tarihsel Süreçteki Gelişimi".

Larger saz instruments were known by other names such as: bozuk, tambura, and, in certain historical contexts, çöğür. The latter appears in Ottoman paintings alongside the classical tanbur. Depictions show the çöğür sharing a similar form with the classical tanbur, but utilizing a different string arrangement. The instrument is documented in having five or six strings with historical descriptions noting that the outer courses used thin steel strings while the middle course used brass strings.

The tuning named çöğür is documented with a three-course tuning of A3 · (A3–D3) · G3. The pitch difference within the middle course suggests that the second string added to this course was a thinner higher-pitched string a feature also observed in modern traditional saz tuning systems. "ÇÖĞÜR".

In everyday usage, the term bağlama generally refers to instruments associated with bağlama tuning, such as the kısa sap, dede sazı, and üçtelli, while saz and the other names mentioned above are used to refer to the larger, urban-style instruments. This distinction reflects historical naming conventions, Necdet Kurt cites İrfan Kurt's account of meeting several saz players in Konya, who reportedly stated, in translation: “We do not play the bağlama; we play the saz. The bağlama is played by the Bektashi.” .

However, this distinction has become less clear in scholarly contexts. as some argue that the term saz should not be used for the turkish folk lute, as it originally referred to musical instruments in general, and that bağlama is the appropriate name for the entire instrument family. This has led to the invention of additional names, such as dede sazı and balta sazı, to distinguish instruments with different sizes and tunings.

== Bağlama scale ==
The musical scale of the saz differs from that of many western instruments — such as the guitar — in that it features ratios that are close to quarter tones. The traditional ratios for saz frets are listed by Yalçın Tura:

- Fret 1: 18/17
- Fret 2: 12/11
- Fret 3: 9/8
- Fret 4: 81/68
- Fret 5: 27/22
- Fret 6: 81/64
- Fret 7: 4/3
- Fret 8: 24/17
- Fret 9: 16/11
- Fret 10: 3/2
- Fret 11: 27/17
- Fret 12: 18/11
- Fret 13: 27/16
- Fret 14: 16/9
- Fret 15: 32/17
- Fret 16: 64/33
- Fret 17: 2/1

However, as confirmed by Okan Öztürk, instrument makers now often set frets on the saz with the aid of fret calculators and tuners based on the 24-tone equal temperament. The frets include the 12 tones within 12-tone equal temperament, along with 5 more. This means that 12 tone songs can be played on the saz.

== Tunings ==
The Turkish saz has a variety of tunings (düzen), associated with different regional traditions. The list below presents some of the most common tunings and their commonly used names. String order is given as Bottom, Middle, Top.

Tunings are defined relative to a reference system in which the bottom string is presumed to be A and then the other notes are derived accordingly. The instrument then may be transposed to a different absolute pitch level.

The most common bağlama tunings
When the specific octave of the notes in a tuning is not clear and is not attested anywhere, an example is omitted. The reason for this is explained in the notes section of the Abdal tuning.

Abdal Tuning
A, A, G (Tonic: A) — e.g., A3 · A3 · G3
Variant 2: A3 · A2 · G3
Note: Originally, the middle course should be in the same octave as the bottom course. Due to these tunings not being consistently notated with octave designations, this tuning is sometimes listed with the entire middle course assumed to be in a lower octave than the bottom course. The most popular performers who used this tuning had an octave string tuned an octave lower alongside another string in the same octave. However, in Azerbaijan, this tuning is performed with the middle course tuned to the same octave, and sometimes an additional octave string is added, resulting in the middle course having three strings. Playing in this tuning is also referred to as açıktan çalma, and the Azerbaijani name for this tuning reflects this, as it is called açıq kök.
Variant 3: A3 · (A3 – A2) · G3

Acemaşiran Tuning
A, A, F (Tonic: F) — Most likely A3 · A3 · F3

Bağlama Tuning
A, D, E (Tonic: E) — e.g., A3 · D3 · E3

Bozuk (Kara) Tuning
A, D, G (Tonic: A) — e.g., A3 · D3 · G3
Variant 2: (A3 – A3) · (D4 – D3) · (G3 – G3)
Variant 3: (A3 – A3 – A2) · (D3 – D3) · (G3 – G2)
Variant 4: (A3 – A3 – A2) · (D3 – D3) · (G3 – G3 – G2)
Variant 5: (A3 – A3 – A2) · (D4 – D3 – D3) · (G3 – G3 – G2)
Variant 6 (Variant created recently): (A3 – A3 – A2) · (D2 – D3) · (G3 – G2)
Variant 7 A3 · D3 · G3 · G4
Variant featuring an ahenk teli, an additional higher-pitched octave string with its tuning peg mounted on the side of the neck. In Turkey, this feature survives mainly on some üçtelli (three-string) smaller sized sazs and their various tunings, while the Bosnian šargija retains it on larger instruments.
Variant 8 (cintelli): A3 · D3 · G3 · D4
Variant featuring a cin teli, unlike the ahenk teli it's peg isn't mounted on the side of the neck
Variant 9 (çögür): A3 · (A3 – D3) · G3 : Note: Abdal tuning is called çögür by the abdal people

Çargah Tuning
A, D, G (Tonic: B) — e.g., A3 · D3 · G3
Note: This tuning is also listed as A, D, C.

Eviç Tuning
A, B, G (Tonic: B) — e.g., A3 · B3 · G3
Variant 2: A3 · B2 · G3
Note: This tuning has the same situation as the Abdal tuning.
In Azerbaijan, there are two additional variants:
Variant 3: A3 · (B3 – E3) · G3
Variant 4: A3 · (B3 – B2) · G3
Note: The first variant is most likely the original one, as Variants 3 and 4 appear to be derived from it.

Hüseyni Tuning
A, A, E (Tonic: A) — Most likely A3 · A3 · E3

Hüzzam Tuning
A, A, F♯ (Tonic: F♯) — Most likely A3 · A3 · F♯3

Kayseri Tuning
A, E, A (Tonic: A) — e.g., A3 · E3 · A3
Variant 2: A3 · E2 · A3
Note: This tuning has the same situation as the Abdal tuning. It is also called Tar tuning; because of this, the second variant may be the more authentic one.

Kütahya Tuning
A, D, D (Tonic: D) — e.g., A3 · D3 · D3
Note: Also listed as A3 · A3 · D3. These variations appear to be a carryover from the instrument üçtelli, and the first variant is listed as Zeybek düzeni.

Misket Tuning
A, D, F♯ (Tonic: F♯) — e.g., A3 · D3 · F♯3

Müstezat Tuning (Fa Müstezat)
A, D, F (Tonic: F) — e.g., A3 · D3 · F3
Variant 2 (Do Müstezat): A3 · C4 · G3
Variant 3: A3 · C3 · G3
Note: This variant has the same situation as the Abdal tuning. In Azerbaijan, there are two additional variants:
Variant 4: A3 · (C4 – C3) · G3
Variant 5: A3 · (C4 – F3) · G3
Note: The first variant of Do Müstezat is most likely the original one, as Variants 4 and 5 are derived from it.

Rast Tuning
A, C, G (Tonic: C)
Note: This is the same tuning as Do Müstezat.

Sabahi Tuning
A, C, A (Tonic: A) — e.g., A3 · C4 · A3

Segah Tuning
A, D, B (Tonic: B)
Note: Also listed as A, B, G (the same as the Eviç tuning). It is also called Azeri tuning; the A, D, B variant appears to be an outlier.

Şur Tuning
A, E, B (Tonic: A)

Ümmi Tuning
A, A, D (Tonic: A) — e.g., A3 · A3 · D4
Note: Also listed as A3 · A2 · D3. This has the same situation as the Abdal tuning.

Yeksani (Irızva) Tuning
A, D, A (Tonic: A)
Note: Also listed as A, D, E (the same as the Bağlama tuning). There are two variants: A3 · D3 · A3 and A3 · D4 · A3. due to the name also being used for the Bağlama tuning, the first variant is likely to be the original one.

Zirgüle Tuning
A, F, G (Tonic: G) — e.g., A3 · F3 · G3
Note: In Azerbaijan, this tuning system is called Çoban bayatı kökü.

== Notable performers ==
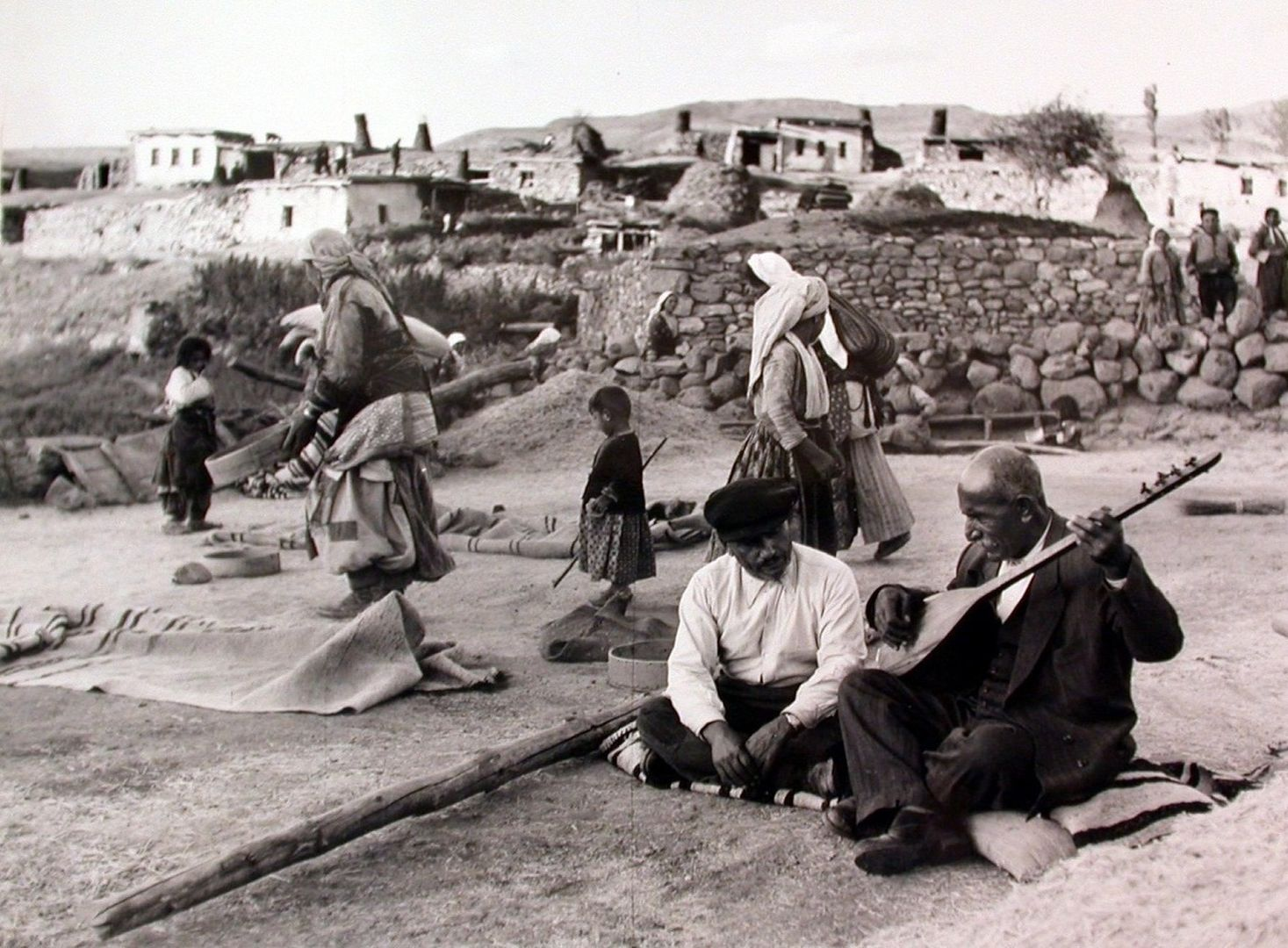
Asik Veysel (seated right, wearing suit) was a bağlama virtuoso, and the prominent representative of the Anatolian ashik tradition in the 20th century.

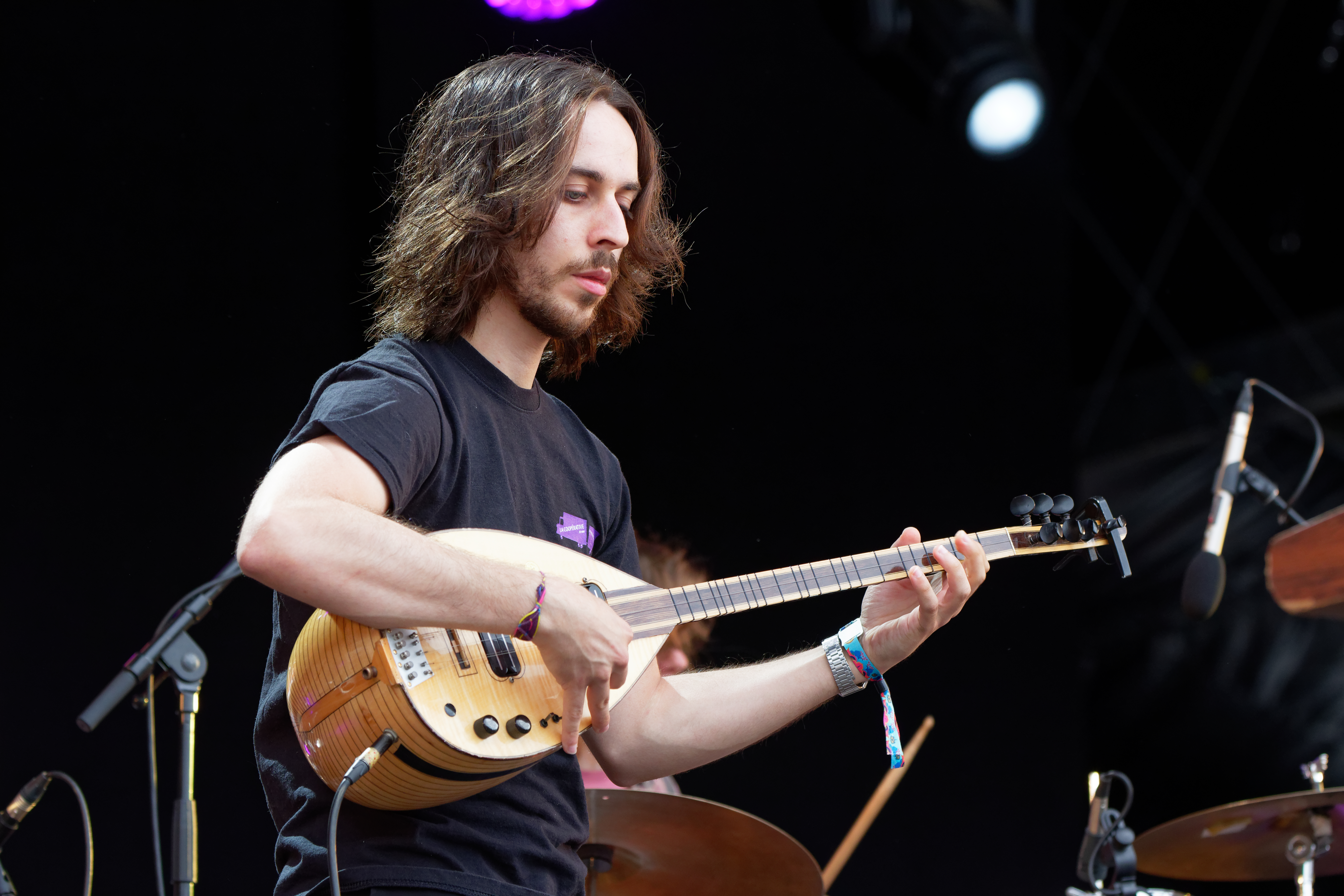
Erdinç Ecevit Yıldız from the band Altın Gün performs with an electric bağlama.

- Aşık Veysel (1894–1973)
- Muharrem Ertaş (1913–1984)
- Neşet Ertaş (1938–2012)
- Ali Ekber Çiçek (1935–2006)
- Musa Eroğlu (1945–)
- Orhan Gencebay (1944–)
- İbrahim Tatlıses (1952–)
- Mahsun Kırmızıgül (1969–)
- Arif Sağ (1946–)
- Nida Tüfekçi (1929–1993)
- Orhan Ölmez (1985–)
- Ozan Hilmi Şahballı (1953–)
- Yusuf Polatoğlu (1956–2021)
- Azer Bülbül (1967–2012)
- Erkin Koray (1941–2023)
- Hasret Gültekin (1971–1993)
- İbrahim Erkal (1967–2017)
- Aşık Mahzuni Şerif (1940–2002)
- Ankaralı Namık (1976–2015)
- Ankaralı Turgut (1963–2024)
- Ahmet Koç (1968–)
- Oğuz Yılmaz (1969–2021)
- Nuray Hafiftaş (1964–2018)
- Fatih Kısaparmak (1961–)
- Arif Şirin (1949–2019)
- Uğur Işılak (1971–)
- Yavuz Bingöl (1964–)
- Ferdi Tayfur (1945–2025)
- Müslüm Gürses (1953–2013)
- Hakan Taşıyan (1973–)
- Esat Kabaklı (1954–)
- Orhan Hakalmaz (1965–)
- Ahmet Kaya (1957–2000)
- Onur Şan (1981–)
- Sümer Ezgü (1960–)
- Kıvırcık Ali (1968–2011)
- Aşık Murat Çobanoğlu (1940–2005)
- Aşık Sefai (1956–)
- Özlem Özdil (1979–)
- Şahin Kendirci (2002–)
- Aşık Şahsenem Bacı (1945–2022)
- Güler Duman (1967–)
- Cahit Berkay (1946–)

== See also ==
- Alevism
- Art of Azerbaijani Ashiqs
- Baglamas
- Bouzouki (Greece)
- Buzuq (Lebanon & Syria)
- Çiftelia
- Dombra
- Dutar
- Innaby, Azerbaijani dance
- Komuz
- Music of Turkey
- Sallaneh (lute)
- Šargija
- Setar
- Tambura (instrument)
- Tanbur
