= Turkish folk music =

Tradition-based music originating in Turkey

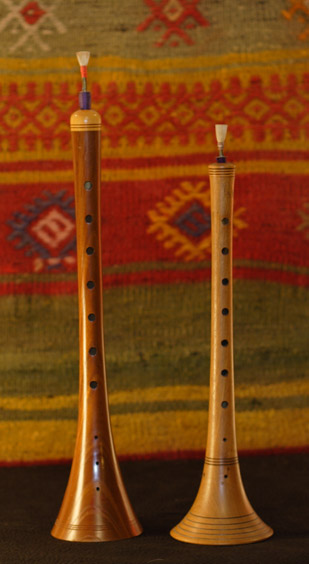
Zurna

Turkish folk music (Turkish: Türk Halk Müziği) is the traditional music of Turkish people living in Turkey influenced by the cultures of Anatolia and former territories in Europe and Asia. Its unique structure includes regional differences under one umbrella. It includes popular music from the Ottoman Empire era. After the foundation of the Republic of Turkey in 1923, Turkish President Mustafa Kemal Atatürk ordered a wide-scale classification and archiving of samples of Turkish folk music from around the country, which, from 1924 to 1953 collected more than 10,000 folk songs. Traditional folk music was combined with Western harmony and musical notation to create a more modern style of popular Turkish music.

== History and development ==
Western music had begun to influence Ottoman music from before the early Tanzimat period. According to Degirmenci "the first westernization movement in music happened in the Army; in 1826 Giuseppe Donizetti, brother of the famous opera composer Gaetano, was invited to head the military band of Nizam-i Cedid (the Army of the New Order), which was founded by Selim III." Sultan Abdulhamit II was said to prefer Western music, saying "To tell the truth, I am not especially fond of alaturka music. It makes you sleepy, and I prefer alafranga music, in particular the operas and operettas." Music in the Ottoman period is often classified into the music of the palace (Classical Turkish Art Music, which became Turkish Art Music in the Republic), local traditional or rural music, and the music of religious orders, called tekke music. All the old Ottoman musical institutions and religious institutions were closed down at the start of the Republic period.

Turkish nationalist intellectual Ziya Gokalp "stressed the importance of collecting folksongs to create a national music culture and indeed he engaged in the activity of collecting folksongs in Diyarbakir and carried out ethnographic research among Arabs, Kurdish, and Turkish tribes and hoped to establish a small museum of ethnography there." According to Gokalp, "our national music... is to be born of a synthesis of our folk music and Western music. Our folk music provides us with a rich treasure of melodies. By collecting and arranging them on a basis of Western techniques, we shall have built a national and modern music."

The Ministry of Education established the Bureau of Culture in 1920, which began to collect folk songs, around a hundred of which were published as Yurdumuzun Nagmeleri (Melodies of our Country) in 1926. Hungarian composer Béla Bartók was also invited to help collect folk songs in Turkey, 2000 of which were published between 1925 and 1935. A group of composers including Adnan Saygun and Ulvi Cemal who had been sent to study abroad on state scholarships, "took part in full-scale expeditions for the collection of folk music that were organized and sponsored by the Istanbul Municipal Conservatory (Istanbul Belediye Konservatuvari) between 1926 and 1929, and by the Ankara State Conservatory (Ankara Devlet Konservatuvarl) between 1936 and 1952".

Turkish 'folk music' was not a unified form of music until the state construction of the early Turkish Republic. Degirmenci has noted that "the history or the reconstruction of Turkish folk music reflects political aspects of the formation of the nation-state and Turkish nationalism." The foundation of the Turkish Republic also saw attempts to collect folkloric stories, and to create a more unified and pure Turkish language by removing many Persian and Arabic words to construct a vocabulary supposedly closer to that of ordinary people.

In 1937, a Turkish state radio was established and the dissemination of Turkish folk music became a priority for those in charge. Musicians were recruited by Muzaffer Sarisozen, "who acted as a talent scout, hand-picking regional performers who displayed exceptional talent."

In the 1960s, musicians like Aşık Veysel, Neşet Ertaş, Bedia Akartürk became popular folk artists. In the 1970s and 1980s, with the rising popularity of arabesque and Turkish light western, Turkish folk music lost some ground, but singers like Belkıs Akkale, İzzet Altınmeşe, Selda Bağcan, Güler Duman, and Arif Sağ made hit songs and became important representatives of the genre. By the late 1980s, proponents of a Kemalist-inspired Turkish folk music began to worry that the "Ataturk's "musical revolution" had not been entirely successful. Its failure could be demonstrated by the fact that the cultural vacuum in Turkish society alluded to by Gokalp had been filled not with the proposed new national fusion music, but with the hated arabesk, a genre that embodied the ideals and aesthetic of a predominantly foreign Eastern element."

== Türkü ==
Türkü, literally "of the Turk", is a name given to Turkish folk songs as opposed to şarkı. In contemporary usage, the meanings of the words türkü and şarkı have shifted: Türkü refers to folk songs originated from music traditions within Turkey whereas şarkı refers to all other songs, including foreign music.

Classically, Türküs can be grouped into two categories according to their melodies:

- Kırık havalar: These have regularly rhythmic melodies. Following subtypes belong to this category: deyiş, koşma, semah, tatyan, barana, zeybek, horon, halay, bar, bengi, sallama, güvende, oyun havası, karşılama, ağırlama, peşrev, teke zortlatması, gakgili havası, dımıdan, zil havası, fingil havası.
- Uzun havalar: These have non-rhythmic or irregularly rhythmic melodies. The following subtypes belong to this category: barak, bozlak, gurbet havası, yas havası, tecnis, boğaz havası, elagözlü, maya, hoyrat, divan, yol havası, yayla havası, mugam, gazel, uzun hava (is used for the ones which don't fit into any other subtype)

== Varieties of style, scales, and rhythm ==
Music accompanied by words can be classified under the following headings: Türkü (folksongs), Koşma (free-form folk songs about love or nature), Semai (folk song in Semai poetic form), Mani (a traditional Turkish quatrain form), Dastan (epic), Deyiş (speech), Uzun Hava (long melody), Bozlak (a folk song form), Ağıt (a lament), Hoyrat, Maya (a variety of Turkish folksong), Boğaz Havası (throat tune), Teke Zortlatması, Ninni (lullaby), Tekerleme (a playful form in folk narrative), etc. These are divided into free-forms or improvisations with no obligatory metrical or rhythmic form, known as "Uzun Hava", and those that have a set metrical or rhythmic structure, known as "Kırık Havalar" (broken melodies). Both can also be employed at the same time.

Music generally played without words, and dance tunes, go by the names Halay, Bengi, Karsilamas, Zeybek, Horon, Bar, etc. Each region in Turkey has its own special folk dances and costumes.

Here are some of the most popular:

- Hora - A type of circle dance.
- Horon - This dance is from Black Sea region, was performed by men only living in Trabzon, dressed in black with silver trimmings. Today, the dancers link arms and quiver to the vibrations of the kemenche (an instrument similar to violin).
- Kasap Havası/Hasapiko -
- Kaşık Oyunu - The Spoon Dance is performed from Konya to Silifke and consists of gaily dressed male and female dancers 'clicking' out the dance rhythm with a pair of wooden spoons in each hand.
- Kılıç Kalkan - The Sword and Shield Dance of Bursa represents the Ottoman conquest of the city. It is performed by men only, in Ottoman battle-dress, who dance to the sound of clashing swords and shields, without music.
- Zeybek - In this Aegean dance, dancers, called "efe", symbolize courage and heroism.

=== Time signatures ===
A wide variety of time signatures are used in Turkish folk music. In addition to simple ones such as 2/4, 4/4 and 3/4, others such as 5/8, 7/8, 9/8, 7/4, and 5/4 are common. Combinations of several basic rhythms often results in longer, complex rhythms that fit into time signatures such as 8/8, 10/8, and 12/8.

== Instruments ==
=== Stringed instruments ===
Plucked stringed instruments include the saz, a family of long-necked lutes including the guitar-sized bağlama (the most common) and the smaller cura and kanun, a type of box zither. Several regional traditions use bowed stringed instruments such as the kabak kemane (gourd fiddle) and the Black Sea Kemançe.

=== Wind instruments ===
Woodwind instruments, include the double-reed, shawm-like zurna, ney (duduk), the single reed, clarinet-like sipsi, the single-reed twin-piped çifte, the end-blown flutes kaval and ney, and the droneless bagpipe, the tulum. An old shepherd's instrument, made from an eagle's wing bone, was the çığırtma. Many of these are characteristic of specific regions.

=== Percussion instruments ===
Percussion instruments include drums – davul and nağara – the tambourine-like tef, a mini drum darbuka and kaşık (spoons).

== Uses of music ==
Melodies of differing types and styles have been created by the people in various spheres and stages of life, joyful or sad, from birth to death. Ashiks (Turkish Minstrels), accompanying themselves on the saz, played the most important role in the development and spread of Turkish folk music. Musicians did not use accompaniment with saz, because Turkish Traditional Music was monophonic. Musicians played the same melody of a song but, when musicians hit the middle and upper strings (these strings must be played without touching keyboard of saz) polyphony was used.

== Turkish folk musicians ==
"Çiftetelli"
An example of Istanbul folk music

Complete list: List of Turkish folk musicians.

- Alişan
- Ali Ekber Cicek
- Mahmut Tuncer
- Ahmet Kaya
- Âşık Veysel Şatıroğlu
- Barış Manço
- Dilber Ay
- Yıldız Tilbe
- Hakan Altun
- Cengiz Kurtoğlu
- İbrahim Erkal
- Birol Topaloğlu
- Erkan Oğur
- Katip Şadi
- Gökhan Birben
- Kazım Koyuncu
- Mahzuni Şerif
- Oğuz Yılmaz
- Ankaralı Namık
- Arif Şentürk
- Murat Göğebakan
- Cem Karaca
- Musa Eroğlu
- Erkin Koray
- Ersen ve Dadaşlar
- Neşet Ertaş
- Müslüm Gürses
- Orhan Gencebay
- Mahsun Kırmızıgül
- Nuray Hafiftaş
- Kubat
- Emrah
- İsmail Türüt
- Arif Şirin
- Ceylan
- Fatih Kısaparmak
- İbrahim Tatlıses
- Yavuz Bingöl
- Sinan Özen
- Zara
- Uğur Işılak

== See also ==
- List of anonymous Turkish folk songs
- Ottoman music

== Sources and external links ==
- Folk/Local Music at the Republic of Turkey Ministry of Culture and Tourism website
- Musical instruments of Turkey — AllAboutTurkey.com
- TIKA music
- TURKISH FOLK MUSIC played by Hungarian musicians
- Turkish Folk music songs archive
- Listen to Turkish Folk Music
