= Pir Sultan Abdal =

Alevi religious figure

Pir Sultan Abdal

Pir Sultan Abdal was a prominent Turkish poet and an important religious figure in Alevism of Turkmen origin, who is thought to have been born in the village of Banaz in present-day Sivas Province, Turkey. He is considered legendary among his followers. His life is reconstructed from folkloric sources, especially religious poems which are believed to have been composed by himself and transmitted by ashiks.

During the Ottoman–Persian Wars, he supported religious heterodoxy and the political subversion of Anatolia, and suffered execution by hanging as a consequence.

== See also ==
- Alevism

== Bibliography ==
- O'Connell, John M. (2013). "Pir Sultan Abdal". In Fleet, Kate; Krämer, Gudrun; Matringe, Denis; Nawas, John; Rowson, Everett (eds.). Encyclopaedia of Islam (3rd ed.). Brill Online. ISSN 1873-9830.
