= Sezen Aksu discography =

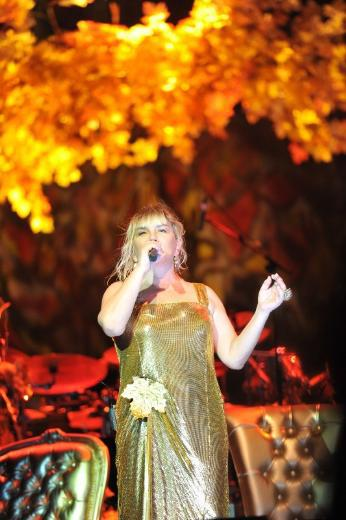
- Sezen Aksu performing live, 2012
- Studio albums: 25
- Extended plays: 9
- Soundtrack albums: +20
- Live albums: 1
- Singles: 8
- Music videos: 1

This article contains information about all releases by Turkish pop artist Sezen Aksu.

== Studio albums ==
List of studio albums, with selected sales figures and certifications
Title	Album details	Certifications	Sales
Allahaısmarladık	Released: October 3, 1977; Label: Hop; Format: LP		
Serçe	Released: August 21, 1978; Label: Kent; Format: LP		
Sevgilerimle	Released: August 26, 1980; Label: Kervan; Formats: LP, cassette		
Ağlamak Güzeldir	Released: April 20, 1981; Label: Kervan; Formats: LP, cassette		
Firuze	Released: July 2, 1982; Label: Kervan; Formats: LP, cassette		
Sen Ağlama	Released: September 6, 1984; Label: Sembol; Formats: LP, cassette		
Git	Released: September 2, 1986; Label: Fono; Formats: LP, cassette		
Sezen Aksu '88	Released: February 22, 1988; Label: Fono; Format: Cassette		
Sezen Aksu Söylüyor	Released: July 7, 1989; Label: Fono; Formats: CD, cassette		Turkey: 1,650,000
Gülümse	Released: July 16, 1991; Labels: Coşkun, Sahibinin Sesi; Formats: CD, cassette		Turkey:3,000,000
Deli Kızın Türküsü	Released: September 17, 1993; Label: Tempa Foneks; Formats: CD, cassette		Turkey: 700,000
Işık Doğudan Yükselir / Ex Oriente Lux	Released: June 28, 1995; Label: Tempa Foneks; Formats: CD, cassette		Turkey: 600,000
Düş Bahçeleri	Released: July 14, 1996; Labels: Karma, Raks; Formats: CD, cassette		Turkey: 520,000
Düğün ve Cenaze	Released: December 22, 1997; Label: Raks; Formats: CD, cassette		Turkey: 230,000
Adı Bende Saklı	Released: December 20, 1998; Labels: Polygram Plaza, Karma; Format: CD		Turkey: 700,000
Deliveren	Released: June 2, 2000; Label: Post; Formats: CD, cassette		
Şarkı Söylemek Lazım	Released: May 8, 2002; Label: DMC; Formats: CD, cassette	Mü-Yap: Diamond	Turkey: 500,000
Yaz Bitmeden	Released: August 6, 2003; Label: DMC; Formats: CD, cassette	Mü-YAP: Diamond	Turkey: 300,000+
Bahane	Released: February 10, 2005; Label: DMC; Formats: CD, cassette	Mü-YAP: Diamond	Turkey: 421,000
Deniz Yıldızı	Released: June 18, 2008; Label: DMC; Formats: CD, cassette	Mü-YAP: Gold	Turkey: 192,500
Yürüyorum Düş Bahçeleri'nde...	Released: June 5, 2009; Label: DMC; Formats: CD, cassette	Mü-YAP: Gold	Turkey: 100,000
Öptüm	Released: May 26, 2011; Label: SN; Format: CD	Mü-YAP: Gold	Turkey: 152,000
Biraz Pop Biraz Sezen	Released: January 18, 2017; Label: SN; Formats: CD, LP, digital download		
Demo	Released: December 4, 2018; Label: SN; Formats: CD, digital download		
Demo 2	Released: November 11, 2022; Label: SN; Formats: LP, digital download		
Paşa Gönül Şarkıları	Released: June 27, 2025; Label: Universal Music; Formats: LP, digital download		
Biz de Yeniden Başlarız	Released: April 17, 2026; Label: Universal Music; Formats: Digital download		

=== Remixes ===
Year	Title	Track list	Sales
2005	Bahane/Remixes	Şanıma İnanma (Kıvanch K); Yanmışım (Kıvanch K); İkili Delilik (DJ U.F.U.K, DJ Met, Genco Arı); Tebdil-i Mekan (Sharp Boys); Perişanım Şimdi (Miracleworkz, Murat Uncuoğlu, Aytekin Kurt); Kalp Unutmaz (Cervus); Hükümsüz (Kıvanch K); Eskidendi (DJ U.F.U.K, DJ Met, Genco Arı); Yanmışım (Mercan Dede); İkili Delilik (Kıvanch K, Cem Oyalı); Perişanım Şimdi (DJ U.F.U.K, DJ Met, Genco Arı); Şanıma İnanma (DJ Tongun, DJ Sai); Kalp Unutmaz (DJ Tongun, DJ Sai); Eskidendi (Kıvanch K, Cem Oyalı); Yanmışım (Miracleworkz, Murat Uncuoğlu, Aytekin Kurt); Perişanım Şimdi (Kıvanch K, Cem Oyalı); Kınalı Kuzum (Mercan Dede)	
2011	Öptüm Remix	"Ah Felek Yordun Beni" (Kivanch K. Remix); "Vay" (Okay Barış Remix); "Unuttun Mu Beni" (Kivanch K. & Erdinç Erdoğdu Radio Edit); "Ballı" (Enver Günen Mix); "Ayar" (Emrah Karaduman Mix); "Acıtmışım Canını Sevdikçe" (Emrah Karaduman Mix); "Sayım" (Bayraşa Mix); "Kaçırıcam Seni…" (Bahadır Tanrıvermiş Mix); "Arkadaş Şarkısını Duyunca" (Emrah Karaduman Mix); "Ah Felek Yordun Beni" (Okay Barış Versiyon); "Vay" (Emrah Karaduman Mix); "Unuttun Mu Beni?" (Kivanch K. Remake); "Ballı" (Düğün Dernek Apache, Kivanch K. Remix); "Acıtmışım Canını Sevdikçe" (Kivanch K. & Emre Aşkın Remix); "Sayım" (Melisa Uzunarslan Remix); "Ayar" (Kivanch K., Emre Aşkın Remix)	
2017	Biraz Pop Biraz Sezen Remix	"Canımsın Sen" (Volga Tamöz Remix); "Manifesto" (Kıvanch K. Remix); "İhanetten Geri Kalan" (Okay Barış Remix); "Hu Hu" (Aytuğ Yargıç & Emre Aşkın Remix); "Üfle De Söneyim" (Bayraşa Remix); "Hakkımda Konuşmuşsun" (Ali Tolga Demirtaş Remix); "İsyancı" (Bayraşa Remix); "Köz" (Bayraşa Rework); "Baba Evi" (Ali Tolga Demirtaş Remix); "Ey Benim Çocukluğum" (DigiHead Remix); "Günaydın Memur Bey" (Ora & Ventus Remix); "Manifesto" (Tarık Ceran Remix); "İhanetten Geri Kalan" (Armageddon Turk Mix); "Koca Kıçlı" (Genco Arı Remix); "Üfle De Söneyim" (Okay Barış Remix); "Hu Hu" (İlker Bayraktar Remix); "İhanetten Geri Kalan" (Öğünç Başara Remix); "Canımsın Sen" (Kıvanch K. Remix)	

=== Live ===
Year	Title	Track list	Sales
2012	Türkiye Şarkıları (Songs of Turkey)	Gülümse (Live); Bindokuzyüzkırkbeş / Bir Çocuk Sevdim (Live); Ne Ağlarsın (Live); Dansöz Dünya (Live); Leha Dodi (feat. Los Paşaros Sefaradis Musevi Müzik Topluluğu) [Live]; La Romansa de Rika Kuriel (feat. Los Paşaros Sefaradis Musevi Müzik Topluluğu) [Live]; Bastoniko de Djevezli / Âmed Nesim-i Subh-Dem (feat. Los Paşaros Sefaradis Musevi Müzik Topluluğu) [Live]; İstanbul (Live); Sen Ağlama (Live); Git / Geri Dön / Beni Unutma (Live); Ne Kavgam Bitti Ne Sevdam (Live); Mia Pista Apo Fosforo / Her Şeyi Yak (feat. Oniro Rum Müzik Grubu) [Live]; Ah Bir Ataş Ver / İzmir'in Kavakları (feat. Oniro Rum Müzik Grubu) [Live]; Çamlığın Başında Tüter Bir Tütün (Live); Sto Pa Kai Sto Xanaleo (feat. Oniro Rum Müzik Grubu) [Live]; Strose To Stroma Su (feat. Oniro Rum Müzik Grubu) [Live]; To Diko Mu Paploma / Çekin Uşaklar Çekin (feat. Oniro Rum Müzik Grubu & Cihan Okan) [Live]; Yerevan-Erebuni (feat. Feriköy Vartanant Ermeni Kilise Korosu) [Live]; Gomidas (feat. Feriköy Vartanant Ermeni Kilise Korosu) [Live]; Sari Gyalin (feat. Feriköy Vartanant Ermeni Kilise Korosu) [Live]; Bûkê (feat. Diyarbakır Büyükşehir Belediyesi Çocuk Korosu) [Live]; Ağlama Yar Ağlama (feat. Diyarbakır Büyükşehir Belediyesi Çocuk Korosu) [Live]; Yara Min (feat. Diyarbakır Büyükşehir Belediyesi Çocuk Korosu) [Live]; Lo Berde (feat. Diyarbakır Büyükşehir Belediyesi Çocuk Korosu) [Live]; Dua / Segâh Salât-ı Ümmiye / Segâh Teşrik Tekbiri / Evcârâ Saz Semaîsi / Rast Kar-ı Muhteşem (feat. Enderun Klasik Türk Müziği Topluluğu) [Live]; Batan Gün Kana Benziyor (feat. Enderun Klasik Türk Müziği Topluluğu) [Live]; Aksaray'dan Geçer İken Çevirdiler Yolumu (feat. Enderun Klasik Türk Müziği Topluluğu) [Live]; Keskin Bıçak (Live); Rakkas (Live); Şarkı Söylemek Lazım (Live); Yeniliğe Doğru / Arkadaş (feat. Feriköy Vartanant Ermeni Kilise Korosu, Los Paşaros Sefaradis Musevi Müzik Topluluğu, Oniro Rum Müzik Grubu, Enderun Klasik Türk Müziği Topluluğu & Diyarbakır Büyükşehir Belediyesi Çocuk Korosu) [Live]	

== Extended plays ==
List of EPs
Title	Extended play details	Sales
Kardelen	Released: September 10, 2005; Label: SN; Format: CD	Turkey: 350,000

== Singles ==
List of singles, with selected certifications, showing year released and album name
Title	Year	Sales	Album
"Haydi Şansım" / "Gel Bana"	1975		Non-album singles
"Kusura Bakma" / "Yaşanmamış Yıllar"	1976		Non-album singles
"Olmaz Olsun" / "Seni Gidi Vurdumduymaz"	1976		Allahaısmarladık
"Allahaısmarladık" / "Kaç Yıl Geçti Aradan"	1977		A-side on Allahaısmarladık B-side on Serçe
"Kaybolan Yıllar" / "Neye Yarar"	1977		Serçe
"Gölge Etme" / "Aşk"	1978		Serçe
"İlk Gün Gibi" / "Yalancı"	1979		Non-album single
"Allah Aşkına" / "Sensiz İçime Sinmiyor"	1979		A-side non-album single B-side on Serçe
"Heyamola" (with Ali Kocatepe and Coşkun Demir)	1983		Non-album single
"Küçük Bir Aşk Masalı" (with Özdemir Erdoğan)	1985		İkinci Bahar
"Hadi Bakalim"	1992		Gülümse
"Cumartesi Türküsü"	1996		Non-album single
"Erkekler"	1998	10,000	Düğün ve Cenaze
"Sari Odalar"	1999		Deliveren

=== MC & CD / Digital ===
Year	Title	Track list	Sales
2001	Remix Maxi Single Concert promo - not commercially released songs from album Deliveren (Crazygiver)	Kahpe Kader Full Vox Mix (Foul Fate); Oh Oh Full Vox Mix; Kahpe Kader Club Mix; Oh Oh Club Mix	
2006	Tempo with Hepsi		
2014	Yeni ve Yeni Kalanlar (New and New Leftovers)	"Yeni ve Yeni Kalanlar"; "Yeni ve Yeni Kalanlar (Alaturka Version)"; "Yeni ve Yeni Kalanlar (Emrah Karaduman Mix)"; "Yeni ve Yeni Kalanlar (Emrah Karaduman Club Remix)"; "Yeni ve Yeni Kalanlar (Moguz & Barış K. Rework)"	
2015	Çaya Güzelleme (Eksik Olma)		
2018	Geçmişe Susmasını Söyle (Tell the Past to Stop) with Nuri Harun Ateş		
2020	Yetinmeyi Bilir Misin? (Do You Know How to Settle?)		
2020	Ben De Yoluma Giderim (I'll Go My Way Too)		
2020	Ne Yapayım Şimdi Ben? (What Should I Do Now?)		
2020	Kaybedenler (Losers)		
2020	Konduramadım (Couldn't Attribute It to You) with Okay Barış		
2020	Karşıyım (I'm Against It)		
2020	Kendimce (By Myself)		
2020	Sen Ciddisin (You're Serious)		
2021	İnsanlık Hali (Human Nature)		
2021	Affet (Forgive)		
2021	Hakim Bey (feat. Kardeş Türküler & Ara Dinkjian) (Your Honour)		
2021	Hakim Bey (Kivanch K. Rearrange) (Your Honour)		
2021	Deli Divane (Crazy Admirer)		
2021	Onursuz Olabilir Aşk (Love Can Be Dishonourable)		
2021	Yandı İçim (I Got Burned)		
2021	Belki de Aşk Lazım Değildir (Maybe Love Isn't Necessary)		
2022	Ninni (Lullaby)		
2022	Her Şeye Rağmen (Despite Everything)		
2022	Yavrucanım (İyilikle Büyüsün) (feat. Sertab Erener) (My Baby (Grow Up With Kindness))		
2022	Rütbe (Rank)		

=== Soundtrack appearances ===
- "Hadi Bakalım" in Cemetery Man (1994)
- "Propaganda Cues" in Propaganda (1999)
- "İkinci Bahar" in İkinci Bahar (2000)
- "Karşı Pencere" and "Şarkı Söylemek Lazım" in La finestra di fronte (Facing Windows) (2003)
- "Eğreti Gelin" in Eğreti Gelin (2004)
- "Her Şeyi Yak" in Offside (2005)
- "Hayat Sana Teşekkür Ederim" in Sacred Heart (2005)
- "İstanbul Hatırası" in Crossing the Bridge: The Sound of Istanbul (2005)
- "40" in 40 (2009)
- "Kutlama" in Mine Vaganti (Loose Cannons) (2010)
- "Yol Arkadaşım" in Die Fremde (When We Leave) (2010)
- "Muhabbet Kuşları" in Mahpeyker (2010)
- "La Sella Della Prima," "Tenna," "Sude," "Gitmem Daha," and "Unuttun mu Beni?" in Magnifica Presenza (2012)
- "İstanbul Yokmuş Bundan Başka" in Turkish TV series Kayıp Şehir (2013)
- "Vay", "Olmaz Olsun" in Patron Mutlu Son İstiyor (2014)
- "Ben Öyle Birini Sevdim ki" (Delibal Original Soundtrack) (2016)
- "İhtimal Ki" (Cebimdeki Yabancı Original Soundtrack) (2018)
- "Veda" (Kürk Mantolu Madonna Original Theatre Soundtrack) (2018)

== Guest appearances ==
List of non-single guest appearances, with other performing artists, showing year released and album name
Title	Year	Other artist(s)	Album
"Sürgün"	1989	Zülfü Livaneli	Gökyüzü Herkesindir
"Belalım"	1989	Udo Lindenberg	Bunte Republik Deutschland
"Karaağaç"	1996	Levent Yüksel	Levent Yüksel'in 2. CD'si
"Sebahat Abla"	2006	Müslüm Gürses	Aşk Tesadüfleri Sever
"Gelsin Hayat Bildiği Gibi"	2006	Ceza	Yerli Plaka
"The Cure"	2009	India Arie	Testimony: Vol. 2, Love & Politics
"Akşam Güneşi"	2011	None	Orhan Gencebay ile Bir Ömür, Vol. 2
"Günlerimiz"	2016	None	Livaneli 50. Yıl "Bir Kuşaktan Bir Kuşağa
"Tanrı Misafiri"	2019	None	Kimler Geldi Kimler Geçti, Vol. 1
