= Onno Tunç =

- Born: Ohannes Tunçboyacıyan; 20 December 1948; Istanbul, Turkey
- Died: 14 January 1996 (aged 47) Armutlu, Turkey
- Genres: Pop
- Occupations: Composer, arranger, producer
- Instruments: Bass guitar, double bass, piano, keyboards, guitar
- Years active: 1965–1996

Ohannes Tunçboyacıyan, better known as Onno Tunç (20 December 1948 – 14 January 1996), was a leading Turkish musician of Armenian descent, working mainly as a composer, arranger and a music producer. Tunç also played bass guitar and occasionally double bass, contributing to the albums of several musicians. He was one of the prominent names of Turkish pop music in the 1980s and 1990s with his arrangements. He was the elder brother of musician Arto Tunçboyacıyan.

== Early years ==
Of Armenian descent, Onno Tunç was born in 1948 in Istanbul. His music experience started with the church choir of Harur Mangaz (Hundred students). In his first year of middle school, he had to drop out to go to work to support his family.

Born in a financially limited family, he could not afford a musical instrument although they fascinated him, until Anush ("Sweet" in Armenian), the mother of his friend Arman bought her son a guitar, and one for Onno too. Onno, a fast-learning autodidact, started a music band and soon repaid Anush.

== Career ==
He started music by singing in church choirs. He founded a music group called Black Stones in high school. In 1965, he started his professional music career as a bass guitarist with the Üstün Poyraz Set Orchestra. He started jazz music with Emin Fındıkoğlu's orchestra in 1967. In the following years, he increased his musical experience by working with the orchestras of Durul Gence and Süheyl Denizci. He made a name for himself with his arrangement in the 1970s. At that time, he contributed to the albums of many names including Özdemir Erdoğan, Nilüfer, Bülent Ortaçgil, Gülden Karaböcek, Ajda Pekkan, Nükhet Duru and Gökben. In 1973 he released his record "The Bracelet / Melissa". Söz Sevgilim Söz, one of Tunç's first compositions, whose lyrics was written by Çiğdem Talu, was voiced by Cömert Baykent. Many times he competed as a composer and arranger in the Eurovision Song Contest Turkey Finals. In 1978 and 1981, he represented Turkey in this contest as arranger and conductor.

Turkish pop icon Sezen Aksu met Onno Tunç and started taking lessons from Tunç after listening Nükhet Duru's song called "Seninle", which was composed by Tunç in 1981. Later, they started working together during Aksu's show at Şan Theater. After being the music director of Nilüfer'84 album, he worked only with Sezen Aksu and her orchestra for many years. The composition and arrangement of many songs written by Sezen Aksu and Aysel Gürel from the album Sen Ağlama in 1984 to the album Gülümse in 1991 was directed by Onno Tunç. The album, Sen Ağlama, triggered the rise of Turkish pop music and led to the emergence of pop music as a strong rival to Turkish Arabesque music that was monopolized in the period.

In the 90's, he was the music director of the albums by Aşkın Nur Yengi, Bülent Ortaçgil, Harun Kolçak, Nilüfer, Zerrin Özer, Zuhal Olcay and Ayşegül Aldinç. The songs composed or arranged by Tunç also took place in the albums of Asya, Yeşim Salkım, Bendeniz, Emel Müftüoğlu and Rüya Ersavcı. Before his death, he contributed to the albums of Sezen Aksu's Düş Bahçeleri and the last songs of Levent Yüksel.

He also composed the soundtracks for films such as “Ah Belinda”, “Rumuz Goncagül” etc. Besides his pop music compositions, he has a piece called "Su" for solo saxophone and orchestra. He played bass guitar in Bülent Ortaçgil's Will You Play With Me ?, Okay Temiz's Zikir, Nükhet Ruacan's Ruacan albums, MFÖ's Yalnızlık Omur Boyu and Mustafa Sandal's Beni Aglatma.

He composed 175 songs and represented Turkey in many European music contests. A very close friend of Turkish singer Sezen Aksu, he co-wrote and composed many of the songs she performed throughout her career, as well as arranging all of her albums. It was widely known that his death tipped Sezen Aksu into depression. She dedicated her album Düş Bahçeleri to Onno (and numerous songs on virtually all of her albums since).

His symphony Su was performed by the Istanbul Symphony Orchestra.

He collaborated with Hulki Aktunç and Dağhan Baydur on the Turkish entry Sevince at the Eurovision Song Contest 1978, which was performed by Nilüfer and Nazar.

In the 80's, he had a relationship with singer-songwriter Sezen Aksu that was both romantic and professional. As a couple they put their signatures to works that broke new ground in Turkish pop music, such as Sen Ağlama (Don't Cry), Git (Go), Sezen Aksu'88 and Sezen Aksu Söylüyor (Sezen Aksu Sings). Sezen's music matured in the 90's, when she co-produced her best selling album to-date Gülümse (Smile) with Onno. The A-1 track from the album called Hadi Bakalım (Come On Now) was a hit in Turkey and Europe, and was published as a single in Germany. It was to be later rediscovered in Europop by singer Loona as Rhythm of the Night. She also began to produce albums for her vocalists, notably producing Aşkın Nur Yengi's debut album Sevgiliye (To a Lover) again with Tunç. She was to repeat her success with artists Erener and Yüksel also.

Onno's younger brother Arto Tunçboyacıyan worked with him musically for 25 years. Arto is highly inspired by his brother, having dedicated numerous songs to him (and the mountain that caused Onno's accident) and an album "Onno" (1996), together with Ara Dinkjian. On performances, you can often read the letters O N N O on Arto's clothing.

== Death ==
Onno Tunç died on 14 January 1996, when his private plane he was piloting crashed in bad weather on a mountain at Tazdağ near Selimiye village of Armutlu, Yalova on his journey from Bursa to Istanbul. Hasan Kanık, his friend aboard also died in the accident. Two amateur Turkish mountaineers who came from Istanbul to search for him were also found dead 6 days later because of hypothermia. Onno Tunç is buried in Şişli Armenian Catholic Cemetery in İstanbul. He was survived by two daughters Selin and Ayda from his first wife, Canan Ateş who was the first Turkish female athlete to swim a marathon.

In 2002, a monument was erected in his memory at the crash site and in the city center of Yalova. The monument to the composer of Armenian origin was subjected to numerous acts of vandalism over the course of the years. In 2012 Yalova City Hall completely disassembled the monument as the city council decided that the old monument was not aesthetic enough for such a valued composer, particularly in its vandalized state. A more artistic bronze (Tunç in Turkish) monument in the abstract shape of a G-clef was constructed as a replacement.

=== Onno Tunç tribute ===
In 1996 his former lover and partner in music Sezen Aksu released a compilation album called “Düş Bahçeleri” as a tribute to honor his contributions to the Turkish music industry.

In 2007, several renowned Turkish singers and pop groups came together and released a compilation album Onno Tunç Şarkıları ("Onno Tunç Songs").

== Some of his songs ==
- Ah Mazi
- Alev Alev (Ayşegül Aldinç-Alev Alev-1994)
- Ayrılık (Zuhal Olcay-Oyuncu-1993)
- Ayrılıklar Bitmez (Sezen Aksu - Firuze) - 1982
- Bana Ellerini Ver (Harun Kolçak-Beni Affet-1990)
- Ben Yoldan Gönüllü Çıktım (Yeşim Salkım-Hiç Keyfim Yok-1994)
- Beni Bırakın (Levent Yüksel-Med Cezir-1993)
- Beni Unutma
- Bir Başka Aşk
- Bir Çocuk Sevdim
- Bu Gece
- Değer mi
- Deli Gönlüm
- Demek ki Öyle (lyrics: Ülkü Aker, Ayşe Mine - 1978)
- Dokun Bana (Nilüfer-Yine Yeni Yeniden-1992)
- Düet (Zuhal Olcay-Oyuncu-1993)
- Dünden Sonra Yarından Önce (Zuhal Olcay)
- Eğrisi Doğrusu (Nilüfer-Ne Masal Ne Rüya-1994)
- Geçer (lyrics:Sezen Aksu-1988)
- Geri Dön
- Gir Kanıma (Harun Kolçak-Beni Affet-1990)
- Git
- Gözlerin Bulutlu (Nükhet Duru -1981)
- Güzel Şeyler Söyle (Aşkın Nur Yengi&Harun Kolçak-Eurovision Turkey Finals 1987)
- Hadi Bakalım
- Haydi Gel Benimle Ol
- Hep Bana (Zerrin Özer-Olay Olay-1992)
- Hoşgörü
- İyisin (Zuhal Olcay-Oyuncu-1993)
- Kapında Güllerim (Bendeniz II - 1995)
- Kavaklar
- Kış Masalı
- Kızmayın Bana (Neco, lyrics: Mehmet Teoman - 1975)
- Kolay Değil
- Müptelayım Sana (Harun Kolçak-Beni Affet-1990)
- Ne Masal Ne Rüya (Nilüfer-Ne Masal Ne Rüya-1994)
- Ne Kavgam Bitti Ne Sevdam (Sezen Aksu-Gülümse-1991)
- Olay Olay (Zerrin Özer-Olay Olay-1992)
- Oldu mu?
- Oldu Olanlar (Serpil Barlas, lyrics: Zeren, 1976)
- Olsun Varsın (Nilüfer-Ne Masal Ne Rüya-1994)
- Oyuncu (Zuhal Olcay-Oyuncu-1993)
- Öyle Bakma (Fatih Erkoç-Eurovision Turkey Finals 1989) (Aşkın Nur Yengi-Sevgiliye-1990)
- Papatya Falı (Nükhet Duru - 1981)
- Ruhun Duymaz (Emel-Ruhun Duymaz-1995)
- Sen Ağlama
- Seni İstiyorum
- Seninle (Nükhet Duru - Nükhet Duru 81)
- Son Bakış
- Sonbahar
- Sultan Süleyman
- Şinanay
- Şiribim Şiribom (Gökben - Şiribim Şiribom/Ve Birgün Sen 45'lik(1976) ve Şiribim Şiribom-1977)
- Şov Yapma (Nilüfer-Yine Yeni Yeniden-1992)
- Tam Bana Göresin (Nilüfer-Ne Masal Ne Rüya-1994)
- Tango (Zuhal Olcay-Oyuncu-1993)
- Tenna
- Uçurtma Bayramları (Levent Yüksel-Med Cezir-1993)
- Uykun Olsam (Zuhal Olcay-Oyuncu-1993)
- Ünzile
- Vurulmuşum Sana (Asya-Asya-1994)
- Yeni Aşk (Zerrin Özer-Olay Olay-1992) (Yeşim Salkım-Hiç Keyfim Yok-1994)
- Yeniden Sev (Nilüfer-Yine Yeni Yeniden-1992) (Gipsy Kings-as "No Vivire" in Love and Liberté-1993)
- Yıllar (Harun Kolçak-Beni Affet-1990)
- Yoksun (Nilüfer-Ne Masal Ne Rüya-1994)
- Zorba (Nilüfer-Ne Masal Ne Rüya-1994)
- 1945

== Collaborations to albums ==
Year	Title/Artist	Task	Instrument played
1974	Benimle Oynar Mısın / Bülent Ortaçgil	Arrangements	Bass
1976	Aşk Dediğin Laftır / Gökben	Arrangements	
1977	Bir Nefes Gibi / Nükhet Duru	Arrangements	
1981	Nükhet Duru 1981 / Nükhet Duru	Producer, arrangements, orchestration	
1981	Ağlamak Güzeldir / Sezen Aksu	Co-producer, arrangements, songwriter	
1984	Nilüfer '84 / Nilüfer	Arrangements, songwriter	Bass, acoustic guitar, acoustic piano
1984	Sen Ağlama / Sezen Aksu	Producer, arrangements, songwriter	
1986	Git / Sezen Aksu	Co-producer, arrangements, songwriter	
1988	Sezen Aksu '88 / Sezen Aksu	Co-producer, arrangements, songwriter	Keyboards, synth, bass, double bass, acoustic guitar, cümbüş, vocals
1989	Sezen Aksu Söylüyor / Sezen aksu	Producer, arrangements, songwriter	Keyboards, synth, guitar, acoustic bass, tom-tom drums, vocals
1990	2. Perde / Bülent Ortaçgil	Co-producer, arrangements, programming, mixing	
1990	Sevgiliye / Aşkın Nur Yengi	Co-producer, arrangements, songwriter	Keyboards
1991	Gülümse / Sezen Aksu	Producer, arrangements, songwriter	Instruments
1991	Beni Affet / Harun Kolçak	Producer, arrangements, songwriter	
1992	Yine Yeni Yeniden / Nilüfer	Producer, arrangements, songwriter	Acoustic guitar
1992	Olay Olay / Zerrin Özer	Producer, arrangements, songwriter	
1993	Oyuncu / Zuhal Olcay	Producer, arrangements, songwriter	
1994	Ne Masal Ne Rüya / Nilüfer	Producer, arrangements, songwriter	
1996	Levent Yüksel'in 2.CD'si / Levent Yüksel	Co-producer, arrangements, songwriter	Keyboards

== Arrangements ==
- Bir Gün Mutlaka (Music: Mustafa Sandal) for the album (Zerrin Özer-Olay Olay-1992)
- Küçük Bir Aşk Masalı (Music: Ali Kocatepe)
- Vazgeçtim (Music: Ara Dinkjian)
- Dokunma Keyfine Yalan Dünyanın (Music: Aşık Mahzuni Şerif) (Gülden Karaböcek - Dokunma Keyfine Yalan Dünyanın - 1976)
- Kır Çiçekleri (Music: Ferdi Tayfur) (Gülden Karaböcek - Kır Çiçekleri - 1976)
- Dur Bırakma Beni "NonCe N'est Pas Fini" (Gülden Karaböcek - Dur Bırakma Beni - Vokal: Nilüfer, Füsun Önal - 1974 )
- Bambaşka Biri, Haykıracak Nefesim, Dile Kolay, Ya Sonra by Ajda Pekkan
- Melankoli, Cambaz, Benimsin Diyemediğim, Çakır by Nükhet Duru
