= Uzay Heparı =

- Born: Rony Uzay Heparı; 24 July 1969; Istanbul, Turkey
- Died: 31 May 1994 (aged 24) Bakırköy, Istanbul, Turkey
- Genres: Pop; dance
- Occupations: Musician, composer, producer, arranger, actor
- Instruments: Keyboard; davul; piano
- Years active: 1988–1994
- Spouse: Zeynep Tunuslu (m. 1993)

Rony Uzay Heparı (24 July 1969 – 31 May 1994) was a Turkish musician, composer, producer, arranger, and actor. Heparı received classical music training as a child. In the mid-1980s, during his high school years, he joined the Istanbul Gelişim Orchestra, conducted by Garo Mafyan, and developed his skills on the electric keyboard. Heparı, a fan of MFÖ in the 1980s, developed an interest in pop music. Having studied classical music throughout his childhood, he began to shift his style in his early teens. At 19, he began his career playing piano on Zuhal Olcay's album Küçük Bir Öykü (1988). At the same time, he was studying at the Istanbul Technical University Turkish Music State Conservatory.

Heparı rose to fame in the music world with his arrangements for numerous pop albums from the early 1990s onwards. Later, he joined Sezen Aksu's band. He contributed to some of the major albums of the period with his arrangements and compositions, such as Aşkın Nur Yengi's Hesap Ver (1991) and Sıramı Bekliyorum (1993), Sertab Erener's Sakin Ol! (1992) and Lâ'l (1994), Sezen Aksu's Deli Kızın Türküsü (1993), Levent Yüksel's Med Cezir (1993), and Demet Sağıroğlu's Kınalı Bebek (1994). He also appeared in music videos for several artists. In 1993, he made his acting debut with a leading role in the film Gece, Melek ve Bizim Çocuklar (1994), directed by Atıf Yılmaz.

On 20 May 1994, while working on Demet Sağıroğlu's first album, he crashed with his recently purchased motorcycle into the broken-down car of actress Demet Akbağ on his way to a show at the Küfe Bar on the Etiler Koç Bridge. He suffered a severe neck fracture and died on 31 May 1994, after spending 11 days in vegetative state at Istanbul International Hospital (now Acıbadem International Hospital). Heparı, despite dying at a young age, is known as one of the best arrangers in Turkish pop music history.

== Life and career ==
His mother was Eti Heparı, and his father was Yayla Heparı. Because he was born around the time Neil Armstrong first set foot on the Moon, he was given the name Uzay (meaning 'space' in Turkish). He spent his childhood in Nişantaşı and Yeşilköy. During these years, he had a keen ear for music. His parents worked tirelessly to help him become a good musician. However, Heparı could barely sit behind the piano and was struggling to get through his music lessons. After a few hours of lessons with his first music teacher, Ova Sünder, who was both his aunt and the director of the Istanbul University Conservatory at the time, he left home and went straight out into the streets. A few years later, he graduated from Nilüfer Hatun Elementary School. He then began his high school education at Saint Benoit French High School. He also studied music at the Kadıköy State Conservatory during this time. He spent his high school years wandering the streets of Karaköy. After three years of high school, he enrolled in the piano department at the Istanbul Technical University State Conservatory. He put aside his childhood mischievous behavior, making significant progress in music and becoming inseparable from the piano. Friendships within the music community also came into play, and with the conservatory, he embarked on a musical journey. While producing compositions, he also engaged in discussions with conservatory teachers about great classical composers like Johann Sebastian Bach and Frédéric Chopin. His unique demeanor earned him a reputation as a child prodigy during his university years.

With his strong sense of humor, he became a popular figure in his circle of friends. In the mid-1980s, he learned that a band including Sertab Erener and Levent Yüksel was looking for a keyboardist. He applied for the job, but was fired less than a week later after playing poorly at his first rehearsal. Heparı, who had been studying classical piano since childhood, was unaccustomed to playing the keyboard professionally, leading to his dismissal. Subsequent to his dismissal, he went to Garo Mafyan and joined the Istanbul Gelişim Orchestra, where Mafyan was the conductor. The orchestra's musicians both taught and motivated Heparı. In this orchestra, he developed his skills and mastered the electronic keyboard. A fan of the MFÖ, he developed an interest in pop music during this period. While playing at venues to earn money and make his way, he was discovered by Vedat Sakman.

Discovered by Vedat Sakman, Heparı took part in a studio recording with Vedat Sakman, Zuhal Olcay and Mehmet Teoman at the end of 1988, playing keyboards and piano for Zuhal Olcay's first album, Küçük Bir Öykü Bu (1989), when he was only nineteen years old. In 1991, he received an offer to play keyboards for Uğur Yücel's stage show Sezen Aksu & Uğur Yücel Show, which presented with Sezen Aksu. During these shows, Aksu noticed his talent. On the last day of 1991, the Sezen Aksu Orchestra gave a New Year's Eve concert broadcast on TRT 1. Aksu performed her hits from her album, Gülümse (1991). Sertab Erener also performed. Tuğba Özerk, then a child, performed the Azerbaijani folk song "Ayrılıq". Yıldız Tilbe made her debut at this concert.

Heparı later made the arrangements on Levent Yüksel's first album. Although it was Yüksel's first album, all the songs on it later became classics and the album achieved great success, being among the best albums of the 90s and Turkish pop history. The song "Gemiler" from Orhan Atasoy's first album, Yanmışız (1993), became a hit as well. The music video for "Gemiler", shot in a single take by Umur Turagay and featuring Cem Özer, Seyyal Taner, Fatih Erkoç, Zeynep Tunuslu, and Uzay Heparı, became the first Turkish music video to be shown on MTV. He met fashion designer Zeynep Tunuslu in November 1993 and they got married ten days after meeting.

Uzay Heparı died on 20 May 1994, following an eleven-day coma after a motorcycle accident. Consequently, he was unable to work on Yıldız Tilbe's first album. Sertab Erener and Demet Sağıroğlu's next albums were also left unfinished. Heparı's sudden death caused widespread mourning.

== Personality ==
Uzay Heparı had an ear for music as a child. When his family realized this, they wanted him to receive a musical education. Heparı, who took piano lessons as a child, would barely sit down at the piano during his primary school years and would quickly get up after lessons to run off into the streets. Heparı continued his piano and music studies in high school, and during his conservatory years, he became deeply involved in music, practicing long hours on the electric keyboard. He developed his skills both through his studies and by performing with orchestras as he transitioned from classical to pop music. Described by music masters as a child prodigy, Heparı was a beloved figure with a strong sense of humor.

While I'm a very down-to-earth person in real life, another side of me is also very adventurous. I anticipate each day with surprises, wondering, "What will I experience tomorrow?" I never make a plan, for example. I also enjoy living at night. The moment night falls, I start to recharge. It's been this way since childhood. I can't go to bed early; I have a general irresponsibility towards life. My only responsibilities are the piano and music. Not knowing what to do gives me a sense of freedom, and I enjoy it very much. I think about old age a lot. "Will I still have these excitements when I'm old?" I remember Attilâ İlhan saying, "Elderly people are essentially prisoners of death." That's why I want to experience everything.

== Acting career ==
In 1992, Uzay Heparı made his debut in the music video for the song "Sakin Ol!", which was a track on Sertab Erener's similarly titled debut album Sakin Ol!. The video also featured Sezen Aksu, Neslihan Yargıcı, Levent Yüksel, Süheyla Dura, and Mithat Can Özer. He then appeared in the music video for "Gemiler" from Orhan Atasoy's debut album Yanmışız (1993). The video, shot in a single take by Umur Turagay, also featured Cem Özer, Seyyal Taner, Fatih Erkoç, and Zeynep Tunuslu. The video also became the first Turkish music video to be shown on MTV. Heparı was offered the lead role in Atıf Yılmaz's Gece, Melek ve Bizim Çocuklar. The role was offered to him after Hüseyin Karşın, the lead actor, fell ill. Filming for the movie, starring Derya Arbaş, Deniz Türkali, and Uzay Heparı, began in November 1993. Dubbing was used for Heparı after filming, and the film was released on 1 April 1994.

== Personal life ==
In the second half of 1991, Heparı was dating Sezen Aksu. For a time, he and Aksu both dated and professionally collaborated on different projects. Yıldız Tilbe, Sezen Aksu's vocalist since 1991, and Heparı became involved some time in mid-1992. The following day, when Tilbe told Aksu about the incident, she kicked Tilbe out of her home and banned her from working as her vocalist. Despite this falling out with Aksu, Heparı continued to collaborate with her. Heparı, who had several short-lived relationships after this incident, met fashion designer Zeynep Tunuslu by chance at a bar called Şamdan in Etiler in late 1993. They married 10 days later. Actress Fatma Girik, then the mayor of Şişli, officiated the ceremony. After the main ceremony, the couple held a different wedding ceremony at the Taksim Municipality Nightclub. Heparı died in a motorcycle accident the day after learning he was becoming a father. Zeynep Tunuslu, who was pregnant at the time of his death, gave birth to their son, Uzay Kanat Heparı, on 5 January 1995.

== Death ==
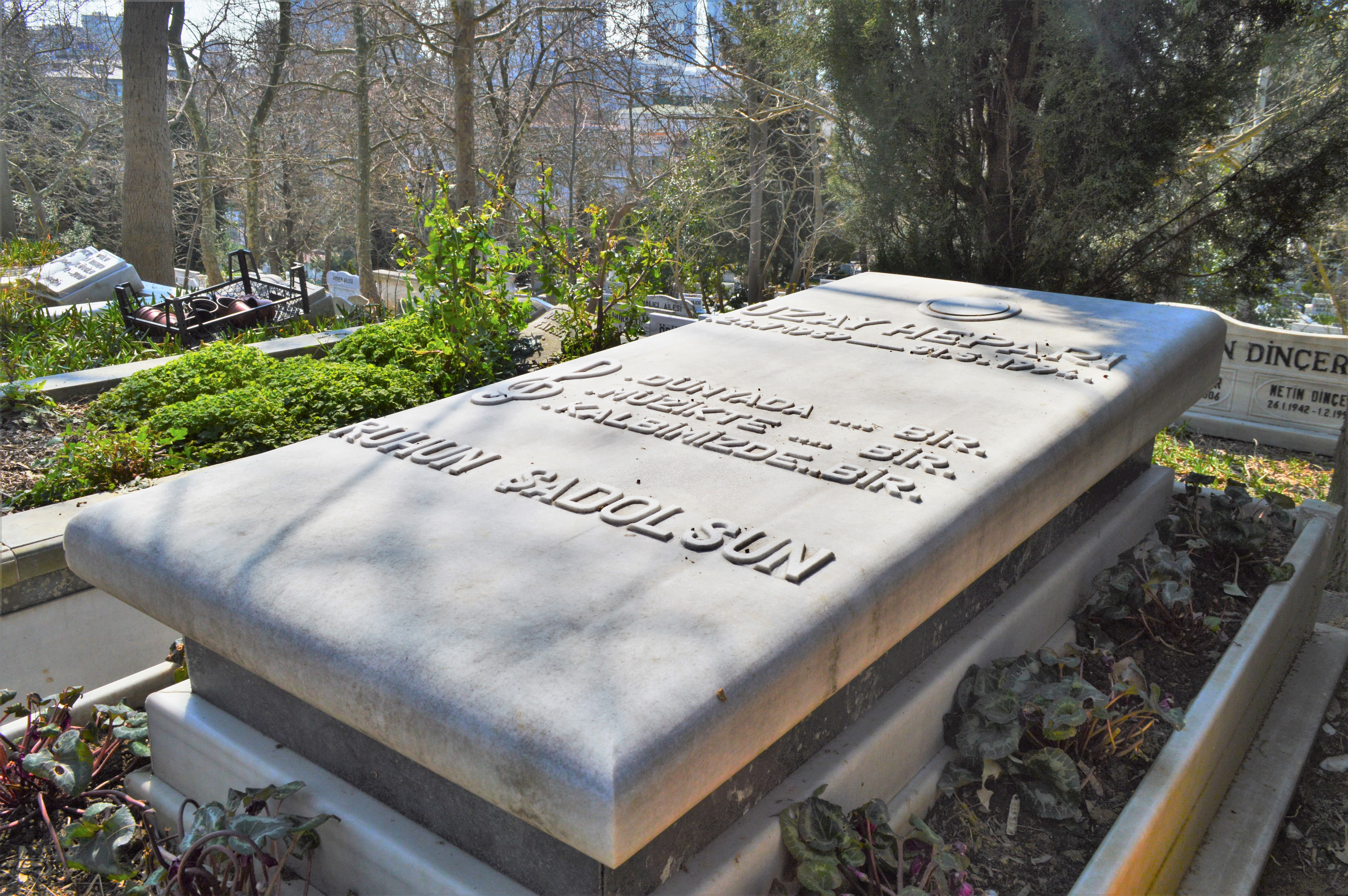
Heparı's grave at Zincirlikuyu Cemetery, Istanbul

On 20 May 1994, while working on Demet Sağıroğlu's first album, he crashed into Demet Akbağ's broken car on his recently purchased motorcycle on the Etiler Koç Bridge, on his way to a show at the Küfe Bar, and was seriously injured, breaking his neck. After 11 days in a vegetative state at Istanbul International Hospital in Bakırköy, Istanbul, he died at 10:50 am on 31 May 1994. His body was moved from the Teşvikiye Mosque on 1 June and buried in Zincirlikuyu Cemetery.

In 1996, Zeynep Tunuslu published her book, Mavi..., Melekler ve Sen, in which she told the story of her meeting with Heparı, their marriage, the days she spent in the hospital after his accident, and the period leading up to the birth of their son Uzay Kanat Heparı.

== Works ==
- Zuhal Olcay – Küçük Bir Öykü Bu (1989)
- Zuhal Olcay – İki Çift Laf (1990)
- Akrep Nalan – Dağ Çiçeği (1991)
- Aşkın Nur Yengi – Hesap Ver (1991)
- Mehmet Teoman – Ter İçinde (1991)
- Erol Evgin – Erol Evgin İle Yeniden (1991)
- Sertab Erener – Sakin Ol! (1992)
- Sezen Aksu – Deli Kızın Türküsü (1993)
- Levent Yüksel – Med Cezir (1993)
- Aşkın Nur Yengi – Sıramı Bekliyorum (1993)
- Nükhet Duru – Nükhet Duru (1994)
- Sertab Erener – La'l (1994)
- Demet Sağıroğlu – Kınalı Bebek (1994)

== Filmography ==
- Gece, Melek ve Bizim Çocuklar (1992)
