= Ara Dinkjian =

Armenian-American musician

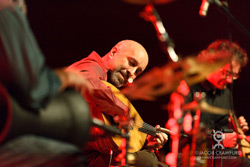
- Dinkjian in 2011

Background information
- Born: 18 June 1958 (age 68)
- Origin: New Jersey, United States
- Genres: Folk, Armenian folk
- Occupations: Musician, songwriter, performer
- Instruments: Oud, guitar, cümbüş, mandolin, kanun, saz, kaval
- Years active: 1986–present
- Labels: RCA/BMG, PolyGram/Universal, Traditional Crossroads
- Member of: Night Ark

Ara Dinkjian (Armenian: Արա Տինքճեան; born June 18, 1958) is an Armenian-American musician. He is the founder of the band Night Ark. Dinkjian is an oud player. His compositions, which have been recorded in thirteen different languages, include the multi-platinum hit Dinata which was performed in the closing ceremonies of the 2004 Olympic Games in Athens.

Dinkjian has written songs for Eleftheria Arvanitaki, and Sezen Aksu ("Vazgeçtim", "Sarışın", "Yine Mi Çiçek", "Hoş Geldin", among others). Turkish singers Gülşen, Kibariye, Mine Koşan, Ahmet Kaya, Coşkun Sabah, Burcu Güneş have recorded his songs.

== Early life ==
Born in New Jersey to Armenian parents originating from Diyarbakir, Turkey. Dinkjian made his professional debut at age five playing on the doumbag at the 1964 New York World's Fair, where he accompanied John Berberian and George Mgrdichian. His earliest professional musical experience was accompanying his father Onnik Dinkjian, a renowned singer of Armenian folk music and liturgical chants. He received a scholarship to the University of Hartford Hartt School, where he studied several western and eastern instruments, including piano, guitar, and darbuka. He graduated in 1980, becoming the first person in the United States to earn a specialized degree in the oud.

== Career ==
Dinkjian formed an instrumental quartet, Night Ark, which recorded four CDs for RCA/BMG and Universal/PolyGram. Members included Arto Tunçboyacıyan on the percussion as well as pianist/composer Armen Donelian and Marc Johnson. He is accompanied by Zohar Fresco on percussion and Adi Rennert on keyboards.

In 2002 Dinkjian was chosen to represent Armenia in the First International Meeting Of The Oud, where twelve of the world’s top oud players gathered in Thessaloniki, Greece for three days of solo concerts, master classes, and exchange of information.

His CDs An Armenian In America, Voice Of Armenians, and Peace On Earth were recorded live at the 2005, 2006, and 2007 Jerusalem International Oud Festivals. At the 2008 Jerusalem International Oud Festival, he recorded an album with Sokratis Sinopoulos – lyra (Greece), Tamer Pinarbasi – kanun (Turkey), Rimon Haddad – bass (Israel) and Zohar Fresco – percussion (Israel), and named it Peace on Earth.

Dinkjian released a solo oud recording, Conversations With Manol (2013), as well as Finding Songs (2013), which features 12 new compositions performed by the Ara Dinkjian Quartet. Other releases include Diyarbekiri Hokin (Armenian for The Soul of Diyarbekir) which is a collaboration with his father Onnik, as well as 1915–2015 Truth & Hope, commemorating the 100 year anniversary of the Armenian genocide.

Dinkjian has collaborated with kanunist Tamer Pınarbaşı and clarinetist Ismail Lumanovski in chamber-music style arrangements of ethnic folk, pop, classical, jazz, and original compositions. Collectively known as The Secret Trio, they released their first CD, Soundscapes, in 2012 and their second, Three Of Us, in 2015.

== Discography ==
=== Night Ark ===
- 1986 - Picture, RCA/Novus
- 1988 - Moments, RCA/Novus
- 1998 - In Wonderland, PolyGram
- 2000 - Petals on your Path, EmArcy
- 2000 - Treasures, Traditional Crossroads

=== Ara Dinkjian - solo and with friends ===
- 1995 Gypsy Fire, Traditional Crossroads
- 1996 Tears of Dignity, Libra Music
- 1996 Onno 1948 - 1996, D. Stove Music
- 2006 An Armenian In America, Krikor Music
- 2008 Peace on Earth, Krikor Music
- 2012 Sounscapes, Traditional Crossroads
- 2013 Finding Songs, Krikor Music
- 2013 Conversations with Manol, Kalan Music
- 2015 Three of Us, with Secret Trio, Kalan Music
- 2015 1915-2015 Hakikat Umut / Truth Hope, Kalan Music
