= Gülümse =

Studio album by Sezen Aksu
- Released: 16 July 1991
- Recorded: January–June 1991
- Studio: FT Studio; Gelişim Studio; (Istanbul, Turkey)
- Genre: Pop; dance; disco
- Length: 45:33
- Label: Coşkun; Sahibinin Sesi
- Producer: Kudret Çoşkun, Onno Tunç

Sezen Aksu chronology
Sezen Aksu Söylüyor (1989)	Gülümse (1991)	Deli Kızın Türküsü (1993)

Gülümse is Sezen Aksu's Turkish release and her most commercially successful album in Turkey. The album sold more than 2 million and is one of the best-selling Turkish album. Sezen Aksu on this album again worked with Onno Tunç and Aysel Gürel.

== Track listing ==
No.	Title	Writer(s)	Composer(s)	Length
1.	"Hadi Bakalım"	Aysel Gürel	Onno Tunç	4:56
2.	"Tutsak"	Ece Aksoy; Ersin Salman; Onat Kutlar; Sezen Aksu; Onno Tunç	Onno Tunç	6:28
3.	"Ne Kavgam Bitti Ne Sevdam"	Aysel Gürel	Onno Tunç	3:28
4.	"Gülümse"	Kemal Burkay	Arto Tunçboyacıyan	5:03
5.	"Güllerim Soldu"	Sezen Aksu	Sezen Aksu	4:31
6.	"Vazgeçtim"	Sezen Aksu	Ara Dinkjian	5:09
7.	"Her Şeyi Yak"	Sezen Aksu	Thanos Mikroutsikos	5:14
8.	"Namus"	Ümit Yaşar Oğuzcan	Arto Tunçboyacıyan	3:56
9.	"Seni Kimler Aldı?"	Sezen Aksu	Sezen Aksu	3:28
10.	"Değer mi?"	Aysel Gürel	Onno Tunç	3:25
Total length:				45:33

== Personnel ==
- Kudret Coşkun: Executive-producer
- Onno Tunç: Producer, all instruments and arrangements, except for the following (1,2,3,4,5,6,8,10)
- Aykut Gürel - Sound engineer
- Duyal Karagözoğlu - Sound engineer
- Curtis Schwartz - Mixing
- Sertab Erener - Vocal (1,7)
- Levent Yüksel - Vocal (1,7)
- Seden Gurel - Vocal (1,7)
- Arto Tunçboyacıyan - Supervisor, percussion instruments (2,3,4,5,8) Vocal (2,3,4,8)
- Ahmet Kadri Rizeli - kemenche (4)
- Tamer Pınarbaşı - Kanun (4)
- Ara Dinkjian - Ud (6)
- Celal Bağlan: darbuka (7)
- Seyfi Hayta: Def (7)
- Serdar Erbaşı: Hollo, Bendir (7)
- Reyhan Dinletir: Bongo (7)
- İlyas Tetik: Violin (7)
- Ergin Kızılay: Ud (7)
- Atilla Özdemiroğlu - Instruments and arrangements (7)
- Sevingül Bahadır: Vocal (7)
- Ercan Irmak: Ney, Kavala (9)
- Özkan Uğur - Bass Guitar (9)
- Fuat Güner - Acoustic Guitars, Musical Instruments and regulations (9)
- Orhan Topçuoğlu - Percussion instruments (10)

== Charts ==
=== All-time charts ===
Chart	Position
Hürriyet Turkey's Best 100 Albums	5
