= Treasures (Night Ark album) =

Studio album by Night Ark
- Released: June 20, 2000
- Genre: Jazz
- Label: Traditional Crossroads
- Producer: Harold Hagopian

Night Ark chronology
Petals on your Path (2000)	Treasures (2000)

Professional ratings
Review scores
Source	Rating
SoundStage!	4/5 stars

Treasures is a compilation album by the band Night Ark released on June 20, 2000, and comprising compositions taken from the first two albums: Picture (1986) and Moments (1988).

== Track listing ==
1. "Picture"
2. "Homecoming"
3. "Trilogy: Part I – Birth"
4. "Moments"
5. "Adolescence"
6. "Of Song & Silence"
7. "Offering"
8. "Worm"

all tracks composed and arranged by Ara Dinkjian, except track 06 by Ara Dinkjian and Sid Clark

== Personnel ==
- Ara Dinkjian: cumbus (01,02,07), saz (02,07), mandolin (03), guitar (04,05), ud (04,06,08), kanun (04), piano (05), voice (05), kaval (07)
- Arto Tuncboyaciyan: bendir (01,02,07), voice (01,03,04,06), percussion (02,03,04,06,07,08), lead voice (05), congas (06,08)
- Armen Donelian: synthesizer (04,05,07), piano (04)
- Shamira Shahinian: synthesizer (01,02,08), voice (01), piano (06), keyboards
- Ed Schuller: bass (01,02,03,05,06,07,08), voice (01)
- Recording engineer: David Baker
- Mastering engineer: Bob Ludwig
