= Onnik Dinkjian =

Armenian-American musician and singer

Onnik Dinkjian (Armenian: Օննիկ Տինքճեան; born 1929) is a French-born American-Armenian musician and singer. He is the father of Ara Dinkjian and has appeared with his son as well as other Armenian musicians such as Roupen Altiparmakian playing oud.

== Biography ==
He was born Jean-Joseph Miliyan in Paris, France, in 1929, the son of Garabed and Zorah from Dikranagerd (Diyarbakir), who both fled the Armenian genocide. He had a sister two years older. His father died when Jean-Joseph was less than one year old.

He and his sister were adopted by his godparents, Nishan and Oghida Dinkjian, who were also from Dikranagerd, and continued to live in Paris. He grew up fluent in French and Armenian.

His interest in music began when he was 10 and began attending an Armenian church in Paris. "I absolutely fell in love with the music," he said. "This is what brought me into the Armenian Church, not necessarily as a religious person but as a lover of the Armenian music."

At the age of 17, in July 1946, He and his family moved to the United States, where Nishan Dinkjian’s two sisters lived. Onnik entered the U.S. with his given name, and later changed it legally to Onnik Dinkjian after his adoptive parents.

In 1952, Dinkjian was drafted into the U.S. Army. In Germany he was assigned to the Winged Victory Chorus, a well-known group led by Joe Baris that performed a wide range of choral works, from composers including Puccini, Debussy, Rodgers and Hammerstein, and Irving Berlin. "For a year and a half in Germany all I did was travel from one city to another with some famous American stars, like Eddie Fischer and Danny Kaye, all because of the music, my singing."

When he returned from the army, Onnik opened a dry cleaning store and married Araksi Maksian (Mghsian) from Lyon, France, whose roots were in Kharpert. They had two children, Anahid and Ara.

He received a 2020 National Heritage Fellowship from the National Endowment for the Arts, which is the United States government's highest honor in the folk and traditional arts.

== Discography ==
- Voice of Armenians Onnik Dinkjian - with the song "Mayrus" (text by A. Issahakian and music by Badalian)
- The Many Sides Of Onnik 1992 a rare recording of songs in Tigranakert dialect
- Inner Feelings of Onnik, album featuring Ne me quitte pas recorded by Onnik Dinkjian with John Berberian (oud)
- All My Best
