= Night Ark =

American instrumental band

- Genres: New-age
- Years active: 1983–present
- Labels: Traditional Crossroads
- Members: Ara Dinkjian; Armen Donelian; Arto Tunçboyacıyan; Marc Johnson

Night Ark is an instrumental quartet formed in 1986. The members are American-Armenian Ara Dinkjian, Turkish Armenian Arto Tunçboyacıyan, American-Armenian Armen Donelian and American Marc Johnson. The quartet's most famous piece is the instrumental "Homecoming". Another famous variation on the piece is Dinata, which is set to Greek lyrics, first sung by Eleftheria Arvanitaki. Homecoming was also the theme for the satirical Israeli television series HaHamishiya HaKamerit ("The Chamber Quintet").

In November 2010, the Night Ark performed a reunion show in the Jerusalem Oud Festival.

== Discography ==
- 1986: Picture, RCA/Novus
- 1988: Moments, RCA/Novus
- 1997: In Wonderland, PolyGram
- 2000: Petals on Your Path, EmArcy
- 2000: Treasures (compilation), Traditional Crossroads
