= Every Day Is a New Life =

Every Day is a New Life

Studio album by Arto Tunçboyacıyan
- Released: October 3, 2000
- Genre: Avant-garde, folk
- Length: 57:56
- Label: Living Music
- Producer: Arto Tunçboyacıyan

Arto Tunçboyacıyan chronology
Night Ark, Petals on your Path (2000)	Every Day is a New Life (2000)	Aile Muhabbeti (2001)

Professional ratings
Review scores
Source	Rating
Rambles	(not rated)

Every Day is a New Life is an album by Arto Tunçboyacıyan released in 2000 under the Living Music label.

== Track listing ==
1. "Broken Arm" - 7:08
2. "Take My Pain Away" - 6:20
3. "Thank God I Wake Up Again" - 4:58
4. "I Miss You Every Moment My Brother" - 6:53
5. "Mystical Pine Tree" - 2:22
6. "Wooden Leg Grandpa" - 5:55
7. "Simple Message" - 3:18
8. "After the Game" - 4:30
9. "Dear My Friend Onno" - 5:44
10. "Baby Elephant" - 4:21
11. "Heaven for My Father" - 6:27

== Personnel ==
- Joanie Madden - whistle (human)
- Arto Tunçboyacıyan - percussion, arranger, main performer, producer, sazabo, duduk, vocals
- Dixon VanWinkle - tuba, associate producer, mastering, mixing, engineer
- Paul Winter - consort sax (soprano), executive producer
- Jim Butler - production assistant
- Randy Weyant - design
- Eugene Friesen - cello
- Peter Herbert - bass
- Marvin Stamm - trumpet
