= Love Is Not in Your Mind =

Love is Not In Your Mind

Studio album by Arto Tunçboyacıyan
- Released: 2005
- Genre: Avant-garde, folk
- Label: Svota Music / Heaven and Earth

Arto Tunçboyacıyan chronology
Artostan (2005)	Love is Not In Your Mind (2005)

Love is Not In Your Mind is an album by Arto Tunçboyacıyan and Vahagn Hayrapetyan released in 2005.

== Track listing ==
1. "Don't Fight Against Nature"
2. "April 24"
3. "How can I Say Goodbye to You"
4. "Jangire Jungarna"
5. "Dancing with the Devil"
6. "Street Walk"
7. "New Flower"
8. "Other Side of the River"
9. "One Moment of Silence"
10. "Black Water"
11. "Love is Not In Your Mind"
12. "Welcome Boo Boo"

== Personnel ==
- Arto Tunçboyacıyan – vocals, percussion, duduk, sazabo, bular
- Vahagn Hayrapetyan – keyboards
