= Ağlamak Güzeldir =

1981 album by Sezen Aksu

Studio album by Sezen Aksu
- Released: April 20, 1981
- Recorded: 1980–1981
- Studio: İstanbul Ses Kayıt, Istanbul, Turkey
- Genre: Folk-pop; dance-pop; art pop; funk
- Length: 37:57
- Label: Kervan

Sezen Aksu chronology
Sevgilerimle (1980)	Ağlamak Güzeldir (1981)	Firuze (1982)

Ağlamak Güzeldir (Turkish pronunciation: [ɑːɫɑmɑk ɟyzældir]; transl. It's beautiful to cry) is the fourth studio album by Turkish singer Sezen Aksu. It was released on April 20, 1981, by Kervan Plakçılık. It was her first album to be officially released both on cassette and LP, as her previous three albums were solely released on LP. The cassette version included five songs from her previous studio album, Sevgilerimle.

"Yak Bir Sigara" is a duet with fellow singer Özdemir Erdoğan.

== Track listing ==
Credits adapted from the album's liner notes.

Ağlamak Güzeldir — LP Version
No.	Title	Lyrics	Music	Arrangement	Length
1.	"Düşünce"	Sezen Aksu	Attila Özdemiroğlu	Attila Özdemiroğlu	3:57
2.	"Ağlamak Güzeldir"	Sezen Aksu	Sezen Aksu	Attila Özdemiroğlu	2:46
3.	"Yak Bir Sigara" (with Özdemir Erdoğan)	Özdemir Erdoğan	Özdemir Erdoğan	Attila Özdemiroğlu	4:02
4.	"Köprü"	Sezen Aksu	Attila Özdemiroğlu	Attila Özdemiroğlu	3:12
5.	"Yalnız Kullar (Tanrım)"	Sevgi Sanlı	Attila Özdemiroğlu	Attila Özdemiroğlu	3:43
6.	"En Uzun Gece"	Aysel Gürel	Attila Özdemiroğlu	Attila Özdemiroğlu	4:03
7.	"Biliyorsun"	Sezen Aksu	Sezen Aksu	Attila Özdemiroğlu	5:16
8.	"Ben Her Bahar Aşık Olurum"	Aysel Gürel	Selmi Andak	Attila Özdemiroğlu	3:47
9.	"Lunapark"	Aysel Gürel	Attila Özdemiroğlu	Onno Tunç	3:51
10.	"Hoşgörü"	Aysel Gürel	Onno Tunç	Onno Tunç	3:17
Total length:					37:57

== Personnel ==
Credits adapted from the album's liner notes.

=== Musicians ===
- Sezen Aksu – lead vocals, lyrics (tracks 1–2, 4, 7), music (tracks 2, 7)
- Özdemir Erdoğan – lead vocals (track 3), lyrics (track 3), music (track 3)
- Sevgi Sanlı – lyrics (track 5)
- Aysel Gürel – lyrics (tracks 6, 8–10)
- Attila Özdemiroğlu – music (tracks 1, 4–6, 9), arrangement (tracks 1–8)
- Selmi Andak – music (track 8)
- Onno Tunç – music (track 10), arrangement (tracks 9–10)

=== Technical ===
- İhsan Apça – recording
- Bülent Engez – cover art graphics
- Moris Maçoro – photography
