= List of victims of anti-LGBTQ hate crimes in Turkey =

The following is a list of victims of anti-LGBTQ hate crimes in Turkey. For decades, there have been reports of murders and crimes targeted towards LGBT (lesbian, gay, bisexual and transgender) people in Turkey. In general, homophobia is considered to be common across the country. As a result, numerous homicide victims are LGBT people who get murdered due to hate crimes.

== Notable cases covered in the media ==
Between 2002 and 2013, at least 70 transgender, transvestite and transsexual people were murdered in Turkey due to hate crimes.

=== Çetin Çalık ===
Çetin Çalık, a 28-year-old engineer who lives in Beşiktaş apart from his family, was tortured and stabbed to death several times after coming to the house from a gay bar with a gay partner.

=== Petro Melikşahoğlu ===
29-year-old transvestite Petro Melikşahoğlu was attacked in Harbiye, Şişli, by a group of men from Eskişehir on 16 February 2001, who attempted to force him into sexual intercourse, but upon his refusal Melikşahoğlu was killed and extorted. The murderers were later arrested.

=== Ekrem Yılmaz ===
Ekrem Yılmaz, a 49-year-old retired worker, was killed on 27 August 1999 by young men he had an affair with at home, but his murderers were never found.

=== Ahmet Yıldız ===
Ahmet Yıldız was killed by his father in Üsküdar, Istanbul, on 15 July 2008 while he was running away. His murder is the first known case of honor killing of gay people in Turkey.

=== Engin Temel ===
Engin Temel, a 24-year-old gay worker in Love Point, a gay bar in Istanbul, was killed on 8 December 2008 outside his house in Şişli. Following the murder, 467 people were questioned, including a number of businessmen, but the case was not solved.

=== İrem Okan ===
"'They could not find a place for my child anywhere in the whole world...'

Can any sentence be so concise, deep and painful? This sentence can only come from and fall out of a mother's or a father's mouths. As long as my breath is sufficient enough, I will take a stand against this discrimination, this speciesism, this cruelty that ignores and destroys those who are not like them; I'll take the side of those whose right to live was blocked. With all my heart and hope..."

— Sezen Aksu official website

28-year-old transvestite İrem Okan, who had sex with people she met on the internet in Bursa, became a victim of hate crime by the person she met on 22 September 2010. The mother of İrem Okan, as she was known in the public, was later found in front of her murdered child's house. While crying for her child, she stated: "My son had always been pushed from society because of his sexual preference. He wanted to study. They did not let him. They couldn't find a place for my son in the whole world. My son was guilty, but aren't those who slept with him guilty as well?" Artist Sezen Aksu later issued a letter dedicated to "İrem" on the anniversary of the founding of SPoD, which was opened to commemorate LGBT individuals who were killed.

Following the incident on 22 September 2010, the suspect was arrested later that day, and on 7 April 2011 he was sentenced to 28 years and 4 months in prison.

=== Roşin Çiçek ===
In July 2012, 17-year-old Kurdish Roşin Çiçek from Kayapınar, who had tried to run away from home as he was subject to domestic violence due to his homosexuality, was later killed by his father and uncles and his body was thrown on the roadside. The father and uncles who committed the murder confessed to their crimes. During the hearing of the case, Republican People's Party MP Mahmut Tanal, Ceren Women's Association and many LGBT associations demanded to intervene in the case. The court sentenced Çiçek's father to aggravated life imprisonment and his uncles to life imprisonment.

=== Ferhat İlken ===
On November 20, 2013 in İskenderun, Hatay, 27-year-old Ferhat İlken was handcuffed, his feet were tied, his head was sacked and smashed and he was eventually strangled. 3 Syrian suspects were arrested and released after investigations by the police. Zechariah Ghirep, one of the three Syrian citizens, confessed to the murder and was arrested again a month after the murder.

=== Çağla Joker ===
25-year-old trans women Çağla Joker and Nalan were attacked by two people in their house in Beyoğlu on 21 April 2014. Çağla Joker was killed at the scene. Life imprisonment for the defendant, who was tried for the deliberate murder of Çağla Joker, was reduced to 10 years due to "unjust provocation" and his "good conduct" as the defendant was under the age of 18. The defendant, in his testimony in court, stated: "We met two people who we thought were women. We bargained. He said he was a man. I wanted the money back. He said he would not give the money back and rained heavy curses on us".
