= Işık Doğudan Yükselir =

Studio album by Sezen Aksu
- Released: June 28 1995
- Studio: Stüdyo Atilla Özdemiroğlu, Marşa diz
- Genre: Pop, Traditional Pop, Folk Pop, Art Pop
- Label: Foneks

Sezen Aksu chronology
Deli Kızın Türküsü (1993)	Işık Doğudan Yükselir (1995)	Düş Bahçeleri (1996)

Işık Doğudan Yükselir (1995) is Sezen Aksu's twelfth Turkish release and one of her most commercially successful albums in Turkey. The album marked a change, explicitly engaging a variety of Turkish folk music styles. The CD was extremely popular, making something of public figure of Aksu, who was emerging as a public voice on a variety of matters.

== Track listing ==
1. Işık Doğudan Yükselir (Music: Sezen Aksu and Onno Tunç) Soprano Sertab Erener (Yüksel) Tenor Süha Yıldız
2. Davet (Lyrics: Sezen Aksu and Yelda Karataş / Music: Attila Özdemiroğlu)
3. Son Sardunyalar (Lyrics: Sezen Aksu and Yelda Karataş / Music: Ara Dinkjiyan)
4. Alâturka (Lyrics: Sezen Aksu / Music: Fahir Atakoğlu)
5. Yaktılar Halim'imi (Lyrics: Sezen Aksu and Meral Okay / Music: Fahir Atakoğlu)
6. Rakkas (Lyrics: Sezen Aksu and Yelda Karataş / Music: Attila Özdemiroğlu) "Lyrics Rewritten for "Salla Salla" from the soundtrack of the film Arabesk"
7. Onu Alma Beni Al (Lyrics: Sezen Aksu / Music: Arto Tunçboyacıyan)
8. Yeniliğe Doğru (Lyrics: Mevlânâ / Music: Arto Tunçboyacıyan)
9. Ne Ağlarsın (Lyrics-Music: Âşık Dâimî)
10. Ben Annemi İsterim (Lyrics-Music: Sezen Aksu)
11. Var Git Turnam (Yar ko parag boyin mernem - Bingöl) (Lyrics: Sezen Aksu and Meral Okay / Armenian lyrics for the song "Bingöl" : A.İsahakian)
12. La İlahe İllallah (Lyrics: Yunus Emre / Music: Sezen Aksu)
