= Armen Donelian =

American jazz musician

Armen Hrant Donelian (born December 1, 1950) is a jazz pianist, composer, educator and author.

Donelian was classically trained at the Westchester Conservatory of Music in White Plains, New York. He has appeared since 1975 as a featured soloist and bandleader, and with an array of jazz musicians, including Sonny Rollins, in international venues. A composer of over 100 works reflecting Classical, Middle Eastern and jazz influences, Donelian has produced 13 albums. He has received multiple awards as a Fulbright Senior Scholar and Specialist and an NEA Jazz Fellow. An educator at several New York institutions for 30 years, including The New School and William Paterson University, Donelian is also the author of Training The Ear Vol. 1 & 2 and offers master classes at leading throughout the world. A graduate of Columbia University and private student of Michael Pollon, Carl Bamberger, Ludmila Ulehla, Harold Seletsky and Richie Beirach, Donelian is the co-founder with Marc Mommaas of the Hudson Jazz Workshop.

== Discography ==
=== As leader/co-leader ===
Recording date	Title	Label	Year released	Personnel / Notes
1980–04	Stargazer	Atlas	1981	With Eddie Gomez & Billy Hart. Japan only. Reissued (Sunnyside, 2025)[CD].
1984–10, 1984–11	A Reverie: Solo Piano	Sunnyside	1986	Solo piano
1987–07	Trio '87	Odin	1988	With Carl Morten Iversen & Audun Kleive
1988–02	Secrets	Sunnyside	1988	Sextet, with Dick Oatts (tenor sax, soprano sax), Barry Danielian (trumpet, flugelhorn), Anthony Cox (bass), Bill Stewart (drums), Arto Tunçboyacıyan (percussion)
1990–01	The Wayfarer	Sunnyside	1990	Sextet, with Dick Oatts (tenor sax, soprano sax), Barry Danielian (trumpet, flugelhorn), Anthony Cox (bass), Bill Stewart (drums), Arto Tunçboyacıyan (percussion, vocals)
1992–05	Quartet Language	Playscape	2003	With Thomas Chapin, Calvin Hill & Jeff Williams
1998 – 1999	Grand Ideas, Vol. 1: Wave	Sunnyside	2000	Solo piano
1998 – 1999	Grand Ideas, Vol. 2: Mystic Heights	Sunnyside	2002	Solo piano
1998 – 1999	Grand Ideas, Vol. 3: Full Moon Music	Sunnyside	2005	Solo piano
2003–04	All or Nothing at All	Sunnyside	2006	Duo, with Marc Mommaas (sax); in concert
2007–03	Oasis	Sunnyside	2008	Trio, with David Clark (bass), Georges Schuller (drums)
2010–07 – 2011–01	Leapfrog	Sunnyside	2011	Quintet, with Marc Mommaas (tenor sax), Mike Moreno (guitar), Dean Johnson (bass), Tyshawn Sorey (drums)
2013–01, 2013–05	Sayat-Nova: Songs of My Ancestors	Sunnyside	2014	One disc solo piano; one disc trio, with David Clark (bass), George Schuller (drums)
2020–10, 2021–06	Fresh Start	Sunnyside	2022	Trio with Jay Anderson (bass), Dennis Mackrel (drums)
2020 – 2024	Inquiry	Sunnyside	2026	Quintet, with Dominique Eade (voice), Ed Neumeister (trombone), Jay Anderson (bass), Dennis Mackrel (drums)

=== As a member ===
Night Ark

- Moments (RCA/Novus, 1987)
- In Wonderland (PolyGram/EmArcy, 1996)
- Petals on Your Path (PolyGram/EmArcy, 1999)

=== As sideman ===
With Billy Harper

- Trying to Make Heaven My Home (MPS, 1979)
- The Believer (Baystate, 1980)
- The Billy Harper Quintet (Poljazz, 1981)
- V.A., Jazz Jamboree '80 (Polskie Nagrania Muza, 1980) – in omnibus live album

With Bobby Vince Paunetto

- Commit to Memory (Pathfinder, 1976; Bomba, 1998)
- Composer in Public (RSVP, 1996)
- Reconstituted (RSVP, 1999)

With Mongo Santamaria

- Afro-Indio (Vaya/Fania, 1975)
- Sofrito (Vaya/Fania, 1976)
- Mongo and Justo (Vaya/Fania, 1976)
- A La Carte (Vaya/Fania, 1976)

With Rory Stuart

- Nightwork (Cadence, 1984)
- Hurricane (Sunnyside, 1987)

With others

- Roy Ayers, Step into Our Life (Polydor, 1978)
- Cosmology, Cosmology (Vanguard, 1978)
- Datevik Hovanesian, Listen to My Heart (Sony, 1998)
- Julie Lyonn Lieberman, Mixing America (Huiksi, 1996)
