= Arto Tunçboyacıyan =

American folk and jazz multi-instrumentalist (born 1957)

Arto Tunçboyacıyan Արտո Թունջբոյաջյան
- Born: Arto Tunçboyacıyan; 4 August 1957 (age 69)
- Origin: Istanbul, Turkey
- Genres: Avant-garde; jazz; folk; Armenian folk; rock
- Occupations: Singer; musician; songwriter
- Instruments: Vocals; percussion; duduk; sazabo; bular
- Years active: 1968–present
- Labels: Columbia; Serjical Strike
- Member of: Armenian Navy Band; Night Ark; Serart
- Website: naregatsi.org/Artoistan (archived)

Arto Sedraki Tunçboyacıyan (Armenian: Արտո Սեդրակի Թունջբոյաջյան; Western Armenian: Արթօ Սէտրակի Թունճպոյաճեան, romanized: Art'ō T'unjpoyajean; born August 4, 1957) is an American avant-garde folk and jazz multi-instrumentalist and singer of Armenian descent. He fronts his Armenian Navy Band group and is also a member of the instrumental quartet Night Ark.

Tunçboyacıyan had appeared on more than 200 records in Europe before arriving in the United States, where he went on to work with numerous jazz musicians, including Chet Baker, Marc Johnson, Al Di Meola, and Joe Zawinul, as well as performing semi-regularly with Paul Winter and the Earth Band. He has worked with Turkish singer Sezen Aksu, the Greek singer Eleftheria Arvanitaki and the guitarist Adonis Mitzelos. Tunçboyacıyan's elder brother, Onno Tunçboyacıyan, was also a musician, and they have collaborated on several occasions.

== Early life ==
Arto Tunçboyacıyan was born in Istanbul, Turkey. His father was a shoemaker of Armenian descent.

At 11, he began his career playing and recording traditional Anatolian music with various musicians, including his brother Onno Tunç, thus establishing himself as a professional musician throughout Turkey and Europe.

In 1981, Tunçboyacıyan moved to the United States and settled in New York.

== Career ==
Arto started an association with Armenian-American oud player Ara Dinkjian. In 1985, Ara Dinkjian founded and led the quartet Night Ark. Arto recorded the duo project with Ara Dinkjian, "Tears of Dignity" (1994) and "Onno" (1996), a homage to his brother Onno, who died in a plane crash in 1996.

In 1988, his solo albums Virginland and Main Root were released. In 1997, Aile Muhabbeti was released in Turkey and used as a movie soundtrack. He composed the songs with Armenian and Turkish musicians. In 2000, he released Every Day is a New Life.

In 1998, Tunçboyacıyan returned to Yerevan, the capital of Armenia, and met pianist and keyboardist Vahagn Hayrapetyan. They soon organised a rehearsal to recruit musicians to start a band. Ten local musicians were enlisted, thus becoming the Armenian Navy Band.

Some months later, in 1999, the band recorded their first album, called Bzdik Zinvor, in Yerevan. The recording was followed by their first European tour in 2000, in Italy, Germany, Austria and Spain. The band then performed concerts in France, Belgium and the Netherlands. During a 2001 stop in Istanbul, the Armenian Navy Band recorded their second album, New Apricot, in 2001.

Armenian Navy Band's next album was Türkçe Sözlü Hafif Anadolu Müziği (English: Light Anatolian Music With Turkish Words), recorded in the winter of 2001.

Tunçboyacıyan's 2001 album Aile Muhabbeti was used as soundtrack in two films: Hemşo (2001) and Mon père est ingénieur (2004).

The 2003 album Serart is a collaboration with Serj Tankian of System of a Down. They found common ground in shared Armenian backgrounds and a passion for sonic explorations in creating music that claimed to be "completely new."

In the fall of 2003, a new project was born in a Yerevan studio. It was the beginning of a large sound project called "Sound of Our Life – Part One: Natural Seeds." The project was put together by Arto and the Armenian Navy Band, who joined their talents one more time in the fall of 2006 for Part Two. They are hourlong compositions for the ANB and choir and string orchestras.

In 2004, Tunçboyacıyan opened the ANB Avant-garde Folk Music Club in Yerevan. That year, he recorded the album Artostan, which was released in 2006. In 2006, the Armenian Navy Band was nominated for Best Band of Europe and the Audience Award at the 2006 BBC World Music Awards.

There is a hidden track on the album Toxicity by System of a Down where Arto contributed with the band to a traditional Armenian Church hymn, "Der Voghormya (Lord Have Mercy)". He played the instrumental part of "Science" on the same album, and his voice can be heard in the interlude of "Bubbles" from Steal This Album!

In 2007, he formed Yash-Ar with fellow Turkish-Armenian rock artist Yaşar Kurt. Yash-Ar comprises the first part of his and Yaşar Kurt's first names.

In February 2011, Arto Tunçboyacıyan, as a band member of The Paul Winter Consort, won the Grammy for Best New Age Album for Miho: Journey to the Mountain.

=== Armenian Navy Band ===
The Armenian Navy Band lineup varies from traditional (duduk, zurna, kemanche, kanun) to contemporary (trombone, alto sax, tenor, soprano sax, trumpet, bass, drums, keyboard and piano) instrumentation. The band plays a mixture of adapted and modern Armenian folk music. (Note that, being landlocked, the country of Armenia has no navy.)

- Arto Tunçboyacıyan (percussion, vocals, bular)
- Anahit Artushyan (kanun)
- Armen Ayvazyan (kemanche)
- Armen Hyusnunts (tenor and soprano saxophone)
- Ashot Harutiunyan (trombone)
- David Nalchajyan (alto saxophone)
- Tigran Suchyan (trumpet)
- Norayr Kartashyan (blul, duduk, zurna)
- Vardan Grigoryan (duduk, zurna)
- Arman Jalalyan (drums)
- Vahagn Hayrapetyan (piano, keyboards)
- Artyom Manukyan (bass, cello)
- Vardan Arakelyan (bass)
- Gagik Khodavirdi (guitar)
- Vahram Davtyan (trombone)

== Discography ==
=== Solo ===
Year	Album	With other artist(s)	Label
1989	Virgin Land		Keytone/Svota Music
1994	Main Roots		Keytone/Svota Music
1996	Tears of Dignity	Ara Dinkjian	Svota Music
1998	Onno		Svota Music
1998	Triboh	M. P. de Vito and R. Marcotulli	PoloSud
1998	Avci		Svota Music/Imaj Müzik
2000	Every Day Is a New Life		Living Music/Earth Music Production
2001	Aile Muhabbeti		Svota Music
2003	Serart	Serj Tankian	Serjical Strike/Columbia
2003	Türkçe Sözlü Hafif Anadolu Müziği		Imaj Müzik/Svota Music/Heaven and Earth
2005	Artostan		Svota Music/Heaven and Earth
2005	Love Is Not in Your Mind		Svota Music/Heaven and Earth
2006	Le Voyage en Arménie		

=== Armenian Navy Band ===
Year	Album	Label
1999	Bzdik Zinvor	Svota Music
2001	New Apricot	Svota Music
2004	Sound of Your Life Part I - "Natural Seeds"	Svota Music/Heaven and Earth
2006	How Much Is Yours?	Svota Music
2009	Under Your Thoughts	Svota Music
2013	Sound of Our Life — Part 2: "Ethno Dispensary"	D. SVOTA MUSIC/llc Avant-Garde Folk Music Production
2013	Simple Like Water, Deep Like Water	D. SVOTA MUSIC/llc Avant-Garde Folk Music Production

=== Night Ark ===
Year	Album	Label
1986	Picture	RCA/Novus
1988	Moments	RCA/Novus
1998	In Wonderland	PolyGram
2000	Petals on Your Path	EmArcy
2000	Treasures	Traditional Crossroads

=== Yash-Ar ===
- Nefrete Kine Karşı (Arma Music, 2009)

=== As sideman ===
With Ron Getz

- Ego State (Alithea Records, 1988)

With Arthur Blythe

- Night Song (Clarity, 1997)

With Al Di Meola

- Kiss My Axe (Tomato, 1991)
- World Sinfonia (Tomato, 1991)
- World Sinfonia II – Heart of the Immigrants (Tomato, 1993)
- World Sinfonía III – The Grande Passion (Telarc, 2000)

With Ellery Eskelin

- Figure of Speech (Soul Note, 1991)

With Human Element

- Human Element (Abstract Logix, 2011)
- You Are In You (Human Element Music, 2018)

With Marc Johnson & Right Brain Patrol

- Right Brain Patrol (JMT, 1991)
- Magic Labyrinth (JMT, 1995)

With Paul Motian & Simon Nabatov

- Circle the Line (GM, 1986)

With Hank Roberts

- Little Motor People (JMT, 1993)

With Paul Winter & The Earth Band

- Journey With The Sun (Living Music, 2000)

== Other appearances ==
Year	Artist	Song	Album
2001	System of a Down feat. Arto Tunçboyacıyan	"Science"	Toxicity
2001	System of a Down feat. Arto Tunçboyacıyan	"Der Voghormia”	Toxicity
2002	System of a Down feat. Arto Tunçboyacıyan	"Bubbles"	Steal This Album!
2003	Wax Poetic feat. Norah Jones and Arto Tunçboyacıyan	"Angels"	Nublu Sessions
2011	Kargin Studio	«Alabalanitsa»	«Alabalanitsa Soundtrack»
2012	maNga	"Hoş Geldin"	e-akustik

== Filmography ==
- 2017: Nice Evening (Լավ Երեկո), special guest, as himself

== Awards ==
- Armenian Music Award (2002)
- Armenian Music Award - Best World Fusion Album with the Armenian Navy Band (2006)
- Armenian Music Award - Best Original Song with the Armenian Navy Band (2006)
- World Music Award (2006)
- Armenian Music Award (2007)
- Grammy (2011)
