= Jerusalem International Oud Festival =

The Israel Oud Festival was founded in 2000 in Jerusalem, by producer and musical director Eli Grunfeld.

In 2003 Grunfeld initiated an extension of the festival in Tel Aviv, at the 'Tzavta' theatre. The Tel Aviv Oud Festival takes place every year in August.

The Oud festival of Tel Aviv have acquired great acclaim in local culture and every year, have the top musicians in the country and the genre performing. Tel Aviv's Oud Festivals, each year, have the best Oud players playing original music, along with Mediterranean classics, debut performances and the festival gives a stage to many special projects revolving around the instrument.

Among the prominent Oud soloists that took place in the oud festival of Tel Aviv: Ara Dinkjian, considered one of the premier Oud players in the world, Yair Dalal, Nizar Rduan, Darvish Darvish (who won first place the Cairo Oud competition), Wasim Ouda (Second place at the competition), Amir Shahassar, Yoel Ben-Simchon, Ziad Habib, Yaniv Taichman, Alon Ammano Campino, Said Ajami and many more. Among the leading singers and performing artists who have taken part in the Tel Aviv festival special productions are: Zehava Ben, Lubna Salame, Galit Giat, Shlomo Bar, Sahara City, Lea Shabat, Haim Ankri, Gil Ron Shema, Kobi Oz and more.
