= Sezen Aksu =

Turkish singer, songwriter and producer (born 1954)

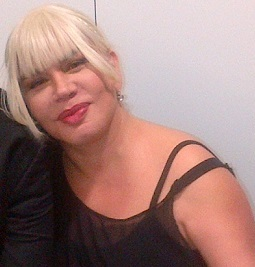
- Aksu in 2016
- Born: Fatma Sezen Yıldırım; 13 July 1954 (age 72); Sarayköy, Denizli, Turkey
- Other name: Sezen Seley
- Education: Ege University (no degree)
- Occupations: Singer; songwriter; poet; composer; producer; actress
- Spouses: Hasan Yüksektepe (m. 1972; div. 1972) Ali Engin Aksu (m. 1974; div. 1978) Sinan Özer (m. 1981; div. 1983) Ahmet Utlu (m. 1993; div. 1997)
- Children: 1 (with Sinan Özer)
- Musical career
- Genre: Pop
- Years active: 1975–present
- Labels: Hop; Kent; Kervan; Sembol; Fono; Coşkun; Foneks; Karma; Raks; PolyGram; Post; DMC; Seyhan
- Website: www.sezenaksu.com.tr

Fatma Sezen Yıldırım (born 13 July 1954), known professionally as Sezen Aksu (Turkish pronunciation: [seˈzen ˈaksu]), is a Turkish singer, songwriter and producer. She is one of the most successful singers in Turkey, having sold over 40 million albums worldwide. Her nicknames include the "Queen of Turkish Pop" and "Minik Serçe" ("Little Sparrow").

Aksu's influence on Turkish pop and world music has continued since her debut in 1975, and has been reinforced by her patronage of and collaboration with many other musicians, including Yonca Evcimik, Sertab Erener, Şebnem Ferah, Aşkın Nur Yengi, Hande Yener, Yıldız Tilbe, Işın Karaca, Seden Gürel, Harun Kolçak and Levent Yüksel. Sezen Aksu is widely known as a successful songwriter. Her work with Tarkan resulted in continental hits like "Şımarık" and "Şıkıdım" and her collaboration with Goran Bregović widened her international audience. In 2010, NPR named her as one of the "50 Great Voices" of the world.

== Biography ==
Sezen Aksu was born in Sarayköy, Denizli, Turkey. Her mother, Şehriban Hanım was a science teacher and the daughter of a family who originally came from Thessaloniki. Her father, Sami Yıldırım, was of Laz origin from Rize and a mathematics teacher. Her family moved to Bergama when she was three years old and she spent her childhood and early youth there. Aksu's parents discouraged her singing because they wanted her to have a steady profession as a doctor or engineer. She used to wait until they left the house and sing on the family's balcony. After finishing high school, she began studying at the local agricultural institute, but dropped college to concentrate on music.

Along with her close friend Ajda Pekkan, Aksu is credited with laying the foundations of Turkish pop music in the 1970s. Her sound has also spread across the Balkans and Greece. Aksu has also toured in Europe and the U.S to critical appraise.

She has championed a variety of causes, including support for constitutional reform, minority rights, women's rights, the environment, and educational reform in Turkey. Aksu has been married and divorced four times, but kept the name from her second marriage to Ali Engin Aksu, a doctor of geology who currently resides in Canada. She has a son with Sinan Özer, named Mithat Can, who is also a lead vocalist of Pist'on band.

== Career ==
=== 1975–1983: Early life and career beginnings ===
Sezen Aksu released her first single, Haydi Şansım/Gel Bana in 1975 under the name of "Sezen Seley". However, she remained undiscovered until her 1976 single Olmaz Olsun/Vurdumduymaz reached number one in the Turkish charts. In 1976, Sezen Aksu won the "Promising Female Artist of the Year" award. Her first album was 1977's Allahaısmarladık, released as a 33's and named after her previous single Allahaısmarladık/Kaç Yıl Geçti Aradan, contains her previous singles as well as a few additional pieces like Uzun Lafın Kısası and Gözlerindeki Bulut.

Aksu finally decided to represent Turkey at the Eurovision Song Contest in the mid-70s. However, even though she competed in the national finals for the competition three times, with Küçük Bir Aşk Masalı (A Little Love Tale) as a duet with Özdemir Erdoğan, "Heyamola" which was performed as a trio with Coşkun Demir and Ali Kocatepe, and 1945 which was a solo performance, she did not get the chance to represent Turkey abroad. It was to be left to her pupil, Sertab Erener, to win the Eurovision and realise Aksu's dream to push her musical vision further into Europe.

=== 1980s ===
In the 80's, Aksu had a relationship with Turkish-Armenian producer Onno Tunç that was both romantic and professional. As a couple they put their signatures to works that broke new ground in Turkish pop music, such as Sen Ağlama, Git, Sezen Aksu'88 and Sezen Aksu Söylüyor. Her music matured in the 90's, when she co-produced her best selling album to-date Gülümse with Tunç. The A-1 track from the album called Hadi Bakalım was a hit in Turkey and Europe, and was published as a single in Germany. It was to be later rediscovered in Europop by singer Loona as Rhythm of the Night. She also began to produce albums for her vocalists, notably producing Aşkın Nur Yengi's debut album Sevgiliye (To a Lover) again with Tunç. She was to repeat her success as a teacher with artists Sertab Erener and Levent Yüksel.

=== 1990s–present ===
Parting ways with Tunç, in 1995, Aksu branched out with the experimental album Işık Doğudan Yükselir, drawing both on western classical and regional Turkish musical traditions. This album made her name known outside Turkey and gave her a worldwide audience, especially in Europe. In 1996, she released Düş Bahçeleri as a tribute to Tunç, who died that same year tragically when his private plane crashed. In 1997, she released Düğün ve Cenaze, this time collaborating with Goran Bregović.

She returned to her roots with Adı Bende Saklı, which was released in 1998. She began to use experimental sounds and was once again pushing Turkish pop into the future. Aksu continued with this trend with her subsequent albums Deliveren, Şarkı Söylemek Lazım (which also featured former Sparks bassist Martin Gordon as engineer/mixer, who also was bass player on her subsequent European tour), and Yaz Bitmeden between the years 2000–2003. After a two-year hiatus, she returned with Bahane in 2005. That same year she released Kardelen, where all proceeds went to charity, and before the end of 2005 released a Bahane/Remixes double-CD album, which contained the original Bahane album in disc one and the remixes of songs in disc two.

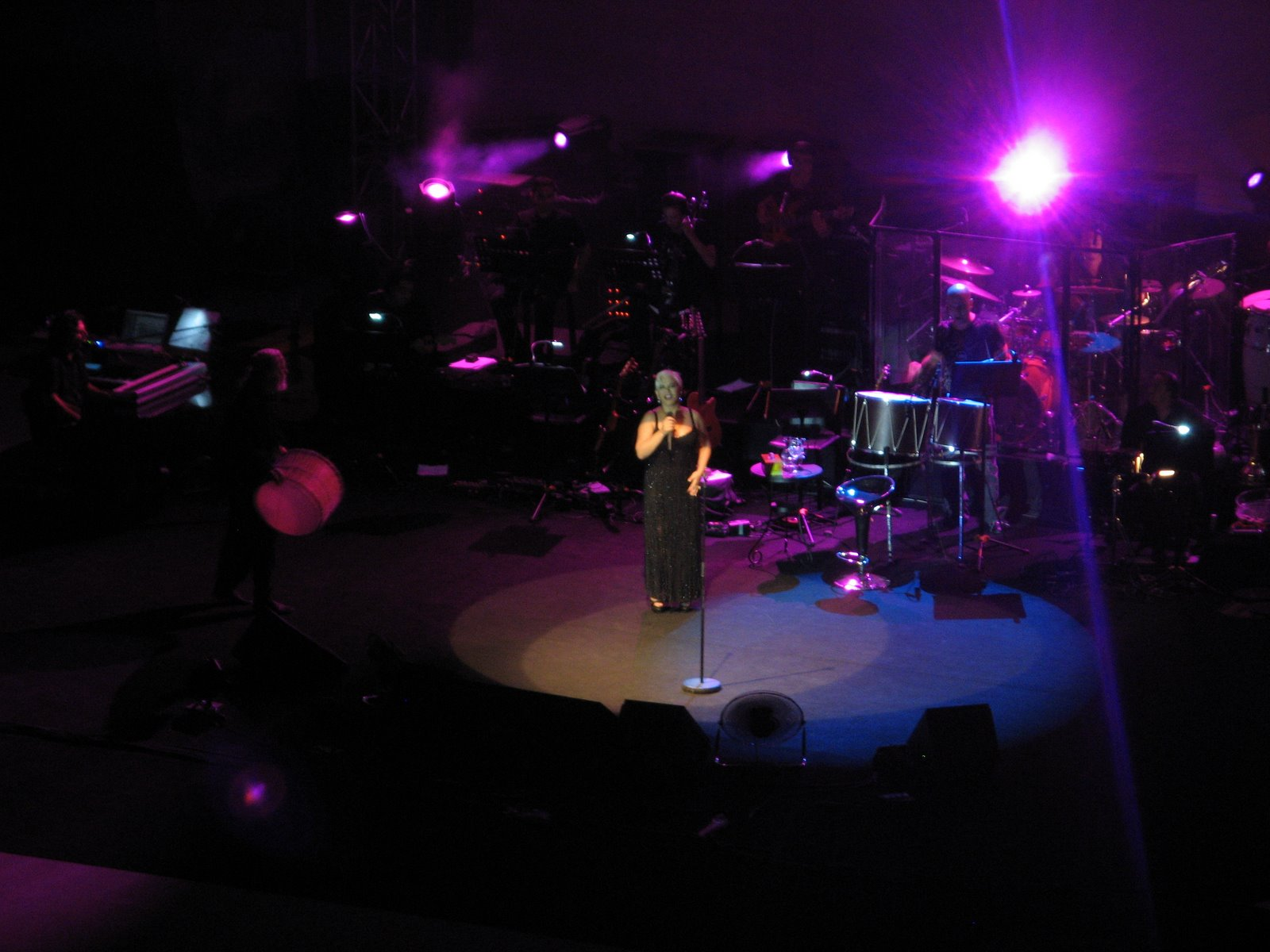
Sezen Aksu's concert at Maltepe University, 2009

In 2005, she was featured in Fatih Akın's documentary film Crossing the Bridge: The Sound of Istanbul with a performance of the song "İstanbul Hatırası". In 2006, Aksu published a book called Eksik Şiir, a collection of 197 songs written by her between 1975-2006. The book was well-received and sold 17,000 copies in the first 4 days after its release. It was followed by Eksik Şiir İkinci Kitap in 2016.

In 2008, Aksu released her album called Deniz Yıldızı through Starfish Records. In 2009 she released her album Yürüyorum Düş Bahçelerinde. The album contains new original songs as well as some older songs which were composed by Sezen Aksu for other singers, most notably "Çakkıdı", "Kibir", "Yok Ki".

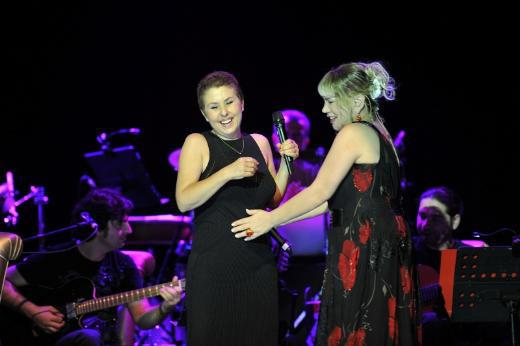
Nilüfer and Sezen Aksu at the Cemil Topuzlu Open-Air Theatre, 2012

In 2010, Aksu was on the "50 Great Sounds" list set by the American NPR radio. Sezen Aksu's concert with Fahir Atakoğlu in Stockholm, Sweden in April 2010 was attended by many Turkish and Swedish music lovers. After a 10-year break, "TurkofAmerica" and "GNL Entertainment" organized a series of concerts by Aksu in the USA, with the corporate sponsorship of the Washington-based Turkish Cultural Foundation. The three concerts were held between 4–7 April at three different venues: Strathmore in Maryland, Carnegie Hall in New York, and Prudential Hall in New Jersey. Atakoğlu also accompanied Aksu during her concerts in the USA. After performing well over the time allocated for her New Jersey concert, Aksu told the audience: "We have exceeded the [time] limits, the Americans have also set a record of patience, New Jersey will be like this tonight, I will not leave this scene until I make all of you happy".

In 2011, Aksu began producing music again and released the studio album Öptüm. The album consists of songs written and composed by Aksu, including "Unuttun mu Beni", "Vay", "Aşka Şükrederim", "Ah Felek Yordun Beni", and also features a song written by Nazan Öncel titled "Ballı". Cemal Süreya's poem "Sayım" was turned by Aksu into a song and included in the album as well.

At her concert in Volkswagen Arena Istanbul in January 2016, Aksu announced that she would retire from performing live on stage: "Each ending is a new beginning. I will continue to produce [music], but I'm going to say goodbye to the stage after doing a few concerts I promised before. This is my last concert in Istanbul. I'm grateful for having you here with me today in memory of 40 years of my career." In September, she stated again that she would continue making music.

In January 2022, Aksu was criticized by conservatives and religious figures for calling Adam and Eve ignorant in the song "Ne Şahane Bir Şey Yaşamak" (a cover of the 2012 song "C'est la vie"). The song was originally included in the 2017 tribute album Alakasız Şarkılar, Vol. 1 in memory of Yaşar Gaga, but resurfaced on the social media in early 2022 after its lyric video was published on Aksu's official YouTube channel on 30 December 2021. President Recep Tayyip Erdoğan, leader of the Nationalist Movement Party Devlet Bahçeli, and the Directorate of Religious Affairs, were among the political figures and government agencies that criticized Aksu and the song. After remaining silent for a month, Aksu eventually released a statement on her Facebook account on January 22. "As you know, the matter is not me; the matter is the country," she remarked, thanking everyone who have shown their support for her. Aksu also revealed the lyrics to a new song she wrote the previous day: "You won't be able to crush my tongue."

== Activism ==
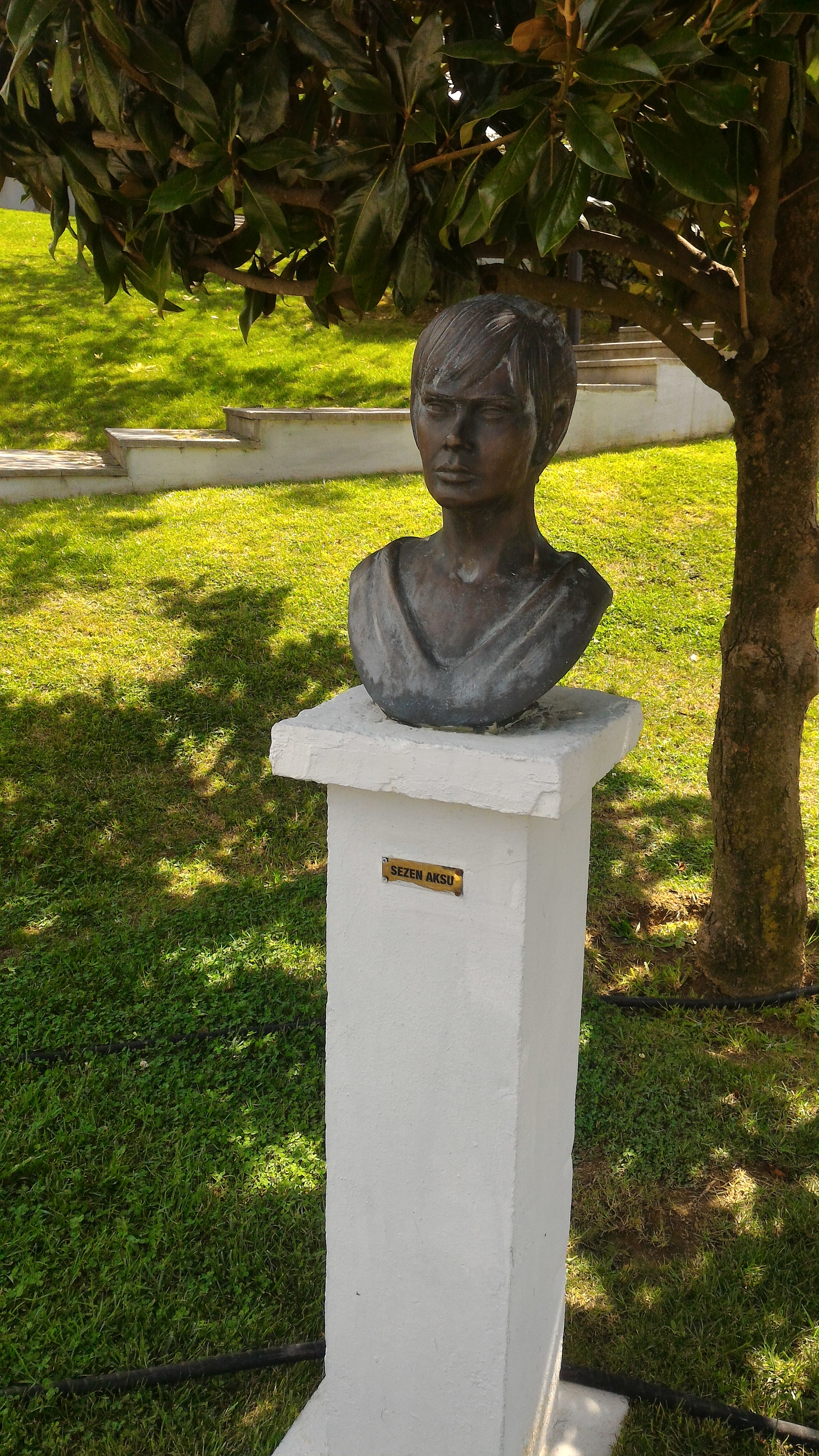
Bust of Sezen Aksu in the Akat Artists' Park

Aksu is known for her sensitivity to social problems and events. In 2009 she supported Recep Tayyip Erdoğan's democratic initiative and the settlement process in Turkey. As a result journalist Hikmet Çetinkaya claimed that Aksu's father was a supporter of the Nur movement. While some artists stood behind Aksu, some expressed that Aksu's behavior was unreasonable. In 2012, Aksu wrote the song "Tanrının Gözyaşları" (Tears of God) in memory of soldiers who had died during the Kurdish–Turkish conflict.

About the young people who participated in the first days of the Gezi Park protests in 2013 she said: "This is the first youth revolution in the world. They have sent an extraordinary message and the people there and those who are coming to the streets are speaking their words with an extraordinary language." In 2014, she again paid tribute to the young people who took part in the protests with her new single "Yeni ve Yeni Kalanlar".

Aksu is keen to fight against issues such as misogyny, illiteracy, discrimination, bullying and homophobia. According to the LGBT magazine, KAOS GL, she is a major gay icon, with the Turkish LGBT community embracing her as a pop culture representative. In 2002, alongside Ajda Pekkan and Seyyal Taner, Aksu was named as one of the gay icons admired by the Turkish LGBT people in the book Eşcinsel Erkekler by Murat Hocaoğlu. In a survey conducted by KAOS GL, she was chosen as one of the favorite gay icons by the participants. Aksu is praised by the LGBT community in Turkey and publicly assists and supports LGBT people through charity work. In 2008, she supported LGBT association Lambdaistanbul, which was closed by a court decision based on "the fact that it is contrary to general morality". In 2013, Aksu performed with transsexual actress Ayta Sözeri on stage, and later a huge rainbow flag symbolizing the LGBT movement was waved in the air, the first time that a Turkish artist had publicly shown support for LGBT on stage. Later in 2013, she published a statement on her official website in support of the SPOD (Social Policy Gender Identity and Sexual Orientation Studies Association) on its first anniversary. In her statement, she mentioned Mesut Şaban Okan, nicknamed "İrem", who was a victim of hate crime in Bursa in 2010. Referencing Melek Okan's words about her child's death, who had said "They could not find a place for my child anywhere in the whole world!", Aksu talked about violence against LGBT people and added that she would fight against violence and discrimination.

"'They could not find a place for my child anywhere in the whole world...'

Can any sentence be so concise, deep and painful? This sentence can only come from and fall out of a mother's or a father's mouth.

As long as my breath is sufficient enough, I will take a stand against this discrimination, this speciesism, this cruelty that ignores and destroys those who are not like them; I'll take the side of those whose right to live was blocked. With all my heart and hope..."

— Sezen Aksu (SPoD internet website, 11 October 2012)

266854 Sezenaksu, an asteroid discovered in 2009, is named after the artist.

== Personal life ==
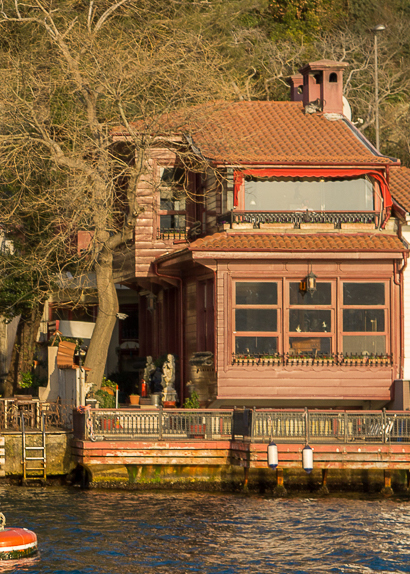
Aksu's mansion (yalı) in Kanlıca, Beykoz

Sezen Aksu married Hasan Yüksektepe at a young age, and the two got divorced shortly afterwards. At the beginning of her professional life, she married Ali Engin Aksu, whose surname she adopted and later used. On 10 July 1981, Sezen Aksu married Sinan Özer while being pregnant with their child. The couple divorced in 1983. Her marriage to journalist Ahmet Utlu in 1993 was also short-lived and ended in divorce.

At the start of 1992, Aksu started her professional relationship with Uzay Heparı which he only produced and arranged her 1993 album Deli Kızın Türküsü until his accident in 1994, however Aksu's friendship with Hepari got constrained due to production and schedule issues also her rival Yıldız Tilbe who got reportedly been in a feud towards Aksu resulting to production sessions with Hepari had been seized as he also faced schedule issues during his work as a producer, most of the news outlets had been rumored that Aksu had been felt baffled with those comparisons, as later in 1995 and 2005, Aksu and Tilbe were responding by diss tracks that referred with their relationship issues with Hepari. "Onu Alma Beni Al" ("Take me, not her") by Aksu was released in 1995 from her album Işık Doğudan Yükselir(Light Rises from the East). Ey was released by Tilbe from her 2005 album Papatya Baharı. which the comparisons grew larger and journalists seen this as a infamous debate topic in Turkish pop history.

In 2019, Aksu and Tilbe reconciled and reunited as friends, bringing an end to their rivalry.

== Discography ==
=== Studio albums ===
- 1977: Allahaısmarladık
- 1978: Serçe
- 1980: Sevgilerimle
- 1981: Ağlamak Güzeldir
- 1982: Firuze
- 1984: Sen Ağlama
- 1986: Git...
- 1988: Sezen Aksu'88
- 1989: Sezen Aksu Söylüyor
- 1991: Gülümse
- 1993: Deli Kızın Türküsü
- 1995: Işık Doğudan Yükselir (Ex Oriente Lux - Light Rises From the East)
- 1996: Düş Bahçeleri
- 1997: Düğün ve Cenaze
- 1998: Adı Bende Saklı
- 2000: Deliveren
- 2002: Şarkı Söylemek Lazım
- 2003: Yaz Bitmeden
- 2005: Bahane
- 2005: Kardelen
- 2008: Deniz Yıldızı
- 2009: Yürüyorum Düş Bahçeleri'nde...
- 2011: Öptüm
- 2017: Biraz Pop Biraz Sezen
- 2018: Demo
- 2022: Demo 2
- 2025: Paşa Gönül Şarkıları
- 2026: Biz de Yeniden Başlarız

== Filmography ==
- Minik Serçe (The Little Sparrow) (1979)
- Büyük Yalnızlık (Great Solitude) (1990)
- Crossing The Bridge: The Sound of Istanbul (2005)
- The Ottoman Republic (2008)

== Musicals ==
- Sezen Aksu Aile Gazinosu (Sezen Aksu Family Music Hall) (1982)
- Bin Yıl Önce Bin Yıl Sonra (1000 Years Before, 1000 Years Later) (1986)

== Books ==
- Eksik Şiir (The Missing Poem) (First issue: 9 September 2006 - Second issue: 11 May 2007)
- Eksik Şiir İkinci Kitap (The Missing Poem, Book Two) (November 2016)

== See also ==
- List of Turkish musicians
