= Adı Bende Saklı =

Studio album by Sezen Aksu
- Released: December 20, 1998
- Genre: Pop
- Label: Universal
- Producer: Levent Semerci

Sezen Aksu chronology
| Düğün ve Cenaze (1997) | Adı Bende Saklı (1998) | Deliveren (2000) |

Adı Bende Saklı is the 15th studio album recorded by Turkish singer, songwriter and producer Sezen Aksu. It was released on December 20, 1998, through Universal Music. The album was produced by Levent Semerci.

== Background ==
The title track of the album is the eighth song, "Adı Bende Saklı".The Turkish lyrics were written by Sezen Aksu and late Meral Okay, one of her best and longest lasting friends.

Three songs from the album had videos: "Tutuklu", "Adı Bende Saklı" and "Ruhuma Asla". The album received critical acclaim by many and is also seen as a benchmark 1990s Turkish pop music album.

== Track listing ==
1. "Ud Taksimi" (0:57)
2. "Tutuklu" (4:25) (lyrics – music: Sezen Aksu, arrangement: Kıvanç K.)
3. "Kaderim" (4:06)(lyrics – music: Sezen Aksu, arrangement: Kıvanç K.)
4. "Hazan" (5:41) (lyrics – music: Sezen Aksu, arrangement: Aykut Gürel)
5. "Erkek Güzeli" (4:06) (lyrics – music: Sezen Aksu, arrangement: Murat Yeter)
6. "Kusura Bakma" (1976) (4:16) (lyrics – music: Sezen Aksu, arrangement: Murat Yeter)
7. "Ruhuma Asla" (4:58) (lyrics – music: Sezen Aksu)
8. "Adı Bende Saklı" (3:46) (lyrics: Meral Okay, Sezen Aksu, music: Yannis Karalis)
9. "Ben Sevdalı Sen Belalı" (5:26) (lyrics – music: Selami Şahin, arrangement: Garo Mafyan)
10. "Şimal Yıldızı" (5:12) (lyrics: Sezen Aksu, Meral Okay, music: Sezen Aksu, arrangement: Aşkın Arsunan)
11. "Yola Çıkmalı" (4:09) (lyrics – music: Sezen Aksu, arrangement: Aykut Gürel)
12. "İnce Mevzu" (4:17) (lyrics: Mustafa Sandal, Sezen Aksu, music – arrangement: Mustafa Sandal)
13. "Denge" (4:59) (lyrics: Turgut Uyar, music: Sezen Aksu, Aykut Gürel, arrangement: Aykut Gürel)
14. "Adı Menekşe" (4:53) (lyrics: Meral Okay, Sezen Aksu, music: Sezen Aksu, Aşkın Arsunan, arrangement: Kıvanç K.), CD Bonus
15. "Ruhuma Asla" (5:06) (lyrics – music: Sezen Aksu), CD Bonus
