= John Berberian =

American musician (born 1941)

John J. Berberian (born October 9, 1941) is an American musician known for his virtuosity on the oud, the Middle Eastern stringed instrument.

== Early life ==
Berberian was born in New York City as the son of Armenian immigrants. His father, Yervant Berberian, was an accomplished oud player and an instrument maker. Oud masters of Armenian, Turkish, and Greek heritage frequented his family's home. John Berberian started his musical education learning the violin, but by the age of 10 began imitating his father on the oud. At the age of 16, he had his first job as a musician, playing the oud in a band in Whitinsville, Massachusetts.

== Education ==
He graduated from Columbia University with a B.A. in economics, and received his MBA from Harvard Business School. While a student, he performed regularly in Manhattan nightclubs. From the early 1960s, he recorded for a variety of labels including Mainstream Records (his first label), MGM, RCA, Roulette, and Verve.

== Career ==
He expanded beyond the ethnic music market in the mid to late 1960s, decades before "world music" became fashionable, with a series of LPs which explored fusions between traditional Middle Eastern music, psychedelic rock and jazz. These included Expressions East (1964), Music of the Middle East (1966), and Middle Eastern Rock (1969) with guitarist Joe Beck. He also set up his own recording studio and record label, Olympia. Simultaneously with his career as a musician, he worked as a purchasing agent in New York.

He was awarded teaching grants as a musician by the Pennsylvania Council on the Arts in 1996 and by the Massachusetts Cultural Council in 2004. He has performed worldwide for over 40 years.

== Personal life ==
He is a trustee of the Armenian Apostolic Church in Whitinsville, Massachusetts, and lives with his family in Shrewsbury.

== Discography ==
- Expressions East (Mainstream, 1964)
- Oud Artistry (Mainstream, 1965)
- Music of the Middle East (Roulette, 1966)
- Middle Eastern Rock (Verve, 1969)
- A Mid Eastern Odyssey (Olympia, 1973)
- Echoes of Armenia (Olympia, 1976)
- The Dance Album (Olympia, 1978)

=== Accompaniment ===
- With Rosko, Music And Gibran (A Contemporary Interpretation) (Verve Forecast, 1968) (musical accompaniment)
