= Özdemir Erdoğan =

- Born: Mahmut Özdemir Erdoğan; 17 June 1940 (age 85); Istanbul, Turkey
- Genres: Jazz, Turkish folk, Turkish classical
- Occupation: Musician
- Instrument: Guitar
- Years active: 1968–present

Özdemir Erdoğan (born 17 June 1940) is a Turkish singer-songwriter and composer. He was elected as a Turkish state artist in 1998.

== Early life ==
Of Armenian descent on his maternal side and Circassian and Turkish descent on his paternal side, Özdemir Erdogan was born in Istanbul on 17 June 1940. His mother was a classical pianist, and his uncle was a piano and violin player as well. The first training was taken from these channels from a young age. The unique conditions between the years 1940 and 1950 are one of the important factors preventing Özdemir Erdogan from receiving formal arts education. Another issue was that his father prescribed an absolute basic education with the conditions of those dates. In this educational process, which lasted until the age of 15–16, Özdemir Erdoğan's artistic subjects were more likely to be found which were supported by his teachers at the schools.

Özdemir Erdoğan graduated from Kadikoy Commerce High School in 1960 and completed his military service as a reserve officer teacher in Adıyaman, Besni Araplar village as a teacher.
