= Aşkın Nur Yengi =

Turkish singer and actress (born 1970)

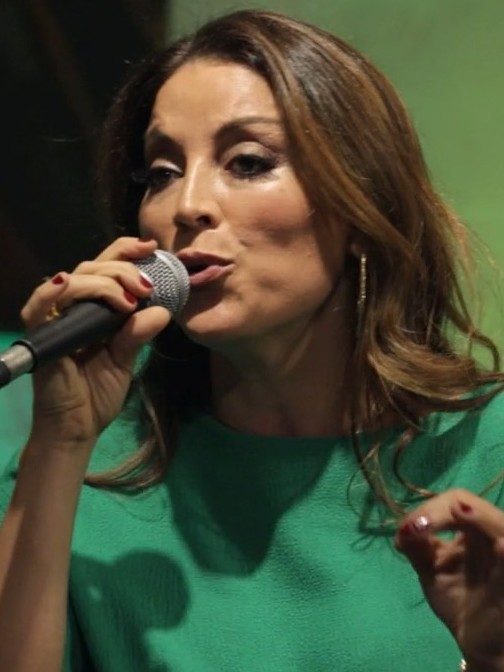
- Aşkın Nur Yengi on stage in 2014
- Born: Aşkın Nur Yengi; 3 July 1970 (age 56); Istanbul, Turkey
- Occupations: Singer, actress
- Years active: 1981–present
- Spouse: Haluk Bilginer (m. 2006; div. 2012)
- Children: 1
- Musical career
- Genres: Pop
- Instrument: Cello
- Labels: Fono; Emre Grafson; Marşandiz; Sony Music/Columbia Records

Aşkın Nur Yengi (born on 3 July 1970) is a Turkish singer, composer, and actress. She started working as a backing vocalist for Sezen Aksu and with Aksu's help, released her first studio album in 1990. With her debut album Sevgiliye in 1990, she became one of the most successful Turkish singers of the '90s.

== Personal life ==
Yengi was married to Haluk Bilginer in 2006 and they have a daughter. The couple divorced in 2012 after six years.

== Discography ==
=== Albums ===
Release date	Album	Producer	Notes
30 January 1990	Sevgiliye	Fono	
2 September 1991	Hesap Ver	Emre Grafson	
15 July 1993	Sıramı Bekliyorum	Emre Grafson	
12 December 1994	Karaçiçeğim	Emre Grafson	
6 June 1997	Haberci	Emre Grafson	
17 June 1999	Aşk Kazası	Emre Grafson	
19 September 2000	Peşindeyim	Emre Grafson	
5 April 2002	Aşkın Nur Yengi	Emre Grafson	
12 October 2004	Yasemin Yağmurları	Marşandiz	
6 November 2007	Aşk'ın Şarkıları	Emre Grafson	
5 January 2010	Gözümün Bebeği	Emre Grafson	
8 November 2016	Aşk'tan Olsa Gerek (EP)	Sony/Columbia	

=== Singles ===
- "Peşindeyim" (2000)
- "Allah'tan Kork" (with Mehmet Erdem) (2019)
- "Baba" (2020)

== Filmography ==
=== Theater ===
- Kadıncıklar (2001)

=== Documentaries ===
- Kurtuluş

=== Series ===
- Olacak O Kadar Televizyonu, (2001)
- Cesur Kuşku
- Bayanlar Baylar

=== Movies ===
- Ömerçip

=== TV programs ===
- Altın Adımlar Yarışması - (TRT)

== Awards ==
- 1987 – Kuşadası Golden Pigeon Song Contest
- 1988 – International Antalya Golden Orange Film Festival
- 1989 – Çeşme Music Festival
