= Seden Gürel =

Turkish singer and songwriter (born 1965)

- Born: Nadire Seden Kutlubay; 12 September 1965 (age 60)
- Origin: Ankara, Turkey
- Genres: Pop
- Occupation: Singer
- Years active: 1986–present
- Labels: Raks Müzik (1992–1994); Plaza Müzik (1996); İrem Records (2002–2008)

Seden Gürel (born 12 September 1965) is a Turkish singer.

She studied at Bahariye Middle school and Kadıköy Anatolian High School. Later she studied architecture at Istanbul Technical University. She made her first recording at the age of 14. She has released seven albums in total.

She was married to the musician, Aykut Gürel for 23 years until their divorce in 2012. On 20 July 2014, she married lawyer Macit Koçer.

== Albums ==
- Bir Yudum Sevgi (1992)
- Aklımı Çelme (1994)
- Muhtemelen (1996)
- Hesaplaşma (2002)
- Bir Kadın Şarkı Söylüyor (2004)
- Maia (Duet with Kerem Cem) (2005)
- Bir Nefes (2008)

== Video clips ==
Year	Single	Album
1992	"Bum Bum"	Bir Yudum Sevgi
1993	"Devlerin Aşkı"	Bir Yudum Sevgi
1993	"Harbiden"	Bir Yudum Sevgi
1993	"Hopterelelli"	Bir Yudum Sevgi
1994	"Olmaz Dostum"	Aklımı Çelme
1994	"Aklımı Çelme"	Aklımı Çelme
1994	"Korkmam"	Aklımı Çelme
1994	"Seni Düşünüyorum"	Aklımı Çelme
1995	"Uyan"	Aklımı Çelme
1995	"Bir Bilsen"	Aklımı Çelme
1995	"Mesela"	Aklımı Çelme
1996	"Çalkala"	Muhtemelen
1997	"Aşkım"	Muhtemelen
2002	"İhanet Kalbime Kötülük Koydu"	Hesaplaşma
2002	"İster Gel, İster Gelme"	Hesaplaşma
2003	"Hesaplaşma"	Hesaplaşma
2003	"Bi' Bulsam"	Hesaplaşma
2003	"Ben Zaten"	Hesaplaşma
2004	"Sebebim Aşk"	Bir Kadın Şarkı Söylüyor
2004	"Kapılar"	Bir Kadın Şarkı Söylüyor
2004	"Parmak İzleri"	Bir Kadın Şarkı Söylüyor
2005	"Küçük Bir Aşk Masalı" (feat. Keremcem)	Maia
2008	"Show Ca La Paris" (Feat. Costi)	Bir Nefes
