= Levent Yüksel =

Turkish musician (born 1964)

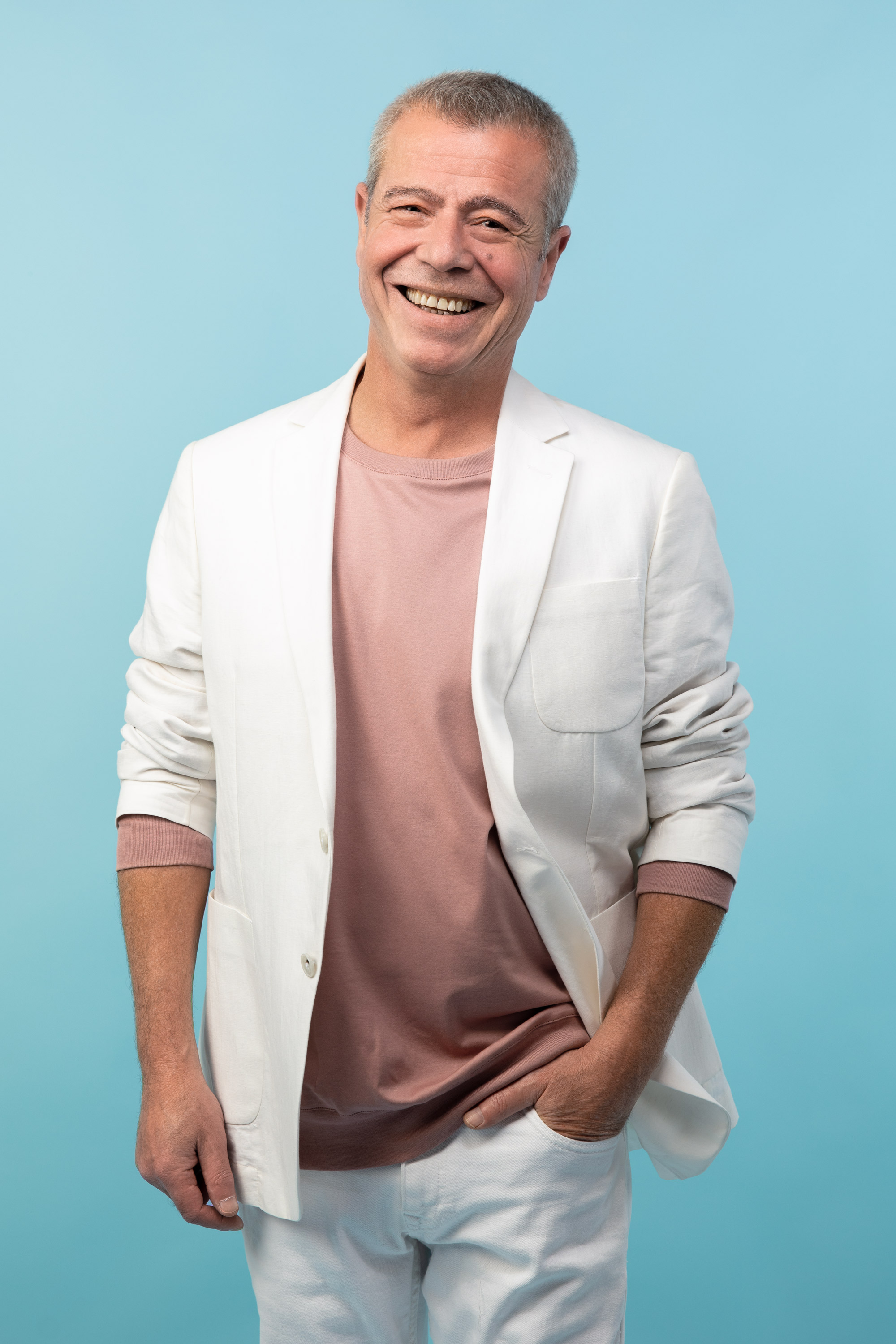
- Yüksel, 2014

Background information
- Born: Levent Uğur Yüksel; October 21, 1964 (age 61); Antalya, Turkey
- Genres: Pop, folk pop, alternative rock, folk, jazz
- Instruments: Bass guitar, guitar, double bass, piano, oud, bağlama, percussion, cümbüş
- Years active: 1986–present
- Labels: Tempa Foneks; Raks Müzik; DMC; ID İletişim; Esen Müzik

Levent Uğur Yüksel (born October 21, 1964) is a Turkish pop singer and multi instrumentalist. He has been active in live music industry since 1993.

== Life ==
Yüksel's interest in the arts and music started at an early age. He started to play violin at the age of five. During his elementary and primary education, he sang in school events. Then he started singing in family and friends' wedding ceremonies. After graduation, he moved from the coastal city Antalya to the city of art, Istanbul, to study music in the Istanbul University State Conservatory (İstanbul Devlet Konservatuarı), and learned to play bass guitar and perform vocals.

== Music career ==
During the beginning of 1990s, Yüksel was known to be one of the best bass guitar players in Turkey. In the year 1993, he released his first album as a pop singer, Med Cezir. The album made a dramatic change in Turkey's pop music taste, as it provided a new voice that has great capability mixed with new style of music. Although he released only 8 music albums as of 2015, his music is spread all over the world and copied in different languages. Young singers and bands starting their music career use his songs in their performances. The melody of Yüksel's 1996 hit "Zalim" was copied in several ad campaigns worldwide.

== Discography ==
=== Albums ===
- 1993: Med Cezir "Tide"
- 1995: Levent Yüksel'in 2. CD'si "Levent Yüksel's 2nd CD"
- 1998: Adı Menekşe "Her name is Violet"
- 2000: Aşkla "with Love"
- 2004: Uslanmadım "I did not settle down"
- 2006: Kadın Şarkıları "Songs for Women"
- 2009: Sıfır Km "Brand-new"
- 2012: Topyekûn "Altogether"
- 2017: Hayatıma Dokunan Şarkılar "Songs that Touch My Life"

=== Music videos ===
1993: Yeter ki Onursuz Olmasın Aşk "As long as Love is not dishonored" 1993: Med Cezir "Tide" 1993: Beni Bırakın "Let Me Go" 1993: Tuana 1993: Dedikodu "Gossip" 1996: Ben Senin Bildiğin Erkeklerden Değilim "I'm not the kind of man you know" 1996: Zalim "Cruel" 1996: Karaağaç (Sezen Aksu ile düet, Aksu videoda da yer aldı) "Karaağaç (duet with Sezen Aksu, Aksu also featured in the video)" 1997: Bi' Daha (Kıvanch K. Versiyonu 1) "One More (Kivanch K. edition 1)" 1997: İmkansız Aşk "Impossible Love" 2005: Yanmışım Ben "I'm Burnt"

=== Singles ===
- 1997: Bi Daha "Again"
- 2010: Aşk Mümkün Müdür Hala "Is Love Still Possible?"
