= Apayrı =

Studio album by Hande Yener
- Released: 6 January 2006
- Studio: Boyaa Music Studios (Hamburg, Germany)
- Genre: Electronic · pop · electropop
- Length: 65:40
- Label: Erol Köse
- Producer: Hande Yener

Hande Yener chronology
Aşk Kadın Ruhundan Anlamıyor (2004)	Apayrı (2006)	Hande Maxi (2006)

Apayrı (Disparate) is the fourth studio album by Turkish singer Hande Yener. It was released on 6 January 2006 by Erol Köse Production. Yener, who created her own style of music in the minds of her listeners and music writers with her first albums, began questioning her works and choices after the release of her third studio album Aşk Kadın Ruhundan Anlamıyor (2004), which caused her unrest. Her dissatisfaction with her songs led her to turn to a different style of music compared to her previous works. Erdem Kınay and Mete Özgencil, who had previously worked on a few number of her songs, prepared a large part of this album and these musicians played a significant role in the development of the album in general.

Apayrı, which is a dance-pop and house album in general, includes various features from different styles in its songs such as funk, R&B, rock and synth-pop. Inspired by dance music styles popular in the United States and Europe in the 1980s, the work was prepared especially under the influence of the music of Madonna, Kylie Minogue and Robbie Williams. Yener changed not only the style of her music but also the lyrics in her songs. The lyrics that were mainly concerned with challenging her beloved in the previous albums were now replaced by more relaxing words and discussed the mutual pain of love in this album. By adopting a new vocal technique in her songs, Yener used more docile and different tones compared to her previous works.

Hande Yener participated in some television programs to promote the album and appeared on stage at various festivals and parties. She also released music videos for three songs in the album. In the first music video "Kelepçe", references were made to the tale of Little Red Riding Hood and the photos taken on the set of the video, in which Yener was surrounded with botanical plants, were also used in the album booklet. The second and third music videos were made for the songs "Aşkın Ateşi" and "Kim Bilebilir Aşkı" respectively. While the first two songs topped many national radio charts in Turkey, the third song was not as successful and only ranked among the top five on the charts. Additionally, the songs "Yola Devam" and "Apayrı", which Yener performed together with Ege Çubukçu in her concerts, both entered the radio charts.

In the year the album came out, some of the music critics praised it, while some found Yener's sudden change of style strange. In the following years, many columnists evaluated the work as the best album of the singer and one of the best recordings of Turkish pop music. Additionally, Yener's next albums were often compared with this album from time to time and were praised based on their similarities to it. Apayrı sold 165,000 copies in total, receiving a gold certification from MÜ-YAP. It won the Best Album award at the 2007 PowerTürk Music Awards. The remixes of some of the songs in it were included in Hande Maxi, released in the same year.

== Background and development ==
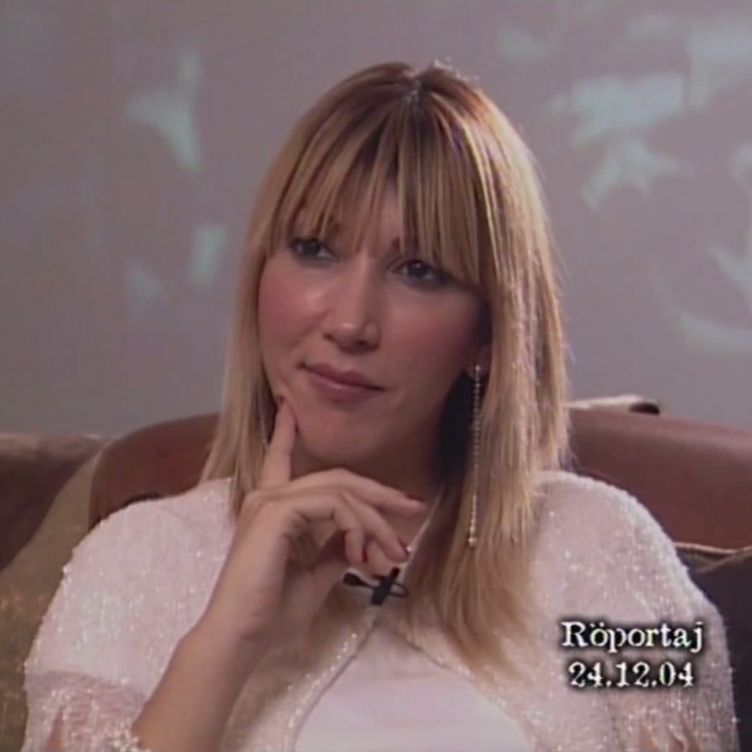
Following the release of Aşk Kadın Ruhundan Anlamıyor (2004), Yener's dissatisfaction with her music style in her previous works led her to try a new style in Apayrı.

After releasing her debut album Senden İbaret (2000), followed by Sen Yoluna... Ben Yoluma... (2002) and Aşk Kadın Ruhundan Anlamıyor (2004), many songwriters and fans started to develop a sense for Yener's preferred musical style. This musical style, which can be seen in many of her initial songs, including "Şansın Bol Olsun", "Küs" and "Kırmızı", consisted of high-speed pop songs that according to some critics were suitable for putting "hands in the air". The real hallmark of these pieces was their lyrics, which were mostly about an ended love after which Yener would be portrayed as a strong woman despite the separation and her hatred for her ex-lover. Emphasizing that the loser after the end of this relationship was the guy, these lyrics constituted the "classic Hande Yener concept" according to Hürriyet Kelebek columnist Sadi Tirak. Altan Çetin, Alper Narman and Fettah Can wrote and composed different pieces that created this concept of "a woman who leaves and doesn't look behind" in her first three albums.

Yener mentioned that with the release of her third album Aşk Kadın Ruhundan Anlamıyor, she now wanted "to have intellectuals among her audience". In an interview in July 2004, Yener announced that Mete Özgencil, with whom she had worked for the first time on a number of songs from her third album and whom she described as a "very intellectual composer", would be much more influential in her next studio album. Additionally, she said that after the release of her third studio album, which included her hit song "Kırmızı", she entered a state of unrest due to her repetitive musical style. When she was looking for songs for her fourth album, she rejected the song "Ya Tutarsa", written and composed by Altan Çetin, as she did not find it suitable for her new work. Çetin, who prepared almost all of the songs in Yener's debut album and contributed to her subsequent albums with various songs, was absent from the new album's repertoire. In the second half of 2005, preparations for her fourth album were intensified, during which she took a break from performing live for seven months.

== Recording ==
Hande Yener recorded the album Apayrı, which she produced herself, in Booya music studios in Hamburg, Germany. Stating that she spent most of her time in the studio during the preparation phase of the album, Yener added that as new things were produced, they determined the general style of the album and then directed their search for compositions according to these newly produced material. Bülent Aris and Erdem Kınay completed audio mixing processes both mutually and individually in different songs. Mastering processes were carried out in Soundgarden and Master & Servant studios in Hamburg. During the recordings, Ayşegül Yağız, Bülent Tekakpınar and Canan Kaplan served as backing vocalists on various songs. Compared to her previous album, Yener's vocal technique in the recordings of this album underwent a significant change. In her own words, compared to her previous works, she stayed "more calm and emphasized the words" and used "different intonations" when singing the songs. Rahşan Gülşan from Sabah Günaydın wrote that "the vocals are kept behind compared to the previous albums". Oben Budak from the same newspaper also noted that the backing track of the pieces were prepared in a way that they suppress the vocals.

== Music and lyrics ==
"People who sing to entertain others [are called 'hands up singers'. ... It is not bad that some of my past songs] are as such, but it is bad not to be able to make people relaxed. Yes, you have fun with 'hands up' songs in a club, but you don't remember them the next day, you don't even want to remember them. And it is not very important who sings these 'hands up' songs, they become popular thanks to their composition. I didn't want this. After a while, I wanted to move to another place."

—Yener talks about the reasons for her sudden change of style in Apayrı.

Apayrı is generally a dance-pop and house album. However, it includes various music styles that vary from song to song. While some songs, especially those in the second half of the album, are under the influence of R&B, others have the effect of styles such as funk, synth-pop and rock. The overall work is inspired by dance music styles that were popular in the United States and Europe in the 1980s, and from this point of view, it was part of the trend of getting inspiration from the 1980s music that was popular around the world in the mid-2000s. Yener also states that the work developed in the "shadow of the music that she was brought up with in the 80s" and was influenced by the music of Madonna, Kylie Minogue and Robbie Williams. She also mentioned that the desire to renew her music and bring it up to "world standards" was also an effective factor in developing the album. She added that the lyrics, which focus on love and relationship themes, had a "softer" style of expression compared to the ones in the previous album. According to Oben Budak from Sabah, who shares the same idea with the singer, the album portrays "the image a strong woman but also has a sharing side [for grief] which says 'I cry [following break-up] but you cry too'." According to Michael Kuyucu, "the daring lover [in the previous albums] has been replaced by a person who misses her loved one and continuously laments for his return." In terms of arrangement, eight songs in the album are arranged by Erdem Kınay, four songs by Bülent Aris and Devrim Karaoğlu, and two songs by Genco Arı. Yener included these arrangers in the album to "catch the sounds of foreign music in Turkish songs."

The opening track, "Yola Devam", is an electronic dance piece written and composed by Ertuğ Ergin that starts with the lyrics "Yıkıldığın her an (Every time you fall) / Yok olmadığına şükret (be thankful that you are not destroyed) / Kalk, aynalara bak (get up, look in the mirrors)" and continues with the theme of holding onto life. In the second place comes the song "Apayrı", the album's namesake, which is written and composed by Mete Özgencil and features R&B elements. The ensuing track "Nasıl Zor Şimdi" was also written by Özgencil and its lyrics are about an internal reckoning before starting a new relationship. A rock effect with drums is given to its composition which also has synth-pop elements. "Kelepçe", written by Alper Narman and Fettah Can and composed by Bülent Aris, takes the fourth place on the tracking list with its club version, and also the fourteenth place with its clip version. Generally considered a dance song, its club version, arranged by Erdem Kınay, has dominant guitar sounds while the clip version, arranged by Bülent Aris, features sounds of string instruments.

The lyrics and composition of the fifth song, "Kim Bilebilir Aşkı", were prepared by Ertuğ Ergin. After the introduction that starts with saxophone sounds, the song continues with funky house rhythms and the side flute sounds come into play in the middle instrumental part. Its lyrics speak of love as an unknown phenomenon until death. The following song, "Bugün Sevgililer Günü", was written by the duo Narman and Can and composed by Erdem Kınay. It has a lower rhythm compared to the songs that precede it in the album, and its lyrics state that being alone on Valentine's Day doesn't necessarily matter or mean anything. Four consecutive pieces, from the seventh song "Şefkat Gibi" to the tenth song "Unut", were all prepared by Özgencil. The lyrics of "Şefkat Gibi", which starts with the sounds of the guitar, are mainly about an evaluation on the terminated relationship of a person who suddenly comes across her ex-lover. It is followed by "Aşkın Ateşi", a pop song with a short rap section at the end.

The ninth song's title, "Kanat", is taken from one part of its lyrics "yalnızlık özgürlüğün iki hırçın kanadıdır. (Loneliness makes the two vicious wings of freedom.)" Arranged by Bülent Aris and Devrim Karaoğlu, the song features guitar sounds. Similar to "Kanat", the next song "Unut" has R&B rhythms and was arranged by Aris and Karaoğlu. Its lyrics, reminiscent of a nursery rhyme, recommend forgetting "[everything] before going to bed every night (her gece yatmadan önce)." The eleventh song, "Düş Bozumu", written and composed by Can Şambelli and Ender Gündüzlü, is one of the low-tempo songs of the album. Its composition includes guitar sounds as well as rhodes piano and flugelhorn sounds. "Sakin Olmalıyım" comes next, a fast-paced rock song written and composed by Özgencil. The thirteenth song on the album, "Sorma", is written and composed by the duo Narman and Can. Its lyrics are about betrayal and it was arranged by Genco Arı and has a low rhythm. The last song, "İnsanlar Çok", written and composed by the soloist of the Rebel Moves group Erol Çay, is a house song and features Yener's vocal recordings with an effect created by vocoder.

== Cover and design ==
Apayrı's album cover and booklet were predominantly green. The album photos were taken by Simon Henwood, the director of the music video for the lead single "Kelepçe", and the booklet was designed by Henwood and his team, using features from the botanical set in the music video. A close-up photo of Yener looking towards the ground was used on the cover; the background of this photo featured a section of botanical plants decorated with light effects. In the photos, Yener wore a dress decorated with white stones and supplemented with a black tulle in the chest area resembling a butterfly. The photographs, in which she posed in a thoughtful manner, were used in the album booklet with a blurring effect. Her new hairstyle and hair color in the photographs were compared by various journalists to those of actress Sibel Kekilli. Writers of the Günaydın column on Sabah newspaper wrote that in the year in which the album came out, dark hair colors such as brown and black were fashionable and artists like Yener started to prefer dark hair colors one after another. Michael Kuyucu stated that in the album photos he saw "a dull expression and a thoughtful Hande Yener". The Gerçek Pop website wrote that "photographs that seem to have been taken with a mobile phone have become a significant part of the album."

== Release and promotion ==
The release date for Apayrı was announced in the last days of December 2005 and the album was released on 6 January 2006 by Erol Köse Production in CD and cassette formats in Turkey's music markets. Around that date, various advertisements were broadcast on the television channels promoting the work. The production company aimed to increase sales by setting the price of CDs and cassettes as ₺7.5 in contrast to the general sales prices of ₺10–12 in the market. The increasing use of the Internet was an important factor for this sudden price reduction, as with the music piracy on rise the audience would not spend money to buy albums anymore. On the D&R Best-Selling chart, which was prepared according to CD and cassette sales, the album ranked first. For six consecutive weeks, it also topped the Local CD Bestsellers chart, which was published and organized by the Milliyet newspaper. The album sold 165,000 by the end of the year and received a gold certification from MÜ-YAP. This marked the third consecutive time that an album by Yener was certificated by MÜ-YAP. Additionally, the album was awarded as the Best Album at the 2007 PowerTürk Music Awards. On the other hand, due to the overall performance of the album, Yener was nominated in the Best Pop Female Artist category at both the 2007 PowerTürk Music Awards and the 13th Kral TV Video Music Awards.

=== Music videos ===
Three songs from the album were turned into music videos. The first music video was produced for the song "Kelepçe" and directed by Simon Henwood. It was shot in London and began to be broadcast on television following the album's release. Henwood was influenced by the lyrics "Bu kız saf, kötülük yok içinde (This girl is pure, there is no evil inside her)" while working on the video's script. Inspired by the story of Little Red Riding Hood, in the video Yener appears in a red cape and fights with evil spirits in the forest-like set created with botanical plants. Yaşar Çakmak from Milliyet newspaper wrote that the music video was "surprisingly similar" to Róisín Murphy's "If We're in Love" (Ruby Blue, 2005) and the reason was that both music videos were directed by the same person. "Kelepçe" topped the pop charts of many national radios in Turkey.

The second music video was shot in a seaside town near Rome for the song "Aşkın Ateşi" following a survey conducted on Yener's website by fans. The music video, which was released in May 2006, was directed by Luca Tommassini who had previously worked with Yener while directing the music video for "Acele Etme". The video features Yener having fun with her dancers on the beach, while one of Dolce & Gabbana's models from that year appeared in it as her partner. Tolga Akyıldız from Hürriyet the song found "far from the general style of the album" and found it "more commercial compared to the general repertoire", but its still managed to top many national pop charts. It also received a nomination for the Best Song award at the 2007 PowerTürk Music Awards.

The third and last music video was made for the song "Kim Bilebilir Aşkı" and released in August 2006. Just like the previous one, it was directed by Luca Tommassini and recorded at his house in Rome. In the video, Yener wore handmade and hand-painted geisha costumes, and its theme was concerned with demonstrating the pain of love in parallel to the lyrics. "Kim Bilebilir Aşkı" performed poorly on national radios compared to the first two songs, and was among the top 5 on various radio charts. Aside from the three songs for which separate music videos were released, "Yola Devam" and "Apayrı" managed to make their way into some national radio charts.

=== Live performances ===
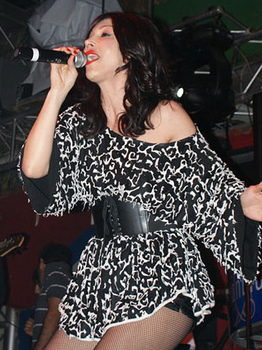
Yener performing in Marmaris in May 2009.

Hande Yener participated in various television programs throughout the year to promote Apayrı and gave concerts at various festivals and parties. She performed some songs from the album for the first time on the night of 31 December 2005 at a New Year party in a hotel in Şişli. On 10 January 2006, she was a guest on a special episode of the TV program Gece Gündüz, presented by Yekta Kopan on NTV. On 4 February, she appeared in Okan Bayülgen's program Televizyon Makinası on Kanal D and shared information about the album with the audience and performed a number of her new songs. While performing the songs "Kelepçe" and "Apayrı", she was accompanied by Ege Çubukçu who rapped with her on stage. During her performance of the song "Yola Devam", she appeared on the stage with the song's writer Ertuğ Ergin. Çubukçu later accompanied Yener on the same song at the promotional concert of the album, which took place on 10 March at the TİM Show Center in Maslak. On 11 April, she took the stage at the Lütfi Kırdar Convention Center during the promotion ceremony for the third generation of Renault Clio. On 21 April, she appeared on Beyazıt Öztürk's talk show program, Beyaz Show, and performed various songs from the album. On 12 May, she gave a concert at Khasfest 2006, the spring festival organized by Kadir Has University. On 20 May, she took the stage at the youth festival organized by Doritos in Maslak called Unifest. On 9 June, she started performing in the summer party series Ice & Dance organized by Nescafé. Yener took the stage with Tan Sağtürk and his dance team in these parties, which continued throughout the summer months in various cities in Antalya, İzmir and Muğla. On 20 July, she performed at the 19th Tea and Tourism Festival in Rize in front of about 65 thousand people.

After a few months of preparation, her concert at the Cemil Topuzlu Open-Air Theatre in Harbiye occurred on 11 August. For the opening act, she performed the song "İnsanlar Çok" and used images from the Arab–Israeli conflict and the Iraq War in the background. Yener appeared on the stage alongside dancers from the contest Benimle Dans Eder misin?, and again performed the song "Apayrı" together with Ege Çubukçu. Instead of an orchestra, which was on stage in her previous concerts, two DJ mixers and Macintosh computers were used at the Harbiye concert, and Yener performed her songs with electronic mixes. On 9 September, she gave a concert at Rumelihisarı.

== Critical reception ==
Apayrı received mostly positive reviews from music critics and was named among the best albums of Yener's career. While the dance-style infrastructures of the pieces and Yener's collaboration with other artists on the album were generally appreciated and praised, reactions to her new musical style were mixed. Some writers found the sudden change in the singer's musical style strange, but some had a positive reaction to it, finding it successful. In his book Eleştirmenin Günlüğü 2006, music critic Naim Dilmener praised the album and said, "Apayrı has been a different Hande Yener album; the reason for this is Mete Özgencil and Erdem Kınay. ... Yener has sung different songs and demonstrated different worlds [in this album]. In this atmosphere, even the 'Kelepçe' ('Handcuff') of Alper Narman and Fettah Can – who always write songs with the same style – doesn't make us bored." Writing for Sabah, Oben Budak commented positively on the work, adding "While Pop is going through a vicious circle that doesn't astonish anyone, Hande is constantly choosing a new way to renew herself and her music, regardless of the whole [community]." Similarly, Can Sayın from the same newspaper said, "Every song has a different musical structure, different interpretation and a different joy." Tolga Akyıldız from Hürriyet wrote that the album, which he believed was "entirely based on Western dance infrastructures", would be a turning point in Yener's career and praised the overall work as "much more complete and brave" compared to Yener's previous albums.

Writing for the Günaydın supplement of Sabah newspaper, columnist Rahşan Gülşan was disappointed with Yener's change of style, and found her new vocal techniques strange, adding that the "Hande image" created through the years was ignored. However, she found the album itself and Özgencil's lyrics and Kınay's arrangements successful, stating "If this was not a Hande Yener album, we would have witnessed the birth of a brand new alternative star." Ayşe Özyılmazel from the same newspaper had a similar reaction in the article she published on the album, titled "Yener hayranlarına ihanet" ("Yener betraying her fans"), and added "I cannot understand why a person would want to erase her well-established image and her musical style that makes young people bounce up and down. Forget the likes of 'Kırmızı', 'Küs', and 'Sen Yoluna Ben Yoluma' songs [with this album]." Writing for Gala magazine, radioman Michael Kuyucu also criticized Yener's change of musical style and her "docile" vocal techniques. While evaluating the album as a "light stumble" in her career, he stated that the songs contained "a perfect sound, vocal and clean tone".

== Legacy ==
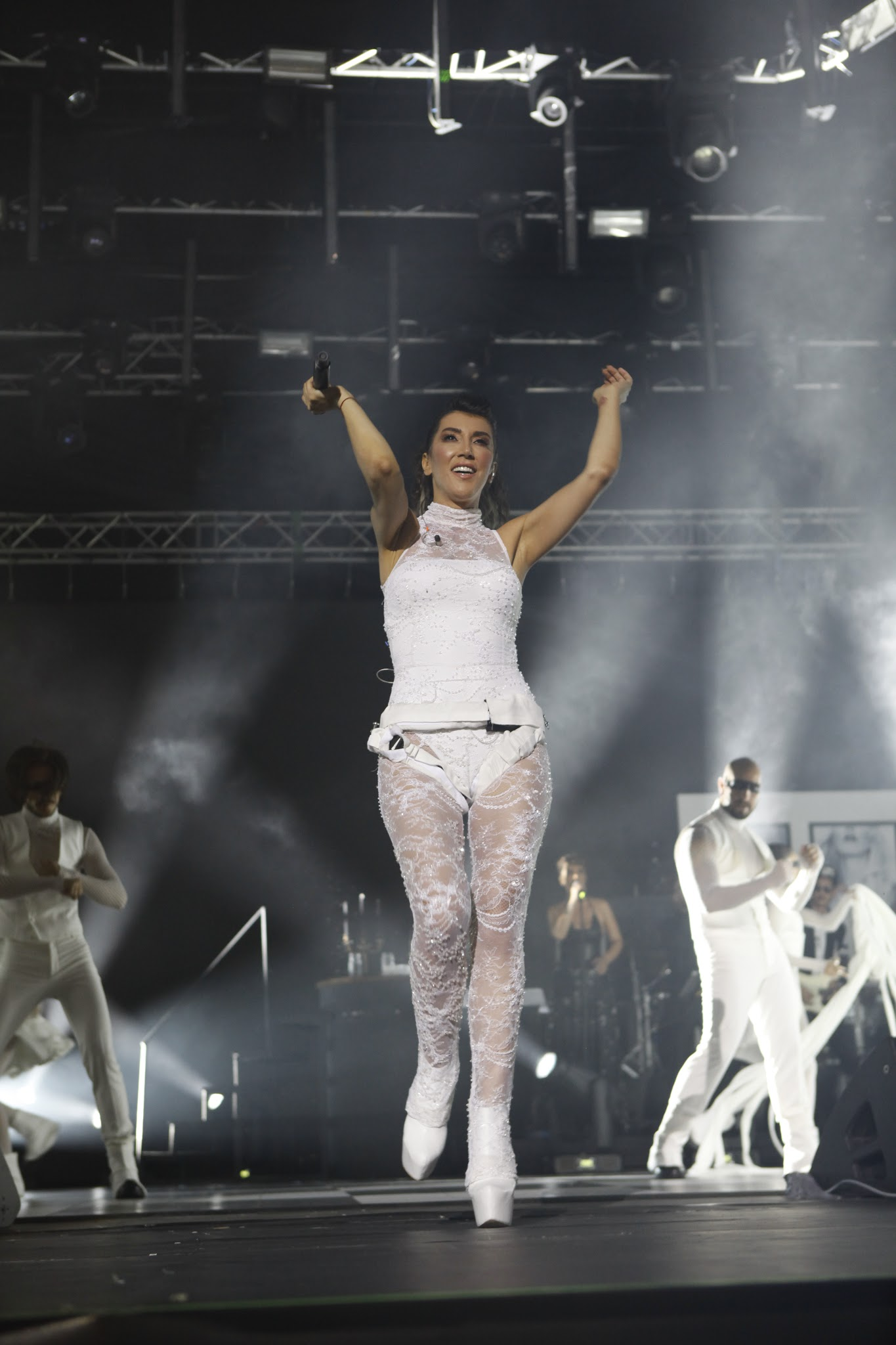
Yener performing at the Cemil Topuzlu Open-Air Theatre in July 2015. Her subsequent works were often compared with Apayrı.

Apayrı, which initially received negative reviews by those who were waiting for something similar to Yener's previous albums, was later cited as Yener's best album by a number of music critics. Evaluating the album's performance in the year it was released, Michael Kuyucu wrote, "It sounded a little bit stupid, but it did not fully affect the artist. Because the community and radios featured songs from the album like "Aşkın Ateşi", "Yola Devam" and "Kim Bilebilir Aşkı", which resembled her previous hits and continued its path in full spate." Yener herself made a similar statement by mentioning that the album was "not well-received initially", but later some of its songs like "Kelepçe", "Kim Bilebilir Aşkı", and "Aşkın Ateşi" became hits. Tolga Akyıldız evaluated the album and wrote, "It wasn't a sound that could be easily accepted by former Hande Yener fans. They did not accept it anyway. Potential Hande Yener listeners, who might have been interested in the new sound, abstained [from buying it] due to the old image of Hande [that they had in their mind]."

Sarp Dakni from Radikal evaluated the work as "one of the revolutionary albums in the history of modern Turkish pop music." Writing for Dikkat Müzik website, radioman Olcay Tanberken described Apayrı as "an exceptional above-the-line album which that had its name carved in both Yener's career and Turkish pop music." Gerçek Pop website named Apayrı and Nasıl Delirdim? (2007) as works that made the "turning point" in Yener's career, and further praised the two albums by describing them as "two of the most remarkable albums in Turkish music history." Mayk Şişman from Milliyet also described it as "Yener's best album". In December 2009, Apayrı was chosen as the sixth best album of the past decade by Ceyhun Altıok in the 2000s Best Albums list released on NTVMSNBC.com. In February 2017, it ranked sixth on the list of Revolutionary Albums of Our Pop History prepared by Habertürk's Oben Budak. Kaos GL's Bawer Çakır wrote that the album made a positive contribution to Yener's image among the LGBT.

Also, comments were made that the album paved the way for Demet Akalın's career, with whom Yener was in a feud for many years. Oben Budak wrote that Demet Akalın took the "job of singing 'hands in the air' [or common dance-pop] songs" as Yener differentiated her style and this was one of the factors that contributed to Akalın's fame. Tolga Akyıldız noticed that after the release of this album, many concerts in the holiday resorts were given to Akalın instead of Yener. Naim Dilmener also noted that with the release of her album Kusursuz 19 in the same year, Akalın "intends to become the new Hande Yener" and added, "If Hande Yener did not push aside the magnificent pop songs of Altan Çetin because of her decision to make electronic music, maybe Akalın would not have even been able to shine. [With her taking a break from pop music] A space was created for Demet Akalın."

Some columnists compared the album with Yener's new works in the following years. This was especially the case when she started making pop music again after releasing electronic music albums for three years. Onur Baştürk from Hürriyet was among those who made these comparisons. He believed that the album Hande'ye Neler Oluyor? (2010) had the "same taste as Apayrı" and for him "Aşk Tohumu" (2019) was a reminder of Yener's works from "Apayrı times." From the same newspaper, Hikmet Demirkol wrote that he was disappointed that Teşekkürler (2011), Kraliçe (2012) and Mükemmel (2014) "did not have the same taste as Apayrı" and added that "it is now a habit to expect similar tastes in every new album from Yener." Serhat Tekin, also from the same newspaper, indicated that he found Yener's new album Carpe Diem (2020) successful by describing it as the "2020 version of Apayrı." In his review for the song "Pencere" (2020), Mayk Şişman wrote a favorable review and praised it "as if it is a forgotten song from Apayrı."

== Track listing ==
No.	Title	Writer(s)	Composer(s)	Length
1.	"Yola Devam"	Ertuğ Ergin	Ertuğ Ergin	4:25
2.	"Apayrı"	Mete Özgencil	Mete Özgencil	4:00
3.	"Nasıl Zor Şimdi"	Mete Özgencil	Mete Özgencil	4:18
4.	"Kelepçe" (Club Version)	Alper Narman; Fettah Can	Bülent Aris	5:07
5.	"Kim Bilebilir Aşkı"	Ertuğ Ergin	Ertuğ Ergin	5:01
6.	"Bugün Sevgililer Günü"	Alper Narman; Fettah Can	Erdem Kınay	4:24
7.	"Şefkat Gibi"	Mete Özgencil	Mete Özgencil	4:07
8.	"Aşkın Ateşi"	Mete Özgencil	Mete Özgencil	3:52
9.	"Kanat"	Mete Özgencil	Mete Özgencil	4:08
10.	"Unut"	Mete Özgencil	Mete Özgencil	2:43
11.	"Düş Bozumu"	Can Şambelli; Ender Gündüzlü	Can Şambelli; Ender Gündüzlü	4:25
12.	"Sakin Olmalıyım"	Mete Özgencil	Mete Özgencil	3:42
13.	"Sorma"	Alper Narman; Fettah Can	Alper Narman; Fettah Can	5:16
14.	"Kelepçe" (Clip Version)	Alper Narman; Fettah Can	Bülent Aris	3:48
15.	"İnsanlar Çok"	Erol Çay	Erol Çay	6:24
Total length:				65:40

== Personnel ==
Credits adapted from Apayrı's album booklet.

- Hande Yener – vocals (all songs), producer
- Mete Özgencil – songwriter (2, 3, 7–10, 12), composer (2, 3, 7–10, 12)
- Ertuğ Ergin – songwriter (1, 5), composer (1, 5)
- Alper Narman – songwriter (4, 6, 13, 14), composer (13)
- Fettah Can – songwriter (4, 6, 13, 14), composer (13)
- Can Şambelli – songwriter (11), composer (11)
- Ender Gündüzlü – songwriter (11), composer (11)
- Erol Çay – songwriter (15), composer (15)
- Erdem Kınay – arranger (1–6, 8, 15), composer (6), mixing (1–6, 8, 15)
- Bülent Aris – arranger (7, 9, 10, 12, 14), composer (4, 14), mixing (1–14)
- Devrim Karaoğlu – arranger (7, 9, 10, 12)
- Genco Arı – arranger (11, 13), bass guitar (11, 13), fender rhodes (11, 13)
- Rene "Greco" Krüger – arranger (7), piano (7)
- Burak Gültekin – acoustic guitar (11)
- Fontaine Burnet – bass guitar (7)
- Dirk Sengotta – drum (12)
- Andreas "Spok" Bock – drum recording (13)
- Halil İbrahim Işık – flugelhorn (11), trumpet (13)
- Jörg Sander – guitar (7, 9, 10, 12, 14)
- Sarp Maden – guitar (13)
- Thierry Paul – guitar (4)
- Ayşegül Yağız – backing vocals (11, 13)
- Bülent Tekakpınar – backing vocals (11, 13)
- Canan Kaplan – backing vocals (2, 5)
- Ebru & Elçin – backing vocals (2, 5)
- Soundgarden – mastering
- Master & Servant – mastering
- Simon Henwoood – photographer
- Gow Tanaka – hair
- Helen Asher – make-up
- Brooke Neilson – stylist
- Exposure Films – design
- Sanem Canik Habib – creativity consultant
- Erol Köse – executive producer, project director
- Şermin Ekinci – project coordination, management
- Funda Düşgör – PR
- CM – printing

== Charts ==
Chart (2006)	Peak position
Turkey (D&R Best-Selling)	1
Turkey (Milliyet Local CD Best Sellers)	1

== Certifications and sales ==
Country	Certification	Sales
Turkey (MÜ-YAP)	Gold	165,000

== Release history ==
Country	Date	Format(s)	Label	Ref.
Turkey	6 January 2006	CD; MC; digital download	Erol Köse Production	
Worldwide	7 May 2006	Digital download	Erol Köse Production	
Turkey	3 May 2012	CD (reissue)	Erol Köse Production	
Turkey	19 June 2012	CD (reissue)	Erol Köse Production	
Turkey	4 June 2014	Digital download	Doğan Music Company	
Worldwide	4 June 2014	Digital download	Doğan Music Company	
