= Alper Narman =

Turkish songwriter

- Other names: Boaz Aldujeli
- Occupations: Songwriter; music arranger
- Musical career
- Genres: Dance; electronic; pop
- Years active: 2000–present

Alper Narman is a Turkish songwriter. Narman has worked with numerous Turkish pop music artists including Hande Yener, Simge, Ayşe Hatun Önal, Edis, Hadise, İzel and Işın Karaca. In 2000s, he mainly worked together with Fettah Can, and in 2010s he collaborated with Onurr on a number of mutual works.

== Songs written and composed by Narman ==
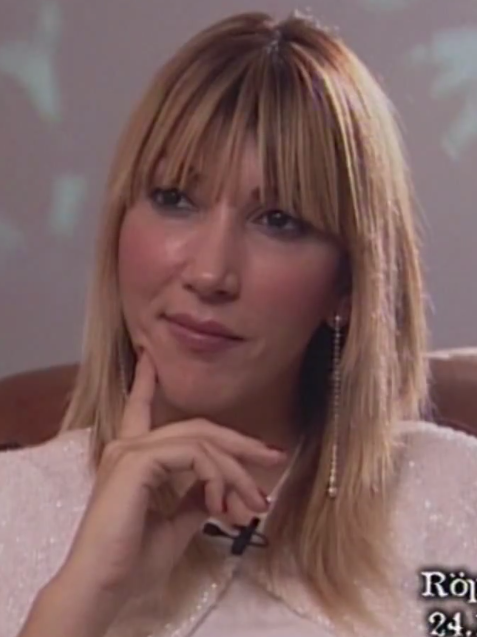
In the early 2000s, Narman wrote and composed many songs that appeared in the early works of Hande Yener.

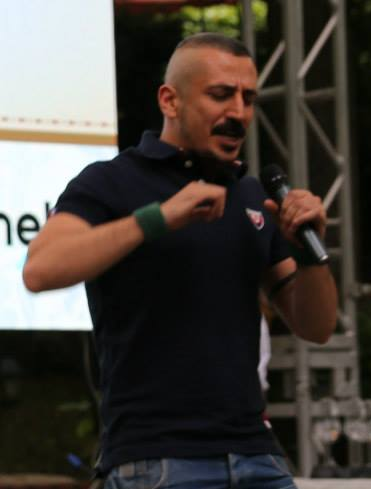
In 2010s, Onurr wrote and composed many songs together with Alper Narman.

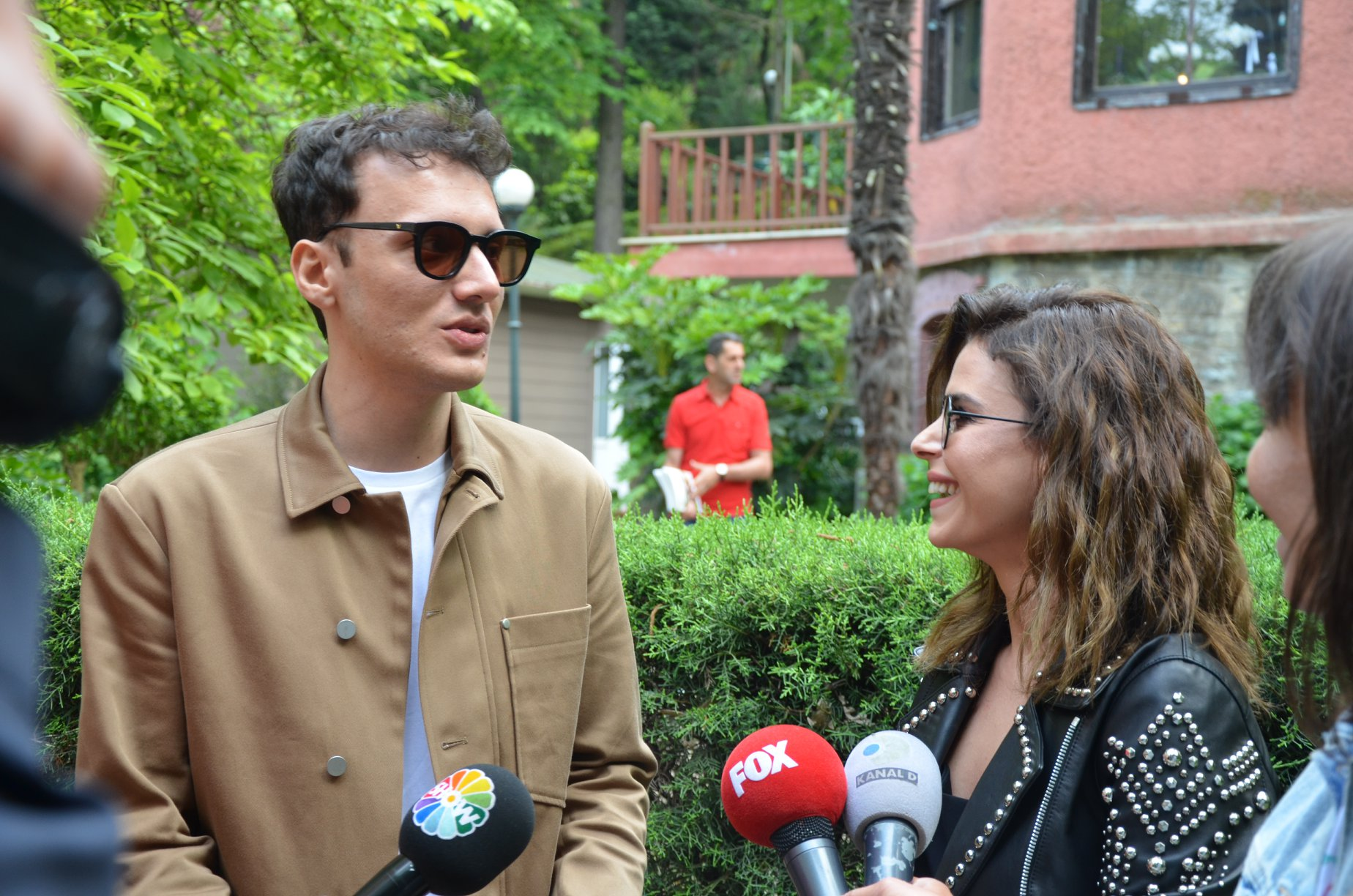
Many of Narman's songs and compositions appeared in Edis (left) and Simge's (right) albums.

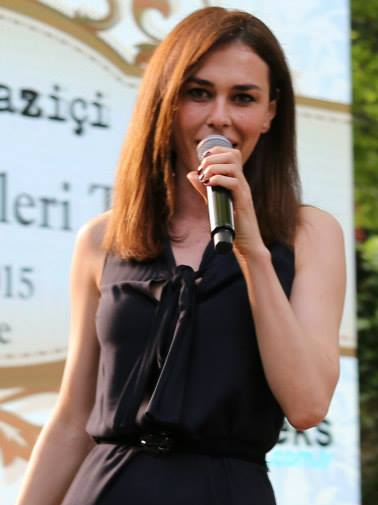
Ayşe Hatun Önal went on to collaborate with Onurr and Narman on several singles.

Year	Singer	Album	Song	Other writer(s)	Ref(s)
2001	Gülşen	Şimdi	"Bu Aşk Adam Olmaz"	—	
2001	Gülşen	Şimdi	"Sebebsiz Değil"	Gülşen	
2002	Hande Yener	Sen Yoluna... Ben Yoluma...	"Şansın Bol Olsun"	Fettah Can	
2002	Hande Yener	Sen Yoluna... Ben Yoluma...	"Üzgünüm O Kadın Ben Değilim"	Fettah Can	
2002	Hande Yener	Sen Yoluna... Ben Yoluma...	"Küs"	Fettah Can	
2002	Hande Yener	Sen Yoluna... Ben Yoluma...	"Evlilik Sandalı"	Fettah Can	
2002	Hande Yener	Sen Yoluna... Ben Yoluma...	"Elin Diline Sakız Ederim"	Fettah Can	
2002	Hande Yener	Sen Yoluna... Ben Yoluma...	"Sözün Söz müdür?"	Fettah Can	
2002	Hande Yener	Sen Yoluna... Ben Yoluma...	"Hadi Geçmiş Olsun"	Fettah Can	
2002	Hande Yener	Sen Yoluna... Ben Yoluma...	"32 Kısım"	Fettah Can	
2002	Hande Yener	Sen Yoluna... Ben Yoluma...	"Bakarım Keyfime"	Fettah Can	
2002	Hande Yener	Sen Yoluna... Ben Yoluma...	"Bana Olanlar"	Fettah Can	
2002	Hande Yener	Sen Yoluna... Ben Yoluma...	"Kazanamadık"	Fettah Can	
2004	Hande Yener	Aşk Kadın Ruhundan Anlamıyor	"Bedenim Senin Oldu"	Fettah Can	
2004	Hande Yener	Aşk Kadın Ruhundan Anlamıyor	"Bu Yüzden"	Fettah Can	
2004	Hande Yener	Aşk Kadın Ruhundan Anlamıyor	"24 Saat"	Fettah Can	
2004	Hande Yener	Aşk Kadın Ruhundan Anlamıyor	"Armağan"	Fettah Can; Sezen Aksu	
2004	Hande Yener	Aşk Kadın Ruhundan Anlamıyor	"Yanındaki Var Ya"	Fettah Can	
2004	Hande Yener	Aşk Kadın Ruhundan Anlamıyor	"Acı Veriyor"	Fettah Can	
2004	Hande Yener	Aşk Kadın Ruhundan Anlamıyor	"Acısı Çıkıyor"	Fettah Can	
2004	Hande Yener	Aşk Kadın Ruhundan Anlamıyor	"Savaş Sonrası"	Fettah Can	
2004	Hande Yener	Aşk Kadın Ruhundan Anlamıyor	"Bence Mutluyduk"	Fettah Can	
2004	Hande Yener	Aşk Kadın Ruhundan Anlamıyor	"Aşk Kadın Ruhundan Anlamıyor"	Fettah Can	
2006	Hande Yener	Apayrı	"Sorma"	Fettah Can	
2006	Gülben Ergen	Gülben Ergen	"Yalnızlık"	Fettah Can	
2006	Gülben Ergen	Gülben Ergen	"Nihayet"	Fettah Can	
2006	Işın Karaca	Başka 33/3	"Aradığım Aşk"	Fettah Can	
2006	Işın Karaca	Başka 33/3	"Lambalı Radyo"	Fettah Can	
2006	Işın Karaca	Başka 33/3	"Mandalinalar"	Fettah Can	
2006	Işın Karaca	Başka 33/3	"Ayrı Ayrı"	Fettah Can	
2006	Işın Karaca	Başka 33/3	"Bedava Öylesine"	Fettah Can	
2006	Işın Karaca	Başka 33/3	"İki Eksi Bir"	Fettah Can	
2006	Işın Karaca	Başka 33/3	"Bye Bye"	Fettah Can	
2010	Mercan	Sana Değil Kardeşine	"Derin Uykular"	—	
2012	İzel	Aşk En Büyüktür Her Zaman	"Amerika"	Onurr	
2012	İzel	Aşk En Büyüktür Her Zaman	"Drakula"	Onurr	
2012	İzel	Aşk En Büyüktür Her Zaman	"İyi Ki Doğdun"	Onurr	
2012	İzel	Aşk En Büyüktür Her Zaman	"Düşer O"	Onurr	
2012	İzel	Aşk En Büyüktür Her Zaman	"Oh Olsun"	Onurr	
2012	İzel	Aşk En Büyüktür Her Zaman	"Solmuş Gül Kasabası"	Onurr	
2012	İzel	Aşk En Büyüktür Her Zaman	"Rezil"	Onurr	
2012	İzel	Aşk En Büyüktür Her Zaman	"Hicran"	Onurr	
2012	İzel	Aşk En Büyüktür Her Zaman	"İmdat"	Onurr	
2012	İzel	Aşk En Büyüktür Her Zaman	"Yaz Geldi"	Onurr	
2012	İzel	Aşk En Büyüktür Her Zaman	"Göz Göre Göre"	Onurr	
2012	İzel	Aşk En Büyüktür Her Zaman	"İlk Yara"	Onurr	
2014	Ayşe Hatun Önal	Selam Dengesiz	"Çak Bir Selam"	Onurr	
2014	Hadise	Tavsiye	"Nerdesin Aşkım?"	Onurr	
2014	Hadise	Tavsiye	"Tokat"	Onurr	
2014	Simge	—	"Bip Bip"	Onurr	
2015	Ayşe Hatun Önal	Selam Dengesiz	"Güm Güm"	Ayşe Hatun Önal; Onurr	
2016	Ayşe Hatun Önal	Selam Dengesiz	"Şeytan Tüyü"	Gürsel Çelik; Onurr	
2016	İrem Derici	Dantel	"Aşk, Kışlıkları Giy"	Onurr	
2016	Murat Boz	Janti	"Janti"	Gürsel Çelik; Onurr	
2016	Tuğba Yurt	—	"Güç Bende Artık"	Onurr	
2016	Ayşe Hatun Önal	Selam Dengesiz	"Sirenler"	Onurr	
2017	Ayşe Hatun Önal	Selam Dengesiz	"Cehennem"	Onurr	
2017	Onurr	Bir Kahramanlık Hikayesi	"Derviş"	Onurr; Sezen Aksu	
2017	Onurr	Bir Kahramanlık Hikayesi	"Replik"	Onurr	
2017	Onurr	Bir Kahramanlık Hikayesi	"Şampiyon Benim Bence"	Onurr	
2017	Onurr	Bir Kahramanlık Hikayesi	"Yakıyosun"	Onurr	
2017	Onurr	Bir Kahramanlık Hikayesi	"Hu"	Onurr	
2017	Onurr	Bir Kahramanlık Hikayesi	"Aşk Kışlıkları Giy"	Onurr	
2017	Onurr	Bir Kahramanlık Hikayesi	"Ağlayamam"	Onurr	
2017	Onurr	Bir Kahramanlık Hikayesi	"Yediğim Vurgun"	Onurr; Sezen Aksu	
2017	Hadise	Şampiyon	"Şampiyon"	Onurr	
2017	Edis	Ân	"Çok Çok"	Edis Görgülü; Onurr	
2018	Edis	Ân	"Yalan"	Edis Görgülü; Onurr	
2018	Edis	Ân	"Doldur İçelim"	Edis Görgülü; Onurr	
2018	Simge	Ben Bazen	"İster İnan İster İnanma"	Onurr	
2018	Hilal Cebeci	—	"Fokur Fokur"	Onurr	
2018	İrem Derici	Sabıka Kaydı	"Sevmek Bizim İşimiz"	Onurr	
2019	İzel	Kendiliğinden Olmalı	"Fersah"	Onurr	
2019	İzel	Kendiliğinden Olmalı	"Yas Mühürümdür"	Onurr	
2022	Murat Boz	—	"Harbi Güzel"	Ozan Bayraşa, Ömer Akkaya, Mert Çodur, Reşit Özkaplan, Ali Barış Ata	

== Songs written by Narman ==
Year	Singer	Album	Song	Other writer(s)	Ref(s)
2006	Hande Yener	Apayrı	"Kelepçe"	Fettah Can	
2006	Hande Yener	Apayrı	"Bugün Sevgililer Günü"	Fettah Can	
2006	Hande Yener	Hande Maxi	"Biraz Özgürlük"^{[note]}	—	
2006	Hande Yener	Hande Maxi	"Deri Eldiven"	—	
2007	Hande Yener	Nasıl Delirdim?	"Ne Yaparsın?"^{[note]}	Hande Yener	
2007	Hande Yener	Nasıl Delirdim?	"Romeo"^{[note]}	Hande Yener	
2007	Hande Yener	Nasıl Delirdim?	"Fırtına"^{[note]}	Hande Yener	
2007	Hande Yener	Nasıl Delirdim?	"Şu An Erken"^{[note]}	Hande Yener	
2007	Hande Yener	Nasıl Delirdim?	"Nasıl Delirdim?"^{[note]}	Hande Yener	
2007	Hande Yener	Nasıl Delirdim?	"Kurtar Beni"^{[note]}	—	
2007	Hande Yener	Nasıl Delirdim?	"Kötülük"^{[note]}	—	
2007	Hande Yener	Nasıl Delirdim?	"Aşkın Gücü"^{[note]}	Hande Yener	
2007	Hande Yener	Nasıl Delirdim?	"Seni Sevi... yorumlar Yok"^{[note]}	Hande Yener	
2010	Mercan	Sana Değil Kardeşine	"Sana Değil Kardeşine"	—	
2010	Mercan	Sana Değil Kardeşine	"Hepsi Gay"	—	
2010	Mercan	Sana Değil Kardeşine	"Cowboy"	—	
2010	Mercan	Sana Değil Kardeşine	"Sexy"	—	
2011	Hadise	Aşk Kaç Beden Giyer?	"Burjuva"	—	
2011	Hadise	Aşk Kaç Beden Giyer?	"Yetenek"	—	
2011	Hadise	Aşk Kaç Beden Giyer?	"Macera"	—	
2011	Simge	Yeni Çıktı	"Issız Ada"	—	
2014	Mustafa Ceceli	Kalpten	"Pervane"	Sezen Aksu	
2014	Mustafa Ceceli	Kalpten	"Askersin"	Sezen Aksu	
2016	Simge	—	"Kamera"	Onurr; Sezen Aksu	
2018	Simge	Ben Bazen	"Pes Etme"	—	
2018	Simge	Ben Bazen	"Kalp Kırmak"	Simge Sağın; Yasemin Özler	
2021	Hadise	—	"Coş Dalgalan"	Reşit Özkaplan; Ali Barış Ata	

== Notes ==
1. He wrote these songs under the name Boaz Aldujeli.
