= 13th Kral TV Video Music Awards =

- Date: Wednesday, May 9, 2007
- Venue: İstanbul Gösteri Merkezi, Istanbul
- Country: Turkey

Highlights
- Most awards: Demet Akalın (2)

Television/radio coverage
- Network: Kral TV

The 13th Kral TV Video Music Awards (Turkish: 13. Kral TV Video Müzik Ödülleri, or 13. Kral TV VMÖ) were organized by Kral TV at the İstanbul Gösteri Merkezi on Wednesday, May 9, 2007. The hosts were Oktay Kaynarca and Özgü Namal.

In previous years, award winners were determined by the vote of a jury. This year, the system changed, and winners were determined by the text message votes that viewers sent from their phones. The artist who won the most awards this year was Demet Akalın.

== Winners and Nominees ==
The award winners and nominees are shown in the table below.

Category	Winner	Other Nominees
Jury's Special Award	Müzeyyen Senar	-
Honorary Awards	Orhan Gencebay, M.F.Ö, Ali Kocatepe	-
Best Female Artist in Turkish Classical Music	Belkıs Özener - Sevemedim Karagözlüm	Emel Sayın - Bir Tatlı Huzur Almaya Geldik Kalamış'tan, Muazzez Ersoy - Gözlerime Bakta Söyle, Şevval Sam - Güzel Bir Göz Beni Attı, Umut Akyürek - Dinmiyor Hiç Bu Akşam
Best Male Artist in Turkish Folk Music	Nihat Doğan - Felek Sen Ne Feleksin	Burhan Topal - Ağrı Dağın Eteğinde, Kıvırcık Ali - Canımın İçi, Mazlum Çimen - Başımın Belası, Volkan Konak - Gardaş
Best Female Artist in Turkish Folk Music	Zara & Ekrem - Sabahın Seherinde	Gülay - Ahirim Sensin, Hülya Polat - Aha, Selda Bağcan - Unutursun Mihribanım, Şükriye Tutkun - Ağ Elime Kına Yaktılar
Best Group	Hepsi - Kalpsizsin	Gece Yolcuları - Hüzün, Koridor - Senin O Gözlerin Var Ya, Mor ve Ötesi - Şirket, Yüksek Sadakat - Belki Üstümüzden Bir Kuş Geçer
Best Rock Artist	Barış Akarsu - Vurdum En Dibe Kadar	Haluk Levent - Elfida, Murat Kekilli - Ahir Zaman, Pamela - Artık Birşeyler Yapmak Lazım, Teoman - Aşk Kırıntıları
Music Video of the Year	Gitme 'Serdar Ortaç' - Mustafa Uslu	Afili Yalnızlık 'Emre Aydın' - Yon Thomas, Aşkım Baksana Bana 'Nazan Öncel' - Akşit Togay, Bir Işık da Sen Tut - Türk Böbrek Vakfı, Biraz Özgürlük 'Hande Yener' - Luca Tommassini
Best Male Breakout Artist	Murat Boz - Aşkı Bulamam Ben	Bertuğ Cemil - Ben Hiç Sevemem, Emre Aydın - Afili Yalnızlık, Murat Mermer - Mahkûm, Ozan - Zalimsin
Best Female Breakout Artist	Atiye Deniz - Don't Think	Betül Demir - Yaz Geliyor, Eylem - Aman, İrem - Hayalet Sevgilim, Neslihan - Hiç Sevmedim
Best Male Pop Artist	Ferhat Göçer - Cennet	Kenan Doğulu - Çakkıdı, Rober Hatemo - Senden Çok Var, Serdar Ortaç - Dansöz, Yaşar - Hayırdır İnşallah
Best Female Pop Artist	Demet Akalın - Afedersin	Ajda Pekkan - Vitrin, Funda Arar - Benim İçin Üzülme, Hande Yener - Aşkın Ateşi, Nazan Öncel - Aşkım Baksana Bana
Best Male Arabesque-Fantasy Artist	İsmail YK - Git Hadi Git	Ferdi Tayfur - Gizli Sevda, Hakan Altun - Kabul Et, Mahsun Kırmızıgül - Dinle, Müslüm Gürses - Bir Ömür Yetmez
Best Female Arabesque-Fantasy Artist	Ebru Gündeş - Kaçak	Ebru Yaşar - Yeşillenirim, Gülben Ergen - Yalnızlık, Kibariye - Ah İstanbul, Yıldız Tilbe - Su Olsam Sensiz Akmam
Artist of the Year	"Afedersin" (Demet Akalın) - Ersay Üner	"Çakkıdı" 'Kenan Doğulu' - Sezen Aksu, "Dansöz" 'Serdar Ortaç' - Serdar Ortaç, "Gül Senin Tenin" 'Mahsun Kırmızıgül' - Reşit Gözdamla, "Sarı Laleler" 'MFÖ' - Mazhar Alanson
