= Neslihan (singer) =

Turkish musician (born 1983)

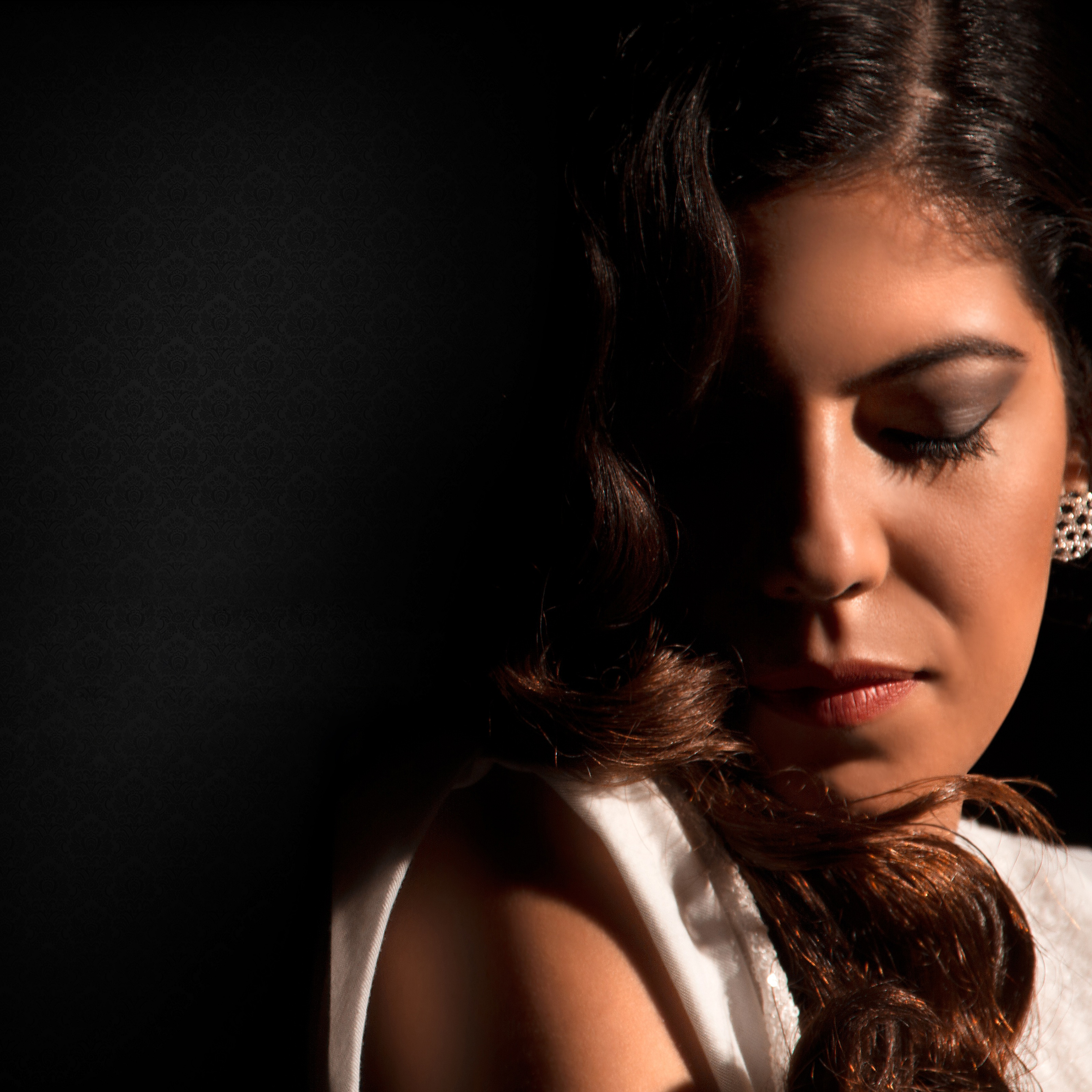

Background information
- Also known as: Neslihan Seda Zafer
- Born: September 26, 1983 (age 42)
- Genres: Pop
- Occupation: Singer-songwriter composer
- Instruments: Guitar, violin
- Years active: 2005–present
- Website: neslihanmusic.com

Neslihan (born September 26, 1983, in Malatya, Turkey) is a Turkish pop music singer, songwriter, and composer. She has been called the Céline Dion of Turkey, and composer Atilla Özdemiroğlu likened her to a modern-day bard. Her songs are known for their ability to express common people's troubles, and Neslihan has stated that her goal is to help humanity through her music.

== Biography ==
Neslihan was born in Malatya, Turkey, in 1983. When she was in second grade, her family moved to Mersin, Turkey, a city whose vibrant musical culture she credits with deepening her interest in music, particularly the guitar.

Neslihan started writing lyrics for her songs when she was in middle school. She composed her first song when she was 14 years old. In high school, she sold her university exam preparation books in order to buy her first guitar. She taught herself to play the guitar by practicing five hours a day.

After living in Mersin for ten years, Neslihan and her family moved to Istanbul, Turkey. She completed her last year of high school there and started studying for a degree in business.

== Career ==
In 2005, Neslihan rose to national prominence in Turkey when her father encouraged her to upload two demo songs, "Hiç Sevmedim" and "Sen," onto VazgectimSenden.com, a website popular with the younger generation in Turkey that had more than 150,000 members at the time. Thousands of people listened to her songs, and Arma Müzik offered her a record deal shortly thereafter. Neslihan made her mark in Turkey by being one of the first artists to rapidly reach success online, a feat made possible by her popularity among university students.

Neslihan's first album, Karalarda Beyazlar ["Whites in Blacks"], was released in April 2006 by Arma Müzik, and it was produced by Ömer Aydın. Neslihan composed the lyrics and music for all ten of the songs in this album, which featured traditional instruments like the ney (end-blown flute), bağlama (special stringed instrument), and Qanun (zither) that shaped the album's "unique pop" style. In December 2006, she gave her first concert at Gazi University in Ankara, Turkey. Even though the venue only allowed for a capacity of 1,000 seats, more than 3,000 people attended.

In March 2007, Neslihan was nominated for Best Female Breakout Artist of 2006 in the 13th Kral TV Video Music Awards.

In 2009, Neslihan released her second album, Pollyanna, for which she once again composed all of the lyrics and music. Pollyanna was released by Su Müzik Productions and the Raks Müzik label, and it was distributed by Maksimum Müzik. It was produced by Serdar Uygun and Aslı Hünel, arranged and managed by Erhan Doğancıoğlu, and recorded by Uluberk Hekimoğlu. Mehmet Ali Nalbant filmed the first music video for this album based on the song, "Vurgun Yedim." While composing the songs for this album, Neslihan worked by candlelight in her music studio because that atmosphere inspired her.

In 2012, Neslihan released her third album, Masal Gibi. The album included a new arrangement of Neslihan's first hit song, "Hiç Sevmedim," alongside ten other new songs. Mehmethan Dişbudak arranged the songs and also contributed to the lyrics in one song. Neslihan's mother, Selma Zafer, contributed to the lyrics of another song. The lyrics and music of all other songs were composed by Neslihan.

Neslihan also hosted music-related radio programs for five years: three years on Dünya Radyo, one year on the Turkish national radio channel TRT FM, and one year on Radyo 7.

Neslihan is known for spontaneously writing and performing songs based on one-word prompts from audience members during live performances. She says she values her listeners' feedback and tries to incorporate their suggestions into later songs and music videos.

Neslihan has been influenced by listening to Barış Manço, Leman Sam, Sezen Aksu, Zeki Müren, and Belkıs Özener, as well as Göksel Baktagir and Müzeyyen Senar.

== Discography ==
- 2006: Karalarda Beyazlar (Whites in Blacks)
- 2009: Pollyanna
- 2012: Masal Gibi (Like a Fairytale)

== Personal life ==
Neslihan responded to criticisms of her lack of revealing her body by stating that she wants people to take an interest in her for her skills as a musician, not for her choice of clothing.
