= Nasıl Delirdim? =

Studio album by Hande Yener
- Released: 15 May 2007
- Studio: T-Ekspres Studio (Istanbul, Turkey)
- Genre: Electronic · electropop
- Length: 75:17
- Label: Erol Köse
- Producer: Hande Yener; Erol Temizel

Hande Yener chronology
Hande Maxi (2006)	Nasıl Delirdim? (2007)	Hipnoz (2008)

Nasıl Delirdim? (How Did I Go Mad?) is the fifth studio album by Turkish singer Hande Yener. It was released on 15 May 2007 by Erol Köse Production. The album contains elements of electronic, pop, house, downtempo, dance and club music, and was the singer's first studio album since the 2006 release of Apayrı. Nine of the album's songs were written and composed by Boaz Aldujeli, making him the songwriter whose name appears the most in the album. Hande Yener served as the album's producer.

Containing 15 songs in total, Nasıl Delirdim? received positive reviews from music critics and was named as one of the best Turkish albums. Recordings were done at the T-Ekspres Studio, and the song "Kibir (Yanmam Lazım)" was chosen as the album's lead single. The second and third music video were released for the songs "Romeo" and "Yalan Olmasın" respectively. All of the music videos were directed by the album's photographer Kemal Doğulu.

After six months of preparations, Nasıl Delirdim? was released with four different covers and sold 72,000 copies. It won the Best Pop Album by a Female Artist award at the İstanbul FM Golden Awards. To promote the album, Yener gave various concerts and performed the album's songs on different programs, including Beyaz Show, MTV Extra and Saba Tümer ile Bu Gece.

== Background and development ==
Hande Yener's change of music style with the release of Apayrı in 2006 was met with mixed reactions, as some critics praised this change while others criticized her for it. In the same year, Yener mentioned that she was seeking new material for her upcoming works and said that she was no longer a singer only with dance songs useful for "putting hands in the air". On 8 September 2006, her second extended play Hande Maxi was released, which included elements of electronic and house music. She later mentioned that electronic music was the most favorite music style during that period.

In April 2007, new details about Hande Yener's new studio album were revealed. It was announced that it would be titled Nasıl Delirdim?, and that its lead single "Kibir (Yanmam Lazım)" was written and composed by Sezen Aksu. After six months of preparations, the album was released on 15 May 2007 by Erol Köse Production with four different covers. The album's cover and photographs were taken by Kemal Doğulu.

It was a lot of work, a lot of effort and all the pieces were created, left in that way, and then we went into the mixing phase, ... and then there was the readings, and we said to ourselves that we would do all of this and focused on the outcome. ... But let me say this first; the lyrics were written first, and then the sound and melody were created on top of them and that's how this concept came into existence. As a result, working in this way gave us more freedom. ... It became an album that I discovered myself within it. From my style to all the details of the arrangements, I was very involved in it. ... That's why I lived through this album, and I'm very happy.

— Hande Yener, talking about the preparations for Nasıl Delirdim?, 2007

With Nasıl Delirdim?, Yener transitioned to the electronic music. The album also contains elements of pop, house, downtempo, dance and club music . It contains 15 songs in total, which, in Yener's opinion, are about the emotions and feelings of people. She wrote seven of the songs together with Boaz Aldujeli. Alper Narman, who had previously worked on the albums Sen Yoluna Ben Yoluma (2002), Aşk Kadın Ruhundan Anlamıyor (2004) and Apayrı, used the name Boaz Aldujeli on this album. Aldujeli wrote nine of the album's songs, making him the songwriter whose name appeared the most in the album. Alongside Aldujeli, Sezen Aksu, Mete Özgencil, Ertuğ Ergin and Olcayto Ahmet Tuğsuz wrote songs for the album. Özgencil, who had written and composed seven of the songs on Apayrı (2006), only wrote and composed "Sen Anla" for Nasıl Delirdim?. Hande Yener also included a new version of the song "Naciye", originally performed by Seyyal Taner, in Nasıl Delirdim?. For the song "Seni Sevi... yorumlar Yok" she used the composition of "Rapture of Love" by Anita Baker.

The album was recorded at T-Ekspres Studio and sold 72,000 copies. It received the Best Pop Album by a Female Artist award the İstanbul FM Golden Awards. At the end of 2009, one of NTV's music judges, Atilla Şen, ranked the album fourth on the list of best albums released over the past decade.

== Critical reception ==
Nasıl Delirdim? received widespread critical acclaim from music critics. In an interview following the release of Nasıl Delirdim?, Hande Yener stated that she was satisfied with the reviews she had received on the album and said: "I've never been so congratulated on any of my albums, never before so many people have come to me from different genres. Even people who have never come to me or praised my style are congratulating me for this album and its music quality. That's why I'm very very happy."

Hürriyet's Onur Baştürk found the album "very good" and published a favorable review on it. Radio personality Michael Kuyucu praised Yener's collaboration with Erol Temizel, and described the re-performance of the song "Naciye" by Yener as the "most beautiful surprise". He also liked the album's cover and stated that in this album he saw a "modern and Western, but a diverge from Turkey['s music]" Hande Yener. Music website Gerçek Pop also praised the album and gave it five stars out of five. It named the album as 2007's "best native album" and "one of the best Turkish albums". In another review in 2010 on the website, it was mentioned that Nasıl Delirdim? and Apayrı (2006) were both a "turning point" in Yener's career. Radio personality Olcay Tanberken described the album as "terrific" and added that Yener was on top of her music career at the moment. He also found the songs "Naciye" and "Seni Sevi... yorumlar Yok" very "entertaining".

== Music videos ==
Nasıl Delirdim?'s first music video was prepared for the album's lead single "Kibir (Yanmam Lazım)". The video was directed by Kemal Doğulu, and Yener's outfits for it were designed by Selim Baklacı and Hakan Yıldırım. The song succeeded in entering Turkey's music charts. In the years after its release, many artists including Murat Boz, Sezen Aksu, Nihat Doğan, Gönül Yazar and Aydilge re-performed the song and included it in their albums.

The second music video was made for the song "Romeo", which was written by Boaz Aldujeli and Hande Yener for Kadir Doğulu. The video was directed by Kemal Doğulu and Kadir Doğulu appeared in the video alongside Yener. Similar to "Kibir (Yanmam Lazım)", "Romeo" successfully entered the music charts inside Turkey. It was also nominated for the Best Song award at the Boğaziçi Music Awards and İmedya Awards. At the music video competition organized by OGAE, a network of 42 Eurovision Song Contest fan clubs, "Romeo" represented Turkey and ranked ninth by garnering 84 points.

The third music video was made for "Yalan Olmasın", a song about a one-way love written by Sezen Aksu and composed by Erol Temizel. The music video was released in January 2008. In the video, directed by Kemal Doğulu, Yener portrayed a character facing a dilemma, who cuts her wrists with a knife in her hand after she realizes that she is not loved back by her beloved.

== Track listing ==
No.	Title	Writer(s)	Composer(s)	Length
1.	"Kibir (Yanmam Lazım)"	Sezen Aksu	Sezen Aksu	4:34
2.	"Ne Yaparsın?"	Hande Yener; Boaz Aldujeli	Erol Temizel	6:14
3.	"Yalan Olmasın"	Sezen Aksu	Erol Temizel	5:01
4.	"Romeo"	Hande Yener; Boaz Aldujeli	Erol Temizel	5:14
5.	"Fırtına"	Hande Yener; Boaz Aldujeli	Erol Temizel	5:10
6.	"Şu An Erken"	Hande Yener; Boaz Aldujeli	Erol Temizel	4:43
7.	"Paranoya"	Ertuğ Ergin	Ertuğ Ergin	5:24
8.	"Nasıl Delirdim?"	Hande Yener; Boaz Aldujeli	Erol Temizel	5:13
9.	"Kurtar Beni"	Boaz Aldujeli	Erol Temizel	5:01
10.	"Kötülük"	Boaz Aldujeli	Erol Temizel	4:19
11.	"Sen Anla"	Mete Özgencil	Mete Özgencil	5:11
12.	"Aşkın Gücü"	Hande Yener; Boaz Aldujeli	Erol Temizel	5:46
13.	"Naciye"	Olcayto Ahmet Tuğsuz	Olcayto Ahmet Tuğsuz	5:02
14.	"Seni Sevi... yorumlar Yok"	Hande Yener; Boaz Aldujeli	Garry Glenn; Dianne Quander	4:02
15.	"Kibir" (Remix)	Sezen Aksu	Sezen Aksu	4:25
Total length:				75:17

== Personnel ==
- Üçüncü Göz Music Film Production Contact Consultancy and Advertising Ltd. – production company
- Erol Köse – producer
- Hande Yener – singer, songwriter, producer
- Sezen Aksu – songwriter, composer
- Boaz Aldujeli – songwriter
- Mete Özgencil – songwriter, composer
- Ertuğ Ergin – songwriter, composer
- Olcayto Ahmet Tuğsuz – songwriter, composer
- Gary Glenn – composer
- Dianne Quander – composer
- T-Ekspres Studio – recording, post production
- Kemal Doğulu – stylist, photographer, cover design
- Kadir Doğulu – management
- Özgür Aras – PR
- CM – printing

Credits adapted from Nasıl Delirdim?'s album booklet.

== Charts ==
Chart (2007)	Peak position
Turkey (Milliyet Local CD Best Sellers)	1

== Sales ==
Country	Sales
Turkey	70,000

== Release history ==
Country	Date	Format	Label
Turkey	15 May 2007	CD, cassette, digital download	Erol Köse Production
Worldwide	15 May 2007	Digital download	MÜ-YAP
