= Hande Maxi =

EP by Hande Yener
- Released: 8 September 2006
- Genre: House · electronic
- Length: 30:17
- Label: Erol Köse
- Producer: Hande Yener

Hande Yener chronology
Apayrı (2006)	Hande Maxi (2006)	Nasıl Delirdim? (2007)

Hande Maxi is the second extended play (EP) by Turkish singer Hande Yener. It was released on 8 September 2006 by Erol Köse Production. It contains elements of house music, and was the singer's first album since the release of Apayrı earlier in 2006, with which she changed her musical style. The album was produced by Hande Yener. Erdem Kınay also served as a producer, and took the task of composing, recording and mixing of a number of the songs. The album contains six songs in total.

Hande Maxi received mixed reviews from music critics. Alongside the songs "Biraz Özgürlük", "Deri Eldiven" and "Heey Çocuk", new versions of "Kelepçe", written by Alper Narman and Fettah Can, and "Kim Bilebilir Aşkı" and "Yola Devam", written by Ertuğ Ergin, were included in the album. The first music video for the EP was made for the new version of "Kim Bilebilir Aşkı", and for this video, scenes from Yener's previous music videos "Acele Etme", "Aşkın Ateşi" and "Kim Bilebilir Aşkı" were mixed together and released as a new video clip. The second music video for the EP was prepared for the song "Biraz Özgürlük". The video was nominated for the Best Music Video of the Year award at the 2007 Kral TV Video Music Awards.

== Background and content ==
With the release of Apayrı in January 2006, Hande Yener changed her musical style, and alongside pop music, she started to use elements of rock, house and R&B in her works. This change was praised by some critics, while others criticized her for it. Yener later stated in an interview that Apayrı was released for the "sake of art", and she insisted that she wanted to make albums that could be "listened to twenty years later" and that she was seeking new material for her upcoming works. In mid 2006, she said that she was no longer a singer only with dance songs useful for "putting hands in the air".

On 8 September 2006, Hande Yener's second EP album and, in her own words, "another sample" of Apayrı, was released by Erol Köse Production under the title Hande Maxi. The EP contains elements of house music and was produced by Yener herself. Alongside the songs "Biraz Özgürlük", "Deri Eldiven" and "Heey Çocuk", new versions of "Kelepçe", written by Alper Narman and Fettah Can, and "Kim Bilebilir Aşkı" and "Yola Devam", written by Ertuğ Ergin, were included in the EP as well. Out of the three new songs, "Biraz Özgürlük" and "Deri Eldiven" were written by Alper Narman. Narman used the nickname Boaz Aldujeli on the latter one. "Heey Çocuk" was written by Hande Yener, while Alpaslan Nas created the poem section of the song. Erdem Kınay, who had worked with Yener on her previous albums, composed the three new songs in the EP, and did the recordings and mixing of the new pieces. The photographs were taken by Kemal Doğulu, who also served as the graphic designer together with Candaş Arın.

== Critical reception ==
Hande Maxi received mixed reviews from music critics. While some praised the work, some harshly criticized it. Radio presenter Michael Kuyucu again criticized Yener for changing her musical style; however, he stated that he had listened to songs from Hande Maxi being played in "different clubs in the European and Turkish societies" and added that Yener's "line change", which had started with "Kelepçe" (Apayrı, 2006), was still being continued. Kuyucu praised Erdem Kınay for his work on the new songs but claimed that none of the new pieces were able to make him excited. He also recommended that Yener turns back to the "style of her first three albums". Hürriyet's Tolga Akyıldız wrote a positive review for the EP. He stated that new songs had taken Yener "one step forward in her work", and described the new versions of "Kelepçe", "Kim Bilebilir Aşkı" and "Yola Devam" as "astonishing". Sabah's Oden Burak also published a positive review and stated that Erdem Kınay's work on Hande Maxi was a standout. Music website Gerçek Pop added that a more suitable title could have been chosen for the EP.

== Music videos ==
Hande Maxi's first music video was made for the song "Kim Bilebilir Aşkı" (New Version). For the video, different scenes from Yener's previous music videos "Acele Etme" (Aşk Kadın Ruhundan Anlamıyor, 2004), "Aşkın Ateşi" (Apayrı, 2006) and "Kim Bilebilir Aşkı" (Apayrı, 2006) were put and mixed together. The three music videos were all directed by Luca Tommassini. The new music video for "Kim Bilebilir Aşkı" (New Version) was released in September 2006.

The second music video was prepared for the song "Biraz Özgürlük", written by Boaz Aldujeli and composed by Erdem Kınay. The video was directed by Luca Tommassini and recorded at a studio in Italy. Four male dancers accompanied Yener in the video, which featured rain effects. It was released in November 2006. The music video was nominated for the Best Music Video of the Year award at the 2007 Kral TV Video Music Awards, but lost it to Serdar Ortaç's "Gitme".

== Track listing ==
No.	Title	Writer(s)	Composer(s)	Length
1.	"Biraz Özgürlük"	Boaz Aldujeli	Erdem Kınay	5:18
2.	"Deri Eldiven"	Alper Narman	Kınay	4:38
3.	"Heey Çocuk"	Hande Yener · Alpaslan Nas	Kınay	4:33
4.	"Kelepçe" (New Version)	Narman · Fettah Can	Bülent Aris	4:32
5.	"Kim Bilebilir Aşkı" (New Version)	Ertuğ Ergin	Ergin	5:45
6.	"Yola Devam" (New Version)	Ergin	Ergin	6:31
Total length:				30:17

== Personnel ==
- Üçüncü Göz Music Film Production Contact Consultancy and Advertising Ltd. (Erol Köse Production) – production company
- Erol Köse – producer
- Hande Yener – singer, songwriter, producer
- Erdem Kınay – composer, producer, recording, mixing
- Boaz Aldujeli – songwriter
- Alpaslan Nas – songwriter
- Alper Narman – songwriter
- Fettah Can – songwriter
- Bülent Aris – composer
- Ertuğ Ergin – songwriter, composer
- Tom Coyne (Stering Sound NYC) – mastering
- Kemal Doğulu – stylist, photographer, graphic design, retouch
- Candaş Arın – graphic design, retouch
- CM Communication Ltd. – printing
- Şermin Ekinci (Pink Production) – PR, management

Credits adapted from Hande Maxi's CD case.

== Release history ==
Country	Date	Format	Label
Turkey	8 September 2006	CD · cassette	Erol Köse Production
Turkey	8 September 2006	Digital download	MÜ-YAP
Worldwide	8 September 2006	Digital download	MÜ-YAP
