= Ayşe Mine =

Turkish singer and actress

- Also known as: Yorgancının Kızı (Quilter's Daughter)
- Born: Ayşe Akyüz; 30 January 1961 (age 65); Istanbul, Turkey
- Genres: Pop; arabesque; Turkish classical
- Occupations: Singer; actress
- Instrument: Oud
- Years active: 1974–present
- Label: Emre

Ayşe Mine (born 30 January 1961) is a Turkish singer and actress.

== Life and career ==
Mine was born Ayşe Akyüz on 30 January 1961 in Istanbul. Her father Celâlettin Akyüz was a quilter in Istanbul, and her mother was Ender Akyüz. Her maternal family were from Istanbul, while her paternal family were from Trabzon. She started her education at Mecidiyeköy 6 Ekim Primary School. She completed her middle and high school education at Mecidiyeköy High School.

Ayşe Mine rose to fame in Turkey at the age of 16 by releasing her first record "Demek Ki Öyle". She started her career by performing pop music but in 1980s she switched to performing arabesque music and in her own words released "broken arabesque" records and cassettes. With her record, Erkek Milleti she won the Gold Long Play Award. In 1994, she had a leading role in the TV series Mutlugiller.

=== Music career ===
Mine started learning music from Radife Erten at the age of 13. After Radife Erten, she took lessons from Muzaffer Birtan, İsmail Akdeniz and Özcan Korkut and benefited from Melahat Pars's experiences as well. She continued her education at Üsküdar Music Society. At the age of 15, she met with record producer Nino Varon. A year later she released her first record. She also performed a cover version of the Greek song "Mathima Solfège" which was rewritten in Turkish. The Turkish lyrics were provided by Ülkü Aker and Onno Tunç served as the arranger for the cover song titled "Sıkı Fıkı", which was composed by Jacques Demarny and Enrico Macias. The song appeared in her first record "Demek Ki Öyle". Mine was one of the first examples who became famous over a night by appearing on television in the late 1970s. She was the second artist to have Nino Varon's patronage after Nilüfer.

After a few months of struggle, Ayşe Mine appeared on TRT and had the opportunity to perform both of the songs from her record on the channel. As her father was a quilter, she was nicknamed "Quilter's Daughter" by the media. This nickname helped her with acquiring further fame. After receiving positive comments and critical acclaim, Mine's 1977 record Demek Ki Öyle / Sıkı Fıkı, released by Nova Plak, managed to top Hey magazine's "Records of the Week" chart.

In 1978, she won an award at the Golden Butterfly Awards ceremony, organized by Hürriyet. In 1979, Mine together with Atilla Atasoy and Dağhan Baydur, she made an attempt to represent Turkey at Eurovision Song Contest. They got to the semi-final in the national contest but were failed to get to the final round. After the Eurovision national selections, Mine released an EP. In the 1980s, with the increasing popularity of arabesque in Turkey, Mine like many other artists stopped performing pop music and instead released arabesque songs. In the following years, she continued her career by releasing arabesque records and cassettes. In 1988, her album Suskunum was among the best-selling records and contained the hit song "Gözlerin Doğuyor Gecelerime". This song was later performed by Zeki Müren and became even more famous. Mine released 1 record through the label Nova Plak, and 2 records through Yankı Plak. For 16 years she worked with Emre Plak and released 11 albums through this company. With her record Erkek Milleti, she won the Gold Long Play award. Mine was the subject of controversy in 2017, after making allegations that the composition for Tarkan's song "Beni Çok Sev" was identical to her 1984 "Ellerim Uğurlar" from the album Yemin Mi Ettin, which was used without her or the composer's position. The song's composer Cengiz Tekin later filed a case at Musical Work Owners' Society of Turkey. In the decision announced by the society, it was announced that the songs bore similarities but they encouraged the parties to solve the issue by reaching an agreement among themselves.

=== Acting career ===
Mine, who had received the "Gold Long Play" award with her record Erkek Milleti, appeared in a movie under the same title in 1986 opposite Murat Soydan. 8 years after the release of Erkek Milleti, Mine made her television debut in 1994 with the TV series Mutlugiller, written by Vecdi Uygun and directed by Demirhan Ersunar. She shared the leading role with Meral Zeren, İbrahim Gündoğan, Diler Saraç, Sadettin Erbil and Canan Hoşgör.

=== Personal life ===
In 1979, Mine married Ergün Günaydın. Together they had two sons, Cenk (born 1980) and Berk (born 1981). Mine and Günaydın later divorced.

== Discography ==
Year	Album	Label	References
1977	Demek Ki Öyle / Sıkı Fıkı	Nova Plak	
1978	Sevdik De Ne Oldu / Mum	Yankı Plak	
1979	Hopşirinini	Yankı Plak	
1982	O Gün Gelmesin	Emre Plak	
1983	Erkek Milleti	Emre Plak	
1984	Yemin Mi Ettin	Emre Plak	
1985	Unutamazsın	Emre Plak	
1986	Güzel	Emre Plak	
1987	Dertli Gelin	Emre Plak	
1988	Suskunum	Emre Plak	
1989	Boşa Beni	Emre Plak	
1990	Ben De Seni...	Emre Plak	
1992	Bir Sen Kaldın	Emre Plak	
1994	Şaka Yaptım	Emre Plak	
1996	Yalancı / Ağla Gönül	Kral Müzik	
2000	Utan	Class Müzik	

== Filmography ==
Year	Title	Notes
1986	Erkek Milleti	
1994	Mutlugiller	TV series
