= Ân (album) =

Studio album by Edis
- Released: 7 March 2018
- Studio: Various: Ceceli Studio (Beykoz); Kaya Music Studios (Beşiktaş); Ozinga Productions (Beşiktaş); Yellow House (Beykoz); Studio Daire (Burhaniye, Üsküdar)
- Genre: Dance-pop
- Length: 42:20
- Label: DMC
- Producer: Edis Görgülü

Edis chronology
| Ân (2018) | Bachi-Bouzouk (2025) |

Singles from Ân
- 1. "Çok Çok" Released: 22 June 2017

Ân (Moment) is the debut studio album by Turkish singer Edis. It was released on 7 March 2018 by DMC. With the release of his first song "Benim Ol" he earned fame and won the appreciation of music critics, yet it took him four years to release his first album. During that period, he changed the production company with whom he had been working, and this further postponed the release of the album. Many of the songs in the album are written by Edis alone, while others were prepared with the help of Alper Narman, Onurr and Yasemin Mori.

Edis's 2017 single "Çok Çok" was included in this album. Its lead single, "Roman", ranked number-one on Turkey's music chart for four consecutive weeks.

== Background and development ==
With the release of "Benim Ol" in December 2014, Edis became a known figure of Turkish pop music, after which he continued his career with the singles "Olmamış mı?" (2015) and "Dudak" (2016). Out of these songs "Benim Ol" and "Dudak" both ranked second on Türkçe Top 20. Throughout this period he published a number of singles and occasionally discussed working on his first studio album. In October 2015, it was reported that Edis had written the majority of songs for his first studio album and that it was about to be released in February 2016. Later on, he mentioned that the album would be released in January 2017, and later he changed the date to October 2017, but the album was not released on either of those dates. He later explained the musical style of the album with these words:

I'm thinking about a style that is going to be superior to all of the works that I have released until now. It's neither going to be like my previous works nor so different. None of the songs are alike. Because this is a result of three years of work. I started this way by asking myself 'What do I do if I make an album?'. 'Dudak', 'Benim Ol' and 'Olmamış mı?' seemed to have the same style but they were in fact very different. So again, each song [in this album] will be different as well.

Meanwhile, in October 2016, he left the recording company PDND Müzik and signed a new contract with Doğan Music Company. PDND Müzik filed a case against the singer, asking for repayment of damages on the grounds that he was transferred to another company before the end of their contract. In April 2017, he announced that the album would consist of ten songs, three of which he wrote and composed together with Alper Narman and Onurr. Out of these songs "Çok Çok" was released as a promotional single in June. Edis later confirmed that he would work with Ozan Çolakoğlu on this album. It was later revealed that Yasemin Mori would also contribute to the album, after she met Edis at an award ceremony organized by Radio Boğaziçi and then she started writing a song for his album. A cover version of Erkin Koray's song "Gün Ola Harman Ola" also appeared on the album, after a one-year discussion with Koray who eventually permitted that the song be re-recorded by Edis.

== Music and lyrics ==
Six of the songs on the album have been written and composed by Edis. Erkin Koray's song "Gün Ola Harman Ola" was also re-composed and included in the album.

As to why the album was named Ân, Edis said: "My album is full of songs that have witnessed every moment of my life. "An" in Persian is beauty, attraction, and the main point of the philosophy of Sufism. In Arabic as in Turkish, it refers to the shortest indivisible time unit. "An" means the indivisible part of time, or eternity."

== Cover ==
Akşam newspaper found the album's cover similar to Shakira's El Dorado (2017).

== Promotion ==
The album was put for digital download on iTunes Store, and was promoted with the description "Edis skilfully weaves through dance rhythms and ballads, and is inspired by his personal experiences, reaching the warmth of a timeless romanticism."

=== Live performances ===
Edis has given a number of concerts in Turkey to promote the album. According to a report by Sözcü 4,000 people attended the album's promotional concert at the Zorlu PSM.

=== Music videos ===
To promote the album, a music video was made for its first single "Roman", directed by Murat Joker and released on the same date as the album. Within its first day of release, it reached one million views on YouTube. The song ranked first on Türkçe Top 20 for four consecutive weeks. "Yalan", "Ân", and "Bana Ne" were the other songs for which separate music videos were released.

== Critical reception ==
Ân received generally positive reviews from critics. The album was found by some to be out of the normal boundaries of other albums and Edis's originality was praised by some critics, yet some compared his style to that of Murat Boz and Tarkan. In Milliyet, Mehmet Tez found the album to be very modern and described the songs's originality as impressive, and praised Edis's efforts to deliver a work that is within the standards of pop music, saying "Edis's album An is an album that aims to capture world pop music in terms of sound and infrastructure." Mayk Şişman from the same newspaper also found the album successful and commented: "We are not facing a surprise; as we expected an album like this from Edis, which is pop, modern and captures the 'moment'." Yavuz Hakan Tok, who writes for Hayat Müzik, mentioned a variety of logical errors in terms of subject integrity, but praised the lyrics in general and said: "There are songs free of innovative content, based on Turkish pop cliches fed by the same writers to us for twenty-three years. ... Different arrangements in this album collide with each other and create a musical integrity in total, making Ân an album that is consistent in its own way and creates its own attitude."

Radioman Michael Kuyucu also commented on a number of albums on his own website, including Ân which he found to be "very mediocre", and said: "There's no hotness in any of these new songs. The same can be said for Edis. Very abusive arrangements on some medium compositions." Hürriyet's writer Serhat Tekin mentioned that the songs show an integrity together and praised the album by saying "It is pop as we call it. Everything is in consistency and thought to the finest detail." Tolga Akyıldız from the same newspaper gave the album 3.5 out of 5, and described Edis's style as "exclusive to himself" and said "He is the candidate to be one of the most ambitious long-distance artists after Tarkan and Murat Boz." Onur Baştürk, also from Hürriyet, compared Edis to Murat Boz and Tarkan, and described the album as "Stylish just like Tarkan's Karma (2001), but also a mixture that discusses today's issues". Suat Kavukluoğlu from NTV.com.tr praised the innovative structure of the album and pointed out that the songs can appeal to large and diverse audiences and mentioned that Edis "has managed to break all the boundaries of pop music". Habertürk's Oden Budak also made similar comments and found the album to be out of the "usual pop album patterns".

== Track listing ==
| No. | Title | Writer(s) | Length |
|---|---|---|---|
| 1. | "Roman" | Edis | 3:48 |
| 2. | "Çok Çok" | Alper Narman · Edis · Onurr | 3:21 |
| 3. | "Yalan" | Alper Narman · Edis · Onurr | 2:56 |
| 4. | "Sevişmemiz Olay" (feat. Yasemin Mori) | Serhat Şensesli · Yasemin Mori | 3:15 |
| 5. | "Sen Özgür Ol" | Edis | 4:26 |
| 6. | "Ân" | Edis | 3:32 |
| 7. | "Bana Ne" | Edis | 3:46 |
| 8. | "Eyvallah" | Edis | 3:15 |
| 9. | "Doldur İçelim" | Alper Narman · Edis · Onurr | 3:10 |
| 10. | "Dur De" | Edis | 3:36 |
| 11. | "Köle" | Edis · Gürsel Çelik | 4:00 |
| 12. | "Gün Ola Harman Ola" | Erkin Koray | 3:15 |
| Total length: | | | 42:20 |

== Personnel ==
- Edis – vocals (all songs); backing vocal (7); songwriter (1, 2, 3, 5, 6, 7); producer
- Alper Narman – songwriter (2, 3)
- Onurr – songwriter (2, 3)
- Ozan Çolakoğlu – arranger (1, 2); mixing (1, 2); mastering (1, 2)
- Caner Güneysu – guitar (1, 3)
- Osman Çetin – recording (1, 2); arranger (3)
- Yasin Dinç – guitar (3)
- Emre Kıral – mastering (3, 4, 5, 6, 7); mixing (6)
- Altay Ekren – mixing (3, 7)
- Berk Kiritiş – recording (3)
- Yenal Yıldız – recording (3)
- Serhat Şensesli – songwriter (4), arranger (4)
- Yasemin Mori – songwriter (4), vocals (4)
- Serhan Yasdıman – guitar (4)
- Utku Ünsal – mixing (4)
- Bilgehan Çoruhlu – recording (4)
- Mustafa Ceceli – arranger (5)
- Birkan Şener – bass (5)
- Erdem Sökmen – guitar (5)
- Koray Püskül – recording (5), mixing (5)
- Onur Nar – violin solo (5)
- Gürsel Çelik – arranger (6)
- Arzu Aslan – vocal arrangement (6), recording (6)
- Derin Bayhan – vocal arrangement (6), recording (6)
- Ozan Bayraşa – arranger (7), electric guitar (7), backing vocals (7)
- Aybüke Albere – backing vocals (7)

Credits adapted from Ân's album booklet.

== Charts ==
| Chart (2018) | Peak position |
|---|---|
| Turkey (D&R Best Sellers) | 1 |

== Release history ==
| Country | Date | Format(s) | Label | Ref. |
|---|---|---|---|---|
| Turkey | 7 March 2018 | CD · digital download | DMC | |
| Worldwide | 8 March 2018 | Digital download | DMC | |
