= Eylem =

- Gender: Feminine
- Language: Turkish

Origin
- Language: Turkish
- Derivation: eylemek
- Meaning: "Action"

Eylem is a feminine Turkish given name derived from the Turkish word 'eylem,' meaning 'action' or 'act'.

== Given name ==
- Eylem Elif Maviş (born 1973), first Turkish woman mountaineer to climb Mount Everest
- Eylem Şenkal (born 1976), Turkish model
- Eylem Tuncaelli (born 1975), Turkish political activist
