= Selam Dengesiz =

Studio album by Ayşe Hatun Önal
- Released: 17 February 2017
- Studios: Ozinga Production; Stüdyo Daire
- Genres: Dance; pop
- Length: 59:31
- Labels: Sony; Epic

Ayşe Hatun Önal chronology
Sustuysam (2008)	Selam Dengesiz (2017)

Selam Dengesiz (Salute Unbalanced) is the second studio album by Turkish singer Ayşe Hatun Önal. It was released on 17 February 2017 by Sony Music Entertainment and Epic Records. Following the release of her first studio album Sustuysam in 2008, Önal went on a hiatus until 2014 when she released the single "Çak Bir Selam" and changed her style from electronic music to pop. Her second studio album features a variety of pop and dance songs.

The name of the album is a mixture of the title of two songs: "Çak Bir Selam" and "Dengesiz". A music video for the lead single "Olay", was released together with the album.

== Background ==
Ayşe Hatun Önal released the electro house Sustuysam in April 2008, together with a music video for one of its songs, after which she rejected Sony Music's offer of making a second music video and did not release any songs until 2014 when she released the single "Çak Bir Selam". She later explained the reason in an interview in 2014: "The album had made me very tired. I did not want to do anything at that moment. I said that the songs would find their way anyway, and just disappeared."

== Lyrics and composition ==
Selam Dengesiz consists of ten songs and six remixed songs. The songs were written by İsra Gülümser, Gülşah Tütüncü, Gülhan, Onur Özdemir and Alper Narman. The other six alternative versions were prepared by İskender Paydaş, Erdem Kınay, Gürsel Çelik, Kaan Gökman, Osman Çetin and Sezer Uysal. The album's first song "Dengesiz" was written by İsra Gülümser. Its lead single "Olay" was written by Gülümsere as well, and for this song Önal worked with producer Mahmut Orhan for the first time. Ayşe Hatun Önal, talked about her collaboration with Gülümsere, saying: "There are two songs written by İsra. For a year I made her write these lyrics. I sat with her for six months and told her my life story, wishing that it would be a source of inspiration". The album's fourth song "Dur Dünyam" was written and composed by Ayşe Hatun Önal. Önal later discussed the song's writing process: "I wrote it 5 years ago. When I listen to a non-verbal music, a timbre catches my attention and I start writing. In general, the story is told to the composers and they make the songs. Those whom we call fabricators have solved the mathematics of this work and do it according to mathematics. I don't want to learn that math specifically. Because then there will be no feelings in my works. ‘Kalbe Ben’ and ‘Dur Dünyam’ were the story of my life and the lyrics came out from my inside at once." The fifth song "Devran" was written by Gülhan and Gürsel Çelik. Önal later said that she "found the song not suitable for herself". The sixth song "Sirenler" was written by Onur Özdemir and released before the album as a promotional single. The seventh song "Cehennem" was also written by Onur Özdemir together with Alper Narman, and it was arranged by İskender Paydaş.

== Track listing ==
No.	Title	Writer(s)	Composer(s)	Length
1.	"Dengesiz"	İsra Gülümser	Amr Mostafa; Ayman Bahgat	4:51
2.	"Beyaz Atletli"	Gülşah Tütüncü	Tütüncü	2:57
3.	"Olay"	Gülümser	Ahmed Salah Hosny	3:29
4.	"Dur Dünyam"	Ayşe Hatun Önal	Önal	3:17
5.	"Devran"	Gülhan	Gürsel Çelik	3:28
6.	"Sirenler"	Onur Özdemir; Alper Narman	Özdemir; Narman	3:26
7.	"Cehennem"	Özdemir; Narman	Özdemir; Narman	3:14
8.	"Güm Güm" (feat. Onurr)	Önal; Özdemir; Narman	Önal; Özdemir; Narman	3:45
9.	"Çak Bir Selam" (Gurcell Style Mix)	Özdemir; Narman	Özdemir; Narman	3:31
10.	"Şeytan Tüyü"	Önal; Özdemir; Narman	Önal; Özdemir; Narman	3:25
11.	"Dengesiz" (İskender Paydaş Version)	Gülümser	Mostafa; Bahgat	4:51
12.	"Beyaz Atletli" (Gülşah Tütüncü & Kaan Gökman Version)	Tütüncü	Tütüncü	3:28
13.	"Olay" (Erdem Kınay Version)	Gülümser	Hosny	3:47
14.	"Dur Dünyam" (Sezer Uysal Remix)	Önal	Önal	5:52
15.	"Sirenler" (Aerro Version)	Özdemir; Narman	Özdemir; Narman	3:40
16.	"Cehennem" (Gürsel Çelik Version)	Özdemir; Narman	Özdemir; Narman	2:57
Total length:				59:31

== Personnel ==
Credits adapted from Selam Dengesiz album booklet.

- Ayşe Hatun Önal - vocals, songwriter (4, 8, 10), composer (4, 8, 10)
- İsra Gülümser - songwriter (1, 3)
- Gülşah Tütüncü - songwriter (2), composer (2), backing vocals (2)
- Ayman Bahgat - composer (1)
- Amr Mostafa - composer (1)
- Ahmed Salah Hosny - composer (3)
- Gülhan - songwriter (5), composer (5)
- Alper Narman - songwriter (6, 7, 8, 9, 10), composer (6, 7, 8, 9, 10)
- Onur Özdemir - songwriter (6, 7, 8, 9, 10), composer (6, 7, 8, 9, 10), vocals (8), backing vocals (8, 9)
- İskender Paydaş - arrangement (1, 7), keyboard and key instruments (1, 7), mixing (1), rhythm programming (1, 7), synthesizer (1, 7)
- Gürsel Çelik - arrangement (2, 5, 8, 9, 10), entry (8), interim entry (9), songwriter (10), composer (10)
- Mahmut Orhan - arrangement (3, 4), recording (3, 4), mixing (3, 4)
- Osman Çetin - arrangement (6)
- Gündem Yaylı Grubu - string instruments (1)
- Mehmet Akatay - percussion (2, 8)
- Ali Yılmaz - stringed authentic instruments (2, 8)
- Eyüp Hamiş - wind instruments (2, 8)
- Gültekin Kaçar - guitar (2, 8, 10), acoustic guitar (9), electric guitar (9)
- Aslıhan Batur - violin (3)
- Aytaç Kart - guitar (4)
- İstanbul Strings - violin (6)
- Caner Güneysu - guitar (6)
- Aycan Teztel - trombone (7)
- Şenova Ülker - trumpet (7)
- Tevfik Kulak Band - brass instruments (9)
- Cüneyt Karayalçın - bass guitar (10)
- Su Soley - backing vocals (1)
- Pınar Çubukçu - backing vocals (5, 9, 10)
- Gaye Biçer - backing vocals (7)
- Serkan Özyurt - recording (1, 7), record editing (1), mixing (1, 7), acoustic guitar (7)
- Özgür Yurtoğlu - mixing (2, 5, 8, 9, 10)
- İlker Bayraktar - recording (5, 8, 10), recording engineer (2, 9)
- Özgün Saatçioğlu - recording (5, 10)
- Emre Kıral - mastering (6)
- Altay Ekren - mixing (6)

== Release history ==
Country	Date	Format	Label	Ref.
Turkey	17 February 2017	Digital download	Sony Music Entertainment; Epic Records	
Worldwide	17 February 2017	Digital download	Sony Music Entertainment; Epic Records	
Turkey	21 February 2017	CD	Sony Music Entertainment; Epic Records	
