= Radife Erten =

- Born: 1924; Beşiktaş, Istanbul, Turkey
- Died: 9 December 1988 (aged 63–64) Istanbul, Turkey
- Genres: Turkish classical
- Occupations: Singer, composer, conductor

Radife Erten (1924 – 9 December 1988) was a Turkish singer, composer and conductor. She worked both as a singer and composer on the Turkish Radio and Television Corporation. Erten was also a music teacher and singers such as Belkıs Özener and Ayşe Mine took music lessons with her.

== Life and career ==
Erten was born in 1924 in Beşiktaş, Istanbul, to Hidayet and Mahmut. She had her primary education in Beşiktaş and completed her middle school education in Nişantaşı. While at the second grade of middle school, she started working at Istanbul Radio and later worked for Ankara Radio. She died on 9 December 1988 in Istanbul.

== Personal life ==
In 1938, she married Celal Erten. The couple had two children, named Sevgi and Tuncer.
