= Sustuysam =

Studio album by Ayşe Hatun Önal
- Released: 17 April 2008
- Genre: Electro house
- Length: 50:37
- Label: Sony BMG; Epic

Ayşe Hatun Önal chronology
Sonunda (2003)	Sustuysam (2008)	Selam Dengesiz (2017)

Sustuysam (If I Kept Quiet) is the first studio album by Turkish singer Ayşe Hatun Önal. It was released on 17 April 2008 by Sony BMG Music Turkey and Epic Records. After setting aside her modelling career, Önal started her music career in 2003 with the release of her first EP Sonunda, after which she spent several years to prepare her first studio album. After preparing her first album, she refused to release it as she was not satisfied with the result and started working on a new project, but following Universal Müzik's bankruptcy she spent a period searching for a new recording label. She also became depressed and went through a financial crisis. For these reasons, the release of her first studio album took more than what she expected.

Sustuysam is an electro house album, consisting of songs written by Ayşe Hatun Önal, some of which were composed by Önal alone while others were composed together Erdem Kınay. In some of her songs she criticized the society, and in some others she made fun of herself. Ege Çubukçu and Fresh B. were featured on the songs "Bomba" and "Aç Kapıyı" respectively. The name of the album Sustuysam, was chosen as a result of Önal's preference to not respond to the criticisms of other people and to remain silent.

The album received generally positive reviews from music critics, and ranked ninth on D&R's list of Most Listened Albums and received the Best Electronic Music Album award at the Radio Boğaziçi Music Awards. Its lead single "Kalbe Ben", ranked ninth on Billboard Türkiye's Türkçe Top 20 and an alien with a head made of disco ball appeared alongside Önal on its music video. There was a disagreement between Sony and Önal about making the second music video. The company wanted to make a second music video, yet Önal refused to cooperate and suddenly disappeared and did not release any new works until 2014, when she returned to the market with the new single "Çak Bir Selam".

== Background and release ==
"When you look at the world, those who do good works have a break of four to five years. I think the release of an album annually led to the blockade of the music market. When I release an album I want all of the songs to be beautiful. If I make 10 songs, the 10 of them should have special features. That is why it took me so long to prepare this album. I didn't like many of the pieces that I had initially prepared. So I wrote and composed again. That took a lot of my time."

–Önal announces the release of her album after five years.

In the early 2000s, Ayşe Hatun Önal set her modelling career aside and in December 2003 she started her music career with the release of her first EP Sonunda and its lead single "Çeksene Elini". After releasing the EP, Önal immediately began preparations for her first studio album, but she did not like many of the initial pieces, so she set them aside and started writing and composing new songs. In August 2005, she appeared on Ege Çubukçu's album 1 Gün and was featured on the song "Hey DJ"; in the same month it was reported that she had begun writing new songs for her upcoming album and she later said that they would fall in the electronic category. In November, Hürriyet's Onur Baştürk announced that he had listened to the new album and said "Ayşe Hatun is coming with a full album this time, just to make everyone dance" and shared the lyrics for the songs "Bomba". In February 2006, Önal announced that the album would be released in April. After this date, although the release of the album was again occasionally discussed, none of the songs were released. By May, the album's preparations had been finished five months prior, but the recording company Universal Müzik announced bankruptcy forcing Önal to look for a new production company, and at the time it was reported that she had meetings with İstanbul Plak. In December, at the end of a tour Önal said that "Hayal would be the name of my album, consisting of eight songs. All of the compositions belong to me. In 2007, everyone will listen to my songs." In January 2007, Sabah announced that the album would be released in March yet the album was not released again and in November Önal stated: "Actually all of the songs are ready. We are doing the final preparations at the studio. If we don't encounter a problem, it will be released in the early months of the next year. Just like my previous albums, the songs are similar to [my previous single] 'Çeksene elini kırıcan mı belimi?' in terms of style." The next month it was announced that she had reached an agreement with Sony BMG to release the album.

In February 2008, she announced that the album would contain ten new songs. In March, its lead single "Kalbe Ben" was broadcast on radios and Ayşe Hatun Önal's first studio album Sustuysam was released by Sony BMG Music Turkey and Epic Records on 17 April 2008. As to why the album was named Sustuysam, she said: "I faced heavy criticism for the late release of this album. They said that I couldn't find a production company, that I was looking for a sponsor, that I couldn't make an album because I had no voice, that I couldn't memorize the lyrics, or that no one would give me their compositions... I've always stayed quiet when facing of all these claims. I finally did a nice job. That is why the album is named Sustuysam. Now it is time to talk about my songs." Önal stated that she had been depressed because of the various injustices that she faced during the development process and that she went through a financial crisis. As a result, she focused on improving herself and overcame her shortcomings to release this album. Sustuysam, ranked ninth on D&R's list of Most Listened Albums. It won the Best Electronic Music Album award at the Radio Boğaziçi Music Awards. To promote the album, Ayşe Hatun Önal performed the songs "Kalbe Ben" and "Bomba" on 25 April 2008 on Beyaz Show, and was accompanied by Ege Çubukçu while singing "Bomba" on the stage.

== Lyrics and composition ==
Sustuysam is an electro house album. The style was described by Önal with these words: "We made the first album progressive-trance. Now more minimal house infrastructures are included, and an instrument from classical music, cello... It's a blend." The album contains ten songs and one remixed song, all of which were written by Ayşe Hatun Önal, while some of them were composed by Önal herself and some together with Erdem Kınay. The lead single "Kalbe Ben", which features violin sounds, discusses the disagreements between brain and heart. The next song is "Yok Yok", which also has a remixed version, followed by "Aç Kapıyı" which featured rap vocals by Fresh B.. With the lyrics "I'm a two-toed big-footed girl" Önal makes fun of her big feet. The fourth song "Bırakma Beni" was composed by Önal and Kınay, followed by "Hayalimdeki", which was praised by Gerçek Pop's editor Fatih Melek who said: "It's not like other pop/electronic songs. It's a beautiful song and its pair cannot be found in this country [Turkey]." The sixth song "Doğru Kanaldan Bağlan" was a dance song. Ege Çubukçu is the rapper featured on "Bomba", and in radioman Michael Kuyucu's opinion the song's lyrics resemble to those of Önal's first single "Çeksene Elini". There are criticisms of the society in the eight and ninth songs "İnat" and "Marslı". The album's only slow song was "Aslında", performed in the form of a tribute by Ayşe Hatun Önal. The lyrics were inspired by a man's words, whom Önal had encountered in a bar.

== Critical reception ==
Sustuysam received generally positive reviews from a number of music critics. Some critics praised the lyrics of the singer by drawing attention to the quality of the album. Billboard Türkiye's Atilla Aydoğdu, discussed Önal's songwriting, about which he said: "She also has a natural innate ability to express herself." and compared the album to Hande Yener's Hipnoz which was released in the same year, and said: "While Yener's album consumes the audience's breath, Önal makes them listen by every breath they have left." Naim Dilmener also made a similar comparison, saying "It's boring, but there's more contemporary electronic sound in it than Hande Yener's album." DJ Suat Ateşdağlı described the album as a "beautiful combination of dance and electronic music". Hürriyet's Savaş Özbey also commented on the album, saying: "It's an album totally made for car driving. There's a song called 'Bırakma Beni'. After the emergence of Anatolian rock, I don't know whether we should call her genre Anatolian electro or not, but this album seizes me by the neck." Hikmet Demirkol from the same newspaper, found the album as a "bold step" in Turkey's music market.

Milliyet's Murat Beşer compared the lyrics to those of "Çeksene Elini" and found the album more likable, saying: "Sustuysam, is a product with good quality, in contrast to 'Çeksene Elini'. Although it may sound funny to some, the songs are generally listenable." Gerçek Pop's editor Fatih Melek found the album successful, giving it 3.5 out of 5, and wrote in his review: "On these days, when local music is becoming more and more intimate with electronics, this is an album that should be listened to". Radioman Michael Kuyucu stated that album was of good quality but could not be commercially successful, commenting: "There is not much to say for songs, because this type of music sounds like free vocals on a loop, and unfortunately most of the songs are soulless and emotionally weak, as in Hande Yener's album. Together with this aspect, we can also call this music genre a bit neoliberal." The music website Her Yerde Müzik also shared a review on the album: "The album is really an outstanding work on the average. However, it's not as if Ayşe Hatun Önal's occasional comments did not spoil its content. Önal is not a good commentator, but I think she closed the gap with her labor and showed a good work."

== Promotion ==
Sustuysam's first and only music video was "Kalbe Ben". It was directed by Murad Küçük, and Danny Miague served as its cinematographer. In the video theater actor Umut Keskin, could be seen as an alien with a head made out of disco ball, and this appearance was meant to represent human's heart. Önal herself portrayed a tall woman exploring the world with the disco ball-headed alien and during the shooting danced in wet clay for 12 hours. On its first week of release, the song ranked 33rd on Billboard Türkiye's Türkçe Top 20 out of 404 songs and in the following weeks rose up to number nine.

Sony BMG insisted on making a second music video for the album, but the idea was rejected by Ayşe Hatun Önal. From 2008 until 2014, she did not release any new songs for six years, and eventually returned to the market with the single "Çak Bir Selam". She later explained the reason in an interview in 2014: "The album had made me very tired. I did not want to do anything at that moment. I said that the songs would find their way anyway, and just disappeared."

== Track listing ==
All of the songs were composed by Ayşe Hatun Önal, unless mentioned otherwise.

No.	Title	Composer(s)	Length
1.	"Kalbe Ben"	Önal · Erdem Kınay	4:32
2.	"Yok Yok"		5:14
3.	"Aç Kapıyı" (with Fresh B.)		3:34
4.	"Bırakma Beni"	Önal · Kınay	6:07
5.	"Hayalimdeki"		4:56
6.	"Doğru Kanaldan Bağlan"	Önal · Kınay	4:23
7.	"Bomba" (with Ege Çubukçu)	Önal · Kınay	3:52
8.	"İnat"		4:01
9.	"Marslı"		3:28
10.	"Aslında"	Önal · Kınay	3:16
11.	"Yok Yok" (Remix)		7:14
Total length:			50:37

== Personnel ==
- Ayşe Hatun Önal – main vocals (all of the songs); songwriter (all of the songs); composer (all of the songs)
- Erdem Kınay – composer (1, 4, 6, 7, 10); arranger (1, 4, 6, 7, 10); recording (1, 4, 6, 7, 10); mixing (1, 4, 6, 7, 10)
- Mehmet Can Erdoğan – arranger (2, 3, 5, 8, 9, 11); bass guitar (3, 8); recording (2, 3, 5, 8, 9, 11); mixing (2, 3, 5, 8, 9, 11)
- Ege Çubukçu – rap vocals (7)
- Fresh B. – rap vocals (3)
- DJ Led – arranger (11)
- Yakup Trana – guitar (2, 3, 8, 9)
- Barış Büyük (Metropolis London) – mastering (all of the songs)
- Beth Trollan – vocals (2, 3, 8)
- Cennet Erdoğan – vocals (2, 3)
- Bahadır Tanrıöver – photographer
- Serdar Beyaz – graphic designer
- Yasemin Kağa – manager

Credits adapted from Sustuysam's album booklet.

== Charts ==
Chart (2008)	Peak position
Turkey (D&R Most Listened Albums)	9

== Release history ==
Country	Date	Format(s)	Label	Ref.
Turkey	17 April 2008	CD; digital download	Sony BMG; Epic	
Worldwide	17 April 2008	Digital download	Sony BMG; Epic	
