= Gece Yolcuları =

- Origin: Istanbul, Turkey
- Genres: Soft rock
- Years active: 1995–present
- Label: TMC
- Members: Üyeler Edis İlhan; Uğur Arslantürkoğlu; Deniz Kaymaraz; Orkun Gezer; Umut Yıldız
- Past members: Bülent Albayrak; Yasin Arslantürkoğlu; Murat Arslantürkoğlu; Volkan Fatih Yılmaz; Semih Keçeci
- Website: http://www.geceyolculari.com.tr/

Gece Yolcuları (literally "Night Riders" or "Night Travelers") is a Turkish soft rock band.

The band began their musical journey as an amateur university student musical act in 1993 and established themselves as a professional act in 1995. Initially, the group decided to compose and share their own music and develop a unique style in the process. In 2004, the band recorded their first album, Gece Yolcuları, produced by EMI, Turkiye. The album was a great success with the first single “Unut Beni” receiving the most airtime. In 2005, the band's hit single "Unut Beni" was chosen as the theme song for Hayat Bilgisi, one of the most popular television series in Turkiye, and the song garnered a lot of popularity as a result.

After the success of their television stint, the band embarked on a tour performing for thousands of fans at universities and several cities in Turkiye. The videos for the group's songs from the first album “Yaban Gülü” and “Ölüm de Var” aired to much positive critical acclaim. Gece Yolcuları also played their part in supporting social causes. In 2005, the quartet participated in the “Hand in Hand for South Asia“, a project to aid survivors of the tsunami disaster in South Asia. The video “Yaban Gülü” was broadcast on MTV Europe and was given a lot of airtime. In late 2005, the band signed up with the record label TMC.

In 2006 the band released their second album, Gece Yolcuları 2, with Cem Özkan who had also produced their first album. The most popular single of the second album was “Neredesin”. With the success of this album, Gece Yolcuları proved that they were innovative with their music. The distinct folk-rock fusion of the second track of the album, “Seninle Bir Dakika” won fan approval with its rendition and harmonization. The third video, “Hüzün”, garnered a lot of attention and stayed on the music charts for several months, indicating that the band were strong and had made a permanent place for themselves in the world of music. The last song on the album, “Gökler Agliyor”, gained fan approval as a successful ballad. The band toured to packed concert venues when promoting Gece Yolcuları 2.

Apart from the album, the quartet also indulged in other musical ventures. They composed the song “BABEYLI” in association with Ramiz for a film by Ö. Faruk Sorak “SINAV” which was a critique of the education system in Turkiye. In addition, “Babeyli” was the first attempt of a 9/8 rap song in Turkey and was performed live as a rock-rap fusion. It was also the first song on a movie soundtrack for the band. The band made a song for Fenerbahçe’s 100th anniversary and composed the song for Trabzonspor for their 40th anniversary. They released their third album on February 14, 2008. The first single of this album is “Deger mi” by Aysel Gürel and Onno Tunç.

On January 1, 2009, the Gece Yolcuları band members decided to part ways and continue their music careers as solo artists. Bülent Albayrak, Yasin Arslantürkoğlu and Murat Arslantürkoğlu exited the band and Edis İlhan and Uğur Arslantürkoğlu decided to continue the band under the same name. They released their first music video with new members, Yıldızlarlayım and kept on performing shows. Gece Yolcuları released their fourth studio album, Neden on 26 February 2013.

== Group Members ==
- Edis İlhan - Vocals, Percussion
- Uğur Arslantürkoğlu - Rhythm guitar, Back vocals
- Volkan F.Yılmaz - Drums
- Semih Keçeci - Bass guitar
- Umut yıldız - Solo guitar

== Albums ==
- Gece Yolcuları (2004)
- Gece Yolcuları 2 (2006)
- Kalbin Kadar Yakın (2008)
- GC2010 (2010)
