= Tan Sağtürk =

Turkish actor, ballet dancer, and choreographer

- Born: Bedri Tan Sağtürk; 14 July 1969 (age 57); İzmir, Turkey
- Citizenship: Turkey
- Education: Hacettepe University Ankara State Conservatory
- Occupations: Choreographer, ballet dancer, actor
- Website: www.tansagturk.org

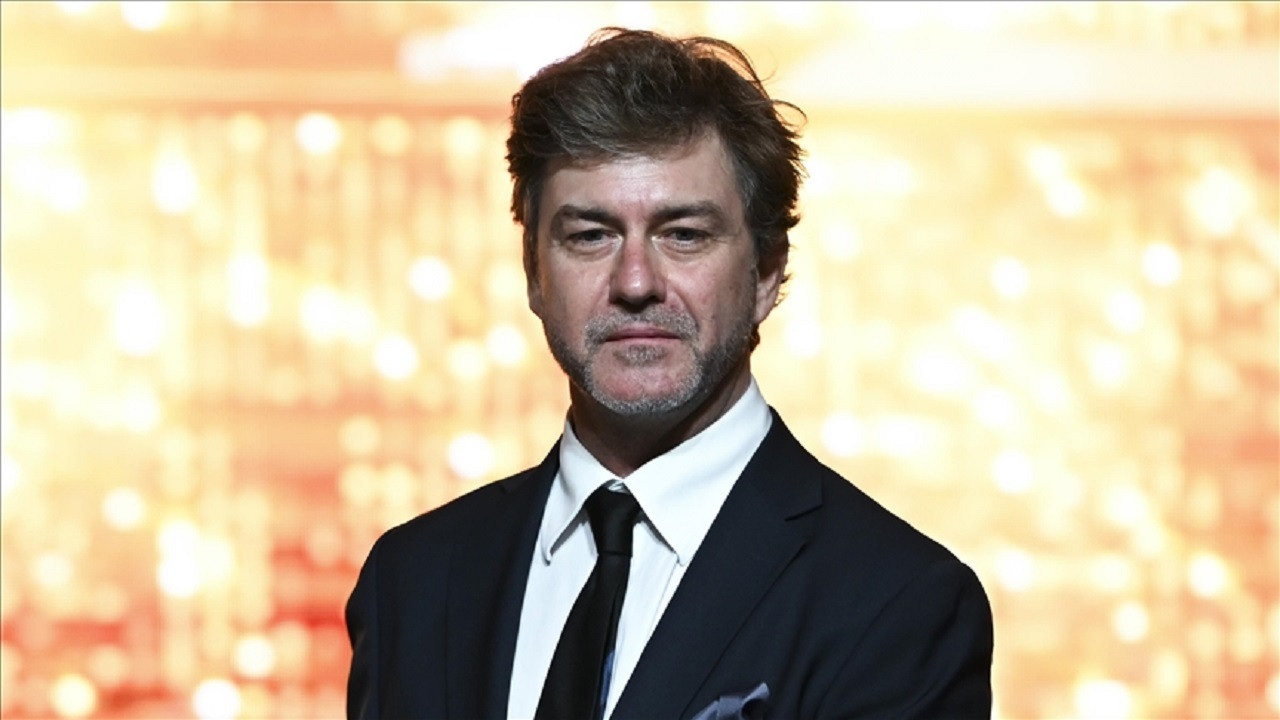
Tan Sağtürk

Tan Sağtürk (pronounced [tan saːtyɾk]) (born 14 July 1969) is a Turkish actor, ballet dancer, choreographer and "Directorate of Turkish State Opera and Ballet".

== Background ==
His maternal family is of Circassian descent. A graduate of Ballet Department of Hacettepe University Ankara State Conservatory, Sağtürk is a soloist dancer of the Jeune Ballet de France, Ballet National de France, and Istanbul National Opera and Ballet. He is also the eponymous founder of ballet and dance schools in Diyarbakır, Mardin, Gaziantep, Kayseri, Istanbul, Ankara, İzmir, and Northern Cyprus. Also, he played in fantasy child series "Bez Bebek" and hit series "İkinci Bahar".
