= Edis (singer) =

Turkish singer and songwriter (born 1990)

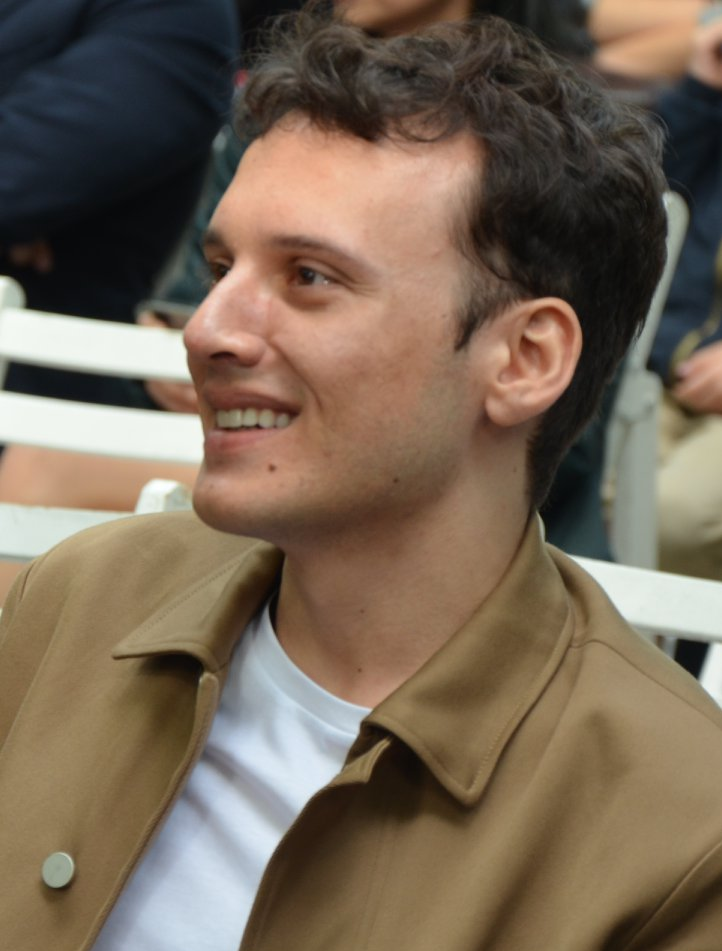
- Edis at the 15th Radio Boğaziçi Music Awards, May 2018
- Born: Edis Görgülü; 28 November 1990 (age 35); London, England
- Education: Galatasaray University; Istanbul University (no degree)
- Occupation: Singer-songwriter
- Musical career
- Genres: Pop; dance
- Years active: 2014–present
- Labels: PDND; DMC; Felix; Warner
- Website: edis.tv

Edis Görgülü (born 28 November 1990) is a Turkish singer and songwriter. He was born in London and raised in İzmir.

After enrolling in Galatasaray University Communication Faculty, he settled in Istanbul. While he wanted to pursue music, he was first successful with acting and had roles in the TV series Dinle Sevgili (2011–12), the films Hayatımın Rolü (2012), an adaptation of Mrs. Doubtfire, and Alya (2023).

After releasing numerous singles, Edis released his first studio album Ân in March 2018. His first single "Benim Ol", which was released in March 2014, was a successful hit and reached number two on Türkçe Top 20. His subsequent singles "Dudak" (2016) and "Çok Çok" (2017) also ranked number two on the charts followed by "Roman", which became a number-one hit. Music critics have praised Edis's style and he has won numerous awards, including a Turkey Music Award.

== Life and career ==
=== 1990–2013: Early years and the start of his career ===
Edis Görgülü was born on 28 November 1990 in London, England. His mother is azeri ( Azerbaijani) and father of turkish origin. Prior to his birth, his parents had moved to London to work and finish their studies. His mother worked in a café while his father got a job in BBC Radio. When Edis was two years old, his parents decided to bring him up in Turkey and moved to İzmir.

Edis took piano lessons at the age of four. After learning piano, he started to sing as well. He subsequently attended İzmir Özel Tevfik Fikret High School. In 2007 he got involved in a project on behalf of his school to promote İzmir as a candidate for Expo 2015. He then became a soloist in İzmir Kent Orchestra. He later told his family that he wanted to become a musician, but they told him that he needed to finish his studies first. After getting enrolled in Galatasaray University Communication Faculty, he settled in Istanbul. Meanwhile, he got a place in Istanbul University State Conservatory and pursued his studies there as well. As he was unable to handle studying at two schools, he left Istanbul University. In Istanbul he tried to contact various people to help him make an album, but he did not succeed. Eventually he started to work with acting agencies.

In 2011–12, he portrayed the character of Barış in Fox TV's series Dinle Sevgili, followed by another role in 2012 as Uygar in Star TV's series Hayatımın Rolü. During his acting years, he went to a club with his friend and while he was singing to a song during a karaoke, he caught the attention of his manager and friends. The manager subsequently offered him to work on a new album. Through his manager Şebnem Özberk who mother of girl group Hepsi, he met Kenan Doğulu for the first time and recorded various demos. He then met Ozan Çolakoğlu and Soner Sarıkabadayı.

=== 2014–present: Singles and Ân ===
After meeting Ozan Çolakoğlu and Soner Sarıkabadayı, Edis signed a contract with PDND Müzik to work on an album. He then listened to numerous songs prepared by Çolakoğlu and Sarıkabadayı. Eventually "Benim Ol" was chosen as Edis's first single. Edis himself wrote the lyrics for "Benim Ol", and the single was released on 1 December 2014 by PDND Müzik. Hepsi member Cemre Kemer appeared in the music video for "Benim Ol". The song was played in Turkey's radio and television and ranked number two on Türkçe Top 20 for three weeks. Edis appeared as a guest on 3 Adam, Güldür Güldür Show and İşte Benim Stilim to promote his new song and later performed at the opening ceremony of the 42nd Golden Butterfly Awards. From 30 March to 6 April 2015 Edis was the most searched name on Google in Turkey. Edis's performances, songs and dance style were praised by the critics. Ali Tufan Koç of Hürriyet called Edis the "sought fresh blood" in music industry.

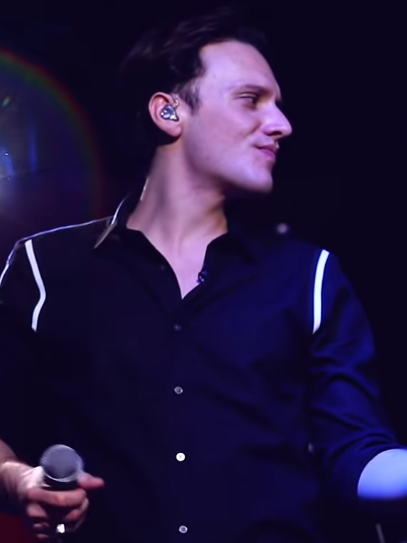
Edis performing in December 2017

From 31 March to 1 April, Edis donated parts of his property to Cancer-Free Life Association. The income from the sale of these items was used to support the treatment of children with cancer. On 2 May he performed at the Bostancı Show Center alongside Soner Sarıkabadayı. On 19 May, he performed at a concert in Sultangazi during which some fans tried to get close to him and the scene almost collapsed. As a result, the concert finished earlier than planned.

On 10 July, his second single "Olmamış mı?" was released. In January 2016, Sezen Aksu's cover song Vay appeared on the soundtrack of the movie Her Şey Aşktan.

In August his new single "Dudak" ranked number two on the music charts in Turkey. In October, he appeared in a commercial for the retailer Defacto. By the end of 2016, he signed a new contract with DMC, and PDND's owner Soner Sarıkabadayı sued him for violating his contract with his company requesting ₺30,000.

Edis's fifth single "Çok Çok" was released in June 2017 by DMC and Felix. The song ranked second on Turkey's music charts and was nominated for the Best Clip and the Song of the Year awards at the 44th Golden Butterfly Awards. In December his concert was streamed online, and Fatma Turgut and Ozan Çolakoğlu appeared on the stage as well.

Edis's first studio album Ân was released in March 2018 by DMC. Its lead single, "Roman", ranked number one on Turkey's music charts for four weeks. Three other music videos from the album were released for the songs "Yalan", "Ân" and "Bana Ne" respectively. Meanwhile, Edis became a spokesman for United Nations Population Fund in Turkey and signed a ₺1 million contract with the brand Yedigün to appear in their commercials. He was one of the artists whose name appeared in Yıldız Tilbe's tribute album Yıldızlı Şarkılar and performed the song "Buz Kırağı". He also released a duet with Emina Jahović in July 2018, titled "Güzelliğine". According to Telifmetre, Edis was the third male artist with the most number of streams on radio and television in 2018. On 20 January 2019, he performed at the halftime show of 2019 Basketbol Süper Ligi All-Star Game at the Sinan Erdem Dome. In early 2019, it was announced that Edis was working on a promotional song for Mastercard Turkey. The song, titled "Paha Biçilemez Bir Şey Başlat", was released in February 2019 together with a music video for which a city bus was used. After signing a contract with Head & Shoulders, Edis wrote and prepared the single "Efsane Sensin" together Onurr. The song, which was produced by Ozan Çolakoğlu, was released in May 2019 with an accompanying music video directed by Gülşen Aybaba. In October 2019, Edis's former management company sued him, demanding ₺3.5 million in damages, stating that Edis had refused to pay them their fair share following the conclusion of his concerts and before terminating his contract with them. On 1 December 2019, Edis marked the fifth year of his career with a concert at the Volkswagen Arena Istanbul. For the event, titled Ân'a Veda, Edis worked with a group of 49 people and performed a new rap song on stage.

In April 2020, his single "Perişanım", which featured elements of pop and urban, was released by Palm & DMC on digital platforms. In August, his duet with Gülşen, titled "Nirvana", was released.

After a long hiatus, he announced his new album's first single "Martılar" in 2021. "Martılar" became one of the most streamed Turkish pop songs on Spotify. A dance challenge based on its official music video was launched on TikTok. Later on, Edis released the second single from his upcoming album, titled "Arıyorum". It garnered 130 million views on YouTube in 5 months. A third single, called "Yalancı", was released in July 2022. In an interview with Hürriyet about his upcoming album, he said: "It's gonna be a revolution I want every single song to be understood. This is why I make sure my fans get used to my sonic evolutions."

== Artistry ==
Edis can play guitar and piano but does not consider himself a professional instrumentalist. His first single "Benim Ol" is said to have classical elements, and Onur Baştürk of Hürriyet considers it similar to the songs of 1990s. Edis wrote his first song at the age of ten "just to attract interest". As he grew older he worked on the lyrics again and considers his attempts to write a song successful. He is a fan of Freddie Mercury, Michael Jackson, Sezen Aksu and Tarkan. During his childhood he mostly listened to Barış Manço, Britney Spears and Justin Timberlake. After listening to Sting's "Desert Rose" he decided to include elements of both Western and Eastern music in his work.

In terms of fashion, Edis sees himself as a bit prejudiced and chooses famous brands more often. He thinks a lot about his style and cares about looking good.

== Discography ==
=== Albums ===
- Ân (2018)
- Bachi-Bouzouk (2025)

=== Non-album Singles ===
- "Benim Ol" (2014)
- "Olmamış mı?" (2015)
- "Dudak" (2016)
- "Paha Biçilemez Bir Şey Başlat" (2019)
- "Efsane Sensin" (2019)
- "Perişanım" (2020)
- "Martılar" (2021)
- "Arıyorum" (2021)
- "Yalancı" (2022)
- "Bana Mı?" (2023)
- "Azar Azar" (2024)
- "Mayhoş" (2024)
- "Küçük Sevgilim" (Saygı1) (2025)
- "Yaktın Beni" (2025)

=== As featured artist ===
- "Güzelliğine" (with Emina Jahović) (2018)
- "Nirvana" (with Gülşen) (2020)
- "Kâinat" (with Anıl Piyancı and Ekin Beril) (2021)
- "Ayyaş" (with Baran Mengüç) (2023)
- "Yaktın Beni" (with Acid Arab) (2026)

=== Covers ===
- "Vay" (from Her Şey Aşktan movie soundtrack) (2016)
- "Buz Kırağı" (from the album Yıldız Tilbe'nin Yıldızlı Şarkıları) (2018)
- "Bana Bir Masal Anlat Baba" (from the album Yeni Türkü Zamansız) (2022)
- "Sor" (with Gülşen) (from the album Serdar Ortaç Şarkıları Vol. 2) (2023)

== Filmography ==
=== Film ===
- Her Şey Aşktan (2016) (Himself)
- İyi Oyun (2018) (Singer)
- Alya (2023) (Mert Benderli)

=== Tv Series ===
- Hayatımın Rolü (2012)
- Menajerimi Ara (2020) (himself/guest)

=== Daily Series ===
- Dinle Sevgili (2011–12) (as Barış)

=== Documentary ===
- Starlight (Netflix original documentary) (2021)

== Awards and nominations ==
Year	Award	Category	Nomination	Result	Ref.
2015	Best of the Digital World Awards	Best Newcomer of the Year	Edis	Won	
2015	Ege University Media Awards	Best Newcomer	Edis	Won	
2015	Golden Homeros Awards	Best Artist of the Year from İzmir	Edis	Won	
2015	Radio Boğaziçi Music Awards	Best Newcomer	Edis	Won	
2015	Vodafone Freezone High School Music Competition	Promising Young Talent	Edis	Won	
2015	Kral Turkey Music Awards	Best Newcomer	Edis	Won	
2015	MGD Golden Objective Awards	Best Newcomer	Edis	Won	
2015	Cypaparazzi KKTC The Bests Awards	Best Male Newcomer	Edis	Won	
2015	Golden Butterfly Awards	Best New Soloist	Edis	Won	
2015	GQ Turkey Men of the Year	Best New Musician of the Year	Edis	Won	
2016	Radio Boğaziçi Music Awards	Best Cover	"Vay"	Won	
2017	Radio Boğaziçi Music Awards	Best Song	"Dudak"	Nominated	
2017	Golden Butterfly Awards	Best Male Pop Musician	Edis	Nominated	
2017	Golden Butterfly Awards	Best Music Video	"Çok Çok"	Nominated	
2017	Golden Butterfly Awards	Song of the Year	"Çok Çok"	Nominated	
2018	Radio Boğaziçi Music Awards	Best Male Pop Music Artist	Edis	Won	
2018	Radio Boğaziçi Music Awards	Best Song	"Çok Çok"	Nominated	
2018	Fizy Music Awards	Best Album	Ân	Won	
2018	Biletix Awards	Top Rated Male Artist	Edis	Won	
2018	Golden Butterfly Awards	Best Male Pop Musician	Edis	Won	
2018	Golden Butterfly Awards	Song of the Year	"Yalan"	Nominated	
2018	Golden Butterfly Awards	Best Music Video	"Yalan"	Nominated	
2018	Golden Butterfly Awards	Best Music Video	"Buz Kırağı"	Nominated	
