= Fettah Can =

Turkish musical artist (born 1975)

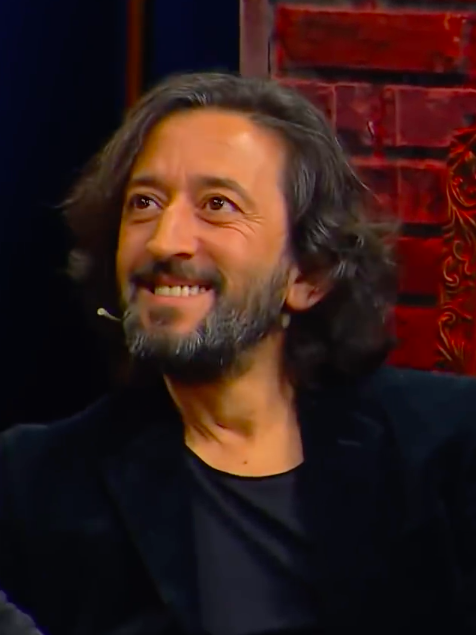
- Can at Tolgshow in 2018
- Born: 12 October 1975 (age 50); Bursa, Turkey
- Occupation: Singer-songwriter
- Spouse: Cansu Kurtçu (m. 2014)
- Children: 2
- Musical career
- Genres: Pop; arabesque
- Instruments: Guitar; oud
- Years active: 1994–present
- Labels: Çınar; Dokuz Sekiz; CF
- Website: www.fettahcan.com.tr

Fettah Can (born 12 October 1975) is a Turkish singer-songwriter.

== Life and career ==
Fettah Can was born on 12 October 1975 in Karacabey, Bursa. His family is of Albanian descent. He spent his childhood in İnegöl. He became interested in music with his father's encouragement. In an interview, Can mentioned how he became a musician: "I would even be ashamed to sing at that young age. But at the request of my father, I started taking singing lessons at the municipal conservatory while working as a shop assistant during the day. On the other hand, I played lute and guitar. I had a lot of desire to write songs. And I wrote lyrics and composed in those years. On the other hand, I finished high school from outside, but I did not go to university. I trained myself with music lessons. I earned my living by singing in bars."

In order to pursue a professional music career, Can moved to Istanbul and first came to the attention of people by writing and composing a song for Emel Müftüoğlu, titled "Ara Ara". Together with his friend, Alper Narman, he wrote 11 songs for Hande Yener's 2002 album Sen Yoluna... Ben Yoluma..., after which she started writing and composing songs for Levent Yüksel, Gülben Ergen, Sibel Can and Murat Boz. He subsequently worked as a backing vocalist on the song "Yalnızlık" from Gülben Ergen's 2006 album. On his decision to become a singer, he said: "I'm a good singer. I also love being on the stage. I've been writing songs for years. I thought it would be fun to sing. Using my vocals in the song "Yalnızlık", which I gave to Gülben Ergen, was effective in this decision. Ergen called me to the stage at the Open Air concert. We sang the song, and people wanted to hear it again. That positive reaction there whipped me. I like my voice and I didn't want to deprive anyone of that sound."

In July 2010, he released his debut studio album Hazine. In the same year, he wrote and composed three songs for Greek singer Giorgos Mazonakis's Ta Isia Anapoda album. The album received a platinum certification in Greece.

== Discography ==
=== Albums ===
Year	Title	Label
21 July 2010	Hazine	Çınar
19 March 2012	Aklımda Kalanlar	Dokuz Sekiz
12 September 2013	Yalanlar Cumhuriyeti	Dokuz Sekiz
28 April 2016	Sen En Çok Aşksın	Dokuz Sekiz

=== Singles ===
Year	Title	Label
February 2011	"Yanan Ateşi Söndürdük" (with Demet Akalın)	Seyhan
May 2011	"Sana Affetmek Yakışır"	Dokuz Sekiz
November 2011	"Boş Bardak"	Dokuz Sekiz
October 2012	"Rüzgâr Ektim Fırtına Biçeceğim"	Dokuz Sekiz
August 2015	"Delirme"	Dokuz Sekiz
November 2015	"Yalan Bu Dünya"	Dokuz Sekiz
January 2018	"Kalakaldın mı?"	CF
August 2018	"Aradığım Aşk"	CF
October 2019	"Bırak Ağlayayım"	CF
May 2021	"Mecnunum Leylamı Gördüm" (with Burcu Arı)	GTR
October 2021	"Siyah İnci"	CF
May 2022	"Nasıl Durumlar"	CF
September 2023	"Zaten Yaz Üç Aydı"	Sony
October 2023	"Yola Devam"	Sony
April 2024	"Kimse Olmadı"	Sony
May 2024	"Dön Gel"	Sony
February 2025	"Sevişmeden Uyumayalım"	Sony
