= Eylem Tuncaelli =

Turkish political activist

Co-President of Green Left Party
- Incumbent
- Assumed office 25 November 2012
- Preceded by: Created office

Personal details
- Born: 1975 (age 50–51) Istanbul, Turkey
- Party: Green Left Party

Eylem Tuncaelli is a Turkish political activist and co-chair and spokesperson for the Green Left Party. She was also a former Chairperson of the Istanbul Branch of the Chamber of Environmental Engineering.

== Biography ==
She was born in 1975 in Istanbul. She graduated from Trakya University in the field of Environmental Engineering in 1999 and in 2000 joined the TMMOB (Union of Chambers of Turkish Engineers and Architects). Between 2004 and 2010, she joined as president of the Istanbul Branch of the Chamber of Environmental Engineering, becoming an active member. In 2012, along with others like Naci Sonmez, she founded the Green Left Party.

=== Prison ===
On February 9, 2018, she and 10 other party members were arrested at 6 am, accused of "generating enmity among the population" and "propaganda for a terrorist organization". The detainees were against Turkish military action in Syria. In the same year, they were released, but their passports were confiscated, preventing them from traveling to other countries.

== Political activism ==
Like the Green Left Party, it is left-liberal and is environmentalist, anti-neoliberal, pacifist, anti-capitalist, and anti-industrialist. She is against water privatization, she is also in favor of identity rights movements (feminism, anti-racism, LGBT rights among others), anti-nuclear movement, labor rights and animal rights.

== See also ==
- Green Left Party
- Eco-socialism
