= Ayşe Hatun Önal =

Turkish model and singer

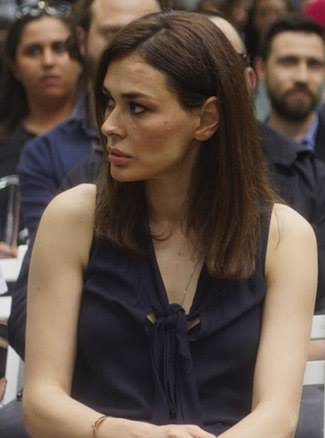
- Önal at the 12th Radio Boğaziçi Music Awards, May 2015
- Born: 29 July 1978 (age 48); Adana, Turkey
- Education: Anadolu University (left)
- Occupations: Model (formerly), singer-songwriter
- Height: 1.81 m (5 ft 11 in)
- Title: Miss Turkey 1999
- Musical career
- Genres: Pop, electronic, dance
- Years active: 2003–present
- Labels: Universal; Sony; Epic; DMC
- Website: www.aysehatunonal.net

Ayşe Hatun Önal (born 29 July 1978) is a Turkish actress, model, singer and beauty pageant titleholder who won Miss Turkey 1999 and represented her country at Miss World 1999 in London.

== Career ==
She graduated from Adana Borsa High School in Adana. Ayşe was a professional model while she was a university student. She studied Public relations at Anadolu University in Eskişehir but left after second grade.

She participated in the Miss Turkey contest in 1999, and won the title. That same year in December, she represented her country at the Miss World 1999.

Since 2004, she successfully played in a number of films, mini television series and commercials. She is interested in music and listens mostly to Sezen Aksu, Sertab Erener, U2, Madonna, Depeche Mode, and Prince.

Önal's voice is alto.

== Discography ==
=== Studio albums ===
Year	Album	Sales and certifications
2008	Sustuysam: Date: 28 March 2008; Format: MC, CD, digital download	
2017	Selam Dengesiz: Date: 17 February 2017; Format: CD, digital download	

=== EPs ===
List of extended plays
Year	Album
2003	Sonunda: Date: 17 December 2003; Format: MC, CD, digital download

=== Singles ===
List of singles
Year	Single
2014	"Çak Bir Selam": Date: 28 March 2014; Format: CD, digital download
2015	"Güm Güm" (featuring Onurr): Date: 28 March 2015; Format: CD, digital download
2016	"Şeytan Tüyü": Date: 21 January 2016; Format: digital download
2016	"Sirenler": Date: 11 November 2016; Format: digital download
2019	"Katakulli": Date: 5 April 2019; Format: digital download
2019	"Efsane": Date: 18 October 2019; Format: digital download
2026	"Su Damlası": Date: 15 May 2026; Format: digital download
2026	"Çıktı Yangınlar": Date: 7 August 2026; Format: digital download

=== As featured artist ===
Year	Song	Album
2005	"Hej DJ" (Ege Çubukçu feat. Ayşe Hatun Önal)	1 Gün
2012	"Sen ve Ben" (Birol Giray feat. Ayşe Hatun Önal)	Sen ve Ben

== Filmography ==
- Bu Film Bitmez (2001)
- Derman Bey (2001) (TV series)
- Mumya Firarda (2002)

== Awards and nominations ==
Year	Award	Category	Result
2006	12. Kral TV Video Music Awards	Best Duet (Hey DJ)	Nominated
2015	12th Radio Boğaziçi Music Awards	Best Female Pop Music Artist	Won
2015	İstanbul Aydın University 11th Communication Awards	Most Popular Singer of the Year	Won
2015	3rd Turkey Music Awards	Best Song (Çak Bir Selam)	Nominated
2015	1st Gossip Time Year-End Awards	Best Duet (Güm Güm feat. Onurr)	Won

Awards
Preceded by Buket Saygı	Miss Turkey; 1999	Succeeded by Yüksel Ak
