= Hilal Cebeci =

Turkish pop singer, presenter, and actress

- Born: 3 July 1976 (age 50); Istanbul, Turkey
- Genre: Pop
- Occupations: Singer, presenter, actress
- Years active: 1994–present

Hilal Cebeci (born 3 July 1976) is a Turkish pop singer, presenter, and actress.

== Life ==
In 1993, Cebeci worked with figures such as Eyyüp Bayram, Sinan Erkoç and Uğur Sönmezsoy and had her first experience in music. During this period, she made music videos for popular songs of the time for many other singers to be broadcast on private television channels and appeared on the television for the first time. She continued her career by establishing a music group and performing at famous hotels and restaurants of Istanbul. After graduating from Hamza Pasha Vocational High School for Girls in 1994, Cebeci started to perform at a number of night clubs for three years.

In September 2019, Cebeci revealed that she has been married since 2013.

== Career ==
With the release of her first album, Köylü Güzeli, in 1999, Cebeci received an award as the "Best female newcomer of the year" at the Kral TV Music Awards. In 2000, Near East University awarded her as the best newcomer female singer. With the success she earned by releasing her first album, she gave a number of public concerts in Turkey between 1999 and 2000. Köylü Güzeli sold 400,000 copies inside Turkey.

In 2001, she had a role in Ersin Pertan's movie Şarkıcı.

In 2003, Cebeci released her third album, Yükselme Zamanı, with which she re-achieved the success of her first album. In the music video for "İpe İpe", Cebeci appeared in outfits similar to those worn by Jennifer Lopez, Shakira and Kylie Minogue in their music videos. The music video turned out to be a success. Her duet song with Doğuş, "Üzülürsün", was turned into a music video and the song became one of the most favorite slow songs of the year. The song "İnşallah (Ayırma Bizi Tanrım)" was also among the popular pieces in the album, and was performed by Hilal Cebeci at various programs. The song after which the album was named, "Yükselme Zamanı" was regularly played on radios. The album sold 130,000 copies in Turkey. To promote the album, Cebeci appeared on various TV programs, contests and talk shows, and was featured on the cover of a number of magazines.

== Discography ==
- 1999: Köylü Güzeli
- 2001: En Güzel Ben Severim
- 2003: Yükselme Zamanı
- 2005: Kim Gitsin
- 2008: Gelmişime Geçmişime
- 2010: Aşk İçin
- 2011: Gamsız Remix / duet with Doğuş
- 2012: Özür Dilersen
- 2014: Senden İyi Yaparım
- 2018: Fokur Fokur
- 2018: Bella Ciao
- 2024: Erkeklerde Yanar

== Filmography ==
- 2000: Tatlı Kaçıklar
- 2000: Olacak O Kadar
- 2001: Şarkıcı
- 2004: Biz Boşanıyoruz
- 2004: Şöhretler Kebapçısı
- 2006: Cennet Mahallesi
- 2008: Aşkım Aşkım
