= Belkıs Özener =

Turkish singer

- Born: Belkıs Özyenginer; 28 March 1940 (age 85); İzmir, Turkey
- Occupation: Singer
- Years active: 1954–2006

Belkıs Özener (born 28 March 1940) is a Turkish singer.

== Life and career ==
Özener was born in the Kestelli neighborhood of İzmir as the third child of road contractor Mehmet from Erzincan and Yugoslavian immigrant Fatma Aras. She has two elder sisters named Belma and Gönül. In 1952, and after her sister Gönül Yazar successfully passed exams to get a job in radio, she moved to Ankara and later to Istanbul with Yazar. Özener soon started taking music lessons from Alâeddin Yavaşça, Zeki Duygulu and Radife Erten and won a song contest as well. At the age of 14, she appeared with Sabite Tur Gülerman on stage as a part of her music personnel. She later got a job by joining Perihan Altındağ's staff at Tepebaşı Casino, where she performed on stage. She initially released records under the name Belkıs Yazar. At the age of 16, she married Rauf Köksalan, with whom she has three children named Benek, Bengü and Barkın.

After marrying, unlike her sister Gönül Yazar who was now a classical music artist, Özener did not continue to appear frequently on stage. In 1967, after receiving an offer from Metin Bükey, she voiced the song that was used for the character played by Türkan Şoray in the movie Sinekli Bakkal. She performed more than 300 songs in different movies, 100 of which were for Şoray, as well as actresses such as Hülya Koçyiğit, Filiz Akın and Fatma Girik. She retired after the Turkish cinema started to change. Her works were collected in 2006 in the album titled Sahibinin Sesinden Yeşilçam Şarkıları.

== Discography ==
=== Records ===
- Unuttum Seni Ben / Açılan Bir Gül Gibi (Columbia - 1955)
- Güller Arasında / Sevdası Zehir (Columbia - 1955)
- Gözlerimin Yaşını Silemiyorum / Ağlarım Gülenim Yok (Grafson - 1963)
- Gönlümde Hazan / Sabah Yıllardan Beri (Efes - 1966)
- Derbederim / Seviyorum Seni Ben (Efes - 1966)
- Seni Yalancı / Öyle Sevdim ki Seni (Efes - 1966)
- Boş Kalan Çerçeve / Anneler Günü (Televizyon - 1969)
- Ne Talihsiz Başım Var / Oy Oy Birtanem (Televizyon - 1969)
- Eski Yuvana Dönsen Olmaz Mı? / Bu Ayrılık Ne Zor Şeymiş (Şençalar - 1970)
- Hayat İlk Sevgiyle Başlar / Bakınca Gözlerine - (Şençalar - 1970)
- Çile / Hayat Sevince Güzel (Saner - 1972)
- Bugünün Yarını Var / Olmaz Olsun Böyle Hayat (Şençalar - 1974)

=== Songs performed in movies ===
- Fosforlu Cevriye
- Sevemedim Kara Gözlüm
- Adını Anmayacağım
- Gözüm Sende
- Nasıl Geçti Habersiz
- Sonbahar Rüzgarları
- Gümüş Gerdanlık
- Civciv Çıkacak Kuş Çıkacak
- Damarımda Kanımsın
- Aşkım Bahardı
- Yağmur
- Dudaklarında Arzu
- Asmam Çardaktan
- İçin İçin Yanıyor
- Sevil Neşelen
- Senin Yüzünden
- Karakolda Ayna Var
- Azize
- Nisan Yağmuru
- Fıstık Gibi
- Buğulu Gözler
- Sen (Ömrüm Benim)
- Tamba Tumba
- Oyun Bitti
- Kulakların Çınlasın
- Ben Seni Unutmak İçin Sevmedim

=== Albums ===
- 2006: Yeşilçam Şarkıları
