= Ertuğ Ergin =

Turkish singer (1970–2012)

Ertuğ Ergin (May 18, 1970 in Adapazarı – December 14, 2012 in Adapazarı) was a Turkish alternative pop-rock singer-songwriter.

== Discography ==
- 2005 : Hayatım (İstanbul Plak)
- 2008 : A1 (Mess Production)
