= Nihat Odabaşı =

Turkish fashion photographer (born 1968)

- Born: 21 May 1968 (age 58); Siverek, Turkey
- Occupations: Fashion photographer; music video director
- Website: www.nihatodabasi.com

Nihat Odabaşı (born 21 May 1968) is a Turkish fashion photographer and music video director.

Odabaşı was born in Siverek. He had his elementary, middle, and high school education in Siverek, Diyarbakır and Istanbul respectively. After his graduation from the Faculty of Business Administration at Istanbul University, he worked as an advertising text writer and art director. He started directing music videos and in 1999 began working as a photographer. Throughout his career, he has directed music videos for various singers and worked as a photographer with numerous artists and brands.

== Early life and education ==
He was born as the youngest of eight siblings on 21 May 1968 in Siverek. His mother is Nadire Odabaşı, and his father was Abdurrahman Odabaşı. Although some time after his birth, he moved to Istanbul with his family, he returned to Siverek, where he stated that he was "living under difficult conditions" because his father was trying to take over the lands that he owned in Şanlıurfa and Siverek. Odabaşı, who was interested in painting in his childhood, received awards in various competitions. After completing his primary and secondary education at Devrim Primary School, he started his high school education at Diyarbakır Anatolian High School in Diyarbakır. Then he continued his high school education at Kadıköy Anatolian High School in Istanbul and graduated in 1986 from there. Although he had stated that he wanted to study cinema-television, he graduated from Istanbul University Faculty of Business Administration "for the sake of his parents". He completed his compulsory military service in 2000 in Malatya.

== Career ==
During his university years, he took acting lessons from Şahika Tekand for three years, then worked as an actor in Tevfik Gelenbe Theater for a year and appeared in a number of commercials. Subsequently, he worked as a writer for six years at an advertising agency. He worked as an art director alongside several photographers. In 1996, he founded Sanart, a company engaged in advertising and music video production. In the same year, he directed his first music video for Soner Arıca's new song "Yalvarma". He had previously written the scenario for some of Arıca's music videos in the past.

In 1999, he started photography. He had his first professional experience by taking photographs of Seren Serengil for Şamdan magazine's cover as they had not been able to find a suitable photographer at the time. Since then, he began to shoot photographs for albums and singles by various artists. On 16 May 2005, at the 2nd Pantene Beauty Awards which took place at Çırağan Palace, he won the "Fashion Photographer of the Year" award. In the same year, he photographed Elizabeth Hurley for the Magnum advertisements. After this work, he took part in various projects with Hurley and pursued an international career. His works with Hurley appeared on The Sunday Times Travel Magazine and Easy Living. In October of the same year, he photographed Linda Evangelsta for the Derimod campaign. On 2 April 2006, he received the "Best Fashion Photographer" award at the 1st Fashion TV Mode Awards which took place at Istanbul Lütfi Kırdar International Convention and Exhibition Center.

He was one of the people who received the Honorary Award at the 1st European Union Quality Awards given by the Consumer Academy on 31 May 2009 at the European Union Quality Summit in Çırağan Palace. The music video for Gülben Ergen's song "Yalnızlık", which was directed by Odabaşı, received the Best Music Video award at the 36th Golden Butterfly Awards on 12 June 2009.

On 13 January 2010, he was selected as one of the Best Photographers of the Year by the Kabataşlılar Association. On 6 March 2012 at the 2nd Pal FM Music Awards, he won the Best Music Video award for the music video he had made for Hadise's song "Superman". On 12 April 2013, at the 1st Turkey Music Awards, his music video for Ziynet Sali's song "Her Şey Güzel Olacak" earned him the Best Music Video award. The same music video was awarded as the Best Music Video on 6 May 2013 at the 3rd Pal FM Music Awards.

He appeared in the music video for Gülben Ergen's song "Dünyaları Versem", which was directed by himself and released in January 2013. On 15 April 2014 at the 3rd Fashion TV Mode Awards and later on 13 May 2015 at the 4th Fashion TV Mode Awards, he received the Best Fashion Photographer of the Year award.

His music video for Metin Arolat's song "Karavan" was nominated for the Best Music Video award at the 42nd Golden Butterfly Awards. On 25 May 2017, he again won the Best Fashion Photographer of the Year award at the 6th Fashion TV Mode Awards. The music videos for Demet Akalın's songs "Ah Ulan Sevda" and "Nazar" and Funda Arar's song "Düşman gibi", all of which were directed by Odabaşı, were nominated for the Best Music Video award at the 44th Golden Butterfly Awards.

== Album photographs taken by Odabaşı ==
- Gülben Ergen - Kör Aşık (1999)
- Nâlân - Nâlân (1999)
- Sibel Can - Daha Yolun Başındayım (1999)
- Deniz Seki - Anlattım (1999)
- Emel Müftüoğlu - Mucize (2000)
- Zerrin Özer - Bir Zerrin Özer Arşivi (2000)
- Nadide Sultan - Aşktan Ölsem (2000)
- Mustafa Sandal - Akışına Bırak (2000)
- Pınar Aylin - Çöl Fırtınası (2000)
- Güher & Süher Pekinel, Jacques Loussier Trio - Take Bach (2000)
- Ayşegül Aldinç - Nefes (2000)
- Soner Arıca - Remix (2000)
- Emel Sayın - Ah Bu Şarkılar (2000)
- Cenk Eren - Gözlerin (2000)
- Ajda Pekkan - Diva (2000)
- Çelik - Unutamam (2000)
- Güllü - Zalim Yar (2000)
- Atilla Taş - Emmilenyum (2000)
- Emel Sayın - Dinle (2000)
- Soner Arıca - Kusursuz Aşk (2001)
- Yıldız Tilbe - Gülüm (2001)
- Zerrin Özer - Dünya Tatlısı (2001)
- Yaşar - Masal (2001)
- İzel - Bebek (2001)
- Ceylan - Can Cana (2001)
- Taner - Aşk Mazi Oldu (2001)
- Birol - Vururum Kendimi (2001)
- Ali Güven - Yeter ki Aşk Olsun (2001)
- İbrahim Tatlıses - Yetmez mi? (2001)
- Hilal Cebeci - En Güzel Ben Severim (2001)
- Deniz Seki - Şeffaf (2002)
- Hande Yener - Sen Yoluna... Ben Yoluma... (2002)
- Nez - Nez (2002)
- Akın - Ateş ve Su (2002)
- Faruk K - Honki Ponki (2002)
- Bülent Ersoy - Canımsın (2002)
- Nâlân - Nâlân (2002)
- Emrah - Artı (2002)
- Umut Akyürek - O Dudaklar Bülbülleşiyor (2002)
- Nil Karaibrahimgil - Nil Dünyası (2002)
- Gülben Ergen - Sade ve Sadece (2003)
- Sibel Tüzün - Kırmızı (2003)
- Rojin - Sî (2003)
- Hande Yener - Aşk Kadın Ruhundan Anlamıyor (2004)
- Murathan Mungan - Söz Vermiş Şarkılar (2004)
- Natalia - Natalia (2004)
- Mirkelam - Kalbimde Parmak İzin Var (2004)
- Zeynep Mansur - Yüzde Yüz Severim (2004)
- Sinem - Yağmur (2004)
- Nil Karaibrahimgil - Bil FM (2004)
- Gülben Ergen - Uçacaksın (2004)
- Demet Sağıroğlu - Korkum Yok (2004)
- Deniz Seki - Aşk Denizi (2005)
- Burcu Güneş - Ben Ateş Ben Su (2006)
- Levent Yüksel - Kadın Şarkıları (2006)
- Nil Karaibrahimgil - Tek Taşımı Kendim Aldım (2006)
- Gülben Ergen - Gülben Ergen (2006)
- Soner Arıca - Remixes / ...Bu Yaz Biz (2006)
- Ajda Pekkan - Cool Kadın (2006)
- Özcan Deniz - Hediye (2007)
- Serdar Ortaç - Nefes (2008)
- Gülben Ergen - Aşk Hiç Bitmez (2008)
- Hadise - Fast Life (2009)
- Gülşen - Önsöz (2009)
- Hadise - "Düm Tek Tek" (2009)
- Nil Karaibrahimgil - Nil Kıyısında (2009)
- Demet Sağıroğlu - "Silkelen!" (2009)
- Murat Boz - Hayat Sana Güzel (2010)
- Ayşegül Aldinç - "O Kız" (2010)
- Tuğba Ekinci - Yanma Demezler (2010)
- Demet Akalın - Aşk (2011)
- Atiye - Budur (2011)
- Ajda Pekkan - Farkın Bu (2011)
- Gülben Ergen - Hayat Bi' Gün (2011)
- Gülşen - Sözde Ayrılık (2011)
- Gülben Ergen & Mustafa Sandal - "Şıkır Şıkır" (2011)
- Deniz Seki - Sözyaşlarım (2011)
- Nil Karaibrahimgil - "Hakkında Her Şeyi Duymak İstiyorum" (2011)
- İrem Derici - "Bensiz Yapamazsın" (2012)
- Ziynet Sali - Sonsuz Ol (2012)
- Ogün Dalka - Renk (2012)
- İzel - Aşk En Büyüktür Her Zaman (2012)
- Seda Sayan - Seda Sayan 2012 (2012)
- Atiye - Soygun Var (2013)
- Gülben Ergen - Gülben Ergen (2013)
- Funda Arar - Hoşgeldin (2015)
- Gülben Ergen & Oğuzhan Koç - "Aşkla Aynı Değil" (2015)
- Gülben Ergen - Kalbimi Koydum (2015)
- Ayşegül Aldinç - Sek'iz (2016)
- Berkay - Arabest (2016)
- Kubat - Al Ömrümü (2016)
- Soner Sarıkabadayı - "Gel de Uyu" (2017)
- Gizem Tuncer - Aşk Uykusu (2017)
- Ziynet Sali & Enbe Orkestrası - "Bir Melekten Hediye" (2017)
- Funda Arar - Aşk Hikayesi (2017)
- Soner Sarıkabadayı - "Tekamül" (2017)
- Simge - Ben Bazen (2018)
- Ayla Çelik - Daha Bi' Aşık (2019)
- Ziynet Sali - "Sana Doyamıyorum" (2022)

== Music videos directed by Odabaşı ==
- Soner Arıca - "Yalvarma" (1996)
- Soner Arıca - "Yüreğime Ektim Seni" (1996)
- Soner Arıca - "Beni Bırakma" (1996)
- Hümeyra - "Beyhude" (1997)
- Hümeyra - "Canım Yanıyor" (1997)
- Soner Arıca - "Sarhoş" (1997)
- Soner Arıca - "Efkarlıyım" (1997)
- Soner Arıca - "Ben Olmadan" (1998)
- Soner Arıca - "Sen Mutlu Ol" (1998)
- Soner Arıca (duet with Okan Bayülgen) - "Ayrılık" (2000)
- Fulden Uras - "Bensiz Olsun" (2000)
- Deniz Seki - "Sana Sığınıyorum" (2000)
- Deniz Seki - "Dile Kolay" (2000)
- İzel - "Hasretim (remix)" (2000)
- İzel - "Kıyamadım" (2001)
- Soner Arıca - "Kusursuz Aşk" (2001)
- Nilüfer - "Beni mi Buldun" (2001)
- Hande Yener - "Küs" (2003)
- Gülben Ergen - "Yalnızlık" (2006)
- Gülben Ergen - "Lay La Lay Lalay" (2006)
- Gülben Ergen - "Aşksın Sen" (2007)
- Gülben Ergen - "Avrupa (2008)
- Gülben Ergen - "Bay Doğru" (2008)
- Gülben Ergen - "Ya Ölümsün Ya Düğün" (2008)
- Gülben Ergen - "Giden Günlerim Oldu" (2009)
- Gülben Ergen - "Çilekli" (2009)
- Gülşen - "Bi' An Gel" (2009)
- Gülben Ergen - "Üzgünüm" (2010)
- Gülben Ergen - "Bir Şans Daha" (2010)
- Gülşen - "Ezberbozan" (2010)
- Gülşen - "Dillere Düşeceğiz Seninle" (2010)
- Ayşegül Aldinç - "O Kız" (2010)
- Ayşegül Aldinç - "Ağla" (2011)
- Hadise - "Superman" (2011)
- Gülşen - "Yeni Biri" (2011)
- Atiye - "Güzelim" (2011)
- Gülşen - "Sözde Ayrılık" (2011)
- Gülben Ergen (duet with Mustafa Sandal) - "Şıkır Şıkır" (2011)
- Ajda Pekkan (duet with Tarkan) - "Yakar Geçerim" (2011)
- Gülben Ergen - "Yarı Çıplak" (2011)
- Ajda Pekkan - "Arada Sırada" (2011)
- Gülben Ergen - "Tesadüf" (2011)
- Funda Arar - "Anmam Adını" (2011)
- Bülent Ersoy - "Bir Ben Bir Allah Biliyor" (2011)
- Gülben Ergen - "Vıdı Vıdı" (2012)
- Murat Boz - "Özledim (Gurcell Club Mix)" (2012)
- Funda Arar - "Geciken Gözyaşı" (2012)
- Bengü - "Haberin Olsun" (2012)
- Ziynet Sali - "Yanabiliriz" (2012)
- Ziynet Sali - "Her Şey Güzel Olacak" (2012)
- Murat Boz - "Geri Dönüş Olsa (Erdem Kınay Mix)" (2012)
- Ebru Gündeş - "Sen Yoluna Ben Yoluma" (2012)
- Kenan Doğulu (duet with Ozan Doğulu) - "Kız Sana Hayran" (2013)
- Gülben Ergen - "Yok Acelem" (2013)
- Gülben Ergen - "Dünyaları Versem" (2013)
- Kenan Doğulu - "Aşka Türlü Şeyler" (2013)
- Oğuz Berkay Fidan (duet with Murat Boz) - "Olmuyor" (2013)
- Murat Boz - "Vazgeçmem" (2013)
- Atiye - "Soygun Var" (2013)
- Gülben Ergen - "Sen" (2013)
- Gülben Ergen - "Sen (Akustik Versiyon)" (2013)
- Ajda Pekkan - "Ara Sıcak (2013)
- Mustafa Sandal - "Tesir Altında" (2013)
- Ziynet Sali - "Deli" (2013)
- Funda Arar (duet with Enbe Orkestrası) - "Pişmanım" (2013)
- Funda Arar - "Hafıza" (2013)
- Gökhan Tepe - "Veda Makamı" (2013)
- Yonca Evcimik - "Burası İstanbul" (2014)
- Hande Yener (duet with Volga Tamöz) - "Biri Var" (2014)
- Simge - "Bip Bip" (2014)
- Ozan Doğulu (duet with Ziynet Sali) - "Naparsan Yap" (2014)
- Sinan Akçıl - "Tabi Tabi" (2014)
- Metin Arolat - "Karavan" (2014)
- Sinan Akçıl - "Hatırlasana" (2014)
- Ziynet Sali - "Bugün Adım Leyla" (2014)
- Funda Arar - "Hayatın Hesabı" (2015)
- Funda Arar - "Yediverenim" (2015)
- Funda Arar - "Bağışla" (2015)
- Nigar Jamal (duet with Berksan) - "Herhalde" (2015)
- Berkay - "Benim Hikayem" (2015)
- Berkay - "Sen Varsın" (2015)
- Meyra - "Karla Karışık" (2015)
- Mustafa Sandal - "Ben Olsaydım" (2015)
- Simge - "Miş Miş" (2015)
- Gülben Ergen (duet with Oğuzhan Koç) - "Aşkla Aynı Değil" (2015)
- Gülben Ergen (duet with Bora Duran) - "Kalbimi Koydum" (2015)
- Cansu - "Kalbim Kefil" (2015)
- Gülben Ergen - "Yıkıl Karşımdan" (2015)
- Ayşegül Aldinç - "Bir Tek Gördüğüm" (2015)
- Ayşegül Aldinç (duet with Gökhan Türkmen) - "Durum Leyla" (2016)
- Gülben Ergen - "Kusura Bakma" (2016)
- Berkay - "Ağla Gözüm" (2016)
- Güliz Ayla - "İlk Öpücük Benden Olsun" (2016)
- Alex - "Gidelim Buralardan" (2016)
- Ahmet Özhan (duet with Gülben Ergen) - "Bana Seni Gerek Seni" (2016)
- Şebnem Keskin - "Öpücük" (2016)
- Bora Duran - "Unut Bakalım" (2016)
- Gülben Ergen (duet with İzel and Ercan Saatçi) - "Özledim" (2016)
- Murat Ceylan - "Yeni Nesil" (2016)
- Özge Doğru - "Velhasıl" (2016)
- Berkay - "Uygun Adım" (2016)
- Gülben Ergen - "Yaklaş Yaklaş" (2016)
- Mustafa Sandal - "Dön Dünya" (2016)
- Röya - "Yolun Açık Olsun" (2016)
- Funda Arar - "Ömrüme Yetiş" (2016)
- Mustafa Sandal - "Hepsi Aşktan" (2016)
- Enbe Orkestrası (duet with Ziynet Sali and Hayyam Nisanov) - "İstanbul" (2016)
- Gülben Ergen - "Panda" (2016)
- Güliz Ayla - "Sevgilim" (2016)
- Berkay - "Yorgun Yıllarım" (2016)
- Demet Akalın - "Ah Ulan Sevda" (2017)
- Enbe Orkestrası (duet with Ziynet Sali) - "Bir Melekten Hediye" (2017)
- Gülben Ergen - "Esasen" (2017)
- Demet Akalın - "Nazar" (2017)
- Funda Arar - "Düşman gibi" (2017)
- Soner Sarıkabadayı - "Tekâmül" (2017)
- Seçkin - "Yokuş" (2017)
- Deniz Seki - "Bal Saklıyor" (2017)
- Yonca Evcimik (duet with İrem Derici and Gökçe) - "Kendine Gel" (2017)
- Mithat Can Özer - "Kara Sevda" (2017)
- Gökhan Tepe - "Sevda Çocukları" (2017)
- Gülben Ergen - "Yansın Bakalım" (2017)
- Soner Sarıkabadayı - "Gel de Uyu" (2017)
- Aynur Aydın (duet with Turaç Berkay) - "Bana Aşk Ver" (2017)
- Fettah Can - "Kalakaldın mı?" (2018)
- Yeliz - "Bekle Yağmur Geliyor" (2018)
- Edis (duet with Emina Jahović) - "Güzelliğine" (2018)
- Cem Yenel - "Aşk Bu Biter mi" (2018)
- Demet Akalın (duet with Emrah Karaduman) - "Ses Kes" (2018)
- Aynur Aydın - "Salla" (2018)
- Nilüfer - "Tik Tak" (2019)
- Ziynet Sali - "Bana da Söyle" (2019)
- Bülent Ersoy - "Ümit Hırsızı" (2019)
- Aynur Aydın - "Düşüne Düşüne" (2019)
- Demet Akalın - "N'apıyorsan Yap" (2019)
- Demet Akalın - "Ağlar O Deli" (2019)
- Gülben Ergen - "Müsaadenle" (2019)
- Ajda Pekkan - "Canın Sağ Olsun" (2019)
- Cem Belevi (duet with Ozan Doğulu) - "Elizabeth" (2019)
- Funda Arar - "Çık Aradan" (2019)
- Ayla Çelik - "Daha Bi' Aşık" (2019)
- Ayla Çelik - "Aşık Oldum Giderken" (2019)
- Gülben Ergen - "Müsaadenle (Akustik)" (2019)
- Ziynet Sali - "Ömrüm" (2020)
- Amal Maher - "Matsebnish" (2020)
- Gökhan Kunt - "Sorsalar Anlatamam" (2020)
- Çağrı - "Dip" (2020)
- Ajda Pekkan - "Bi' Tık (Sunrise Version)" (2021)
- Majid Al Mohandis - "Waareftak" (2022)
- Assala - "Lama Bentgahel" (2023)
- Assala - "El Akhbar El Helwa" (2023)
- Assala - "Mars April" (2023)
- Assala - "Fouq" (2023)
- Assala - "Manga" (2023)
- Assala - "Ragel Mesaly" (2023)
- Ebru Gündeş - "Vakitsiz Geldin" (2023)

== Awards and nominations ==
Award	Date	Category	Nominee	Result	Ref.
2nd Pantene Beauty World Awards	16 May 2005	Fashion Photographer of the Year	Nihat Odabaşı	Won	
1st Fashion TV Mode Awards	2 April 2007	Best Fashion Photographer	Nihat Odabaşı	Won	
1st European Union Quality Awards	31 May 2009	Honorary Award	Nihat Odabaşı	Won	
36th Golden Butterfly Awards	12 June 2009	Best Music Video	"Yalnızlık" (Gülben Ergen song)	Won	
7th Kabataşlılar Association The Bests of the Year	13 January 2010	Photographer of the Year	Nihat Odabaşı	Won	
17th Kral Music Awards	17 May 2011	Best Music Video	"Bi' An Gel" (Gülşen song)	Nominated	
2nd Pal FM Music Awards	6 March 2012	Best Music Video	"Superman" (Hadise song)	Won	
1st Turkey Music Awards	12 April 2013	Best Music Video	"Her Şey Güzel Olacak" (Ziynet Sali song)	Won	
3rd Pal FM Music Awards	6 May 2013	Best Music Video	"Her Şey Güzel Olacak"	Won	
3rd Fashion TV Mode Awards	15 April 2014	Best Fashion Photographer of the Year	Nihat Odabaşı	Won	
4th Fashion TV Mode Awards	13 May 2015	Best Fashion Photographer of the Year	Nihat Odabaşı	Won	
42nd Golden Butterfly Awards	29 November 2015	Best Music Video	"Karavan" (Metin Arolat song)	Nominated	
6th Fashion TV Mode Awards	25 May 2017	Best Fashion Photographer of the Year	Nihat Odabaşı	Won	
44th Golden Butterfly Awards	10 December 2017	Best Music Video	"Ah Ulan Sevda" (Demet Akalın song)	Nominated	
44th Golden Butterfly Awards	10 December 2017	Best Music Video	"Düşman gibi" (Funda Arar song)	Nominated	
44th Golden Butterfly Awards	10 December 2017	Best Music Video	"Nazar" (Demet Akalın song)	Nominated	
7th Fashion TV Mode Awards	2018	Best Fashion Photographer of the Year	Nihat Odabaşı	Won	
Bonne Vie 2018's Stars	18 February 2019	Best Music Video of the Year	"Salla" (Aynur Aydın song)	Won	
