= Kayahan'ın En İyileri No.1 =

Compilation album by various artists
- Released: November 28, 2014
- Recorded: 2014
- Genre: Pop
- Length: 1:20:41
- Language: Turkish
- Label: Doğan Music Company

Kayahan chronology
365 Gün (2011)	Kayahan'ın En İyileri No.1 (2014)

Kayahan'ın En İyileri No.1 (English: The Best of Kayahan Vol. 1) is a tribute album released in late 2014 to the late Turkish singer Kayahan Açar. It was recorded by numerous artists, including Tarkan, Sezen Aksu, Sıla, Nilüfer, Gülşen, Ajda Pekkan, Mustafa Ceceli, and Emre Aydın, among others.

== Background ==
At the time of the album's recording, Açar had been diagnosed with a form of soft-tissue sarcoma, which he had recovered from twice in the past. In response to the recurrence of the disease, as a tribute, the compilation underwent recording and production until its release on November 28, 2014. The album compiled several of his most commercially successful and memorable songs, thus making it a greatest hits album as well, of which it was his only ever recorded out of his previous 18 albums. Açar died on April 3, 2015.

== Track listing ==
All lyrics are written by Kayahan (from previous albums).

Disc 1
No.	Title	Artist	Length
1.	"Yemin Ettim" (Producer: İskender Paydaş, Alişan Göksu)	Tarkan	5:01
2.	"Mor Menekşe" (Producer: İskender Paydaş)	İpek Açar	3:18
3.	"Odalarda Işıksızım" (Producer: Ozan Bayraşa)	Sezen Aksu	4:07
4.	"Canım Sıkılıyor Canım" (Producer: İskender Paydaş)	Sıla	3:21
5.	"Büyük Aşkım" (Producer: Alper Erinç)	Candan Erçetin	3:52
6.	"Emrin Olur" (Producer: Ozan Çolakoğlu)	Gülşen	4:19
7.	"Gönül Sayfam" (Producer: Cem İyibardakçı)	Ajda Pekkan	4:20
8.	"Ve Melankoli" (Producer: Febyo Taşel)	Funda Arar	3:42
9.	"Allahım Neydi Günahım" (Producer: Yıldıray Gürgen)	Mine Koşan	4:15
10.	"Beni Anlamadın Ya" (Producer: Öykü & Berk)	Öykü & Berk	3:13

Disc 2
No.	Title	Artist	Length
1.	"Sarı Saçlarından Sen Suçlusun" (Producer: Mustafa Ceceli)	Mustafa Ceceli	4:17
2.	"Atın Beni Denizlere" (Producer: İskender Paydaş)	Aşkın Nur Yengi	3:28
3.	"Yoksun Sen" (Producer: Gökçer Turan)	Suat Suna	3:37
4.	"Gözlerinin Hapsindeyim" (Producer: Murat Yeter)	Yonca Lodi	3:05
5.	"Nar Tanem" (Producer: İskender Paydaş)	Demet Sağıroğlu	4:34
6.	"Devamı Var" (Producer: Taşkın Sabah)	Gülben Ergen	3:24
7.	"Bir Garip Serçe" (Producer: İskender Paydaş, Alişan Göksu)	Nilüfer	5:35
8.	"Kar Taneleri" (Producer: Samir Şirinov)	Lale Memmedova	4:27
9.	"Her Şeyden Çok (Canımın Yaprakları)" (Producer: Çağatay Şen)	Emre Aydın	4:16
10.	"İlk Değil" (Producer: Alper Atakan)	Mehmet Erdem	4:30

== See also ==
- Kayahan
- Turkish pop music
