= Simge (singer) =

Turkish singer, songwriter and composer (born 1981)

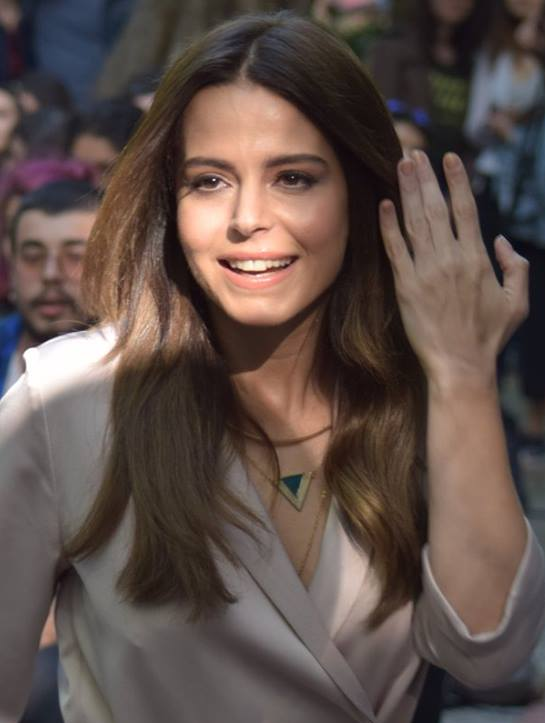
- Simge at the 14th Radio Boğaziçi Music Awards, May 2017
- Born: Simge Sağın; 8 August 1981 (age 44); Şişli, Istanbul, Turkey
- Education: Istanbul Technical University
- Occupations: Singer; songwriter; composer
- Musical career
- Genres: Dance; pop
- Instruments: Vocals; guitar
- Years active: 2011–present
- Labels: Kaya; DMC

Simge Sağın (born 8 August 1981), known mononymously as Simge, is a Turkish singer. From early 2010s, she started to make Turkish pop songs, and with the release of her single "Miş Miş" in 2015 she became one of the most famous artists in Turkey.

Born in Şişli, Istanbul, Simge decided to pursue a career in music and with her father's support enrolled in Istanbul Technical University Turkish Music State Conservatory and took music education. After graduating, she worked as a backing vocalist for many pop singers before releasing her first EP Yeni Çıktı (2011) with the help of Erdem Kınay. Her debut did not earn her the success that she had intended, and her main breakthrough came four years later with the single "Miş Miş", which became a number-one hit on Türkçe Top 20 for four weeks. Following the release of "Yankı" and "Ben Bazen", her name continued to appear among the top three on the music charts, and her song "Öpücem" became a number-one hit in Turkey. Her first studio album, Ben Bazen, was released in 2018, and she received praise from music critics for her musical diversity.

Simge, who has been influenced by Sezen Aksu, has generally released dance-pop songs. Since 2015 her songs have been among the most-streamed works on Turkey's radio and television programs, and in 2018 she became the second female artist with the most number of streams in the country. She has won three Golden Butterfly Awards and two Radio Boğaziçi Music Awards and has received various other nominations.

== Life and career ==
=== 1981–2010: Early life and career beginnings ===
Simge Sağın was born on 8 August 1981 in Şişli, Istanbul, as the second child of her parents. Her mother is of Albanian descent. Her father is also a musician from Amasya. She also has a younger sibling. At the age of 12 she started playing guitar and composing. Simge was not academically successful in high school and, in her own words, she "was disgusting, bad, and a copycat. I used to make copies on my leg and pencils [for cheating]. I was awful in mathematics, physics and chemistry. My literature was good though." She continued her studies in music as a graduate of ITU Turkish Music State Conservatory. She studied Turkish classical music and got a chance to work with many musicians like Alaaddin Yavaşça and Sadahaddin İçli at college.

She gained her first professional experience in Zeynep Dizdar's orchestra. Later, she worked as a backing vocalist for many musicians, including Gülşen, Yaşar, and Serdar Ortaç. She then started to perform on her own at a few places. She made a duet with Kıraç for the TV series Annem, which debuted in 2007. The song "Annem (Mommy)" was among the 20 most listened songs on digital platforms in 2010. She also contributed to the work of many screen credits and soundtracks for TV series, such as Son Bahar (2008). Later, she worked as a backing vocalist on various albums, including Demet Akalın's Zirve (2010) and Gülşen's Ama Bir Farkla (2007). While working for Serdar Ortaç, Simge met Erdem Kınay who was quoted to have said that he would help her produce her own album.

=== 2011–15: Yeni Çıktı and "Miş Miş" ===
After working for a year with Erdem Kınay, Simge's first EP Yeni Çıktı was released in March 2011 by Kaya Müzik. The album's lead single "Ödeme Vakti" was released at the same time with an accompanying music video, followed by another video for the song "Başı Dertte". In order to promote her work, Simge made appearances on programs such as Beyaz Show, Disko Kralı and Hakan Bey. In March 2012, she won the Best Newcomer Artist award at the 2nd Pal FM Awards. Yeni Çıktı did not bring the success that Simge had expected and later in her career she described that failure in a statement saying that it had failed due to "inconvenient publicity". Naim Dilmener of Hürriyet described Simge's debut in her article, stating "Kaya [Production] didn't make any effort to introduce the young singer, and that good-voiced teenage singer couldn't make her voice heard as much as she needed to."

After making her debut Simge continued to perform on her own, and in 2013 she signed seasonal contracts to perform weekly in Eskişehir and İzmir. To continue her work, she signed a new contract with Doğan Music Company and released the single "Bip Bip" in September 2014. "Bip Bip" made more success than the songs she had released three years prior and made her known in the music market, and in Simge's words, returned a "forgotten singer" to life. For the song's music video, directed by Nihat Odabaşı, Simge spent a significant amount of money, leaving her with a ₺30,000 balance on her credit card, which she continued to pay back for a period of time.

Simge continued her career with releasing a cover version of Riff Cohen's song "Dans mon quartier" which was turned into Turkish under the name "Miş Miş" and published in June 2015. The song topped Türkçe Top 20 for four weeks, and made Simge widely known inside the country enabling her to give 200 concerts by the end of the year. According to Telifmetre, the single was the most played song on radio and television in the second half of the year. The single was chosen as the "Best Song" in many award ceremonies including the Golden Objective Awards organized by Magazine Journalists Association, while Simge herself was named the "Best Newcomer Soloist" in a number of award ceremonies including the 42nd Golden Butterfly Awards. Doğan Music Company also gave "Miş Miş" a golden plaque as one of "2015's most listened songs on digital platforms".

=== 2016–present: "Yankı" and Ben Bazen ===
Following the release of "Miş Miş", Simge's career continued with single songs for two years. In January 2016, she released her second single "Yankı", which reached up to number 2 on the official lists and was praised by critics. According to Telifmetre, "Yankı" was the most played song on radio and television from January to September 2016. At the Stars of the Year Awards, organized by Yıldız Technical University, the single was given the Most Liked Song award. The music video for the song became Turkey's ninth most-viewed video on YouTube in Turkey in 2016. In January 2016, she also made a guest appearance on the movie Her Şey Aşktan. In May, she performed at Vodafone Arena during an event organized in honor of Beşiktaş's championship in the Süper Lig. Two months later she released "Kamera", a cover version of the Bollywood song "Badtameez Dil" from the movie Yeh Jawaani Hai Deewani (2013). The music video created for the song was based on the theme of time travel and cost ₺200,000. It was nominated as the "Best Video Clip" at the 43rd Golden Butterfly Awards and 14th Radio Boğaziçi Music Awards, the second of which it won. Although "Kamera" did not win any awards at the 43rd Golden Butterfly Awards, Simge herself was given the Shining Star Award. In the same year, she played in a number of commercials for Deichmann.

In January 2017, she released the single "Prens & Prenses". A few months later, she talked about a person in her interview, mentioning her as "my girl", which resulted in a number of tabloids reporting on her hidden child. Following the break of the news, she was forced to release a statement and said that when using the phrase "the girl" she was actually referring to herself. She filed a lawsuit against Cem Aydınlı who had claimed that Simge had a child whom she was hiding from the public, but agreed to withdraw her complaint in exchange for donating four electric wheelchairs by Aydınlı to the Tohum Autism Foundation. Upon Aydınlı's refusal to accept her offer, the case against him remained open and in August 2019 his imprisonment for up to 4.5 years was requested. At the end of the year, she released the song "Üzülmedin mi?" as the lead single from her first studio album. The song topped the Türkçe Top 20 chart within the first week of its release and won the "Best Song" award at the 15th Radio Boğaziçi Music Awards.

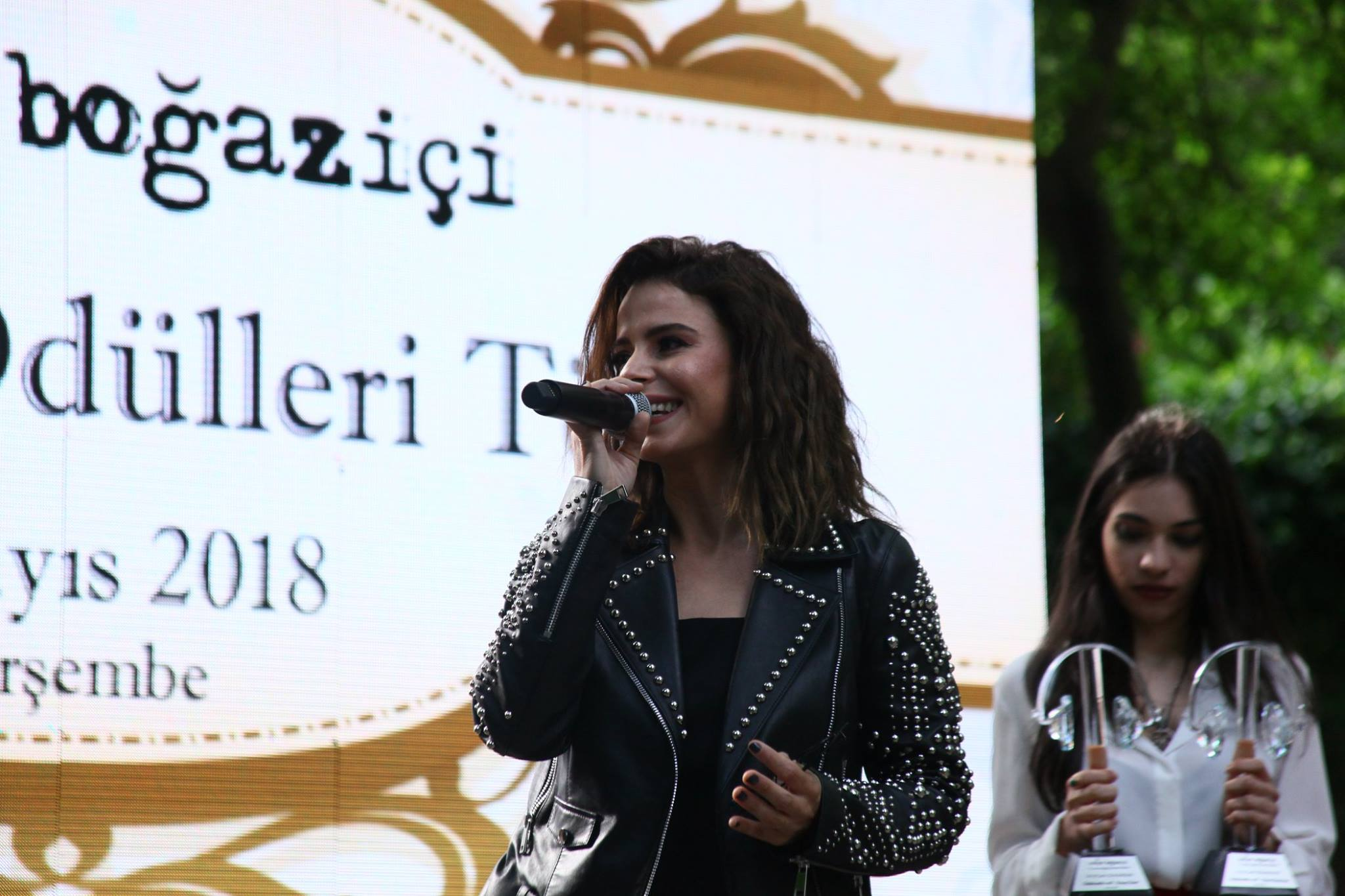
Simge at the 15th Radyo Boğaziçi Music Awards, 2018

In June 2018, her first studio album Ben Bazen was released. The song "Üzülmedin mi?" from the album had been released as a promotional single back in December 2017, and its music video was made as a final sequel to the story shown in the music videos for "Prens & Prenses" and "Yankı". During the preparation process of the album, which lasted over a period of four years, Simge worked with names like Alper Narman, Ersay Üner, Onurr, and Sezen Aksu. Music critics praised the musical diversity in the album and pointed out that this success emerged due to a successful team work. The song that gives the album its name, peaked at number three in Turkey, and a music video was released for it three days after the album's release. Another music video was later released for the song "Öpücem", which eventually ranked first on Turkey's official music chart. According to Telifmetre, Simge was the second female artist with the most number of streams on radio and television in 2018. In the same year, she received a nomination for the Best Pop Music Female Artist award at the Golden Butterfly Awards. Ben Bazen's fourth music video, "Aşkın Olayım" (Onurr), was released in February 2019, followed by the music video for "Yalnız Başına" in October 2019. In 2019, Simge was among the artists who were featured on Ozan Doğulu's album 130 Bpm Kreşendo and performed the song "Ne Zamandır", written and composed by Ersay Üner. A music video for this song was later released in February 2019. Mayk Şişman from Milliyet believed that the song had "the taste of Gülşen's songs. Dolorous, cool, but also modern". In August 2019, Simge's single "As Bayrakları" was released by Doğan Music Company. The song, which was written by Onurr and composed by Onnur and Simge herself, was released together with a music video directed by Seçkin Süngüç. In October 2019, another music video from Ben Bazen was released. The video, made for the song "Yalnız Başına", was recorded in New York City. The album's four final music videos "Pes Etme", "Ram Ta Tam", "İster İnan İster İnanma" and "Gülümseyişinle Uyandım" were released together on 25 February 2020. They all featured monochromatic colors in the background and were directed by Seçkin Süngüç.

== Artistry ==
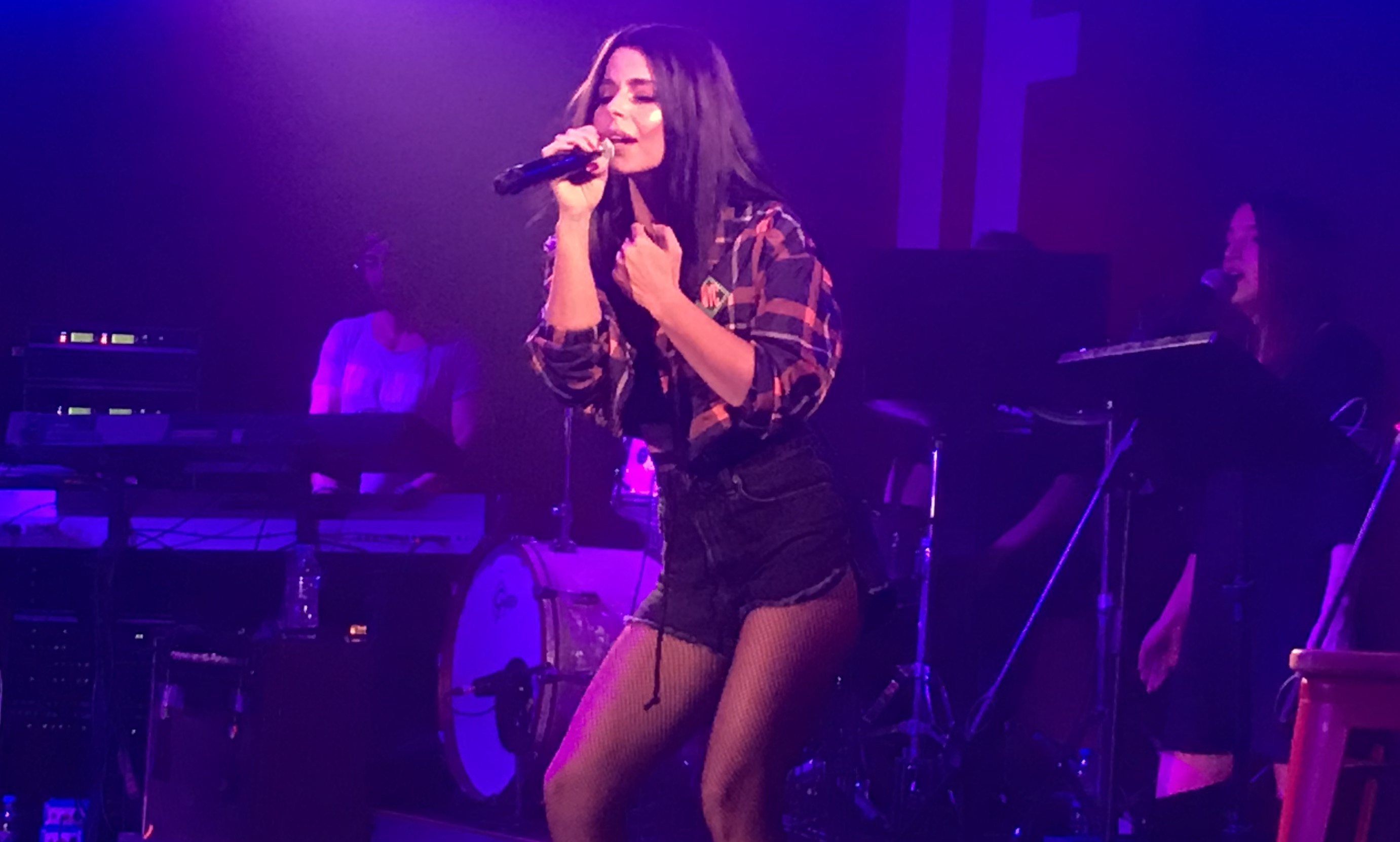
Simge performing in Beşiktaş, October 2018

Simge is a soprano. In an interview in 2011, she discussed her musical style, saying that she tried to use "a little bit of Turkish music mixed with modern elements in [her] songs. So the songs are both Western and Eastern." She named Sezen Aksu as her source of inspiration. Mayk Şişman of Milliyet also commented on the artist's musical style, saying: "The likes of Simge who prefer Western style but also use Eastern elements in their music are automatically loved and embraced, and manage to catch everyone's attention".

== Discography ==
=== Albums ===
==== Studio albums ====
List of albums and sales figures
Album	Album info	Sales
Ben Bazen	Released: 1 June 2018 (TR); Label: DMC; Format: CD · digital download	—N/a
Anlatasım Var	Released: 7 November 2025 (TR); Label: DMC; Format: Digital download	—N/a

=== Extended plays ===
List of albums and sales figures
Album	Album info	Sales
Yeni Çıktı	Released: 4 March 2011 (TR); Label: Kaya; Format: CD · digital download	—N/a

=== Singles ===
List of singles, release date and album name
Single	Year	Peak	Album
Single	Year	TR	Album
"Bip Bip"	2014	—	Non-album single
"Miş Miş"	2015	1	Non-album single
"Yankı"	2016	2	Non-album single
"Kamera"	2016	—	Non-album single
"Prens & Prenses"	2017	—	Non-album single
"Üzülmedin mi?"	2017	4	Ben Bazen
"Ben Bazen"	2018	3	Ben Bazen
"Öpücem"	2018	1	Ben Bazen
"As Bayrakları"	2019	6	Non-album single
"Sevmek Yüzünden"	2021	—	Non-album single
"Kısaca"	2022	—	Non-album single
"Ne Güzel"	2022	—	Non-album single
"Harcandıkça"	2023	—	Non-album single
"Çapkınca"	2023	—	Non-album single
"Ruhum Esirin" (feat. Çağrı Telkıvıran)	2023	—	Non-album single
"Görmem Böylesini" (feat. Sefo)	2023	—	Non-album single
"Yakışıklı" (feat. KÖFN)	2023	—	Non-album single
"Bir Şehri Sevmek" (feat. Mavi Gri, Ozan Bayraşa)	2024	—	Non-album single
"Söyleme"	2024	—	Non-album single
"Önümüz Yaz"	2024	—	Non-album single
"Yankı x İntihar" (feat. Ozan Bayraşa)	2024	—	Non-album single
"Anahtar" (feat. Ozan Bayraşa)	2025	—	Non-album single
"Mucize"	2025	—	Anlatasım Var
"Taksi"	2025	—	Anlatasım Var
"Sevilmeye Doy Diye"	2025	—	Anlatasım Var

==== As featured artist ====
- 2017: "Adem Olan Anlar" (with What Da Funk, from the album WDF1)
- 2018: "Zaten Aşığım" (from the album Yıldız Tilbe'nin Yıldızlı Şarkıları)
- 2019: "Ne Zamandır" (with Ozan Doğulu, from the album 130 BPM Kreşendo)
- 2020: "Bi Gideni Mi Var" (with Sinan Akçıl, from the album Piyanist)
- 2023: "Nasıl Geçti Habersiz" (from the album Emel Şenocak'tan Yıldızlı Pekiyi)

== Filmography ==
Year	Title	Role	Ref
2016	Her Şey Aşktan	Simge	
2021	Üç Kuruş	Simge	
