= Ben Bazen =

Studio album by Simge
- Released: 1 June 2018
- Recorded: 2016–2018
- Studio: Various: Bayrak Records (Istanbul); Deneyevi Sttudio (Maslak, Şişli); Digilog by TC (Beşiktaş); Ev; Kaya Müzik Studios (Beşiktaş); Ozy Records; Serkan Ölçer Home Studio; Studio Lonca (Beykoz); Stüdyo 18 (Fenerbahçe, Kadıköy); YTÜ Voice Recording Studios (Esenler)
- Genre: Dance-pop
- Length: 55:02
- Label: DMC
- Producer: Bayraşa; Simge

Simge chronology
Yeni Çıktı (2011)	Ben Bazen (2018)	Anlatasım Var (2025)

Singles from Ben Bazen
- 1. "Üzülmedin mi?" Released: 29 November 2017

Ben Bazen (I Sometimes...) is the debut studio album by Turkish singer Simge. It was released on 1 June 2018 by Doğan Music Company. After her oriental single "Miş Miş" (2015) topped the music charts in Turkey, Simge continued her career with low-paced songs such as "Yankı" (2016) and started to give hints about the musical style of her first album. During the preparation process of the album, which lasted for four years, she worked with a number of artists, including Ozan Bayraşa, Alper Narman, Ersay Üner, Onurr and Sezen Aksu.

Considered a dance-pop album as a whole, Ben Bazen also contains elements of deep house, R&B, rock, trap and türkü. The lyrics are centered around a woman who tries to tell the story of her love and in some songs she does not give up, while in others she tries to escape from the crisis in her life. Music critics praised the album's musical diversity and pointed out that it had emerged as a result of a successful team work. Photographs of the album were taken by Nihat Odabaşı, and the photograph used on the cover shows Simge holding a guitar with one hand and a microphone with the other.

Five songs from the album were turned into music videos. Months before releasing the album, the song "Üzülmedin mi?" was released as a promotional single in November 2017, and its music video was recorded in Nişantaşı, Şişli. It was centered around a story about unfaithfulness. On its first week of release, the song ranked as number-one on Türkçe Top 20. The music video for "Ben Bazen" was released together with the album. It was recorded in Göcek, Fethiye, and showed Simge dancing alone in a natural environment. The song rose to number-three on Türkçe Top 20. The next music video was made for "Öpücem" in Kilyos, Sarıyer, and the song ranked first on Türkçe Top 20. The fourth music video was released for the second version of the song "Aşkın Olayım", followed by a music video for the song "Yalnız Başına", which was shot in New York.

To promote the album, Simge gave concerts at various places in Turkey and appeared on a number of radio and television programs. Spotify also promoted the album on billboards in numerous places of Istanbul. The album received the Best Album award at the 7th Ayaklı Newspaper TV Stars Award, and the song "Üzülmedin mi?" was given the Best Song award at the 15th Radio Boğaziçi Music Awards. It also earned Simge a nomination for the Best Female Pop Musician at the 45th Golden Butterfly Awards.

== Background and development ==
Simge's debut EP Yeni Çıktı, which was released in 2011, "was knocked against the wall" due to unsuccessful promotion, but in 2015 her main breakthrough came with the single "Miş Miş", which entered the music chart in Turkey. However, in early 2016 she released the song "Yankı" that was different from any of her previous works in terms of style and composition. "Yankı" was later followed by two sequels, "Prens & Prenses" and "Üzülmedin mi?", all centered around a sad love story. The singles took Simge away from the moving and oriental style of "Miş Miş", and she instead started to work on slow-paced songs. Simge explained this change as follows:

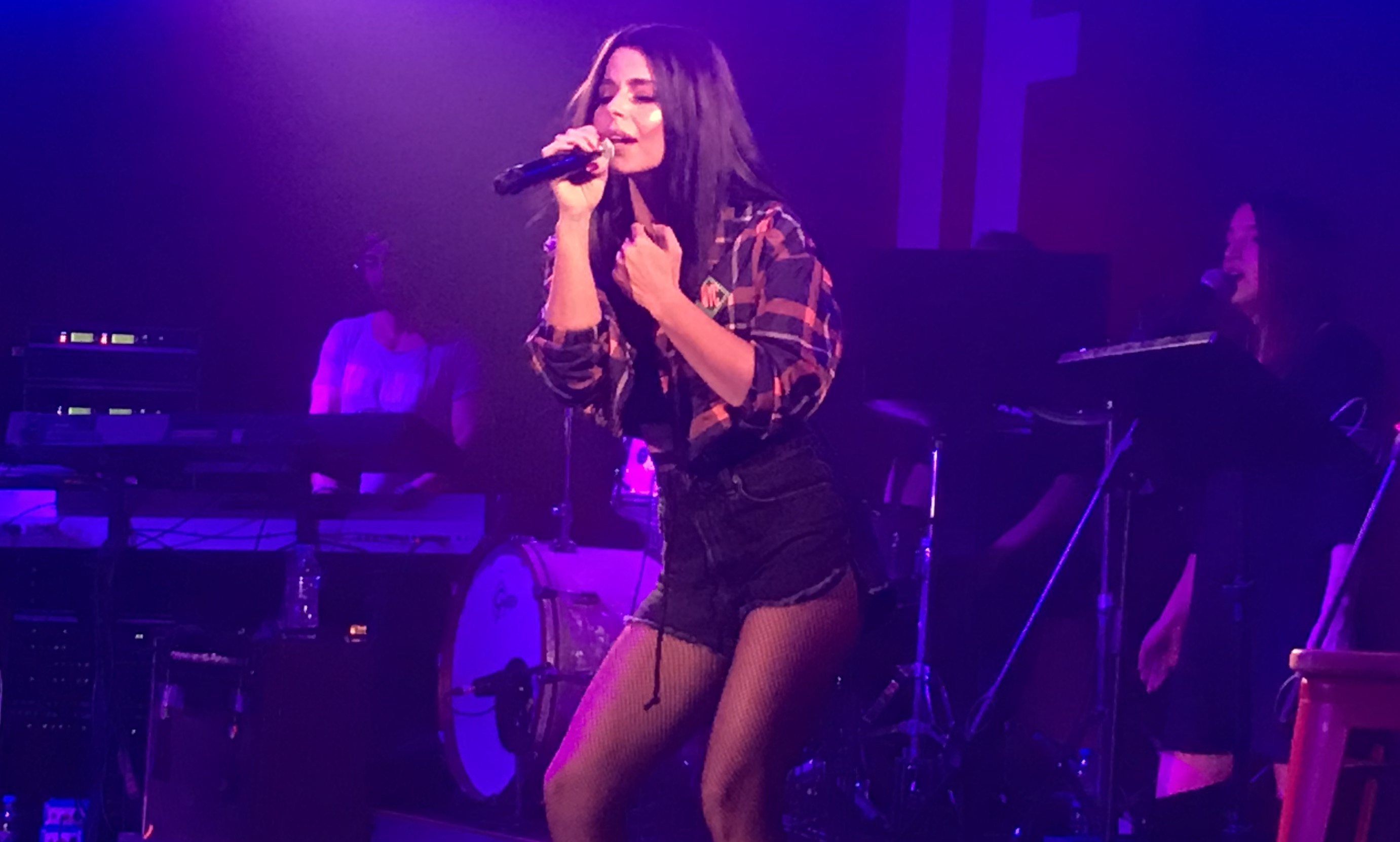
Simge performing at IF Performance Hall in Beşiktaş, Istanbul, October 2018

After I released ‘Miş Miş’, I started to fear that everyone was waiting for me to produce songs only with this style. I even had nights when I couldn't sleep. But I decided to take a risk. 'Yankı' is something in the middle: neither fast nor slow, and of intermediate speed. You can see that the playful Simge was replaced by a cold woman, who was telling a story.... 'Miş Miş' demonstrates an oriental woman. Actually I didn't want to be that oriental, but it somehow worked out. For me it was a good PR song. I'll continue my way with songs like 'Yankı' but people will see playful Simge regularly as well.

In January 2017, after the release of "Prens & Prenses", Simge announced in an interview that together with her boyfriend, musician Ozan Bayraşa, she had been working on her first studio album for two months. In August, at a concert in Manavgat, Antalya, she discussed the album again and said: "An exceptional album is on its way, so I think you should prepare your handkerchiefs. Large amounts of tear will flow. But we're gonna play as well. There are going to be songs like 'Miş Miş' and songs like 'Yankı' in it." In late November, she released the song "Üzülmedin mi?" as a promotional single for her album. For "Üzülmedin mi?" and the other songs on the album, Simge worked with Ozan Bayraşa, Ersay Üner and Sezen Aksu, with whom she had previously worked on her other projects. Although the album's preparations lasted two years, Simge had started collecting songs almost four years before its eventual release. Inspired by the works released in the 1990s, Simge decided to include songs in the album that were able to affect her emotionally while listening to them for the first time. She recorded the demos of the songs first, and chose the ones that were suitable for her voice for the album. She eventually named the album after the song "Ben Bazen", believing that this title would reflect the entire content of her work.

== Recording ==
Ben Bazen's studio recordings began in late 2016 and continued until the second quarter of 2018. In March 2018, she announced that the last two songs had not been recorded yet, and in the following month she stated that the recording was over and the album had been completed and the whole album was ready. The recording of the songs took place at various studios in Istanbul, including Bayrak Records, Deneyevi Studio, Digilog by TC, Kaya Müzik Studios, Ozy Records, Serkan Ölçer Home Studio, Studio Lonca, Stüdyo 18 and Yıldız Technical University Voice Recording Studios. The vocal recordings of almost all the songs were performed by Ozan Bayraşa and a few of them were done by Emir Akbulut and Mustafa Karaduman. In April, mixing of the songs was finished and they began working on mastering. Mastering was done by Emre Kıral at Kaya Müzik Studios.

== Music and lyrics ==
Ben Bazen is a dance-pop album. It also contains a wide range of other musical elements, including deep house, R&B, rock, trap and türkü. The "use of different instruments and its richness in rhythm" are some of the album's strong points according to a number of critics. A variety of different musicians with different styles helped with the album's preparation. Simge later said that she was trying to create a story for the songs in this album, and stated: "This album is like a book of stories about a girl who doesn't give up and sometimes wants to go... It contains a lot of soul and emotions." She also said that the songs are a reflection of herself and "about a woman who talks about love in a sweet way, someone who does not cause pain for her partner".

The album's lead single "Ben Bazen" was written and composed by Ersay Üner, telling the story of a person who wants to get away from the environment she's trapped in. Despite having an acoustic beginning, together with its chorus it turns into a dance song. The song that comes after it, "Pes Etme", was written by Alper Narman and discusses how "one should stand behind her love". In Michael Kuyucu's opinion "Ram Ta Tam", written and composed by Selim Siyami, resembles "Pes Etme" as it "both can make you dance and make you sad" and its lyrics are centered on the similar theme. The fourth song, "Üzülmedin mi?", written by Ersay Üner, is centered around the ravage after facing an unfaithfulness. First performed by Onurr for his album Bir Kahramanlık Hikayesi (2017), "Hu" features instrumental elements and was re-recorded by Simge and put in as the album's fifth song. "Ayrılık Yazması" was written by Gökhan Şahin and composed by Simge herself. Composed by Alper Narman and Onurr, the seventh song "Aşkın Olayım" include pop rock elements and like the previous two songs is slow-paced.

The dance song "İster İnan İster İnanma" with its rising tempo, has sounds from Simge's concerts at its beginning and end, giving the listener the experience of a live event. In its arrangement, stringed voices stand out first, and the lyrics, written by Alper Narman and Onurr, are about the future of a love affair and the fact that the end is good or bad is uncertain. Sezen Aksu and Sibel Algan wrote the oriental song "Öpücem", and its composition features Greek and raï elements. Its main theme centers around the chase and escape between a person and her partner. "Yalnız Başına" with its guitar sounds and the electronic song "Kalp Kırmak" both have a slow-paced tempo. The song that follows them, "Aşkın Olayım" by Onurr, is of deep house style. The eleventh song "Üzülmedin mi?" is an acoustic recording. The final song "Gülümseyişinle Uyandım" was written and composed by Simge at the age of 14, her first ever musical work.

== Cover and release ==
The album's main cover shows Simge holding a guitar with one hand and a microphone with the other, and was first published by her on 27 May 2018 on her Instagram account. All of Ben Bazen's photographs, including its cover, were taken by Nihat Odabaşı in February at Hayyam Studio in Beyoğlu'. Simge's stylist for the photo shoot was Anıl Can, while Seçkin Songüç did her makeup and Nuri Şekerci served as her hairstylist. Michael Kuyucu, found the photographs "as successful as the album itself" and stated: "Finally a pop singer came out and took photos like a young normal girl, distancing herself from the image of a star performer". Music critic Yavuz Hakan Tok wrote: "There is Simge on the cover who emphasizes on her musician's side, which has become a visual that suits this album."

The album was released on 1 June 2018 by Doğan Music Company on Spotify Turkey and other digital platforms. At the same time, its physical sale began at the music markets. The album was given the Best Album award at the 7th Ayaklı Newspaper TV Stars Awards. It also earned Simge a nomination for the Best Female Pop Musician award at the 45th Golden Butterfly Awards. The album was also nominated for the Most Powerful Album award at the 2019 PowerTürk Music Awards. Its lead single received a nomination as the Most Powerful Song and Simge herself was a nominee for the Most Powerful Female Singer award. At the 16th Radio Boğaziçi Music Awards, Simge won the Best Female Pop Music Artist award. The album was also nominated for the Best Album award but lost it to Mabel Matiz's Maya (2018). According to Telifmetre, Simge was the second female artist with the most number of streams in Turkey in 2018 after Hande Yener. She was also the female singer with the most number of listeners on the digital music platform Muud and the fifth female artist with the most number of streams on Spotify Türkiye.

== Promotion ==
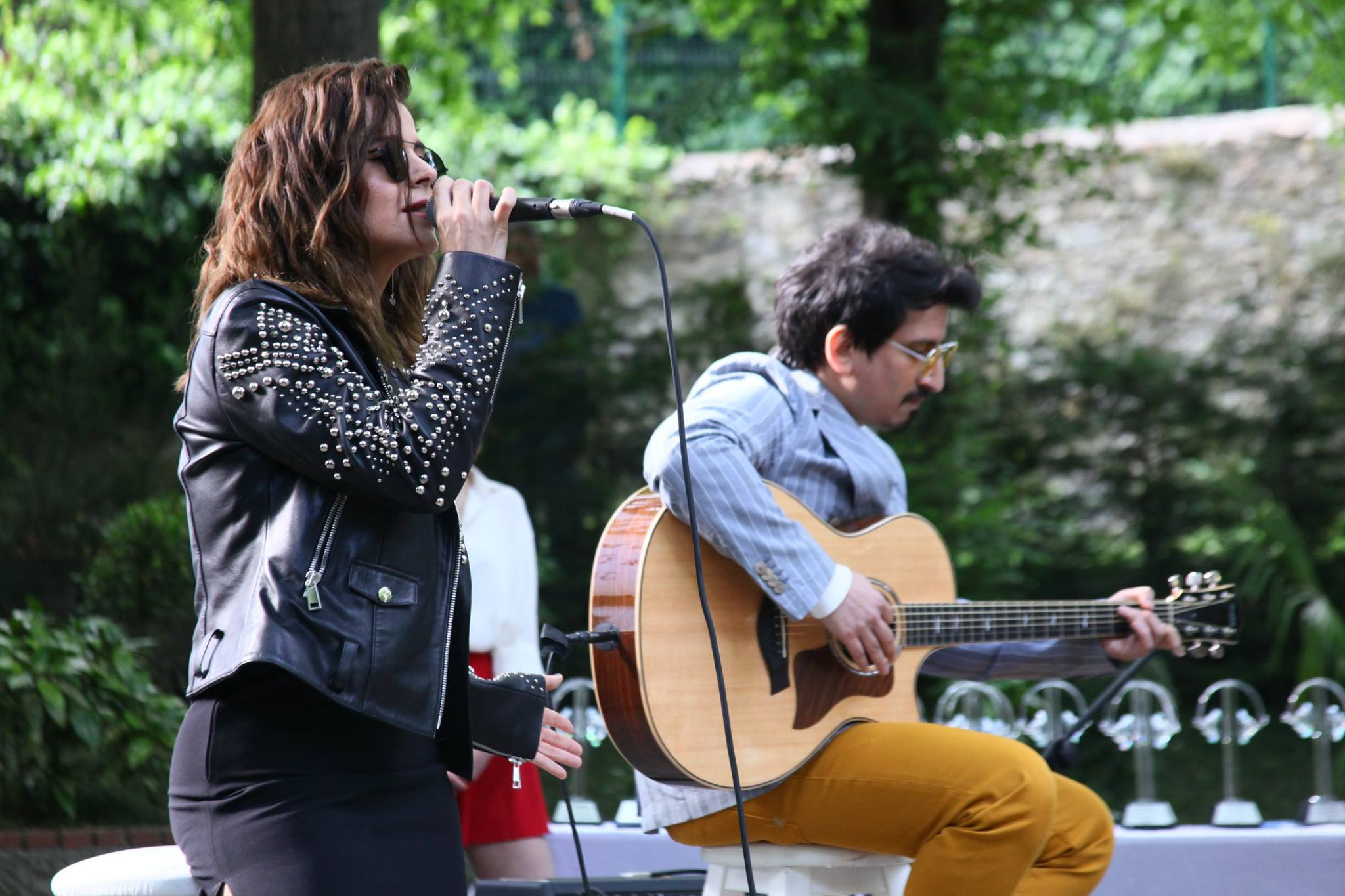
Simge, together with Ozan Bayraşa, performs "Üzülmedin mi?" at the 15th Radio Boğaziçi Music Awards, May 2018

Simge promoted Ben Bazen through digital music platforms, concerts, television and radio programs. A part of the promotion was done by Spotify Türkiye, through advertisement in the main area of Istanbul and on the billboards and shopping centers. Also, to announce the album's release, Spotify placed Simge's name on top of its Türkçe Pop list for one week. Alongside the promotion on digital platforms, Simge began to give concerts in various locations in Turkey and Northern Cyprus after the album's release. She also had a live performance on Pal FM, appeared on an interview with Radio Boğaziçi, took part in Show Radio's Cafe Show and appeared on TRT FM's program Ada Vapuru. In June, together with Edis, she appeared on NTV's program En Güzel Buluşmalar and talked about her career and the album's preparation process. In October, a party with the theme of kissing was held in Karaköy, Beyoğlu, for her song "Öpücem" (I'll Kiss). She later appeared on CNN Türk's program Şeffaf Oda by Güneri Cıvaoğlu and then on TV8's program Eser Yenenler Show and performed songs from her album. She also appeared in Habertürk TV's program Aslı Şafak'la İşin Aslı, together with album's photographer Nihat Odabaşı and gave information about the album's visual designing.

=== Music videos ===
The songs "Üzülmedin mi?" was prepared to be released together with the album, but Simge later decided to release it as a promotional single on 29 November 2017. Its music video was also released on the same day. The video was directed by Murat Joker and recorded in Nişantaşı, Şişli, over the course of one day, and its scenario was based on a dream that Simge had seen before recording the video. The story is about the unfaithfulness of a partner and was written and prepared together with Ali Tank and Begüm Tank. The song ranked number-one on Türkçe Top 20 on its first week of release. It also received the Best Song award at the 15th Radio Boğaziçi Music Awards. According to Telifmetre, "Üzülmedin mi?" was the sixth most-streamed song on radio and television in 2018.

The second music video was released for the song "Ben Bazen" on 4 June 2018, three days after the album's release. It was recorded on 11–13 April in Göcek, Fethiye, and directed by Murat Joker. The clip shows Simge dancing in a natural environment. Simge explained the meaning of the music video with these words: "In the clip, we showed a free-spirited woman who just wanted to leave [her problems behind]. In fact, we can say that it shows a girl dancing while going through life." The video ranked first on MusicTopTR's List of Fastest Rising Works and then placed third on Türkçe Top 20. The song also ranked seventh on Spotify Türkiye's list of most listened songs in 2018. The song was nominated for the Best Song award at the 16th Radio Boğaziçi Music Awards.

The third music video was released for "Öpücem" on 27 September 2018. During its preparation process Simge took dance lessons and Gülşen Aybaba directed the video which was shot over the course of 16 hours in Kilyos, Sarıyer. Mısırlı Ahmet also had an appearance on the video, playing tom-tom drum. Posta found Simge's dance scenes with a transparent outfit similar to Britney Spears's music video for "Toxic" (2004). Milliyet's Mayk Şişman also made a similar comparison. "Öpücem" ranked first on Turkey's official music chart. The song won the Song of the Year award at the Magazinn.com Video Music Awards and the 19th Internet Media Best of the Year Awards.

The fourth music video, "Aşkın Olayım" (Onurr version), was released on 23 February 2019. The video was directed by Murat Joker and Simge was accompanied by Portuguese model Marcos Santos in it. Habertürk's Oben Budak believed that choosing the deep house Onurr version out of the two available versions of the song in the album showed "Simge's courage in trying new things". After releasing the music video for "Aşkın Olayım", Simge released a single titled "As Bayrakları" together with its music video in August 2019. The fifth music video from Ben Bazen, "Yalnız Başına", was released on 14 October 2019. The video was directed by Seçkin Süngüç and recorded in New York City. Simge later released four different music videos for the songs "Pes Etme", "Ram Ta Tam", "İster İnan İster İnanma" and "Gülümseyişinle Uyandım" on 25 February 2020. The music videos showed Simge against monochromatic backgrounds and were directed by Seçkin Süngüç.

== Critical reception ==
Ben Bazen received positive reviews from various music critics. The rhythm variety in the songs was appreciated and the collaboration with Ozan Bayraşa throughout the album was found successful. The critics also pointed out the "quality and coolness" in the songs. Hürriyet's Naim Dilmener gave the album 4 out of 5 and stated that it had "renewed pop" and "All of the songs are above average.... All of the musicians have designed melodies suitable for the highly melodic and perfectly vocalized songs. None of the selected rhythms are dry; even in fast songs, they have avoided leaning on a single rhythm. Ben Bazen is a good album. Simge was curious about what to do after the success of her single, and her concerns resulted in a very good work." Hikmet Demirkol from the same newspaper pointed out the different music style in the album and said: "Among the musical works of Simge, it's a hit made as a result of bold and firm steps... It's an exquisite album made out of songs that connect together like a chain of pearls." Demirkol later included Ben Bazen in his list of 2018's best albums. Milliyet's Mayk Şişman praised the teamwork in the songs and noted the settling of Simg's musical style with this album: "It's right to praise this album, as Simge's Ben Bazen is a result of her moving towards her musical goals, and addressing her musical concerns."

Hayat Müzik's critic Yavuz Hakan Tok also praised the album and wrote: "It takes sufficient influence from both past and present, the elements and the genre have been chosen correctly, the musicality is good, Ben Bazen is a good pop album. Simge shows her progress after the success of her previous pop singles with this new album. While it consolidates her position, it also assures you what you can expect next." On his review, Michael Kuyucu liked the album and praised Ozan Bayraşa's arrangements and said: "Simge shows justified success and rise in this album.... An excellent album when it comes to the interpretation of Simge's work and image, and the arrangements and the sound of the songs." Habertürk's Oben Budak found the album successful and wrote: "It is not an album that you will go and listen to once and set it aside after, or to get tired of it after listening to it for the third time, its content needs to be digested." He also believed that Simge was "one of the rare names that could break the boring uniformity of pop music." NTV.com.tr's reviewer Suat Kavukluoğlu, who praised the teamwork in the album, wrote that the songs formed a bridge to the past: "Feeding itself from the roots of pop music, Ben Bazen is based on the works of many legendary figures from Madonna to Sezen Aksu."

== Track listing ==
No.	Title	Writer(s)	Composer(s)	Length
1.	"Ben Bazen"	Ersay Üner	Ersay Üner	3:38
2.	"Pes Etme"	Alper Narman	Ersay Üner · Ozan Bayraşa · Simge Sağın	3:52
3.	"Ram Ta Tam"	Selim Siyami Sümer	Selim Siyami Sümer	3:16
4.	"Üzülmedin mi?"	Ersay Üner	Ersay Üner	5:03
5.	"Hu"	Alper Narman · Onurr	Alper Narman · Onurr	4:33
6.	"Ayrılık Yazması"	Gökhan Şahin	Simge Sağın	4:19
7.	"Aşkın Olayım"	Onurr	Onurr	4:11
8.	"İster İnan İster İnanma"	Alper Narman · Onurr	Alper Narman · Onurr	4:02
9.	"Öpücem"	Sezen Aksu · Sibel Algan	Sezen Aksu	4:30
10.	"Yalnız Başına"	Çağrı Telkıvıran	Çağrı Telkıvıran	3:10
11.	"Kalp Kırmak"	Alper Narman · Simge Sağın · Yasemin Özler	Ozan Bayraşa · Simge Sağın · Yasemin Özler · Çağrı Telkıvıran	4:02
12.	"Aşkın Olayım" (Onurr)	Onurr	Onurr	4:22
13.	"Üzülmedin mi?" (Acoustic)	Ersay Üner	Ersay Üner	4:25
14.	"Gülümseyişinle Uyandım"	Simge Sağın	Simge Sağın	1:39
Total length:				55:02

== Personnel ==
=== Musicians ===
- Simge Sağın – vocals (all of the songs), backing vocals (2, 7, 8), songwriter (14), composer (2, 4, 6)
- Ozan Bayraşa – composer (2), backing vocals (2, 4, 7), classic guitar (1), acoustic guitar (4, 7), piano (3, 5), electric guitar (3, 7), bass (3, 8), acoustic bass (7), mute guitar (7), synth solo (7), ukulele (4, 5), ukulele bass (5) keyboard programming (4), whistle (8), producer, music director, arranger (1, 2, 3, 4, 5, 7, 8), vocal coach, vocal recording and edit (1-5, 7, 8, 10-12, 14)
- Ersay Üner – songwriter (1, 4), composer (1, 2, 4), keyboard programming (4)
- Alper Narman – songwriter (2, 5, 8), composer (5, 8)
- Onurr – songwriter (5, 7, 8), composer (5, 7, 8), backing vocals (8)
- Selim Siyami Sümer – songwriter (3), composer (3), electric guitar (1, 4, 8)
- Gökhan Şahin – songwriter (6)
- Mehmet Çelik – flugelhorn (1, 5), trumpet (3)
- Anıl Şallıel – flute (3, 5, 8), alto saxophone (4)
- Berna Anter – backing vocals (3, 5, 7, 8)
- Fatih Ertür – backing vocals (3, 5, 7, 8)
- Pınar Çubukçu – backing vocals (3, 5, 7, 8, 9)
- Şahin Kurnaz – backing vocals (3, 5, 7, 8)
- Türker Çolak – percussion (4)
- Erdem Sökmen – acoustic guitar (6), classic guitar (5, 6)
- Serhan Yasdıman – toneless guitar (5)
- Serkan Ölçer – palmas (5), kahon (5)
- Mehmet Emin Bitmez – oud (5)
- Can Barış Özbilgin – piano (5)
- Caner Güneysu – guitar (9), rhythm guitar (5)
- İstanbul Strings – bowed string instruments (5, 6, 8, 9)
- Erdem Yörük – arranger (6)
- Birkan Şener – toneless bass (6)
- Timur Atasever – cello (6)
- Mustafa İpekçioğlu – cümbüş (6)
- Serkan Halili – qanun (6)
- Nağme Yakın – classic kemenche (6)
- Mehmet Akatay – Turkish style percussion (6)
- Mehmet Esemen – arpeggio guitar (7) solo guitar (7), slide guitar (7)
- Gültekin Kaçar – solo guitar (7)
- Erhan Bayrak – arranger (9), keyboard (9)
- Sezen Aksu – songwriter (9), composer (9)
- Sibel Algan – songwriter (9)
- Ali Yılmaz – oud (9), cümbüş
- Ahmed Ammar Ramzy – percussion (9)
- Aylin Alaz Bayrak – backing vocals (9)
- Cihan Okan – backing vocals (9)
- Ercüment Vural – backing vocals (9)

=== Production and recording ===
- Emre Kıral (Kaya Müzik) – mastering, mixing (1, 3, 4, 5)
- Tarık Ceran – mixing (2)
- Özgür Yurtoğlu – mixing (6, 8)
- Murat Bulut – mixing (7)
- Onur Selçuk – vocal coach (6, 13)
- Cihan Okan – vocal coach (9)
- Emir Akbulut – vocal recording (6, 13)
- Mustafa Karaduman – vocal recording (9), bowed string instrument recording and edit (9)
- Utku Ünsal – edit (10), rhythm guitar recording and edit (5)
- Tarkan Tekyıldız – recording assistant (5, 6, 8-10)
- Emir Akbulut – group vocals recording (2, 3, 5, 7, 8, 10)
- Çağdaş Şenel – solo guitar recording (7)
- Mustafa Karaduman – mixing (9)
- Serkan Kula – mixing (9)

=== Design and management ===
- DMC – production
- Nihat Odabaşı – photography
- Hale Güvenen – design
- Alper Sertman – assistant, general coordinator
- Seçkin Songüç – make-up
- Nuri Şekerci – hair
- Anıl Can – styling
- GD Ofset – printing

Credits adapted from Ben Bazen's album booklet.

== Release history ==
Country	Date	Format(s)	Label	Ref.
Turkey	1 June 2018	CD; digital download	DMC	
Worldwide	1 June 2018	Digital download	DMC	
