= Ben Buraya Çıplak Geldim =

Studio album by Nil Karaibrahimgil
- Released: 5 July 2012
- Genre: Pop rock, rock
- Label: DMC; GNL Entertainment

Nil Karaibrahimgil chronology
Nil Kıyısında (2009)	Ben Buraya Çıplak Geldim (2012)	Nil'den İyi Gelen Sesler (2019)

Ben Buraya Çıplak Geldim (English: I Came Here Naked) is the fifth album of Nil Karaibrahimgil, a female Turkish music singer-songwriter, released on 5 July 2012.

== Mini clips ==
Album is promoted by 1 minute mini-clips for 8 song in the album. First mini-clip is directed by Uğurcan Ataoğlu and Selin Akıncı for "He-Man" released on 29 May 2012. Second mini-clip is directed by Pelin Kırca for "Kazablanka" released on 30 May 2012. Third mini-clip is directed by Memed Erdener for "Kader Efendi" released on 31 May 2012. Fourth mini-clip is directed by Baran Baran for "Yürüdün mü?" released on 1 June 2012. Fifth mini-clip is directed by Aslı Yazıcıoğlu for "Ay Gız Uyan!" released on 2 June 2012. Sixth mini-clip is directed by Nermin Er for "Nesi Var?" released on 3 June 2012. Seventh mini-clip is directed by Selin Akıncı for "Allahımı Şaşırıcam" released on 5 June 2012. Eighth mini-clip is directed by Ali Taner Baltacı for "İstanbuldayım" released on 7 June 2012. The song was previously released for Pazarları Hiç Sevmem soundtrack on YouTube on 26 March 2012.

== Track listing ==
#	Title	English translation	Written by
1	"Heman"	He-Man	Karaibrahimgil
2	"Ben Buraya Çıplak Geldim"	I came here naked	Karaibrahimgil
3	"İstanbuldayım"	I'm in Istanbul	Karaibrahimgil
4	"Kazablanka"	Casablanca	Karaibrahimgil
5	"Hakkında Her Şeyi Duymak İstiyorum"	I want to hear everything about you	Karaibrahimgil
6	"Ay Gız Uyan!"	Oh girl, wake up!	Karaibrahimgil, Arif
7	"Kader Efendi"	Mr. Destiny	Karaibrahimgil
8	"Nesi Var?"	What's wrong with him/her?	Karaibrahimgil
9	"Allahımı Şaşırıcam"	I'll confuse my god	Esirci, Karaibrahimgil
10	"Yürüdün mü?"	Did you walk?	Karaibrahimgil
11	"İstanbul'da Sonbahar"	Autumn in Istanbul	Teoman

A: "Ay Gız" is a common phrase in Azerbaijani. Also it can be translated as "Moon (faced) girl, wake up!"

== Sales ==
Country	Sales
Turkey (MÜ-YAP)	29,992
