= Kanlıca Cemetery =

Cemetery in Istanbul, Turkey

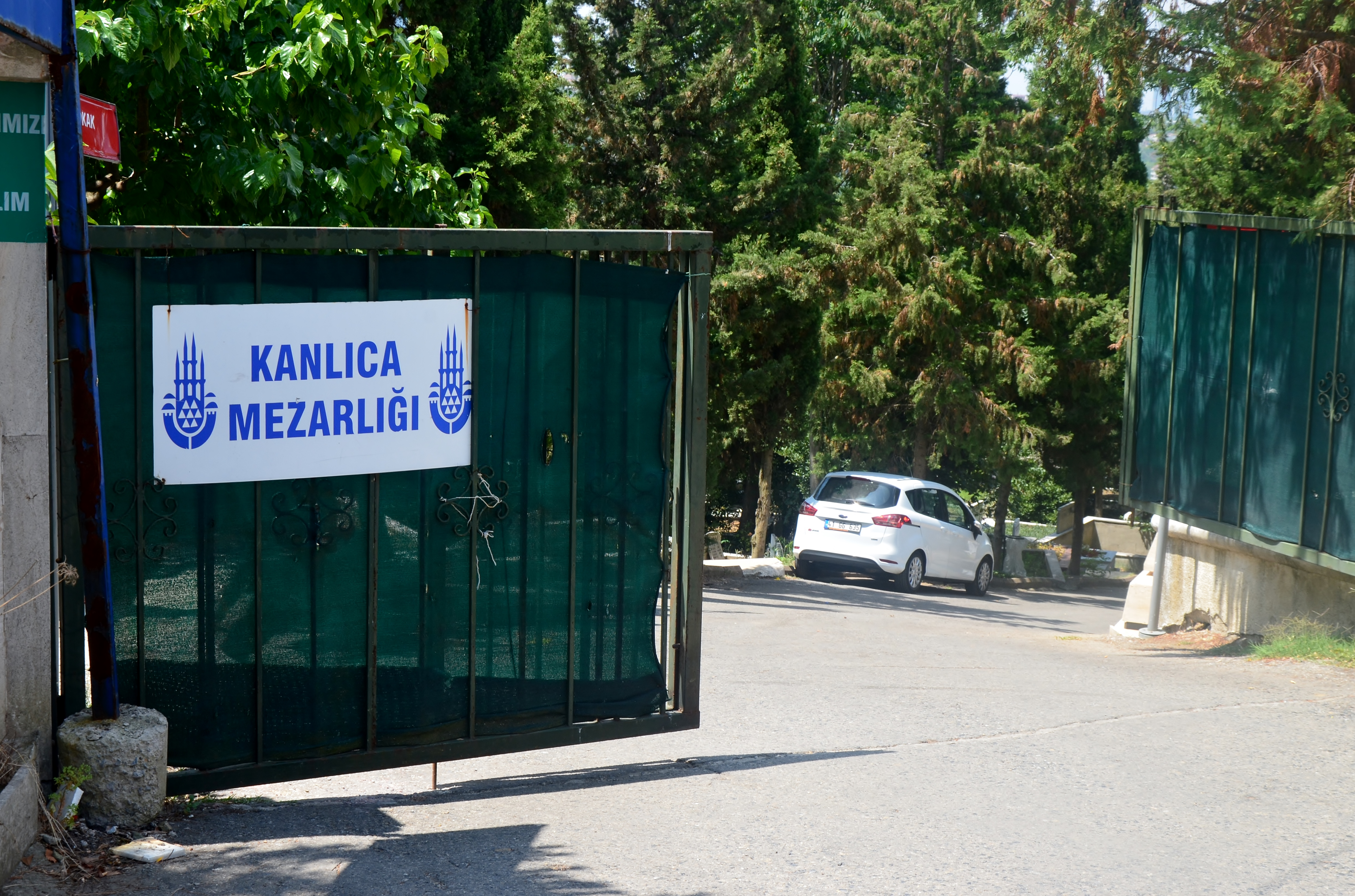
- Main entrance of Kanlıca Cemetery.
- Interactive map of Kanlıca Cemetery

Details
- Location: Kanlıca, Beykoz, Istanbul
- Country: Turkey
- Coordinates: 41°05′51″N 29°03′57″E
- Type: Public
- Owned by: Istanbul Metropolitan Municipality

The Kanlıca Cemetery (Turkish: Kanlıca Mezarlığı) is a burial ground located on the Asian part of Istanbul, Turkey. It is administered by the Metropolitan Municipality. Many prominent figures from the world of media and music rest here.

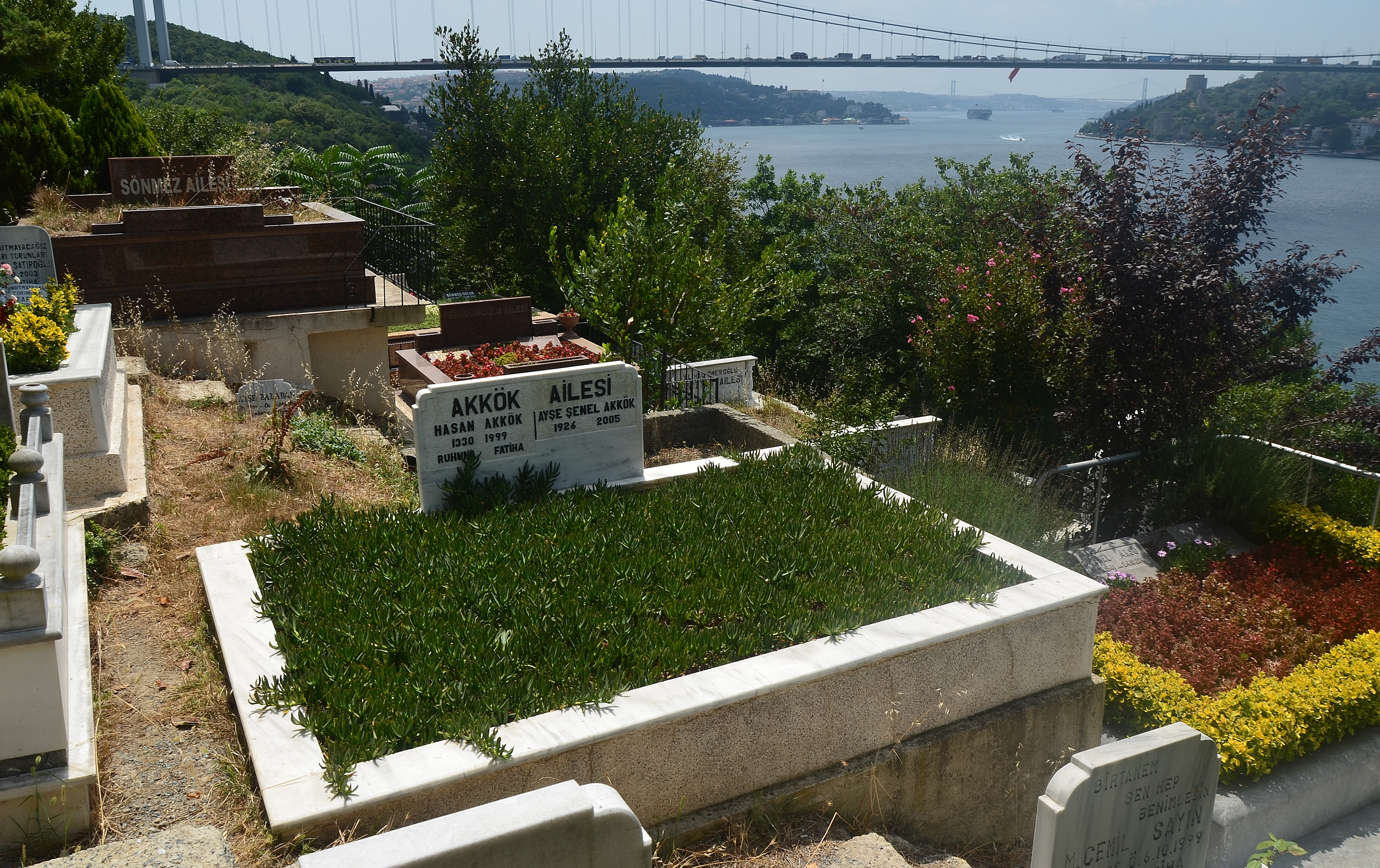
Kanlıca Cemetery overlooking the Bosphorus with the Fatih Sultan Mehmet Bridge in the background.

Situated on a hillside east of Kanlıca neighborhood of Beykoz district overlooking Bosphorus, it is also known as the "Mihrimah Sultan Cemetery" (Turkish: Mihrimah Sultan Mezarlığı) after Mihrimah Sultan (1522–1578), the daughter of Ottoman sultan Suleiman the Magnificent (reigned 1520–1566).

== Notable burials ==
Listed in alphabetical order of family names:

- Kayahan Açar (1949–2015), pop music singer-songwriter.
- Barış Manço (1943–1999), rock musician, singer, songwriter, composer, and television producer.
- Yaşar Nuri Öztürk (1945–2016), university professor of Islamic theology, Quranist Muslim, lawyer, columnist and a former member of Turkish parliament.
- Sedat Simavi (1896–1953), journalist, writer and film director.

== Gallery ==
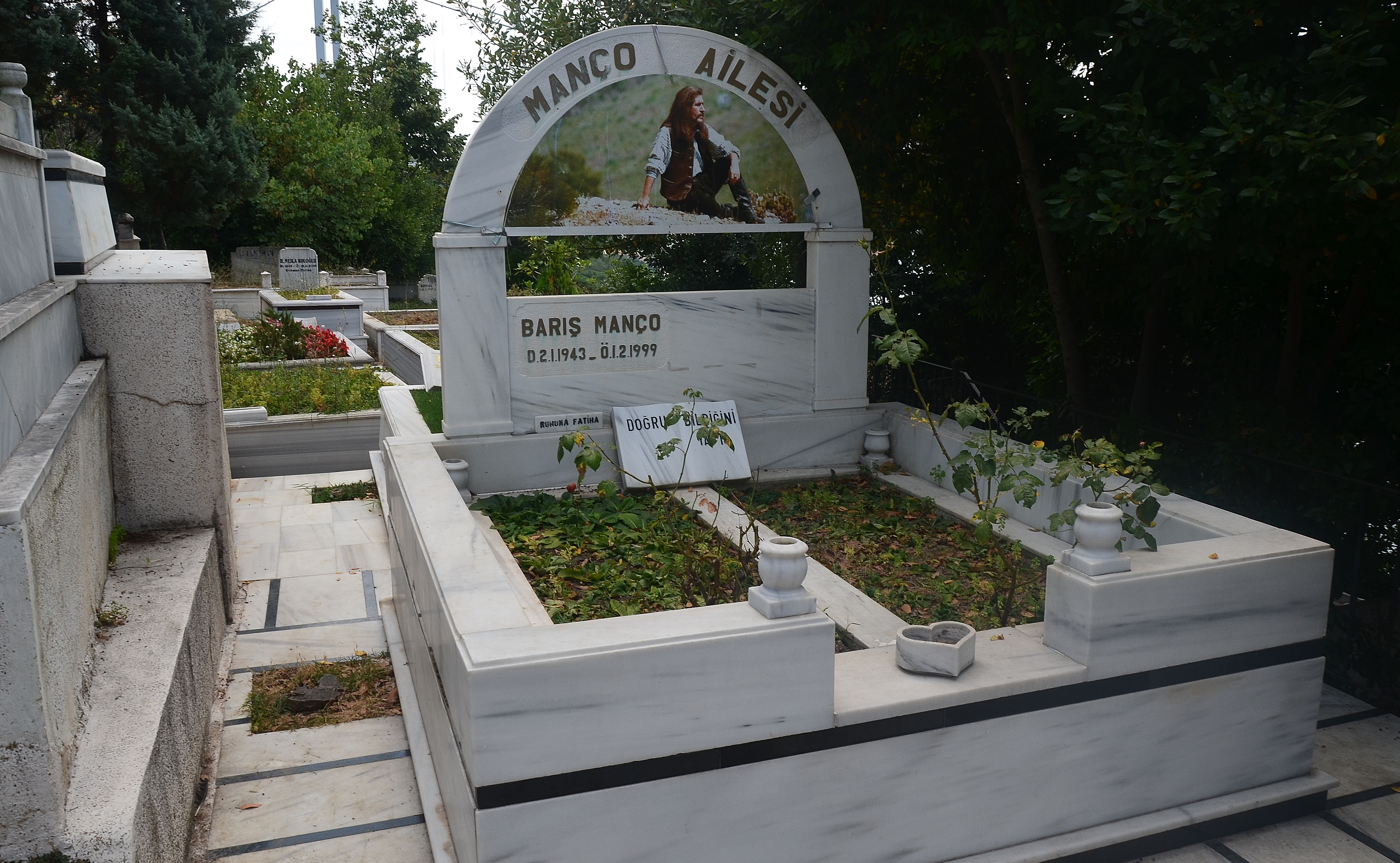
The grave of Barış Manço.

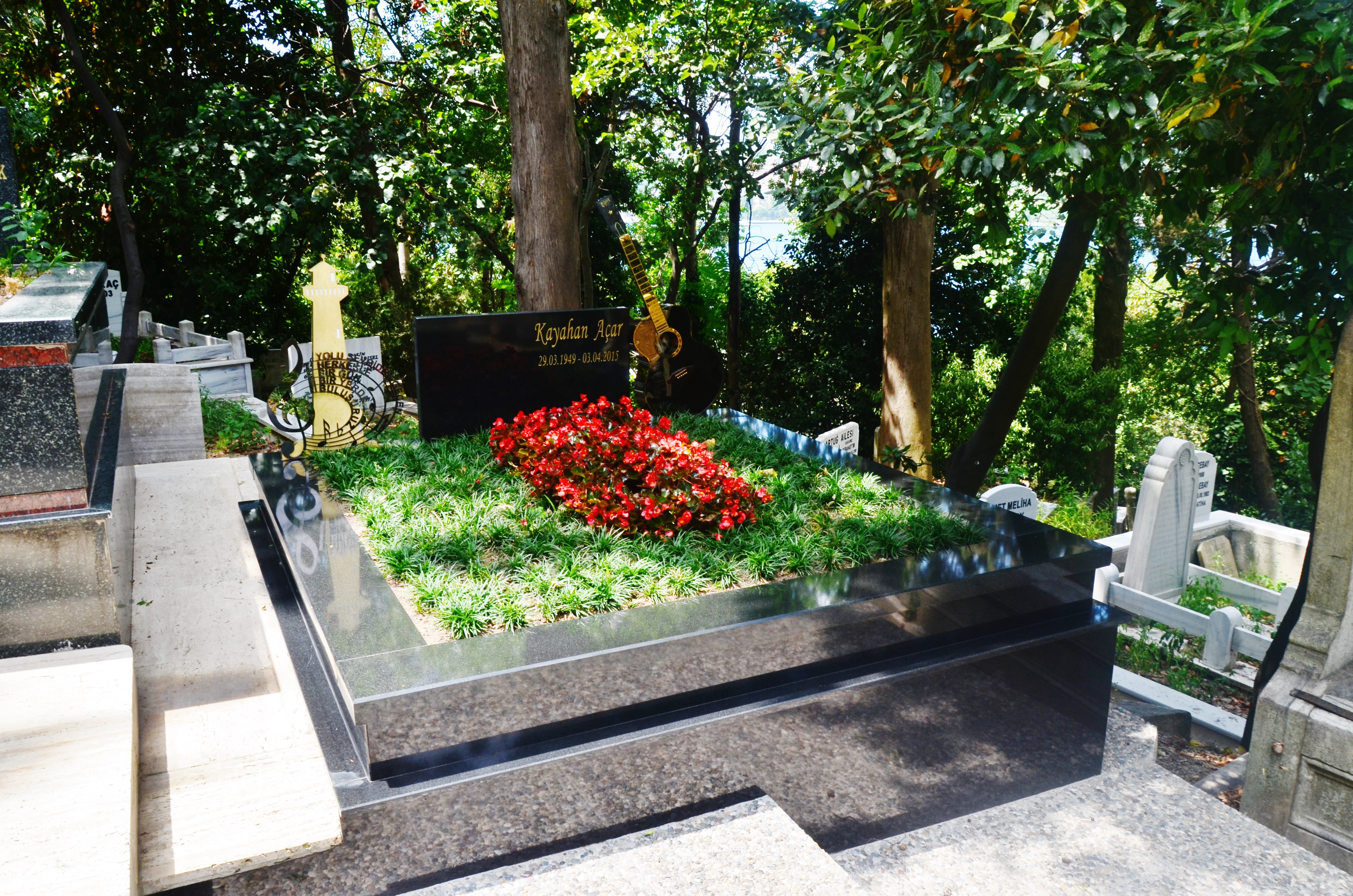
The grave of Kayahan Açar.

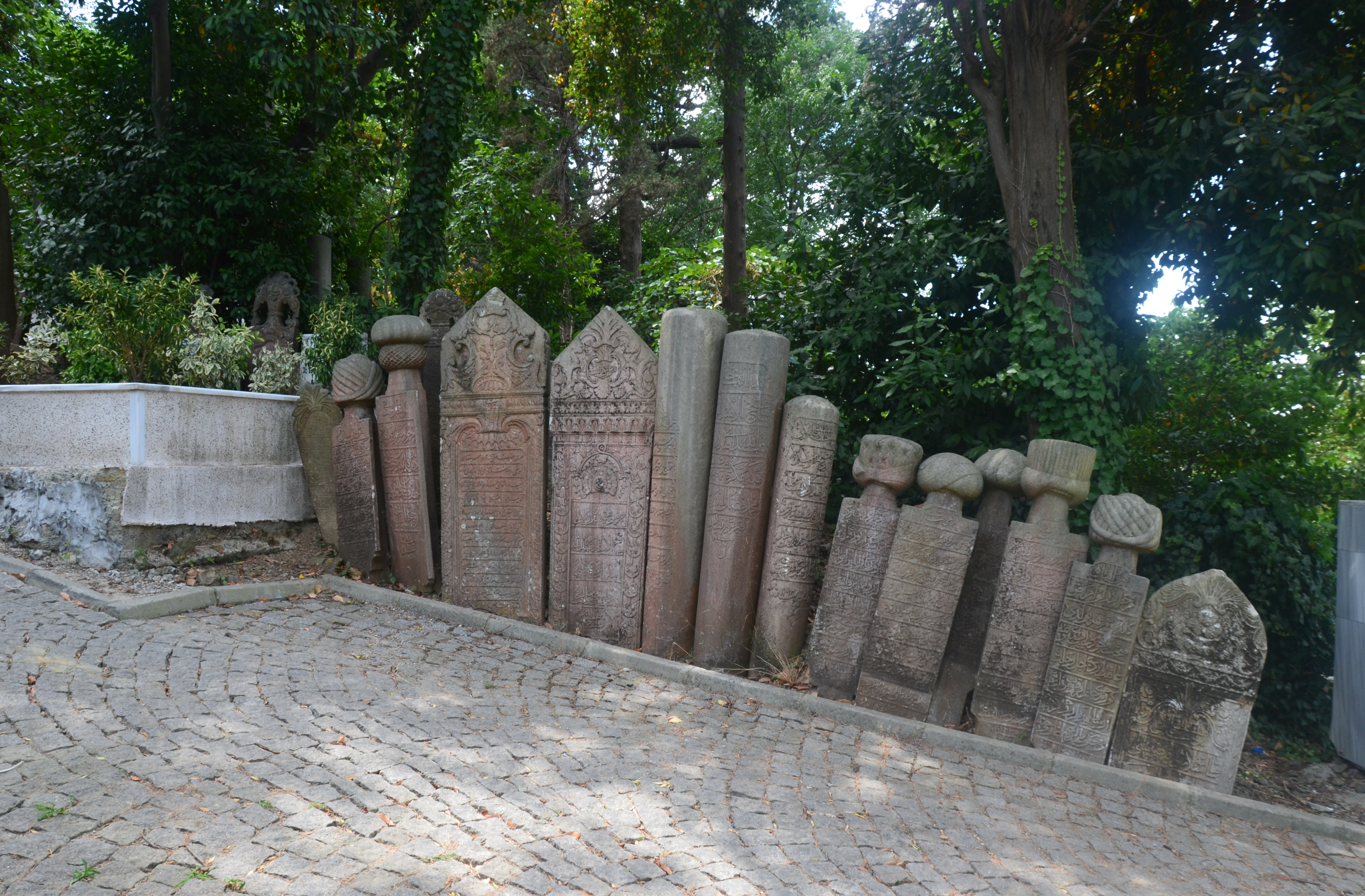
Ottoman Empire era gravestones.
