= Atiye =

Turkish pop singer

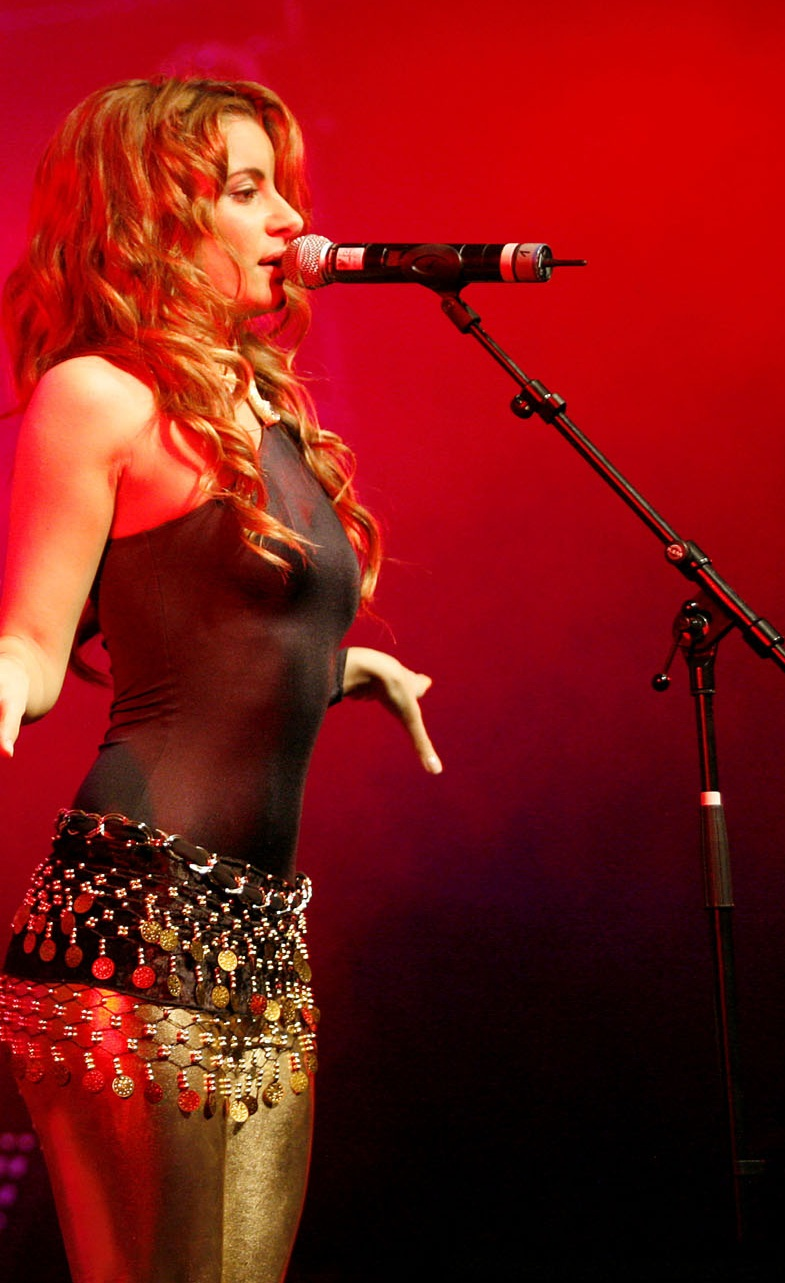
- Atiye in 2007
- Born: Deniz Atiye Yılmaz; 22 November 1988 (age 37); Bremen, West Germany
- Other name: Atiye Deniz
- Occupations: Singer, songwriter, dancer
- Spouse: Erol Sebebci (m. 2018)
- Children: 3
- Musical career
- Genres: Pop, EDM, dance
- Instruments: Vocals; goblet drum
- Years active: 2007–present
- Labels: Akels; Sony; Arista; Pasaj; Tonpool; Poll; Columbia
- Website: www.atiye.com

Deniz Atiye Yılmaz (born 22 November 1988), originally known by the artist name Atiye Deniz (Turkish pronunciation: [atiˈje deˈniz]) and later by the mononym Atiye, is a Turkish pop singer. She releases songs in Turkish and English.

== Career ==
The second album by Atiye was self-titled and released under Sony Music label. It spawned a number of hits for the artist. The lead single "Muamma" and the second single "Salla" became huge hits in Turkey. They peaked at respectively No.5 and No.3 at the official Turkish chart.

In 2011, she became the Best Turkish Act at the MTV Europe Music Awards.

== Personal life ==
Atiye was born on 22 November 1988 to a Turkish father of Arab descent and Dutch mother. Her paternal family is from Antakya. She spent her childhood in Netherlands, the United States and Turkey. She studied arts at the CKE in the Netherlands and moved to Turkey in 2008. Besides speaking German, Turkish and Dutch, she also speaks English and French whilst learning Spanish. In 2018, she married producer and music director Erol Sebebci, with whom she has three daughters.

== Discography ==
=== Albums ===
- Gözyaşlarım 2007 Sony Music
- Atiye 2009 Sony Music
- Budur 2011 Pasaj
- Soygun Var 2013 Pasaj
- Deli İşi 2022 Mikslarj

=== Singles ===
- "Yetmez" (2014)
- "Sor" (2015)
- "Come to Me" (2015)
- "Abrakadabra" (2015)
- "İnşallah Canım Ya" (2016)
- "Cimali Vali" (from the Bana Git De movie soundtrack) (2016)
- "Zamansız Aşklar" (2017)
- "Radiant Night" (2017)
- "We Got That La" (2017)
- "Hisset" (2018)
- "Tom Tom" (2019)
- "Anne" (2023)

=== Duets ===
- Kal (with Teoman)
- Güzelim (with Sultana)
- Aşkistan (with Ozan Doğulu)
- Nasıl Yani (with İskender Paydaş & Mirkelam)

=== Tribute Songs ===
- "Sefam Olsun" (from Selami Şahin Şarkıları 1) (2023)
- "Unutmayacağım" (from İbrahim Erkal Hürmet) (2023)

== Filmography ==
- Bu İşte Bir Yalnızlık Var (2013)
- Bana Git De (2016) – (Leyal)
