= Güliz Ayla =

Turkish singer

- Born: 27 April 1988 (age 38); Samsun, Turkey
- Genre: Pop
- Years active: 2015–present
- Labels: Sony; Columbia

Güliz Ayla (born 27 April 1988) is a Turkish singer and songwriter. She released her eponymous debut album in September 2015.

== Life and career ==
She attended the Samsun municipality conservatory for two years, studying theatre and drama. She graduated from Samsun Anadolu High School.

In 2006, she joined the Adelaide band. They became the winner of the Rock'n Dark Express Rock Music contest. She also sang in two of Müjdat Gezen's musicals.

She released her first single "Olmazsan Olmaz" in 2015. The song became the most searched song in Turkey on the music platform Shazam. Her eponymous debut album was released on 18 September 2015 with the help of Turkish singer Sıla Gençoğlu and composer Efe Bahadır. She promoted the album by launching the bahsetmemlazim.com (Turkish: I need to tell) website, where she responded to fan letters and tweets. "Bahsetmem Lazım", written by Christos Dantis and Ayla, became the first music video of the album.

== Discography ==
=== Studio albums ===
- Güliz Ayla (2015)
- Parla (2017)

=== Singles ===
- "İlk Öpücük Benden Olsun" (2016)
- "Kimin Umrunda" (with Bahadır Tatlıöz) (2018)
- "Öldür Beni (Ufuk Kevser Remix)" (2019)
- "Öyle Sev" (2019)
- "Mıknatıs" (with Ege Çubukçu) (2019)
- "Öyle Sev (Acoustic)" (2019)
- "Sarmaşık" (2020)
- "Evdekilere Söyle" (2021)
- "Şivesi Sensin Aşkın" (2021)
- "Al Yorgun Kalbimi" (2022)
- "An'da" (2023)
- "Gımıldan" (2023)
- "Ömrüm" (from the album İbrahim Erkal Hürmet) (2023)
- "Hücumdayım" (2023)

=== Music videos ===
List of music videos
Year	Music video	Album	Director(s)
2015	"Olmazsan Olmaz"	Güliz Ayla	Ergin Turunç
2015	"Bahsetmem Lazım"	Güliz Ayla	İmre Haydaroğlu
2016	"İlk Öpücük Benden Olsun"	Non-album single	Nihat Odabaşı
2017	"Bilirkişi"	Parla	Null
2018	"Yetmedi Mi"	Parla	Görkem Yenilmez
2018	"Gelsin Öpsün Kalbimi"	Parla	Gülşen Aybaba
2018	"Kimin Umrunda"	Non-album single	
2019	"Öldür Beni (Ufuk Kevser Remix)"	Non-album single	Gözde Günar
2019	"Öyle Sev"	Non-album single	Murad Küçük
2019	"Öyle Sev (Acoustic)"	Non-album single	Emir Yargın
2019	"Mıknatıs"	Non-album single	Melih Kun
2020	"Sarmaşık"	Non-album single	Murat Joker
2021	"Evdekilere Söyle"	Non-album single	Melih Kun
2021	"Şivesi Sensin Aşkın"	Non-album single	Gökhan Özdemir
2022	"Al Yorgun Kalbimi"	Non-album single	Gökhan Özdemir
2023	"An'da"	Non-album single	Halil Güzel
2023	"Gımıldan"	Non-album single	Gökhan Özdemir
2023	"Ömrüm"	İbrahim Erkal Hürmet	Gökhan Özdemir
2023	"Hücumdayım"	Non-album single	Gökhan Özdemir
