= Yeni Çıktı =

2011 extended play record by Simge

EP by Simge
- Released: 4 March 2011
- Genre: Pop
- Length: 22:37
- Label: Kaya
- Producer: Erdem Kınay

Simge chronology
Yeni Çıktı (2011)	Ben Bazen (2018)

Yeni Çıktı (New Output) is the first extended play by Turkish singer Simge. It was released on 31 March 2011 by Kaya Müzik.

== Release and content ==
The EP consists of six songs in total. Producing the songs lasted for one year. Erdem Kınay, Alper Narman and Gökhan Şahin were the EP's composers. It was produced by Doğan Karakaya. Emre Aksu served as the project's supervisor.

Simge herself later talked about the album: "I've lived with the dream of making an album for many years. I slept with this dream, I woke up with this dream. While I present my first album called Yeni Çıktı to all music lovers, I think I have done a successful job in the music industry. As the first step to begin reaching my dreams, I'm in front of you with a new sound."

== Track listing ==
No.	Title	Writer(s)	Composer(s)	Length
1.	"Başı Dertte"	Gökhan Şahin	Erdem Kınay	3:45
2.	"Ödeme Vakti"	Şahin	Kınay	4:24
3.	"Vicdanın Affetsin"	Şahin	Kınay	4:00
4.	"Misafir"	Şahin	Kınay	3:23
5.	"Issız Ada"	Alper Narman	Kınay	3:23
6.	"Palavra"	Şahin	Kınay	3:42
Total length:				22:37

== Release history ==
Country	Date	Format(s)	Label
Turkey	31 March 2011	CD · Digital download	Kaya Müzik
Worldwide	4 March 2011	Digital download	Kaya Müzik
