= Berkay (singer) =

Turkish singer (born 1981)

- Born: Mehmet Şahin; 29 December 1981 (age 43); Ankara, Turkey
- Occupation: Singer
- Spouse: Özlem Ada Katipoğlu (m. 2016)
- Children: 2
- Musical career
- Genres: Pop; arabesque
- Years active: 2009–present
- Labels: Poll; Avrupa
- Website: www.berkaysahin.com.tr

Berkay Şahin (born 29 December 1981) is a Turkish singer originally a Laz descendant.

Berkay was a resident of İzmir from 1996, where he resided with his mother until 2009, after which he moved to Istanbul. Before releasing an album, he performed in Bodrum, Antalya, Çeşme and Kuşadası. He made his professional debut in 2010 by releasing his first studio album, titled Ele İnat. The album was well received by the listeners, and a second album followed in 2012.

Berkay got into a brawl with Arda Turan in 2018 which ended with a broken nose for the pop singer. Turan appeared at the hospital with a gun, allegedly begging for forgiveness from Berkay, and panic ensued after the footballer fired the weapon at the ground. Arda Turan received a suspended sentence of 2 years and 8 months after being found guilty of firing a gun to cause panic, illegal possession of weapons and intentional injury. Turan will not serve his jail term if no further incidents occur for five years.

== Discography ==
Studio albums

- Ele İnat (2010)
- Aşk Melekleri (2014)
- Benim Hikayem (2015)
- Arabest (2016)
- Yansıma (2017)
- İz (2019)

Singles

- Aşk Sadece (2012)
- Doksana Bir Kala (2013)
- Uygun Adım (2016)
- Ey Aşk (2017)
- Ben Sadece (2018)
- İsyanlardayım (Ahmet Selçuk İlkan Unutulmayan Şarkılar, Vol. 2) (2018)
- Deliler (2019)
- Deli Et Beni (2019)
- İki Hece (2019)
- Kırgınım Ona (2020)
- Dert Faslı (2020)
- Yeter ki Sen İste (2021)
- Karnaval (2021)
- Yan (2021)
- Atma (Piyanist 2) (2022)
- Bal Badem (2022)
- En Güzelinden (2022)

== Awards ==
Year	Award	Category
2010	14th İstanbul FM Golden Awards	Best Debut by a Male Artist
2011	17th Kral TV Video Music Awards	Best Debut by a Singer
2011	A.G.D Awards	Best Debut by an Artist
2011	Turkish Association of Disabled People Bests of the Year Awards	Best Debut by a Male Singer
2011	38th Golden Butterfly Awards	Best Debut by a Soloist
2011	Taksiciler Günü Awards	Best Debut by an Artist
2012	Istanbul Kültür University Awards	Pop Artist of the Year
2015	5th Life Without Barriers Foundation Awards	Best Album of the Year (Aşk Melekleri)
2016	5th TURKMUSC Awards	Best Male Artist of the Year
