= Soner Arıca =

Turkish singer and record producer

Soner Arıca (born 5 February 1966) is a Turkish singer and record producer.

== Biography ==
He was born as the youngest of seven children in the Fatsa district of Ordu Province, Turkey. Later, he moved to Istanbul and studied in Şişli College. Having graduated from the college, he continued his education and obtained a degree in economics from Marmara University. In 1986, he became a professional model. He had a modelling career for five years. In 1992, he released his first album.

== Albums ==
- Bir Umut, (1992)
- En Güzel Serüven, (1994)
- Yaşıyorum, (1995)
- Yalvarma (Maxi Single), (1996)
- Herşey Yolunda, (1997)
- Sen Mutlu Ol (Maxi Single), (1998)
- Şarkılar Var, (1999)
- Kusursuz Aşk, (2001)
- Remix, (2002)
- Aşkla Oldu – Best Of Soner Arıca, (2003)
- Hatıram Olsun, (2004)
- Benim Adım Aşk, (2005)
- Dance Remix, (2006)
- Bu Yaz Biz, (2006)
- Seni Seviyorum, (2007)
- İyisi Geliyor, (2014)
- Yapboz, (2015)
- Saklı, (2016)
