= Nil Kıyısında =

Studio album by Nil Karaibrahimgil
- Released: 19 February 2009
- Genre: Pop
- Label: Sony BMG
- Producer: Alper Erinç

Nil Karaibrahimgil chronology
Tek Taşımı Kendim Aldım (2006)	Nil Kıyısında (2009)	Ben Buraya Çıplak Geldim (2012)

Nil Kıyısında (English: Inshore the Nile) is Turkish pop music singer Nil Karaibrahimgil's fourth studio album, released in 2009. The first track, "Seviyorum Sevmiyorum" was sent to radio in January 2009. The music video for the song was shot by Umur Turagay, and the song peaked #1 at Billboard Turkey list. "İlla" features famous Turkish singer Mazhar Alanson from "MFÖ".

The working title for the album was "The River Nile". Unlike her previous records, she didn't work with Ozan Çolakoğlu. Instead, she worked with Alper Erinç, who was best known with his works made with Turkish singer Göksel.

== Track listing ==
#	Title	English translation	Time
1	"Seviyorum Sevmiyorum"	I love, I don't love	3:32
2	"Çok Canım Acıyo"	I hurt a lot	3:20
3	"Yalnızlardanım"	I'm from loners	3:43
4	"Ne Garip Adam"	What an odd man	3:43
5	"İlla"	In any case	3:40
6	"Eminim Sevmediğine"	I'm sure (he) didn't love	3:42
7	"Duma Duma Dum"		3:58
8	"Kırık"	Broken	5:03
9	"Aşkımız Her Zamanki Gibi Tehlikede"	Our love is in danger as always	3:14
10	"Yalnız Kalpler de Atarlar"	Lonely hearts beat too	2:58

- All songs written by Nil Karaibrahimgil, except "Seviyorum Sevmiyorum" and "Kırık" are cowritten with Alper Erinç.

== Personnel ==
- Nil Karaibrahimgil: Main Vocal
- Alper Erinç: Acoustic and electric guitars, mandolin on track 10
- Yıldıran Güz: Lute on tracks 2 and 4
- Rafet Alık: Zither on track 2
- Alp Ersönmez: Bass on all tracks except 9
- İzzet Kızıl: Percussion
- Veysel Samanlıoğlu: Violin and various strings
- Atilla Kiviv, Kadir Okyay, Muhittin Darıcı, Sendur Güzelel: Strings on tracks 1–4, 6, 8 and 9

== Production ==
- All songs arranged by Alper Erinç, except track 9 (arranged by Hakan Özer)
- Produced by Alper Erinç
- Recorded by Alper Gemici
- Mixed by Michael Zimmerling
- Mastered by Stuart Hawkes

== Music videos ==
- Seviyorum Sevmiyorum
- Duma Duma Dum
- Kırık
