= Kayahan =

Turkish pop music singer-songwriter (1949-2015)

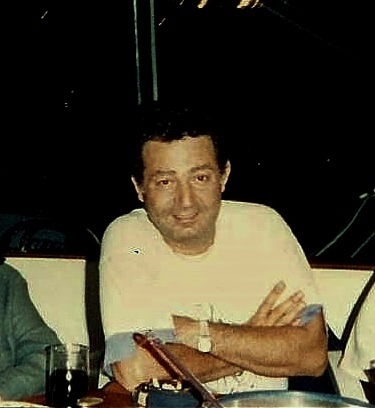
- Kayahan in his yacht at Bodrum in 1997

Background information
- Born: Kayahan Açar; 29 March 1949; İzmir, Turkey
- Died: 3 April 2015 (aged 66) Istanbul, Turkey
- Genres: Pop, Pop-Rock, Spoken word, Ethnic, Folk, Indie
- Occupations: Guitarist, singer-songwriter, record producer
- Instrument: Guitar
- Years active: 1975–2015
- Website: kayahan.info

Kayahan Açar (29 March 1949 – 3 April 2015) was a Turkish pop music singer-songwriter. He was an accomplished composer, consistently ranking among the best-selling Turkish musicians of all time. Kayahan composed all of his own material and released more than eight best-selling albums during a career spanning three decades. Kayahan released a number of compact cassettes, CDs and albums and had major singles. He represented Turkey in Eurovision Song Contest 1990 with "Gözlerinin Hapsindeyim".

== Early years ==
Kayahan Açar was born in İzmir, Turkey on 29 March 1949. He spent his childhood and young adulthood years in Ankara before moving to Istanbul.

== Career ==
He became known for his songs "Geceler" ("Nights"), "Kar Taneleri" ("Snow Flakes"), "Esmer Günler" ("Brunette Days"), which were sung by Nilüfer, all becoming later classical.

His album Yemin Ettim (I Swore), released on 3 June 1991, became a bestseller. He coined a motto "Yolu sevgiden geçen herkesle bir gün bir yerde buluşuruz" (One day, we will meet everyone somewhere, whose path goes through love". He wrote and composed also songs for children, and appeared in television shows for children.

On 30 April 1992, he released the album Odalarda Işıksızım (Lightless in the Rooms). Ten songs of Kayahan in the album titled Son Şarkılarım (My Last Songs), released by the label Raks Müzik in March 1993, became very successful. He continued his career with the albums Benim Penceremden (From My Window), released in January 1995. The song "Allah'ım Neydi Günahım" ("God, What Was My Sin?") has been sung by many singers, and brought him great success. With this album, he introduced to the music world a new, young and talented singer, İpek Tüter, whom he married later in 1999.

Kayahan's 1996 album, Canımın Yaprakları (Leaves of My Life) had eight songs and expressed "Allah kimseyi sevgisiz bırakmasın" (May God not leave anyone without love), emphasizing the concept "love" with "Sevgisiz hiçbir şey yapılmaz. Herşeyin başı sevgidir" (Nothing can be done without love. The beginning of everything is love). The next year, he released the album Emrin Olur (Your Call). His ninth album Beni Azad Et (Set Me Free) came out in April 1999, and featured nine songs, some of them becoming hits. Among them was a song, "Gömeç", the name of a seaside resort in Balıkesir Province, where he has a residence with a special music studio and where he spent most of his summer time. The album Gönül Sayfam (My Soul's Page), released 26 November 2000, containing the songs "17 Ağustos" (17 August) commemorating the earthquake of 17 August 1999 and "Ninni" (Lullaby) for his new-born daughter Aslı Gönül. In Ne Oldu Can (What Happened Dear), released 17 December 2002, Kayahan emphasized the importance of the musicians and artists with his song "Bugün Aslında Bayram" (Today Is Indeed, Feastday), he wrote in memory of the late singer-songwriter Barış Manço.

Kayahan received his first important award "Altın Portakal" (Golden Orange) with the song "Geceler" (Nights) at the 1986 International Mediterranean Music Contest. He represented Turkey at the Eurovision Song Contest 1990 with his song "Gözlerinin Hapsindeyim" (I'm captive in your eyes), which came 17th. In 2003, he was honored with the Altın Kelebek (Golden Butterfly), and the MÜYAP (Music Producers Association) award for the bestselling-success of the album Ne Oldu Can. He released Kelebeğin Şansı (The Luck of the Butterfly) in 2005, and Biriciğime (To My One and Only) on 15 March 2007. He performed many concerts in Turkey and abroad. For his open-air concert held at Kızılay Square in Ankara on the occasion of the Republic Day in 1992, a crowd of about 160,000 people came together. Kayahan performed many relief benefit concerts to create or increase awareness about the environment.

== Personal life ==
Açar was married three times. He made his first marriage to Nur in 1973. From this marriage, which lasted 18 years long, he became father of a daughter Beste (Turkish for music composition), born in 1975. Beste was runner-up for Miss Turkey in 1995. Kayahan remarried to Lale Yılmaz in 1992. The couple divorced in 1993. In 1999, at age fifty, he remarried to his third and current wife 1976-born İpek Tüter. In August 2000, İpek gave birth to their daughter Aslı Gönül.

== Illness and death ==
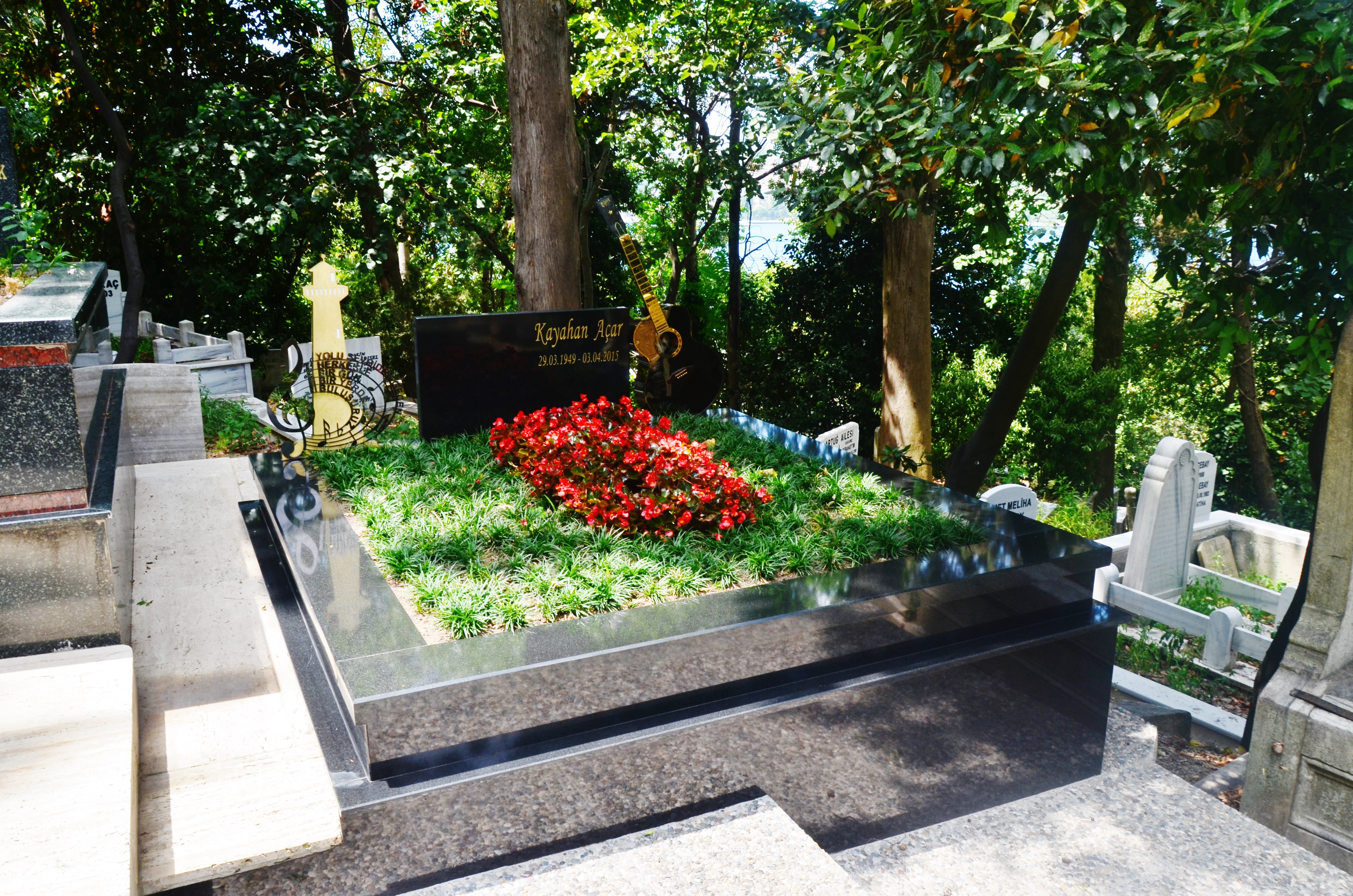
The grave of Kayahan Açar at Kanlıca Cemetery in Kanlıca, Istanbul.

In 1990, Kayahan was diagnosed with soft-tissue cancer. He caught the same disease in 2005 again. The illness repeated in 2014, and he was under treatment for cancer.

Kayahan died of multiple organ dysfunction syndrome on 3 April 2015, aged 66, in a hospital in Istanbul. He had been battling small-cell lung cancer since one-and-half years. He had overcome the disease twice before. After a Valentine's Day concert he lately performed with Nilüfer on 14 February 2015, he bid a public farewell to his fans.

He was buried in Kanlıca Cemetery, which overlooks Bosphorus, following a memorial ceremony in Cemal Reşit Rey Concert Hall, and the religious funeral service at Teşvikiye Mosque, attended also by President Recep Tayyip Erdoğan and a great number of renowned musicians. He was survived by his wife İpek Açar, and daughters Aslı Gönül and Beste.

== Tribute ==
Turkish musicians contributed to and sang for a tribute album, Kayahan'ın En İyileri No.1 to celebrate his music and legacy. Of the popular Turkish artists, taking part were Tarkan, Sezen Aksu, Sıla, Nilüfer, Gülşen, Ajda Pekkan, Mustafa Ceceli, Emre Aydın among several others.

== Albums ==
- 1975 – Bekle Gülüm – Ateş (Wait, My Rose – Fire!)
- 1978 – İstanbul Hatırası – Neden Olmasın (A Souvenir from Istanbul – Why Not?)
- 1981 – Canım Sıkılıyor Canım (I Get Bored)
- 1987 – Merhaba Çocuklar (Hello Kids)
- 1988 – Benim Şarkılarım (My Songs)
- 1989 – Benim Şarkılarım 2 (Siyah Işıklar) (My Songs Vol. 2: Black Lights)
- 1991 – Yemin Ettim (I Swore)
- 1992 – Odalarda Işıksızım (Lightless in the Rooms)
- 1993 – Son Şarkılarım (My Last Songs)
- 1995 – Benim Penceremden (From My Window)
- 1996 – Canımın Yaprakları (Leaves of My Life)
- 1997 – Emrin Olur (Your Call)
- 1999 – Beni Azad Et (Set Me Free)
- 2000 – Gönül Sayfam (My Soul's Page)
- 2002 – Ne Oldu Can? (What Happened? My Dear)
- 2004 – Kelebeğin Şansı (The Luck of the Butterfly)
- 2007 – Biriciğime (To My One and Only)
- 2011 – 365 Gün (365 Days)

== See also ==
- List of Turkish musicians
- Turkish music

Awards and achievements
Preceded by Pan with "Bana Bana"	Turkey in the Eurovision Song Contest; 1990	Succeeded by İzel, Reyhan Karaca & Can Uğurluer with "İki Dakika"
