= Nil Karaibrahimgil =

Turkish singer and songwriter

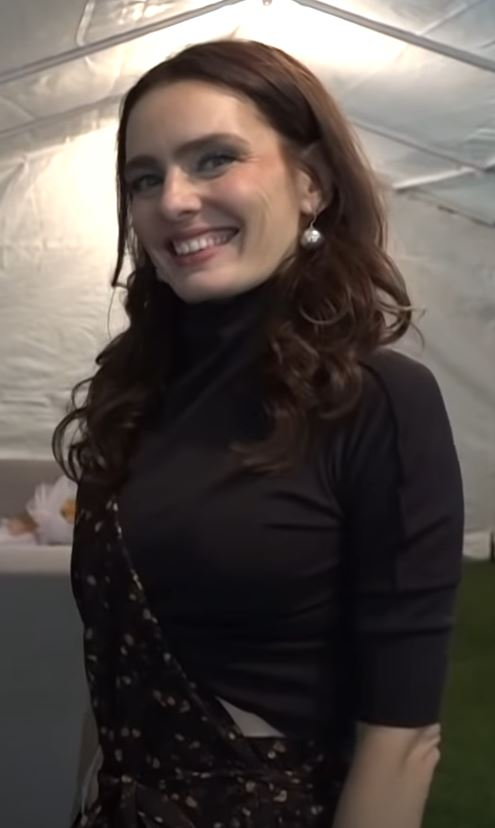
- Karaibrahimgil in 2019
- Born: Ferhan Nil Karaibrahimgil; 17 October 1976 (age 49); Ankara, Turkey
- Occupations: Singer, songwriter
- Spouse: Serdar Erener (m. 2010)
- Children: 1
- Relatives: Selami Karaibrahimgil (uncle) Sertab Erener (sister-in-law)
- Musical career
- Genres: Pop rock, alternative rock, dance-pop
- Years active: 1998–present
- Label: Sony Music
- Website: http://www.nilkaraibrahimgil.com

Ferhan Nil Karaibrahimgil (born 17 October 1976) is a Turkish singer and songwriter, mostly noted for her distinct lyrics.

== Biography ==
Nil's passion and admiration for music stems from her father Suavi Karaibrahimgil, who is also a musician although he is not active in the Turkish music industry, and her uncle Selami Karaibrahimgil, who was a singer. In 2000, Karaibrahimgil graduated from Boğaziçi University with a degree in political science and international relations. She also further received the Crystal Apple prize award twice, which recognized her achievements in advertising. Besides academic success, Nil has found fortune in the Turkish music scene. Many of her songs deal with women, freedom, life, love, marriage and relationships. Her articles have been published weekly in Hürriyet, a daily Turkish newspaper, since 2004. On 21 January 2010, she married Sertab Erener's brother Serdar Erener near the shore of the Nile River. She has a son named Aziz Arif, born in May 2014.

== Discography ==
=== Albums ===
| Year | Album |
|---|---|
| 2002 | Nil Dünyası: Date: 8 May 2002; Format: MC, CD, digital download |
| 2004 | Nil FM: Date: 16 January 2004; Format: MC, CD, digital download |
| 2006 | Tek Taşımı Kendim Aldım: Date: 11 May 2006; Format: MC, CD, digital download |
| 2009 | Nil Kıyısında: Date: 19 February 2009; Format: CD, digital download |
| 2012 | Ben Buraya Çıplak Geldim: Date: 5 July 2012; Format: CD, digital download |
| 2019 | Nil'den İyi Gelen Sesler: Date: 28 October 2019; Format: Digital download |

=== Non-album singles ===
- "Hakkında Her Şeyi Duymak İstiyorum" (2011)
- "Kanatlarım Var Ruhumda" (2014)
- "Gençliğime Sevgilerle" (2016)
- "Bizi Anlatsam" (2016)
- "Niltemenni" (2016)
- "Benden Sana" (2017)
- "Annelere Ninni" (2017)
- "Vah ki Ne Vah" (2017)
- "İyi ki" (2018)
- "Sakız Adası" (2020)
- "Özlüyorum" (2020)
- "Daha Fazla Sen" (2020)
- "Hep Yanımda Kal" (2021)
- "Diskotek" (2021)
- "Hikayenin Peşini Bırakma" (2021)
- "Uyan Anne" (2021)
- "Boy" (2022)
- "Seni Bir Daha Görmezsem Olmaz" (2023)

=== Charts ===
| Year | Title | Turkish Airplay Chart |
| 2007 | "Bu Mudur?" (Note: "It this it [love]?/Is that all [that love is]?", conveys both the excitement at the prospect of love and the complement/inverse of the surplus in "XL": a love too small or too lacking.) | 1 |

=== Guest appearances ===
| Year | Song | Album |
|---|---|---|
| 2001 | "Masal" | Commissar Shakespeare soundtrack |
| 2002 | "Girl" | Harikalar Diyarı (Wonderland) by Ilhan Erşahin |
| 2005 | "Organize İşler Bunlar" | Magic Carpet Ride soundtrack |
| 2006 | "Yaş 18" | The Exam soundtrack |
| 2007 | "Hoppala" | Istanbul by Wax Poetic |
| 2008 | "İstanbul'da Sonbahar" | Söz Müzik Teoman |
| 2014 | "Kanatlarım Var Ruhumda" | Bi Küçük Eylül Meselesi soundtrack |
| 2014 | "Hadi İnşallah" | Hadi İnşallah soundtrack |
| 2016 | "Gel Aşka Gel" | Kocan Kadar Konuş: Diriliş Soundtrack |
| 2016 | "Bizi Anlatsam" | Hesapta Aşk soundtrack |
| 2017 | "Asuman" | Mirkelam Şarkıları |
| 2018 | "Göreceksin Kendini" | Şarkı Gibi Şarkılar |
| 2018 | "Burası İstanbul" | Money Trap soundtrack |
| 2019 | "Canım Benim" | Altın Düetler 2 |

== Filmography ==
Cinema
| Year | Title | Role | Notes |
|---|---|---|---|
| 2008 | A.R.O.G | Mimi | |

Television
| Year | Title | Role | Notes |
|---|---|---|---|
| 2007 | Avrupa Yakası | Herself | episode 126 |
| 2012 | Yalan Dünya | Herself | episodes 11 and 23 |
| 2016 | Müdür Ne'aptın? | Herself | episode 5 |
| 2018 | Jet Sosyete | Herself | episode 15 |

== Books ==
- Nil'in Kelebekleri (Butterflies of the Nile), 320p, 2011, Doğan Kitap, ISBN 978-605-111-982-3
- Kelebeğin Hayat Sırları (Life Secrets of the Butterfly), 296p, 2015, Doğan Novus, ISBN 978-605-092-856-3
- Nil'e Hayat Dersleri, 2018, Doğan Novus, ISBN 9786050950915
- İyi Gelen Yazılar, 2019, Doğan Novus, ISBN 9786050966077
- Kanatların Var Ruhunda, 2024, Doğan Novus, ISBN 9786258004892
