= Demet Sağıroğlu =

Turkish singer

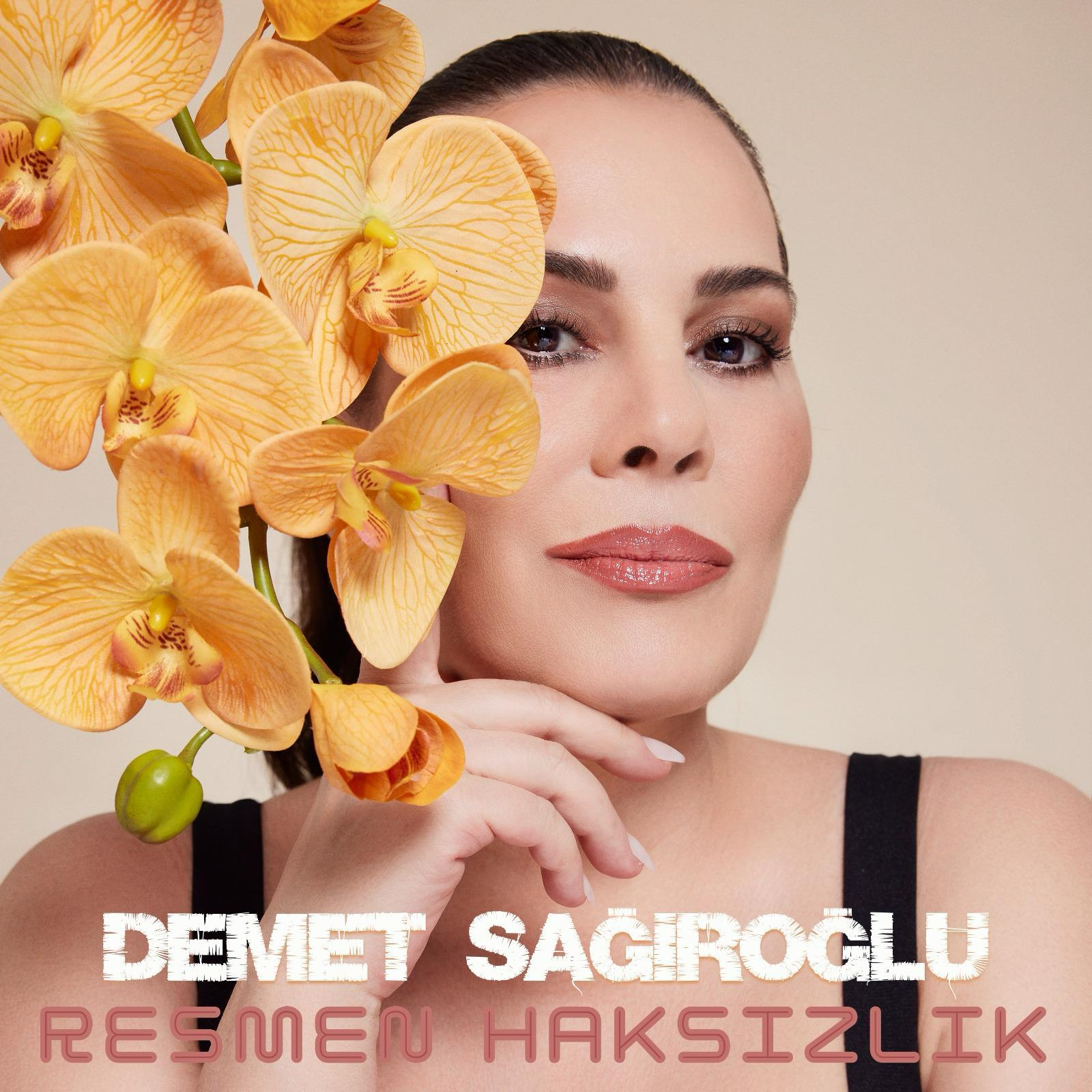

Background information
- Born: Rabia Demet Sağıroğlu; 5 December 1966 (age 59); Erzurum, Turkey
- Genres: Pop
- Years active: 1989–present
- Labels: Sony (1994–2000); Raks (2000–2004); Topkapı (2004–2009); Ossi (2009–present)
- Website: Official website

Demet Sağıroğlu (born 5 December 1966) is a Turkish pop music singer.

In 1989, she was part of the backing vocals group with Kayahan who bid to represent Turkey in 1989 Eurovision Song Contest with the song "Ve Melankoli" coming close second to Grup Pan who won with "Bana Bana". In 1990 she tried again with Kayahan with the song "Gözlerinin Hapsindeyim" for 1990 Eurovision Song Contest and winning the bid went on to accompany Kayahan to Zagreb where the Turkish entry finished 17th.

Starting mid-1990s, she developed a successful solo career with a number of albums.

== Discography ==
=== Albums ===
- 1994: Kınalı Bebek
- 1996: Şikayetim Var
- 1998: Sımsıcak
- 2000: Papatya Falları
- 2004: Korkum Yok
- 2012: Hiç Özlemedin Mi?

=== Singles ===
(Selective)

- 1994: "Arnavut Kaldırımı" / "Kınalı Bebek" / "Bu Saatten Sonra" / "Hazan Mevsimi" / "Benden Vazgeçme" / Gönlünce Yaşa / "Biçare" / "Yağızım"
- 1996: "Aşk Perisi" / "Şikayetim Var" / "Zar Attık" / "İhanet Ettin" / "Söylemem" / "Sana Kaldı"
- 1998: "Bir Vurgun Bu Sevda" / "Allah Görür" / "Yarın Olmaz" / "Haydi Gülümse" / "Arada Derede" / "Aynı Gece"
- 2000: "Papatya Falları" / "Savruldum" / "Sus Söyleme" / "Acılar Sürekli Olamaz" / "Ben Anneme Çekmişim" / "İki Yüzlüm"
- 2004: "Korkum Yok" / "Herşeyim" / "Yar Diye Diye" / "Bye-bye Sevgilim"
- 2009: "Silkelen!" / "Gittiğim Yol"
