= Tek Taşımı Kendim Aldım =

Studio album by Nil Karaibrahimgil
- Released: 11 May 2006
- Genre: Pop rock, rock, alternative, dance
- Length: 42:18
- Label: Epic
- Producer: Ozan Çolakoğlu

Nil Karaibrahimgil chronology
Nil FM (2004)	Tek Taşımı Kendim Aldım (2006)	Nil Kıyısında (2009)

Tek Taşımı Kendim Aldım (English: I Bought My Diamond Myself) is the 2006 album of Nil Karaibrahimgil, a female Turkish music singer-songwriter.

== Track listing ==
#	Title	English translation	Time
1	"Pırlanta"	Diamond	3:41
2	"Kamikaze"	Kamikaze	3:28
3	"Siz"	You	3:08
4	"Bu mudur?"	Is this [love]?	3:28
5	"Sarhoş"	Drunk	3:29
6	"Neyin Var Bugün?"	What is wrong with you today?	3:13
7	"Peri featuring Ayben"	Fairy featuring Ayben	3:28
8	"Bambaşka"	Totally different	3:45
9	"Parçalı Bulutlu"	Partly cloudy	4:28
10	"Organize İşler Bunlar"	These are organised businesses	3:11
11	"Bu mudur Akustik"		3:08
12	"Pırlanta Ozinga Remix"		3:56

- All songs written by: Nil Karaibrahimgil (except "Bu mudur?" is co-written with Ozan Çolakoğlu)
