= Funda Arar =

Turkish singer (born 1975)

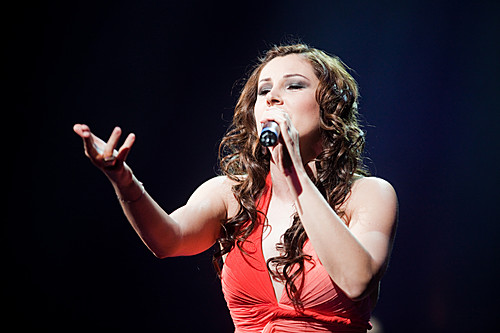
- Arar in 2009
- Born: 8 April 1975 (age 50); Ankara, Turkey
- Occupation: Musician
- Spouse: Febyo Taşel (m. 2004)
- Children: 1
- Musical career
- Genres: Anatolian rock; pop; classical Turkish
- Instruments: Vocals; oud; mandolin
- Years active: 1999–present
- Labels: Emre Grafson; DMC; TMC
- Website: fundaarar.com

Funda Arar (Turkish pronunciation: [funˈda aˈɾaɾ]; born 8 April 1975) is a Turkish singer.

Funda Arar spent her early childhood in Ankara, where she was born, and later in Muğla and Adapazarı. She studied at Istanbul Technical University's music conservatory, specialicizing in the mandolin. Her first album Sevgilerde came out in 1999, became a big hit, especially the song "Aysel". Sevgiliye was released a year later and included hits like "Seni Düşünürüm" and "Cesminaz" in collaboration with Kıraç. Alagül and Sevda Yanığı, her third and fourth albums came out in 2002 and 2003, which had the songs "Haberin Var mı?", "Aşksız Kal".

Arar's album Son Dans was released in December 2005 following a long break. Recently, she released the much anticipated Rüya (2008) (Turkish classical music), in which she sang songs in a variety of makams such as Hicaz, Rast, Hüzzam, Muhayyerkürdî, Uşşak, Kürdîlihicazkâr, and Nihavend. In this album, she was accompanied by a master ensemble of (Turkish classical music) under the directorship of Yaşar Okyay.

She is married with Febyo Taşel since 2004 who is also producer of all of her albums. In 2013, they had a child named Aras.

== Discography ==
=== Studio albums ===
- 2000: Sevgilerde
- 2002: Alagül
- 2003: Sevda Yanığı
- 2006: Son Dans (Mü-Yap certification: Platinum)
- 2008: Rüya
- 2009: Zamanın Eli
- 2011: Aşkın Masum Çocukları
- 2012: Sessiz Sinema
- 2015: Hoşgeldin
- 2017: Aşk Hikayesi
- 2018: Arabesk

=== EPs ===
- 2001: Sevgiliye (with Kıraç)
- 2007: Beyaz Gelincik (with Kıraç)
- 2020: Doldur Yüreğimi
- 2022: Boşver

=== Charts ===
List of singles, release date and album name
Single	Year	Peak	Album
Single	Year	TR	Album
"Karartma Günleri"	2006	5	Son Dans
"Benim İçin Üzülme"	2006	4	Son Dans
"Camdan Kalp"	2006	—	Son Dans
"Karaya Vuran Gemiler Gibi"	2007	—	Son Dans
"Bu Sabah Güneş Doğmuyor"	2007	2	Son Dans
"Beni Benle Böyle"	2008	—	Son Dans
"Senden Öğrendim"	2009	3	Zamanın Eli
"Yak Gel"	2009	2	Zamanın Eli
"Geçmez Yara"	2009	3	Zamanın Eli
"Geceler"	2010	13	Zamanın Eli
"Sen ve Ben"	2011	1	Aşkın Masum Çocukları
"İkimiz"	2011	—	Aşkın Masum Çocukları
"Aşkın Bana Değdi Değeli"	2011	—	Aşkın Masum Çocukları
"Anmam Adını"	2011	—	Aşkın Masum Çocukları
"Sessiz Sinema"	2012	—	Sessiz Sinema
"Yok Yok"	2012	—	Sessiz Sinema
"Geciken Gözyaşı"	2012	—	Sessiz Sinema
"Yoksun"	2013	—	Sessiz Sinema
"Pişmanım"	2013		Sessiz Sinema
"Hafıza" (feat. Enbe Orkestrası)	2013	1	Hafıza
"Hayatın Hesabı"	2015	—	Hoşgeldin
"Yediverenim"	2015	—	Hoşgeldin
"Bağışla"	2015	2	Bağışla
"Gamsız"	2015	—	Hoşgeldin
"—" indicates that the songs were not included in the lists or the results were not disclosed.

== Filmography ==
Year	Film	Role	Notes
2000	Ruhsar	Herself	Guest appearance
2008	Komedi Dükkanı	Herself	Guest appearance
2009	Altın Kızlar	Herself	Guest appearance
2016	Kaçma Birader	Herself	Film

== Television programs ==
- Funda Arar'la Performans (2005)
- Gölgeler (2006)
- Söz Müzik Funda Arar (2008–2009)
