= Mirkelam =

Turkish singer (born 1966)

Fergan Mirkelam (born 20 May 1966, Istanbul) is a Turkish singer. He first became known with his song "Her Gece" ("Every Night") in 1995.

== Albums ==
- Mirkelam (31 May 1995)
- Joker (1998)
- Unutulmaz (2001)
- Kalbimde Parmak İzin Var (2004)
- Mutlu Olmak İstiyorum (2006)
- RRDP (Rakın Rol Disko Parti) - with Kargo (Sony Music 2010)
- Denizin Arka Yüzü (2013)
- Mirkelam Şarkıları (2017, tribute album)
