= Hande Yener discography =

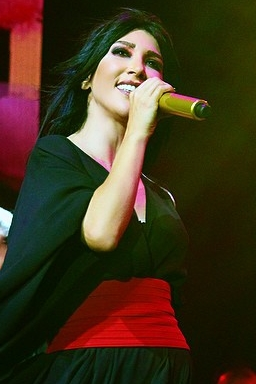
- Yener performing at the Cemil Topuzlu Open-Air Theatre in 2014
- Studio albums: 15
- EPs: 2
- Compilation albums: 7
- Singles: 17

Turkish singer Hande Yener's discography consists of fifteen studio albums, one split album, five compilation albums, two extended plays (EP) and thirteen singles. In the early 1990s, she met Sezen Aksu and started working as her backing vocalist. She made her debut in 2000, with her first studio album Senden İbaret, which was released by DMC. Two years later, her second studio album, Sen Yoluna... Ben Yoluma..., was released by Erol Köse Production. The album sold one million copies in the year it was released and received a platinum certification from MÜ-YAP. In 2004, her third studio album, Aşk Kadın Ruhundan Anlamıyor, sold 412,000 copies, and in 2006 her fourth studio album, Apayrı, sold 165,000 copies, both of which received gold certifications.

In 2007, her first electronic music album, Nasıl Delirdim?, was released. She also wrote many of the songs in the album. With her 2008 album Hipnoz and 2009 album Hayrola?, she continued making electronic music. With her eighth studio album Hande'ye Neler Oluyor?, which was released in April 2010, she returned to making pop music. The song "Bodrum" from this album topped the music charts in Turkey. Yener was the featured artist on the song "Atma" from Sinan Akçıl's first studio album Kalp Sesi, which was released in April 2011. In September 2011, she released her ninth studio album Teşekkürler; followed by a split album with pop rock group Seksendört, titled Rüya, which was released in June 2012. In December 2012, her tenth studio album Kraliçe was released. Its lead single, "Hasta", ranked second on Turkey's music charts and topped many radio playlists.

In 2013, Yener released two songs written and composed by Berksan: "Ya Ya Ya Ya" and "Biri Var". In April 2014, "Alt Dudak" was published as a promotional single from her eleventh studio album Mükemmel, which was released in June 2014. The second single from this album was "Naber", for which the footage of Yener's concert at the Harbiye Cemil Topuzlu Open-Air Theatre were used to make a music video for the song. In September 2014, Yener was featured on Berksan's single "Haberi Var mı?".

In 2015, Yener was among the artists whose names were included in Volga Tamöz's second studio album, No. 2, which was released in March. The two made the album's lead single "Sebastian". In July, her new single "Kışkışşş" was released. In August, a music video for the song "Hani Bana" was released, for which she again used the footage of her concert at the Harbiye Cemil Topuzlu Open-Air Theatre. In December, she released her first duet with Serdar Ortaç, titled "İki Deli".

== Albums ==
=== Studio albums ===
List of albums, sales figures and certifications
Album	Album info	Certifications	Sales
Senden İbaret	Released: 31 May 2000 (TR); Label: DMC; Format: CD, cassette, digital download		750,000
Sen Yoluna... Ben Yoluma...	Released: 22 August 2002 (TR); Label: Erol Köse; Format: CD, cassette, digital download	MÜ-YAP: Platinum	1,500,060
Aşk Kadın Ruhundan Anlamıyor	Released: 6 July 2004 (TR); Label: Erol Köse; Format: CD, cassette, digital download	MÜ-YAP: Gold	412,000
Apayrı	Released: 6 January 2006 (TR); Label: Erol Köse; Format: CD, cassette, digital download	MÜ-YAP: Gold	165,000
Nasıl Delirdim?	Released: 15 May 2007 (TR); Label: Erol Köse; Format: CD, cassette, digital download		210,000
Hipnoz	Released: 27 May 2008 (TR); Label: Erol Köse; Format: CD, cassette, digital download		50,000
Hayrola?	Released: 31 March 2009 (TR); Label: Avrupa; Format: CD, cassette, digital download		68,000
Hande'ye Neler Oluyor?	Released: 1 April 2010 (TR); Label: Poll; Format: CD, cassette, digital download		100,000
Teşekkürler	Released: 20 September 2011 (TR); Label: Poll; Format: CD, digital download		60,906
Kraliçe	Released: 12 December 2012 (TR); Label: Poll; Format: CD, digital download		80,997
Mükemmel	Released: 2 June 2014 (TR); Label: Poll; Format: CD, digital download		60,048
Hepsi Hit Vol. 1	Released: 6 June 2016 (TR); Label: Poll; Format: CD, digital download		
Hepsi Hit Vol. 2	Released: 21 June 2017 (TR); Label: Poll; Format: CD, digital download		
Carpe Diem	Released: 2 October 2020 (TR); Label: Poll; Format: CD, digital download		
Afrodizyak	Released: 23 June 2023 (TR); Label: Poll; Format: CD, digital download		

=== Compilation albums ===
List of albums
Album	Album info
Hande'yle Yaz Bitmez	Released: 13 September 2010 (TR); Label: Poll; Format: CD, digital download
Hande Yener Klasikler	Released: 31 December 2012 (TR); Label: Poll; Format: Digital download
Hande Yener Yepyeniler	Released: 31 December 2012 (TR); Label: Poll; Format: Digital download
Best of Hande Yener	Released: 29 November 2013 (TR); Label: Poll; Format: Digital download
Hande Yener Best of Remixes	Released: 29 November 2013 (TR); Label: Poll; Format: Digital download
Best of Hande Yener	Released: 9 January 2014 (TR); Label: Erol Köse; Format: CD, digital download
İki Deli	Released: 4 December 2015 (TR); Label: Poll; Format: CD, digital download

=== EPs ===
List of albums
Album	Album info
Extra	Released: 29 June 2001 (TR); Label: DMC; Format: CD, cassette, digital download
Hande Maxi	Released: 8 September 2006 (TR); Label: Erol Köse; Format: CD, cassette, digital download

=== Split albums ===
List of albums
Album	Album info
Rüya (with Seksendört)	Released: 11 June 2012 (TR); Label: Poll; Format: CD, digital download

== Singles ==
=== As lead artist ===
Position of songs on different lists, year of publication and albums's names
Song	Year	Peak (TR)	Album
"1 Yerde" (duet with Kemal Doğulu)	2008	—	Non-album single
"Bana Anlat"	2011	—	Teşekkürler
"Rüya" (duet with Seksendört)	2012	—	Rüya
"Ya Ya Ya Ya"	2013	2	Non-album single
"Biri Var" (with Volga Tamöz)	2013	—	Non-album single
"Alt Dudak"	2014	2	Mükemmel
"Sebastian" (duet with Volga Tamöz)	2015	1	No. 2
"Kışkışşş"	2015	—	Non-album single
"İki Deli" (duet with Serdar Ortaç)	2015	3	İki Deli
"Bakıcaz Artık"	2017	2	Hepsi Hit Vol. 2
"Beni Sev"	2018	2	Non-album single
"Love Always Wins"	2018	—	Non-album single
"Aşk Tohumu"	2019	—	Non-album single
"Kuş"	2019	—	Non-album single
"Krema"	2019	—	Non-album single
"Pencere"	2020	—	Non-album single
"Bela"	2020	—	Non-album single
"Carpe Diem"	2020	6	Carpe Diem
"Sahte"	2021	—	Non-album single
"Aklımda"	2022	—	Non-album single
"İyi Ya"	2022	—	Non-album single
"Benden Bir Tane Daha Yok"	2023	—	Afrodizyak
"Kafandan Bunu Çıkar"	2024	—	Non-album single
"Ben Senin Delinim"	2024	—	Non-album single
"Zombi"	2024	—	Non-album single
"Damla"	2024	—	Non-album single
"Sahipsiz" (duet with Lil Zey)	2025	—	Non-album single
"Max"	2025	—	Non-album single
"Bana Ne."	2025	—	Non-album single
"180" (duet with Ozan Bayraşa)	2025	—	Non-album single
"—" indicates that the songs were not included in the lists or the results were not disclosed.

=== As featured artist ===
List of singles, year of publication and albums's names
Song	Year	Album
"Atma" (with Sinan Akçıl)	2011	Kalp Sesi
"Söndürülmez İstanbul" (with Sinan Akçıl)	2011	Kalp Sesi
"Kaderimin Oyunu"	2012	Orhan Gencebay ile Bir Ömür
"Haberi Var Mı?" (with Berksan)	2014	Haberi Var mı?
"Sebastian" (with Volga Tamöz)	2015	No. 2
"Eve Nasıl Geldim" (with Volga Tamöz and Berksan)	2015	No. 2
"Sevdan Olmasa" (with Erol Evgin)	2016	Altın Düetler
"Manzara" (with Aylin Coşkun)	2018	Sinsirella
"Kış Güneşi"	2018	Yıldız Tilbe'nin Yıldızlı Şarkıları
"Gravity" (with Faydee and Rebel Groove)	2019	Non-album single
"Aşkın Kralı" (with Yaşar Gaga)	2019	Alakasız Şarkılar, Vol. 2
"Olmazsan Olmaz" (with Tepki)	2021	Non-album single
"Yeter" (with Ceylan Ertem)	2022	Duyuyor Musun?

== Charts ==
Position of songs on different lists, year of publication and albums's names
Song	Year	Peak (TR)	Album
"Aşkın Ateşi"	2006	—	Apayrı
"Kibir (Yanmam Lazım)"	2007	2	Nasıl Delirdim?
"Romeo"	2007	2	Nasıl Delirdim?
"Hayrola?"	2009	3	Hayrola?
"Sopa"	2010	4	Hande'ye Neler Oluyor?
"Bodrum"	2010	1	Hande'ye Neler Oluyor?
"Çöp"	2010	9	Hande'ye Neler Oluyor?
"Uzaylı"	2010	3	Hande'yle Yaz Bitmez
"Unutulmuyor"	2011	—	Teşekkürler
"Hasta"	2012	2	Kraliçe
"Naber"	2014	3	Mükemmel
"Mor"	2016	1	Hepsi Hit Vol. 1
"—" indicates that the songs were not included in the lists or the results were not disclosed.

== Music videos ==
Song	Year	Singer(s)	Director	Descriptions
"Yalanın Batsın"	2000	Hande Yener	Elza Angel	
"Bunun Adı Ayrılık"	2000	Hande Yener	Hakan Yonat	
"Yoksa Mani"	2001	Hande Yener	Murad Küçük	
"Sen Yoluna... Ben Yoluma..."	2002	Hande Yener	—N/a	
"Şansın Bol Olsun"	2002	Hande Yener	—N/a	
"Evlilik Sandalı"	2003	Hande Yener	—N/a	
"Küs"	2003	Hande Yener	Nihat Odabaşı	
"Acele Etme"	2004	Hande Yener	Luca Tommassini	"Acele Etme" is the lead single from Aşk Kadın Ruhundan Anlamıyor, and the first song from the album for which a music video was released. Its shooting took place in Rome, Italy.
"Kırmızı"	2004	Hande Yener	Ömer Faruk Sorak	
"Acı Veriyor"	2004	Hande Yener	Deniz Akel	
"Armağan"	2005	Hande Yener	Luca Tommassini	
"Hoşgeldiniz"	2005	Hande Yener	Mete Özgencil	
"Bu Yüzden"	2005	Hande Yener	—N/a	
"Kelepçe"	2005	Hande Yener	Simon Henwood	"Kelepçe" is the lead single from Apayrı, and the first song from the album for which a music video was released. For the music video, Ynere worked with Simon Henwood for the first time. It was recorded in London. Yener appeared as the Red Riding Hood in the clip.
"Aşkın Ateşi"	2006	Hande Yener	Luca Tommassini	"Aşkın Ateşi" is the second song from Apayrı for which a music video was released. The clip was recorded in Italy. In 2006, the music video was chosen to represent Turkey at the OGAE Video Contest, where it ranked second among thirteen countries.
"Kim Bilebilir Aşkı"	2006	Hande Yener	Luca Tommassini	"Kim Bilebilir Aşkı" is the last song from Apayrı to get a music video. The shooting took place in Rome, at Luca Tommassi's house, and Yener appeared as a geisha in the video.
"Kim Bilebilir Aşkı (New Version)"	2006	Hande Yener	Luca Tommassini	
"Biraz Özgürlük"	2006	Hande Yener	Luca Tommassini	
"Kibir"	2007	Hande Yener	Kemal Doğulu	
"Romeo"	2007	Hande Yener	Kemal Doğulu	"Romeo" is the second song from Nasıl Delirdim? to get a music video. The song was dedicated to his then-fiancé Kadir Doğulu, and Doğulu also appeared in the video.
"1 Yerde"	2008	Kemal Doğulu and Hande Yener	Kemal Doğulu	"1 Yerde" is Kemal Doğulu's first music video as a singer. Yener appeared alongside Kemal Doğulu in the clip.
"Yalan Olmasın"	2008	Hande Yener	Kemal Doğulu	"Yalan Olmasın" is the last music video from Nasıl Delirdim?. Yener portrays an angel in the music video.
"Hipnoz"	2008	Hande Yener	Kemal Doğulu	"Hipnoz" is from the first and only music video from the album with the same name. It was shot by Kemal Doğulu at Great London Hotel. A few days after its release, some channels refused to aired it based on baseless news that it had been banned. In the following days, it was confirmed that the clip was not banned in a document published by RTÜK.
"Hayrola?"	2009	Hande Yener	Kemal Doğulu	"Hayrola?" is the first and only music video from the album with the same title. Its recording took thirty hours. Four dancers accompanied Yener in the video.
"Sopa & Yasak Aşk" + "Sopa" (Full version)	2010	Hande Yener	Kemal Doğulu	"Sopa" & "Yasak Aşk" is the first music from Hande'ye Neler Oluyor?. When Yener could not decide which song had to be made into a music video first, the two songs were combined in a single clip. The shooting lasted for a day, and Yener was chained during the shooting for two hours. After the release of the clip, the song "Sopa" was re-released with a new single clip.
"Bodrum"	2010	Hande Yener	Kemal Doğulu	"Bodrum" is the second music video from Hande'ye Neler Oluyor?. Its recording took place in Kuşadası.
"Uzaylı"	2010	Hande Yener	Kemal Doğulu	"Uzaylı" is the first and only music video from the compilation album Hande'yle Yaz Bitmez. In the video shot on the coast of Şile with İbrahim Kendirci, Yener plays a giant falling out of space.
"Çöp"	2010	Hande Yener	Kemal Doğulu	"Çöp" is the last music video from Hande'ye Neler Oluyor?. Filming took place in the coast of Silivri under the direction of Kemal Doğulu within eight hours.
"Atma"	2011	Sinan Akçıl and Hande Yener	Kemal Doğulu	"Atma" is the first music video from Sinan Akçıl's first studio album. Directed by Kemal Doğulu, its recording lasted for 16 hours and five models played in it.
"Bana Anlat"	2011	Hande Yener	Kemal Doğulu	"Bana Anlat" is the first music video from the album Teşekkürler. It was directed by Kemal Doğulu in the coast of Şile, and actor Kerem Özşeker also appeared in it.
"Unutulmuyor"	2011	Hande Yener	Şenol Korkmaz	"Unutulmuyor" is the lead single from Teşekkürler, and the second song from the album for which a music video was released. It was the first time that Yener worked with Şenol Korkmaz. The clip was recorded in Paris and preparing it took more than a month.
"Teşekkürler"	2012	Hande Yener and Sinan Akçıl	Şenol Korkmaz	
"Havaalanı"	2012	Hande Yener	—N/a	"Havaalanı" is Yener's first and only animation clip.
"Rüya"	2012	Hande Yener and Seksendört	Şenol Korkmaz	
"Dön Bana"	2012	Hande Yener	Kemal Doğulu	"Dön Bana" is the last music video from the album Teşekkürler. It was recorded in Amsterdam.
"Hasta"	2012	Hande Yener	Kemal Doğulu	The first music video to be released from the album Kraliçe. The shooting took place at Adile Sultan Palace.
"Bir Bela"	2013	Hande Yener	Kubilay Kasap	
"Ya Ya Ya Ya"	2013	Hande Yener	Hasan Kuyucu	
"Biri Var"	2013	Hande Yener and Volga Tamöz	Nihat Odabaşı	
"Alt Dudak"	2014	Hande Yener	Hasan Kuyucu	
"Naber"	2014	Hande Yener	Matina Korontzi	
"Haberi Var mı?"	2014	Hande Yener and Berksan	Bedük	
"Sebastian"	2015	Hande Yener and Volga Tamöz	Gülşen Aybaba	
"Kışkışşş"	2015	Hande Yener	Gülşen Aybaba	
"Hani Bana"	2015	Hande Yener	Burcu Aktaş	
"İki Deli"	2015	Hande Yener and Serdar Ortaç	Gülşen Aybaba	
"Mor"	2016	Hande Yener	Gülşen Aybaba	
"Deli Bile"	2016	Hande Yener	Gülşen Aybaba	
"Emrine Âmâde"	2016	Hande Yener	Ümit Ertemiz	
"Seviyorsun"	2017	Hande Yener	Gülşen Aybaba	
"Bakıcaz Artık"	2017	Hande Yener	Michael Garcia	
"Benden Sonra"	2017	Hande Yener	Michael Garcia	
"Vay"	2017	Hande Yener	Michael Garcia	
"Beni Sev"	2018	Hande Yener	Gülşen Aybaba	
"Love Always Wins"	2018	Hande Yener	Farbod Khoshtinat	
"Gravity"	2019	Faydee, Hande Yener, Rebel Groove	Gülşen Aybaba	
"Aşk Tohumu"	2019	Hande Yener	Gülşen Aybaba	
"Kuş"	2019	Hande Yener	Gülşen Aybaba	
"Krema"	2019	Hande Yener	Aytekin Yalçın	
"Pencere"	2020	Hande Yener	Aytekin Yalçın	
"Carpe Diem"	2020	Hande Yener	Aytekin Yalçın	
"Aşk Sandım"	2020	Hande Yener	Aytekin Yalçın	
"Boşuna"	2021	Hande Yener	Gülşen Aybaba	
"Kaç"	2021	Hande Yener	Aytekin Yalçın	
"Sahte"	2021	Hande Yener	Aytekin Yalçın	
"Olmazsan Olmaz"	2021	Tepki and Hande Yener	Tepki	
"Aklımda"	2022	Hande Yener	Tepki	
"İyi Ya"	2022	Hande Yener	Leo the Visualist	
"Benden Bir Tane Daha Yok"	2023	Hande Yener	Murat Joker	
"Hop Hop"	2023	Hande Yener	Tepki	
"Çatla"	2023	Hande Yener	Kerem Gülsoy	
"Ben Senin Delinim"	2024	Hande Yener	Umut Deniz	
"Zombi"	2024	Hande Yener	Mert Çalışır	
"Damla"	2024	Hande Yener	Ahmet Can Tekin	
"Sahipsiz"	2025	Hande Yener and Lil Zey	Melih Kun	
"Max"	2025	Hande Yener	Cenan Çelik	
"Bana Ne."	2025	Hande Yener	Aytekin Yalçın	
"180"	2025	Hande Yener and Ozan Bayraşa	Aytekin Yalçın	
