= 84th =

84th is the ordinal form of the number 84. 84th or Eighty-fourth may also refer to:

- A fraction, 1/84, equal to one of 84 equal parts

== Geography ==
- 84th meridian east, a line of longitude
- 84th meridian west, a line of longitude
- 84th parallel north, a circle of latitude
- 84th parallel south, a circle of latitude
- 84th Street (disambiguation)

== Military ==
- 84th Brigade (disambiguation)
- 84th Division (disambiguation)
- 84th Regiment (disambiguation)
- 84th Squadron (disambiguation)

== Other ==
- 84th century
- 84th century BC

== See also ==
- 84 (disambiguation)
