= LXXXIV Corps =

LXXXIV Corps or 84th Corps may refer to:

- LXXXIV Army Corps, Wehrmacht, Germany
- 84th Lanarkshire Rifle Volunteer Corps, United Kingdom

== See also ==
- List of military corps by number
- 84th Brigade (disambiguation)
- 84th Division (disambiguation)
- 84th Regiment (disambiguation)
- 84th (disambiguation)
