= Kraliçe =

Studio album by Hande Yener
- Released: 12 December 2012
- Recorded: 3 September–4 November 2012
- Studio: Virus Production, Istanbul, Turkey
- Genre: Pop
- Length: 43:01
- Label: Poll
- Producer: Polat Yağcı · Sinan Akçıl

Hande Yener chronology
Rüya (2012)	Kraliçe (2012)	Best of Hande Yener (2013)

Kraliçe (Queen) is the tenth studio album by Turkish singer Hande Yener. It was released on 12 December 2012 by Poll Production. It was Yener's first studio album since the 2011 release of Teşekkürler and included elements of pop music. All of the songs on the album were written by Sinan Akçıl, the third and last of Hande Yener's albums to have Akçıl as its sole songwriter. The album was produced by Polat Yağcı and Akçıl.

Kraliçe, which includes an introductory speech, eights songs and three remixes, was, in Hande Yener's opinion, an album that covered all of the music styles she had experimented with so far. The album was initially going to be titled Hasta, but after Akçıl wrote the song "Kraliçe" they decided to name the work after this song. The album's title and release date were announced on the billboards in the 2012–13 UEFA Europa League match between Fenerbahçe and AEL teams in Şükrü Saracoğlu Stadium on 8 November 2012. The album's content and photos received mixed feedback from music critics. Some compared the songs to the ones found in Yener's 2004 album Aşk Kadın Ruhundan Anlamıyor and 2006 album Apayrı, while others criticized the use of the title Kraliçe believing that it should not have been chosen by Yener for this album. The music video for the lead single "Hasta" was released on 6 December 2012 and the song ranked second on Turkey's official music chart. The album's last and final music video was made and released for "Bir Bela".

Kraliçe ranked third on D&R's list of best-selling albums in Turkey, sold 79,000 copies by the end of 2012 and received the Best Album award at the Mimar Sinan University Awards and Siyaset Dergisi Awards. The promotions for the album were interrupted due to the death of Yener's father, Erol Özyener, on 30 December 2012. Due to her father's death, Yener did not perform anywhere for two months. On 27 May 2013 Kraliçe together with the new single "Ya Ya Ya Ya" and its remixes were released as a two-disc edition under the title Kraliçe + Ya Ya Ya Ya.

== Background and release ==
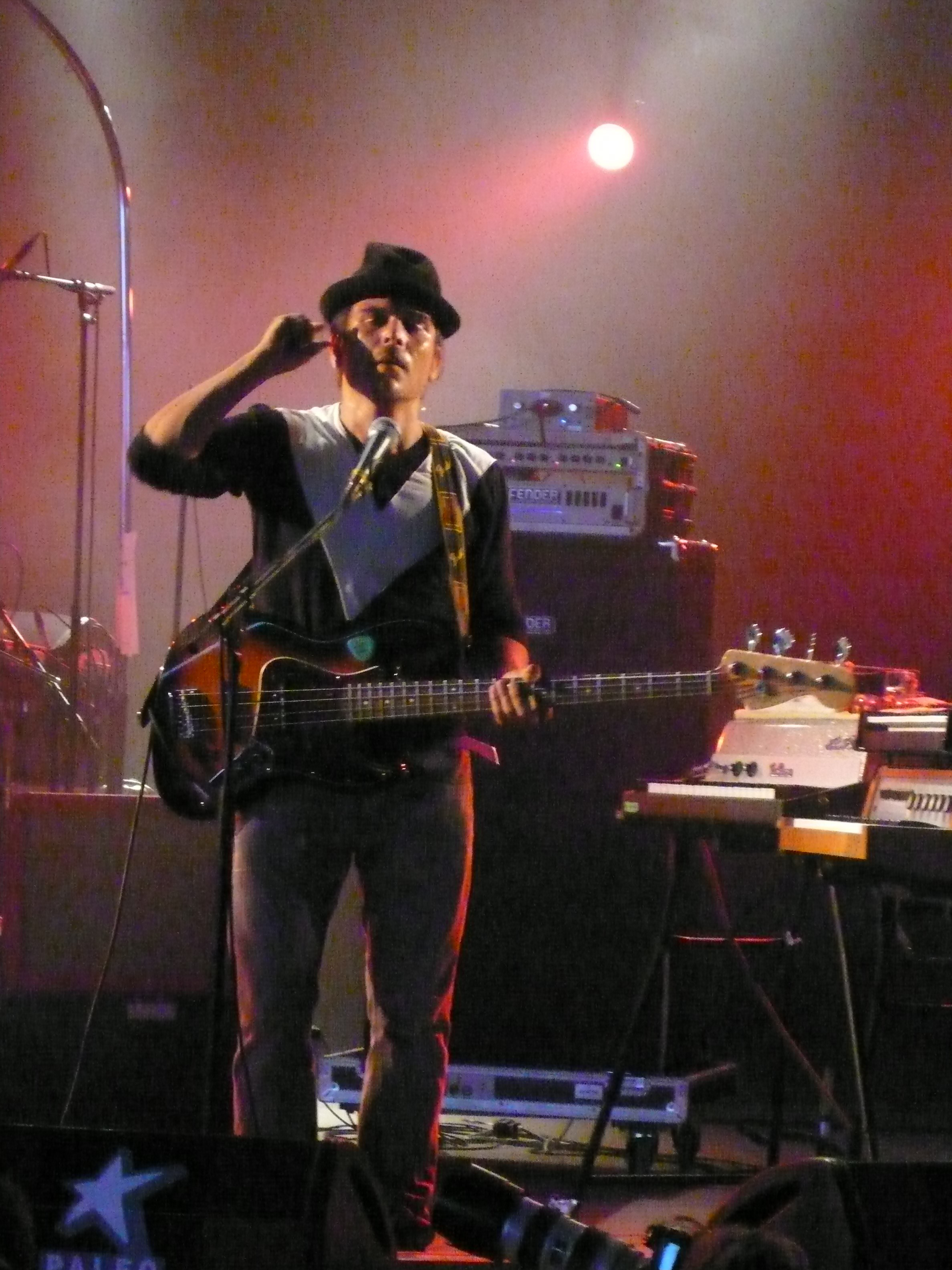
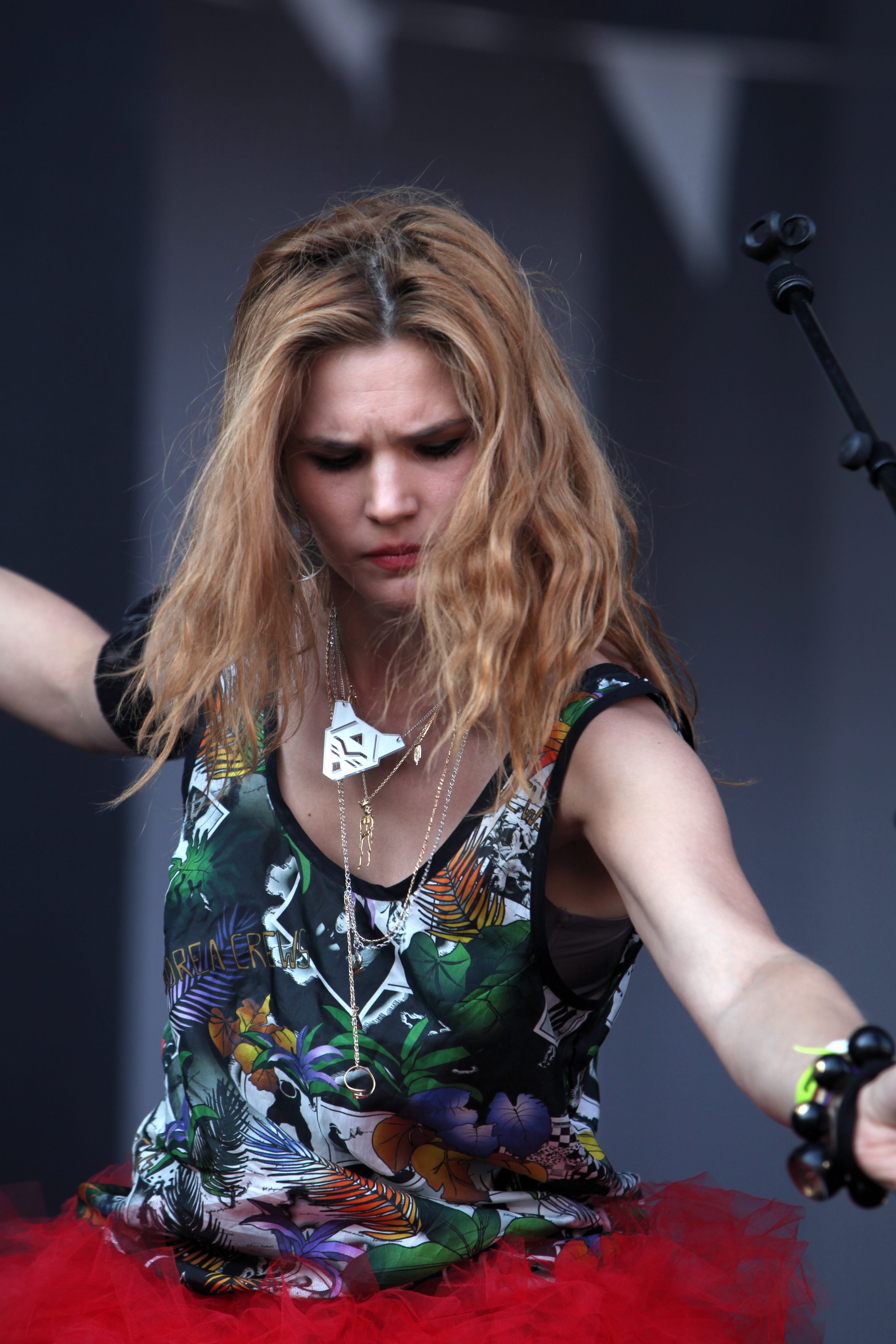
The song "Slippery Slope" (Both Ways Open Jaws, 2011), composed by The Dø members Dan Levy (left) and Olivia Merilahti (right), was turned into Turkish under the title "Tribe Gir" and included in the album.

After announcing in 2009 that she would return to making pop music, Hande Yener released the pop albums Hande'ye Neler Oluyor? and Teşekkürler in 2010 and 2011 respectively. For these two albums, she performed songs entirely written and composed by Sinan Akçıl. On 2 July 2012, Akçıl confirmed that he was working with Yener on her tenth studio album. He stated that the preparations for the album were continuing and explained the process as follows:

"When making the third album I realized that the first two albums were made during a period that we were just warming up. This is going to be a very surprising album. [...] Hande's electronic music was good but it lacked emotions. Now the album will be hot on an emotional level and the music will be good as well."

In the same month, Number One FM's music director Mert Hakan said on his Twitter account that Yener's tenth studio album would be released in the early 2013. On 30 August 2012, Yener stated that recording for her new studio album would begin on 3 September 2012. On the following days, she said the album's repertoire was over and added that the album would be full of surprises and wouldn't contain anything ordinary. On 9 October 2012, the album's lead single was recorded. On 14 October 2012, it was announced that three of the songs would be turned into music videos. On 26 October 2012, Yener explained the content of the album by saying: "There are songs and emotions in this album that I cannot even describe." On 31 October 2012, a release date was set for the album and its title was chosen. On 4 November 2012, recordings were over.

After the album's preparation process was reported occasionally by Hande Yener on Twitter, new information about the publishing process started to emerge. On 4 November 2012, producer Polat Yağcı announced the name of the album's lead single as "Hasta". The album's title, Kraliçe, announced on the billboards in the 2012–13 UEFA Europa League match between Fenerbahçe and AEL teams in Şükrü Saracoğlu Stadium on 8 November 2012. As to why the album was titled Kraliçe, Hande Yener stated that they chose this name as her fans affectionately called her by this title and explained how they settled on this title for the album:

"[The song Kraliçe] came into the album very hardly. We were asking ourselves 'Should the album be named Hasta? No, no, not Hasta, let's not go with something negative.' One day Sinan Akçıl called me. He said: 'Don't think about the album's name. You've got another song now and you'll name the album after it'. I responded: 'How can a song be titled Kraliçe'. Just for the sake of conversation, I know you're not gonna write it, but I thought how romantic it could be. The song started to ring in my head, and that day I went into a feast mood at home."

"The album's name is 'Kraliçe' but I don't want to be seen as an insincere, cold woman who sings at a palace. This album is very intimate, the songs are so romantic, and the dance songs are also fun and different. I had to do something to make the audience feel all the difference and intimacy. That's why I came up with the idea of my opening speech. I wanted to have a warm chat with the listeners."

— Hande Yener on the album's opening and intro.

On 5 December 2012, the album's photographs, taken by Kemal Doğulu, were published in the press. On 6 December, the album's lead single "Hasta" was released and a day later the album was made available for pre-ordering. On 12 December 2012, Hande Yener's tenth studio album Kraliçe was released in CD and digital formats. It was produced by Polat Yağcı and Akçıl, and contained an opening speech by Yener, eight songs and three remixes. It's a pop album and in Hande Yener's opinion its most special aspect was that it covered and included all of the music genres that she had experimented and worked with until that day. For the ninth song "Tribe Gir", the composition of the song "Slippery Slope" from the second album of the French-Finish group The Dø was used. The Turkish lyrics for the song were written by Akçıl. All of the songs on the album were written by Sinan Akçıl. Except the songs "Hasta" and "Bir Bela", which were composed by Emrah Karaduman, the songs "Görevimiz Aşk", "Kraliçe", "Bir Şey Var", "An Meselesi" and "Sana Söylüyorum" were all composed by Akçıl. Akçıl, Karaduman and Ümit Kuzer also served as the album's arrangers.

Kraliçe ranked third on D&R's list of best-selling albums on the week after its release. On the last of week of December 2012, it went down to number 4 on the list, and in January 2013 it ranked fifth on the list. It sold 60,000 copies on its first week of release and, according to MÜ-YAP, this number rose to 79,997 by the end of 2012. It won the Best Album award at the Mimar Sinan University Awards, and received the Album of the Year award at the Siyaset Dergisi Awards. It was also nominated for the Best Album award at the Pal FM Awards but lost it to Demet Akalın's Giderli 16 (2012). To promote the album, Yener started to appear on various television and radio programs but after her father Erol Özyener's death on 30 December 2012 she cut off all the promotions and did not have any performances for two months. In March 2013, it was learned that Yener and Sinan Akçıl were at odds and would not work on the same project again. As a result, Kraliçe became the last album on which the two worked with each other.

== Critical reception ==
Kraliçe received negative reviews from music critics. Aside from the album's content, the use of the name Kraliçe as the work's main title was criticized. Radikal's Sarp Dakni wrote that he could not find any queens in this album, and added that after releasing "excellent" albums between 2000-2007, Yener had now destroyed his last hopes for her with the release of this album. He believed that the album's lead single "Hasta" together with the song "Kraliçe" were attempts to resemble the pieces in Aşk Kadın Ruhundan Anlamıyor (2004). He also added that "Bir Bela", "Bir Şey Var" and "An Meselesi" were not "memorable" songs. Hürriyet's Sadi Tirak believed that Hande Yener was still able to make Turkish pop music with high quality, similar to the works published in the 1990s, but added that Yener had "realized that she needed to make a revolutionary move on her way and returned to making Turkish pop, but since then she has not stopped producing fabricated swampy works". He added that the songs "Hasta" and "An Meselesi" were the only two good pieces in the album. Onur Baştürk from the same newspaper praised the lead single "Hasta", adding that it was inspired by the pop hits of the 1990s, but he added that the album's photographs were not created with thought. Hürriyet's Hikmet Demirkol believed that Hande Yener's latest albums were not worthy successors to Apayrı (2006) and hoped that she would release an album like that in the future. Milliyet Sanat's music critic Yavuz Hakan Tok criticized the album on his weblog, but viewed "Hasta" as a worthy hit and an exception between all of the songs in Kraliçe. He also added that the album was not different from any of Hande Yene's recent works and that the title 'queen' could only be used for Sezen Aksu. He also noted that Yener had started to perform pieces that were similar to the syllabic songs found in Sinan Akçıl's own album. He believed that the lyrics for "Tribe Gir" were written under inspiration from "Aşkın Ateşi" (Apayrı, 2006) and wrote that with this album Yener had continued to stay "in the same place" as with her previous work. Ses magazine's writer Cem Özsancak described Kraliçe as "perhaps the most mediocre album" by Hande Yener. Bugün's Bilal Özcan emphasized that Yener should not have used the title 'kraliçe' (queen) and criticized her decision to use the title as her album's name. Özcan added that by showing Yener with a crown in the photographs she would not become a queen and wrote that Sezen Aksu was the artist who deserved this title. In an appearance on Aramızda Kalsın, he stated that he could not figure out that Yener was "queen of what".

== Music videos ==
The first music video for Kraliçe was prepared for the song "Hasta", which in some critics's opinion was inspired by the pop hits of the 1990s. The video was directed by Kemal Doğulu and recorded at the Adile Sultan Palace. The song ranked second on Turkey's official music chart and topped many radio lists in Turkey. In February 2013, it became the most listened Turkish song on TTNET Müzik. At the award ceremony organized by Pal FM, "Hasta" was nominated for the Best Song award but lost it to Mustafa Ceceli's "Es" (Es, 2012).

Kraliçe's second music video was made for the album's fifth song "Bir Bela". On 25 February 2013, the shooting began with a team of thirty-five and was completed in forty-two hours. The video was directed by Kubilay Kasap and Brazilian model Victor Brandt de Querioz appeared as Yener's partner in it. The music video, which was released on 11 March 2013, tells the story of two lovers who were causing troubles for each other but could not break apart.

== Kraliçe + Ya Ya Ya Ya ==
On 14 May 2013, Hande Yener released her new song "Ya Ya Ya Ya", which was written and composed by Berksan. The song became the fastest rising work on Turkey's official music chart, rising from the 280th position to the top 25 and eventually ranked second on the list. On 25 May 2013, the song's remixes were released on iTunes. Two days later, on 27 May 2013, these remixes together with the album Kraliçe were released as a two-disc edition under the title Kraliçe + Ya Ya Ya Ya by Poll Production. On the disc, besides "Ya Ya Ya Ya"'s original version, an acoustic version and remixes by Mert Hakan, Ümit Kuzer and Berna Öztürk were included, making the total number of songs on the second disc five. Kraliçe + Ya Ya Ya Ya sold 20,000 copies by the end of the year.

== Track listing ==
All tracks are written by Sinan Akçıl.

No.	Title	Composer(s)	Length
1.	"Intro"		0:28
2.	"Görevimiz Aşk"	Sinan Akçıl	4:07
3.	"Hasta"	Akçıl · Emrah Karaduman	3:46
4.	"Kraliçe"	Akçıl	3:40
5.	"Bir Bela"	Akçıl · Karaduman	4:33
6.	"Bir Şey Var"	Akçıl	3:38
7.	"An Meselesi"	Akçıl	4:08
8.	"Sana Söylüyorum"	Akçıl	3:37
9.	"Tribe Gir"	Dan Levy · Olivia Merilahti	3:16
10.	"Hasta" (Dj Pantelis Remix)	Akçıl · Karaduman	3:55
11.	"Kraliçe" (Dj Pantelis Remix)	Akçıl	3:54
12.	"Hasta" (Mert Hakan Remix)	Akçıl · Karaduman	3:59
Total length:			43:01

Kraliçe + Ya Ya Ya Ya - Disc 1
No.	Title	Length
1.	"Intro"	0:28
2.	"Görevimiz Aşk"	4:07
3.	"Hasta"	3:46
4.	"Kraliçe"	3:40
5.	"Bir Bela"	4:33
6.	"Bir Şey Var"	3:38
7.	"An Meselesi"	4:08
8.	"Sana Söylüyorum"	3:37
9.	"Tribe Gir"	3:16
10.	"Hasta" (Dj Pantelis Remix)	3:55
11.	"Kraliçe" (Dj Pantelis Remix)	3:54
12.	"Hasta" (Mert Hakan Remix)	3:59
Total length:		43:01

Kraliçe + Ya Ya Ya Ya - Disc 2
No.	Title	Writer(s)	Arrangement	Length
1.	"Ya Ya Ya Ya" (Original Version)	Berksan	Turaç Berkay Özer	2:54
2.	"Ya Ya Ya Ya" (Mert Hakan Remix)	Berksan	Mert Hakan	4:10
3.	"Ya Ya Ya Ya" (Ümit Kuzer Version)	Berksan	Ümit Kuzer	2:54
4.	"Ya Ya Ya Ya" (Berna Öztürk Remix)	Berksan	Berna Öztürk	4:33
5.	"Ya Ya Ya Ya" (Acoustic Version)	Berksan	Özer	2:54
Total length:				17:25

== Personnel ==
- Hande Yener – main vocals, supervisor
- Sinan Akçıl – songwriter, composer, producer, solo vocals, arranger, mixing, keyboards, synth bass
- Polat Yağcı – producer
- Emrah Karaduman – composer, arranger, solo vocals
- Ümit Kuzer – arranger, mixing, percussion, rhythm programming
- Martin Cru Pencer – recording, mixing
- Gültekin Kaçar – acoustic guitar, electric guitar
- Birkan Şener – bass guitar
- Berkay Şahin – backing vocals
- Deniz Yalçın – backing vocals
- Murat Aziret – backing vocals
- Yeşim Vatan – backing vocals
- Robin Schmidt – mastering
- Virus Production (Istanbul, Turkey) – studio
- Universal Takim Edition – Sinan Akçıl Edition Rights
- Kemal Doğulu – art director, hair, makeup, photographer
- Süleyman Demirel – costume
- Hakan Akkaya – costume
- Ahmet Terzioğlu – graphic design
- Selim Akar – brand and PR consultant

Credits adapted from Kraliçe's album booklet.

== Charts ==
Chart (2012)	Peak position
Turkey (D&R Best-Selling Albums)	3

== Sales ==
Country	Sales
Kraliçe
Turkey (MÜ-YAP)	79,997
Kraliçe + Ya Ya Ya Ya
Turkey (MÜ-YAP)	20,000

== Release history ==
Country	Date	Format(s)	Label
Kraliçe
Turkey	12 December 2012	CD · digital download	Poll Production
Worldwide	12 December 2012	Digital download	Poll Production
Kraliçe + Ya Ya Ya Ya
Turkey	27 May 2013	CD	Poll Production
