= Rüya =

Rüya may refer to:

- Rüya (Hande Yener and Seksendört album), 2012
- Rüya (TV series), 2017 Turkish television series
- Rüya Taner (born 1971), Turkish Cypriot pianist
