= Chokan =

Chokan may refer to:

- Chōkan, an era in Japanese history
- Chokan Valikhanov (1835–1865), first Kazakh scholar, ethnographer and historian
- Chokan, the nickname of Japanese restaurant owner Toru Hashimoto
