= Hande'yle Yaz Bitmez =

Remix album by Hande Yener
- Released: 13 September 2010
- Genre: Pop · electronic
- Length: 48:06
- Label: Poll

Hande Yener chronology
Hande'ye Neler Oluyor? (2010)	Hande'yle Yaz Bitmez (2010)	Teşekkürler (2011)

Hande'yle Yaz Bitmez (Summer Doesn't End with Hande) is the first remix album by Turkish singer Hande Yener. It was released on 13 September 2010 by Poll Production and was her second album to be released by this company. It contains elements of pop and electronic music. It was prepared to celebrate the success of Yener's previous album Hande'ye Neler Oluyor? (2010). The album was produced by Polat Yağcı.

Hande'yle Yaz Bitmez contains remixed versions of some of the songs found in Hande'ye Neler Oluyor?, which was released in April 2010. Sinan Akçıl wrote and composed the new song "Uzaylı" for this album. With 11 songs in total, the album includes the normal version of "Uzaylı" together with its E.C dance remix and club remix, the club remix of "Yasak Aşk", the S.A remix and club remix of "Bodrum", the club remix of "Sopa" together with its chill out mix and acoustic version, the club remix of "Çöp" and a remixed version of "Bi Gideni mi Var?". The album ranked eighth on D&R's Best-Selling list.

== Background and release ==
After the 2009 release of her electronic album Hayrola?, Hande Yener started to have disagreements with the production company Avrupa Müzik and ended her contract with them. In November 2009, it was reported that she would return to making pop music and on 1 April 2010 Poll Production released her new pop album Hande'ye Neler Oluyor?. All of the songs on the album were written and composed by Sinan Akçıl and, after releasing one music video for both the songs "Sopa" and "Yasak Aşk", another music video was made and released for "Bodrum" in June 2010. "Sopa" ranked fourth on Türkçe Top 20, while "Bodrum" topped the official chart. In August 2010, Yener declared herself a "concert queen" and released a statement on her Facebook account, saying: "There is little time left to finally meet the aliens". In the same month, it was confirmed that Yener was working on a new album, and on 20 August 2010 it was reported that Sinan Akçıl had composed the song "Uzaylı" (Alien) for the album and the song, together with remixed versions of "the most popular songs of Hande Yener", would be released on 1 September. On 27 August, the photographs for the album were released, and the next day it was announced that the album would be titled Hande'yle Yaz Hiç Bitmez. Yener stated that this album was a celebration for the success of her previous album Hande'ye Neler Oluyor?. On 1 September 2010, it was confirmed that the release date for the album had been postponed. It was released on 13 September 2010 in compact disc and digital formats by Poll Production.

== Content ==
Hande'yle Yaz Bitmez, which was released on 13 September 2010, contains elements of pop and electronic music, and features remixed versions of some of the songs found in Yener's eighth studio album Hande'ye Neler Oluyor? (2010) together with the new song "Uzaylı", written and composed by Sinan Akçıl. With 11 songs in total, it includes the normal version of "Uzaylı" together with its E.C dance and club remixes, the club remix of "Yasak Aşk", the S.A remix and club remix of "Bodrum", the club remix of "Sopa" together with its chill out mix and acoustic version, the club remix of "Çöp" and a remixed version of "Bi Gideni mi Var?". Radioman Michael Kuyucu wrote that the remixed version of "Çöp" and the acoustic version of "Sopa" caught his attention, and added that Hande Yener was now "in form".

The album ranked among the top ten on D&R Best-Selling list and its only music video was made for the song "Uzaylı". The video was directed by Kemal Doğulu and recorded on the coast of Şile, Istanbul, by a team of seventy people. İbrahim Kendirci appeared as Yener's partner in the music video, which was released on 17 September 2010. "Uzaylı" ranked among the top ten songs on many radio stations and rose to the third position on Turkey's official music chart.

== Track listing ==
All tracks written and all music composed by Sinan Akçıl.

No.	Title	Remix producer/Arranger	Length
1.	"Uzaylı"	Tolga Kılıç · Sinan Akçıl	3:54
2.	"Uzaylı" (E.C Dance Remix)	Emirhan Cengiz	3:55
3.	"Yasak Aşk" (Club Remix)	Yalçın Aşan Project	4:38
4.	"Bodrum" (S.A Remix)	Sinan Akçıl	4:37
5.	"Sopa" (Club Remix)	Yalçın Aşan Project	4:44
6.	"Çöp" (Club Remix)	Yalçın Aşan Project	4:57
7.	"Sopa" (Acoustic)	Sinan Akçıl · Serkan Ölçer	3:10
8.	"Bi Gideni mi Var?" (Remix)	Rıza Esendemir	3:34
9.	"Bodrum" (Club Remix)	Yalçın Aşan Project	5:11
10.	"Sopa" (Chill Out Mix)	Sinan Akçıl	4:56
11.	"Uzaylı" (Club Remix)	Yalçın Aşan Project	4:25
Total length:			48:06

== Personnel ==
- Hande Yener – artist
- Sinan Akçıl – songwriter, composer, arranger, supervisor, remix producer
- Poll Production – production, press and public relations
- Polat Yağcı – producer, manager
- Robin Schmidt (Hamburg) and Jamer Reynolds (London) – mastering
- Babajim and S.A – studio
- Emirhan Cengiz – remix producer
- Yalçın Aşan Project – remix producer
- Rıza Esendemir – remix producer
- Tolga Kılıç – arranger
- Serkan Ölçer – arranger
- Gültekin Kaçar – guitars
- Birkan Şener – bass guitar
- Özgür Yurtoğlu – mixing
- Kemal Doğulu – photographer
- Oğuz Ulusoy – graphics
- Cihan Nacar – costume
- Origami Ajans – printing

Credits adapted from Hande'yle Yaz Bitmez's album cover.

== Charts ==
Chart (2010)	Peak position
Turkey (D&R Best-Selling)	8

== Release history ==
Country	Date	Format	Label
Turkey	13 September 2010	CD · digital download	Poll Production
Worldwide	13 September 2010	Digital download	Poll Production
