= 84 =

84 may refer to:

- 84 (number), the natural number following 83 and preceding 85
- one of the years 84 BC, AD 84, 1984, 2084, 2184
- 84 (restaurant), a secret café in Shibuya, Tokyo
- The international calling code for Vietnam
- 84 Lumber, a building materials supply company
- Eighty Four, Pennsylvania, an unincorporated census-designated place in Washington County, Pennsylvania, United States
- Seksendört, a Turkish pop group whose name means 84
- 84 Klio, a minor planet part of the Asteroid belt

== See also ==
- 84th (disambiguation)
- List of highways numbered 84
- 8-4, Japanese video game localization company
