= J84 =

J84 may refer to:

== Vehicular ==
- HMS Franklin (J84), a British Royal Navy WW2 Halcyon-class minesweeper
- Renault Scénic (model code J84), a compact MPV
- LNER Class J84, a British locomotive class designed by Thomas Wheatley

== Other uses ==
- Snub disphenoid (Johnson solid J_{84})
- South Observatory (obsevatory code J84), Clanfield, UK; see List of observatory codes

== See also ==
- Shenyang J-8 IV "Finback", a Chinese jet fighter plane, a variant of the MiG-21
- 84 (disambiguation)
- J (disambiguation)
