= Hashimoto =

Hashimoto (橋本) is a Japanese name meaning 'base of bridge', from hashi (橋) 'bridge' and moto (本) 'base'. It may refer to:

- Hashimoto (surname)
- Hashimoto, a place in the city of Sagamihara, Kanagawa, Japan
- Hashimoto, Wakayama, a city in Wakayama Prefecture, Japan
- Hashimoto-san, a fictional mouse appearing in Terrytoons theatrical cartoons

== See also ==
- Hashimoto's thyroiditis, the most common form of thyroiditis
- Hashimoto's encephalopathy, a rare neuroendocrine disorder
