= Hashimoto (surname) =

Hashimoto (written: 橋本 lit. "base of bridge") is the 27th most common Japanese surname. A less common variant is 橋下 (lit. "under bridge"). Notable people with the surname include:

- Ai Hashimoto (橋本 愛; born 1996), Japanese fashion model and actress
- Chihiro Hashimoto (橋本 千紘; born 1992), Japanese professional wrestler
- Daichi Hashimoto (橋本 大地; born 1992), Japanese professional wrestler
- Daijiro Hashimoto (橋本 大二郎; born 1947), Japanese politician
- Daiki Hashimoto (橋本 大輝; born 2001), Japanese artistic gymnast
- Fumiyuki Hashimoto (橋本 史之; born 1982), Japanese professional wrestler
- Hashimoto Gahō (橋本 雅邦; 1835–1908), Japanese painter
- Hakaru Hashimoto (橋本 策; 1881–1934), Japanese physician who first described Hashimoto's thyroiditis
- Hajime Hashimoto (橋本 一; born 1968), Japanese filmmaker of Category:Films directed by Hajime Hashimoto
- Hiroshi Hashimoto (fencer) (橋本 寛; born 1964), Japanese fencer
- Hiroshi Hashimoto (water polo) (橋本 博; born 1950), Japanese water polo player
- Honoka Hashimoto (橋本 帆乃香; born 1998), Japanese table tennis player
- Kanna Hashimoto (橋本 環奈; born 1999), Japanese actress, singer and idol
- Kazuhisa Hashimoto (橋本 和久; 1958–2020), Japanese video game developer
- Kazuki Hashimoto (橋本 和樹; born 1990), Japanese professional wrestler
- Kazuo Hashimoto (橋本 和芙; died 1995), Japanese inventor
- Kento Hashimoto (橋本 拳人; born 1993), Japanese footballer
- Kimiko Hashimoto (橋本 きみ子; born 1953), Japanese women's basketball player
- Kingoro Hashimoto (橋本 欣五郎; 1890–1957), Japanese soldier and political activist
- Kunihiko Hashimoto (橋本 國彦; 1904–1949), Japanese classical composer, violinist, conductor and music educator
- Hashimoto Mantaro (橋本 萬太郎; 1932–1987), Japanese Sinologist
- Miyuki Hashimoto (橋本 みゆき; born 1980), Japanese singer
- Mochitsura Hashimoto (橋本 以行; 1909–2000), Imperial Japanese Navy officer
- Morihiro Hashimoto (橋本 守容; 1977–2017), Japanese darts player
- Nanami Hashimoto (橋本 奈々未; born 1993), Japanese model, actress, radio personality and idol
- Hashimoto Natsuko (橋本 夏子; 1856–1873), Japanese concubine
- Reika Hashimoto (橋本 麗香; born 1980), Japanese actress and model
- Richard A. Hashimoto | |1932-2022}}, Colonel, US Air Force, expert in Air Traffic Control; Bronze Star Medal, Legion of Merit.
- Richard Hashimoto ||born unk.}} Producer and Assistant Director, Academy Award nominee.
- Rikuto Hashimoto (橋本 陸斗; born 2005), Japanese footballer of mixed Japanese-Bangladeshi descent
- Ryoma Hashimoto (橋本 竜馬; born 1988), Japanese basketball player
- Ryosuke Hashimoto (橋本 良亮; born 1993), Japanese singer and idol,
- Ryutaro Hashimoto (橋本 龍太郎; 1937–2006), Japanese politician and 82nd and 83rd Prime Minister of Japan, leader of the Hashimoto faction
- Sanai Hashimoto (橋本 左内; 1834–1859), Japanese samurai
- Shinkichi Hashimoto (橋本 進吉; 1882–1945), Japanese linguist
- Shinobu Hashimoto (橋本 忍; 1918–2018), Japanese screenwriter, film director, and producer
- Shintarō Hashimoto (橋本 信太郎; 1892–1945), Imperial Japanese Navy admiral
- Shinya Hashimoto (橋本 真也; 1965–2005), Japanese professional wrestler
- Shobai Hashimoto (橋本 上倍), a fictional character from Danganronpa Another 2: The Moon of Hope and Sun of Despair
- Hashimoto Shoji (橋本 昌二; 1935–2009), Japanese go player
- Soichi Hashimoto (橋本 壮市; born 1991), Japanese judoka
- Takanori Hashimoto (橋本 崇載; born 1983), Japanese shogi player
- Tōru Hashimoto (橋下 徹; born 1969), Japanese politician and lawyer
- Toru Hashimoto (restaurateur), Japanese restaurant owner and former video game developer.
- Tsunao Hashimoto (橋本 綱夫; died 2016), Japanese businessman and Chief Scout of the Scout Association of Japan
- Hashimoto Utaro (橋本 宇太郎; 1907–1994), Japanese go player
- Wataru Hashimoto (橋本 和; born 1986), Japanese footballer
- Yasuko Hashimoto (橋本 康子; born 1975), Japanese long-distance runner
- Yukari Hashimoto (橋本 由香利; born 1966), Japanese composer and arranger
- Yūki Hashimoto (baseball) (橋本 侑樹; born 1998), Japanese baseball player
- Yuki Hashimoto (footballer) (橋本 裕貴; born 1994), Japanese footballer
- Yuki Hashimoto (judoka) (橋本 優貴; born 1989), Japanese judoka
