= Aylin Aslım =

Turkish singer, songwriter and actress

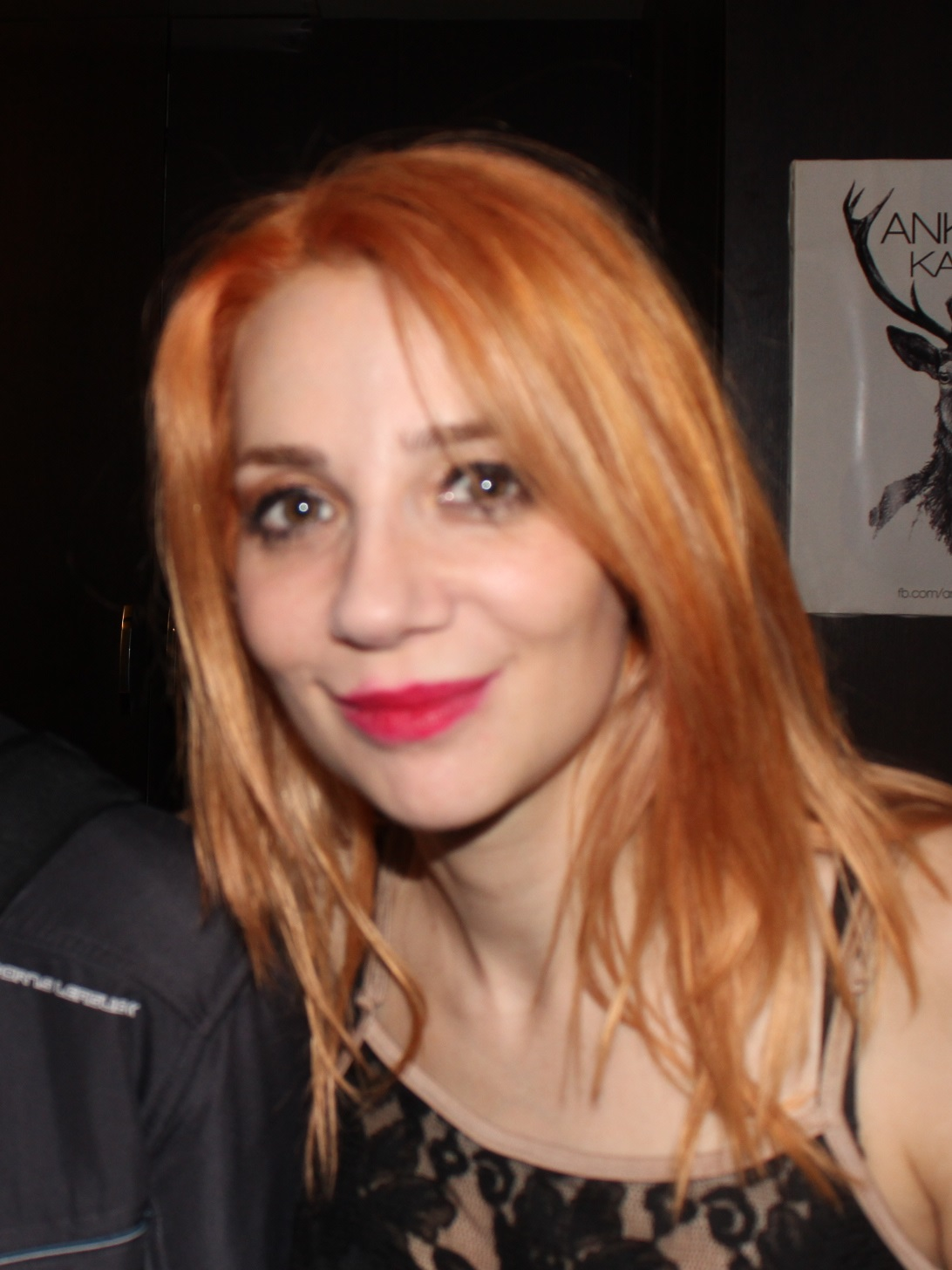
- Aslım backstage after her Ankara concert at IF.

Background information
- Born: 14 February 1976 (age 50); Lich, Hesse, Germany
- Origin: Turkey
- Genres: Alternative rock
- Occupations: Singer, songwriter, actress
- Years active: 1994–present
- Labels: Power Records, Pasaj Müzik

Aylin Aslım (born 14 February 1976) is a Turkish singer, songwriter and actress.

Aylin Aslım was born in Lich, Hessen, Germany into a Turkish family but moved to Turkey when she was only one year old. She sang in several rock and electronica bands in several night clubs in Istanbul. Her first album Gelgit, released in 2001, was more of an electronic album. However, she switched back to rock in her later releases, one of which is her second album, "Gülyabani", which was released in 2005.

As of mid 2010s, Aslım lives in Kaş, where she owns the Gagarin Bar. In November 2020 she married Utku Vargı. On 23 April 2021, she gave birth to her first child Orman Umut Çağlan.

== Discography ==
=== Gelgit (2000) ===
1. Senin Gibi
2. Dalgalar
3. Zor Günler
4. Yıldızlar Var
5. Keşke
6. 4 Gün 4 Gece
7. Birgün
8. Küçük Sevgilim
9. Aynı
10. Senin Gibi (Aylin Gibi)

Senin Gibi's 2nd version "Aylin Gibi" was included in the 2nd edition of the Gelgit album.

=== Gülyabani (2005) ===
1. İntro
2. Gülyabani
3. Ben Kalender Meşrebim
4. Böyledir Bu İşler
5. Kayıp Kızlar
6. Sokak İnsanları
7. Olduğun Gibi
8. Hadi Buyur
9. Güldünya
10. Ahh
11. Gelinlik Sarhoşluğu (Bana Ne) - feat. Ayben
12. Beyoğlu Kimin Oğlu

=== Canını Seven Kaçsın (2009) ===
1. Sen mi
2. Kızlar Anlar
3. Hoşuna Gitmedi mi (Kızkaçıran)
4. Güzel Gözlu Güzel Çocuk
5. İçtim İçtim
6. Aşk Geri Gelir (Music Video)
7. K.A.L.P.
8. Güzel Günler

=== Zümrüdüanka (2013) ===
1. İki Zavallı Kuş - feat. Teoman
2. Ölünür de
3. Hasret
4. Küçük Bey
5. Zümrüdüanka
6. Af
7. İşte Sana Bir Tango
8. Usta

== Filmography ==
- Son (TV series, 2012): Selen
- Şarkı Söyleyen Kadınlar (2014)
- Adana İşi (2015): Kontes
