= Teşekkürler =

Studio album by Hande Yener
- Released: 20 September 2011
- Genre: Pop
- Length: 48:12
- Label: Poll
- Producer: Polat Yağcı

Hande Yener chronology
Hande'yle Yaz Bitmez (2010)	Teşekkürler (2011)	Rüya (2012)

Singles from Teşekkürler
- 1. "Bana Anlat" Released: 15 June 2011

Teşekkürler (Thanks) is the ninth studio album by Turkish singer Hande Yener. It was released on 20 September 2011 by Poll Production. It contains elements of pop music and was Yener's first studio album since the 2010 release of Hande'ye Neler Oluyor?, with which she returned to making pop music. All of the songs on the album were written and composed by Sinan Akçıl, who had also prepared the entire songs on Yener's previous album as well. The album was produced by Polat Yağcı.

Containing 12 songs in total, Teşekkürler was dedicated by Yener to her fans and described as a "Summary of 11 Years of Career". Music critics were split in two groups on their reaction to the album: Some praised it, while others wrote negative reviews and compared various aspects of it to Yener's earlier albums. The first song from the album to be released was "Bana Anlat", which was performed by Yener at the Golden Butterfly Awards in June 2011 and released as a promotional single. Following the album's release, separate music videos were released for the songs "Unutulmuyor", "Teşekkürler", "Havaalanı" and "Dön Bana" respectively.

The album was promoted live on Kral TV the night before its release and was ordered over 59,000 times. Yener performed the album's songs on various TV programs, including Beyaz Show and Bugün Ne Giysem?, and gave a number of concerts across Turkey to promote the album. The remixed versions of some of the album's songs were later included in the album Rüya, which was released in June 2012.

== Background and release ==
In late 2009, Hande Yener announced that she would set electronic music aside and return to making pop music. She released her eighth studio album Hande'ye Neler Oluyor? in 2010. After the release of Hande'ye Neler Oluyor?, Yener continued her career by releasing the remix album Hande'yle Yaz Bitmez (September, 2010) and in April 2011 she was featured on the song "Atma" from Sinan Akçıl's first studio album Kalp Sesi. Two months later on 13 June 2011 Yener received the Best Turkish Female Pop Music Soloist at the 38th Golden Butterfly Awards. After receiving this award she performed the song "Bana Anlat" from her upcoming ninth studio album. The song was later released as a promotional single on digital platforms.

On 7 August 2011, Yener announced on her Facebook account that her new album would be released in August and that it would contain 13 new songs and one 1 remix. However, the album was not released in August and on 5 September 2011 it was stated that the release date was set as 16 September 2011. In the following days, the lyrics for some of the songs were released online. On 15 September, a part of the song "Havaalanı" was released as a teaser together with a video. In the video, the album's cover was shown and the release date was announced as 19 September 2011. It was also mentioned that the album would contain 12 songs.

On 19 September 2011, the distribution process for Hande Yener's ninth studio album, Teşekkürler, began and on 20 September 2011 it was released by Poll Production in CD and digital formats. Like its predecessor, Hande'ye Neler Oluyor?, all of the songs on the album were written and composed by Sinan Akçıl. Akçıl was also featured on the song "Teşekkürler", after which the album itself was named. Polat Yağcı produced the album, which was dedicated by Yener to her fans and described as a "Summary of 11 Years of Career". She also thanked the production staff on the album's cover. Teşekkürler was promoted on 19 September on a special program on Kral TV. A plaque of appreciation was also presented to those attending the ceremony that night. Teşekkürler sold 59,906 copies and was nominated for the Best Album award at the award ceremony organized by Siyaset Dergisi but did not receive it.

== Critical reception ==
Just like Hande Yener's previous album Hande'ye Neler Oluyor?, the opinions of critics were divided about Teşekkürler as well. While some praised the album, others compared it to Yener's previous works and wrote negative reviews. Radio personality and journalist Michael Kuyucu published a positive review and described it as a "foolproof" album. He believed that Akçıl had succeeded in not repeating himself. He also praised the song Aşkın Dili (Nonazayi) for its use of different languages in its chorus. Radiowoman Mine Ayman praised Yener's voice and believed that she deserved to receive the plaque of appreciation on the album's promotion night, however, she criticized the album. Ayman titled her review "Who will thank who for this forced album?" and stated that the album was released in a rush. She named "Bana Anlat" as the album's best piece, and added that Teşekkürler could not "bring Yener back to success". Music website Gerçek Pop also published a negative review and gave the album 2 out of 5 stars. The reviewer mentioned that Yener had made a mistake by "sticking to one musician" to make her albums and compared Teşekkürler to Yener's previous studio album Hande'ye Neler Oluyor?. He added that the "most consistent lyrics" in the album could be found in the song "Havaalanı". DJ and radio progammer Olcay Tanberken also criticized the album and compared some songs in the album to Yener's previous songs from various aspects and just like Ayman named the song "Bana Anlat" as the best piece in the album. Ayrıca Tanberken believed that the album's cover was "no different from Demet Akalın's album cover" and added that Teşekkürler was not "an album that deserves to be memorable".

== Music videos ==
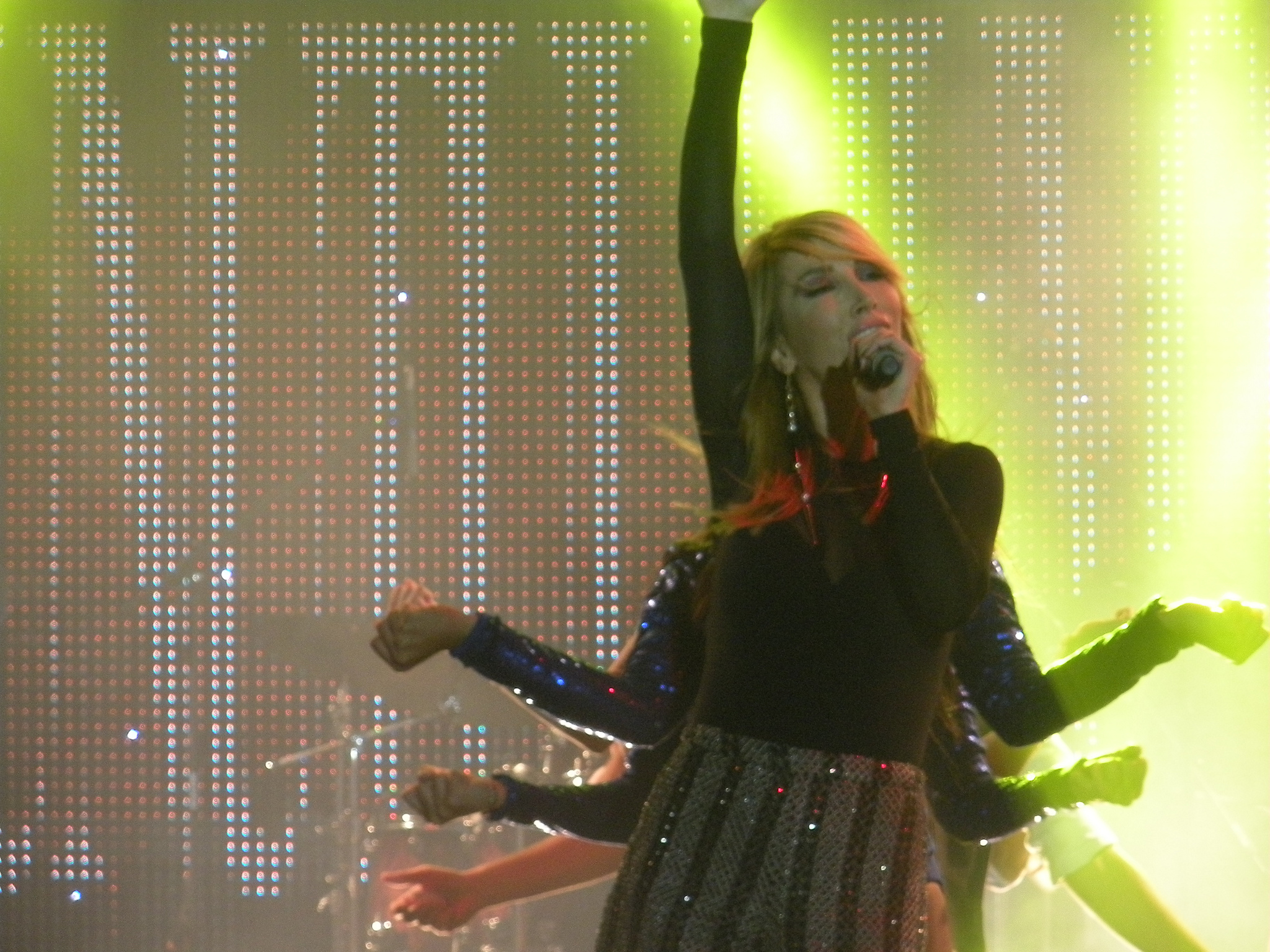
Yener performing the song "Unutulmuyor"

Hande Yener promoted Teşekkürler as "appealing to both old individuals and young people" and released five music videos for the album. The first music video was made for the promotional single "Bana Anlat". The video was directed by Kemal Doğulu and recorded over the course of 14 hours in Şile. It was released in July 2011. The second music video was prepared for the album's opening song "Unutulmuyor". It was directed by Şenol Korkmaz and six female dances appeared alongside Yener in the video, which was recorded in Paris. The music video was first released on 22 November 2011 on Poll Production's Facebook page. It was nominated for the Best Dance Music Video award at the award ceremony organized by Gerçek Pop but did not receive it. On the list of Top 50 songs of 2011 prepared by Kral TV "Unutulmuyor" ranked 21st.

The third music video was made for the song "Teşekkürler", which was performed as a duet together with Sinan Akçıl. The video was directed by Şenol Korkmaz and shot in Iceland. In an interview, Yener stated the recording began at the temperature of -10 °C, and added that she was taken to the location by helicopters that passed over mountains. On 7 February 2012, Poll Production released the music video on its Facebook page. At the award ceremony organized by Number 1 TV, the song was nominated for the Best Duet of the Year award but did not receive it. The fourth music video was prepared for the song "Havaalanı". It was made as an animated video and released on 7 May 2012 on Yener's official website. The last music video was directed by Kemal Doğulu and recorded in Amsterdam for the song "Dön Bana". It was released on 1 October 2012.

== Track listing ==
All tracks written and all music composed by Sinan Akçıl.

No.	Title	Length
1.	"Unutulmuyor"	3:50
2.	"Havaalanı"	3:45
3.	"Ben Yokum"	4:27
4.	"Teşekkürler" (duet with Sinan Akçıl)	4:01
5.	"Aşkın Dili (Nonazayi)"	4:11
6.	"Dön Bana"	4:23
7.	"Kalbine Bulutluyum"	4:16
8.	"Keşke"	3:46
9.	"Böyle Biriyim"	4:08
10.	"Aşk Müziği"	4:03
11.	"Bana Anlat"	3:47
12.	"Vakti Yok"	3:32
Total length:		48:12

== Personnel ==
- Poll Production – production, management, public relations
- Polat Yağcı – producer
- Hande Yener – supervisor
- Sinan Akçıl – songwriter, composer, arranger, music director, vocals, keyboards, bowed string instruments partition, electric guitar
- Kemal Doğulu – photographs
- Semih Güngör – styling
- Çınar Müzik – distribution
- Enver Günen – arranger, keyboards, drums program
- Birkan JR. Şener – bass guitar
- S.A.E.G. Strings – bowed string instruments
- Gültekin Kaçar – electric, acoustic guitar
- Murat Yeter – drums
- Enes Erkan – graphics
- Sander Van Heide – mastering
- Altın Duble Klasik Yaylı Grubu – bowed string instruments
- Emrah Karaduman – arranger, keyboards, drums, vocals
- Selkan Ölçer – acoustic guitar
- Ali Yılmaz – electric bağlama
- Volga Tamöz – arranger, keyboards, drum program
- Maestro Studios – studio
- Selim Çaldıran – recording, vocals
- Patrick Muhren – mixing, recording
- Marşandiz – studio
- Yeşim Vatan – vocals
- Berkay – vocals
- Tarık Ceran – mixing
- Amsterdam Arnold Muhren Studios – studio
- Nezih Üçler – vocals
- Elif Kaya – vocals
- London Back Studios – studio

Credits adapted from Teşekkürler's album booklet.

== Sales ==
Country	Sales
Turkey (MÜ-YAP)	59,906

== Release history ==
Country	Date	Format	Label
Turkey	20 September 2011	CD · digital download	Poll Production
Worldwide	20 September 2011	Digital download	Poll Production
