= 84th Wing =

84th Wing may refer to:

- No. 84 Wing RAAF, a unit of the United Kingdom Royal Air Force
- 84th Combat Sustainment Wing, a unit of the United States Air Force
- 84th Fighter Wing (World War II), a unit of the United States Air Force

== See also ==
- 84th Division (disambiguation)
- 84th Regiment (disambiguation)
- 84th Squadron (disambiguation)
