= Hayrola? =

Studio album by Hande Yener
- Released: 31 March 2009
- Genre: Electronic · electropop
- Length: 43:19
- Label: Avrupa
- Producer: TPA Production · T-Ekspres

Hande Yener chronology
Hipnoz (2008)	Hayrola? (2009)	Hande'ye Neler Oluyor? (2010)

Hayrola? (What's Up?) is the seventh studio album by Turkish singer Hande Yener. It was first released on 31 March 2009 by Avrupa Müzik on digital platforms and then as CD and cassette in music markets on 6 April 2009. It was Yener's first studio album since her separation from Erol Köse Production and her first major work since the release of Hipnoz (2008). The album contains elements of electronic music. Yener solely wrote seven of the album's ten songs, and wrote two others together with Ayşe Özyılmazel and Erol Temizel respectively. One of the songs in the album was written by Aylin Aslım. All of the pieces were composed and arranged by Erol Temizel.

Hayrola? received generally positive reviews from music critics, some of whom added that the album was of high quality but did not include a song that could surpass "Romeo" (Nasıl Delirdim?, 2007). Teoman and Ali Seval were the featuring artists in the album. Teoman performed the song "Arsız" together with Yener, while Seval appeared on "Ne Rüyası?". The album's first and only music video was released for the song "Hayrola?". The video was directed by Kemal Doğulu. The song ranked third on Turkey's official music chart.

In June 2009, it was disclosed that Hayrola? had sold 37,000 copies, and this resulted in problems between Hande Yener and the production company Avrupa Müzik about making a second music video for the album. As the company did not let Yener prepare the second music video, she terminated the two-album contract unilaterally and in November 2009 it was reported that she would return to making pop music.

== Background and release ==
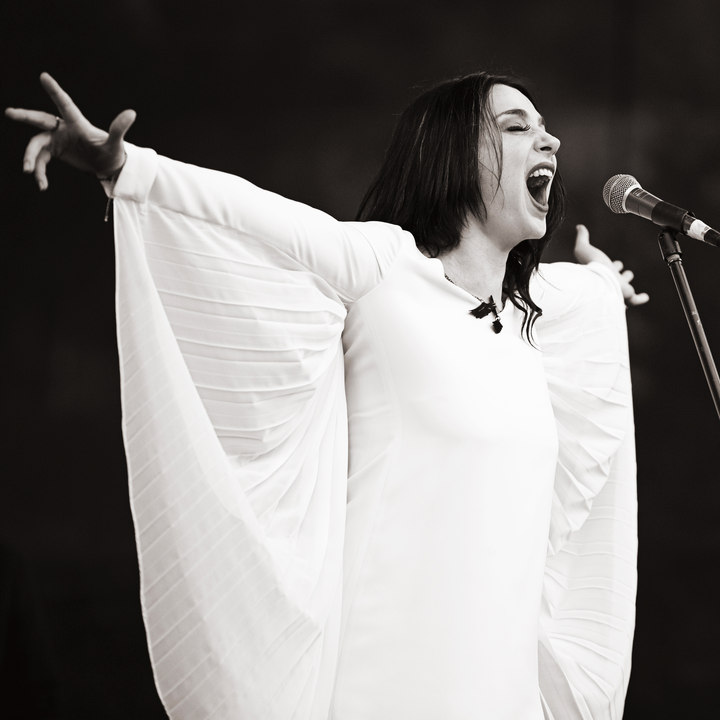
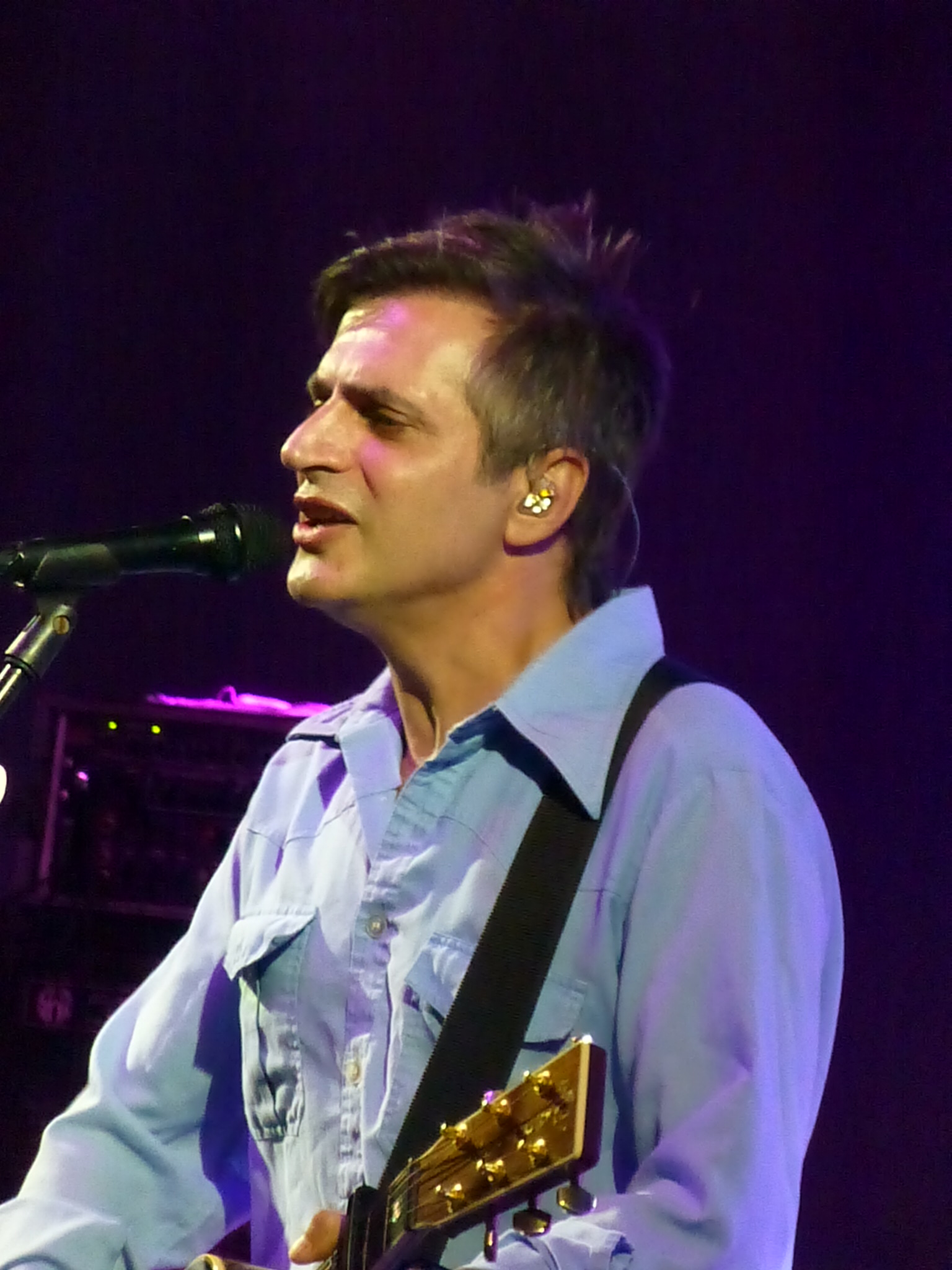
Aylin Aslım (left) wrote the song "Siz". Teoman (right) was featured on "Arsız".

After making a transition from pop music to electronic music, in 2008 Hande Yener's new electronic album Hipnoz was released by Erol Köse Production. All of the songs were composed by Erol Temizel, eight of which were solely written by Yener. The album's only music video was released for the song "Hipnoz". After the album's release, Yener started to have disagreements with the producer of her albums since 2002, Erol Köse, and in October 2008 she confirmed that she was no longer working with Köse's company. As a result, a number of production companies offered new deals to Yener. On 1 November 2008, she signed a contract with Avrupa Müzik to produce two new albums. In the same month, it was reported that Yener had started the preparation process for her next studio album. In December 2008, it was confirmed that she was recording new songs for her album.

In Mart 2009, recordings for Hande Yener's seventh studio album were finished, and it was announced that it would be released in April 2009. Meanwhile, the album's photographs were released. Yener said that the album was born with a new energy and she had included anything "secretive or hidden" that she had felt in the album. On 31 March 2009, Hande Yener's new studio album Hayrola? was released by Avrupa Müzik on digital platforms. On 6 April 2009, the album was made available for sale as compact disc and cassette in the music markets. Yener stated that she had decided to change her style with this album and voice the songs with "a more humane tone". She further added that the album was "intended as a medication for people", and that it was a work that reflected her inner self. Hande Yener wrote seven of the album's ten songs, one of which "Narsist" was dedicated to her then-fiancé Kadir Doğulu. She wrote "Ok Yay" together with Erol Temizel, and "Sarhoş Dünya" together with Ayşe Özyılmazel. The song "Siz" was the album's only song that was written by Aylin Aslım. Erol Temizel did all of the compositions and arrangements. Teoman and Ali Seval appeared as featuring artists on two of the album's songs. Teoman was featured on "Arsız", while Seval performed "Ne Rüyası?" together with Yener. Recordings were done at T-Ekspres Studios and the album's photographs were taken by Kemal Doğulu.

Containing elements of electronic music, Hayrola? was initially ordered over 30,000 times. It garnered 20,000 more orders, making the total number of orders rise to 50,000. In mid 2009, the number of sales of albums for the first six months of the year in Turkey were announced. Hayrola? sold 37,000 copies and ranked sixteenth on the list.

== Critical reception ==
Hayrola? received generally positive reviews from music critics and was described as an album with high quality. Music website Gerçek Pop, titled its review for the album "Hope Nothing's Wrong " and gave it three out of five stars. It was written that the album was "too good to be described as a bad album" and Yener's "best works were done together with Erol Köse". The website named "Ok Yay" as Yener's best song since the release of "Sen Anla" (Nasıl Delirdim?, 2007). Radio personality Michael Kuyucu believed that Yener was now "in a line away from the polluted waters of popular music" and described Hayrola? as an electronic album with "high quality". He said that there was an integrity within the album and praised Erol Temizel for his work, but stated that the album's lead singer was not as good as Yener's previous songs such as "Balon" (Sen Yoluna... Ben Yoluma..., 2002), "Kırmızı" (Aşk Kadın Ruhundan Anlamıyor, 2004) and "Romeo" (Nasıl Delirdim?, 2007). Radiowoman Mine Ayman liked Yener's new image and found the album's photographs and cover "very ambitious". She praised the lyrics of the songs but she also mentioned that she was not able to find a song that could surpass "Romeo". Ayman belied that Teoman and Yener's voices were not a good match and she asked electronic music fans to add Hayrola? to their archives.

== Music video ==
The first music video for Hayrola? was made for the album's lead single with the same title. It was recorded at Limonata Studios and directed by Kemal Doğulu. The music video was released in April 2009. Yener was accompanied by four female dancers in the video. The video started with Hande Yener's name appearing as a flash of lightning in the dark air. After the lightning, the sunlight started to appear, the singer descended from the clouds and began to sing the song. Hürriyet's writer Onur Baştürk believed that there were "Madonna vibes" in the video and gave it seven out of ten. "Hayrola?" ranked among the top three in a number of radio stations and rose to the third position on Turkey's official music chart.

Making a second music video for the album turned into a controversial subject and caused disagreements between Hande Yener and the production company Avrupa Müzik. Yener issued a warning to the company on the grounds that the second video had not been made, and terminated the existing two-album contract unilaterally at the end of 2009. In November, it was reported that she had returned to making pop music and was about to start working with a new production company.

== Track listing ==
No.	Title	Writer(s)	Composer(s)	Length
1.	"Hayrola?"	Hande Yener	Erol Temizel	4:02
2.	"Ok Yay"	Yener · Temizel	Temizel	4:27
3.	"Arsız" (duet with Teoman)	Yener	Temizel	4:27
4.	"Deliler"	Yener	Temizel	4:09
5.	"Senden Uzakta"	Yener	Temizel	4:12
6.	"Narsist"	Yener	Temizel	4:24
7.	"Ne Rüyası?" (duet with Ali Seval)	Yener	Temizel	4:06
8.	"Siz"	Aylin Aslım	Temizel	4:04
9.	"Sarhoş Dünya"	Yener · Ayşe Özyılmazel	Temizel	5:03
10.	"En Uzun Gece"	Yener	Temizel	4:25
Total length:				43:19

== Personnel ==
- Avrupa Müzik – production company
- Hande Yener – main vocals, songwriter
- Erol Temizel – songwriter, composer, arranger
- Aylin Aslım – songwriter
- Ayşe Özyılmazel – songwriter
- Teoman – vocals
- Ali Seval – vocals
- TPA Production – production, management
- T-Ekspres – production, mixing, recording, studio
- Bernie Becker – mastering
- Kemal Doğulu – photographer, art director
- Etienne Gaspard – stylist, hair, makeup
- Onur Kanyılmaz – graphic design
- Kadir Doğulu – manager
- FRS Matbaacılık – printing

Credits adapted from Hayrola?'s album booklet.

== Release history ==
Country	Date	Format	Label
Turkey	31 March 2009	Digital download	Avrupa Müzik
Worldwide	31 March 2009	Digital download	Avrupa Müzik
Turkey	6 April 2009	CD · cassette	Avrupa Müzik
