= Rüya (Hande Yener and Seksendört album) =

2012 album by Hande Yener and Seksendört

Remix album by Hande Yener and Seksendört
- Released: 11 June 2012
- Recorded: 2012
- Genre: Pop, pop rock
- Length: 54:47
- Label: Poll Production
- Producer: Polat Yağcı

Hande Yener chronology
| Teşekkürler (2011) | Rüya (2012) | Kraliçe (2012) |

Seksendört chronology
| Akıyor Zaman (2011) | Rüya (2012) | Faili Meçhul (2014) |

Singles from Rüya
- 1. "Rüya" Released: 14 April 2012

Rüya (Dream) is a remix album by Turkish singer Hande Yener and music group Seksendört. It was released on 11 June 2012 by Poll Production. It Yener's first album since the release of Teşekkürler. It was also the first major work by Seksendört since the release of their previous studio album Akıyor Zaman.

The album contains a new version of the song "Rüya", performed by Yener and Seksendört. The song was originally released by the music group Ünlü in 1996. The album also contains a new song written by Sinan Akçıl and titled "Öfkem Var". Remixed versions of Yener and Seksendört's songs from their previous works were included in the album as well.

== Background and release ==
In an interview, Hande Yener stated that working together with Seksendört was Polat Yağcı's idea and added that their duet song was also chosen by Yağcı. A new song written by Sinan Akçıl, titled "Öfkem Var", was recorded and included in the album as well. The song "Rüya" was recorded in the early months of 2012 and released on 14 April 2012 by TTNET Müzik.

== Critical reception ==
The reviews put forward by critics about the album in Turkey were generally positive. Radio personality Michael Kuyucu found the remixes in the album successful and wrote: "'Rüya' is a strange song, it begins with Arabic and unison sounds, and is noisy and I think a bit outside the molds. It's a scary song. The Alaturka motifs inside it did not suit Hande. However, the other song in the album 'Öfkem Var' is a duet out of this frame. I really liked the emotions in this duet. This song suits both Hande and Seksendört. I can say that it's a clean rock song. There is a melodic structure inside it, as well as different emotions." gercekpop.com praised the song "Rüya" by saying: "To make the long story short, they have chosen a good song for covering."

== Track listing ==
| No. | Title | Writer(s) | Remix producer | Length |
|---|---|---|---|---|
| 1. | "Öfkem Var (Hande Yener & Seksendört)" | Sinan Akçıl | | 4:18 |
| 2. | "Rüya (Hande Yener & Seksendört)" | Tayfun Ünlü | | 3:04 |
| 3. | "Rüya (Remix)" | Tayfun Ünlü | Tayfun Ünlü | 3:31 |
| 4. | "Havaalanı (Remix)" | Sinan Akçıl | Cihat Uğurel | 4:32 |
| 5. | "Hayır Olamaz (Remix)" | Haluk Kurosman, Tuna Velibaşoğlu | Cihat Uğurel | 3:11 |
| 6. | "Unutulmuyor (House Mix)" | Sinan Akçıl | Cihat Uğurel | 6:39 |
| 7. | "Söyle (Remix)" | Tuna Velibaşoğlu | Cihat Uğurel | 3:47 |
| 8. | "Rüya (Remix)" | Tayfun Ünlü | Cihat Uğurel | 3:24 |
| 9. | "Şimdi Hayat (Remix)" | Haluk Kurosman, Tuna Velibaşoğlu | Mustafa Yıldırım | 4:22 |
| 10. | "Havaalanı (Remix)" | Sinan Akçıl | Mustafa Yıldırım | 4:49 |
| 11. | "Öfkem Var (Hande Yener)" | Sinan Akçıl | | 4:19 |
| 12. | "Öfkem Var (Seksendört)" | Sinan Akçıl | | 4:24 |
| 13. | "Rüya (Remix)" | Tayfun Ünlü | Ümit Kuzer | 4:21 |
| Total length: | | | | 54:47 |
