= 84th Street =

84th Street may refer to:

- 84 Street, Edmonton, Alberta, Canada
- 84th Street (Manhattan), New York City
- 84th Street (IRT Third Avenue Line), New York City
