= 84 Squadron =

84 Squadron or 84th Squadron may refer to:

- No. 84 Squadron RAAF, a unit of the Royal Australian Air Force
- No. 84 Squadron RAF, a unit of the United Kingdom Royal Air Force
- 84th Flying Training Squadron, a unit of the United States Air Force
- VF-84 (Fighter Squadron 84), a unit of the United States Navy
- HSC-84 (Helicopter Sea Combat Squadron 84), a unit of the United States Navy

== See also ==
- 84th Division (disambiguation)
- 84th Wing (disambiguation)
- 84th Regiment (disambiguation)
