= Hipnoz =

Studio album by Hande Yener
- Released: 27 May 2008
- Genre: Electronic · electropop
- Length: 47:43
- Label: Erol Köse
- Producer: Hande Yener · Erol Temizel

Hande Yener chronology
Nasıl Delirdim? (2007)	Hipnoz (2008)	Hayrola? (2009)

Hipnoz (Hypnosis) is the sixth studio album by Turkish singer Hande Yener. It was released on 27 May 2008 by Erol Köse Production. It features elements of electronic music, and was the singer's first studio album since the 2007 release of Nasıl Delirdim?. Yener wrote eight of the album's songs on her own, making her the songwriter whose name appears the most in the album. Two of the album's songs were written by Mor ve Ötesi's vocalist Harun Tekin. The compositions, recordings, and arrangements were done by Erol Temizel, who produced the album together with Yener.

Hipnoz, which consists of a total of 10 songs and is centered around the idea of "anything can happen at any time in life," was described as a more deliberate experiment by Yener. Special sound effects were applied to the singer's voice. Music critics reacted to the album in different ways. Some wrote that the album was born as a reaction by the singer to the market as she was moving away from pop music, while others came across a senseless Hande Yener in the songs and noted the similarities between the album and Madonna's Confessions on a Dance Floor (2005). The album's only music video was made for the lead singer "Hipnoz". The video was directed by Kemal Doğulu. Later, there was a problem with the video's broadcast on television channels, as it was reported that it had been banned on the grounds that it was encouraging sadomasochism.

In Turkey, Hipnoz ranked fifth on D&R's list of best-selling albums. The album sold 40,000 copies by the end of the year, becoming the thirty third best-selling album inside Turkey. Hande Yener, who had worked with Erol Köse Production since the album Sen Yoluna... Ben Yoluma... (2002), ended her contract with the company after paying a compensation due to "low energy and disputes". On 1 November 2008, she signed a new contract with Avrupa Müzik. Hipnoz became Yener's last album that was produced and released by Erol Köse Production.

== Background ==
In 2006, Yener released Apayrı which featured elements of electronic music, followed by the EP Hande Maxi which was released in the same year, an album with touches of house music. With the release of her fifth studio album Nasıl Delirdim? in 2007, she completely started to make electronic music. In December 2007, it was reported that Hande Yener had started working on her next studio album. In March 2008, Yener announced that she was planning on releasing the album by the end of the year and that she was trying new things through trial and error. Hürriyet's journalist Onur Baştürk wrote in an article published on 7 April 2008 that after talking to Yener before one of her concerts he had learned that the new studio album would come out in May. Additionally Baştürk asked Yener why she was releasing multiple albums so fact. Yener responded by saying that it was a requirement for her work to keep her music up to date. In 2008, Yener dyed her hair pink and published the photographs for the album, which were taken by Kemal Doğulu. The photographs were said to have been inspired by the style of American singer Marilyn Manson.

== Release and content ==
On 27 May 2008, Hande Yener's sixth studio album Hipnoz was released by Erol Köse Production. The album features elements of electronic music and contains ten songs, eight of which were written by Yener. She later talked about her experience as a songwriter: "When I was writing Hipnoz, I thought that everything had a time, and that time was actually determined by us. Some things had to change in order to make other things happen. I had a lot to say. I had to pour out my heart." The two other songs in the album, "İyi Günler" and "Kumar (Putlar)", were written by Mor ve Ötesi's vocalist Harun Tekin. All of the compositions, recordings and arrangements were done by Erol Temizel, and the songs were recorded at T-Ekspres Studios. Yener and Temizel produced the album together. Yener wrote and dedicated the song "Gece Gündüz" to her then-boyfriend Kadir Doğulu. The song "Pinokyo" is centered around the idea that lies can help people handle out life for a short period, and Yener later said that during its recording she remembered her childhood, which made her hesitate and cry. She also said that she had written "Yaban Gülü" in a period of difficulties, and later it had helped her to again find the joy in life. Music critics believed that the song "Burdayım", written by Yener and Erol Temizel, was sending out a message to Yener's rivals. The singer revealed that with this song she had tried to give her 17-year-old self a chance to speak and added that she was now in peace with her past. Hipnoz was, in Yener's words, centered around the idea that "anything can happen at any time in life". She later talked about the album in an interview:

"I tried to reflect on many things that I have learned, including music, in this album. I wrote the lyrics, and created its philosophy. In short, this album is my healing album. After Nasıl Delirdim? I realized that music was the thing that could treat me. Now I look at everything in life broadly. So it's kind of hard for me to live in my own boundaries. I wrote the lyrics of the songs with this perspective. So the overall concept of the album is 'anything can happen in life at any time'. [...] As a community, we need people who make positive music. It is an album that will make these people feel very comfortable with its rhythm and words. That's why it's called Hipnoz [hypnosis]. I was aggressive in Nasıl Delirdim?, and now I'm more calm and peaceful. So is my music. In short, I think Hipnoz can make someone that is depressed open up. [...] This album made me see myself in every sense. Now I'm able to feel like a singer. I realized that I had never used my voice so right and professionally. I saw this when I got into electronic music. Because electronic music is very difficult."

Special effects were applied to Yener's voice on Hipnoz, an album that she claimed to be more experimental. In a comparison to Nasıl Delirdim?, she stated that Hipnoz was a more deliberate experiment than its predecessor. She added that in Nasıl Delirdim? she had assumed the role of a mad woman while in Hipnoz she was in a period of healing. The album entered D&R's list of best-selling albums in Turkey as number 10. In 2008 and during the first two weeks of its release, it rose to number 5, its best position on the chart. On its third week, it went down to number 9, and after ranking 10th for another week, it quite the chart. According to MÜ-YAP, by selling 40,000 copies in 2008, Hipnoz became the thirty third best-selling album in Turkey.

== Critical reception ==
Hipnoz received mixed reviews from music critics. Music website Gerçek Pop wrote in its review that this album was showing how "[Hande Yener] was moving away from pop music" and that this work had come into existence through the "reactions she had received from the music market". The website gave the album three out of five stars and named the songs "İyi Günler" and "İp" as the best pieces in the album. It was further added that the album could only please Yener's dedicated fans, and compared to Nasıl Delirdim? it was not a good idea for Yener to write the songs on her own. Radikal's Kahraman Çayırlı published a positive review for the album. He stated that in the album he was able to see "a woman who was trying to break her shell" and described the album as "one of the beautiful stops in her music journey". He also recommended listening to the songs repeatedly. Radio personality Michael Kuyucu wrote that singer was getting away from the popular culture and with this album she had replaced the hot, friendly, and defiant Hande Yener with a cold and emotionless woman. Kuyucu also wrote that Yener had assumed electronic music was equal to a high quality work, but she had ended up with producing a work that was just mean to provide commercial success. He also added that the songs lacked melody and emotional elements and were all similar to each other. Journalist Naim Dilmener found the album boring and commented on Yener's career: "She was the golden girl of pop music. Her decision to put pop aside and surrendering herself completely to electronic music that has a narrow frame of fans is really odd." Billboard Türkiye's writer Atilla Aydoğdu wrote in his review: "The music is in the forefront not the songs, but this doesn't mean anything by itself. [...] The lyrics were so didactic." Akşam's Mehmet Özdoğan wrote in a review in 2013 and stated that there was evident similarities between the album's songs and those of Madonna's Confessions on a Dance Floor (2005).

== Music videos ==
Before the album's release it was reported that Yener's first music video for her new album would be "Pinokyo" and that it was going to be directed by Luca Tommassini in Italy. After the album was released, it was confirmed that the lead single was going to be the song "Hipnoz" and a music video was being prepared for it. The video for this song, which was centered around the idea that all kinds of evil, negativity, pessimism, and negativity can be overcome with love, was recorded mostly at the Istanbul Great London Hotel and directed by the album's art director Kemal Doğulu. In parts of the video, Yener was bounded to a hypnosis wheel. A few days after the music video was released, on 19 June 2008 it was reported that the video was banned by RTÜK in Turkey as it contained scenes which encouraged sadomasochism. Yener later announced that the reports were false and that the video was not banned. She also stated that TV channels had stopped broadcasting the video due to these reports. Later on, it was revealed that no broadcast ban had been applied to the video after RTÜK issued a document and addressed the issue.

Yener later announced that she wanted to end her contract with Erol Köse Production, the company with which she had worked since her second studio album Sen Yoluna... Ben Yoluma.... She cited low energy and lack of excitement on the company's side as the reason for her decision. Meanwhile, Hipnoz was released. In Yener's opinion, the company was no longer interested in promoting the album after they heard about her decision. As a result of more disagreements, the singer terminated her contract with the company by paying compensation. The news about her separation from the company were confirmed in October 2008. As a result, many companies offered new deals to Yener. On 1 November 2008, Hande Yener signed a contract with Avrupa Müzik to produce two new albums. Thereby, Hipnoz became the singer's last album that was released by Erol Köse Production.

== Track listing ==
No.	Title	Writer(s)	Composer(s)	Length
1.	"Hipnoz"	Hande Yener	Erol Temizel	5:00
2.	"İyi Günler"	Harun Tekin	Temizel	4:13
3.	"Pinokyo"	Yener	Temizel	4:55
4.	"Kumar (Putlar)"	Tekin	Temizel	5:11
5.	"Sanma"	Yener	Temizel	4:45
6.	"Yarasa"	Yener	Temizel	4:33
7.	"Yaban Gülü"	Yener	Temizel	5:04
8.	"Burdayım" (duet with Erol Temizel)	Yener	Temizel	4:47
9.	"Gece Gündüz"	Yener	Temizel	4:38
10.	"İp"	Yener	Temizel	5:24
Total length:				47:43

== Personnel ==
- Hande Yener – singer, producer, songwriter
- Erol Temizel – composer, arranger, vocals, producer, mixing, mastering, recording
- Harun Tekin – songwriter
- Erol Köse – producer (head of Erol Köse Production)
- Erol Köse Production (Üçüncü Göz Ltd.) – production company
- TPA – production
- T-Ekspres – studio
- Kemal Doğulu – photographer, art director, stylist, hair, make-up
- Selim Baklacı – costume
- Kadir Doğulu – manager
- FRS – printing

Credits adapted from Hipnoz's album booklet.

== Charts ==
Chart (2008)	Peak position
Turkey (D&R Best-Selling Albums)	5

== Release history ==
Country	Date	Format	Label	Ref.
Turkey	27 May 2008	CD · cassette · digital download	Erol Köse Production	
Worldwide	27 May 2008	Digital download	Erol Köse Production	
United Kingdom	8 July 2008	CD	Erol Köse Production	
