= 84th Brigade =

84th Brigade may refer to:

== British India ==
- 84th Indian Infantry Brigade

== Russia/Soviet Union ==
- 84th Anti-Aircraft Rocket Brigade

== Spain ==
- 84th Mixed Brigade

== United Kingdom ==
- 84th Brigade (United Kingdom)
- 84th Brigade, Royal Field Artillery, a British Army unit in World War I
- 84th (East Anglian) Brigade, Royal Field Artillery, a British Army unit after World War I

== See also ==
- 84th Division (disambiguation)
- 84th Regiment (disambiguation)
