= Takanori Hashimoto =

Japanese shogi player

- Native name: 橋本崇載
- Born: March 3, 1983 (age 42)
- Hometown: Komatsu, Ishikawa

Career
- Achieved professional status: April 1, 2001 (aged 18)
- Badge Number: 239
- Rank: 8-dan
- Retired: April 2, 2021 (aged 38)
- Teacher: Shōji Kenmochi (9-dan)
- Career record: 414–303 (.577)

Websites
- JSA profile page

Takanori Hashimoto (橋本 崇載, Hashimoto Takanori; born March 3, 1983) is a Japanese former professional shogi player who achieved the rank of 8-dan.

== Shogi professional ==
Hashimoto was granted an official leave of absence from active play from October 1, 2020, until March 31, 2021, for personal reasons by the Japan Shogi Association. On April 2, 2021, he informed the JSA that he had decided to retire altogether as an active professional shogi player, and the JSA announced later that day that it had accepted Hashimoto's retirement request. Hashimoto's retired with a career record of 414 wins and 303 losses for a winning percentage of 0.577.

=== Promotion history ===
The promotion history for Hashimoto was as follows:

- 6-kyū: 1994
- 1-dan: 1996
- 4-dan: April 1, 2001
- 5-dan: February 24, 2005
- 6-dan: April 1, 2006
- 7-dan: September 22, 2006
- 8-dan: February 3, 2012

== Personal life ==
=== Custody dispute and arrests ===
On November 2, 2022, Hashimoto notified the JSA of his intention to resign as a member for personal reasons effective immediately and submitted his formal resignation papers. The JSA acknowledged his request and announced he was no longer a member later that same day. Hashimoto subsequently explained his reasons for resigning via his YouTube channel and on Twitter stating that he did not want his involvement in a custody dispute with his wife over his young son and his public criticism of the Japanese government regarding its position on parental child abduction to adversely impact the JSA in any way.

Hashimoto was arrested in December 2022 for posting a photograph of his ex-wife and other defamatory content about her in August 2022 on Twitter, but he was eventually released. On January 17, 2023, he was re-arrested again on suspicion of the same charge for posting similar content on Twitter in November 2022 after his ex-wife filed a complaint with the police. Hashimoto was indicted for defamation and sentenced to one year and six months in prison, suspended for four years, by the Ōtsu District Court on June 23, 2023.

On July 20, 2023, Hashimoto was arrested a third time, this time for suspicion of attempted murder after breaking into the house where his ex-wife was staying and trying to kill her and her father with hoe-like weapon.
