= IF Performance Hall =

Coordinates: 39.9116°N 32.8560°E

IF Performance Hall is an indoor concert venue in Ankara, founded on 2004. The venue hosted many concert and entertainment parties, therefore become one of the most popular venues in Turkey. Fahir Öğünç, radio host of Modern Sabahlar was the owner of the venue till late 2000s. The venue is currently owned by Gönül Adamları group as in 2015.

In early 2015, after a major interior renovation caused move of the concert stage from northeastern to southeastern corner, two homosexual men accused the venue's security staff, as the duo proclaimed were banned for being gay. The venue later explained this incident as those two men has brought alcoholic beverages outside of the venue and disturbing the people entertaining inside. The venue also proclaimed to don't matter any sexual preference as the venue hosted several LGBT musicians such as Cem Adrian in past.

IF Performance Hall Ataşehir is first branch of the IF opened in July 2016 in Istanbul (Asian side). The second branch in European side of Istanbul named after its neighbourhood Beşiktaş, opened in January 2017. IF has two branches more in Zurich, Switzerland (Winter 2018), and Eskişehir (Autumn 2018).
