= 84th Division =

84th Division or 84th Infantry Division may refer to:

- 84th Division (People's Republic of China)
- 84th African Infantry Division, French Army, World War II
- 84th Territorial Infantry Division, French Army, World War I
- 84th Infantry Division (German Empire)
- 84th Infantry Division (Wehrmacht), Germany
- 84th Division (Imperial Japanese Army)
- 84th Infantry Division (Russian Empire)
- 84th Rifle Division, Soviet Union
- 84th Guards Rifle Division, Soviet Union
- 84th Division (Syria)
- 84th Division (United States)

== See also ==
- List of military divisions by number
- 84th Brigade (disambiguation)
- 84th Regiment (disambiguation)
- 84th Squadron (disambiguation)
- 84th Wing (disambiguation)
