= Hande'ye Neler Oluyor? =

Studio album by Hande Yener
- Released: 1 April 2010
- Studios: Sarı Ev; (Istanbul, Turkey); Sinan Akçıl Home Studio; (Istanbul, Turkey)
- Genre: Electronic · pop · electropop
- Length: 57:12
- Label: Poll
- Producer: Hande Yener · Polat Yağcı

Hande Yener chronology
Hayrola? (2009)	Hande'ye Neler Oluyor? (2010)	Hande'yle Yaz Bitmez (2010)

Hande'ye Neler Oluyor? (What's Going On with Hande?) is the eighth studio album by Turkish singer Hande Yener. It was released on 1 April 2010 by Poll Production. The album contains elements of pop music and was Yener's first album released after her return to making pop music. All of the songs on this album were written and composed Sinan Akçıl. The album was produced by Yener and Polat Yağcı.

With 11 songs and 3 remixes, Hande'ye Neler Oluyor? contains 14 songs in total and received mixed reviews from music critics. Some praised the album while others found it unsuccessful compared to Yener's previous albums. For the album's first music video, Yener mixed the two songs "Sopa" and "Yasak Aşk" and released them together as one music video. Two separate music videos were made for the songs "Bodrum" and "Çöp", the first of which topped Türkçe Top 20, while the second one rose to number 9 on the chart.

Hande'ye Neler Oluyor? sold 80,000 copies and received the Best Album award at the TÜREV The Bests of the Year Awards. To promote the album, Yener gave various concerts across Turkey and performed at the 2010 Golden Butterfly Awards and on TV programs such as Beyaz Show and Saba Tümer ile Bu Gece. The remixed versions of some of the album's songs were later included in Hande'yle Yaz Bitmez, which was released in September 2010.

== Background and release ==
Hande Yener's third electronic album Hayrola? was released in April 2009 and its only music video was later released for the album's lead single with the same title. She later went through various court processes due to the disagreements she had with the production company Avrupa Müzik and ended her contract with the company. In November 2009, it was reported that she would return to making pop music and she later performed a number of pop songs from her previous albums in an appearance on Beyaz Show. When asked about her musical style change in an interview she responded: "There'll be no return to the past. [...] I'll try to do better." In December 2009, she stated that for her new album, which was set to be released in 2010, she was working with Sinan Akçıl and added that she was recording the songs at the studio with a new team.

In January 2010, the title of one of the album's songs was announced as "Sopa". In March, the lyrics for the song were published. Meanwhile, the album's photographs, which were taken by Kemal Doğulu, were released. The album was initially set to be released in March 2010, but after the decision to include the song "Böyle Olacak" in the album, the release date was postponed to April 2010. In late March 2010, teasers of the album's songs were made available. On 1 April 2010, Hande Yener's eighth studio album, Hande'ye Neler Oluyor?, was released by Poll Production. The album sold 60,000 copies in one month, and by the end of the year this number rose to 80,000. At the award ceremony organized by Turkey Disability Foundation, the album received the Best Album of the Year award. The album contains 14 songs in total, all of which were written and composed by Sinan Akçıl. Some of the songs were arranged by Akçıl, while Emirhan Cengiz arranged the others. Ziynet Sali and Berkay's vocals were featured on the songs "Sopa" and "Çöp".

== Music and lyrics ==
Hande Yener described Hande'ye Neler Oluyor? as a work suitable "both for listening and playing in the clubs". It was developed as a pop album under the influence of electronic music and was decorated with various dance music effects. All of the songs were written and composed by Sinan Akçıl over the course of four months. Yener continued to use electronic vocals techniques, and unlike her three previous albums she did not write any songs for this album, about which she said: "I needed ideas from another mind. I wanted to sing the lyrics of a man because I find pieces written by men suitable for myself. I love the light harsh rhetoric and the naivety of men." Recordings were done at Akçıl's studio and Sarı Ev. Audio mastering was performed by 24-96 Mastering in Karlsruhe, Germany, and Sterling Sound in New York City, USA.

The album contains 11 new songs, the first of which "Yasak Aşk" is a vibrant electropop song and Akçıl's vocals are featured at the end of it. The song "Bodrum", with the chorus "Bodrum'a da gittik beraber (We went to Bodrum together) / İstanbul'da da yaşadık (We lived in Istanbul as well) / Sorun şehirlerde değildi (The problem was not with the cities) / Biz tam yalandık (We were completely a lie)", is a pop song with a high tempo and was compared to the song "Kırmızı" by music critics. It is followed by "Çöp", a ballad which has Berkay's vocals in the background and was compared by Yavuz Hakan Tok to the song "Acı Veriyor". The fourth song, "Sopa", with its high-tempo and memorable words was compared to Yener's previous hits "Acele Etme" and "Kelepçe". The song was initially written for Ziynet Sali whose vocals were featured in Yener's version. The clarinet sound in the song's demo was removed at Yener's request. The fifth song, "Bi Gideni mi Var?", was described by Onur Baştürk as a "summer ballad". The lyrics "Hakkınsa mutluluk seni bulur (If it's your right, happiness will find you)" were featured in the chorus of "Kal Kal", which has a high tempo. The seventh song, "Boşa Ağlayan Kız", is an example of the singer's "electronic or alternative experiments". It is followed by the pop song "Kalpsiz". The songs "Neden Ayrıldık?" and "Ben Kimim" are, according to Michael Kuyucu, "alternative in some parts, and pop in other parts". The eleventh song "Böyle Olacak" includes electronic rhythms and according to Fatih Melek together with "Kal Kal" it was under the "musical and thematic effect" of the song "Yola Devam".

== Critical reception ==
Hande'ye Neler Oluyor? was praised by some music critics, but received negative feedback from others and in general faced mixed reviews. Some critics claimed that the album was a repetition of the singer's previous works. Hürriyet's journalist Onur Baştürk described the work as "[Yener's] transitional album before hitting the bottom of electronic waters". He believed the album was in consistency with Apayrı (2006) and wrote: "Hande has not completely returned to the past, she's somewhere in between. [...] She has found what she was supposed to find." Writing for BirGün, radio personality Michael Kuyucu described the album as "a new milestone" and wrote: "The album is very successful both in sound and as a repertoire. [...] While the first six songs have pop tones, the album becomes a little bit alternative toward the end. [...] However, the decline in the quality of the compositions at the end of the album draws the attention of the listener."

Gerçek Pop's editor Fatih Melek gave the album two out of five and wrote: "For the past three years the singer has become more and more drained away, and her sad but haughty [musical] transition turned her from a burning flame to ashes, and in 2010 she has returned to repeating her cheap and blameworthy self." He also accused Yener of "presenting works far more than unsatisfactory by forcing composers to complete the entire album". Hayat Müzik's critics Yavuz Hakan Tok believed that Sinan Akçıl had composed the new songs under the influence of Yener's previous works to "return relegated Hande, who wasted so much time on electronic music, to pop's first league without showing her true colors". Writing for Müzik Gazetesi, radioman Ahmet Kamil Taşkın found the album's songs similar to Yener's previous works: "I felt the need to respond to the title of the album as it's a question. She's turning into history, it's a shame." Radio personality Mine Ayman believed the album was a "mixture of her [Yener's] past and present style" and by claiming that she had not been affected by even "one of the songs in the album" described all the pieces as "garbage".

== Music videos ==
In March 2010, it was reported that the first music video for Hande'ye Neler Oluyor? was about to be made for the song "Yasak Aşk". However, Yener decided to have the song "Sopa" and "Yasak Aşk" combined in one music video, which was directed by Kemal Doğulu and recorded at Ciner Studios in Küçükçekmece, Istanbul. The music video was released on 14 April 2010. The first part of the video covered the song "Sopa", while the second part was made for "Yasak Aşk". Later, a separate music video for "Sopa" was released. "Sopa" ranked fourth on Türkçe Top 20.

In May 2010, it was confirmed by Hande Yener that Hande'ye Neler Oluyor?'s second music video would be prepared for the song "Bodrum". The video was directed by Kemal Doğulu and shot in Kuşadası. Yener was accompanied by twenty models on the music video, which was released on 17 June 2010. "Bodrum" topped Türkçe Top 20 and ranked first on a number of radio stations. The song received the Best Lyrics, Composition, and Song awards at the 14th İstanbul FM Golden Awards. It was also nominated as the Best Song from the Republic of Turkey at the Balkan Music Awards.

Hande'ye Neler Oluyor?'s last music video was made for the song "Çöp", which featured vocals by Berkay in the background. Yener later performed the song at the 2010 Golden Butterfly Awards. The song's music video was recorded in Silivri and directed by Kemal Doğulu. It was released in December 2010. The song ranked 9th on Türkçe Top 20, 28th on Kral TV's 2010 list, and 40th on PowerTürk TV's 2011 list. It was also nominated for the Best Composition award at the 2011 Kral Music Awards but lost it to Tarkan's "Sevdanın Son Vuruşu".

== Track listing ==
All tracks written and all music composed by Sinan Akçıl.

No.	Title	Length
1.	"Yasak Aşk"	3:56
2.	"Bodrum"	3:45
3.	"Çöp"	4:49
4.	"Sopa"	4:02
5.	"Bi Gideni mi Var?"	3:55
6.	"Kal Kal"	4:20
7.	"Boşa Ağlayan Kız"	3:57
8.	"Kalpsiz"	4:04
9.	"Neden Ayrıldık?"	4:41
10.	"Ben Kimim?"	4:04
11.	"Böyle Olacak"	3:55
12.	"Yasak Aşk" (Remix)	3:59
13.	"Sopa" (Dance Remix)	4:01
14.	"Sopa" (Club Remix)	3:44
Total length:		57:12

== Personnel ==
- Hande Yener – main vocals, producer, supervisor
- Sinan Akçıl – songwriter, composer, arranger, music director, keyboard, acoustic guitar, bass guitar, backing vocals, Pro Tools program&edit
- Emirhan Cengiz – arranger, keyboard, Pro Tools program&edit
- Gültekin Kaçar – acoustic guitar
- Serkan Ölçer – electro guitar
- Alp Ersönmez – bass guitar
- Birkan Sener – bass guitar
- Ozan Doğulu – piano
- Nilgün Ketenci – violin
- Rüstem Mustafayev – violin
- Elçin Özsaylık – violin
- Yaren Budak – violin
- Erman İmayhan – cello
- Berkay Şahin – backing vocals
- Ziynet Sali – backing vocals
- Erol Temizel – mixing
- Jamer Reynolds – mixing, logic program&edit
- Seda Seber – recording
- Sinan Akçıl Home Studio – recording
- Sarıev – recording
- Sterling Sound – mastering
- 24-96 Germany – mastering
- Poll Production – production, press public relations
- Polat Yağcı – producer
- Çınar Müzik – general distribution
- Kemal Doğulu – photographer, creative director
- Hakan Oktaş – styling
- Origami Ajans – printing
- TPA Müzik – management
- Kadir Doğulu – manager

Credits adapted from Hande'ye Neler Oluyor?'s album booklet.

== Release history ==
Country	Date	Format(s)	Label
Turkey	1 April 2010	CD · digital download	Poll Production
Worldwide	1 April 2010	Digital download	Poll Production
