= Seksendört =

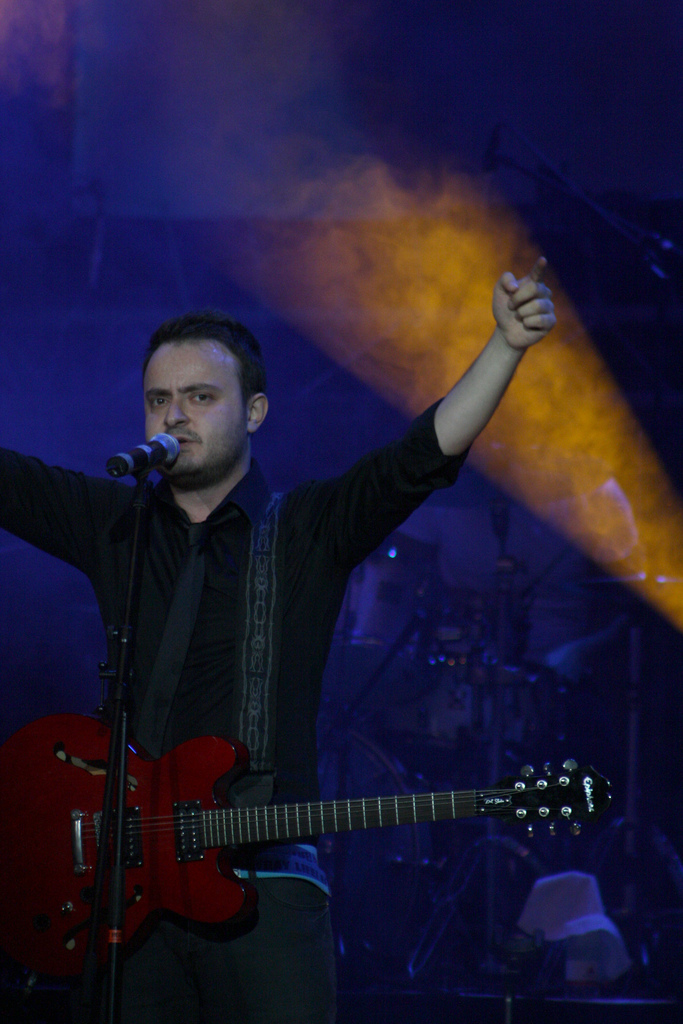
- Tuna Velibaşoğlu performing with Seksendört on stage

Background information
- Origin: Ankara, Turkey
- Genre: Pop rock
- Years active: 1999–present
- Label: Poll Production
- Members: Tuna Velibaşoğlu; Arif Erdem Ocak; Serter Karadeniz; Okan Özen
- Past members: Doğan Umut Dal; Ümitcan Tuncer
- Website: seksendort.com.tr

Seksendört (also known as Grup 84) is a Turkish pop rock band from Ankara.

Seksendört consists of Tuna Velibaşoğlu, Arif Erdem Ocak, Serter Karadeniz, and Okan Özen. The band was formed as Sex and Dirt in 1999 and started getting noticed under the name 'Seksendört' in 2005. The band became very popular in Turkey with their album K.G.B.

== Band members ==
- Tuna Velibaşoğlu: Vocals, guitar
- Okan Özen: Bass guitar
- Serter Karadeniz: Drum kit
- Arif Erdem Ocak: Guitar

== Discography ==
=== Albums ===
Year	Title (Details)
2005	Seksendört * Label: Pasaj Müzik * Format: CD, AAC, cassette
2008	K.G.B. * Label: Pasaj Müzik * Format: AAC, cassette
2011	Akıyor Zaman * Label: Poll Production * Format: CD, AAC
2012	Rüya * Label: Poll Production * Format:

=== EPs ===
Year	Title (Details)
2024	Bir Aşk * Label: Sony Music * Format:

=== Singles ===
Year	Title (Details)
2010	Haber Yok * Label: Poll Production * Format: AAC
2014	Faili Meçhul * Label: Poll Production * Format: AAC
2015	Acemiler * Label: Poll Production * Format: AAC
2017	Yorma * Label: Poll Production * Format: CD
2018	Kendimi Kandıramam * Label: Poll Production * Format: CD
2018	Yazıklar Olsun * Label: Poll Production * Format:
2019	Eyvah * Label: Poll Production * Format: AAC
2023	Yara * Label: Sony Music * Format:
