= 84 (restaurant) =

Café in Shibuya, Tokyo

Restaurant information
- Established: February 2015
- Owner: Toru Hashimoto (Chokan)
- Location: Shibuya, Tokyo, Japan
- Website: what.tokyo/84/

84 (pronounced as "Hashi") is a café in Shibuya, Tokyo, run by former Nintendo and video game industry veteran, Toru Hashimoto (more commonly known as Chokan). It was established in 2015 as a members-only café for game industry employees before gradually opening up to the public via reservations.

== History ==
=== Background ===
Toru Hashimoto (born in Hyōgo Prefecture), more commonly known by his nickname of Chokan (Japanese for "Chief"), was a Nintendo employee who joined the company in 1984. He was part of an internal debugging team where he worked titles such as Earthbound, Yoshi's Island and Pokémon Red and Green. After he left Nintendo, he worked at a company named Sarugakucho which focused on debugging and game balance. The company worked on various non-Nintendo games, such as Culdcept. While working at Sarugakucho, he organized a private party named 'Salon de Sarugaku' every six months. Hashimoto claims he got the idea to open a restaurant as a "message from God," and that it'd be like hosting that party every day.

=== Opening ===
84 opened in February 2015 as an exclusive, members-club for game industry personnel. It's exact address is still considered private information. Hashimoto says that part of why its kept secret is due to his love of puzzles.

Since 2018, Hashimoto has run a series of interviews in Japanese magazine "CONTINUE" out of the restaurant where he talks with developers about "anything other than their main job." Some guests include Dragon Quest co-creator Yuji Horii, and CyberConnect2 CEO Hiroshi Matsuyama.

Hashimoto was interested in partially opening up the cafe to the public, but due to the COVID-19 pandemic plans were delayed until 2022. The cafe now operates to the public via reservation tours.

== Notable memorabilia ==
Various signed drawings, photos and memorabilia are used as decorations inside the restaurant, some notable pieces include:

- A drawing of Mario eating rice with a fork and knife by series creator Shigeru Miyamoto.
- A drawing of Super Mario enemy Lakitu by game designer Takashi Tezuka.
- A drawing of Toro from Doko Demo Issyo by character designer Horiguchi Naoshi.
- A Kirby themed plate signed by series creator Masahiro Sakurai.
- A drawing of Link from The Legend of Zelda eating rice by series director Eiji Aonuma.
  - A drawing of Link by The Legend of Zelda manga artist Akira Himekawa.
- Sheet music for the Super Mario Bros. theme signed by composer Koji Kondo.
- A drawing of the Slime enemy from Dragon Quest by series creator Yuji Horii.
- Drawings of Pikachu and Mew by various Game Freak developers including Ken Sugimori, Junichi Masuda and Takao Unno.
- Signed copies of Ico, Shadow of the Colossus and The Last Guardian by Fumito Ueda.
- A drawing of Mega Man by series creator Keiji Inafune.
- A framed message from Mother series creator Shigesato Itoi.
