= 84th Regiment =

84th Regiment or 84th Infantry Regiment may refer to:

- 84th Regiment of Foot (1759), a unit of the British Army, active from 1759 to 1765, which served entirely in British India
- 84th Regiment of Foot (Royal Highland Emigrants), a unit of the British Army, active from 1775 to 1784, which served in the American Revolutionary War
- 84th (York and Lancaster) Regiment of Foot, a unit of the British Army, active from 1793 to 1881, which served in the Napoleonic Wars and in India
- 84th Infantry Regiment (Philippine Commonwealth Army), a unit of the Philippine Commonwealth Army, active from 1942 to 1946, which served in the Second World War

American Civil War

- 84th Illinois Volunteer Infantry Regiment, a unit of the Union (North) Army
- 84th Regiment Indiana Infantry, a unit of the Union (North) Army
- 84th New York Volunteer Infantry Regiment, a unit of the Union (Northern) Army
- 84th Ohio Infantry, a unit of the Union (Northern) Army
- 84th Pennsylvania Infantry, a unit of the Union (Northern) Army

== See also ==
- 84th Division (disambiguation)
- 84th Wing (disambiguation)
- 84th Squadron (disambiguation)
