= Sinan Akçıl =

Turkish composer, singer, songwriter and record producer

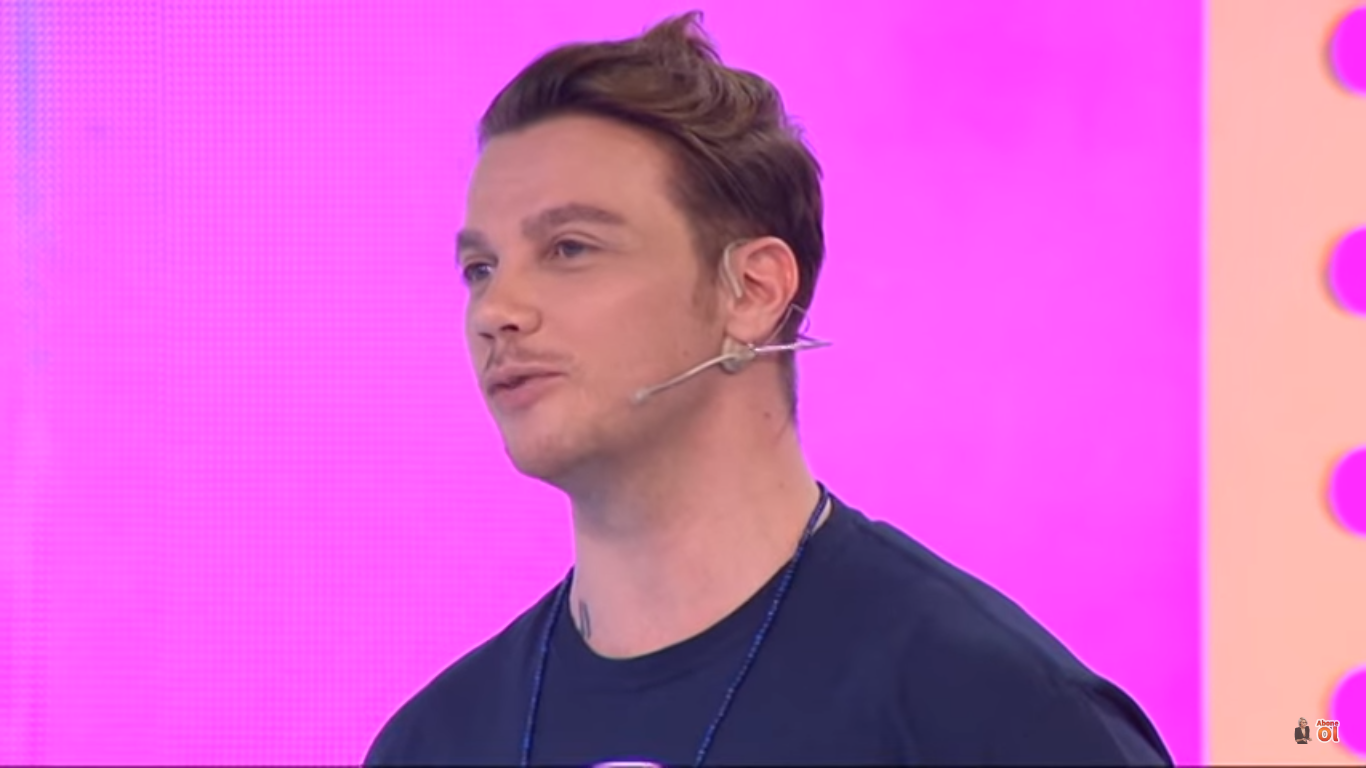
- Akçıl at İşte Benim Stilim in April 2016

Background information
- Born: 20 May 1982 (age 44); Leeuwarden, Netherlands
- Genres: Pop, electronic, R&B
- Occupations: Composer, singer, songwriter, record producer
- Years active: 2011–present
- Labels: Poll; DMC; Lets Menajerlik

Sinan Akçıl (born 20 May 1982) is a Turkish composer, singer, songwriter and record producer. He is known for producing Hadise's Eurovision 2009 song for Turkey, called "Düm Tek Tek". He also collaborated with Maher Zain on the song “Gülmek Sadaka”.

== Personal life ==
Akçıl was born to Albanian parents in the Netherlands. He published a song with Albanian singer Shyhrete Behluli in 2020 with the title Jam Shqiptar. He married popular Turkish actress and model Burcu Kıratlı in Turkish Consulate in Amsterdam, the Netherlands, on 24 December 2018 with a simple marriage ceremony. The couple divorced in September 2019. They married for the second time on 22 February 2021. They divorced again in May 2022.

== Criticism ==
Radio 99 broadcast director Sema Eryiğit: "His songs aired a lot on the radio programs and in different places. But his live performance was disappointing. Maybe he should just continue working as a composer; [that way] he will not have such a fan base anymore, but it would have been more prestigious in the music world."

Atilla Aydoğdu, the music writer of the Akşam newspaper said: "When summer started I wished he would never sing his own songs anymore. Unfortunately, one does not always get what he wants."

Sinan Akçil responded to the criticism in an interview: "'We wish he had remained a musician, composer, ...'; is this even criticism?" "Two people in a hundred say this! Those are probably the people who live on another planet. 98% of them showed so much love and gave beautiful reactions to the album; I did not even hear the criticism. Also, negative criticism should surely exist. I appreciate your feedback and criticism, please keep up reacting!"

Leman Sam also criticized Akçil and said: "While there are beautiful voices like Burak Kut, I do not understand why someone would want to listen to Sinan Akçıl."

Naim Dilmener wrote in his review: "Sinan Akçıl's voice is a disaster. This is a serious bottom point in this country's vocal history. We have not seen anything like this. You know, in those magazine programs, where they would report on the live performances of singers, even Banu Alkan and Seray Sever were not this bad. I wish he would never sing. When it comes to music, he is not a great musician either. He has not created magnificent pieces. But he's still good in that area, he's not bad. But his voice is really bad."

Tolga Akyıldız: "Sinan has no voice, literally no voice. It's a pity. I think he's a good musician though. He comes from a family of musicians. If it were me, I would continue composing and arranging."

== Discography ==
=== Albums ===
Year	Album	Producer	Sales
2011	Kalp Sesi	Poll Production	42.990+
2012	Karnaval	Poll Production	
2013	Kapı	Poll Production	
2014	Tabi Tabi	DMC	
2015	Best of Aşk	DMC	
2017	Yüzyılın Aşkı	DMC	
2020	Piyanist	Lets Menajerlik	
2022	Piyanist 2	Lets Menajerlik	
2023	Piyanist 3 (Next Generation)	GO & DMC	

=== EPs ===
Year	Album	Producer	Sales
2018	Güzel Şeyler	DMC	
2025	4K	4K Music & DMC	

=== Singles ===
Year	Single	Producer	Sales
2012	İkinci Sen	Dokuz Sekiz Müzik	
2014	Hatırlasana	DMC	
2014	Hoppa	DMC	
2015	Ayıp Yani	DMC	
2016	1001 Gece	DMC	
2016	Şarttır	DMC	
2016	Başka Şansın Yok	DMC	
2018	Gülmek Sadaka	DMC	
2018	Anlarsın	DMC	
2019	Mucize	DMC	
2019	Goy Goy	DMC	
2020	Çok Sevmek Yasaklanmalı	DMC	
2020	Daima Yaşa Azerbaycan	Lets Menajerlik	
2020	Bye Bye	Lets Menajerlik & DMC	
2021	Sefil	DMC	
2021	Hata Bende	Lets Menajerlik	
2021	Mecburum Sana	Lets Menajerlik	
2022	Durum Çok Acil (Acoustic)	Merzigo Music Distribution	
2022	Yollar Seni Gide Gide (Acoustic)	Merzigo Music Distribution	
2022	İsmi Lazım Değil (Acoustic)	Merzigo Music Distribution	
2022	Işıklı Yol (Acoustic)	Merzigo Music Distribution	
2022	Geleceğim Aklına (Acoustic)	Merzigo Music Distribution	
2022	Mesafe (Acoustic)	Merzigo Music Distribution	
2022	Çöp (Acoustic)	Merzigo Music Distribution	
2022	Kızım (Acoustic)	Merzigo Music Distribution	
2022	Simsiyahım (Acoustic)	Merzigo Music Distribution	
2022	Ara Ara (Acoustic)	Merzigo Music Distribution	
2022	Yanımdadır	Mahzen & DMC	
2022	Yaktırma (Mehtar)	Lets Menajerlik	
2022	Ey Aşk (Acoustic)	Merzigo Music Distribution	
2022	Gurur (Acoustic)	Merzigo Music Distribution	
2022	Kıymetlim (Acoustic)	Merzigo Music Distribution	
2022	Öylesine (Acoustic)	Merzigo Music Distribution	
2022	Arada Sırada (Acoustic)	Merzigo Music Distribution	
2022	Bir Devir Bitti (Acoustic)	Merzigo Music Distribution	
2022	Haber Gelmiyor Yardan (Acoustic)	Merzigo Music Distribution	
2022	Bir Bilseydin (Acoustic)	Merzigo Music Distribution	
2022	Yalan (Acoustic)	Merzigo Music Distribution	
2022	Her Şey Güzel Olacak (Acoustic)	Merzigo Music Distribution	
2022	Yanımdadır (Stage Version)	Lets Menajerlik	
2023	Elini Uzat	GO Music	
2023	Derdim	Tarz Müzik	
2023	Kedi	GO & DMC	
2023	Bak Yine Hatırladım	GO Music	
2023	Kay Kay	GO Music & Mahzen Media	
2024	Aşkımız Eser Olur	GO Music	
2024	Hadi Yavrum	GO Music	
2024	Aslan Parçası	GO & DMC	
2024	Fark Atıyor	Formuna Medya	
2024	Anlatamam	GO Music	
2025	Felaket	DMC	
2025	Esme	GO Music	
2025	Bana Aitsin	4K Music & DMC	
