= Mükemmel =

Studio album by Hande Yener
- Released: 2 June 2014
- Studios: Kaya Müzik Studio, Istanbul; Marşandiz, Istanbul; Volga Tamöz's Studio, Istanbul
- Genre: Electronic · pop
- Length: 1:38:59
- Label: Poll
- Producer: Polat Yağcı

Hande Yener chronology
Best of Hande Yener (2014)	Mükemmel (2014)	İki Deli (2015)

Singles from Mükemmel
- 1. "Alt Dudak" Released: 15 April 2014

Mükemmel (Perfect) is the eleventh studio album by Turkish singer Hande Yener. It was released on 2 June 2014 by Poll Production. After working with Sinan Akçıl on her three previous studio albums, Yener ended her friendship with Akçıl and after it became evident that the two would not work together on any projects again, in May 2013 she released the new single "Ya Ya Ya Ya", which was written by Berksan. Following the single's release, she began working on her new studio album, and after years she took new songs from Altan Çetin with whom she had worked on a number of her early albums. Alongside Çetin, Mert Ekren and Volga Tamöz joined the album's personnel as songwriters.

Mükemmel is a pop album with elements of electronic music. After "searching for an ambitious name", Yener eventually titled the album after one of the songs in the track list. While the album's release date was changed several times, the final delay happened following the death of hundreds of miners due to the Soma mine disaster. Due to the huge number of songs in the album, it was decided that it should be released as a two-disc edition. Yener also performed new versions of the songs "Bir Köşede Yalnız" and "Kış Masalı" for the album, both of which were previously released and performed by Ajda Pekkan and Sezen Aksu respectively. On the song "Unutanlar Gibi", Mehmet Erdem appeared as the featuring artist. "O Kadın Gitti" was the only song in the album that was written by Yener herself. Music critics wrote generally positive reviews for the album and praised the "innovation and experimental works" in it.

Mükemmel ranked third on D&R's Best-Selling list in Turkey and, according to MÜ-YAP, it sold more than 50,000 copies. Three separate music videos were released for the songs "Alt Dudak", "Naber" and "Hani Bana", the first of which ranked second on Türkçe Top 20, while the second one rose to the third position on the chart. Mükemmel received the Best Album award at the Golden Objective Awards organized by the Magazin Journalists Association. In April 2015, the album was again released under the title Sebastian + Mükemmel. It was a three-disc edition, the first of which contained Yener's new single "Sebastian" and three other songs which she had performed for other albums. Many of the songs in the album were later included in Yener's compilation album İki Deli, which was released in December 2015. To promote the album, Yener appeared on various television programs and went on a concert tour known as Sebastian 2015 Tour.

== Background and release ==
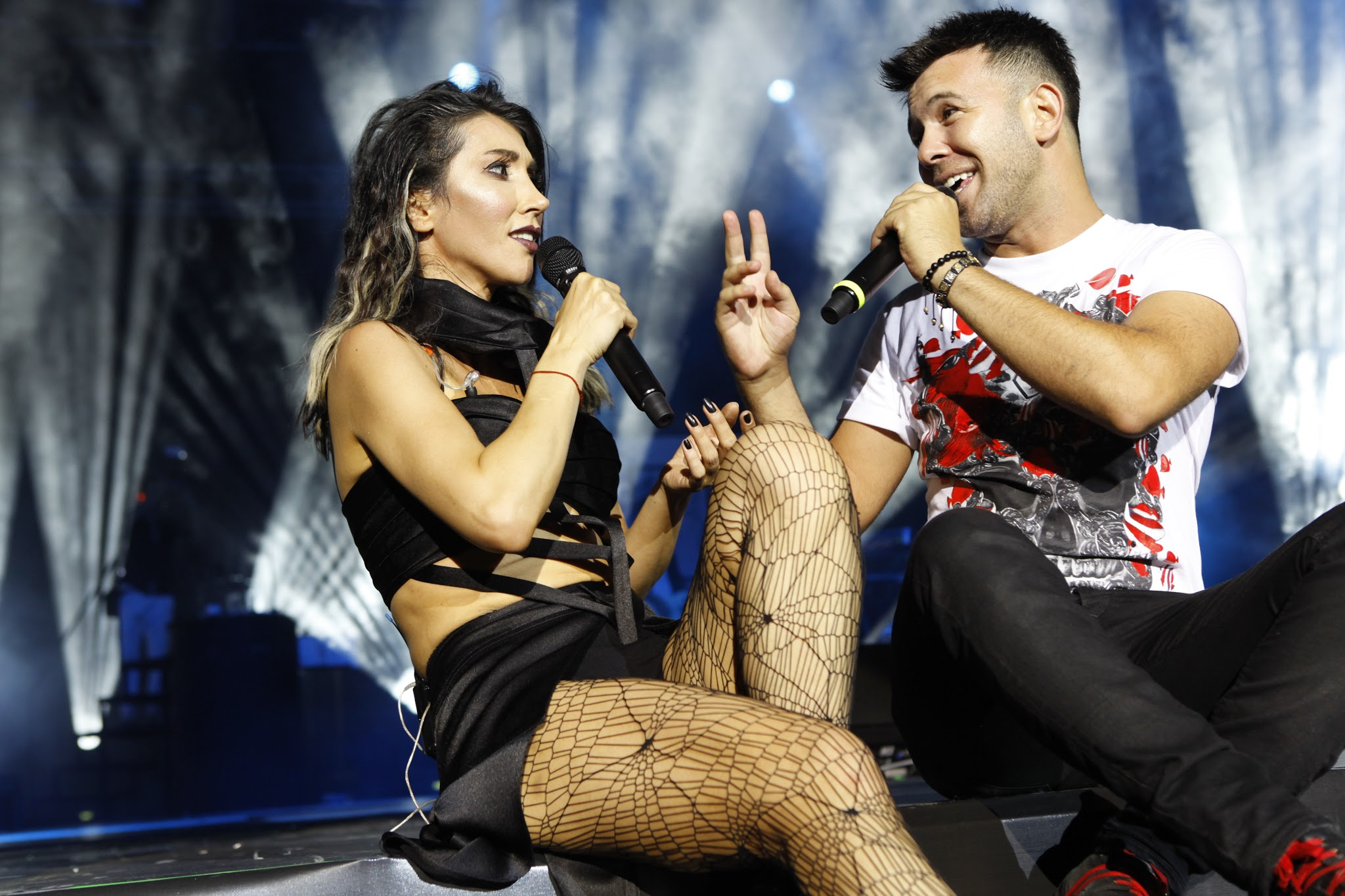
Berksan, who first started working with Yener on the single "Ya Ya Ya Ya", wrote five of the songs in Mükemmel.

After making electronic music for a period of time, Yener started to perform pop songs and released the album Hande'ye Neler Oluyor? in 2010. Sinan Akçıl wrote all of the songs on the album and continued to work with Yener on her subsequent studio albums, Teşekkürler (2011) and Kraliçe (2012). In March 2013, it was reported that Yener and Akçıl's "checkered" friendship had ended and they would not work on the same project again. After her friendship with Akçıl was over, Yener started to take new songs from Berksan. In May 2013, her new single "Ya Ya Ya Ya" was released, followed by "Biri Var" in November 2013, both of which were written by Berksan. "Ya Ya Ya Ya" ranked second on Turkey's official music chart and, after its release, Yener immediately began to work on her new album. In September 2013, it was reported that she had taken new songs from Altan Çetin, who had written songs for her early albums Senden İbaret (2000), Sen Yoluna... Ben Yoluma... (2002) and Aşk Kadın Ruhundan Anlamıyor (2004). On 28 December, Yener stated: "I'm making a whole new album for the new year. All the musicians who have had a big influence in my music career will be a part of this album with their most special songs. Be prepared for surprises. You will be very surprised with this album in the new year. We are working very intensively. The biggest surprise is to start working again with Altan Çetin after 10 years. Together we will bring out beautiful songs again. The album also has a song written by Berksan." On 31 December at her concert, she announced the album's title by saying: "I've started working on the album now, I wish everyone a perfect year because my album is called Mükemmel [Perfect]."

In January 2014, it was confirmed that besides Altan Çetin and Berksan, Mert Ekren would also write a number of the songs in the album. In March, Yener shared the lyrics for the song "O Kadın Gitti" to mark the International Women's Day. In April, it was announced that Mehmet Erdem would be the featuring artist on the song "Unutanlar Gibi". On 15 April, the song "Alt Dudak", written and composed by Altan Çetin, was released as the album's lead single. The track list for Mükemmel was released on 7 May by Hande Yener on her Twitter account. The release date, however, was postponed a number of times. It was first reported that it would be released on 3 March, and later this date was changed to 13 May and 20 May. Following the Soma mine disaster, the release date was further postponed to 2 June. Recordings for the album took place at Kaya Müzik Studio, Marşandiz and Volga Tamöz's Studio. Hande Yener's eleventh studio album, Mükemmel, was released on 2 June 2014 by Poll Production. It ranked third on D&R's Best-Selling list and following its release on iTunes, it was downloaded over 7,000 times in a few hours. By the end of the year, it sold 50,000 copies in Turkey, becoming the seventh best-selling album in 2014.

== Music and visuals ==
Mükemmel is a pop album with elements of electronic music. In Yener's words "It's a complete mix. It contains both Hande Yener's romantic songs, and songs that resemble my old works. The songs that have an electronic effect are a lot of fun. I just wanted an album to impress everyone. I didn't want it to have one style. We included songs with elements of rock and roll, R&B, reggae." As they did not want to choose between the songs that had already been prepared for the album, the company released all of the pieces in a two-disc edition. The album contains fourteen songs, two covers and six remixes. Five remixes were prepared for the song "Alt Dudak", which is the opening piece in both of the discs and was described by Sadi Tirak as an "awesome hit". The song "Herkes Yoluna" is one of the songs on the first disc and was described by Yavuz Hakan Tok as the "album's most powerful hit". "Unutanlar Gibi" was released as a duet between Yener and Mehmet Erdem. Out of the album's two cover songs, the first one was included in the album's first disc, and was a cover of Sezen Aksu's song "Kış Masalı" from her album Sezen Aksu Söylüyor (1989) (Its name was changed to "Bir Kış Masalı" in the album). The second cover, "Bir Köşede Yalnız", was included in the second disc and was originally performed by Ajda Pekkan for her album Süper Star 2 (1979). The song "Karar Ver", inspired by the pop songs of the 1980s, was described by critics as the album's best song. The second disc begins by the song "Hani Bana", written and composed by Mert Ekren. "Alt Dudak", "Hani Bana" and the other piece composed by Erken, "Naber", which includes a melody with syllabic prosody, are the songs for which separate music videos were made and released. The song "Mükemmel" was created after Yener and her team spent time in the studio looking for an ambitious name for the album they were preparing. The only song in the album that was written by Yener herself is "O Kadın Gitti".

On the album's cover, which was taken by Tayfun Çetinkaya, Yener wore a golden gilded outfit and posed with her yellow hair. In one of the album's promotional concerts in Bursa, she wore the same outfit and her weight gain became a subject of many tabloid news. Later, Akşam reported that the outfit was similar to the one used by Rihanna in the music video for her song "Rude Boy" (Rated R, 2009). Yavuz Hakan Tok criticized the album's cover and photographs by saying that "Yener's messy and sloppy image, which was intended to be different and frivolous, turned out to be funny and meaningless". He also wrote that the album booklet could be much more ambitious.

== Critical reception ==
Mükemmel received generally positive reviews from music critics. Some critics praised Yener's innovations in this album. Hürriyet's Sadi Tirak believed that the album had the "classic Hande Yener concept" and was "pretty good based on normal Turkish pop standards!" Hikmet Demirkol from the same newspaper described Mükemmel as "a work that clearly shows Hande Yener with a new and different atmosphere". Naim Dilmener, however, believed that the album had not made "as much noise as expected". Hayat Müzik's critic, Yavuz Hakan Tok, wrote that the album was "one of the best pop albums in recent times" and believed that Mükemmel could be "a breath of fresh air that could change the infertile cycle of Turkish pop and open new paths for new experiments". He also wrote that Yener seemed to have stopped moving on "the curve of decline on which she had stuck for years".

Dikkat Müzik's Olcay Tanberken believed that Yener's decision to stop working with Sinan Akçıl was "a development good enough that have to be celebrated with a big party". He also added: "We don't hesitate in adding this album to our archives as it will surely delight the artist's fans in terms of being a guide for her next step." Writing for Dilimin Ayarı Yok, Cem Özsancak believed that Yener should not be criticized anymore and said: "We have a singer in front of us who wants to do whatever her instincts tell her and bring the colors inside her to life. In this sense, I liked Mükemmel in general. My only criticism is that eight remix versions are too much for an album." Mükemmel received the Best Album award at the Düzce University Media Awards, Magazinci.com Awards, and Magazin Journalists Association's Golden Objective Awards.

== Promotion ==
=== Live performances ===
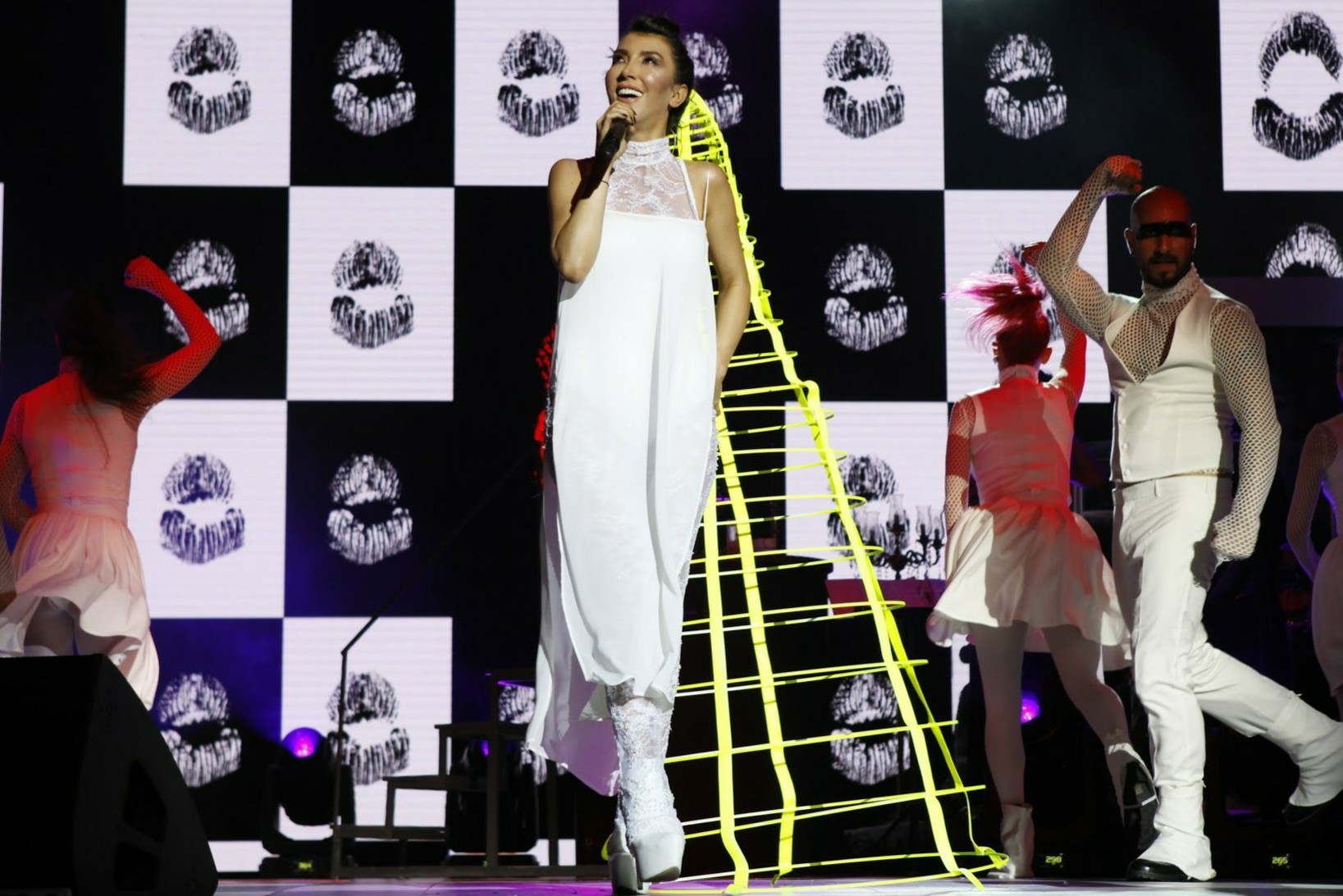
Yener performing "Alt Dudak" at the Cemil Topuzlu Open-Air Theatre, July 2015

To promote Mükemmel, Hande Yener gave various concerts and appeared on a number of television programs. On 12 June 2014, she appeared as Juliet in the season finale of Arkadaşım Hoşgeldin and performed her songs "Alt Dudak" and "Kaybol". On 20 December, she joined Show TV's program Bu Tarz Benim as a guest judge and performed the songs "Alt Dudak" and "Naber". At the special new year's program on the same channel, Yener performed the songs "Bileti Kes", "Hani Bana" and "Karar Ver". On 3 April 2015, she appeared on Beyaz Show and performed the songs "Naber" and "Yangın (Çağın Kulaçoğlu Remix)". Aside from her appearance on television programs, Yener finished 2014 with 170 concerts and, in 2015, went on the Sebastian 2015 Tour and gave various concerts in different cities of Turkey and Europe.

=== Music videos ===
Mükemmel's first music video was prepared for the album's lead single "Alt Dudak" and was released on 2 June 2014. The music video was directed by Hasan Kuyucu. It was nominated for the Best Music Video award at the Golden Butterfly Awards and Kral Turkey Music Awards. Yener appeared alongside her boyfriend Ozan Öğüt in the video. The song ranked second on Turkey's official music chart. The song "Naber", which ranked third on the official music chart for two weeks, was the second song for which a music video was released. The third music video was made and released for "Hani Bana". In both of these music videos, footage from Yener's concerts at the Cemil Topuzlu Open-Air Theatre were used. In the first video, footage from Yener's concerts on 25 August 2014 was used, while for the second one parts of her concert on 31 July 2015 were included in the video. The music videos were released on 15 September 2014 and 17 August 2015 respectively. Additionally, a remixed version of "Naber" was prepared by French DJ David Vendetta. This remix was released as a single on 28 October 2014. "Naber" also became the fourth most-searched song on Google in Turkey in 2014.

== Sebastian + Mükemmel ==
Yener was featured on Berksan's single "Haberi Var mı?", which was released in September. She also performed the songs "Sebastian" and "Eve Nasıl Geldim" for Volga Tamöz's album No. 2, which was released in March 2015. "Sebastian" ranked first on Turkey's official music charts for three consecutive weeks. On 27 April 2015, the song "Haberi Var mı?" together with Yener's two songs from Tamöz's album were released together with Mükemmel under a three-disc edition titled Sebastian + Mükemmel. Additionally, many of the songs in Mükemmel were again released on 4 December 2015 in a compilation album titled İki Deli.

== Track listing ==
Disc 1
No.	Title	Writer(s)	Composer(s)	Length
1.	"Alt Dudak"	Altan Çetin	Çetin	4:34
2.	"Sokak Kedisi"	Çetin	Çetin	3:30
3.	"Herkes Yoluna"	Berksan	Berksan	3:07
4.	"Kaybol"	Çetin	Çetin	3:40
5.	"Bileti Kes"	Çetin	Çetin	3:15
6.	"Unutanlar Gibi" (duet with Mehmet Erdem)	Berksan	Berksan · Turaç Berkay Özer	5:05
7.	"Bir Kış Masalı"	Yıldırım Türker	Onno Tunç	4:28
8.	"Karar Ver"	Berksan	Volga Tamöz	4:08
9.	"Alt Dudak" (Mert Hakan Remix)	Çetin	Çetin	4:12
10.	"Sokak Kedisi" (Cihat Uğurel Remix)	Çetin	Çetin	4:07
11.	"Hani Bana" (Nurettin Çolak - Levent Lodos Remix)	Mert Ekren	Ekren	4:22
12.	"Yangın" (Çağın Kulaçoğlu Remix)	Berksan	Berksan	4:59
Total length:				49:27

Disc 2
No.	Title	Writer(s)	Composer(s)	Length
1.	"Hani Bana"	Ekren	Ekren	3:47
2.	"Tebdil-i Aşk"	Çetin	Çetin	4:11
3.	"Naber"	Ekren	Ekren	3:18
4.	"Yangın"	Berksan	Berksan	4:02
5.	"İyi Şanslar"	Ekren	Ekren	4:13
6.	"Mükemmel"	Berksan	Tamöz	4:39
7.	"O Kadın Gitti"	Hande Yener	Berksan	3:45
8.	"Bir Köşede Yalnız"	Fikret Şeneş	Peter Yellowstone · Steven John Voice	3:21
9.	"Alt Dudak" (Kaan Gökman Remix)	Çetin	Çetin	4:24
10.	"Alt Dudak" (Cemre Burak Remix)	Çetin	Çetin	4:35
11.	"Alt Dudak" (Barış Mert Peker Remix)	Çetin	Çetin	4:09
12.	"Alt Dudak" (Cihat Uğurel Remix)	Çetin	Çetin	5:08
Total length:				49:32

Sebastian + Mükemmel – Disc 1
No.	Title	Writer(s)	Composer(s)	Length
1.	"Sebastian"	Ersay Üner	Volga Tamöz	2:53
2.	"Eve Nasıl Geldim" (duet with Berksan)	Berksan	Volga Tamöz	3:04
3.	"Haberi Var mı?" (duet with Berksan)	Berksan	Talib Kuliev	3:19
Total length:				9:16

Sebastian + Mükemmel – Disc 2
No.	Title	Length
1.	"Alt Dudak"	4:34
2.	"Sokak Kedisi"	3:30
3.	"Herkes Yoluna"	3:07
4.	"Kaybol"	3:40
5.	"Bileti Kes"	3:15
6.	"Unutanlar Gibi" (duet with Mehmet Erdem)	5:05
7.	"Bir Kış Masalı"	4:28
8.	"Karar Ver"	4:08
9.	"Alt Dudak" (Mert Hakan Remix)	4:12
10.	"Sokak Kedisi" (Cihat Uğurel Remix)	4:07
11.	"Hani Bana" (Nurettin Çolak - Levent Lodos Remix)	4:22
12.	"Yangın" (Çağın Kulaçoğlu Remix)	4:59
Total length:		49:27

Sebastian + Mükemmel – Disc 3
No.	Title	Length
1.	"Hani Bana"	3:47
2.	"Tebdil-i Aşk"	4:11
3.	"Naber"	3:18
4.	"Yangın"	4:02
5.	"İyi Şanslar"	4:13
6.	"Mükemmel"	4:39
7.	"O Kadın Gitti"	3:45
8.	"Bir Köşede Yalnız"	3:21
9.	"Alt Dudak" (Kaan Gökman Remix)	4:24
10.	"Alt Dudak" (Cemre Burak Remix)	4:35
11.	"Alt Dudak" (Barış Mert Peker Remix)	4:09
12.	"Alt Dudak" (Cihat Uğurel Remix)	5:08
Total length:		49:32

== Personnel ==
- Hande Yener – main vocals, songwriter, backing vocals, supervisor, fx vocals
- Altan Çetin – songwriter, composer, backing vocals
- Berksan – songwriter, composer, fx vocals
- Mert Ekren – songwriter, composer, bass guitar
- Volga Tamöz – composer, arranger, moxing, fx vocals, backing vocals
- Turaç Berkay Özer – composer, clavier
- Yıldırım Türker – songwriter
- Onno Tunç – composer
- Fikret Şeneş – songwriter
- Peter Yellowstone – composer
- Steven John Voice – composer
- Emrah Karaduman – arranger, backing vocals, intro melody, mixing
- Polat Yağcı – producer
- Caner Güneysu – classic guitar, acoustic guitar
- Gültekin Kaçar – acoustic guitar, electro guitar
- Birkan Şener – bass gitar
- Martin Gusty – guitar
- Gündem Yaylı Grubu – bowed string instruments
- İstanbul Strings – yaylılar
- William Richart Cardoso Gonzales – percussion
- Cengiz Ercümer – percussion
- Eyüp Hamiş – ney
- Ertan Tekin – balaban
- Şenol Arkın – cello
- Ali Yılmaz – acoustic bağlama
- Gürtuğ Gök – tenor, soprano saxophone
- Işık Üstündağ – tenor trombone
- Mert Can Oktav – trumpet
- Tufan Taş – recording, arrangement, mixing
- Utku Ünsal – recording
- Ümit Kuzer – recording
- Tarık Ceran – mixing, mastering
- Emre Kıral – mixing, mastering
- Miles Showell (Abbey Road Studios) – mastering
- Mert Hakan – arranger
- Cihat Uğurel – arranger
- Çağın Kulaçoğlu – arranger
- Nurettin Çolak – arranger
- Levent Lodos – arranger
- Kaan Gökman – arranger
- Cemre Burak – arranger
- Barış Mert Peker – arranger
- Selim Akar – brand, PR
- Tayfun Çetinkaya – photographs

Credits adapted from Mükemmel's album booklet.

== Charts ==
Chart (2014)	Peak position
Turkey (D&R Best-Selling)	3
Turkey (Esenshop Best-Selling)	1

== Sales ==
Country	Satış/gönderi
Mükemmel
Turkey (MÜ-YAP)	50,000
Sebastian + Mükemmel
Turkey (MÜ-YAP)	29,700

== Release history ==
Country	Date	Format(s)	Label	Ref.
Mükemmel
Turkey	2 June 2014	CD · digital download	Poll Production	
Worldwide	2 June 2014	Digital download	Poll Production	
Sebastian + Mükemmel
Turkey	29 April 2015	CD	Poll Production	
