= Sen Yoluna... Ben Yoluma... =

Studio album by Hande Yener
- Released: 17 July 2002
- Recorded: 2001–2002
- Genre: Pop, fantasy
- Length: 77:53
- Label: Erol Köse

Hande Yener chronology
| Extra (2001) | Sen Yoluna... Ben Yoluma... (2002) | Aşk Kadın Ruhundan Anlamıyor (2004) |

Sen Yoluna... Ben Yoluma... (You Go Your Way... I'll Go Mine...) is the second studio album by Turkish singer Hande Yener. It was released on 17 July 2002 by Erol Köse Exclusive. The album was Yener's first major work since the release of her first studio album Senden İbaret. As of 2013, Poll Production has acquired the rights for publishing the album.

The album was first her first work published by Erol Köse Exclusive. For her previous album, she had mainly worked with Altan Çetin, while for this one she collaborated with Alper Narman and Fettah Can. Yener also re-performed a new version of the song "Duyduk Duymadık Demeyin" for this album. It was originally performed by Özdemir Erdoğan and written by Sezen Cumhur Önal.

The album's first music video was released for the song "Sen Yoluna... Ben Yoluma...", followed by three other music videos for the songs "Şansın Bol Olsun", "Evlilik Sandalı" and "Küs". The successful promotions together with the release of music videos made Hande Yener's second studio album one of the best-selling works of the year. It received two different awards at the Kral TV Video and Music Awards, organized by Kral TV. After selling 1,000,000 copies, the album received a platinum certification at the MÜ-YAP Music Awards. The songs in this album were performed by Yener at numerous award ceremonies, including Kral TV Video and Music Awards, and also on Star TV's program Hande Yener Show, which was presented by Yener herself.

== Background and recording ==
After the release of her debut studio album, some critics commented that Yener was an artist performing only one type of song. She responded to the criticism by saying: "Time will show them the facts. I will never be an artist with one type of song!". Meanwhile, it was reported that she had started working on her second studio album.

== Music videos ==
The first music video of the album was made for the dance version of the song "Sen Yoluna... Ben Yoluma..." and released on 17 July 2002. In the video, Yener appeared with a new image and two actors accompanied her. The album's second music video, "Şansın Bol Olsun", was released on 31 October 2002. The video was taken by a crowded team at a bar. Four months after the release of "Şansın Bol Olsun", the third music video, "Evlilik Sandalı", was released on 18 February 2003. A male model appeared alongside Yener in the video, and she went in front of the camera in a wedding dress. Later on 2 June 2003, the album's fourth and last music video, "Küs", was released. The music video was directed by Nihat Odabaşı and recorded at a beach.

== Critical reception ==
Professional ratings
Review scores
| Source | Rating |
|---|---|
| Michael Show | (favorable) |

Sen Yoluna... Ben Yoluma... received positive reviews from music critics and radiomen. Radio personality Michael Kuyucu gave a positive review for the album and stated: "Hande Yener proved that she is not an artist with only one type of song. [...] Yener, who made an excellent debut in her first solo work and almost became a pop star, has shown the same success in her second solo work."

== Track listing ==
| No. | Title | Writer(s) | Composer(s) | Length |
|---|---|---|---|---|
| 1. | "Şansın Bol Olsun" | Alper Narman, Fettah Can | Murat Yeter | 4:01 |
| 2. | "Duyduk Duymadık Demeyin" | Sezen Cumhur Önal | Murat Yeter | 3:36 |
| 3. | "Sen Yoluna... Ben Yoluma..." | Altan Çetin | Altan Çetin, Özgür Yedievli | 5:18 |
| 4. | "Yanmışız" | Onur Mete, Hande Yener | Selim Çaldıran | 4:29 |
| 5. | "Üzgünüm O Kadın Ben Değilim (Ü.O.K.B.D.)" | Alper Narman, Fettah Can | Alper Erinç | 3:51 |
| 6. | "Küs" | Alper Narman, Fettah Can | Ozan Çolakoğlu | 4:12 |
| 7. | "Evlilik Sandalı" | Alper Narman, Fettah Can | Selim Çaldıran | 4:38 |
| 8. | "Elin Diline Sakız Ederim" | Alper Narman, Fettah Can | Murat Yeter | 3:43 |
| 9. | "Sözün Söz müdür?" | Alper Narman, Fettah Can | Murat Yeter | 4:29 |
| 10. | "Hadi Geçmiş Olsun" | Alper Narman, Fettah Can | Alper Erinç | 4:28 |
| 11. | "Mendil" | Altan Çetin | Altan Çetin, Özgür Yedievli | 4:27 |
| 12. | "32 Kısım" | Alper Narman, Fettah Can | Murat Yeter | 3:30 |
| 13. | "Bakarım Keyfime" | Alper Narman, Fettah Can | Özgür Buldum | 3:08 |
| 14. | "Bana Olanlar" | Alper Narman, Fettah Can | Sinan Akçıl | 2:57 |
| 15. | "Kazanamadık" | Alper Narman, Fettah Can | Murat Yeter | 3:40 |
| 16. | "Sen Yoluna... Ben Yoluma... (Dance Version)" | Altan Çetin | Altan Çetin, Özgür Yedievli | 4:51 |
| 17. | "Duyduk Duymadık Demeyin (Alaturka Version)" | Sezen Cumhur Önal | Murat Yeter | 3:47 |
| 18. | "Yanmışız (Oud Version)" | Onur Mete, Hande Yener | Selim Çaldıran | 4:45 |
| 19. | "Yanmışız (Greco-Latin)" | Onur Mete, Hande Yener | Selim Çaldıran | 4:11 |
| Total length: | | | | 77:53 |

== Personnel ==
Credits adapted from Sen Yoluna... Ben Yoluma...'s album booklet.

- Erol Köse Exclusive - production, press and public relations, distribution
- Erol Köse - producer
- Hande Yener - vocals, songwriter
- Altan Çetin - songwriter, composer, arranger
- Onur Mete - songwriter, composer
- Alper Narman - songwriter, composer
- Fettah Can - songwriter, composer
- Sezen Cumhur Önal - songwriter
- Vasilis Vasileiadis - composer
- Özgür Yedievli - arranger
- Alper Erinç - arranger
- Çağlar Türkmen- mastering
- Erdinç Şenyaylar - guitar, bouzouki, oud
- Murat Yeter - arranger
- Selim Çaldıran - arranger
- Yaşar Akpençe - rhythm
- Cihan Okan - backing vocals
- Sinan Akçıl - arranger
- Grup Gündem - violin
- Hüsnü Şenlendirici - clarinet, trumpet
- Yeşim Vatan - backing vocals
- Ozan Çolakoğlu - arranger
- Sibel Gürsoy - backing vocals
- Cengiz Ercümer - rhythm, percussion
- Mehmet Akatay - rhythm, percussion
- Erdem Sökmen - guitar
- Ercan Irmak - ney
- Ercüment Vural - backing vocals
- Murat Boz - backing vocals
- Aytaç Mısırlı - qanun
- Seyfi Ayta - percussion
- Göksel Kartal - qanun
- Yıldıran Güz - oud
- Kirpi Bülent - clarinet
- Berna Keser - backing vocals
- Özer Özel - Turkish tambur
- Bekir Ünlüataer - backing vocals
- Kadir Verim - kemenche
- Tolga Görsev - electro guitar, backing vocals
- Özcan Şenyaylar - violin
- Sevim Yiğit - backing vocals
- Aylin Şenyaylar - backing vocals
- Türker Dinletir - ney
- Murat Ejder - bass guitar
- Kadir Okyay - string instruments group
- Şaban Gölge - string instruments groups
- Sevim, Adnan, Nida - backing vocals
- Nihat Odabaşı - photographs
- Sanart - graphics
- FRS Matbaacılık - printing
