= Hande Yener =

Turkish singer and songwriter (born 1973)

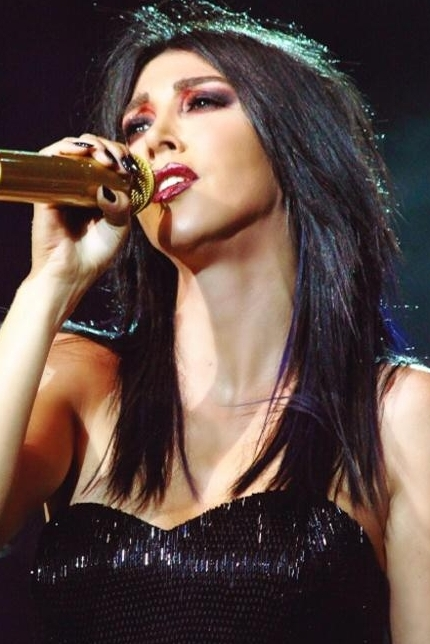
- Yener performing at the Cemil Topuzlu Open-Air Theatre, August 2014
- Born: Makbule Hande Özyener; 12 January 1973 (age 53); Kadıköy, Istanbul, Turkey
- Education: Erenköy Girls High School (left)
- Occupations: Singer; songwriter
- Spouse: Uğur Kulaçoğlu (m. 1990; div. 1994)
- Children: 1
- Musical career
- Genres: Dance; electropop; pop
- Instrument: Vocals
- Years active: 1994–present
- Labels: DMC; Erol Köse; Avrupa; Poll

Makbule Hande Özyener (born 12 January 1973), known professionally as Hande Yener, is a Turkish singer and songwriter. She made her debut in the early 2000s, and since then has become a prominent figure of Turkish pop music with numerous songs that topped the music charts. Alongside her music career, she is also known for her choice of clothes and has renewed her image multiple times over the years. She has occasionally made changes in her music style as well; for a while, she started making electronic music, but this period was short-lived and she again returned to performing pop music. During her career, both her professional and personal life have been among the favorite subjects of columnists, and her rivalry and on and off feud with Demet Akalın were covered in the tabloids from time to time.

Yener was born in Kadıköy, Istanbul. After finishing her middle school she decided to go to a conservatory, but after facing objections from her family, she enrolled in Erenköy Girls High School. She left the school while in the second grade and got married. To achieve her dream of becoming a singer, she tried to get in contact with Sezen Aksu, and while she was working as a shop assistant she met Hülya Avşar who later introduced her to Aksu. She worked as Aksu's backing vocalist for a while, before working with Altan Çetin who helped her with preparing her first studio album, Senden İbaret, which was released in 2000. She later released the MÜ-YAP certificated album Sen Yoluna... Ben Yoluma... (2002), followed by Aşk Kadın Ruhundan Anlamıyor (2004) and Apayrı (2006). These albums made her one of the successful artists inside Turkey in the 2000s. With the album Nasıl Delirdim? (2007), she shifted her style to electronic music and distanced herself from pop music for a while. During this period, which formed the first decade of her career, many of her songs became hits, including "Yalanın Batsın", "Sen Yoluna... Ben Yoluma...", "Acele Etme", "Kırmızı", "Kelepçe", "Aşkın Ateşi", "Kibir" and "Romeo".

Although Yener's electronic songs received critical praise, she suffered commercial loss compared to her previous works, which resulted in several problems with her producing partners, causing a change in the production company and label twice. Hence, Yener's era of electronic music ended in a few years and with the pop album Hande'ye Neler Oluyor? (2010) she returned to pop music charts. The pop albums released in this phase of her career were often compared to her initial albums, and although they received mixed reviews in general, many of their songs, especially those from Mükemmel (2014) and Hepsi Hit Vol. 1 and Vol. 2 (2016–17) topped the music charts in Turkey. Among these songs were "Bodrum", "Ya Ya Ya Ya", "Naber", "Sebastian", "Mor", "Bakıcaz Artık" and "Beni Sev".

Throughout her career, Yener has been influenced by a number of artists, including Madonna to whom her image, clips and performances were often compared. In the 2000s, she was one of the few artists who had an album that sold over 1 million copies in Turkey. In 2013, she was the Turkish singer whose music videos were viewed the most on YouTube. By the end of the 2000s, she was known as a gay icon inside Turkey, and made some statements demanding the advancement of LGBT rights in Turkey, but she became the target of criticism after being silent about LGBT issues in the following years. In the second half of the 2010s, she expanded the scope of her work and worked periodically as the operator of various night clubs. Yener has received five Golden Butterfly Awards, as well as four Kral Turkey Music Awards and has received various other awards and nominations.

== Life and career ==
=== 1973–99: Early life and career beginnings ===
"I used to think that I couldn't make music. That is why I decided to form a family instead. Then I started to have a crisis during my marriage. I started asking myself a question, 'why am I unhappy?' I loved working in the store, but nothing would reduce my energy. I had to do more, I've always had this energy inside me and limiting it had made me sad. When I was home, I would start to be an unhappy person. So I spoke to my then-husband, my son's father. He reacted in a normal way, and said 'do it'"

— Yener's explanation about her situation before becoming famous.

Makbule Hande Özyener was born on 12 January 1973 in Kadıköy, Istanbul. She is the younger of Yıldız Yazıcı (c. 1942 – 16 March 2024) and Erol Özyener's (1934 – 30 December 2012) two daughters, being five years younger than her elder sister. Her first name was chosen as Makbule, after her paternal grandmother. She had an economically moderate family. Her mother, Yıldız, was a housewife, while her father, Erol, worked as a professional football player for a while, and later worked at Ford Otosan. Yener grew up in Erenköy, Kadıköy, and since an early age made it known that she wished to become a singer. After finishing middle school, she decided to go to a conservatory, but faced objections from her family, who sent her to Erenköy Girls High School instead. She left the school at the second grade, about which she later said: "My citizenship teacher was obsessed with me, on top of that I hated literature, I didn't even go to the exam sessions. My music grades were always 10 though." After her father fell ill with alcoholism, her parents divorced when she was 17 years old, and Yener later said that it caused her "great sufferings". She married customs broker Uğur Kulaçoğlu in 1990 in Fatih. In the same year, her son Çağın was born in October. As she got older, Yener and her husband Uğur began to have disagreements on various issues. The couple eventually divorced in 1994.

During this period, she began to meet music mentor Erdem Siyavuşgil, who said that she had the potential of becoming a soloist. Yener later began to take singing lessons and made numerous efforts to get in contact with Sezen Aksu. Subsequently, she began working as a sales representative at the Mudo store in Suadiye, knowing that many artists would pass by the store, and that way she could "reach Aksu through the celebrities" who would shop in the store. She later found Aksu's phone number, and left her notes everyday, asking her for a chance to become her backing vocalist, but did not receive any response. Many singers who came to the store, including Nilüfer, Şehrazat and Sertab Erener, left her wish for contacting Aksu unanswered. Yener started to lose her hope of becoming a singer, until she met Hülya Avşar, who promised her that she would make an appointment for her with Aksu. In April 1993, Yener met Aksu through Avşar's help, and performed the songs "Yalnızlık Senfonisi" and "Oyun Bitti" for Aksu during the meeting. After winning Aksu's favor, she began working for her and for two years served as her backing vocalist and assistant. In December 1994, she made her television debut as a vocalist in Cem Özer's program Laf Lafı Açıyor. To work in bars, she stopped working for Aksu and for a number of years performed at various places in Turkey. To prepare her first album, she contacted Aksu again and started the preparation process. With Aksu's recommendation, she signed a contract with DMC.

=== 2000–03: Senden İbaret and Sen Yoluna... Ben Yoluma... ===
Hande Yener's first studio album Senden İbaret was produced by Ercan Saatçi and released by DMC on 31 May 2000. Thus Yener became the first female vocalist introduced to the market by DMC. The album's preparations lasted for a year, and its songs were written by Altan Çetin. Yener described the album's style as "neither Western nor Arabesque, just Turkish pop". Various Turkish newspapers started making predictions about the outcome of her collaboration with Altan Çetin, a well-known songwriter who had previously worked with İzel. Columnists said that Yener would "sit on İzel's throne", in response to which Yener said that she was different from İzel. Yener also made it clear that the album was initially meant to be prepared for İzel, but after she got into troubles with DMC, the original project was set aside. Senden İbaret's lead single "Yalanın Batsın", became the first song for which a music video was released. The song became a hit inside Turkey in summer 2000 and successfully topped the music charts. Yener herself was surprised with the outcome saying: "I believed that I would succeed. But I was really surprised and immensely happy with the rapid development of everything." Hürriyet wrote that Yener had made a great debut and named her as one of the shining stars of the year. Following the release of a music video for "Yalanın Batsın", separate clips were also released for "Bunun Adı Ayrılık" and "Yoksa Mani". Yener was put in danger of freezing while filming the music video for "Bunun Adı Ayrılık". In 2000, she won the Best Newcomer award at the Golden Butterfly Awards, and the music video for "Yalanın Batsın" was awarded with the Best Music Video award together with Candan Erçetin's music video for "Elbette". At the award ceremony organized by Akademik Bakış magazine and later at the 2001 Kral TV Video Music Awards, Yener received the Best Female Newcomer award. Magazin Journalists Association chose her as the Promising Female Singer. Yener also appeared in the album Türk Marşları, prepared by Gendarmerie General Command together with Turkish pop singers and released at the end of 2000. She performed the song "Biz Atatürk Gençleriyiz" in the album. For her first EP, Extra, which was released in 2001, she included new versions of the songs from her first studio album Senden İbaret. Meanwhile, she made a guest appearance in one of the episodes of Show TV's series Dadı.

In the early 2002, Yener began a relationship with basketball player Kemal Tunçeri. She also appeared in the commercials for Ülker's Petit-Beurre. In February 2001, Yener announced that she was working on a new album, and her second studio album Sen Yoluna... Ben Yoluma... was released in July by Erol Köse Production. Radioman Michael Kuyucu praised the album by describing it as "a perfect work by Yener, who showed the same success again", while Milliyet's Naim Dilmener also noted that the album had made "a big noise" in the market upon its release as if it "has brought together the works of all the prominent female Turkish pop singers in one place". "Sen Yoluna... Ben Yoluma..." became a hit and following the release of a music video for it, the songs "Şansın Bol Olsun", "Evlilik Sandalı" and "Küs" were turned into music videos as well. The album sold more than one million copies and received a platinum certification from MÜ-YAP. At the 2003 Kral TV Video Music Awards, Hande Yener won the Best Female Pop Artist award, and Sen Yoluna... Ben Yoluma... was awarded as the Best-Selling Album. Magazine Journalists Association also chose "Sen Yoluna... Ben Yoluma..." as the Song of the Year. In 2017, Hürriyet's music critics published a list of Turkey's Best 100 Albums, on which Sen Yoluna... Ben Yoluma... ranked 81st. During that period, Yener played in the commercials for Filli Boya in June 2002, and in July presented one episode of the TV program Pazar Keyfi. From March to June 2003, she presented her own TV program Hande Yener Show on Star TV. In the same year, she dated businessman Moris Kohen for a while.

=== 2004–06: Aşk Kadın Ruhundan Anlamıyor and Apayrı ===
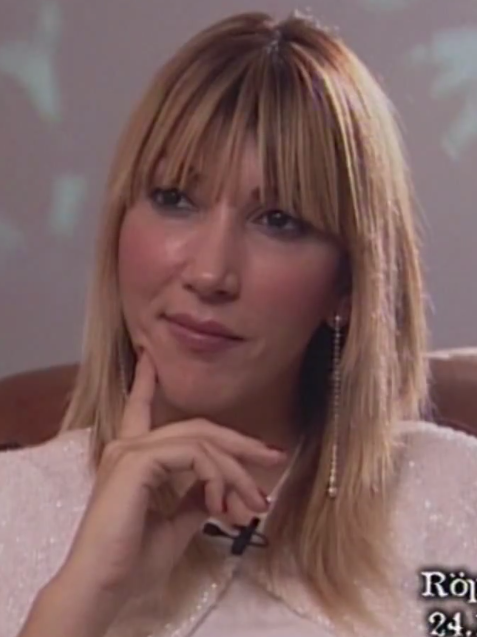
Yener during an interview with Müzik Dergisi in December 2004

Yener's third studio album was recorded in Hamburg and Istanbul, and was released under the title Aşk Kadın Ruhundan Anlamıyor in July 2004 by Erol Köse Production. Yener later said that she had become more professional while working on this album and "I listen to the songs while being played by guitar with all my soul and feelings, as a listener. If I like it myself, I'll give it a thumbs-up. I mean, questions like 'Does it become a hit, how much will it sell?' do not pop up in my head. I don't put myself in the mindset that we are preparing this album for Hande Yener. The team also worked with the same energy, very intensely, everyone put their most precious and valuable songs together for this album. All the songs they made were very successful and they were songs that could be considered classic in terms of quality. They just gave me the songs that matched with my style." The album was well-received and found successful by music critics. The hit songs "Acele Etme", "Kırmızı" and "Acı Veriyor" were all turned into music videos, followed by separate clips for "Armağan", "Hoşgeldiniz" and "Bu Yüzden". "Acele Etme", "Kırmızı" and "Acı Veriyor" became number-one hits on many radio's music lists. Aşk Kadın Ruhundan Anlamıyor sold 400,000 copies in 2004, and received a gold certification from MÜ-YAP. At an award ceremony organized by İstanbul FM, the album received the Golden Album award. From 20 to 21 August 2005, Yener gave concerts at Rumelihisarı with the help of Italian dancer and director Luca Tommassini.

For her fourth studio album, Yener chose "songs that were in harmony with her voice." The album, titled Apayrı, was released by Erol Köse Production in January 2006. Yener classified the album as an alternative pop album, and later discussed her change of music style in this album: "Some people are made unhappy when doing something new, they don't like it or think they don't need it. But in my opinion, my job is a work that requires change. As the technology progresses, the sound effects also change so quickly, it was indispensable that I had to be part of this change. I stand behind every album that I've ever made, but it's not possible to develop by making similar things again and again. The albums and clips I've made so far have caused surprise at first and then they have been accepted." Some critics described the album as a turning point in Yener's career and, compared to her previous albums, found European elements inside her new works, categorizing the album as not only a pop album, but also an album that consists of house, R&B, and rock songs as well. Some music critics reacted negatively to Yener's style change, while others found it successful. Hürriyet's Tolga Akyıldız said that the album was based on the Western dance infrastructure. "Kelepçe", "Aşkın Ateşi" and "Kim Bilebilir Aşkı" were the songs from this album for which separate music videos were released. Apayrı sold 165,000 copies in 2006 and received a gold certification from MÜ-YAP. Apayrı won the Best Album award at the 2007 PowerTürk Music Awards. NTV later named Aşk Kadın Ruhundan Anlamıyor and Apayrı as the two of Turkey's best albums in the 2000s. In September 2006, Yener released another version of Apayrı in the form of an EP titled Hande Maxi. The song "Biraz Özgürlük" from this EP was turned into a music video, and received the Best Music Video award at the 2007 Kral TV Video Music Awards.

=== 2007–09: Nasıl Delirdim?, Hipnoz and Hayrola? ===
Following Eurovision Song Contest 2007, the TRT committee contacted producer Erol Köse, asking him to clarify whether he's open to having Yener represent Turkey at the Eurovision Song Contest 2008, to which he agreed. After a while, the TRT announced that no bid was offered to anyone for the contest. Yener's producer Erol Köse said in a press release that the singer had received a preliminary offer to join the Eurovision from TRT, but as he had hastily reacted and announced it before TRT, they denied that they had given him such offer. Köse added that they had then rejected the informal proposal for Eurovision following the earlier events.

In May 2007, Yener's fifth studio album Nasıl Delirdim? was released. 72,000 copies were pre-ordered before its release, and Yener changed her music style to the electronic music with this album. Her transition from pop to electronic music brought out some negative reviews. She responded to the criticism by saying: "To make everyone happy is so hard, even impossible. It is not the right thing to do something that pleases everyone. First of all you need to please yourself and show your music quality. It doesn't really appeal to me to do something that's produced and consumed instantly." Music website Gerçek Pop gave the album 5 out of 5, and some critics gave positive reviews for the album. The song "Kibir (Yanmam Lazım)", written and composed by Sezen Aksu, was chosen as the album's lead single and a music video was released for it. The second music video was released for the song "Romeo", which was written for her then-boyfriend Kadir Doğulu, and he also appeared in the music video. Both of these songs became hits and topped music charts in Turkey. Just like the two previous albums, Nasıl Delirdim? was chosen by NTV as one of Turkey's best albums in the 2000s. İstanbul FM awarded the album as the Best Pop Album by a Female Artist. In August 2007, Yener became engaged to Kadir Doğulu.

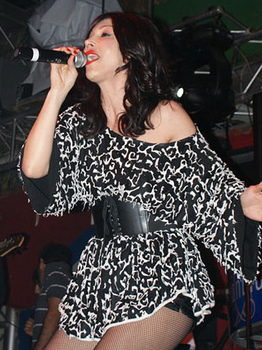
Yener during a performance in Marmaris, 2009

In 2007, Yener had an argument with various other singers after she used the term "grocery music" and her name started to appear in court cases and lawsuits. Due to these arguments, her feud with Demet Akalın started and their fight became among the hot topic of tabloids for years. After being compared to Akalın in an interview, Yener made a response which eventually started the feud and said: "I do Western music, so I can not compete with those who make fantasy music. What Demet does is not similar to my style." Akalın continued the argument by saying: "If she does not like me, why is she after my works? It is obvious that she takes all the works that I don't like or refuse to do for herself." Yener subsequently took a case to the court asking for ₺50,000 on the grounds that Akalın had insulted her and attacked her verbally, but the court said that they did not find any insult in Akalın's words. Akalın later won ₺10,000 in the court in a case against Yener. At the same time, Serdar Ortaç talked about other singers, saying that he does not prefer "Neither Hande, nor Mustafa [Sandal]! Bengü is the best." to which Yener responded: "I'm not making music only for commercial purposes and I don't make a music that can't be understood. I don't want to be compared to those who make 'grocery music'." Yener's definition of grocery music to describe the songs that she found to be of poor quality came with responses from various people including Akalın, Bengü and Ortaç. Bengü found Yener's statements wrong and said: "If the most popular songs are grocery music based on what she said, then the songs that most probably fall in that category are her own songs." Istanbul Chamber of Groceries also reacted to Yener's statement, but the singer said that her description was only about music and she did not intended to humiliate grocery stores. As the feud and arguments about the grocery music continued to grow, Ortaç made fun of Yener's song "Romeo" at one of his concerts, to which Yener responded by saying, "Serdar needs to find himself a Romeo." Ortaç filed a lawsuit against Yener, stating that her words were implying that he was "gay-homosexual and undermined his personal dignity". He won the case and received ₺3,000 in compensation. Hürriyet chose the phrase 'grocery music' as one of the core words of 2007 and Sırma Karasu from Habertürk described the grocery music debate as one of the breaking points of Turkish pop music and said: "If the local pop has been taken outside of its cliché, it is with no exaggeration to say that it happened thanks to Yener's 2007 album Nasıl Delirdim? and her 'grocery music' polemic. ... Other musicians and singers saw how electronic music applies to our domestic audience thanks to Yener's courage." In later years Erol Köse confessed that he included Bengü in the feud to enhance her reputation and that he planned parts of the feud himself.

In the early 2008, Yener produced Kemal Doğulu's first single "1 Yerde" and also appeared in its music video. She then released the final music video from Nasıl Delirdim? for the song "Yalan Olmasın". She also presented an episode of Show TV's program Pazar Keyfi. In May 2008, her sixth studio album Hipnoz was released by Erol Köse Production. It sold 40,000 copies. During the same period she found the production company TPA (Turkish Pop Alternative) Production together with Kadir Doğulu. All of the songs in Hipnoz were written by Yener herself. Music critics reacted with both positive reviews and negative criticism to the album and wrote that the singer had moved away from pop music in this album. The song "Hipnoz" from the album ranked 10th on Billboard Türkiye's Türkçe Top 20. After the song's music video was released, news surfaced that it had been banned by RTÜK. Yener made it clear that the news were not true and the video had not been banned from radio and TV, describing the situation as a conspiracy against herself. However, the damage was already done and some channels refrained from broadcasting the music video. Later on, a document published by RTÜK revealed that no broadcast ban was applied to the clip. Events before and after this situation, caused Yener to end her contract with her production. As a result of further disputes, she terminated the album contract with the company by paying compensation, so that she left Erol Köse Production in a controversial manner.

On 1 November 2008, Yener signed a new album contract with Avrupa Müzik. In March 2009, her seventh studio album Hayrola? was released. She wrote seven songs in the album by herself, changed her style of writing and performed the songs with a more natural tone. Teoman was featured on the song "Arsız". Music critics found the album as an electronic music album with high quality and more successful than Hipnoz, but said it didn't have a song that could be as successful as "Romeo". According to MÜ-YAP, the album sold 37,000 copies by June 2009. The album's lead single, also titled "Hayrola?", ranked 3rd on Turkey's Official Music Charts and its music video was directed by Kemal Doğulu. The withdrawal of the second music video of the album caused problems between Yener and Avrupa Müzik. Yener issued a warning to the company, saying that the second clip of the album could not be withdrawn, and unilaterally terminated the contract. Avrupa Müzik later took the case to the court and demanded $10,000 from Yener for causing material damages and ₺50,000 for causing moral damages. As a result of the lawsuit, the court decided to pay Yener ₺20,000 from the company together with interest. In late 2009, Yener announced that she had been diagnosed with swine flu and had already prepared a song to leave it behind after her death, but it was later announced that she was getting better. For the 2010 New Year, she appeared on NTV's special program and together with Müslüm Gürses performed the song "Sorma Ne Haldeyim".

=== 2010–13: Hande'ye Neler Oluyor?, Teşekkürler and Kraliçe ===
Hande Yener's announcement at the end of 2009 that she would make pop music again created a sensation in the Turkish press and caused critics to question the decision. Sadi Tirak from Hürriyet attributed her return to pop based on the understanding that she could not make a revolution with her current style. It was later claimed in the news that the reason she had set electronic music aside was due to the falling number of her concerts and album sales. However, Yener said these allegations were put forward by the producers, who aimed to make money, to try to punish her for trying a different style. She said that her return to pop music was because of her love for new changes, and that she had no desire to make an electronic album anymore. While the preparations were being done, in February 2010 she was forced to close her fan website handeyenerfanclub.com, after users began insulting her stylist Kemal Doğulu, which made Doğulu demand that it be closed immediately. Vatan later announced the title of the album's lead single, "Sopa". In April, Yener ended her relationship with her fiancé Kadir Doğulu, whom she had dated since 2006. In the same month, her eighth studio album, which she said she had made for "both listening and playing in the clubs", was released under the title Hande'ye Neler Oluyor? by Poll Production. All of the songs in the album were written by Sinan Akçıl. Music critics mentioned that Yener did not completely return to her old style with the album, and they had both positive and negative reactions to it. To promote the album, Yener appeared on Okan Bayülgen's program Medya Kralı in May 2010, but left it while it was airing live on TV. She later clarified that she left the program because "she could not make herself sing". The album sold 80,000 copies in the year it was released, and two of its songs, "Sopa" and "Bodrum", became hits. On Turkey's Official Music Chart, "Sopa" ranked fourth, while "Bodrum" rose to number one. The album's first music video was released for both the songs "Sopa" and "Yasak Aşk" in a combined format. Following the release of this music video, the songs "Bodrum" and "Çöp" were turned into music videos as well. İstanbul FM awarded "Bodrum" with the Best Lyrics, Song, and Composition award. "Çöp" was nominated for the Best Composition award at the 2011 Kral Music Awards. In September 2010, the remix album Hande'yle Yaz Bitmez was released, which included the remixed version of some of the songs found in Hande'ye Neler Oluyor? and the new song "Uzaylı". "Uzaylı" ranked third on Turkey's Official Music Chart. In December, Yener made a guest appearance in the New Year episode for Star TV's series Geniş Aile.

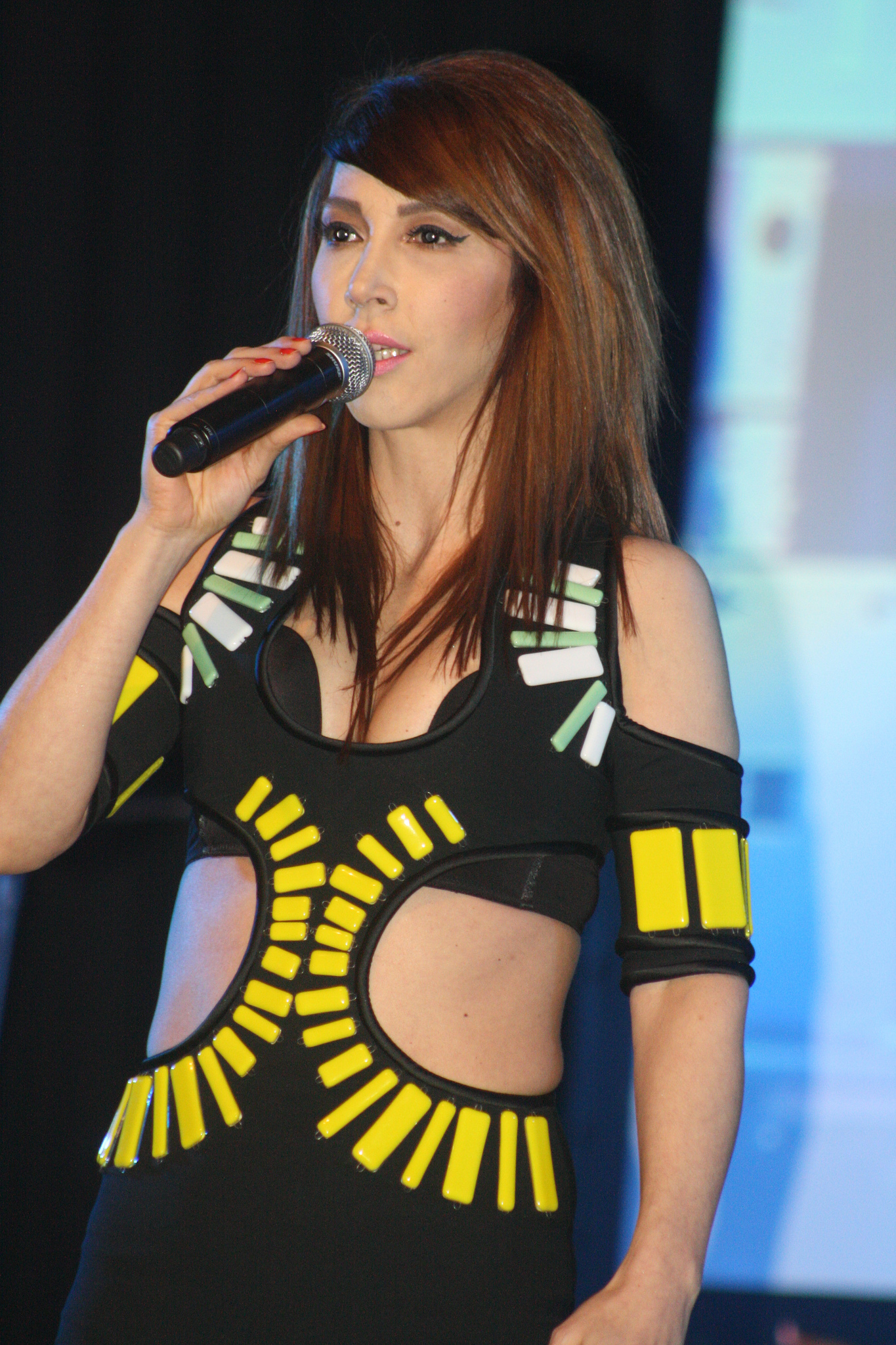
Yener performing at a concert in Dortmund, 2012

In April 2011, Yener appeared as the featured artist on two of Sinan Akçıl's songs from the album Kalp Sesi: "Atma" and "Söndürülmez İstanbul". In June 2011, after receiving the award for the Turkish Female Pop Music Soloist of the Year at the 38th Golden Butterfly Awards, she performed the song "Bana Anlat". The song was in fact part of her ninth studio album Teşekkürler, which was released in September 2011 by Poll Production. Released as a nutshell for her 11th year of career, she said the album's genre was primarily pop. Teşekkürler was released as a result of Yener's experimentation with her style in her earlier projects. All of the songs in the album were written and composed by Sinan Akçıl. Teşekkürler divided the minds of critics into two parts, some of whom described it as far-fetched and commented on how Yener had finally become a musician with a single and distinct style. "Bana Anlat", "Unutulmuyor", "Teşekkürler", "Havaalanı" and "Dön Bana" were the songs from this album for which separate music videos were released. Sinan Akçıl was also featured on the song "Teşekkürler". According to MÜ-YAP, the album sold 59,000 copies in the year it was released.

In March 2012 she played in a commercial for Morhipo together with Demet Akalın. In the commercial, they engage in a competition to reach a new product, while fighting and dragging each other on the floor. In April 2012, together with Seksendört, Yener released a new version of the song "Rüya", originally performed by the group Ünlü. In June, they released the remix album Rüya. "Rüya" was nominated as the Best Duet at the 2013 Turkey Music Awards, and won the Best Cover award at the award ceremony organized by Pal FM. Yener later performed the song "Kaderimin Oyunu" for the album Orhan Gencebay ile Bir Ömür, released in September in honor of Orhan Gencebay's 60th year of career. Her own studio album, Kraliçe, was released on 12 December 2012. All of the album's songs were again written by Sinan Akçıl. Music critics criticized Yener, saying that the singer should do good works again such as the ones found in her previous album. The album's lead single "Hasta", ranked second on Turkey's Official Music Charts and was the first song from the album to get a music video. Kraliçe won the Best Album award at the Mimar Sinan Fine Arts University Academy Awards, and Album of the Year award at the Magazine Awards, and sold 79,000 copies. Yener stopped the album's promotion after her father's death on 30 December 2012, and did not perform anywhere for about two months.

In March 2013, the Ukrainian group Kazaky, invited Yener to their concert in Istanbul by releasing a special video. Yener responded to the invitation by going to the concert and meeting Kazaky at the backstage. In May 2013, she released the single "Ya Ya Ya Ya", which was written by Berksan. "Ya Ya Ya Ya" and its remixed versions, along with remixed songs from the album Kraliçe, were released all together under the title Kraliçe + Ya Ya Ya Ya. "Ya Ya Ya Ya" became the fastest-rising work on Turkey's Official Music Video chart, rising from the 280th place to the first 25 and remained among the top tracks for weeks. The song became the ninth most-downloaded in Turkey in 2013 and the most played song on YouTube inside Turkey. The song also received the Best Single award at the 2014 Turkey Music Awards, and the Best Song and Best Video Clip awards at the 4th Pal FM Music Awards. In November 2013, Yener's mutual single with Volga Tamöz, "Biri Var" was released on Deezer, on the day the service celebrated its launch in Turkey. From 5 October to 17 November 2013, Yener appeared as a judge on ATV's music contest Veliaht, which ended after 6 weeks due to low ratings. The best songs from all of her albums were released under the title Best of Hande Yener in two separate parts by Poll Production, the first of which was released in November 2013, followed by the second one in January 2014.

=== 2014–19: Mükemmel and Hepsi Hit ===
Yener's eleventh studio album Mükemmel was released by Poll Production in June 2014, and sold 50,000 copies in Turkey by the end of the year. Hürriyet's Hikmet Demirkol viewed the album favorably, saying that it had "a new and different atmosphere" in it. Yener worked with Altan Çetin after years for this new album, and the song "Alt Dudak", written by Çetin, ranked second on MusicTopTR Official List and Yener performed it as the character of Juliet in the seasonal final of Arkadaşım Hoşgeldin. After three months of preparations, on 25 August Yener performed at Harbiye's Cemil Topuzlu Open-Air Theatre, and Berksan, Mehmet Erdem and David Vendetta also made appearances on the stage. The videos of this concert, were among Turkey's 2014 Google Trends, and parts of them were used to make the music video for "Naber", which ranked third on MusicTopTR Official List. The third music video from Mükemmel was released for the song "Hani Bana".

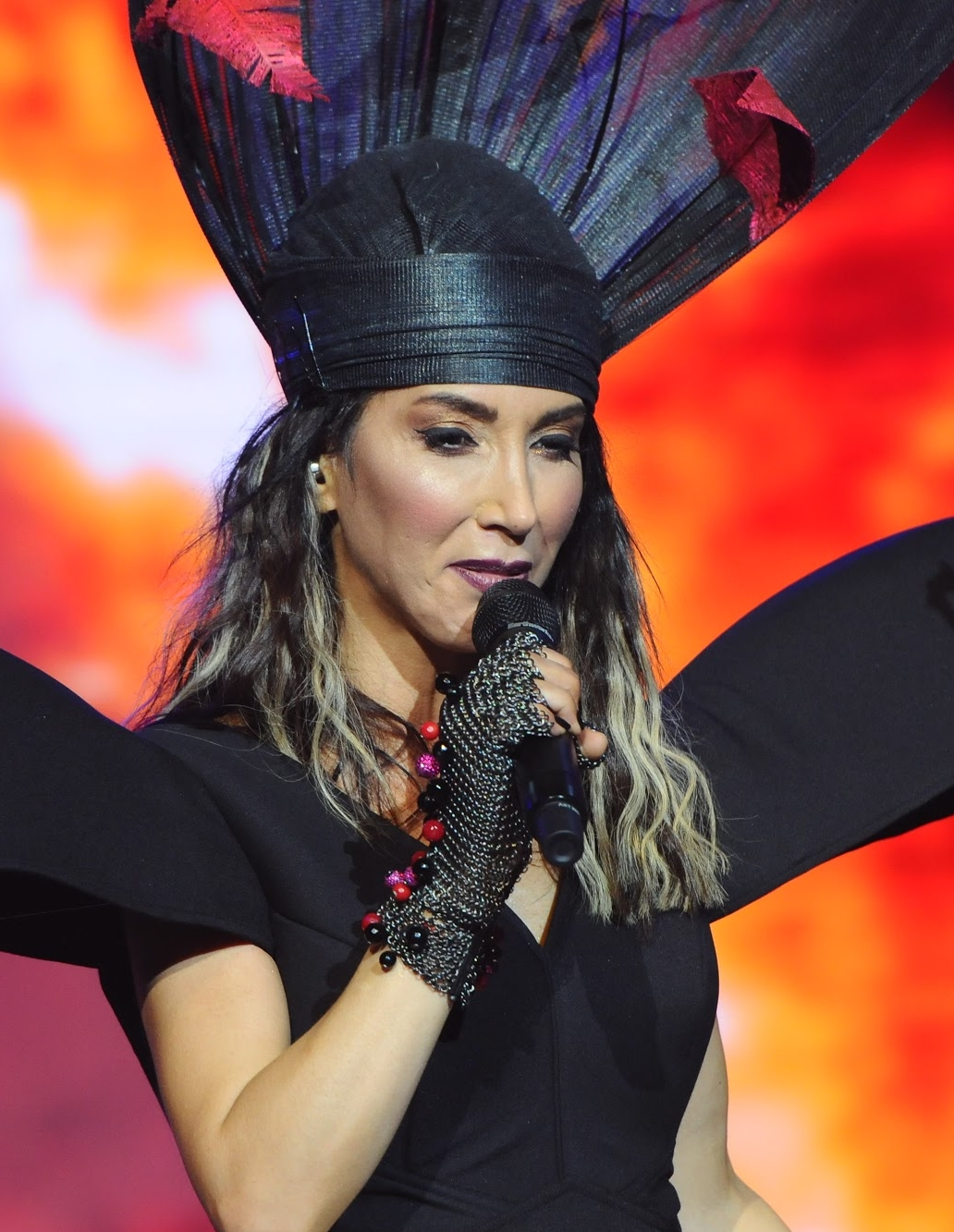
Yener performing at the Cemil Topuzlu Open-Air Theatre in 2015

In March 2015, she appeared as a guest judge on the second season of İşte Benim Stilim. Her first appearance as a guest judge was in late 2014. Also in March, she appeared on Volga Tamöz's album No. 2, performing the songs "Sebastian" and "Eve Nasıl Geldim"; "Sebastian" ranked first on MusicTopTR Official List for three weeks. After the release of "Sebastian", Yener went on the Sebastian 2015 Tour inside Turkey and across Europe. The song also gave its name to the beach and night club operated by Yener in Yalıkavak and Bodrum from June 2015 to November 2016. She was also a partner in Karaköy and Beyoğlu branches of the clubs between December 2015 and April 2016. Akşam newspaper later claimed that Yener withdrew from the venues due to loss of money. The singer continued her musical career by publishing "Kışkışşş", inspired by a scene in the movie Sosyete Şaban (1985), and made a duet with Serdar Ortaç on the song "İki Deli". "İki Deli" was named by Hürriyet's Naim Dilmener as "Hande Yener's worst song up to now". Nevertheless, the song ranked third on Turkey's music charts.

In January 2016, she directed Aylin Coşkun's music video for her song "Saftirik", which marked her first appearance as a music video director. The following month, she was verbally accused by Recep Güngör on Twitter, and after he sent messages to her home in Cihangir, she went to the police and made a criminal complaint. Güngör was later caught by police in front of Yener's house and according to the Constitution of Turkey was charged with "sexual harassment and disrupting the peace and tranquility of individuals". As a result of the trial, the court decided that Güngör, who was diagnosed with atypical psychosis, had no criminal responsibility as he was not able to perceive the legal meaning and consequences of the alleged offenses. In May, Yener appeared on Erol Evgin's album Altın Düetler, and together they performed the song "Sevdan Olmasa". The following month, Yener's 12th studio album, Hepsi Hit Vol. 1, was released and its lead single "Mor" topped Turkey's music charts for three weeks and won the Best Music Video award at the 43rd Golden Butterfly Awards. Music critics found songs on the album at an average level and compared some of them to the singer's old songs/ When referring to the album's title they argued that "not all of the songs were hit".

In January 2017, Yener performed at the Ülker Sports Arena during the half-time of the 2017 Turkey Basketball League All-Star's final. The following month she began to run the night club VIP Room in Arnavutköy. In June, her thirteenth studio album, Hepsi Hit Vol. 2, was released and she also opened the entertainment venue Neo in Çeşme. The album's lead single "Bakıcaz Artık", rose up to number two on Turkey's music charts. After the release of a music video for "Bakıcaz Artık", the songs "Benden Sonra" and "Vay" were also turned into music videos. Music critics restated the same criticism that the album's predecessor faced and again emphasized that not all of the songs in the album were hits; however, they generally praised the singer's collaboration with Mete Özgencil. According to a report by Telifmetre at the end of 2017, Yener was the Turkish artist with the most number of plays on radios and whose music videos were aired on music channels the most. However, Seren Serengil questioned the reliability of the report, and Yener shared a topless photo of Serengil on her social media accounts and made sarcastic comments about her. After that, the parties took their cases to the court, but a few months later they decided to reconcile and the lawsuits were withdrawn.

In 2018, Yener was featured on Aylin Coşkun's song "Manzara", which topped the music charts and its music video was directed by Yener herself. She also performed the song "Kış Güneşi" on Yıldız Tilbe's tribute album Yıldızlı Şarkılar. In the second half of the year, Yener released the deep house song "Beni Sev", which ranked second on Turkey's music charts, followed by her first English song "Love Always Wins". "Beni Sev" was well received by critics and was named one of the best songs of the year. The name of the song "Love Always Wins" is the same as the Love Wins slogan used in 2015 for the recognition of homosexual marriage in the US, and it brought back Yener's relationship with the LGBT movement back to the surface, and at the same time led to criticism as the singer had remained silent on LGBT issues for a long time. According to Telifmetre, Hande Yener was the female artist with the most number of streams in Turkey in 2018 with 154 different works. By the end of the year, Yener and fellow singer Demet Akalın reconciled after an 11-year feud which made them the subject of many tabloid news.

Yener continued her career by releasing four singles in 2019. Each of these songs had different styles and were considered as part of Yener's effort to renew her image during the differentiation process of the music industry. In February, she released the single "Aşk Tohumu". She was also featured on Australian singer Faydee's song "Gravity", which was released on the same day as "Aşk Tohumu". The electronic infrastructure of "Aşk Tohumu" was appreciated by music critics and was praised for bringing back memories of Yener's era of electronic music from a decade ago. Yener's other singles "Kuş", written by Altan Çetin, and "Krema", written by Mete Özgencil, were released in May and July respectively. While the song "Kuş" was defined as a more market-oriented work compared to "Beni Sev" and "Aşk Tohumu", it received less positive reviews. The song's music video was recorded in Zanzibar, Tanzania. The song "Krema" was found to be more alternative and received mixed reviews. Additionally, in 2019 Turkish rap music became more mainstream and the Turkish pop music market and its singers made an attempt to adapt to this new situation, among whom was also Yener. In addition to her musical works, Yener was a guest actress in the New Year's special episode of the TRT 1 series Kalk Gidelim at the end of the year.

=== 2020–present: Carpe Diem ===
To mark the 20th anniversary of her professional music career, Yener released her fourteenth studio album Carpe Diem in 2020. Many singers and songwriters collaborated with Yener on this album, including Berksan, Devrim Karaoğlu, Mete Özgencil, Fikri Karayel, and Misha. Throughout 2020, she released the singles "Pencere" and "Bela", none of which were later included in the album. After experiencing delays due to the COVID-19 pandemic, the album was eventually released on 2 October 2020.

In July 2021, Yener revealed in an interview that she had been diagnosed with breast cancer a year earlier and talked about her subsequent treatment and recovery.

In 2026, Yener became the subject of a criminal investigation by Turkish prosecutors after a complaint alleged that remarks she reportedly made during concerts in Istanbul and Muğla in 2025, including a statement interpreted as opposing the government and participation in an anti-President Erdoğan slogan chanted by the audience, constituted an attempt to overthrow the constitutional order under Turkish law.

== Artistry ==
=== Music style ===
Hande Yener's musical style, which includes change and innovation, has been interpreted by many critics in different ways and has been the subject of various articles. The singer, who aims to keep her name on the top by releasing hit songs every year, also says that she is often trying to keep her music style up-to-date with each new album and has changed her musical style from time to time by releasing a variety of different works. Despite these efforts, she has occasionally been accused of releasing the same kind of music in her albums over and over again. Yener's dramatic soprano voice was called "one of the most exciting voices of the 2000s" by Naim Dilmener of Hürriyet. Dilmener also mentioned that "after the 90s stars such as Yonca Evcimik, Aşkın Nur Yengi, Asya, and İzel faced a decline in their career in the 2000s, Yener made an ostentatious debut in [Turkey's] music markets and moved herself to the top with songs such as 'Kırmızı' and 'Acele Etme' which were written by Altan Çetin." Dilmener's viewpoint was supported by Mine Ayman, who on an interview with Best FM said that the rise in Yener's career happened over a short period of time due to her beautiful voice and good choice of songs.

Some of Yener's songs are against the idea of love, and are sung through the view point of an ex-lover who addresses her beloved with the lyrics. Hürriyet's Sadi Tirak reacted to the lyrics "Kaybeden kim? E tabii ki sensin. (Who's the loser? Well, of course you are.)" in the song "Kaybol" (Mükemmel, 2014) by labeling them as "classic Hande Yener concept" and wrote that the content of Yener's songs are mutual with those of Demet Akalın in this aspect. The singer has written almost all the lyrics on several of her albums, but she has worked periodically with various songwriters such as Altan Çetin, Alper Narman, Fettah Can and Sinan Akçıl on most of her albums and described the songs written by them as "rebellious and hard like her own language". She also claimed that her aim was to change the stereotyped pop by "changing the meaning of its philosophy in popular culture and giving it a deeper meaning" and said that she was trying to draw the image of a strong woman in her songs.

Hande Yener, who is typically a pop singer, has changed her musical style many times over the years. She finds dance songs more suitable for the albums that she releases in summer. She started her career by placing fantasy pop songs in the albums Senden İbaret (2000), Sen Yoluna... Ben Yoluma... (2002) and Aşk Kadın Ruhundan Anlamıyor (2004), and after becoming famous she changed her style with her 2006 album Apayrı, by turning into house music. Being inspired by the works of Madonna, Kylie Minogue and Robbie Williams, she set aside house music aside and began releasing works in the genres of electronic dance music, rock and R&B. She first picked up on electronic music with Nasıl Delirdim? (2007), and maintained this style on Hipnoz (2008) and Hayrola? (2009). Akşam's Mehmet Özdoğan wrote that these electronic music albums were clearly inspired by and similar to Madonna's Confessions on a Dance Floor (2005). With her 2010 album Hande'ye Neler Oluyor?, she returned to making pop music and blended electronic and pop music together. In the albums Teşekkürler (2011) and Kraliçe (2012), she began collaborating with Sinan Akçıl. The effects of electronic music were seen in her pop albums Mükemmel and Hepsi Hit Vol. 1 (2016). In the second pop phase of her career since 2010, Yener has been repeatedly accused by many critics of releasing songs immensely similar to those of the first pop phase of her career.

=== Influences ===
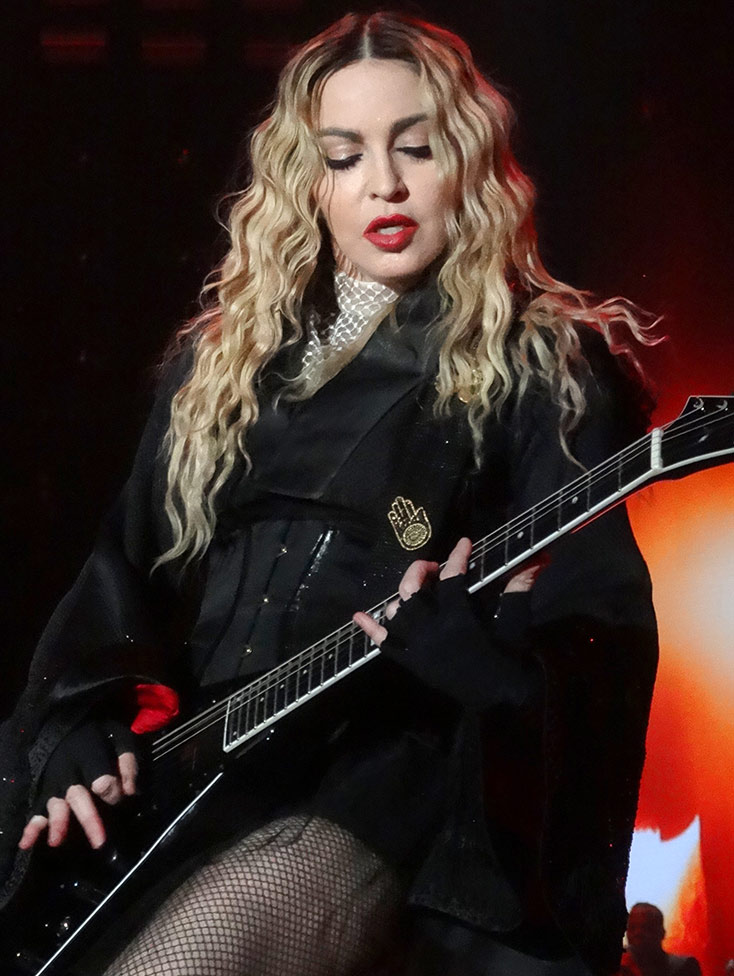
American singer Madonna has been a source of inspiration for Yener.

Yener has said that she has been influenced by various artists while shaping her career. Before becoming famous, she was mostly inspired by Sezen Aksu about which she said: "I was always imitating Sezen Aksu, and especially I would keep singing her songs 'Sen Ağlama' and 'Hadi Bakalım'. Meeting her and working alongside her to enter the music industry had made me freak out." While describing the songs in her first studio album, she said: "Because I'm a fan of Jennifer Lopez, there are fast and intense songs in my album that wriggle people's souls."

The songs in her album Sen Yoluna... Ben Yoluma... were found similar to those of Aksu's early career, and with the release of Aşk Kadın Ruhundan Anlamıyor she was described by many as "Ajda Pekkan of the future" as her music style in this album was compared to that of Aksu, as well as Pekkan. In response to comparisons, Yener said that she has been influenced by both of them and said: "I listened to foreign music for years. I started listening to Turkish music by listening to Ajda Pekkan and Sezen Aksu. I wanted to become a singer out of my love for them. They have had their influence on me, I accept it."

In 2004, she said that she didn't want people to get tired of her and that artists should be like Madonna to be listened to for years. Yener has described herself as a big fan of Madonna, and is inspired by her energy on stage and courage. In a statement given to MTV Turkey in response to the question "On the comments about you, the name Madonna appears in some way. Is it really a goal for you to be like Madonna?", she said: "They tried to link me to Sezen Aksu after my first album was released. Of course my idol is Madonna. Besides, it's very normal to be inspired by a world star like Madonna. I wish I could have access to great technology and power like her, but that's not possible. But believe me, I would do something in my own way, even if I were in a situation like that. What I'm impressed with is her energy on stage." European magazine Starstyle, described Yener in its 2006 list of the bests as "Turkish Madonna". In 2007 Demet Akalın, Ebru Destan and Serdar Ortaç referred to her as "Fake Madonna". As a result of these words, she entered into arguments with these people. In 2009, she again faced questions about her admiration for Madonna, about which she said: "She is the only living star in the world. I watch the documentaries and concerts of many artists. What I see in all of them is their work and dedication to this job. I also put 'I cannot do it.' aside, and started saying to myself 'You're gonna do it, you gotta do it. If you want this job, you must be accoutered.' Madonna's use of energy is very interesting to me. I'm trying to give something beyond the expectations in my concerts. Of course nobody can be like her. But at least I see the key that will make me rise." She has also said that Bülent Ersoy is among her idols.

== Image ==
Hande Yener attracted attention in the Turkish press with her unusual outfits and her frequently changed image, and she became the topic of social media discussions from time to time. Yener, who likes to make changes in her image, stated that she wants to refresh her image regularly and follows the general trend of fashion in the world and aims to surprise her audience with a new look. She often caught the attention of the press with her shorts and swimsuits that she often wears on stage. She appeared before her audience with a different image in almost every album. In 2008, music critic Naim Dilmener responded to the comments surrounding Yener's electronic music and copying the image of Marilyn Manson by saying: "Her robotic music is, in simple words, bad. I don't find it strange if she pops up as one of the villains in Dünyayı Kurtaran Adam." In 2009, the pin-up models of the 1950s and 1960s were her most obvious source of inspiration based on which she chose her outfits. Kemal Doğulu, Yener's fashion consultant for many years, tried to create a new image for the singer by following fashion shows and new styles on magazines, and applying them to her style of music. In 2016, fashion designer Cemil İpekçi described Yener as the most frumpish dressed celebrity in Turkey.

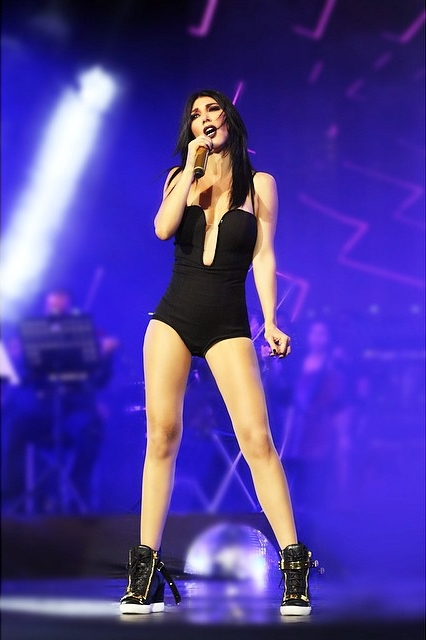
By wearing short and sleeveless costumes on stage, Yener attracted the attention of the press.

Hande Yener has been compared to numerous people, especially Madonna, during various periods in terms of her appearance in music videos and image. When she released the album Apayrı in 2006, her image was compared to that of Sibel Kekilli, and hair slightly wavy hairstyle was found similar to that of Madonna's in the late 1970s. Some claimed that the music video for "Hayrola?" resembled Madonna's clips for the songs "Hollywood" and "Give It 2 Me". To those who found these similarities she said: "Humans look like each other. [...] Similarities do not bother me. 'Did you do it for the sake of similarity?' is the question that makes me go crazy. I dyed my hair brown and some said 'She has tried to look like Sibel Kekilli'." During the same period, Ebru Çapa who writes for Hürriyet, commented on the rumors about the similarities in Yener's work to others and said: "Let Hande Yener pray for her mother who gave birth to a pretentious daughter with an unadorned nature. Otherwise, with the release of this latest album, and the rain of criticism that has emerged in terms of 'similarities', she could have easily been worn out and fallen ill with schizophrenia."

In 2007, for her music video "Romeo" and in one of her concerts, she wore an outfit similar to the one worn by Jennifer Lopez at the 2006 Echo Music Prize. Since 2009, her image has been compared to that of Lady Gaga many times. She later said that she was tired of the comparisons. She rejected the existence of similarities with Gaga and said: "I did crazy things in my electronic music albums. There was no Lady Gaga back then." In 2013, Yener went on the podium with an outfit similar to one of Gaga's in a fashion week, about which she said: "All fashion designers around the world want to work with her. Even when she appears in the airport, she creates a phenomenon. She's a trend-making star." Throughout her career, Yener has also been compared to Björk, Cher, Katy Perry, Kim Kardashian, Kylie Minogue and Rihanna. Akşam later claimed that, for a period, Yener was referred as "Imitator Hande" due to these similarities. In 2010, her music video for "Sopa" was found similar to Cheryl's music video for "3 Words". In the same year, she had a performance on Beyaz Show with a balloon that was similar to the one used by Minogue on one of her shows, and similar scenes were also found between Yener's music video "Bodrum" and Minogue's music video "Slow". Yener was a nominee for the Female Music Star award at the Elle Style Awards in 2010 and 2014, but lost the first one to Şebnem Ferah and the second one to Atiye. In 2014, for the cover of Mükemmel she wore a golden glittering outfit similar to the one used by Rihanna in the music video for "Rude Boy". Previously in 2007, similar scenes were found between Yener's music video for "Kibir" and Rihanna's music video for "SOS".

== Other ventures ==
=== Gay icon ===
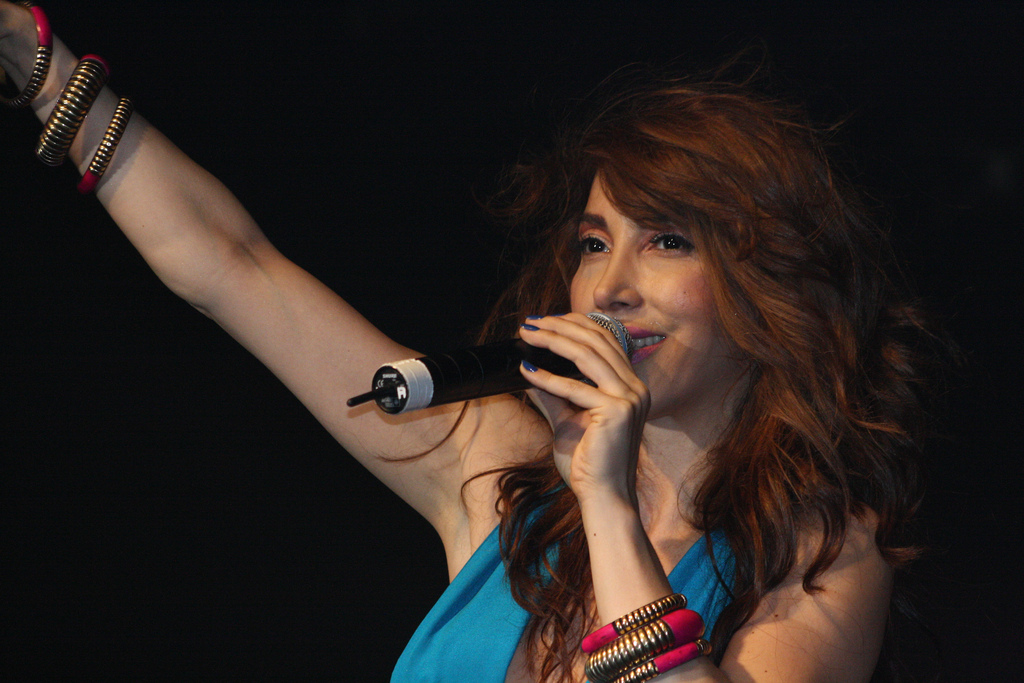
Yener was referred to as a gay icon in Turkey for a while, but she became target of criticism in the following years after being silent about LGBT issues and working with people who were against homosexuals.

In the late 2000s, Hande Yener was referred to as Turkey's gay icon, but the sincerity of her relationship with the LGBT movement in the late 2010s was questioned. After the release of Nasıl Delirdim? in 2007, Yener was asked questions about the fondness of gay people of herself. Yener responded by saying: "I think they are very good music listeners. Although they may criticize one heavily but fairly, they also appreciate good work in the right direction. Because they listen carefully, they understand music very well. They feel like a musician."; meanwhile she also said that there is a "nice bond" between gays. In the same year, in a survey conducted by KAOS GL, Yener became Turkey's top-rated gay icon. The magazine's editor Uğur Yüksel said that Yener's choice as a gay icon was due to the effective statements that she had made which attracted the favor of homosexuals. In 2008, Yener urged the politicians to solve the issues about homosexuals in Turkey to help with accelerating the negotiations about accession of Turkey to the European Union. Additionally, she said that she often went to gay bars during that period. Yener had a role as a gay icon in the Turkish LGBT film Kraliçe Fabrika'da (2008), during which she appears in a gay's dream and talks to him.

In 2009, she participated in the Istanbul Pride and made a statement on the rights of homosexuals in Turkey: "I do not think that homosexuals in Turkey are given the proper value they deserve. They act as if homosexuals don't exist. This is a very sad situation. They also have rights. Everyone needs to protect their rights." Emir Akgün of the Gmag magazine stated that the participation of Yener in the march was considered as "a clever ad for some people, and also quite intimate for others at the same time". Musician Bedük also commented on Yener's position as a gay icon by saying: "What you call icon doesn't pop up at a single time or with an album. I think it can be attributed to those who have destroyed the taboos, moved stones and those that have done something extraordinary for the community. It can be George Michael, Madonna, or Zeki Müren, but not Hande." Boğaziçi University LGBTI+ Studies Club announced in a statement that Yener had "stepped down from gay advocacy" after the Istanbul Pride 2009.

Yener's relationship with the LGBT movement and the questioning of this relationship came up again in 2018. In the second half of the year, she released her first English song "Love Always Wins". The name of the song is the same as the Love Wins slogan used in 2015 for the recognition of homosexual marriage in the US, and it brought back the questions surrounding Yener's relationship with the movement back to the surface, and at the same time led to criticism as she had remained silent on LGBT issues for ten years. Following the songwriter Mert Ekren's comments, in which he stated that he hated homosexuals, Yener's decision to continue working with Ekren gave rise to a number of reactions. Onur Baştürk from Hürriyet saw the choice for the song's title as an effort to promote Yener outside Turkey through the LGBT movement and criticized the singer by saying, "When it suits your work, 'love wins'. ... It's clear where you are making a reference to. Nobody's stupid." Asu Maro from Milliyet also commented on the song's title and wore, "It is very hard to believe that the name of the song was chosen by chance, obviously Yener still believes in her old position as a gay icon."

In the same period, Yener became the target of criticism from the LGBT movement after images and footage showing the singer İntizar being involved in an intimate relationship with another woman were leaked on the internet. Poll Production, which served as the production company for both İntizar and Yener, immediately terminated its contract with İntizar after the leak of the images and videos. Yener supported the production company's decision for dismissing İntizar, and as a result both the production company owner Polat Yağcı and Yener were labeled as homophobic and became subject of criticism. The company and Yener reacted to the criticism by issuing separate statements and arguing that the contract's termination was not related in any way to İntizar's sexual orientation, and the decision was only made because of the lack of trust between the two parties. In May 2019, a party which included a show making fun of Demet Akalın and Yener's feud and in which a number of drag queens had participated was cancelled due to the unauthorized use of Yener's name at the event. In a statement, Yener said that the party was not cancelled by her but through a warning issued by the production company based on their agreement on naming rights, and added: "I am always full of support and love for LGBT. ... [On this issue] I am constantly being subjected to injustice and slander. I want you to know that I love you, and the rest is a lie."

=== Philanthropy ===
Hande Yener says that she is keen to take on social responsibility projects and she especially cares about taking part in charitable activities involving children. In 2000, she appeared on a special episode of Late Night Show on MTV as part of a campaign to help the survivors of the 1999 İzmit earthquake. In the same year, she visited the Our Children with Leukemia Foundation and presented children with gifts. In August 2007, she joined the "Our Heart Beats On The Street" project for derelict animals and together with Ajda Pekkan, Candan Erçetin, Sezen Aksu and Yaşar performed at the Kuruçeşme Arena as a part of the project's campaign. In May 2009, a member of Leukemia and Cancer Patients Health Education Association appeared on Disko Kralı, and said that they had made efforts to organize a concert for the benefit of children with leukemia, but they did not receive any support. Yener promised to participate in the concert by calling the program, and took the stage at the concert. At the end of the same year, she participated in Olay TV's program Gecenin Rengi and contributed to a project organized for disabled people. In 2010, she joined the Greenpeace movement in Turkey and supported their anti-nuclear stance by asking the government to abandon its nuclear energy plans in Turkey. She took part in a video for Greenpeace's campaign, in which she stated: "I'm very uncomfortable with the nuclear plans in Turkey. When I think of nuclear energy, I can't think of anything positive: Chernobyl, nuclear leak, nuclear waste, nuclear weapons ..." At the end of the same year, she joined Radyo D's program "Language of the Forests, We are the Enemies of Fire" and planted a tree during the campaign, and performed a new version of her song "Bodrum" under the new title "Orman (Forest)". In December 2011, she took the stage at the "Pop for Van" concert organized by the Şişli Municipality in Istanbul for the assistance of the victims of the earthquake in Van. In 2012, she performed at an event to help needy students in Kuşadası. In July 2013, as a part of a project in Eastern Turkey called "Each Book, A World", which was founded to support six different schools, Yener appeared on the project's promotion day and played roles for children. In May 2014, she took part on the project Children Smile with Hope for the Future, organized by Hope Foundation for Children with Cancer, and appeared on the project's banners wearing a medical mask, and later on 20 September she organized a promotion day for the charity. On 1 August of the same year, she participated as a competitor in Star TV's program Eyvah Düşüyorum to assist the Tohum Autism Foundation. In June 2015, she distributed signatures in exchange for books in Mersin and Muğla for the school libraries in need.

=== Politics ===
Although Hande Yener stated that she followed politics closely, she did not take part in any political movement or event for many years. However, in 2013 she reacted to the urban development plan for Istanbul's Taksim Gezi Park by joining the Gezi Park protests at the Taksim Square. She also canceled her concerts because of the events. She then made a statement saying that she was "not involved in an organizations by any party". In July 2014, Yener and other artists from the same production company joined Prime Minister Recep Tayyip Erdoğan's campaign meeting for the presidential elections. The participation of Yener and other artists in the meeting was subject to negative criticism by the opponents of the Erdoğan government. Yener stated that her appearance in the meeting was an example of personal freedom and replied to the criticism by saying that the so-called freedom lovers were liars. In an interview in March 2015, she was reminded of the criticism, in response to which she said: "I find ourselves right to be free and to be free to communicate. Such a communication took place. Now that I'm one of the pop stars of this country, isn't viewing my participation in that meeting as improper a type of stuffiness?" In July, after the failed coup attempt occurred in Turkey, she became one of the signatories of an anti-coup bulletin alongside other celebrities and the next month, in the Yenikapı Rally Area, she joined the Democracy and Martyrs Rally, organized by the government of AKP and the opposition parties CHP and MHP. In April 2018, together with various other singers and actors, she went to Hatay to visit the Turkish soldiers who were in the Operation Olive Branch. In December 2019, Yener together with Demet Akalın and producer Polat Yağcı had a meeting with Turkish President Recep Tayyip Erdoğan. Prevention of child abuse and violence against women were among the discussed topics during the meeting.

== Achievements ==
Throughout her career, Hande Yener has received numerous awards and nominations. As of June 2015, she possessed 56 awards at her home. In the year she made her debut, she won two Golden Butterfly Awards, and in 2008 and 2011 received two more awards from the organization as the Turkish Female Pop Music Soloist of the Year. Her album Sen Yoluna... Ben Yoluma... sold more than a million copies, making her one of the few artists with such sales figure in Turkey in the 2000s. After Sen Yoluna... Ben Yoluma..., her subsequent albums Aşk Kadın Ruhundan Anlamıyor and Apayrı earned commercial success, earning Yener certifications by MÜ-YAP. In 2007, at the award ceremony organized by İstanbul FM, she received the Best Female Pop Artist award.

Yener also received various nominations at the Kral Turkey Music Awards (formerly Kral TV Video Music Awards), but she only won four of these nominations. She was a nominee for the Best Turkish Act at the 2008 MTV Europe Music Awards, but lost to Emre Aydın. In 2009, she was given the Honorary Award at the European Union Quality Awards. In 2013, she won the Best Stage Performance award at the 3rd Pal FM Music Awards. At the Siyaset Magazine Awards in 2007, 2011 and 2012, Yener received the Turkish Female Pop Music Artist award. With her songs "Yalanın Batsın", "Sen Yoluna... Ben Yoluma...", "Kırmızı" and "Romeo", her name appeared on Sabah's list of the 2000s' Top Hot Summer Songs.

== Discography ==
- Senden İbaret (2000)
- Sen Yoluna... Ben Yoluma... (2002)
- Aşk Kadın Ruhundan Anlamıyor (2004)
- Apayrı (2006)
- Nasıl Delirdim? (2007)
- Hipnoz (2008)
- Hayrola? (2009)
- Hande'ye Neler Oluyor? (2010)
- Teşekkürler (2011)
- Kraliçe (2012)
- Mükemmel (2014)
- Hepsi Hit Vol. 1 (2016)
- Hepsi Hit Vol. 2 (2017)
- Carpe Diem (2020)
- Afrodizyak (2023)

== Filmography ==
=== Film ===
Film	Year	Director	Role	Descriptions
Kraliçe Fabrika'da	2008	Ali Kemal Güven	Gay icon (Supporting role)	Kraliçe Fabrika, is a 2008 Turkish film with the theme of homosexuality. Yener plays the role of a gay icon in the movie.

=== Television ===
Title	Year	Director	Role	Descriptions
5 Maymun Çetesi	2000	Yağmur Taylan	Herself (Guest appearance)	5 Maymun Çetesi is a comedy series, starring İlker Aksum, which was aired on TGRT between 1999 and 2000. Yener appeared as a guest in one of the series' episodes.
Dadı	2001	Ebru Yalçın, Fatih Aksoy, Günay Köker	Herself (Guest appearance)	Dadı is a comedy series, starring Gülben Ergen, Kenan Işık, Haldun Dormen and Seray Sever. It is an adaptation of the American series The Nanny and was aired on Show TV and Star TV between 2001 and 2002. Yener appeared as a guest in one of the series' episodes.
Hande Yener Show	2003	—N/a	Herself (Presenter)	Hande Yener presented the program Hande Yener Show in 2003. It was aired on Star TV.
Geniş Aile	2010	Ömer Uğur	Herself (Guest appearance)	Geniş Aile is a comedy series, starring Ufuk Özkan and Fırat Tanış. It was aired on Kanal D and Star TV between 2009 and 2011. Yener starred as a guest actress in the special episode of the series for the 2011 Christmas Eve.
Kalk Gidelim	2019	Yahya Samancı	Herself (Guest appearance)	Kalk Gidelim is a comedy series, starring Ufuk Özkan, Erkan Sever, Ayça Varlıer, and Mehtap Bayri. It has been aired on TRT 1 since 2017. Yener starred as a guest actress in the special episode of the series for the 2020 Christmas Eve.

=== Commercials ===
Company/Product	Year	Director	Descriptions
Filli Boya	2002	—N/a	In 2002, Yener played in the commercials for Filli Boya together with Ebru Yaşar.
Panda	2011	—N/a	Yener played in one of the commercials published by the ice cream brand Panda in 2011.
Morhipo	2012	Ozan Açıktan	Hande Yener, along with Demet Akalın, played in four of morhipo.com's commercials.
