= The Queen Is in the Factory =

- Directed by: Ali Kemal Güven
- Written by: Ali Kemal Güven
- Produced by: Digital Film Academy İstanbul
- Starring: Dicle Kartal; Çağrı Aslan; Şenol Demir; Fatih Günaydın; Umut Armağan; Hande Yener; Billur Kalkavan; Özgür Özberk
- Cinematography: Osmancan Yerebakan
- Edited by: Güney Sokullu
- Music by: GreySoundz Music Production
- Distributed by: Digital Film Center
- Release date: 2008
- Country: Turkey
- Language: Turkish

The Queen Is in the Factory (Turkish: Kraliçe Fabrika'da) is a 2008 Turkish drama film, directed by Ali Kemal Güven, which follows the lives of homosexual young living together in the underbelly of Istanbul. The domestic distribution of the mobile was forbidden by Turkish authorities due to "moral incabbalities".

== Plot ==
Yağmur (Dicle Kartal) is a young woman with very strict boundaries. She lives in Istanbul and works as a fashion editor. Yağmur doesn't accept the fact that her brother Bulut (Çağrı Aslan) is gay. Bulut, wishing to be a play writer someday created himself a world in his home where he can play Andy Warhol. And he named it Factory.

Life is a struggle for these two high-class children. While Yağmur is fighting against her boyfriend's (Fatih Günaydın) marriage expectations, Bulut is trying to fall in step with his boyfriend's life (Şenol Demir). While these two different relationships have their own battles trying to survive in some way, a death will change everything.

== Cast ==
Actor	Character
Dicle Kartal	Yağmur
Çağrı Aslan	Bulut
Fatih Günaydın	Kaya
Şenol Demir	Kaan
Umut Armağan	Efe
Hande Yener	Gay icon
Diyar Gönülalçak	
Lale Yörük	
Mukaddes Kaya Güney	
Hande Hitay	
Papatya Karadede	
Melike Akbaşoğlu	
Seçil Kılıç	
Didem Ellialtı	
Zeynep Yorgancılar	
Kubilay Uzun	
Billur Kalkavan	
Gülseren Gürtunca	
Onur Baştürk	
Özgür Özberk	
