= Billur Kalkavan =

Turkish actress (1962–2022)

- Born: 2 November 1962; Üsküdar, Istanbul, Turkey
- Died: 15 October 2022 (aged 59); Zeytinburnu, Istanbul, Turkey
- Resting place: Zincirlikuyu Cemetery
- Occupations: Actress, television presenter
- Years active: 1969–2022
- Partner: Buğra Bahadırlı (2009–2022)
- Relatives: Zülüflü İsmail Paşa (great-grandfather)

Billur Kalkavan (2 November 1962 – 15 October 2022) was a Turkish actress, socialite and television presenter.

== Life and career ==
Billur Kalkavan was born on 2 November 1962 in the Beylerbeyi neighborhood of Istanbul. Her mother was Nuyan Kalkavan, and her father was shipowner Nazım Kalkavan. Her mother Nuyan was a granddaughter of Zülüflü İsmail Paşa, a son of the 31st Ottoman sultan Abdulmejid I.

Kalkavan's first cinematic experience was when she was just a seven-year-old girl, playing the role of a child kidnapped for ransom by the villain played by Erol Taş in the film Ayrı Dünyalar (1969).

Kalkavan started secondary school in the USA, then returned to Turkey and studied at Kadıköy Maarif College. She then dropped out of high school and worked in various jobs since the age of 16. In 1978, she starred in the movie Sultan, directed by Kartal Tibet. She then worked as a secretary at Güneş newspaper for a while. She went back to the United States after the newspaper was sold in 1984 and completed her education by taking the high school graduation exams there. She took psychology classes at the University of California, Los Angeles. She returned to Turkey after living in the USA for four years.

Kalkavan was a presenter on TRT, acted in television series and became a known figure on Turkish television. She further rose to prominence with her night life and love affairs. She was particularly known for speaking openly about her sexuality, due to which she was described as a "marginal" personality. She was also known for her appearance and the tattoos on her right shoulder, which she had done in Sweden in 1980.

In 1994, she took part in the music video for the song "Deli Et Beni" by singer Emel Müftüoğlu. This video turned lesbianism to be a topic in the mainstream media, both because of the lyrics of the song and the dance performed by Billur Kalkavan and Yeşim Salkım.

Kalkavan first appeared on stage in 1996 with a role in Tiyatro Çisenti's play Açık Evlilik. As a shareholder at Tiyatro Çisenti, she also took part in the musical Bir İstanbul Masalı, and in the play Dilekçe. In 2000, she played a stripper in the theater play Marion and Muhammed, staged by the New Theatre in Istanbul. The striptease scene in the play caused a sensation at the time.

Beginning in the 1990s, she appeared in the movies Mavi Sürgün, Gece Otostopçusu, Ölüm Peşimizde, Kraliçe Fabrika'da, Mezuniyet, Çarşı Pazar, and Canavar Gibi: Türk İşi Frankeştayn. She also appeared in the TV series Tatlı Kaçıklar, Böyle mi Olacaktı, and Eyvah Babam.

Kalkavan came to the fore again with her nude poses for a series in 2008. In 2012, she presented a talk show about sexual life on the television channel HTV, which broadcasts health-related programs. She also created a YouTube channel named Billur Tv with her partner, Buğra Bahadırlı in 2014, and made videos about astrology, sexuality and other topics. She continued to host videos until her death.

== Death ==
Kalkavan died on 15 October 2022 at a hospital in Istanbul where she was undergoing treatment for lung cancer. Following a funeral service on 17 October, she was buried at Zincirlikuyu Cemetery.

== Filmography ==
Film
Year	Title	Role	Notes	
1969	Ayrı Dünyalar	Billur		
1978	Sultan	Aslı		
1993	Mavi Sürgün	Sare İsmet Hanım		
1995	Gece Otostopçusu	İlkay		
2000	Ölüm Peşimizde			
2008	Kraliçe Fabrika'da			
2008	Mezuniyet			
2015	Çarşı Pazar	Şenay		
2017	Canavar Gibi: Türk İşi Frankeştayn			
Television
Year	Title	Role	Notes	
1992	Aşık Oldum	Afet		
1994	Sonradan Görmeler			
1996	Tatlı Kaçıklar	Emel		
1996	Şahin			
1997	Böyle mi Olacaktı	Nazan		
1998	Eyvah Babam	Belkıs		
2000	Eyvah Kızım Büyüdü	Filiz		
2002	Azad	Canan		
2002	Reyting Hamdi			
2003	Patron Kim?			
2004	Metro Palas	Seda		
2005–2006	Ihlamurlar Altında	Handan Tekiner		
2008	Bir Avuç Huzur			
2008	Servet Avcısı	Nejla		
2012	Acayip Hikayeler	Ayten		
2012	Trophy Türk	Herself	Contestant	
TV programs
Year	Title	Network	References	Notes
1992	Saklambaç	Show TV		TV presenter
1998	Huysuz Show	Show TV		Guest appearance
2005	Hello Moto	Number 1 TV		Guest appearance
2006	Billur Rengi	Elmax		TV presenter
2013	Sen ve Ben	Türkmax		Guest appearance
2014	Hilal'le Artı Muhabbet	Haber Artı Bir		Guest appearance
2014	Hakan Çelik ile Hafta Sonu Keyfi	CNN Türk		Guest appearance
2019	Magazin Noteri (episode 5)	Magazin Noteri		Guest appearance
2020	Soramazsın (episode 57)	BluTV		Guest appearance
2020	BİLLUR TV (YENİ NESİL TV)	Billur TV		TV presenter
2020	Buralarda Neler Dönüyor bi'bilsen (episode 10)			Guest appearance
2020	Dekolte Plus by Ahu Karaduman	Dekolte Plus by Ahu Karaduman		Guest appearance
2021	Aykırı Sorular B12	TV Kadıköy		Guest appearance
2021	Haber Bahane (episode 16)	Haberler.com		Guest appearance
2021	AŞK'A ELVEDA	Ezber Bozan TV		Guest appearance
2022	HT Stüdyo	Habertürk TV		Guest appearance
2022	196Sekiz	Armağan Çağlayan		Guest appearance
2022	Müge ve Gülşen'le 2. Sayfa (episode 94)	TV8		Guest appearance
