= Sebastian 2015 Tour =

2015 concert tour by Hande Yener

- Tour by Hande Yener
- The first poster of the tour, published on the Internet with concert dates.
- Associated album: Sebastian + Mükemmel
- Start date: 13 March 2015
- End date: September 2015
- No. of shows: 13 in Europe; 35 in Asia; 48 in total

Sebastian 2015 Tour was a concert tour by Turkish singer Hande Yener, in support of her eleventh studio album, Mükemmel (2014). It was named after the song "Sebastian", which Yener had performed for Volga Tamöz's album No. 2. The tour was first announced on 6 March 2015 by producer Polat Yağcı. It began on 13 March 2015 in Turkey and concluded in September 2015. Alongside Turkey, Yener also had concerts in Germany, Austria, Azerbaijan, the Netherlands and Northern Cyprus. During the tour, Yener wore outfits that were estimated to be €30,000 and was accompanied by a team of 16 people.

== Set list ==
This set list is from the concert on 31 July 2015 at the Cemil Topuzlu Open-Air Theatre. It is not intended to represent all shows from the tour.

1. "Naber"
2. "Alt Dudak"
3. "Yalanın Batsın"
4. "Acele Etme"
5. "Acı Veriyor"
6. "Sopa"
7. "Rüya"
8. "Hasta"
9. "Bana Anlat"
10. "Kışkışşş"
11. "Kırmızı"
12. "Sebastian"
13. "Kelepçe"
14. "Armağan"
15. "Bodrum"
16. "Haberi Var mı?"
17. "Yoksa Mani"
18. "Atma"
19. "Aşkın Ateşi"
20. "Kibir (Yanmam Lazım)"
21. "Romeo"
22. "Hani Bana"

== Shows ==
List of concerts, showing date, city, country, venue, and opening acts
Date	City	Country	Venue	Opening act(s)
Asia
13 March 2015	Antalya	Turkey	—	—
14 March 2015	Antalya	Turkey	Club Ally	—
16 March 2015	Antalya	Turkey	—	—
19 March 2015	Edirne	Turkey	Margi Hotel	—
20 March 2015	Çanakkale	Turkey	Lodos Bar	—
21 March 2015	Baku	Azerbaijan	Rixos Hotel	—
22 March 2015	Kyrenia	Northern Cyprus	—	—
Europe
29 March 2015	Istanbul	Turkey	Brandium	—
30 March 2015	Istanbul	Turkey	—	—
Asia
1 April 2015	Konya	Turkey	Club Inferno	—
2 April 2015	Baku	Azerbaijan	—	—
Europe
4 April 2015	Bochum	Germany	Club Taksim	—
5 April 2015	Munich	Germany	Club Şamdan	—
Asia
10 April 2015	Ankara	Turkey	Quaestor Club	Çağın Kulaçoğlu, David Vendetta
17 April 2015	Trabzon	Turkey	Yalı Park Hotel	—
18 April 2015	Ordu	Turkey	Gardenya Cafe Restaurant	—
24 April 2015	İzmir	Turkey	Berdush Meyhane	Çağın Kulaçoğlu
25 April 2015	Adana	Turkey	Sahne Adana	—
Europe
26 April 2015	Rotterdam	The Netherlands	Club Eclipse	—
1 May 2015	Antwerp	Belgium	NOXX	—
Asia
2 May 2015	Bursa	Turkey	22:02	Çağın Kulaçoğlu
Europe
4 May 2015	Istanbul	Turkey	Cevahir Hotel	—
6 May 2015	Istanbul	Turkey	—	—
7 May 2015	Istanbul	Turkey	Okan University	—
9 May 2015	Istanbul	Turkey	Işık University	—
Asia
10 May 2015	Kahramanmaraş	Turkey	Arsan Center	Çağın Kulaçoğlu
16 May 2015	Muğla	Turkey	Club Pasha	Çağın Kulaçoğlu
17 May 2015	Gebze	Turkey	Gebze Alaettin Kurt Stadium	—
23 May 2015	Antalya	Turkey	Alanya City Hall	Çağın Kulaçoğlu
25 May 2015	Mersin	Turkey	Cumhuriyet Square^{[A]}	—
27 May 2015	İzmir	Turkey	Megapol City	—
29 May 2015	Trabzon	Turkey	Avrasya University	—
Europe
30 May 2015	Vienna	Austria	Club 34	—
Asia
31 May 2015	İzmir	Turkey	Dere Mesire Arena	—
4 June 2015	Antalya	Turkey	Konyaaltı Kent Square	—
5 June 2015	Ankara	Turkey	Park Vera Shopping Center^{[B]}	—
12 June 2015	Muğla	Turkey	Sebastian Beach Club	Çağın Kulaçoğlu; Ersay Üner
14 June 2015	Muğla	Turkey	Club Pasha	—
22 July 2015	İzmir	Turkey	Megapol City	—
26 July 2015	Muğla	Turkey	Club Pasha	—
Europe
31 July 2015	Istanbul	Turkey	Cemil Topuzlu Open-Air Theatre	—
Asia
1 August 2015	Aydın	Turkey	Jade Beach Club	—
Europe
9 August 2015	Istanbul	Turkey	—	—
Asia
12 August 2015	İzmir	Turkey	Megapol City	—
15 August 2015	İzmir	Turkey	—	—
23 August 2015	Muğla	Turkey	Club Pasha	—
Europe
6 September 2015	Kırklareli	Turkey	—	—
Asia
9 September 2015	İzmir	Turkey	Megapol City	—
19 September 2015	—	Uzbekistan	—	—

== Cancelled shows ==
List of cancelled concerts, showing date, city, country, and venue
Date	City	Country	Venue	Reason
28 March 2015	Eskişehir	Turkey	Club Marque	Unknown
15 May 2015	London	United Kingdom	HMW Forum	Unknown
25 May 2015	Adana	Turkey	—	Unknown^{[C]}
3 June 2015	Istanbul	Turkey	Çilek Pera	Unknown
11 June 2015	Istanbul	Turkey	Cağaloğlu Anadolu Lisesi	Fatih District's Education Directorate did not allow the show to be organized.
6 September 2015	Muğla	Turkey	Club Pasha	Unknown^{[D]}

== Notes ==
- A $\neg$ This concert was planned to be held on 18 May 2015, but the date was changed after the attack on HDP's headquarters in Mersin.
- B $\neg$ The concert at Park Vera Shopping Center was planned to be held on 24 May but this date was later changed to 5 June.
- C $\neg$ On 25 May, it was announced that Yener would perform in Mersin.
- D $\neg$ It was initially announced in March that on 6 September 2015 Yener would perform at the Muğla Club Pasha, but on the banners released in May 2015 for the tour the location was changed to Kırklareli.
