= Aşk Kadın Ruhundan Anlamıyor =

Studio album by Hande Yener
- Released: 6 July 2004
- Genre: Pop
- Length: 70:45
- Label: Erol Köse

Hande Yener chronology
Sen Yoluna... Ben Yoluma... (2002)	Aşk Kadın Ruhundan Anlamıyor (2004)	Apayrı (2006)

Aşk Kadın Ruhundan Anlamıyor (Love Doesn't Understand A Woman's Soul) is the third studio album by Turkish singer Hande Yener. It was released on 6 July 2004 by Erol Köse Production. An album with pop rhythms, it was the singer's first studio album since the 2002 release of Sen Yoluna... Ben Yoluma.... Ten of the album's songs were written and composed by Alper Narman and Fettah Can, making them the two main songwriters and composers in the album. Alongside Narman and Can, Altan Çetin, Mete Özgencil and Sezen Aksu also wrote songs for the album. Hande Yener served as one of the album's producers, and the recordings took place in Hamburg and Istanbul.

Containing 16 songs in total, Aşk Kadın Ruhundan Anlamıyor received positive reviews from music critics. Hande Yener's style was praised and compared to that of Ajda Pekkan and Sezen Aksu. The album's lead single, "Acele Etme", was written by Altan Çetin, and it was accompanied by a music video, which was directed by Luca Tommassini and recorded in Rome. Following "Acele Etme", separate music videos were released for "Kırmızı", "Acı Veriyor", "Armağan", "Hoşgeldiniz" and "Bu Yüzden" respectively.

By selling 400,000 copies in 2004, Aşk Kadın Ruhundan Anlamıyor received a gold certification from MÜ-YAP and was given the Golden Award by İstanbul FM. At the end of 2009, the album ranked sixth on the list of best albums of the past decade by NTV. After its initial release in 2004, the album was put on sales in the music markets two more times on 3 May 2012 and 19 June 2012.

== Background and release ==
Hande Yener made her debut in 2000 with the release of Senden İbaret by Doğan Music Company, on which she had worked together with Altan Çetin. In 2002, her second studio album, Sen Yoluna... Ben Yoluma..., was released by Erol Köse Production. Altan Çetin prepared many of the album's songs, and Alper Narman and Fettah Can collaborated with her as well. A few months after releasing Sen Yoluna... Ben Yoluma..., Yener began preparations for her new studio album and did the initial recordings at the Istanbul Technical University studios. For the last parts, she went to Germany and did a section of the recording at Booya Music studio. Her team prepared their "most valuable" songs for the album.

After one and a half year of working, Hande Yener's third studio album, Aşk Kadın Ruhundan Anlamıyor, was released on 6 July 2004 by Erol Köse Production. For the album, which addresses the issue of "the fight that comes with love", Yener worked with Altan Çetin, Alper Narman and Fettah Can, alongside Mete Özgencil and Sezen Aksu, all of whom wrote and composed different pieces for this project. Narman and Can wrote 10 of the album's 14 new songs. Sezen Aksu worked with the two on writing the song "Armağan". Altan Çetin wrote and composed the songs "Acele Etme" and "Kırmızı", while Mete Özgencil prepared "Bir İz Gerek" and "Hoşgeldiniz". The songs were arranged by Altan Çetin, Ayhan Sayıner, Volga Tamöz, Devrim Karaoğlu, Ozan Çolakoğlu, Erdem Kınay and Mustafa Ceceli. The album features rhythms of pop music and its photographs were taken by Nihat Odabaşı.

After the release of Aşk Kadın Ruhundan Anlamıyor, which includes 16 songs, Hande Yener stated that she had become more professionalized and believed that she had been able to attract the attention of an audience with high intellectual capacity. The album sold 400,000 copies in the year it was released and received a gold certification from MÜ-YAP as well as a Golden Award from İstanbul FM. At the end of 2009, one of NTV's music judges, Selami Bilgiç, placed the album sixth on the list of best albums released over the past decade. After its initial release in 2004, the album was put on sales in the markets two more times on 3 May 2012 and 19 June 2012.

== Critical reception ==
Professional ratings
Review scores
Source	Rating
Can Sayın	(favorable)
Michael Kuyucu	(favorable)
Şafak Karaman	(favorable)
Tolga Akyıldız	(favorable)

Hande Yener's third studio album, Aşk Kadın Ruhundan Anlamıyor, received positive reviews from music critics, and the singer's style as well as her collaboration with Altan Çetin were praised. Sabah's Can Sayın found the album "successful", described "Kırmızı" as the "hit song" of summer, and named "Bir İz Gerek" as one of his favorite songs in the album. Radioman Michael Kuyucu described the album as a "high quality pop album that can appeal to high music tastes" and praised Yener's style, stating that each of her songs had its own "distinct flavor". He found the music style in some pieces similar to that of Ajda Pekkan and Sezen Aksu, and believed that Yener was on her way to become "Ajda Pekkan of the future". Another Sabah contributor, Şafak Karaman, wrote that Yener's name had to be mentioned "among the best singers" and cited her performance in the song "Acı Veriyor" as an evidence for his statement. He described Çetin and Yener as the "right kind of partners", and stated that while listening to the album it occasionally felt as if he was listening to Sezen Aksu. Hürriyet's Tolga Akyıldız also wrote a positive review for the album, praised Altan Çetin–Hande Yener collaboration and described the two songs written by Mete Özgencil as beautiful pieces. Music website Gerçek Pop wrote in its 2011 review that Yener had not received "most of what she deserves in her career" and mentioned that Aşk Kadın Ruhundan Anlamıyor deserved to sell one million copies.

== Music videos ==
Hande Yener released six music videos for Aşk Kadın Ruhundan Anlamıyor. The first music video was made for the song, "Acele Etme", written by Altan Çetin. It was directed by one of Madonna's dancers Luca Tommassini, and recorded in Rome, Italy. The music video was released in June 2004. "Acele Etme" ranked first on a number of radio and television lists in Turkey for weeks. The second music video was directed by Ömer Faruk Sorak and made for the song "Kırmızı". It was recorded in a kitchen and released in August 2004. "Kırmızı" ranked among the top three on music charts inside Turkey.

The third music video was made for the song "Acı Veriyor", written and composed by Alper Narman and Fettah Can. The video was recorded in a cemetery and directed by Deniz Akel. Arda Can appeared as Yener's partner in the video. Like its predecessors, this song also ranked among the top three on the music charts. The fourth music video was prepared for the song "Armağan", written by Sezen Aksu. It was directed by Luca Tommassini and released in January 2005. Two other music videos were released for the songs "Hoşgeldiniz" and "Bu Yüzden". The music video for "Hoşgeldiniz" was directed by the song's writer and composer Mete Özgencil.

== Track listing ==
No.	Title	Writer(s)	Composer(s)	Length
1.	"Kırmızı"	Altan Çetin	Çetin · Ayhan Sayıner	3:32
2.	"Bedenim Senin Oldu"	Alper Narman · Fettah Can	Volga Tamöz	4:59
3.	"Bir İz Gerek"	Mete Özgencil	Devrim Karaoğlu	5:07
4.	"Acele Etme"	Çetin	Çetin · Sayıner	5:07
5.	"Bu Yüzden"	Narman · Can	Tamöz	3:25
6.	"24 Saat"	Narman · Can	Ozan Çolakoğlu	4:21
7.	"Armağan"	Narman · Can · Sezen Aksu	Erdem Kınay	4:15
8.	"Hoşgeldiniz"	Özgencil	Karaoğlu	3:52
9.	"Yanındaki Var Ya"	Narman · Can	Tamöz	4:20
10.	"Acı Veriyor"	Çetin	Çetin	5:24
11.	"Acısı Çıkıyor"	Narman · Can	Tamöz	3:40
12.	"Savaş Sonrası"	Narman · Can	Tamöz	5:25
13.	"Bence Mutluyduk"	Narman · Can	Tamöz	3:53
14.	"Aşk Kadın Ruhundan Anlamıyor"	Narman · Can	Mustafa Ceceli	4:28
15.	"Savaş Sonrası" (CD Extra Version)	Narman · Can	Karaoğlu	4:47
16.	"24 Saat" (CD Extra Version)	Narman · Can	Tamöz	4:10
Total length:				70:45

== Personnel ==
- Erol Köse (Erol Köse Production) – producer
- Üçüncü Göz Communication Consultancy Ltd. – production, public relations and management
- Hande Yener – artist, producer, main vocals
- Alper Narman – songwriter, composer, vocals
- Fettah Can – songwriter, composer, vocals
- Altan Çetin – songwriter, composer, arranger, vocals
- Mete Özgencil – songwriter, composer
- Sezen Aksu – songwriter, composer
- Ayhan Sayıner – general voice engineer, arranger, recording, mixing, synth, computer programming
- Volga Tamöz – arranger, intro, drums, clavier, vocals, piano, electric guitar, percussion
- Devrim Karaoğlu – arranger, mixing, recording
- Mustafa Ceceli – arranger
- Ozan Çolakoğlu – arranger
- Erdem Kınay – arranger
- Bülent Aris – sound controller, recording, mixing
- Barış Büyük – mixing
- Çağrı Kodamonoğlu (ITU Miam) – mixing
- ITU Miam (Istanbul) – studio
- Booya Music (Hamburg) – studio
- Erekli Tunç (Istanbul) – studio
- Sanev – studio
- Özgür Yurtoğlu – recording
- Ünal (Malika Records) – recording
- Master & Servant (Hamburg) – mastering
- Erdem Sökmen – guitar
- Özcan Şenyaylar – violin
- Mehmet Akatay – percussion, goblet drum, bendir, daf, zill, bongo drum
- Cengiz Ercümer – percussion, goblet drum, bendir, daf, zill, bongo drum
- Gündem Yaylı Grubu – bowed string instruments
- Hakan Güngör – qanun
- Hüsnü Şenlendirici – clarinet
- Yıldıran Güz – oud
- Can Şengün – e-guitar
- Jörg Sandler – e-guitar
- Hüseyin Delen – clarinet
- Birkan Şener – bass guitar
- Timur Atasever – cello
- Ali Güven – vocals
- Bilgehan – vocals
- Demet – vocals
- Sıla – vocals
- Selin Yiğit – vocals
- Özlem Yüksekoğlu – vocals
- Canan Kaplan – vocals
- Bilgehan Öziş – assistant engineer
- Soner Şeker – assistant engineer
- Ozan Murat – assistant engineer
- Nihan Bilgen – assistant engineer
- Nihat Odabaşı – photographer
- Kemal Doğulu – hair stylist
- İlker Akyol – hair stylist
- Çiğdem Yartaşı – make-up
- Sanem Habib – stylist and creative consultant
- Atelier Works – design
- FRS – printing

Credits adapted from Aşk Kadın Ruhundan Anlamıyor's album booklet.

== Release history ==
Country	Date	Format	Label
Turkey	6 July 2004	CD · cassette · digital download	Erol Köse Production
Worldwide	6 July 2004	Digital download	Üçüncü Göz Production
Turkey	3 May 2012	CD (reissue)	Erol Köse Production
Turkey	19 June 2012	CD (reissue)	Erol Köse Production
