= Senden İbaret =

Studio album by Hande Yener
- Released: 31 May 2000
- Studio: DMC Studios, Istanbul
- Genre: Pop
- Length: 46:19
- Label: DMC
- Producer: Ercan Saatçi

Hande Yener chronology
Senden İbaret (2000)	Extra (2001)

Senden İbaret (Including You) is the first studio album by Turkish singer Hande Yener. It was released on 31 May 2000 by DMC.

Yener worked on the album together with Altan Çetin, and with the release of the music video for "Yalanın Batsın" she succeeded in earning fame. She continued this success through releasing two more music videos: "Bunun Adı Ayrılık" and "Yoksa Mani".

Due to her successful breakthrough, she received the "Best Newcomer Artist of the Year" award at the Golden Butterfly Awards in November 2000. Yener also received the "Best Newcomer Female Artist" award at the 9th Kral TV Video Music Awards in 2001. The album sold 750,000 copies within the scope of one year.

== Track listing ==
No.	Title	Writer(s)	Composer(s)	Length
1.	"Yalanın Batsın"	Altan Çetin	Altan Çetin	4:40
2.	"Bunun Adı Ayrılık"	Altan Çetin	Altan Çetin	4:41
3.	"Güvenemiyorum"	Altan Çetin	Altan Çetin	4:36
4.	"Yoksa Mani"	Altan Çetin	Altan Çetin	4:35
5.	"Haykırdım Seni"	Hakan Altun	Hakan Altun	4:33
6.	"Senden İbaret"	Altan Çetin	Altan Çetin	4:55
7.	"Anlamadın ki"	Altan Çetin	Altan Çetin	5:51
8.	"Bitmesin Bu Rüya"	Ercan Saatçi	Ozan Doğulu	3:49
9.	"Güvenemiyorum" (Remix)	Altan Çetin	Altan Çetin	4:02
10.	"Yalanın Batsın" (Vers. 2)	Altan Çetin	Altan Çetin	4:40
Total length:				46:19

== Personnel ==
- Hande Yener – main vocals
- Altan Çetin – songwriter, composer, arranger, music director
- Ercan Saatçi – producer, songwriter, backing vocals
- Hakan Altun – songwriter, composer
- Ozan Doğulu – composer
- Ercüment Vural – arranger, backing vocals
- Volkan Şanda – arranger, backing vocals
- Özgür Yedievli – arranger
- Serdar Ağırlı – mixing, mastering
- Eyüp Hamiş – ney
- Serdar Mumbuç – guitar
- Hüsnü Şenlendirici – trumpet
- Cüneyt Coşkuner – violin
- Erdoğan Şenyaylar – violin
- Fahri Karaduman – violin
- Mehmet Şenyaylar – violin
- Murat Süngü – violin
- Tarık Kemancı – violin
- Özcan Şenyaylar – violin
- Murat Başaran – recording
- Berna Anter – backing vocals
- Berna Keser – backing vocals
- Reha Felay – backing vocals
- Cemil Ağacıkoğlu – photography
- İzzet Angel – art director
- Gayer DMC – graphic design

Credits adapted from Senden İbaret's album booklet.
