= Demet Akalın discography =

Artist discography

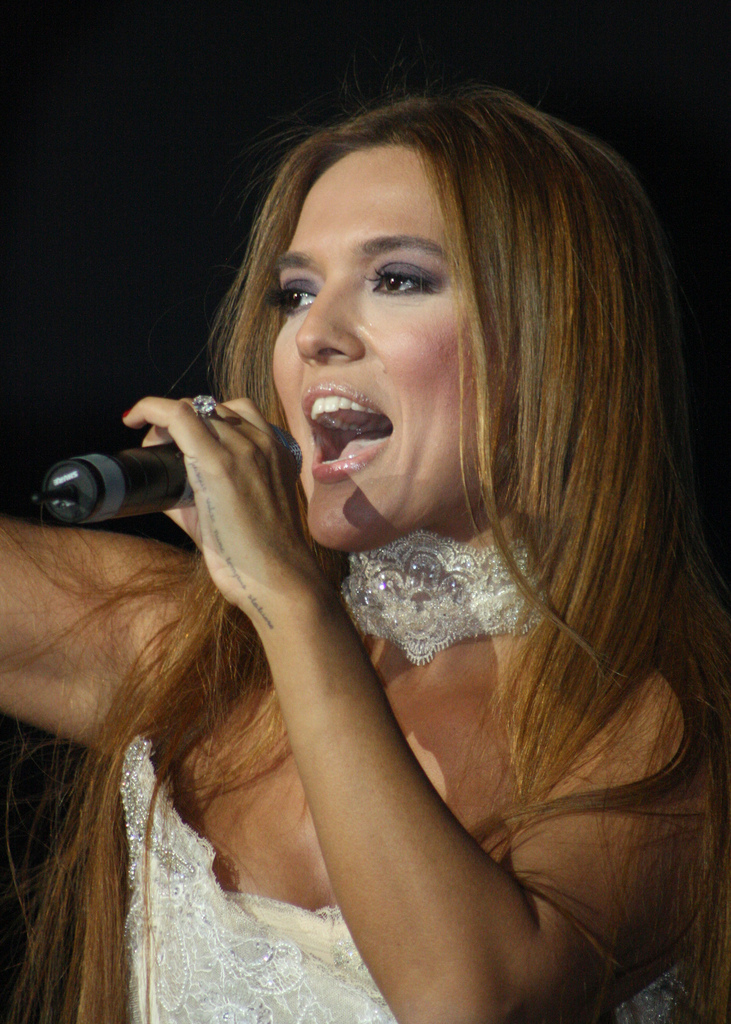
- Akalın in 2011
- Studio albums: 11
- EPs: 3
- Singles: 3
- Music videos: 73

This is the discography of Turkish pop singer Demet Akalın, who has released ten studio albums, three extended plays (EP) and numerous singles.

== Albums ==
=== Studio albums ===
List of studio albums
Title	Album details	Certifications	Sales
Sebebim (My Reason)	Released: 18 September 1996; Label: Elenor plak Müzik; Format: Cassette, CD, digital download		
Unuttum (I've Forgotten)	Released: 30 May 2003; Label: Peker Müzik Productions; Format: Cassette, CD, digital download		
Banane (I Don't Care)	Released: 12 December 2004; Label: Seyhan Müzik Productions; Format: Cassette, CD, digital download		40,000
Kusursuz 19 (The Perfect 19)	Released: 14 June 2006; Label: Seyhan Müzik Productions; Format: Cassette, CD, digital download	MÜ-YAP: Gold	147,000
Dans Et (Dance)	Released: 1 March 2008; Label: Seyhan Müzik Productions; Format: Cassette, CD, digital download	MÜ-YAP: Gold	128,000
Zirve (Peak)	Released: 23 April 2010; Label: Seyhan Müzik Productions; Format: Cassette, CD, digital download		83,000
Giderli 16 (Break Up 16)	Released: 19 November 2012; Label: Seyhan Müzik Productions; Format: CD, digital download		69,993
Rekor (Record)	Released: 23 April 2014; Label: Seyhan Müzik Productions; Format: CD, digital download		89,971
Pırlanta (Diamond)	Released: 19 June 2015; Label: Doğan Music Company; Format: CD, digital download	DMC: Gold	105,000
Rakipsiz (Unrivaled)	Released: 7 November 2016; Label: Doğan Music Company; Format: CD, digital download		70,000
Ateş (Fire)	Released: 18 April 2019; Label: Doğan Music Company; Format: CD, digital download		

=== Extended plays ===
List of extended plays
Title	EP details	Sales
Yalan Sevdan (Your Untrue Love)	Released: 13 June 2000; Label: Şahin Özer Productions; Format: CD, digital download	
Aşk (Love)	Released: 24 May 2011; Label: Seyhan Müzik Productions; Format: CD, digital download	40,000
D-POP	Released: 10 May 2024; Label: Doğan Music Company; Format: digital download	

=== Joint albums ===
List of joint albums
Title	Album details
Yanan Ateşi Söndürdük (We Quenched the Burning Flame) (with Fettah Can)	Released: 14 February 2011; Label: Seyhan Müzik Productions; Format: CD, digital download
Melekler İmza Topluyor (Angels Collect Signature) (with Alişan)	Released: 18 November 2011; Label: Kaya Müzik Productions; Format: CD, digital download
Ala (Superb) (with Işın Karaca, Deniz Seki and Cansu Kurtçu)	Released: 24 February 2020; Label: DMC; Format: CD, digital download

== Singles ==
List of singles as lead artist
Title	Year	Album
"Tatil"	2007	Non-album single
"Toz Pembe"	2009	Non-album single
"Farkında mısın?"	2012	Orhan Gencebay ile Bir Ömür
"İşte Gidiyorum Çeşm-i Siyahım" (with Ahmet Aslan)	2017	Mahzuni'ye Saygı
"Canıma da Değsin"	2018	Non-album single
"Aşk Laftan Anlamaz Ki"	2018	Yıldız Tilbe'nin Yıldızlı Şarkıları
"Hatıram Olsun"	2018	Ahmet Selçuk İlkan Unutulmayan Şarkılar, Vol. 4
"Nostalji"	2020	Non-album single
"Kahır"	2020	Non-album single
"Bi Daha Bi Daha"	2021	Non-album single
"Çukur"	2022	Non-album single
"Gidecek Bir Gün"	2023	Non-album single
"Bana Yolla"	2023	Non-album single
"Aferin Bana"	2024	Non-album single
"Büyük Oyun" (with Ersay Üner)	2024	Non-album single
"Yerine Sevemem" (with Galip Öztürk)	2024	Non-album single
"Yerinde Dur" (with Sefo)	2025	Non-album single

List of singles as featured artist
Title	Year	Album
"Sevgililer Günü" (with Emirkan)	2009	Çok Fena
"Taksi" (with Tan Taşçı)	2010	Taş Yürek
"Rota" (with Erdem Kınay)	2012	Proje
"Emanet" (with Erdem Kınay)	2012	Proje
"Yalnız Ordusu" (with Erdem Kınay)	2013	Proje 2
"Nefsi Müdafaa" (with Gökhan Özen)	2014	Non-album single
"İntikam" (with Emrah Karaduman)	2015	Toz Duman
"Vazgeçilmezim" (with Sinan Akçıl)	2015	Ayıp Yani
"Oh Olsun" (with Ömer Topçu)	2018	Non-album single
"Kulüp" (with Ozan Doğulu)	2018	130 Bpm Forte
"Ses Kes" (with Emrah Karaduman)	2018	BombarDuman
"Yalan" (with Sinan Akçıl)	2022	Piyanist 2
"Bensiz Olsun"	2022	Serdar Ortaç Şarkıları, Vol. 1
"Cennet"	2024	Bülent Özdemir Şarkıları
"Yalan mı"	2025	Hakkı Yalçın Şarkıları, Vol. 1

== Charts ==
List of singles, release date and album name
Single	Year	Peak	Album
Single	Year	TR	Album
"Afedersin"	2006	1	Kusursuz 19
"Herkes Hakettiği Gibi Yaşıyor"	2006	—	Kusursuz 19
"Mucize"	2008	1	Dans Et
"Bebek"	2008	17	Dans Et
"Selam Söyle"	2008	18	Dans Et
"Toz Pembe"	2009	1	Toz Pembe
"Tecrübe"	2010	1	Zirve
"Evli, Mutlu, Çocuklu"	2010	13	Zirve
"Çanta"	2010	3	Zirve
"Bozuyorum Yeminimi"	2010	19	Zirve
"Olacak Olacak"	2011	2	Zirve
"Sabıka"	2011	5	Aşk
"İlahi Adalet"	2014	2	Rekor
"Ders Olsun"	2015	2	Pırlanta
"Hayalet"	2016	1	Rakipsiz
"Ah Ulan Sevda"	2017	7	Rakipsiz
"Nazar"	2017	6	Rakipsiz
"Canıma da Değsin"	2018	5	Non-album single
"—" indicates that the songs were not included in the lists or the results were not disclosed.
