= Giderli 16 =

Studio album by Demet Akalın
- Released: 19 November 2012
- Genre: Pop
- Length: 1:12:59
- Label: Seyhan Müzik
- Producer: Bülent Seyhan

Demet Akalın chronology
Aşk (2011)	Giderli 16 (2012)	Rekor (2014)

Giderli 16 (Break Up 16) is the seventh studio album by Turkish singer Demet Akalın. It was released on 19 November 2012 by Seyhan Müzik.

== Background and promotion ==
For this album, Akalın worked with a number of different artists, including Sinan Akçıl, Ersay Üner, Gökhan Şahin, Emrah Karaduman, Altan Çetin, Gökhan Özen, Ayla Çelik, Gökhan Tepe, Ceyhun Çelikten, Hakan Tunçbilek, Emirkan, Özcan Deniz, Günay Çoban, Niran Ünsal, Murat Güneş, Cansu Kurtçu, Deniz Erten, Erhan Bayrak, and Suat Aydoğan. To promote the album, Akalın began a tour of concerts, starting at locations such as the Zincirlikuyu Airport.

== Achievements and critical reception ==
By early December, the album became the best-selling album of the month. It eventually sold 69,000 copies in Turkey, becoming the ninth best-selling album of the year. In January 2013, TTNET Müzik named her the national artist with the most number of streams in the country. The critics stated that Akalın had continued to repeat the style of her previous works in this album and that she was making commercial-like music to sell out the album. Ersay Üner was featured on the lead single "Yılan". The song "Türkan", which was written as a tribute to Türkan Şoray, was chosen as the Best Song at the Turkey Music Awards and the 40th Golden Butterfly Awards. After these two songs, new music videos for "Giderli Şarkılar", "Yıkıl Karşımdan" (feat. Gökhan Özen), "Kalbindeki İmza", "Sepet", "Nasip Değilmiş" (duet with Özcan Deniz) and "Felaket" were released.

== Track listing ==
No.	Title	Lyrics	Music	Arrangement	Length
1.	"Ne Büyük Aşk"	Sinan Akçıl	Sinan Akçıl	Tolga Kılıç	4:07
2.	"Yılan"	Ersay Üner	Ersay Üner	Erhan Bayrak	3:58
3.	"Giderli Şarkılar"	Gökhan Şahin	Emrah Karaduman	Erhan Bayrak	4:39
4.	"Lades"	Altan Çetin	Altan Çetin	Erhan Bayrak	4:36
5.	"Yıkıl Karşımdan"	Gökhan Özen	Gökhan Özen	Gökhan Özen	4:31
6.	"Türkan"	Ayla Çelik	Gökhan Tepe	Erhan Bayrak	4:38
7.	"Kalbindeki İmza"	Ceyhun Çelikten	Ceyhun Çelikten	Ceyhun Çelikten	4:00
8.	"Felaket"	Ceyhun Çelikten, Hakan Tunçbilek	Ceyhun Çelikten	Ceyhun Çelikten	3:40
9.	"Yıkıl Karşımdan" (Erhan Bayrak Version)	Gökhan Özen	Gökhan Özen	Erhan Bayrak	4:37
10.	"Son Sözüm Aşk"	Demet Akalın, Emirkan	Emirkan	Erhan Bayrak	4:08
11.	"Nasip Değilmiş"	Günay Çoban	Niran Ünsal	Selim Çaldıran	3:50
12.	"Bir Oğlumuz Var"	Murat Güneş	Murat Güneş	Suat Aydoğan	4:43
13.	"Ağlıyorum"	Cansu Kurtçu	Cansu Kurtçu	Enver Günen	4:28
14.	"Ah Sevgilim"	Deniz Erten	Reşit Gözdamla	Erhan Bayrak	4:05
15.	"Yeşil"	Murat Güneş	Murat Güneş	Suat Aydoğan	4:25
16.	"Aşk Yuvamız"	Murat Güneş	Murat Güneş	Suat Aydoğan	4:15
17.	"Sepet"	Ersay Üner	Ersay Üner	Suat Aydoğan	4:21
Total length:					1:12:59

== Personnel ==
- Supervisor: Demet Akalın
- Producer: Bülent Seyhan, Fuat Seyhan
- Music Director: Erhan Bayrak
- Coordinator: Seyfi Yerlikaya
- Hair: Erkan Kurtses
- Outfits: Gazzas Grafik, Savaş Avcı, Özlem Kaya
- Mastering: Levent Demirbaş
- Photographs: Müjdat Küpşi
- Styling: Bener Hamamcı
- Graphic Design: Özlem Semiz
- Printing: FRS
- Studios: Seyhan Müzik

== Sales ==
Country	Sales
Turkey (MÜ-YAP)	69,993
