= Ceylan (singer) =

Turkish musical artist (born 1974)

- Also known as: Küçük Ceylan (Little Ceylan)
- Born: Ceylan Avcı; 25 June 1974 (age 51); Istanbul, Turkey
- Genres: Arabesque, Turkish folk
- Occupation: Singer
- Years active: 1984–present

Ceylan Avcı (born 26 June 1974) is a Turkish singer, arranger, television presenter and actress. Her mother is from Bayburt, Bayburt Province, and her father is from Pertek, Tunceli Province. She emigrated to North Rhine-Westphalia, Duisburg, West Germany with her family at the age of 8 and lived there until she was 15. in 1990, she returned to Turkey with her family. Ceylan started her career in 1984 as a child singer and actress. She started her career by taking recurring roles in a number of movies and released her own studio albums. Her 1986 album, Seni Sevmeyen Ölsün, sold 1.3 million copies in Turkey. Her 2005 album, Ah Gönlüm, received a gold certification from Mü-Yap. She has twice won Best Female Folk Singer at the Kral TV Video Music Awards. She hosted a 2012–2016 years of music television talk show under the name of Ceylan Show that aired on Kanal 7 and Samanyolu TV.

== Albums ==
- Yaktı Beni (feat. Ferdi Tayfur, 1984, Şah Plak)
- Bir Gün Bana Döneceksin (1984, Şah Plak)
- Kaderin Tuzakları (1985, Şah Plak)
- Yolun Açık Olsun/Garip Anam (1985, Şah Plak)
- Seni Sevmeyen Ölsün (1986, Şah Plak)
- Sevmek Günah mı/Asker Türküsü (1986, Şah Plak)
- Bırakmam Seni (1987, Şah Plak)
- Sev Beni Seveyim Seni (1988, Şah Plak)
- Sana da Güvenilmez/Ağlama Yar (1988, Şah Plak)
- Vallah/Hep Ezildim (1989, Ceylan Music)
- Allah Aşkına (1989, Cem Music)
- Kadersiz Doğmuşum/Arabacı (1990, Ceylan Music)
- Beni Bende Bitirdiler (1990, Ceylan Music)
- Gurbet Yolcusu (1991, Şenay Music)
- Hayret Nasıl Yaşıyorum (1991, Bayar Music)
- Geri Ver Beni (1992, Bayar Music)
- Şantaj/Montaj (1993, Özdemir Plak)
- Kritik Etme Beni (1994, Özdemir Plak)
- Kır Çiçeğim/Ayrılmam (1995, Özdemir Plak)
- Canımdan Ayırdılar (1996, Kral Müzik)
- Güldestim (1997, Prestij Music)
- Ağlayı Ağlayı/Le Le Kirvo (1998, A1 Music)
- Zeyno (feat. İbrahim Tatlıses, 2000, İdobay Music)
- Can Cana (2001, Universal Musics Records)
- Söyle (2003, Raks Music)
- Gelsene (feat. Orhan Ölmez, 13 January 2004, Ölmez Music)
- Ah Gönlüm (8 April 2005, Özdemir Plak) (certificate: Golden)
- Pirimi Ararım (1 September 2006, Popüler Music)
- Sana Söz (23 March 2007, Özdemir Plak)
- Bir Daha mı? (10 November 2008, Özdemir Plak)
- Türkülerin Ceylan'ı (2009, Seyhan Müzik)
- Ceylan Arabesk (2011)
- Kendisi Lazım (feat. Ankaralı Namık, 2012)
- Hım Hım Yar (Entarisi Dım Dım Yar) (2014)
- Bana Bir Şey Söyle (2014)
- Ceylan'dan 2016 (2016, Ceylan Music)

== Singles ==
- "Çeker Giderim" (2014, Uzelli Casette)
- "Koptum Bu Gece" (2017, Divan Music)
- "Kara Kız Kurbanın Olim" (2017, Zara Music)
- "Tillillo" (2018, TMC Music)
- "Severim Ama Güvenemem ki" (2019, feat. Melodi Bozkurt, Kalan Music)
- "Mamudo 2019" (feat. Mahzuni Şerif, 2019, Kemal Aslan Music)
- "Cennetim Ol" (2019, Olimpiyat Media Music)
- "İlle de Sen" (feat. Azer Bülbül, 2020, Seyhan Müzik)
- "Ne Feryat Edersin Divane Bülbül" (2020, GAM Music)
- "Bir Sivaslı Uğruna" (2020, Emrah Music)
- "Islanmış Kirpiklerin" (2021, Major Music)
- "Birileri Kandırmış" (feat. Yunus Bülbül, 2021, Minareci Plaque)
- "Mashup" (2021, Melankolia Music)
- "Senin Kadar Hiç Kimseyi Sevmedim" (2021, Poll Production)
- "Eski Tadım Yok Artık" (feat. Uğur Işılak, 2021, Ferdfion Music)
- "Sen Affetsen Ben Affetmem" (feat. Emrah, 2022, UKopuz Music)
- "Yansın Ankara" (2022, Turkuola Music)
- "Van'a Gel Muş'a Gel" (2022)
- "Ne Sayarsan Say" (2022)
- "Pişmanlıklar Diliyorum" (feat. Devran Şengümüş, 2022)
- "Ne Gelirse Sevdadan Gelir" (2023)
- "Cane" (2023)
- "Ankara mı Yanacak?" (feat. Dodo, 2023)
- "Sormaz mıyım?" (feat. Alişan, 2024)
- "Artık Ağlamam" (2024)
- "Artık Ağlamam (Akustik)" (2024)
- "Seyfo" (2024)
- "Halay (Potpori)" (2024)
- "Sensiz Yaşamaya Alışacağım" (2024)
- "İçime Atıyorum Aşk" (2025)

== Awards and nominations ==
Year	Award	Category	Result
1987	Music Magazine Awards		Won
1988	Music Magazine Awards		Won
1995	1st Kral TV Video Music Awards	Best Female Arabesque Artist	Nominated
1998	4th Kral TV Video Music Awards	Best Female Folk Artist	Nominated
1999	5th Kral TV Video Music Awards	Best Female Folk Artist	Won
2001	7th Kral TV Video Music Awards	Best Female Folk Artist	Won
2001	MGD 8th Altın Objective Awards	Music Star	Won
2002	8th Kral TV Video Music Awards	Best Female Folk Artist	Nominated
2005	11th Kral TV Video Music Awards	Best Female Folk Artist	Nominated
2006	4th MÜ-YAP Awards	Golden Award (Ah Gönlüm)	Won
2006	12th Kral TV Video Music Awards	Best Female Arabesque-Fantezi Artist	Nominated
2008	14th Kral TV Video Music Awards	Best Female Folk Artist	Nominated
2017	17th Magazinci.com Awards	Female Folk Artist of the Year	Won
2018	8th Buhara Medya Awards	Folk Artist of the Year	Won
