= Rakipsiz =

Studio album by Demet Akalın
- Released: 7 November 2016
- Recorded: 2016
- Genre: Pop
- Length: 59:05
- Label: DMC
- Producer: Samsun Demir

Demet Akalın chronology
Pırlanta (2015)	Rakipsiz (2016)	Ateş (2019)

Rakipsiz (Unrivaled) is the tenth studio album by Turkish singer Demet Akalın. It was released on 7 November 2016 by Doğan Music Company. A music video for the album's lead single "Hayalet" was also released on the same day. The album ranked first on D&R's Best-Selling list in Turkey.

== Background ==
For her previous album Pırlanta, which was released in June 2015, Akalın made six different music videos. To collect new songs for this album Akalın worked with the likes of Sinan Akçıl and Volga Tamöz. To mark the anniversary of the 20th year of her career, she published the album's name and cover on her social media accounts.

The photographs for Rakipsiz were taken by Müjdat Kupsi. During the album's preparation process Akalın continued to share sections of the songs on social media, and the album's final teaser was released by the production company DMC on YouTube, one night before its eventual distribution.

== Music and lyrics ==
To mark the 20th year of her career, Akalın worked with many artists, including Ayla Çelik, Berkay, Berksan, Buray, Berk Telkıvıran, Çağrı Telkıvıran, Erdem Kınay, Erhan Bayrak, Gökhan Özen, Gökhan Tepe, Gülşen, Gözde Ançel, Reşit Gözdamla, Murat Güneş, Murat Yeter, Okan Akı, Ozan Çolakoğlu, Özlem Argon, Sinan Akçıl, Sirel, Şebnem Sungur, Taşkın Sabah, Turaç Berkay Özer and Volga Tamöz. Akalın, who had worked on the album for two years, described it as "a satisfying work". Considered a pop album, Rakipsiz contains sixteen songs. Akalın also announced on her Twitter account that in the lead song "Hayalet", Edis was featured as a backing vocalist. The song was written and composed by Gülşen. In the song "Gazino", written and composed by Sirel, Mehmet Ali Erbil and Fatih Ürek's audio samples were used. Sinan Akçıl wrote and composed the song "Dürbün" and his vocals were featured at the song's beginning.

== Critical reception ==
Milliyet's Ali Eyüboğlu liked the album and pointed out that it was released "to not just be a profit, but to make a name" and added: "There are no vain songs in the album because it's a great thing to be able to listen to 16 songs by other artists on an album by a singer who doesn't write and compose them." Writing for Habertürk, Oben Budak gave "the album that Demet Akalın has worked for a lot" a positive review and added: "This time the album's 'expense' portion is at maximum level. [...] We can call her the best song collector. There's a lot of things Demet has added to the songs [with her voice], but she has an ear that can easily find the compositions that could become hits." Hürriyet's Naim Dilmener gave the album three out of five stars and wrote: "An album full of songs that are generally accepted and viewed as 'Demet Akalın sound', although there are some light touches or interventions added to the musical structures of the songs." Akşam's Esin Övet also wrote: "With the right song choices, we can go through many more years with the songs of Demet Akalın, and cry and laugh with them."

== Release ==
At a concert for Rakipsiz's promotion, Akalın talked about Gülşen's decision to give her a new song for the album: "I didn't expect it from Gülşen, but she said it's your twentieth year. I'll postpone the album's release until I receive the song from her, and I value her work because she's a master when it comes to songwriting." On 7 November 2016, the album was made available on Spotify. On the same day, the physical sales for the album began. In an interview with Özge Ulusoy on Lifetime Turkey she said: "We didn't postpone the album's release because of Gülşen's song, Gülşen added the song to the album when it was ready." She insisted that the song had been prepared since a long time ago and said that there was a misunderstanding.

== Promotion ==
To promote Rakipsiz, Akalın released a music video for its lead single "Hayalet" on 11 November. The album's cover appeared on a number of billboards in Istanbul. Later on 13 November, Akalın performed "Hayalet" at the 43rd Golden Butterfly Awards. It was followed by music videos for the songs "Ah Ulan Sevda", "Nazar", "Damga Damga", and "Bu Defa Son".

== Track listing ==
No.	Title	Writer(s)	Composer(s)	Length
1.	"Hayalet"	Gülşen	Gülşen	3:43
2.	"Nazar"	Gökhan Özen	Gökhan Özen	3:17
3.	"Altın Kafes"	Özlem Argo and demet akalin	Reşit Gözdamla tugba ozerk and demet akalin	3:39
4.	"50 Cevapsız Arama"	Berksan and demet akalin	Turaç Berkay Özer yildiz tilbe and demet akalin	2:49
5.	"Damga Damga"	Murat Güneş and demet akalin	Volga Tamöz betul demir and demet akalin	3:37
6.	"Gazino"	Murat Yeter and demet akalin	Sirel tugba ozerk and demet akalin	4:05
7.	"Ah Ulan Sevda"	Ayla Çelik	Gökhan Tepe	3:51
8.	"Vereceksen Ver"	Şebnem Sungur	Ayla Çelik & Gökhan Tepe	3:51
9.	"Bu Defa Son"	Gözde Ançel	Buray	3:38
10.	"Cinayet"	Gökhan Özen	Gökhan Özen	4:19
11.	"Dürbün"	Sinan Akçıl	Sinan Akçıl	3:21
12.	"Rakipsiz"	Murat Güneş	Volga Tamöz	3:38
13.	"Kaybedenler Kulübü"	Gökhan Özen	Gökhan Özen	3:35
14.	"Hürmetler"	Murat Güneş	Volga Tamöz	3:24
15.	"Tabu"	Berkay	Berk Telkıvıran	4:01
16.	"Efeler"	Ayla Çelik	Ayla Çelik	3:41
Total length:				59:05

== Personnel ==
- Production: Doğan Music Company
- Producer: Okan Kurt
- Supervisor: Demet Akalın
- General coordinator: Özden Bora
- Photography and cover designing: Müjdat Küpşi
- Styling: Bener Hamamcı
- General design of cardboard: Özlem Semiz
- Printing: GD Ofset
- Studios: Kaya Müzik, Yeters & Lonca, Volga Tamöz's Studio, Bayrak Record's, KNY Müzik Production (Erdem Kınay), Marşandiz Studios, Soundcheck Music PROD, Stüdyo Hiperaktif

== Charts ==
Chart (2016)	Peak position
Turkey (D&R Best-Selling)	1

== Sales ==
Country	Sales
Turkey (MÜ-YAP)	70,000

== Release history ==
Country	Date	Format(s)	Label	Ref.
Turkey	7 November 2016	CD · digital download	Doğan Music Company	
Worldwide	11 November 2016	Digital download	Doğan Music Company	
