= Demet Akalın =

Turkish singer

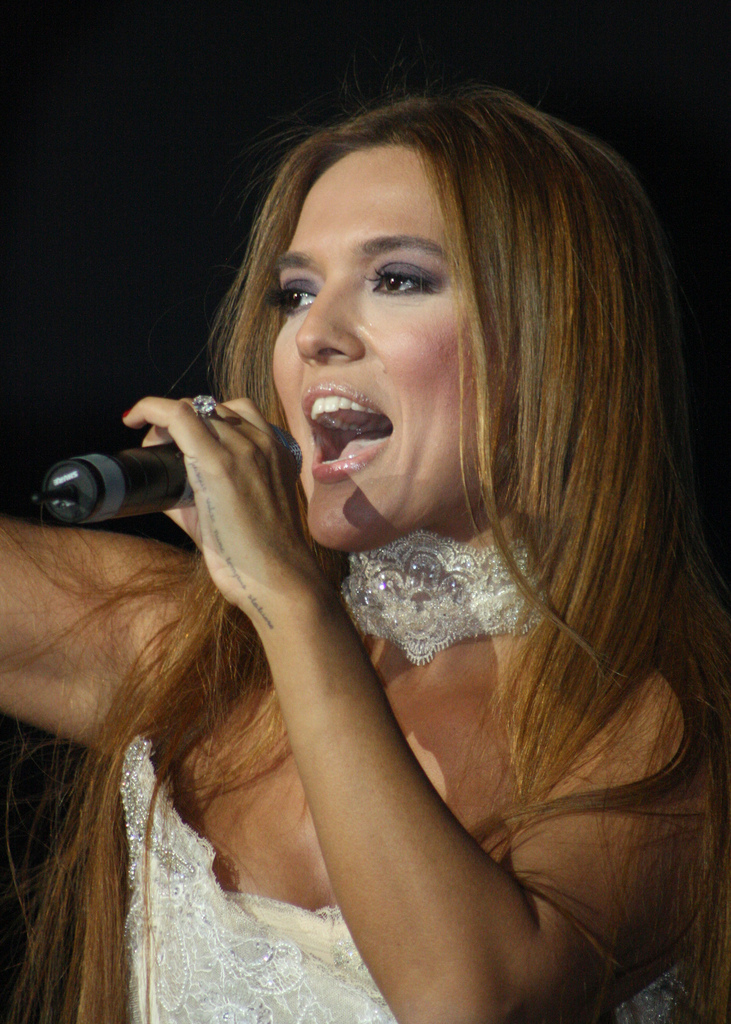
- Akalın in 2011
- Born: 23 April 1972 (age 54); Gölcük, Kocaeli, Turkey
- Education: Gölcük Barbaros Hayrettin Lisesi
- Occupations: Singer; model (formerly); TV presenter
- Spouses: Oğuz Kayhan (m. 2006; div. 2006) Önder Bekensir (m. 2010; div. 2010) Okan Kurt (m. 2012; div. 2018)
- Children: 1
- Musical career
- Genres: Dance; pop
- Years active: 1996–present
- Labels: Elenor; Şahin Özer; Ozan; Seyhan; DMC

Demet Akalın (born 23 April 1972) is a Turkish singer and former model. Due to the popular songs she has released since the middle of the 2000s, she has become a prominent figure in Turkish pop music.

Akalın, who was born in Gölcük, Kocaeli, initially decided to pursue a career in modeling and started working as a model for Neşe Erberk's agency. She also acted in a number of motion picture films and television series in the 1990s. Simultaneously with modeling, she started singing in the casinos, and released her first studio album, Sebebim in 1996 which was not successful. With the release of the album Banane in 2004, she became well-known in Turkey. The album's lead single, "Aşkın Açamadığı Kapı", earned Akalın a Turkey Music Award for the Song of the Year. Kusursuz 19 (2006) received a gold certification from Mü-Yap and with the success of Dans Et (2008), she became one of the influential figures of Turkish pop music. Her album Pırlanta was the best-selling album in Turkey, in 2015. Many of her songs, including "Afedersin", "Mucize", "Toz Pembe" and "Hayalet", have been number-one hits in Turkey. Other songs such as "Tecrübe", "Çanta", "Olacak Olacak", "Sabıka", "İlahi Adalet" and "Ders Olsun" have ranked among the top 5 on Turkey's music charts.

Akalın, who is considered by music critics to have a distinctive musical style, has appeared on the cover of magazines and has been the subject of tabloid reports. From 2007 to 2018, she was in an on and off feud with Hande Yener, and their arguments were covered in the tabloids. After her marriages to Oğuz Kayhan in 2006 and Önder Bekensir in 2010 ended in divorce, she married Okan Kurt in 2012 and the couple's first child Hira was born in 2014. The couple divorced in 2018. She has won two Golden Butterfly Awards and four Kral Turkey Music Awards, and has received numerous other awards and nominations.

== Life and career ==
=== 1972–96: Early life and career beginnings ===
Demet Akalın was born on 23 April 1972 to Ali and Şenay Akalın in Gölcük, Kocaeli. Her paternal family has Laz ancestry, while her maternal grandmother, Iffet Hanim (1912–2011), was of Tatar descent and her maternal grandfather was of Bosniak descent. She attended primary and secondary schools in Gölcük and eventually got enrolled in Gölcük Barbaros Hayrettin Lisesi. With the help of her mother, she took modeling courses with Yaşar Alptekin. She subsequently joined Neşe Erberk's modeling agency. Meanwhile, she acted in a number of movies and TV series including Günlerden Pazar (1992), Tele Anahtar (1994) and Sensiz Olmaz (1994). She also appeared in a TV movie titled Hayatın Anlamı alongside Ece Sükan.

=== 1996–2005: Sebebim, Unuttum and Banane ===
While continuing her modeling career, Akalın started to sing in casinos. In September 1996, her first studio album Sebebim (My Reason) was released by Elenor Plak. The songs were a mix of pop and Arabesque. Naim Dilmener wrote in his review for Hürriyet that Akalın was still inexperienced and her shaky vocals made the album poorly received. The album's lead single, "Sebebim", was written by Seda Akay and Niran Ünsal, for which a music video was released. Two other music videos were made for the songs "Asla Affedilmez" and "Sakın Vazgeçme". In 1998, Akalın got a role as Deniz in one episode of Kanal D's TV series Sibel.

In June 2000, her first EP Yalan Sevdan was released by Şahin Özer Müzik. A music video was made for the EP's song "Senin Anan Güzel mi?", which became Akalın's first hit in Turkey and Sırma Karasu of Habertürk later praised the song as one of the earliest examples of modern Turkish pop music. Akalın's second studio album Unuttum (I've Forgotten) was produced by Peker Müzik and released in June 2003. All of the new songs in the album were written by Ersay Üner and three music videos were made for the album's lead single, "Unuttum", as well as the songs "Gazete" and "Allahından Bul".

In December 2004, her third album Banane (I Don't Care) was released by Seyhan Müzik. The songs on this album were written by Serdar Ortaç and Yıldız Tilbe. The album sold 40,000 copies and eight music videos were made for the songs "Bittim", "Aşkın Açamadığı Kapı", "Banane", "Vuracak", "Bir Anda Sevmiştim", "Tamamdır", "Pembe Dizi" and "Adam Gibi", the second of which was chosen as the Song of the Year at the 12th Turkey Music Awards. Critics drew similarities between "Banane"'s music vido and Madonna's short film "Star" made in 2002 for BMW. Akalın's future husband, Oğuz Kayhan, appeared in the music video for "Pembe Dizi".

=== 2006–09: Kusursuz 19 and Dans Et ===
Akalın wrote a few songs for her fourth studio album Kusursuz 19 (The Perfect 19) which was produced by Seyhan Müzik and released in June 2006. The album was released with high hopes to make Akalın a solid figure of Turkish pop music as, in Akalın's words, "Hande Yener was a bit distressed because her new tape was very European, and Gülşen was having problems due to her troubled relationship with her producer. As they are dealing with their problems and losing blood, I will take my place in the music market with my new album." The album sold 147,000 copies, got a gold certification from Mü-Yap and its lead single "Afedersin" became a number-one hit on Türkçe Top 20. Separate music videos were also made for the songs "Herkes Hakettiği Gibi Yaşıyor", "Mantık Evliliği" and "Alçak". Akalın received the award for Best Female Artist at the 13th Turkey Music Awards and "Afedersin" was chosen as the Best Song of the Year. In July 2006, she married restaurant owner Oğuz Kayhan and the couple got divorced in November. Akalın later stated that they were divorced because they had fallen in disagreement about having children.

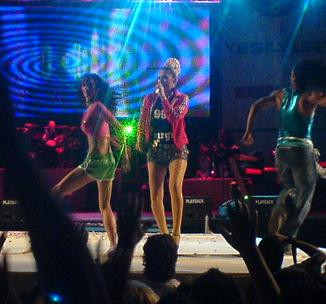
Akalın performing in Samsun in 2008

Akalın did not intend to release any new works for a period of time, but at the request of her fans, she eventually released the single "Tatil" in June. Meanwhile, she got into a feud with Hande Yener. Yener had said: "I do western music, so I can not compete with those who make fantasy music. What Demet does is not similar to my style." to which Akalın responded by saying: "If she does not like me, why is she after my works? It is obvious that she takes all the works that I don't like or refuse to do for herself." Yener subsequently took a case to the court asking for ₺50,000 on the grounds that Akalın had insulted her and attacked her verbally, but the court said that they did not find any insult in Akalın's words. The feud continued when Yener said: "Demet? She's a grocery singer. What she does is 'grocery music'. No doubt. The likes of her are the followers of Serdar Ortaç." Akalın responded by saying: "Oh, she does electronic music? It's more likely that she's been electrocuted." and won ₺10,000 in the court in a case against Yener. Hürriyet chose the phrase 'grocery music' as one of the core words of 2007 and Sırma Karasu from Habertürk described the grocery music debate as one of the breaking points of Turkish pop music. After this point, the feud between the two continued on numerous occasions.

Akalın's fifth studio album Dans Et (Dance) was produced by Seyhan Müzik and released in March 2008 with Ersay Üner writing and composing most of the songs. By the end of the year it sold 128,000 copies in Turkey and received a gold certification from Mü-Yap. Critics reacted negatively to slow-paced songs but praised the dance songs. The lead single "Mucize" ranked number one on Billboard Türkiye's Türkçe Top 20 for seven weeks. After making a music video for "Mucize", separate music videos were released for the songs "Bebek", "Gururum" and "Dans Et". "Bebek" became the third most-played song on radio in Turkey in 2008. At a concert in Bodrum in May 2008 Akalın said to a group of audience: "Bro, are you all from Diyarbakır? From the mountain side? I didn't understand where you came from. You're just looking like morons. One gives a round of applause or something." These words made her subject to a large number of reactions. She responded by saying: "The words I have said were a joke at my own friends from Diyarbakır who had come to see my performance. If the joke I made with all my sincerity towards my friends has been misunderstood, I apologize to all my fans from Diyarbakır." The criticism continued and seven businessmen from Diyarbakır accused Akalın of "publicly denouncing a section of society based on social class, sex, and regional difference". In 2010, the court decided to postpone the announcement of the judgment and, as a precautionary measure, the singer was ordered to write the words of the İstiklal Marşı on a page and make a five-page comment on the anthem.

In April 2009, Akalın released the single "Toz Pembe", which ranked number one on Türkçe Top 20. While the song was favorably received by some critics, it was considered by some as a replay of the singer's previous works.

=== 2010–14: Zirve, Giderli 16 and Rekor ===
In January 2010, Akalın married the businessman Önder Bekensir, but just like her first marriage this one also ended after a few months. In July, the couple applied to the court on the grounds of severe disagreement and they divorced over the course of 20 minutes. In April, she released her sixth studio album Zirve (Peak), which sold 83,000 copies and made her the eighth best-selling artist in Turkey in 2010. She later jokingly said that this album was full of "grocery songs to the bottom". Critics noted that the album contained "flat pop music rant" and was mostly commercial. The albums's lead single, "Tecrübe", ranked number two on Turkey's music charts. The first music video for the song was directed by Teoman Topçu, who spent ₺40,000 for its preparation, but as some drew similarities between the clip and Corenell's music video for "Keep on Jumpin'", Akalın set the video aside and worked with Tamer Aydoğdu on a second video clip for the song. Five other music videos were made for the songs "Evli, Mutlu, Çocuklu", "Çanta", "Bozuyorum Yeminimi", "Umutsuz Vaka" and "Olacak Olacak". Akalın's former husband appeared in the music video for "Evli, Mutlu, Çocuklu" and Tan Taşçı appeared in the music video for "Çanta", which was directed by Akalın herself. "Çanta" and "Olacak Olacak" ranked third and fourth on Turkey's official music charts. On 3 August 2010, Akalın performed for the first time at the Cemil Topuzlu Open-Air Theatre, and Murat Dalkılıç made an appearance on the stage as well.

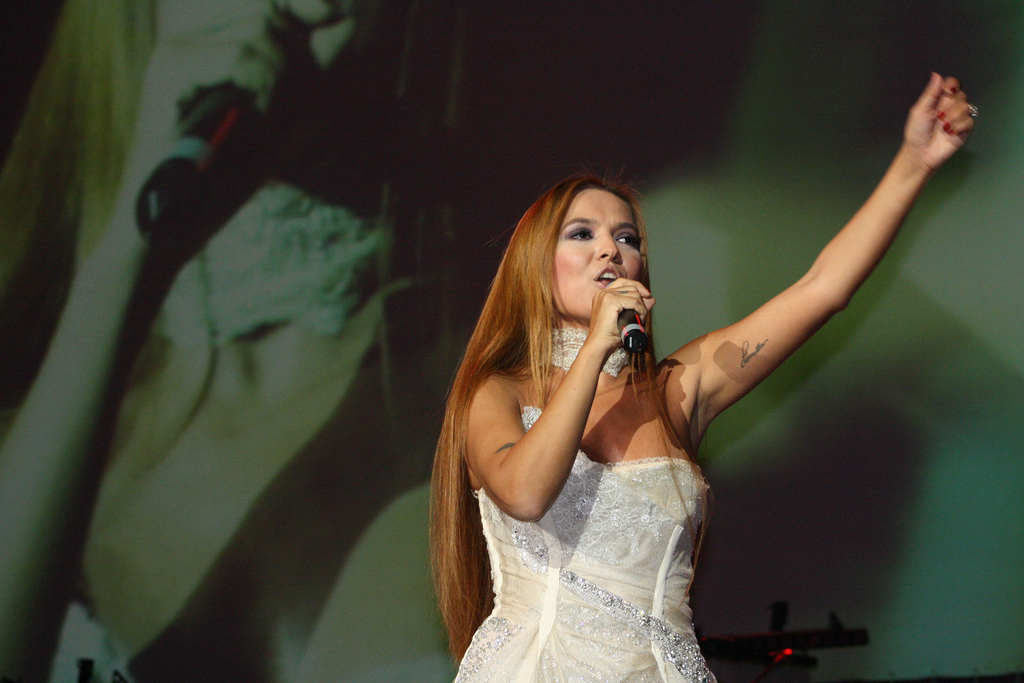
Akalın performing at a concert in 2011

In May 2011 Akalın began preparations for her new studio album and in summer she released her second EP Aşk, followed by the newly recorded song "Ben de Özledim" together with Ferdi Tayfur. Three months before that she had collaborated with Fettah Can on the song "Yanan Ateşi Söndürdük". Her EP sold 40,000 copies and one of its songs, "Sabıka", ranked among the top five on Turkey's music charts. In July, she performed at the 52nd International Nasrettin Teachers Memorial and Humor Days in Akşehir, Konya, and said to the district governor Ahmet Katırcı: "You covered your ears with your hands for an hour. Are you disturbed, 'uncle'? You're making me lose my concentration." These words resulted in a backlash from the district governor. Katırcı said that he had covered his ears as he was suffering from vertigo and accused Akalın of being disrespectful saying: "A professional artist, who has been on stage for many years, should know that she should not address a person who has come to see her performance as 'uncle'." Next month, Akalın's house in Beykoz was robbed and ₺100,000 cash and some jewelry were stolen. Akalın later sued the robbers for ₺600,000, five of whom were sent to prison. In October, she got a role as a supporting actress on TNT's TV series Yıldız Masalı and the next month her duet with Alişan, "Melekler İmza Topluyor", was released.

In March 2012, she played in a commercial for Morhipo together with Hande Yener. As to why they accepted the advertising offer, Akalın said: "They paid us a lot, we could not say no!" In the same month, she was featured on Erdem Kınay's album Proje, performing the songs "Rota" and "Emanet". The next month she married her third husband Okan Kurt. In May, her concert in Nicosia was cut short because of a protest during which plastic bottles were thrown at the stage, and the reason for this action was stated to be due to the comments she had made in Diyarbakır back in 2008. After a while Akalın posted a message on Twitter and said: "Killers of an unborn baby! All my curses be upon those who bothered me." hinting that she had had a miscarriage due to the criticism that she had faced in the press. Her seventh studio album Giderli 16 (Break Up 16) was released in November 2012 and sold 69,000 copies in Turkey, becoming the ninth best-selling album of the year. The critics stated that Akalın had continued to repeat the style of her previous works in this album and that she was making commercial-like music to sell out the album. Ersay Üner was featured on the lead single "Yılan". The song "Türkan", which was written as a tribute to Türkan Şoray, was chosen as the Best Song at the Turkey Music Awards and the 40th Golden Butterfly Awards. After these two songs, new music videos for "Giderli Şarkılar", "Yıkıl Karşımdan" (feat. Gökhan Özen), "Kalbindeki İmza", "Sepet", "Nasip Değilmiş" (duet with Özcan Deniz) and "Felaket" were released.

From March to June 2013, Akalın served as a judge on Popstar 2013 for 13 episodes together with Bülent Ersoy, Orhan Gencebay and Serdar Ortaç. After learning that she was pregnant, she canceled ten concerts in Europe at the end of the year from which she was supposed to earn ₺410,000. In February 2014, Akalın gave birth to her first child, a daughter named Hira, in Istanbul, and two months later her eighth studio album Rekor (Record) was released by Seyhan Müzik. The album sold 89,000 copies, becoming the number-one best-selling album in Turkey. Akalın recorded different music videos for the songs "İlahi Adalet", "Rekor", "Koltuk", "Nefsi Müdafaa" and "Yeminim Var". Out of these songs, the first one ranked second on Turkey's official music chart, and singer Gökhan Özen was the featuring artist on the fourth one. Music critic Yavuz Hakan Tok wrote that Akalın, who claimed that she did not have any concerns over the success of this album, was in fact trying to maintain her current popularity with the release of Rekor. Tok found this album's potential of becoming a hit low compared to Akalın's previous albums. In October, she was the guest judge at Show TV's Bu Tarz Benim. In the same month, she stopped working with Seyhan Müzik, the production company with which she had worked since 2004.

=== 2015–present: Pırlanta, Rakipsiz and Ateş ===
In December 2014, Akalın signed a ₺750,000 contract with DMC to produce a new album. In the early months of 2015 she started working on her ninth studio album; meanwhile she was featured on Emrah Karaduman's song "İntikam" and Sinan Akçıl's song "Vazgeçilmezim". In June, her new album Pırlanta (Diamond) was released, and its lead single "Ders Olsun" ranked second on Turkey's official music chart. The album itself became the best-selling album in Turkey, and sold 105,000 copies, receiving a gold certification from DMC. Following "Ders Olsun", new music videos were released for the songs "Gölge", "Çalkala", "Beş Yıl", "Pırlanta" and "Şerefime Namusuma". In the same year in August, Akalın took part in the first season of TV8's singing competition Rising Star Türkiye as a judge alongside Gülben Ergen, Fuat Güner and Mustafa Sandal.

In February 2016, Akalın was cast in a supporting role together with her husband in Osman Pazarlama. In November, her tenth studio album Rakipsiz (Unrivaled) was released and its lead single, "Hayalet", became a number-one hit on the official music chart for two weeks. On 11 September 2018, Akalın and her husband Okan Kurt divorced due to "irreconcilable differences". Their daughter's custody was given to Akalın. Akalın's house was reportedly being under the threat of confiscation due to the debts of Martaş Logistics, a company run by her husband's family. The couple later reconciled in late November 2018, but are not legally married. By the end of the year, Akalın and fellow singer Hande Yener reconciled after an 11-year feud which made them the subject of many tabloid news.

Akalın's eleventh studio album, Ateş (Fire), was released by DMC on 18 April 2019. The album's first music video, "N'apıyorsan Yap", was released on 19 April 2019, four days prior to the album's release on digital platforms. It was followed by music videos for the songs "Ağlar O Deli", "Esiyor" and "Yekten". In December 2020, Akalın launched her own cosmetic collection under the name DA.

In February 2020, Akalın performed a duet with Deniz Seki, Işın Karaca and Cansu Kurtçu on the song “Ala”. In July 2020, her single “Nostalji” was released. Akalın and Alişan co-hosted the daytime program Demet and Alişan ile Sabah Sabah with Demet and Alişan, which started airing on Star TV in August. The program ended in May 2021. In November 2020, she released her single “Kahır”, the lyrics of which belong to Sıla and the music of which belongs to Murat Yeter, together with its video clip. Akalın released the single “Bi Daha Bi Daha” in 2021, and in 2022 she sang the song “Yalan” from Sinan Akçıl's project album Piyanist 2, and the video clip of the song was released in February 2022. In May, Akalın reprised the song “Bensiz Olsun” in Serdar Ortaç's project album Serdar Ortaç Şarkıları Vol. 1 and released the single “Çukur” in July. In September 2023, she released the single “Yolla Bana Yolla”. In late 2023 she announced that she started the preparation of her twelfth album. In October 2023, she co-hosted the program Demet and Jess'le Gel Konuşalım (Come Talk with Demet and Jess) with Jess Molho, which started airing on TV8.

== Philanthropy ==
Demet Akalın donated ₺50,000 and ₺10,000 to Mehmetçik Foundation in 2016 and 2017 respectively. In 2019, she donated proceeds from her concert at the Cemil Topuzlu Open-Air Theatre to the same charity. In December 2019, Akalın together with Hande Yener and producer Polat Yağcı had a meeting with Turkish President Recep Tayyip Erdoğan. Prevention of child abuse and violence against women were among the discussed topics during the meeting. The singer received the Social Sensitivity Award at the International Crystal Diamond Awards. In September 2022, she built a two-class literacy school in the Alucra district of Giresun in support of the village schools project of Beşiktaş's women's fan group 'Çarşı Kadın'; the school was named after her father Ali Akalın. Demet Akalın opened four of her houses in Istanbul for earthquake victims for one year in support of the Evim Yuvan Olsun campaign initiated by AFAD after the Kahramanmaraş earthquakes on February 6, 2023, which caused major destruction in ten provinces. Later, Akalın announced that she undertook all the education expenses of Osman, a 14-year-old earthquake victim who was rescued wounded after 260 hours of the earthquake in Hatay.

== Discography ==
- Sebebim (1996)
- Unuttum (2003)
- Banane (2004)
- Kusursuz 19 (2006)
- Dans Et (2008)
- Zirve (2010)
- Giderli 16 (2012)
- Rekor (2014)
- Pırlanta (2015)
- Rakipsiz (2016)
- Ateş (2019)

== Filmography ==
Films

- Günlerden Pazar (1992)
- Sensiz Olmaz (1994)
- Tele Anahtar (1994)
- Osman Pazarlama (2016)

TV series

- Sibel (1998)
- En İyi Arkadaşım (2006)

== Television programs ==
As judge

- Popstar 2013 (2013)
- Bu Tarz Benim (2014) (guest judge)
- Rising Star Türkiye (2015)

As presenter

- Daha Ne Olsun (2007) (presented together with Alişan)
- Evlilik Hayatı (2010) (presented together with Önder Bekensir)
- Demet ve Alişan ile Sabah Sabah (2020–2021) (presented together with Alişan)
- Gelinim Mutfakta (2021)
- Demet ve Jess'le Gel Konuşalım (2023–2024) (presented together with Jess Molho)

== Commercials ==
Company/Product	Year	Director	Descriptions
Turkcell	2009		Akalın promoted Turkcell's new service for the youth called "GNÇ" and dined at McDonald's.
Morhipo	2012	Ozan Açıktan	Demet Akalın, along with Hande Yener, played in four of morhipo.com's commercials.
Çetmen	2017		Akalın appeared in the commercial for Çetmen and sang a modified version of her song "Koltuk" with new lyrics.
