= Rekor =

Studio album by Demet Akalın
- Released: 23 April 2014
- Genre: Pop
- Length: 1:09:20
- Label: Seyhan Müzik
- Producer: Bülent Seyhan

Demet Akalın chronology
Giderli 16 (2012)	Rekor (2014)	Pırlanta (2015)

Rekor (Record) is the eighth studio album by Turkish singer Demet Akalın. It was released on 23 April 2014 by Seyhan Müzik.

== Background and promotion ==
For this album, Akalın worked with a number of different artists, including Burak Yeter, Cansu Kurtcu, Ceyhun Çelikten, Erdem Kınay, Erem Yıldız, Erhan Bayrak, Emrah Karaduman, Ersay Üner, Lerzan Mutlu, Fettah Can, Gökhan Özen, Gökhan Şahin, Hakkı Yalçın and İdo Tatlıses. To promote the album, Akalın gave various concerts across Turkey, including a concert at the Bostancı Show Center in May 2014, for which she spent ₺70,000 on decoration and was accompanied by 30 dancers.

The album's cover was designed by Müjdat Kupsi and Özlem Semiz. Later it was revealed that Akalın's head had been photoshopped into a photo of model Carla Crombie from 2013.

== Achievements and critical reception ==
The album sold 89,000 copies, becoming the number-one best-selling album in Turkey. Akalın recorded different music videos for the songs "İlahi Adalet", "Rekor", "Koltuk", "Nefsi Müdafaa" and "Yeminim Var". Out of these songs, the first one ranked second on Turkey's official music chart, and singer Gökhan Özen was the featuring artist on the fourth one. Music critic Yavuz Hakan Tok wrote that Akalın, who claimed that she did not have any concerns over the success of this album, was in fact trying to maintain her current popularity with the release of Rekor. Tok found this album's potential of becoming a hit low compared to Akalın's previous albums.

== Track listing ==
No.	Title	Lyrics	Music	Arrangement	Length
1.	"Kötü Kalp"	Ersay Üner	Ersay Üner	Erdem Kınay	3:58
2.	"Nefsi Müdafaa"	Gökhan Özen	Gökhan Özen	Gökhan Özen	3:59
3.	"İlahi Adalet"	Gökhan Özen	Gökhan Özen	Erdem Kınay	4:11
4.	"Rekor"	Gökhan Şahin	Emrah Karaduman	Emrah Karaduman	3:49
5.	"Ummadığım Anda"	Yıldız Tilbe	Yıldız Tilbe	Erhan Bayrak	5:04
6.	"Ara Verelim"	Ersay Üner	Ersay Üner	Burak Yeter	4:07
7.	"Vay Vay Vay"	Hakkı Yalçın	Ceyhun Çelikten	Ceyhun Çelikten	4:26
8.	"Kibrit"	Lerzan Mutlu	Lerzan Mutlu	Miraç Kutlu	4:01
9.	"Koltuk"	Cansu Kurtçu	Cansu Kurtçu, Fettah Can	Erhan Bayrak	4:04
10.	"Ödeştik"	Cansu Kurtçu	Fettah Can	Erhan Bayrak	5:23
11.	"Sözüm Ona Sevdin"	Ersay Üner	Ersay Üner	Erhan Bayrak	4:11
12.	"Gurur Duyarım"	Cansu Kurtçu	Cansu Kurtçu, Fettah Can	Erhan Bayrak	4:32
13.	"Yeminim Var"	Gökhan Özen	Gökhan Özen	Gökhan Özen	4:15
14.	"Aşk Totemi"	Erem Yıldız	Erem Yıldız	David Şaboy	3:37
15.	"Vur Gitsin Beni"	Tahir Paker	Burhan Bayar	Emrah Moğolkoç	4:38
16.	"Vur Gitsin Beni (İdo Version)"	Tahir Paker	Burhan Bayar	İdo Tatlıses	4:27
Total length:					1:09:20

== Personnel ==
- Supervisor: Demet Akalın
- Producer: Bülent Seyhan, Fuat Seyhan
- Mastering: Çağlar Türkmen
- Photographs: Müjdat Küpşi
- Styling: Bener Hamamcı
- Graphic Design: Müjdat Küpşi, Özlem Semiz
- Printing: FRS
- Studios: Erdem Kınay, Han Medya (Sarı Ev), Kaya Müzik, ByRAK Records, Makara Band, Studyo Emrec

== Sales ==
Country	Sales
Turkey (MÜ-YAP)	89,971
