= Pırlanta =

Studio album by Demet Akalın
- Released: 19 June 2015
- Recorded: January 2015
- Genre: Pop
- Length: 53:13
- Label: Doğan Music Company
- Producer: Samsun Demir

Demet Akalın chronology
Rekor (2014)	Pırlanta (2015)	Rakipsiz (2016)

Pırlanta (Diamond) is the ninth studio album by Turkish singer Demet Akalın. It was released on 19 June 2015 by Doğan Music Company. It was Demet Akalın's first album to be released by this production company. Its lead single Ders Olsun ranked second on Turkey's official music chart, and the album itself became the best-selling album in Turkey in 2015.

== Music videos ==
The album's lead single "Ders Olsun" was written and composed by Sinan Akçıl and arranged by Volga Tamöz. Its music video was directed by Müjdat Küpşi. The second music video was prepared for the song "Gölge" under Müjdat Küpşi's direction and was shot in Bodrum over the course of three days. In the music video for "Çalkala", which was also directed by Müjdat Kupşi, Akalın was accompanied by 8 dancers. The music video was first shown to the public on 17 October 2015 during Akalın's concert at the Bostancı Show Center. The fourth music video was produced for the song "Beş Yıl", written and composed by Berkay and arranged by Çağrı Telkıvıran. It was directed by Sedat Doğan and shot over the course of two days in Garipçe, Istanbul. It was followed by "Pırlanta", whose music video was directed by Tamer Aydoğdu. The album's sixth music video was prepared and released for the song "Şerefime Namusuma". The song was written and composed by Soner Sarıkabadayı and arranged by Erdem Kınay. In the music video, which was directed by Tamer Aydoğdu, Akalın appeared together with her husband Okan Kurt. Demet Akalın later announced on her Twitter account that the last music video from Pırlanta would be made for the song "Özüme Döndüm", but the plan was later cancelled.

== Track listing ==
No.	Title	Lyrics	Music	Arrangement	Length
1.	"Ders Olsun"	Sinan Akçıl	Sinan Akçıl	Volga Tamöz	3:23
2.	"Gölge"	Elif Nun İçelli	Elif Nun İçelli	Erdem Kınay	3:49
3.	"Şerefime Namusuma"	Soner Sarıkabadayı	Soner Sarıkabadayı	Erdem Kınay	3:37
4.	"Özüme Döndüm"	Gökhan Özen	Gökhan Özen	Erdem Kınay	3:39
5.	"Beş Yıl"	Berkay	Berkay	Çağrı Telkıvıran	4:53
6.	"Bekleyemedin Mi"	Sezen Aksu	Sezen Aksu	Mustafa Ceceli	4:12
7.	"Seven Sever"	Cansu Kurtçu	Cansu Kurtçu, Fettah Can	Fettah Can	3:04
8.	"Ya Sana Bir Şey Olursa"	Ayla Çelik	Ayla Çelik, Nezih Üçler	Erhan Bayrak	4:24
9.	"Gidenlerin Kalanları"	Ayla Çelik	Ayla Çelik, Bertan Aslanlı	Erhan Bayrak	4:01
10.	"Günaydın Abla"	Özhan Jan	Özhan Jan	Erdem Kınay	3:34
11.	"Matmazel"	Aslızen	Aslızen	Burak Berberoğlu	3:10
12.	"Pırlanta"	Gökhan Şahin	İrfan Özata	Enver Günen	3:48
13.	"Çalkala"	Aslızen, Elif Nun İçelli	Aslızen, Burak Yeter	Burak Yeter	3:13
14.	"Ders Olsun (DJ Ufuk Akyıldız Remix)"	Sinan Akçıl	Sinan Akçıl	Ufuk Akyıldız	4:01
Total length:					53:13

== Personnel ==
- Supervisor: Demet Akalın
- Producer: Samsun Demir
- Photographs: Sedat Doğan
- Hair: Nuri Şekerci
- Make-up: Mutlu Genç
- Graphic design: Ebru Aydemir | DS
- Printing: GD Ofset

== Sales ==
Country	Certification	Sales
Turkey (MÜ-YAP)	Gold (Note: The certification was not given by Turkey's official music producers association MÜ-YAP, but by the album's production company DMC. DMC only awards its own artists, while MÜ-YAP awards the best-selling artists in general.)	105,000
