= Zirve =

Studio album by Demet Akalın
- Released: 23 April 2010
- Genre: Pop
- Length: 1:10:28
- Label: Seyhan Müzik
- Producer: Bülent Seyhan

Demet Akalın chronology
Dans Et (2008)	Zirve (2010)	Aşk (2011)

Singles from Zirve
- 1. "Tecrübe" Released: 19 April 2010; 2. "Evli, Mutlu, Çocuklu" Released: 27 May 2010; 3. "Çanta" Released: 12 July 2010; 4. "Bozuyorum Yeminimi" Released: 23 September 2010; 5. "Umutsuz Vaka" Released: 3 January 2011; 6. "Olacak Olacak" Released: 7 February 2011

Zirve (Peak) is the sixth studio album by Turkish singer Demet Akalın. It was released by Seyhan Müzik on 23 April 2010 The release date was officially announced as 23 April 2010, but postponed because of air travel restrictions during the volcanic eruptions of Iceland. The follow-up of Dans Et, this was her first album in more than two years. Akalın again worked with Bülent Seyhan, with whom she had worked the album Banane (1996). The album has been split into two parts: the first ten songs are "Dance Hits", and the remaining six songs are "Slow Hits".

The songs were written by Ersay Üner, Emrah Karaduman, Gökhan Şahin, Ceyhun Çelikten, Yıldız Tilbe, Tan Taşçı, and Erdem Kınay, and the arrangements were done by Erhan Bayrak, David Şaboy and Ozan Yılmaz. Together with Ziynet Sali, Akalın recorded the song "Bozuyorum Yeminimi", written by Yıldız Tilbe and composed by Bülent Özdemir, which was previously performed in the 1990s by Hazal. Another Yıldız Tilbe song, "Dayan Yüreğim", also appeared on the album with new arrangements. The album sold 100,000 copies by the end of 2010, becoming one of the best-selling albums of the year, and ranked eighth on MÜ-YAP's list of successful albums.

== Singles ==
The first single from the album was "Tecrübe", which began to be broadcast on radios on 19 April 2010. The song's initial music video was directed by Teoman Topçu, showing a football match between boys and girls. The video cost Akalın 40,000 and it was later revealed that it had been inspired by Corenell's video 'Keep On Jumping'. After realizing this, Akalın refused to publish the video, and started working with Tamer Aydoğdu on another music video for the song. The video was first shown on 1 May 2010 on Kral TV. Tecrübe later became a hit and ranked number one on the music charts in Turkey. On 8 May 2010, it entered Kral TV Top 20 list as the number 10th song, rising to number 6 after two weeks, and eventually number one on the third week after its release on 22 May. On 29 May, it again appeared on the list as the number 5 song.

The album's second music video, "Evli, Mutlu, Çocuklu", was released on 27 May. Akalın's former husband Önder Bekensir also appeared on the video. It was recorded in Kilyos, and 20 kids appeared alongside Akalın on the video. It was directed by Eyüp Dirlik over the course of two days. Akalın used 5 different outfits for the video. Akalın to make the kids feel comfortable during the shooting, about which she said: "We had so much fun together for two days. We took great images. They will be very happy when they watch it. For me and for them, it was a wonderful experience."

"Olacak Olacak" became a hit before the release of any music videos in December 2010 it became one of the most streamed songs on radios. The album's sixth music video was made for "Olacak Olacak" in February 2011 despite the cold weather. It was recorded at Bursa Karinna Hotel in Uludağ. Demet Akalın, ""Olacak Olacak" is already a hit ... I didn't want to limit the song's music video in the studios of Istanbul. It should have been more effective and different. So we recorded it in Uludağ." To record the shots in HD format, the video was taken by Canon Eos 5d Mark 2 and iPhone 4 mobile phone. It was directed by Şahin Yiğit and Müjdat Kupsi. The video was first published on 7 February 2011 on Kral TV's official website and then shown on Kral TV on 8 February 2011.

After releasing the 6th music video, Akalın mentioned that all of the songs in Zirve had become and stated "'There are no vain songs in any of my albums".

== Promotion ==
The album was accompanied by a string of concerts given in Germany, the Netherlands, and Turkey.

== Track listing ==
=== Dance Hits ===
No.	Title	Lyrics	Music	Length
1.	"Bu Benim Partim"	Ersay Üner	Ersay Üner	3:38
2.	"Tecrübe"	Ersay Üner	Ersay Üner	4:38
3.	"Pasta"	Ersay Üner	Ersay Üner	5:06
4.	"Zirve"	Gökhan Şahin	Ceyhun Çelikten	4:26
5.	"Dayan Yüreğim"	Yıldız Tilbe	Yıldız Tilbe	4:27
6.	"Çanta"	Tan Taşçı	Tan Taşçı	3:55
7.	"Evli, Mutlu, Çocuklu"	Gökhan Şahin	Ceyhun Çelikten	4:44
8.	"Olacak Olacak"	Gökhan Şahin	Erdem Kınay	4:15
9.	"Zirve Version – Mert Ali İçelli"	Gökhan Şahin	Ceyhun Çelikten	4:35
10.	"Umutsuz Vaka Version – Erhan Bayrak"	Ersay Üner	Ersay Üner	5:17

=== Slow Hits ===
No.	Title	Lyrics	Music	Length
1.	"Dur"	Ersay Üner	Ersay Üner	4:40
2.	"Boşuna"	Emrah Karaduman	Emrah Karaduman	3:39
3.	"Bozuyorum Yeminimi"	Yıldız Tilbe	Bülent Özdemir	4:55
4.	"Umutsuz Vaka"	Ersay Üner	Ersay Üner	4:09
5.	"Tam 7 Yıl Oldu"	Emirkan	Emirkan	4:28
6.	"Allah'ın Emri"	Ersay Üner	Ersay Üner	3:32

=== Bonus Track ===
No.	Title	Lyrics	Music	Length
1.	"Umutsuz Vaka (Feat. Fatman Scoop)"	Ersay Üner	Ersay Üner	4:24

== Achievements ==
On Kral TV's list of "2010 Top 50", which was published on 31 December 2010, "Evli, Mutlu, Çocuklu", ranked 3rd, "Tecrübe" ranked 14th, "Çanta" ranked 25th and "Bozuyorum Yeminimi" ranked 39th. On Kral FM's list "2010 Top 50", which was published in late 2010, the only Demet Akalın song that appeared on the list was "Çanta", ranking 20th.

Zirve also received the Best Album award by a female artist at the 14th İstanbul FM Golden Awards.

== Charts ==
Song	Peak position
Song	Turkey
"Tecrübe"	1
"Evli, Mutlu, Çocuklu"	8
"Çanta"	3
"Bozuyorum Yeminimi"	19
"Umutsuz Vaka"	39
"Olacak Olacak"	2
