= Ateş (album) =

Studio album by Demet Akalın
- Released: 18 April 2019
- Recorded: 2018–2019
- Genre: Pop
- Length: 53:19
- Label: DMC
- Producer: Samsun Demir

Demet Akalın chronology
Rakipsiz (2016)	Ateş (2019)	D-POP (2024)

Ateş (Fire) is the eleventh studio album by Turkish singer Demet Akalın. It was released on 18 April 2019 by Doğan Music Company. The album was among Turkey's best-selling albums of 2019 and received a gold certification from DMC.

== Background and design ==
Demet Akalın first announced her plans for releasing a new album during her concert at the Bostancı Show Center on 27 October 2018. Akalın's photographs for the album were taken by Erman İştahlı and its cover was designed by Ahmet Terzioğlu.

== Promotion ==
To promote Ateş, Akalın organized a number of concerts in various cities across Turkey in summer 2019.

=== Music videos ===
Four of the songs in this album were turned into music videos. The lead single, "N'apıyorsan Yap", was released on 19 April 2019 together with a music video. The second music video was released for the song "Ağlar O Deli". It was directed by Nihat Odabaşı. Tamer Aydoğdu directed the music video for the album's third music video "Esiyor". Another music video, also directed by Aydoğdu, was released for the song "Yekten", which featured vocals by Haktan.

== Critical reception ==
Mayk Şişman from Milliyet believed that "with her new songs, Demet Akalın has thrown us a curve", which he found pleasing and added: "For someone like Demet Akalın, who does not want to take risks, likes to go along the path created by her previous hit songs, and has her name associated with 'guaranteed' criticism, it's actually important to try a new 'sound'." Furkan Can Hazar from the same newspaper described Akalın as "a female vocal who directs the music market" and added that in this album he saw "Demet Akalın as a dynamic and lively artist who is open to innovation." Yavuz Hakan Tok, who wrote a review of the album on his personal website, found it not bad and wrote: "Won't it be listened to? Won't it be loved? It'll be listened to again, it'll be loved again, but as I said, the atmosphere of that time was different, now it's another era. Catching the atmosphere of every period is not an easy task. Not easy for Demet. Because from the beginning, Demet Akalın squeezed herself somewhere between pop and arabesque songs." Writing for Sabah, Özlem Avcı described Akalın as key "manufacturer in music industry" and praised her ability in "choosing songs suitable for her voice."

== Track listing ==
No.	Title	Lyrics	Music	Length
1.	"N'apıyorsan Yap"	Tan Taşçı	Tan Taşçı	2:53
2.	"Geberesice"	Derya Bedavacı	Derya Bedavacı	3:15
3.	"Esiyor"	Ayla Çelik · Şebnem Sungur · Gökhan Tepe · Serdar Aslan	Ayla Çelik · Gökhan Tepe	3:31
4.	"Ağlar O Deli"	Hakkı Yalçın	Ayla Çelik · Serdar Aslan	3:45
5.	"Bizi Buluyor"	Sıla	Sıla · Efe Bahadır	3:44
6.	"Yekten" (feat. Haktan)	Öze Bade Derinöz	Öze Bade Derinöz	3:24
7.	"Kader"	Şebnem Sungur	Ayla Çelik · Serdar Aslan	3:47
8.	"Marlin"	Ayla Çelik	Ayla Çelik	3:51
9.	"Ateş"	Hakkı Yalçın	Ayla Çelik · Serdar Aslan	3:39
10.	"Söz"	Hakkı Yalçın	Ayla Çelik · Serdar Aslan	3:50
11.	"Alâ"	Cansu Kurtçu	Cansu Kurtçu	3:08
12.	"2'den Sonra"	Cansu Kurtçu	Cansu Kurtçu	3:33
13.	"Minik"	Murat Güneş	Murat Güneş	3:23
14.	"Ödül"	Şebnem Sungur · Ayla Çelik	Ayla Çelik · Serdar Aslan	3:28
15.	"Bir Demet"	Emirkan Yıldız · Ebru Polat	Emirkan Yıldız	4:07
Total length:				53:19

== Charts ==
Chart (2019)	Peak position
Turkey (D&R Best-Selling)	1

== Sales ==
Country	Certification	Sales
Turkey (DMC)	Gold (Note: The certification was not given by Turkey's official music producers association MÜ-YAP, but by the album's production company DMC. DMC only awards its own artists, while MÜ-YAP awards the best-selling artists in general.)	50,000

== Release history ==
Country	Date	Format(s)	Label	Ref.
Turkey	18 April 2019	CD	Doğan Music Company	
Turkey	23 April 2019	Digital download	Doğan Music Company	
Worldwide	23 April 2019	Digital download	Doğan Music Company	
