= Banane =

Studio album by Demet Akalın
- Released: 12 September 2004
- Genre: Pop
- Length: 59:34
- Label: Seyhan
- Director: Suat Aydoğan
- Producer: Bülent Seyhan

Demet Akalın chronology
Unuttum (2003)	Banane (2004)	Kusursuz 19 (2006)

Banane (I Don't Care) is the third studio album by Turkish singer Demet Akalın. It was released on 12 December 2004. Suat Aydoğan served as the album's music director. The songs were arranged by Ersay Üner, Erdem Kınay and Lütfü Bayülgen. The album sold 40,000 copies in 19 days. Eight music videos were made for the songs "Bittim", "Aşkın Açamadığı Kapı", "Banane", "Vuracak", "Bir Anda Sevmiştim", "Tamamdır", "Pembe Dizi" and "Adam Gibi", the second of which was chosen as the Song of the Year at the 12th Turkey Music Awards. Critics drew similarities between "Banane"'s music vido and Madonna's short film "Star" made in 2002 for BMW.

== Track listing ==
No.	Title	Lyrics	Music	Length
1.	"Banane"	Burak Öksüzoğlu	Burak Öksüzoğlu	4:33
2.	"Bana Döneceksin"	Yıldız Tilbe	Yıldız Tilbe	3:38
3.	"Bittim"	Serdar Ortaç	Serdar Ortaç	4:56
4.	"Bilmek İstiyorum"	Ersay Üner	Ersay Üner	5:43
5.	"Pembe Dizi"	Ersay Üner	Ersay Üner	4:08
6.	"Vuracak"	Yıldız Tilbe	Yıldız Tilbe	3:46
7.	"Yalnızım"	Mehmet Tahir Peker	Burhan Bayar	6:09
8.	"Taçsız Kral"	Burak Öksüzoğlu	Burak Öksüzoğlu	4:15
9.	"Ninni"	Sibel Alaş Aköz	Sibel Alaş Aköz	4:59
10.	"Aşkın Açamadığı Kapı"	Sude Bilge Demir	Sude Bilge Demir	4:21
11.	"Adam Gibi"	Ersay Üner	Ersay Üner	5:27
12.	"Bir Anda Sevmiştim"	Ersay Üner	Ersay Üner	4:14
13.	"Tamamdır"	Arzu Aslan	Arzu Aslan	3:11
14.	"Vuracak" (New Version)	Yıldız Tilbe	Yıldız Tilbe	4:48
Total length:				59:34

== Release history ==
Country	Date	Format	Label	Ref.
Turkey	12 December 2004	CD	Seyhan Müzik	
Turkey	16 December 2004	Digital download	Seyhan Müzik	
Worldwide	16 December 2004	Digital download	Seyhan Müzik	
