= Kusursuz 19 =

Studio album by Demet Akalın
- Released: 14 June 2006
- Recorded: 2005–2006
- Genre: Pop
- Length: 1:25:44
- Label: Seyhan Müzik
- Producer: Bülent Seyhan

Demet Akalın chronology
Banane (2004)	Kusursuz 19 (2006)	Dans Et (2008)

Kusursuz 19 (The Perfect 19) is the fourth studio album by Turkish singer Demet Akalın, released in June 2006. It was produced by Seyhan Müzik. Ersay Üner served as the album's music director, while Erhan Bayrak and Mustafa Ceceli both arranged the majority of the album's songs.

== Achievements ==
The album sold 147,000 copies, got a gold certification from Mü-Yap, and its lead single "Afedersin" became a number-one hit on Türkçe Top 20. Separate music videos were also made for the songs "Herkes Hakettiği Gibi Yaşıyor", "Mantık Evliliği" and "Alçak". Akalın received the award for Best Female Artist at the 13th Turkey Music Awards and "Afedersin" was chosen as the Best Song of the Year.

== Track listing ==
No.	Title	Lyrics	Music	Arrangement	Length
1.	"Afedersin"	Ersay Üner	Ersay Üner	Erhan Bayrak	3:55
2.	"Alçak"	Ersay Üner	Ersay Üner	Ersay Üner	5:00
3.	"Herkes Hak Ettiği Gibi Yaşıyor"	Ersay Üner	Ersay Üner	Erhan Bayrak	4:21
4.	"İhanet"	Aslızen	Aslızen	Mustafa Ceceli	5:09
5.	"Helal Olsun"	Ersay Üner	Ersay Üner	Ersay Üner	4:22
6.	"İyi Dinle"	Demet Akalın, Ersay Üner	Ersay Üner	Ersay Üner	5:06
7.	"Mantık Evliliği"	Soner Sarıkabadayı	Soner Sarıkabadayı	Erhan Bayrak	4:13
8.	"Esmer Yarim"	Emirkan	Emirkan	Mustafa Ceceli	5:59
9.	"Of"	Ersay Üner	Ersay Üner	Ersay Üner	4:03
10.	"Seven Kızın Romanı"	Hakkı Yalçın	Emirkan	Erhan Bayrak	4:56
11.	"Kader"	Aslızen	Aslızen	Mustafa Ceceli	4:37
12.	"Anlatamadın Mı?"	Ersay Üner	Ersay Üner	Erhan Bayrak	5:11
13.	"Sana Değer"	Yıldız Tilbe	Bülent Özdemir	Ersay Üner	4:42
14.	"Yanılmışım"	Ersay Üner	Ersay Üner	Ersay Üner	3:17
15.	"Oldu Mu?"	Ersay Üner	Ersay Üner	Ersay Üner	3:01
16.	"Solundan Mı Kalktın?"	Aslızen	Aslızen	Aslızen	3:07
17.	"Yanılmışım (Dance)"	Ersay Üner	Ersay Üner	Ersay Üner	4:48
18.	"Herkes Hakettiği Gibi Yaşıyor (Version)"	Ersay Üner	Ersay Üner	Ersay Üner	4:18
19.	"Of (Club Remix)"	Ersay Üner	Ersay Üner	Hüseyin Karadayı	5:37
Total length:					1:25:44

== Personnel ==
=== Music ===
Singer: Demet Akalın; Backing vocals: Ayla Çelik, Belma Şahin, Cihan Okan, Ersay Üner, Murat Aziret, Sibel Gürsoy, Yeşim Vatan; Guitar: Erdem Sökmen, Serkan Ölçer; Bass: Birkan Şener, Mert Ali İçeli, İsmail Soyberk; Fretless bass: Ayhan Günyıl, İsmail Soyberk	Oud, cümbüş, bağlama & bouzouki: Ali Yılmaz; Flute: Serdar Barçın; Saxophone: Selçuk Suna, Serdar Barçın; Trumpet: Hüsnü Şenlendirici, Mehmet Çelik

=== Production ===
- Executive producers: Bülent Seyhan, Ersay Üner, Demet Akalın,
- Production: Bülent Seyhan, Ersay Üner, Demet Akalın
- Mastering: Ulaş Ağce
- Audio engineering: Arzu Arısoy, Serdar Ağırlı, Serkan Kula, DJ Özhan Özal

=== Visuals ===
- Artwork, photographs: Emre Ünal
- Make-up: Audisho Audisho
- Design: Audisho Audisho

Credits adapted from Discogs.

== Charts ==
List of singles
Single	Year	Peak
Single	Year	TR
"Afedersin"	2006	1

== Sales ==
Country	Certification	Sales
Turkey (MÜ-YAP)	Gold	147,000
