= Ayla Çelik =

Turkish singer-songwriter

- Born: 14 November 1973 (age 52); Ardahan, Turkey
- Education: Istanbul Technical University
- Occupations: Singer; songwriter; composer
- Musical career
- Genres: Pop
- Years active: 2007–present
- Labels: Dokuz Sekiz; Sony
- Website: www.aylacelik.net

Ayla Çelik (born 14 November 1973) is a Turkish singer-songwriter.

== Life and career ==
Ayla Çelik was born on 14 November 1973 in Ardahan. She finished her studies at the Istanbul Technical University State Conservatory and then started her music career. She started her professional music career with Melih Kibar. For a long period, she sang commercial songs. She also made music for the state theaters, including the play Antigone, directed by Kenan Işık.

On 30 July 2007, she released a joint album İstanbul Türküleri with Belma Şahin. On 3 December 2008, she released her first single "Bir Dönebilsem". On 30 September 2010, her second studio album Lavanta was released. The album's lead single was also titled "Lavanta". In 2012, the song "Türkan" from Demet Akalın's album Giderli 16, which was written by Çelik, was chosen as the Best Song of the Year at Golden Butterfly Awards and Turkey Music Awards. In 2013, Çelik was featured on the album Aysel'in, in tribute to Aysel Gürel, and sang the song "Olacak Olacak". Çelik has written and composed songs for İbrahim Tatlıses, Sibel Can, Ebru Gündeş, Gülben Ergen, Serdar Ortaç, Demet Akalın, Gökhan Tepe, İrem Derici, Aşkın Nur Yengi, Özcan Deniz, Petek Dinçöz, Ebru Yaşar and Berkay.

On 15 January 2016, her second studio album Ben was released. For the album's lead single, the song "Aşk Şarkıları", composed by Erhan Bayrak, was chosen. The second music video was released for the song "Bağdat", which is a duet with Beyazıt Öztürk. The song became a number-one hit on Türkçe Top 20.

On 2 August 2019, Çelik's third studio album, titled Daha Bi' Aşık, was released by Sony Music. The album, which consists of 14 songs, was written and composed by Çelik, Hakkı Yalçın, Erkin Koray and Şebnem Sungur. Okay Barış, Alper Atakan, Orhan Sancak, Serkan Ölçer and Erhan Bayrak served as the album's arrangers. The lead single, "Daha Bi' Aşık", was released on the same day together with a music video.

== Discography ==
Albums

- İstanbul Türküleri (2007)
- Lavanta (2010)
- Ben (2016)
- Daha Bi' Aşık (2019)

Singles

- "Bir Dönebilsem" (2008)
- "Altın Sarısı" (Hakan Kabil Remix) (2016)
- "Dikensiz Gül" (from Eşkıya Dünyaya Hükümdar Olmaz soundtrack) (2017)
- "Aşk Tutar Beni" (from Yasak Elma soundtrack) (2018)
- "Daha Bi' Aşık" (Selami Bilgiç Version) (2019)
- "Parti (Şiki Şiki Baba)" (with Beyazıt Öztürk) (2020)
- "Ay Işığı" (2020)
- "Yalancılar" (2021)
- "Seviyoruz Hâlâ" (with Hakan Altun) (2021)
- "Öp Beni" (2022)
- "Nisan Yağmuru" (feat. Emel Şenocak) (from the album Emel Şenocak'tan Yıldızlı Pekiyi) (2023)
- "Sakla Beni" (2024)
- "Canımız Yansın" (2024)
- "Vur Vur" (from the album Hakkı Yalçın Şarkıları, Vol. 2) (2025)
- "Gecenin Köründe" (2025)

== Songs written by Çelik ==
- Aşkın Nur Yengi – "Elin Oğlu", "Hafta Sonu", "Bi' Sebepten"
- Berkay – "İzmirli"
- Demet Akalın – "Türkan", "Ya Sana Bir Şey Olursa", "Gidenlerin Kalanları"
- Ebru Gündeş – "Vatan", "Aşkın Huzurunda", "Gık"
- Ebru Yaşar – "Hasretin Vuruyor"
- Gökhan Tepe – "Kader"
- Gülben Ergen – "Bugünün Sevdalısı"
- İrem Derici – "Dantel"
- Kendi – "Voltaj"
- Petek Dinçöz – "Yerimde Sen Olsan", "Aşk Yüzünden", "Kolay Değil"
- Reyhan Karaca – "Şans"
- Serdar Ortaç – "Rahvan", "Abi"
- Sibel Can – "Benim Adım Aşk"
- Bengü – "Kuzum"
