= Özgün =

Turkish singer

- Born: Özgün Uğurlu; 19 October 1979 (age 46); Eskişehir, Turkey
- Genres: Pop
- Occupation: Singer
- Years active: 2005–present
- Labels: Seyhan; Avrupa; Poll
- Spouse: Nida Karaçar (m. 2012)

Özgün Uğurlu (born 19 October 1979) is a Turkish singer.

== Early life and education ==
At the age of 8, he joined the Eskişehir Anadolu University Children's Choir. At the age of 11, he moved to Ankara. At the age of 16 he started his career as a musician and worked in a number of cafes and bars. He graduated from Hacettepe University Ankara State Conservatory in 2001 with a degree in cello studies. He then worked under contract for the Presidential Symphony Orchestra.

== Career ==
His first studio album Elveda was released in November 2005. Several songs from this album were turned into music videos, including "Elveda", "Şeytan", "Yanarım", "Kandırman Lazım", "Günahkar" and "Aşk Çiçeği". Özgün's second album, titled Nöbetçi Aşık was released on 20 June 2007. The album's lead single, "Kıvırır", was released with a music video on 23 June 2007. He started his military service in December 2009 and completed it in May 2010.

After releasing a single, titled "Yeni", under the label Avrupa Müzik, his 2010 song "İstiklal" became a hit and entered national charts. 2010 Another single, titled "Toz", was released in fall 2010. His 2011 single "Sadece Arkadaşız" managed to be a major hit as well and ranked 2nd on Türkçe Top 20.

== Personal life ==
He married Nida Karaçar in July 2012. The couple has a son who has been diagnosed with down syndrome.

== Discography ==
=== Albums ===
- Elveda (2005)
- Nöbetçi Aşık (2007)
- Biz Ayrıldık (2009)
- Yeni (EP) (2010)
- Konu Senden Açılınca (2012)

=== Singles ===
- "Milli Takım Marşı" (2010)
- "Sen ve Ben" (2011)
- "Tatil" (2013)
- "Öpücem" (2014)
- "Şimdi Burada Olsan" (2015)
- "Bu Kadar Mı Zor" (2016)
- "Senden İbaret" (2016)
- "Bayramın Kutlu Olsun / Birlikte Çok Güzeliz" (2016)
- "Gelmiyor musun?" (2017)
- "Hayalet" (2018)
- "Aşık" (2019)
- "Kalbimin Her Yeri" (2019)
- "Mahzen" (2020)
- "En Güzeli (Acoustic)" (2021)
- "Vefa" (2021)
- "Mümkansız" (2021)

=== Charts ===
| Album | Single | Peak |
| Album | Single | TR |
|---|---|---|
| Elveda | "Günahkar" | 17 |
| Nöbetçi Aşık | "Kıvırır" | 5 |
| Nöbetçi Aşık | "Acıyı Çeken Anlar" | 2 |
| Nöbetçi Aşık | "Yalnızlık" | — |
| Nöbetçi Aşık | "Kıpır Kıpır" | — |
| Biz Ayrıldık | "Biz Ayrıldık" | 6 |
| Biz Ayrıldık | "Zilli" | 17 |
| Biz Ayrıldık | "Mühür" | 13 |
| Biz Ayrıldık | "Direniyorum Yokluğuna" | — |
| Yeni | "İstiklal" | 4 |
| Yeni | "Toz" | 4 |
| Sadece Arkadaşız | "Sadece Arkadaşız" | 2 |
| Mahzen | "Mahzen" | 1 |

== Awards ==
| Year | Award | Category |
|---|---|---|
| 2007 | 11th Istanbul Fm Golden Awards | Best Male Pop Singer |
| 2007 | 34th Golden Butterfly Awards | Best Music Video (Elveda) |
| 2007 | PowerTürk Music Awards | Best Music Video (Elveda) |
| 2008 | MÜ-YAP Music Industry Awards | Gold Album (Nöbetçi Aşık) |
