= Dans Et =

Studio album by Demet Akalın
- Released: 11 March 2008
- Genre: Pop, dance-pop
- Length: 1:01:13
- Label: Seyhan Müzik
- Producer: Bülent Seyhan

Demet Akalın chronology
Kusursuz 19 (2006)	Dans Et (2008)	Zirve (2010)

Singles from Dans Et
- 1. "Mucize" Released: 18 March 2008; 2. "Bebek" Released: 7 June 2008; 3. "Selam Söyle" Released: 25 August 2008; 4. "Gururum" Released: 4 November 2008; 5. "Dans Et" Released: 24 February 2009

Dans Et (Dance!) is the fifth studio album by the Turkish pop singer Demet Akalın, released on 1 March 2008 in Turkey by Seyhan Müzik. The album was later released in Azerbaijan, Syria, Romania, Bulgaria and other East European countries. The album sold approximately 128,000 copies in Turkey alone.

== Track listing ==
No.	Title	Lyrics	Music	Length
1.	"Dans Et"	Ersay Üner	Ersay Üner	4:49
2.	"Mucize"	Ersay Üner	Ersay Üner	4:44
3.	"Bebek"	Ersay Üner	Ersay Üner	4:45
4.	"Gururum"	Emirkan	Emirkan	5:10
5.	"Çekilmiyor"	Ersay Üner	Ersay Üner	4:16
6.	"Selam Söyle"	Ülkü Aker	Enrico Macias	4:40
7.	"Geç Kalmadın Mı?"	Ersay Üner	Ersay Üner	4:55
8.	"Aldatıldım"	Ersay Üner	Ersay Üner	5:11
9.	"Gölge Etme"	Sezen Aksu	Hurşid Yenigün	3:51
10.	"Bulamadım"	Cengiz İmren	Cengiz İmren	3:39
11.	"Kına Yak"	Arzu Alsan	Arzu Alsan	2:57
12.	"Mucize (Remix)"	Ersay Üner	Ersay Üner	4:43
13.	"Dans Et (Remix)"	Ersay Üner	Ersay Üner	6:02
14.	"İki Kelime"	Ersay Üner	Ersay Üner	1:24
Total length:				1:01:13

== Charts ==
List of singles
Single	Year	Peak
Single	Year	TR
"Mucize"	2008	1
"Bebek"	2008	17
"Selam Söyle"	2008	18

== Sales ==
Country	Certification	Sales
Turkey (MÜ-YAP)	Gold	128,000
