= Alişan =

Turkish singer-actor (born 1976)

- Born: Serkan Burak Tektaş; 19 June 1976 (age 49); Beyoğlu, Istanbul, Turkey
- Other names: Alişan Serkan Tektaş
- Occupations: Singer, television presenter, actor
- Spouse: Buse Varol (m. 2018)
- Children: 2
- Musical career
- Genres: Arabesque; fantasy; folk
- Years active: 1991 – present

Alişan Serkan Tektaş (born Serkan Burak Tektaş; 19 June 1976), better known as Alişan, is a Turkish singer and actor.

He is known for the role of Ferhat in the spin-off television series Cennet Mahallesi of the gypsy comedy film Gırgıriye.

== Early life and education ==
He was born in Şişhane district of Istanbul. His family is of Kurdish descent from Kiğı, Bingöl Province.

He graduated from Kuvay-ı Milliye primary school, Private Şişli College secondary school, and Private Evrim High School, respectively.

== Career ==
While still in high school, he recorded his first album. In 1997, his first hit album Sana Birşey Olmasın was released.

== Discography ==
=== Albums ===
- Derdo – Elazığ'ın Güzelleri (as Serkan Burak) – 1991 (Minerva Müzik)
- Delimisin Ne? (as Serkan Burak) – 1994 (Umut Plak)
- Aşık Oldum – 1996 (Kral Müzik)
- Sana Bir Şey Olmasın – 1997 (Prestij Müzik)
- Var Ya – 1999 (Prestij Müzik)
- Kara Çadır – 2000 (Umut Plak)
- Alişan – 2001 (Prestij Müzik)
- Söz Mü? – 2002 (Popüler Müzik)
- Keje – 2003 (Prestij Müzik)
- Kalbim Ellerinde – 2004 (Akbaş Müzik)
- Olay Bitmiştir – 2005 (Avrupa Müzik)
- Ve Kimselere Güvenmiyorum – 2007 (Erol Köse Production)
- Senfonik Çağdaş İlahiler – 2007 (Erol Köse Production)
- Sevgilerimle – 2008 (Seyhan Müzik)
- 10 – 2011 (Kaya Müzik)
- Melekler İmza Topluyor – 2011 (Kaya Müzik)
- Seni Biraz Fazla Sevdim – 2013 (Poll Production)
- İhtiyacı Var – 2014 (Poll Production)

=== Singles ===
- Ölümsüz Aşklar – 2016 (Avrupa Müzik)
- Uslu Dururum – 2017 (Avrupa Müzik)
- Zor Sensiz – 2017 (Avrupa Müzik)
- Milletin Duâsı (with various artists) – 2018 (Poll Production)
- Biliyorum Dönmeyecek – 2018 (Avrupa Müzik)
- İlahi Adalet – 2018 (Avrupa Müzik)
- Yağmurlar (with Furkan Özsan) – 2019 (Avrupa Müzik)
- Tükeneceğiz (with Tefo) – 2021 (Avrupa Müzik)
- Dön Hadi – 2022 (Avrupa Müzik)
- Öldüren Sevda (with Belgin Tunçbilek) – 2022 (Avrupa Müzik)
- Olsun – 2023 (Ölmez Müzik)
- Sen Aldırma (from the album İbrahim Erkal Hürmet 3) – 2023 (Ulus Müzik)
- Sormaz mıyım? (with Ceylan) – 2024 (Ceylan Müzik)

== Filmography ==
- Aynalı Tahir (Aynalı Tahir) (TV series) (Star TV) – 1998–1999
- Kurt Kapanı (Falçata Kemal) (TV series) (TGRT) – 2000
- Aşkına Eşkıya (Berşan) (TV series) (TGRT, Show TV) – 2001–2002
- Papatya ile Karabiber (Karabiber) (TV film) – 2004
- Cennet Mahallesi (Ferhat) (TV series) (Show TV) – 2004–2007
- Gonca Karanfil (Karanfil Kemal) (TV series) (ATV) – 2008
- Mert İle Gert (Guest appearance-himself) (TV series) (TRT 1) – 2008
- İbret-i Ailem (Guest appearance-himself) (TV series) (Star TV) – 2012
- Güldür Güldür (Guest appearance-himself) (Show TV) – 2014
- Dostlar Mahallesi (Metin) (TV series) (Kanal D) – 2017
- Seksenler (Guest appearance) (TV series) (TRT1) – (2021)

== Programs ==
- Alişan'lı Gece (TGRT) (2003–2004)
- Mavi Ay (ATV) (presented together with Asuman Krause) (2006)
- Daha Ne Olsun (FOX) (presented together with Demet Akalın) (2007)
- İlle de Roman Olsun (Show TV) (presented together with Çağla Şıkel) (2008–2009)
- Herşey Dahil (Show TV) (presented together with Çağla Şıkel) (2009)
- Tabu (FOX) (presented together with Çağla Şıkel) (2011)
- Ayşe&Alişan (Star TV) (presented together with Ayşe Özyılmazel) (2012)
- Alişan&Sevcan (Star TV) (presented together with Ayşe Özyılmazel and then with Sevcan Orhan) (2012–2013)
- Herşey Dahil (Show TV) (presented together with Çağla Şıkel) (2013–2015)
- Herşey Dahil (Kanal 360) (2016–2017) (presented together with Çağla Şıkel)
- Ailecek Şanslıyız (TV8) (2019–2020)
- Demet ve Alişan'la Sabah Sabah (Star TV) (2020–2021) (presented together with Demet Akalın)
- Hayata Gülümse (TRT1) (2021–)
