= Ebru Yaşar =

Turkish pop music singer (born 1977)

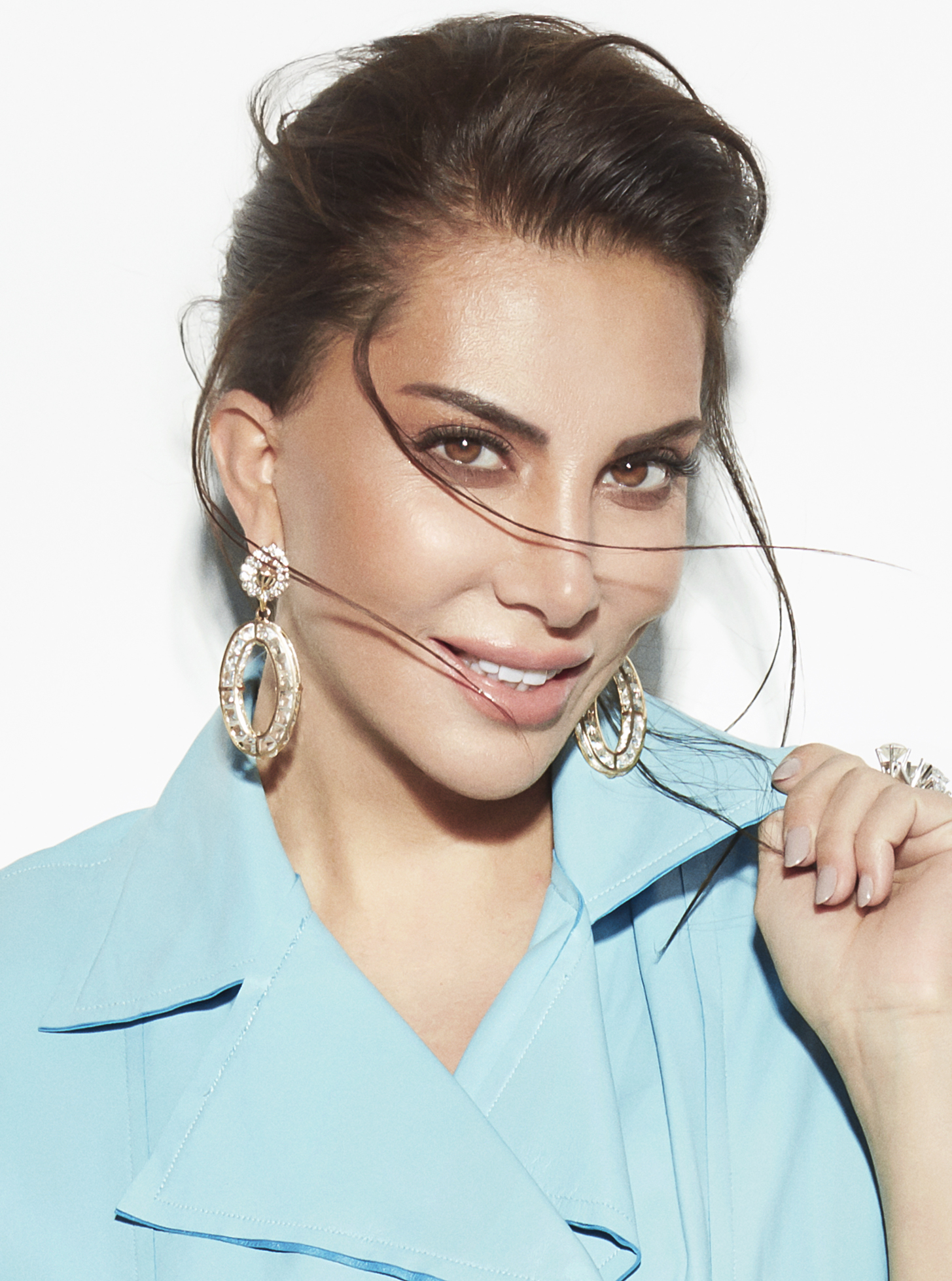
- Yaşar in 2017
- Born: 8 August 1977 (age 48); Ankara, Turkey
- Occupations: Singer; TV presenter
- Spouse: Necat Gülseven (m. 2015)
- Children: 2
- Musical career
- Genres: Pop folk; Arabesque
- Years active: 1995–present
- Labels: Burhan Çaçan; İdobay; Erol Köse; Avrupa; Livadi; Seven; DMC
- Website: www.ebruyasar.com.tr

Ebru Yaşar (pronounced [ebˈɾuː jaˈʃaɾ]; born 8 August 1977) is a Turkish pop music singer.

== Life and career ==
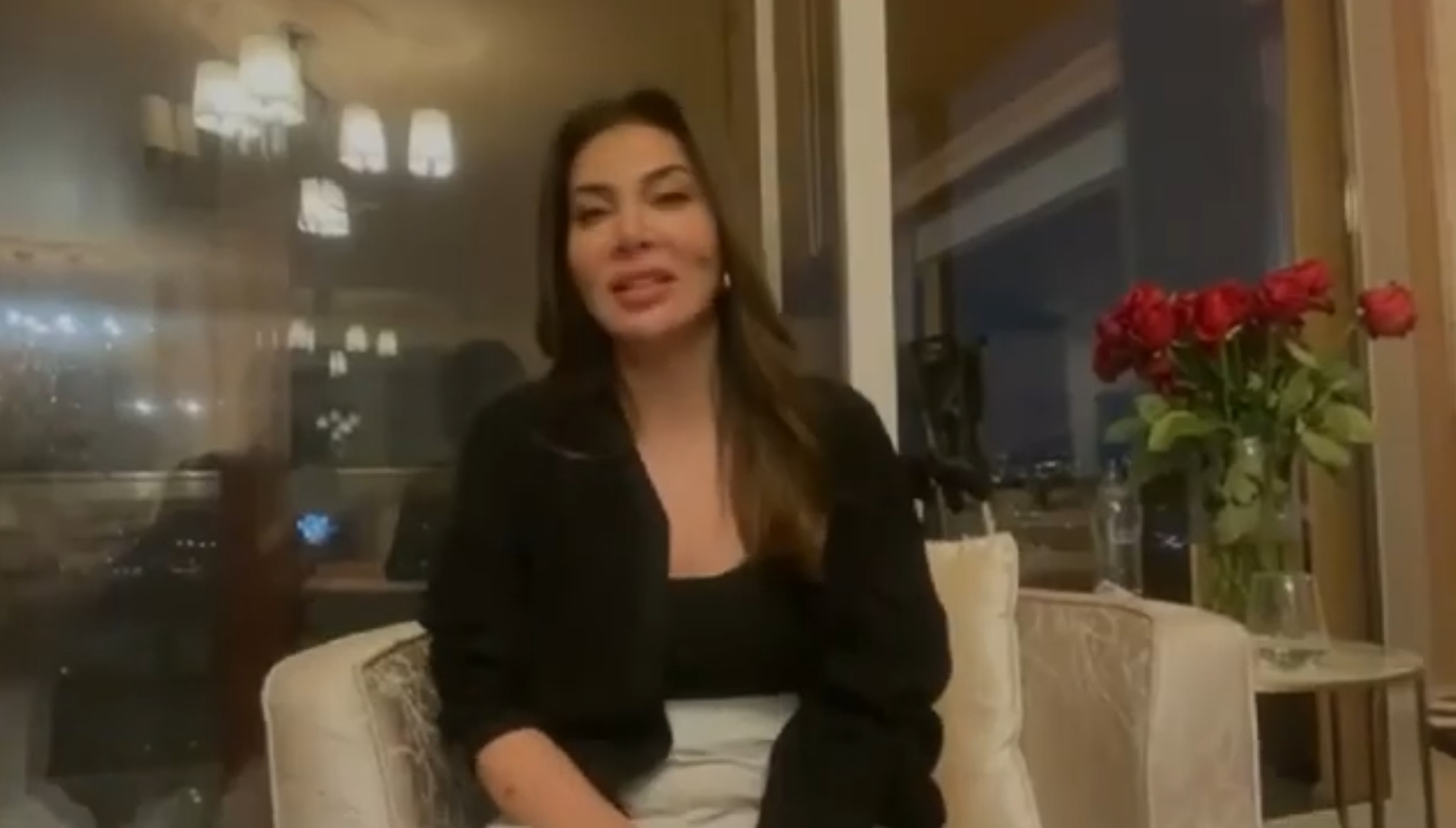
Yaşar in 2022

Yaşar was born in Ankara as the child of a family of Kurdish origin from Ağrı. She is a graduate of ITU Turkish Music State Conservatory. Yaşar was 17 when she released her debut album Bu Sahilde (On this Beach) in 1995. That year, she won the Female Singer of the Year Award of Turkish Magazine Journalists Association. In 1999, with the aid of İbrahim Tatlıses, she released the album Seni Anan Benim Için Doğurmuş. The title track from this album was incredibly popular (sold more than 1 million records) and won Yaşar awards in the 6th Kral TV Video Music Awards. After another 4 years, in 2003 she released the album Aşkımız Buraya Kadar which embodied hit songs such as "Aşkımız Buraya Kadar", "Yeminim Var" and "O Değil". In summer of 2006, Yaşar released the long-awaited album Yeşillenirim. The album was immensely popular, the best selling of all her albums. The song "Yeşillenirim" was played for weeks on end on Turkish TV. radio stations.

At the end of 2008, a new album was launched. "Seviyorum Seni" was in a duet with İsmail YK and it was considered a major hit in Turkish pop music. In 2011 she released the album Delidir, in which she sang in Turkish, Kurdish, and Arabic.

== Discography ==
Albums

- Bu Sahilde (Çaçan Müzik 1995)
- Sevenler Ölmez (Çaçan Müzik 1997)
- Seni Anan Benim İçin Doğurmuş (İdobay 1999)
- Aşkımız Buraya Kadar (İdobay 2003)
- Yeşillenirim (Erol Köse 2006)
- Seviyorum Seni (Avrupa Müzik 2008)
- Delidir (DMC 2011)
- Sanat-ı Ebru (Uluçınar Müzik 2013)
- Haddinden Fazla (DMC 2017)
- Gel de Sevme (DMC & EY Müzik 2021)

EPs

- Yine Çalıyor (EY Müzik 2024)

Singles

- "Ağlayamıyorum" (2012)
- "Cumartesi" (2014)
- "Alev Alev" (2019)
- "Kalmam" (2020)
- "İçime Ata Ata" (with Burak Bulut and Kurtuluş Kuş) (2021)
- "Kehribar" (with Burak Bulut) (2023)
- "Yoksun" (with Siyam) (2024)
- "Anılara Dalarız" (with Burak Bulut and Kurtuluş Kuş) (2024)
- "Yıllar Sonra" (2025)
- "Affet" (with Burak Bulut) (2025)
- "Sanmadan Git" (with Sıla Şahin and Samet Kardeşler) (2025)
