= Gölcük Barbaros Hayrettin High School =

Coordinates: 40.7208°N 29.8333°E

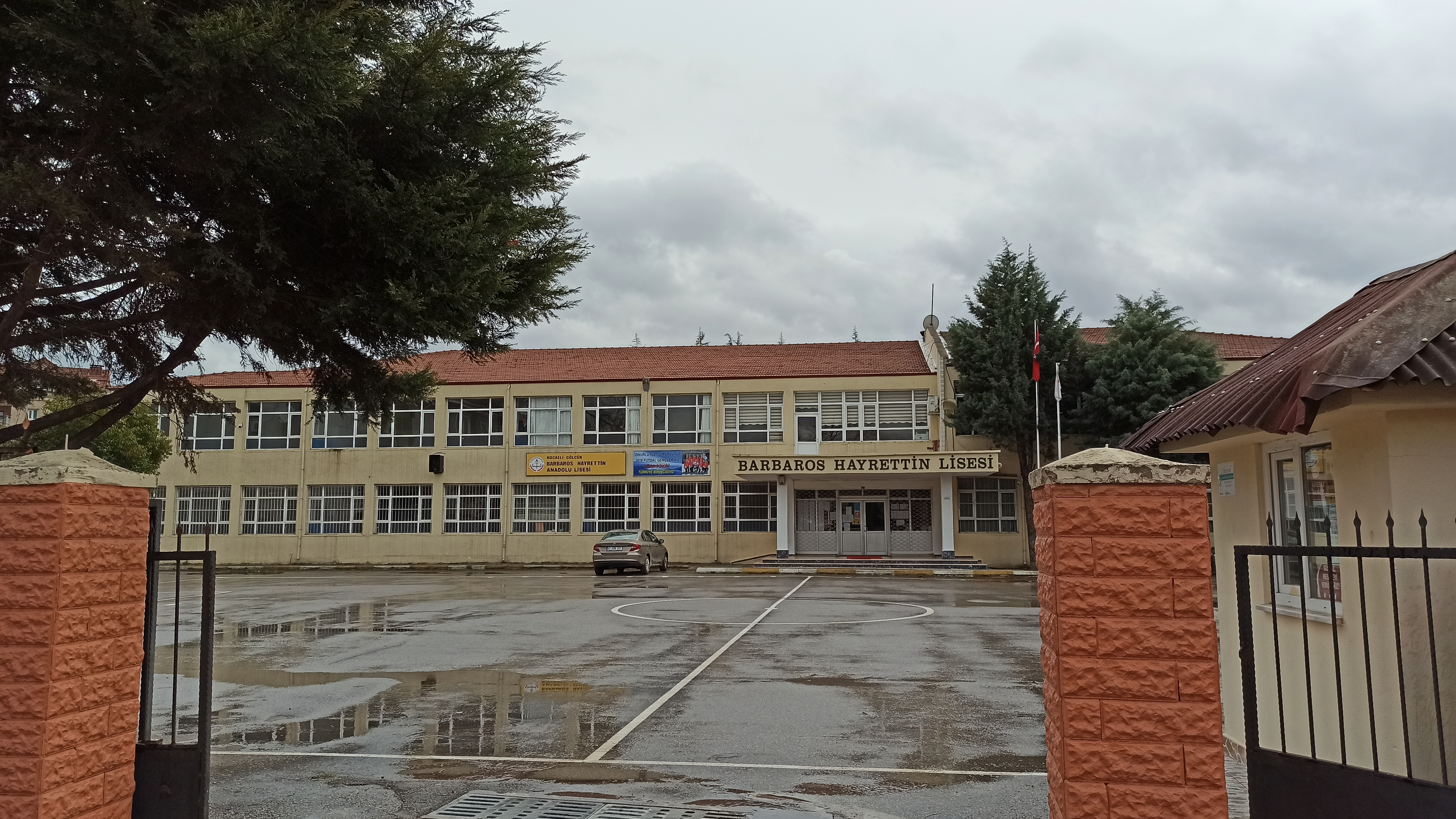
- Gölcük Barbaros Hayrettin Lisesi
- Kavaklı Sahil C. 41650 Gölcük, Kocaeli; Turkey

Information
- Type: Public
- Motto: Sun After Storm; Post tempestas sol solis!
- Established: 1958
- School district: Gölcük
- Principal: Mehmet Toluç
- Enrollment: 541 Total Students
- Colors: Yellow, Black
- Mascot: Paşa
- Newspaper: BarSayfa
- Information: +90 (262) 413 12 30
- Website: www.gbhl.k12.tr

Gölcük Barbaros Hayrettin High School (Turkish: Gölcük Barbaros Hayrettin Lisesi), is a public high school in Gölcük, Kocaeli, Turkey. The school is named after Ottoman admiral Hayreddin Barbarossa.

Short form of the school name is GBHL. Formed in 1958 as "Gölcük Lisesi" (GL), the high school named as "Barbaros Hayrettin Lisesi" in 1970 when it moved to its own building from the provisional location.

The colors of the school are black (symbolizing the deadly ferry accident on 1 March 1958 in which hundreds of high school students died in Gulf of İzmit) and yellow (symbolizing the sun/GBHL rising after this disaster).

In the devastating earthquake epicentered in Gölcük on 17 August 1999, GBHL lost many of its students and faculty residing in Gölcük and surrounding towns.

The buildings of the high school has been damaged, however later been repaired by the efforts of its alumni association and some international relief organizations.

== Notable graduates ==
- Hikmet Karaman / Football manager
- Ayhan Bölükbaşı / Journalist
- Erdoğan Arıkan / TV presenter
- Şengül Balıksırtı / Journalist
- Demet Akalın / Pop singer
- Sefa Sirmen / Politician
- Haluk Kaplanoğlu / Warner Bross Turkey, CEO
- İlker Yasin* / TV presenter
- Ahmet Özhan* / Turkish court music singer
- Toygar Işıklı* / Composer

== Sister schools ==
- Robert College, Istanbul
- Koç Lisesi, Istanbul
- Het Bredero College, Amsterdam
