= Uğur Işılak =

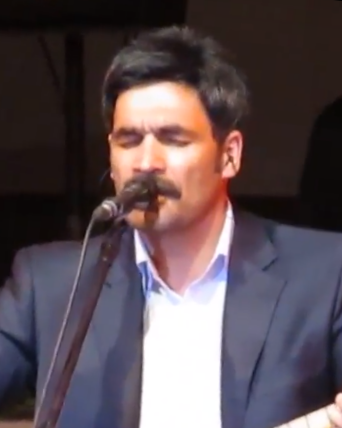

Member of the Grand National Assembly (25th Parliament)
- In office 7 June 2015 – 1 November 2015
- Constituency: Istanbul

Personal details
- Born: 15 November 1971 (age 54) Velbert, North Rhine-Westphalia, Germany
- Occupation: Politician, singer, composer, poet
- Website: www.ugurisilak.com.tr
- Musical career
- Genres: Anatolian rock, Turkish folk
- Instruments: Bağlama, ney, oud, guitar
- Years active: 1988–present
- Labels: Günalp, Raks, Divan, Akbaş, Ulus, TZN, Olimpiyat, SimKlas Media, TFM

Uğur Işılak (born 15 November 1971) is a Turkish musician, composer and politician.

At the 7 June 2015 general elections in Turkey, he became a member of the 25th term of the Turkish Parliament for Istanbul Province representing the ruling AK Party.

== Early life and education ==
Işılak was born on 15 November 1971 in Velbert to Ahmet Işılak and his wife Arife. He is originally from Ankara's Şereflikoçhisar district. Işılak became involved with music at a young age. After completing his primary, secondary and high school education in Germany, his family moved to Istanbul, the largest city in Turkey, in 1983. He graduated from Konya Selçuk University's Literature Faculty. Işılak speaks fluent German and semi-fluent English.

== Musical career ==
Işılak began his career as a professional musician in 1987. He has gone in for more than a thousand cultural and art activities in Turkey, Europe, America, Australia and Central Asia for almost 30 years. He made more than 20 records (albums). Among these, are important albums which were compiled and composed from important Turkish poets like Necip Fazıl Kısakürek, Mehmet Akif Ersoy, Kanuni Sultan Süleyman (Süleyman the Magnificent) and Yavuz Sultan Selim, poets representing parts of Turkey's 1000 year literary history. He was granted many awards for his cultural contributions. He made cultural and art programs for many national channels particularly in TRT Haber, TRT Müzik, Kanal 7, Samanyolu TV, 24, ATV and 360 He is still making these programs. In addition to these, he prepared the AK Party's election songs: "Haydi Anadolu" (Come on Anatolia) in 2002, "Herşey Türkiye İçin" (Turkey for Everything) in 2008, "İnandık Hakka" (We believe in God) and "Dombra" in 2014.

== Political life ==
After preparing AK Party's election songs, He was elected as an AK Party Member of Parliament at the June 2015 general election.

== Albums ==
- Duy Sesimi (1996)
- Dönen Alçak Olsun (1998)
- Söyleyeceklerim Var (2000)
- Yıldırım Gibi (2001)
- Haydi Anadolu(Single) (2002)
- Ben Ağlarsam Kıyamet Kopar (2002)
- Kalabalık Yalnızlara & Ozanca (2004)
- Kalabalık Yalnızlara (2005)
- Sil Baştan (2006)
- Aşkın Cenazesi Var (2007)
- Sizin Gibi Değilim (2008)
- Artık Geç Oldu (2009)
- Miras 1 (2011)
- Üstad (2012)
- Makam-ı Sultan (2013)
- Akifçe (2014)
- 2 CD 2 Kelam (2015)
- Kac geceler aklinda? (with İlker Başbuğ) (2021)
