= Sebebim =

Studio album by Demet Akalın
- Released: 13 September 1996
- Genre: Pop
- Length: 42:53
- Language: Turkish
- Label: Elenor
- Producer: Muhteşem Candan; Atilla Alpsakarya

Demet Akalın chronology
Sebebim (1996)	Yalan Sevdan (2000)

Sebebim (My Reason) is the debut studio album by Turkish singer Demet Akalın. It was released in 1996 by Elenor Müzik. The lyrics and musics were provided by a number of different individuals, including Seda Akay, Niran Ünsal, Hakkı Yalçın, Murat Yerinli, Naşide Göktürk, Tolga Turan, Engin Kuduğ, Özlem Ekşioğlu, Metin Özülkü, and Ayhan Çakar. Tarık Sezer, Metin Özülkü, and Selim Çaldıran served as the album's arrangers. The songs "Sebebim", "Asla Affedilmez" and "Sakın Vazgeçme" were pieces from this album that were turned into music videos.

Naim Dilmener wrote in his review for Hürriyet that Akalın was still inexperienced and her shaky vocals made the album poorly received.

== Track listing ==
No.	Title	Lyrics	Music	Arrangement	Length
1.	"Sebebim"	Seda Akay	Niran Ünsal	Tarık Sezer	4:46
2.	"Dost Kalamam"	Hakkı Yalçın	Metin Özülkü	Metin Özülkü	3:36
3.	"Sakın Vazgeçme"	Murat Yerinli	Murat Yerinli	Tarık Sezer	3:33
4.	"Düğüm"	Naşide Göktürk	Naşide Göktürk	Tarık Sezer	4:44
5.	"Asla Affedilmez"	Tolga Turan	Engin Kuduğ	Tarık Sezer	4:50
6.	"Kör Olası"	Özlem Ekşioğlu	Özlem Ekşioğlu	Tarık Sezer	4:41
7.	"Özür Dilerim"	Metin Özülkü	Metin Özülkü	Metin Özülkü	3:51
8.	"Avut Beni"	Ayhan Çakar	Ayhan Çakar	Tarık Sezer	3:53
9.	"Kanayaklı"	Özlem Ekşioğlu	Özlem Ekşioğlu	Tarık Sezer	5:07
10.	"Zor Sevda"	Seda Akay	Selim Çaldıran	Selim Çaldıran	3:52
Total length:					42:53

== Personnel ==
- Supervisor: Demet Akalın
- Producer: Atilla Alpsakarya
- Production: Elenor Müzik
- Producer: Muhteşem Candan
- Photographs: Erol Atar
- Make-up: Neriman Kardeş
- Hair: Diba / Mahmut Ebil
- Print: FRS Matbaacılık
- Design: FRS Graphic Services Lütfü Çolak

Credits adapted from Discogs.

== Release history ==
Country	Date	Format	Label	Ref.
Turkey	September 1996	CD	Elenor Müzik	
