= Unuttum =

Studio album by Demet Akalın
- Released: 30 May 2003
- Genre: Fantezi; pop
- Length: 54:32
- Language: Turkish
- Label: Peker

Demet Akalın chronology
Yalan Sevdan (EP) (2000)	Unuttum (2003)	Banane (2004)

Unuttum (I've Forgotten) is the second studio album by Turkish singer Demet Akalın. It was released om 30 May 2003 by Peker Müzik. All of the new songs in the album were written by Ersay Üner and a number of cover versions performed by Akalın were included in it as well. Three music videos were made for the album's lead single, "Unuttum", as well as the songs "Gazete" and "Allahından Bul".

== Track listing ==
No.	Title	Lyrics	Music	Length
1.	"Unuttum"	Nalan Tokyürek	Nalan Tokyürek	4:21
2.	"Yana Yana"	Ersay Üner	Ersay Üner	4:07
3.	"Allahından Bul"	Ersay Üner	Ersay Üner	4:31
4.	"Aklım Hep Sende"	Kurtuluş	Kurtuluş	4:09
5.	"Doğruyu Söyle"	Ersay Üner	Ersay Üner	4:49
6.	"Sana Veda"	Ersay Üner	Ersay Üner	3:54
7.	"Gazete"	Ersay Üner	Ersay Üner	4:15
8.	"Değmezmiş"	Ersay Üner	Ersay Üner	4:39
9.	"Sen Mutlu Ol"	Ersay Üner	Ersay Üner	5:38
10.	"Allahından Bul" (Version 2)	Ersay Üner	Ersay Üner	4:35
11.	"Tanrıya Kaldı"	Soner Arıca	Soner Arıca	4:38
12.	"Seni Seviyorum"	Selami Şahin	Selami Şahin	4:56
Total length:				54:32

== Personnel ==
Credits adapted from Discogs.

=== Music ===
Singer: Demet Akalın; Backing vocals: Cihan Okan, Ezgi Üstün, Kutsi, Murat Çekem, Ufuk Yıldırım, Yeşim Vatan, Yonca Kocadağ; Acoustic guitar: Ayhan Günyıl, Erdem Sökmen; Classic guitar: Edinç Senyaylar; Bağlama: Ali Yılaz	Oud: Hüseyin Bitmez; Ney: Eyüp Hamiş; Violin: Gündem Yaylı Grubu; Bass: İsmail Soyberk; Clarinet: Kirpi Bülent

=== Production ===
- Executive Production: Ersay Üner, Demet Akalın
- Production: Ersay Üner, Demet Akalın
- Mixing: Serkan Kula, Arzu Aslan
- Mastering: Cem Büyükuzun

== Release history ==
Country	Date	Format	Label	Ref.
Turkey	30 May 2003	CD · digital download	Peker Müzik	
Worldwide	30 May 2003	CD · digital download	Peker Müzik	
