= Serdar Ortaç =

Kurdish-Turkish singer, songwriter, and composer (born 1970)

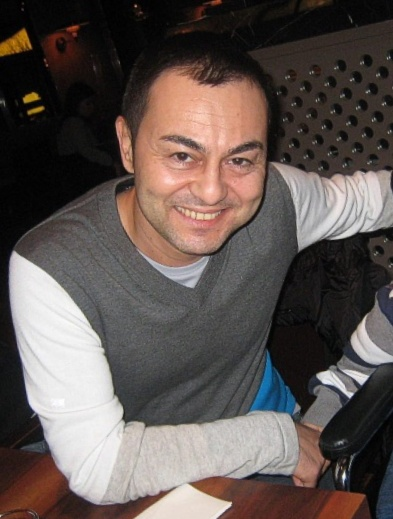
- Born: 16 February 1970 (age 56); Istanbul, Turkey
- Occupations: Singer; musician; songwriter; composer; record producer
- Spouse: Chloe Loughnan (m. 2014; div. 2019)
- Musical career
- Genres: Pop
- Years active: 1994–present
- Labels: Raks; Universal; Emre

Serdar Ortaç (born 16 February 1970) is a Turkish singer, songwriter and composer from Istanbul. He is known as one of the most popular singers in Turkish pop-music history.

== Personal life ==
He was born in Istanbul. His father is a Crimean Tatar from Kastamonu, and his mother is Kurdish from Urfa. Serdar Ortaç married Irish model Chloe Loughnan in 2014. Loughnan appeared in one of Serdar Ortaç's videos and was a judge on the popular fashion show Bu Tarz Benim. The two divorced in August 2019.

== Discography ==
=== Albums ===
==== Studio albums ====
List of albums, sales and certifications
| Album | Album info | Certifications | Sales |
|---|---|---|---|
| Aşk İçin | Released: 17 August 1994 (TR); Label: Raks Müzik; Format: CD, Cassette | | |
| Yaz Yağmuru | Released: 1 March 1996 (TR); Label: Raks Müzik; Format:CD, Cassette | | |
| Gecelerin Adamı | Released: 10 July 1998 (TR); Label: Raks Müzik; Format: CD, Cassette | | |
| Bilsem Ki | Released: 21 October 1999 (TR); Label: Universal Music; Format: CD, Cassette | | |
| Okyanus | Released: 10 July 2002 (TR); Label: Universal Music; Format: CD, cassette, digital download | | |
| Çakra | Released: 12 March 2004 (TR); Label: Emre Grafson Müzik; Format: CD, cassette, digital download | MÜ-YAP: Diamond | Turkey: 812,500 |
| Mesafe | Released: 25 April 2006 (TR); Label: Emre Grafson Müzik; Format: CD, cassette, digital download | MÜ-YAP: Diamond | Turkey: 403,000 |
| Nefes | Released: 22 May 2008 (TR); Label: Emre Grafson Müzik; Format: CD, cassette, digital download | MÜ-YAP: Diamond | Turkey: 302,000 |
| Kara Kedi | Released: 14 May 2010 (TR); Label: Emre Grafson Müzik; Format: CD, digital download | | Turkey: 201,100 |
| Ray | Released: 11 June 2012 (TR); Label: Emre Grafson Müzik; Format: CD, digital download | | Turkey: 80,000 |
| Bana Göre Aşk | Released: 26 May 2014 (TR); Label: Emre Grafson Müzik; Format: CD, cassette, digital download | | Turkey: 60,000 |
| Çek Elini Kalbimden | Released: 6 May 2015 (TR); Label: Emre Grafson Müzik; Format: CD, cassette, digital download | | |
| Gıybet | Released: 11 May 2016 (TR); Label: Emre Grafson Müzik; Format: CD, cassette, digital download | | |
| Cımbız | Released: 16 October 2017 (TR); Label: Emre Grafson Müzik; Format: CD, cassette, digital download | | |

==== Compilation albums ====
List of albums
| Album | Album info |
|---|---|
| Sahibinin Sesi Remix | Released: 7 May 2001 (TR); Label: Universal Music; Format: CD, digital download |
| Serdar Ortaç Klasikleri | Released: 26 October 2004 (TR); Label: Emre Grafson Müzik; Format: CD, digital download |
| Arşiv (3 CD) | Released: 26 January 2015 (TR); Label: Emre Grafson Müzik; Format: CD, digital download |

==== Remix albums ====
List of albums
| Album | Album info |
|---|---|
| Gold Remix | Released: 2 April 2007 (TR); Label: Emre Grafson Müzik; Format: CD, digital download |
| Gold Remix 2009 | Released: 13 March 2009 (TR); Label: Emre Grafson Müzik; Format: CD, digital download |
| Gold Remix 2011 | Released: 7 March 2011 (TR); Label: Emre Grafson Müzik; Format: CD, digital download |
| Serdar Bizi Diskoya Götür | Released: 10 July 2015 (TR); Label: Emre Grafson Müzik; Format: CD, digital download |

==== EPs ====
List of EPs
| EP | EP info |
|---|---|
| Loco Para Amar | Released: 15 April 1997 (TR); Label: Ulus Müzik; Format: Cassette |

==== Live albums ====
List of albums
| Album | Album info |
|---|---|
| İstanbul Konserleri | Released: 18 December 2007 (TR); Label: Emre Grafson Müzik; Format: DVD |

==== Acoustic albums ====
List of albums
| Album | Album info |
|---|---|
| Serdar Ortaç Akustik, Vol. 1 | Released: 7 April 2023 (TR); Label: Poll Production; Format: Digital download |
| Serdar Ortaç Akustik, Vol. 2 | Released: 10 November 2023 (TR); Label: Poll Production; Format: Digital download |

=== Singles ===
List of singles
| Album | Album info |
|---|---|
| Benim Gibi Olmayacak (feat. Tan Taşçı) | Released: 26 September 2011 (TR); Label: Kaya Müzik; Format: CD, digital download |
| Sürgün | Released: 11 December 2018 (TR); Label: Emre Grafson Müzik; Format: CD, digital download |
| Yadigar | Released: 19 June 2019 (TR); Label: Emre Grafson Müzik; Format: CD, digital download |
| Ok Çıkmış Yaydan | Released: 5 February 2020 (TR); Label: Emre Grafson Müzik; Format: Digital download |
| Biz İstemezsek | Released: 1 July 2020 (TR); Label: Emre Grafson Müzik; Format: Digital download |
| Işığını Benimle Paylaş (feat. Seçil Gür, Başak Gümülcine) | Released: 26 October 2020 (TR); Label: Start Up Production; Format: Digital download |
| Adalet (feat. Kaan Yıldız) | Released: 26 March 2021 (TR); Label: Poll Production; Format: Digital download |
| Yalnız Şehir | Released: 22 November 2021 (TR); Label: Emre Grafson Müzik; Format: Digital download |
| Mesafe (feat. Sinan Akçıl) | Released: 24 March 2022 (TR); Label: Merzigo Music Distribution; Format: Digital download |
| Fırtına (feat. Nihan Çelik) | Released: 27 May 2022 (TR); Label: Noah Entertainment; Format: Digital download |
| Haber Gelmiyor Yardan (feat. Sinan Akçıl) | Released: 1 September 2022 (TR); Label: Merzigo Music Distribution; Format: Digital download |
| İlaç | Released: 8 September 2022 (TR); Label: Emre Grafson Müzik; Format: Digital download |
| Kim Bulmuş Aşkı | Released: 25 January 2023 (TR); Label: Emre Grafson Müzik; Format: Digital download |
| Bilsem Ki (feat. Mehmet Çevik) | Released: 2 June 2023 (TR); Label: Avrupa Müzik; Format: Digital download |
| Pare Pare | Released: 11 July 2023 (TR); Label: Emre Grafson Müzik; Format: Digital download |
| Ferhat | Released: 11 August 2023 (TR); Label: Emre Grafson Müzik; Format: Digital download |
| Dansöz (feat. Kylin Milan) | Released: 29 September 2023 (TR); Label: Golden Gate; Format: Digital download |
| Söyle Ona | Released: 8 February 2024 (TR); Label: Emre Grafson Müzik; Format: Digital download |
| Aşk Böceği | Released: 16 May 2024 (TR); Label: Emre Grafson Müzik; Format: Digital download |
| Ayrılmam (feat. MEF) | Released: 21 June 2024 (TR); Label: RO Music; Format: Digital download |
| Sana Değmez (feat. Şeref Altınbaş) | Released: 12 July 2024 (TR); Label: Offtune Records; Format: Digital download |
| Dön Aslanım (feat. Pınar Darcan) | Released: 14 February 2025 (TR); Label: Pınar Darcan; Format: Digital download |
| Yasemin (feat. Burak Bulut) | Released: 28 February 2025 (TR); Label: Emre Grafson Müzik; Format: Digital download |
| Kış Kış | Released: 6 June 2025 (TR); Label: Emre Grafson Müzik; Format: Digital download |
| Heyecan (feat. Tefo and Seko) | Released: 30 July 2025 (TR); Label: Poll Production; Format: Digital download |
| Göçebe (feat. Cakal) | Released: 8 August 2025 (TR); Label: Poll Production; Format: Digital download |
| Kemik | Released: 16 December 2025 (TR); Label: Emre Grafson Müzik; Format: Digital download |
| Niye Niye (feat. Burak King) | Released: 26 December 2025 (TR); Label: Emre Grafson Müzik; Format: Digital download |

=== Charts ===
Position of songs on different lists, year of publication and albums' names
| Song | Year | Peak (TR) | Album |
|---|---|---|---|
| "Sor" | 2006 | 1 | Mesafe |
| "Dansöz" | 2006 | 5 | Mesafe |
| "Gitme" | 2006 | 1 | Mesafe |
| "Mesafe" | 2007 | — | Mesafe |
| "Gel De" | 2007 | — | Mesafe |
| "Şeytan" | 2008 | 1 | Nefes |
| "Gram" | 2008 | 1 | Nefes |
| "Nefes" | 2008 | — | Nefes |
| "Heyecan" | 2008 | 9 | Nefes |
| "Sana Değmez" | 2009 | — | Nefes |
| "Bu Da Geçer" | 2009 | — | Nefes |
| "Hadi Çal" | 2009 | — | Nefes |
| "İki Gözüm" | 2009 | — | Gold Remix 2009 |
| "Poşet" | 2010 | 2 | Kara Kedi |
| "Mikrop" | 2010 | 10 | Kara Kedi |
| "İşim Olmaz" | 2010 | 7 | Kara Kedi |
| "Haksızlık" | 2010 | — | Kara Kedi |
| "Kolayca" | 2011 | — | Kara Kedi |
| "Elimle" | 2011 | 5 | Gold Remix 2011 |
| "Hile" | 2011 | — | Gold Remix 2011 |
| "Yeşil Su" | 2011 | — | Kara Kedi |
| "Hayat İzi" | 2012 | — | Gold Remix 2011 |
| "Üzecek Adam Çok" | 2012 | — | Ray |
| "Ne Bu Neşe" | 2012 | — | Ray |
| "Tanrım" | 2014 | — | Bana Göre Aşk |
| "İzin Ver Aşkım" | 2014 | — | Bana Göre Aşk |
| "Bana Göre Aşk Yok" | 2014 | — | Bana Göre Aşk |
| "Konuş – Çek Elini Kalbimden" | 2015 | — | Çek Elini Kalbimden |
| "Balım" (feat. Otilia) | 2015 | — | Çek Elini Kalbimden |
| "Nankör" | 2015 | — | Çek Elini Kalbimden |
| "İki Deli" (feat. Hande Yener) | 2015 | 3 | İki Deli |
"—" indicates that the songs were not included in the lists or the results were not disclosed.

== Awards ==
| year | organization | category |
|---|---|---|
| 1995 | Kral TV Video Music Awards | Best New Artist of the Year |
| 1997 | Milliyet | Best Song of the Year "Padişah" |
| 1999 | Golden Butterfly Awards | Best Artist of the Year |
| 2000 | Kral TV Video Music Awards | Best Pop Male Artist of the Year |
| 2003 | Radio and TV Oscars | Best TV Show: "Serdar Ortaç'la Hep Beraber" |
| 2005 | Kral TV Video Music Awards | Best Pop Male Artist of the Year |
| 2005 | MÜ-YAP Music Awards | Best-Selling Album of the Year: "Beni Unut/Çakra" |
| 2006 | Kral TV Video Music Awards | Best Music Video of the Year: "Gitme" |
| 2006 | Golden Butterfly Awards | Best Pop Male Artist of the Year/ Best Song of the Year: "Dansöz" |
| 2007 | MÜ-YAP Music Awards | Best-Selling Album of the Year: "Mesafe" |
| 2009 | Golden Butterfly Awards | Best Pop Male Artist of the Year |
| 2009 | Kral TV Video Music Awards | Digital Diamond Award |
| 2010 | Kral TV Video Music Awards | Kral TV& Kral FM Special Award- Radios Most Played Artist |
| 2011 | Balkanika TV – Balkan Awards | Best Male Artist in the Balkans/ Project of the Year |
| 2012 | Kral TV Video Music Awards | Radios Most Played Artist |
| 2013 | Balkanika TV – Balkan Awards | Best Male Artist in the Balkans |
| 2017 | 4th Golden Palm Awards | Best Male Artist of the Year |
