= Ersay Üner =

Turkish pop music singer-songwriter (born 1978)

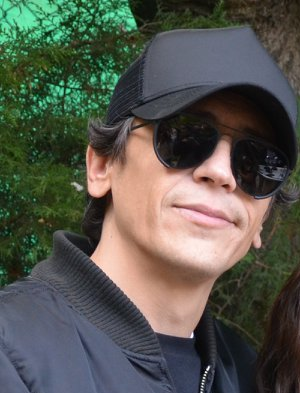
- Üner at 15th Radyo Boğaziçi Music Awards, May 2018
- Born: 7 October 1978 (age 46); Seydişehir, Konya, Turkey
- Occupation: Singer-songwriter
- Musical career
- Genres: Dance · pop
- Years active: 2004–present
- Labels: Seyhan · DMC

Ersay Üner, (born 7 October 1978) is a Turkish pop music singer-songwriter. He became known in Turkey in 2000s by writing and composing songs for Demet Akalın.

== Life and career ==
Üner was born in Seydişehir in 1978. His father worked for the municipality as a marriage official. By accompanying his father during the ceremonies, he became interested in pop music. At the age of 14, he moved to Istanbul to start making music. While in Istanbul, he joined the crew of Demet Akalın and started writing and composing songs for her. With the hit "Yılan", which was voiced by Akalın, he became famous in the music industry. Among the other songs he wrote for Akalın were "Afedersin", "Bebek", "Herkes Hak Ettiği Gibi Yaşıyor", "Mucize", "Tatil", and "Unuttum". He also gave songs to various other artists, including Ebru Gündeş. He then started a career as a singer, releasing his first single in 2015. His 2017 single "İki Aşık" became a major hit and was viewed more than 200 million times on YouTube. Üner eventually released his debut album Nokta in 2019.

== Personal life ==
He started dating actress Büşra Pekin in 2017. The couple became engaged, but called it off in November 2019.

== Discography ==
Albums

Year	Title (Details)
2019	Nokta * Label: SM Production * Released: May 16, 2019 * Format: CD, Mini-LP
2024	Taverna * Label: DMC * Released: April 19, 2024 * Format: Digital download, CD

Singles

Title	Year	Peak chart positions	Album
Title	Year	TUR	Album
"Yürüdüm"	2015	-	-
"Tatlım Tatlım"	2017	-	Nokta
"İki Aşık"	2017	2	Nokta
"Seni Soruyorlar"	2021	1	-
"Gidiyorsun"	2021	-	-
"Allı Turnam" (feat. Burcu Acı)	2021	-	-
"Duysun"	2022	-	-
"Vazgeçtim"	2022	-	-
"Sevme"	2024	-	-
"Sıktı Mı Canını"	2024	-	-
"Büyük Oyun" (with Demet Akalın)	2024	-	-
"Almıyor Aklım"	2024	-	-
"Üzdü"	2025	-	2 Şarkı
"Bizden Olmaz"	2025	-	2 Şarkı
