= Bostancı Show Center =

- Bostancı Gösteri Merkezi
- Interactive map of Bostancı Show Center
- Address: Bostanlar Arası Sk. No:8 Bostancı, Kadıköy
- Location: Istanbul, Turkey
- Coordinates: 40°57′24.0″N 29°06′09″E
- Public transit: İETT Bus Line, Metro Line
- Type: Multi-purpose convention center
- Capacity: 2,500

Construction
- Opened: 23 April 1991

Website
- bgmonline.net

The Bostancı Show Center (Turkish: Bostancı Gösteri Merkezi) is a convention center located on the Mehmet Şevki Paşa Road in Bostancı, Kadıköy, opened in 1991. It hosts many events and concerts.

== History ==
The first series of events taking place at the Bostancı Show Center following its opening on 23 April 1991 were a number of concerts between 25-28 April 1991 by Sezen Aksu, who was accompanied by artists such as Sertab Erener, Levent Yüksel, Onno Tunç, Garo Mafyan, Orhan Topçuoğlu, Cengiz Teoman and Aykut Gürel.

Mirkelam performed for the first time in a song contest organized by Show TV on 25 June 1995 at the Bostancı Show Center.

Two of Led Zeppelin members, vocalist Robert Plant and guitarist Jimmy Page, gave their first Istanbul concerts on 5-6 March 1998 at the Bostancı Show Center.

After suffering from brain hemorrhage, Ebru Gündeş gave her first concert at the Bostancı Show Center on 11 March 2000, and donated its proceeds to the Haydarpaşa Numune Training and Research Foundation Hospital.

The concert performed by Duman rock band at the Bostancı Show Center on 4 October 2003 was released as a DVD by Murat Akad.

Şebnem Ferah's concert with Orhan Şallıel's orchestra titled the Istanbul Symphonic Project took place on 10 March 2007 at the Bostancı Show Center and was later released on DVD.

Folk poet and musician Neşet Ertaş announced his concert at the Bostancı Show Center with Nuray Hafiftaş on 14 November 2009 as the last concert of his 65-year artistic career, though he later changed this decision as a result of a huge number of requests by fans.

Artist Kamil Sönmez celebrated his 45th year of career on 15 November 2012 with an event organized at the Bostancı Show Center.
