= Gökhan Tepe =

Turkish singer (born 1978)

- Born: 8 February 1978 (age 48); Istanbul, Turkey
- Genres: Pop
- Occupations: Musician; singer-songwriter; actor; composer
- Years active: 1995–present
- Website: gokhantepe.com.tr

Gökhan Tepe (born 8 February 1978) is a Turkish singer.

== Discography ==
Albums

- Çöz Beni (1995)
- Canözüm (1999)
- Belki Hüzün Belki De Aşk (2002)
- Yürü Yüreğimi (2006)
- Vur (2009)
- Aşk Sahnede (2011) (sales (TR): 20,000)
- Kendim Gibi (2012)
- Seninle Her Yere (2015)
- Yaz 2018 (2018)

Singles

- "Birkaç Beden Önce" (2011)
- "Gelsen de Anlatsam" (2014)
- "Sonsuza Kadar" (2015)
- "Sevda Çocukları" (2017)
- "Asmalı" (2019)
- "Aşık Kalbin Biliyor" (2022)
- "Belki Hüzün Belki De Aşk 2023" (2023)
- "Huysuz ve Tatlı Kadın" (feat. Emel Şenocak) (from the album Emel Şenocak'tan Yıldızlı Pekiyi) (2023)
- "Gönül Çiçeğim" (from the album İbrahim Erkal Hürmet) (2023)
- "Sen Söyle Hayat" (from the album Bülent Özdemir Şarkıları) (2024)
- "Efkârlı" (2025)
- "Derde Aşık Olmuşuz" (2025)

Charts

List of singles, release date and album name
Single	Year	Peak	Album
Single	Year	TR	Album
"Yürü Yüreğim"	2006	—	Yürü Yüreğim
"İnsanoğlu"	2006	—	Yürü Yüreğim
"Gel Aşkım"	2007	4	Yürü Yüreğim
"Kaç Kere"	2007	—	Yürü Yüreğim
"Vur"	2009	5	Vur
"Çok Özlüyorum Seni"	2009	1	Vur
"Birkaç Beden Önce"	2010	3	Birkaç Beden Önce
"Kırmızı Halı"	2011	4	Aşk Sahnede
"Yalan Olur"	2011	—	Aşk Sahnede
"Söz"	2012	2	Aşk Sahnede
"Tanrım Dert Vermesin"	2012	3	Kendim Gibi
"Üç Kelime"	2013	—	Kendim Gibi
"Adı Aşk Olsun"	2013	—	Kendim Gibi
"Veda Makamı"	2013	—	Kendim Gibi
"Gelsen De Anlatsam"	2014	1	Seninle Her Yere
"Kader"	2015	—	Seninle Her Yere
"—" indicates that the songs were not included in the lists or the results were not disclosed.

== Filmography ==
Series

- 1998: Eyvah Babam
- 2000: Benim İçin Ağlama
- 2006: Maçolar
- 2007: Elveda Derken

Movies

- 2012: Ayaz
