= Gökhan Özen =

Turkish singer and songwriter (born 1979)

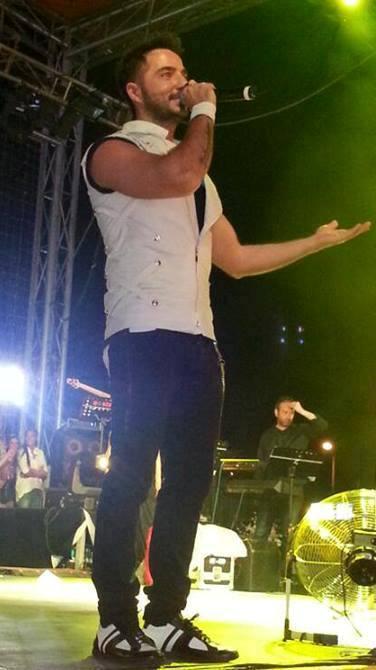
- Özen at concert in 2013

Background information
- Born: Ahmet Gökhan Özen; 29 November 1979 (age 46)
- Genres: Pop; Rock
- Occupations: Singer; songwriter; composer; arranger; actor
- Instruments: Guitar; piano; drums; goblet drum
- Years active: 2000–present
- Labels: Şahin Özer; Universal; DMC; Seyhan; Sony
- Website: www.gokhanozen.com.tr

Ahmet Gökhan Özen (born 29 November 1979) is a Turkish singer, songwriter, actor. Also, He is best known for rom-com "Sevda Çiçeği".

== Personal life ==
His family are from Beşikdüzü, Trabzon. On 7 July 2010, he married Selen Sevigen. The couple's first daughter Ada Deren was born in 2012. Another daughter named Derin Su was born in 2015. In November 2016, the couple announced their divorce via a written press release.

In 2005, hairdresser Mehmet Gülsüm was kidnapped and beaten, and Özen was imprisoned for 2 months for inciting the crime.

== Discography ==
=== Albums ===
- 2000: Özelsin
- 2001: Duman Gözlüm
- 2002: Duman Gözlüm remix albüm
- 2003: Civciv
- 2004: Her Şeyde Biraz Sen Varsın (Valentine's Day's special edition)
- 2004: Aslında
- 2005: Kalbim Seninle - One More Time
- 2007: Resimler & Hayaller
- 2008: Bize Aşk Lazım
- 2010: Daha Erken
- 2010: Başka
- 2013: Milyoner
- 2015: Maske
- 2020: Firardayım
- 2021: Firardayım (Deluxe)

=== Music videos ===
- 2000: "Üşüyorum"
- 2001: "Aramazsan Arama"
- 2001: "Tabir-i Caizse"
- 2002: "Dön Çarem"
- 2002: "Ayaz"
- 2003: "Civciv"
- 2003: "Boşver"
- 2004: "Herşeyde Biraz Sen Varsın"
- 2004: "Öyle Büyü Ki Kalbimde"
- 2004: "Sana Yine Muhtacım"
- 2004: "Kader Utansın"
- 2005: "Birtanesisin"
- 2005: "Yaşın Tutmaz"
- 2005: "Benim İçin N'apardın"
- 2005: "Kalbim Seninle"
- 2007: "Tövbeliyim"
- 2007: "Ağlamak Sırayla"
- 2008: "İnkâr Etme"
- 2008: "Vah Vah"
- 2008: "Resimler & Hayaller"
- 2009: "Bize Aşk Lazım"
- 2010: "Daha Erken"
- 2010:"Teslim Al"
- 2011: "Sitemkâr"
- 2011: "Aşk Yorgunu"
- 2011: "Ezdirmem"
- 2013: "Budala"
- 2013: "İki Yeni Yabancı (Remix)"
- 2013: "Ne Farkeder"
- 2014: "Benden Sorulur"
- 2014: "Mis"
- 2016: "Eski Defter (Remix)"
- 2016: "Değişir Dünya"
- 2016: "Korkak"
- 2018: "Yanlış Numara"
- 2020: "Firardayım"
- 2020: "Sana Sorsunlar"
- 2020: "İki Kişi"
- 2021: "Bağrında"
- 2021: "Aslan Kızım"
- 2021: "Bu Maymunlar"
- 2024: "Sağım Solum Aşk"

== Filmography ==
=== Television series ===
Year	Title	Role	Notes
2006	Sevda Çiçeği	Selim	
2007	Selena	Gökhan Özen	Konuk Oyuncu
2007	Yalan Dünya	Saner, Ömer	The songs for this TV series were prepared by Özen.
2011	Yıldız Masalı	Kaya Deren	
