= Kral Turkey Music Awards =

Turkey Music Awards
- Date: 6 March 1995
- Country: Turkey
- Rewards: Music, music video
- First award: 1995
- Final award: 2015
- Website: www.turkiyemuzikodulleri.com

Television/radio coverage
- Network: Kral TV, Star TV

Kral Turkey Music Awards (previously known as Kral TV Video Music Awards between 1995 and 2009, Kral Music Awards between 2009 and 2012, and Turkey Music Awards between 2013 and 2016) were the annual music awards in Turkey. The first awards were given in 1995. Award ceremony was held in Haliç Congress Center in last two years.

== History ==
"Kral TV Video Music Awards" were first awarded in 1995. Until the mid-2000s it is considered one of the most prestigious awards of music in Turkey. After the mid-2000s it lost its popularity. In 2006 new categories announced such as Best poem or Best myth song for such attempt. But they were awarded one year only. In 2007 awards lost their prestige when news emerged about some of the winners changed in favor of some others.

After Kral group has been sold to Doğuş Media Group in 2008, the awards have gone under some refreshments. In 2009, its name was changed to "Kral Music Awards" and 7th Mü-yap Music Awards, IFPI Turkish branch, were given together. Starting from 2009 award categories changed to be more work-based like songs or albums, in the past years awards were mostly artist-specific. Such that 10 awards were awarded for songs or albums in 2013 while only 5 were awarded to artists or groups, In 1995 this was 12 artist/group awards and only 3 song/album awards.

In 2013 the awards changed as "Turkey Music Awards".

== Categories ==
- Best album
- Best song
- Best male artist
- Best female artist
- Best group
- Best music video
- Best project
- Best remix song
- Best new artist
- Best TV series song
- Best film song
- Best duet
- Best instrumental album
- Best single
- Best cover

Special awards:

- Yekta Okur Award
- Jury special award
- Kral TV special award
- Kral FM special award

Past awards:

- In the past, there were categories for female/male artists for genres as Pop, Arabesque, THM, TSM, rock and protest. Now only Female/Male artists are awarded.
- Best lyrics
- Best compose
- Best poem
