= Seyhan Müzik =

Seyhan Müzik is a Turkish record label founded in 1987. Around 2005 they bought up the rights to Sezen Aksu's recordings. Two of Özgün's albums, Elveda and Nöbetçi Aşık, were released through the label.
