= Mü-Yap =

Turkish music industry association

Mü-Yap, (officially Bağlantılı Hak Sahibi Fonogram Yapımcıları Meslek Birliği, Turkish: Turkish Phonographic Industry Society) is the major organization representing the recording industry of Turkey. Mü-Yap is also an IFPI member. As of May 2019, it has 194 members, roughly representing 80% of the Turkish music industry.

== History ==
Mü-Yap was founded in 2000 with Law 5846 of the Turkish constitution. In 2010, Mü-Yap took a role in the closure of Fizy, a popular online streaming service, due to copyright claims. In late 2012, after the iTunes digital music store was opened, many producers pressured Mü-Yap for increased digital rights, in favor of Apple iTunes. This move was considered to be the end of Mü-Yap's monopoly on digital music. In the 2013 general Mü-Yap meeting, Mü-Yap announced their withdrawal from the digital market.

== Records certification ==
Mü-Yap has given certifications to published works as per record sales every year since 2003, as the "Mü-Yap Music Awards". The awards given are Diamond, Platinum and Gold. Additionally, the most downloaded 10 songs of the year are awarded Digital Awards. Additionally, there is a special award named after Turkish producer Yaşar Kekeva.

Years	Gold	Platinum	Diamond
Domestic
2003–2005	N/A	N/A	300,000
2006–	100,000	200,000	300,000
Foreign
2003–2005	N/A	N/A	20,000
2006–	5,000	10,000	20,000

== See also ==
- Turkish music charts
