= Işın Karaca discography =

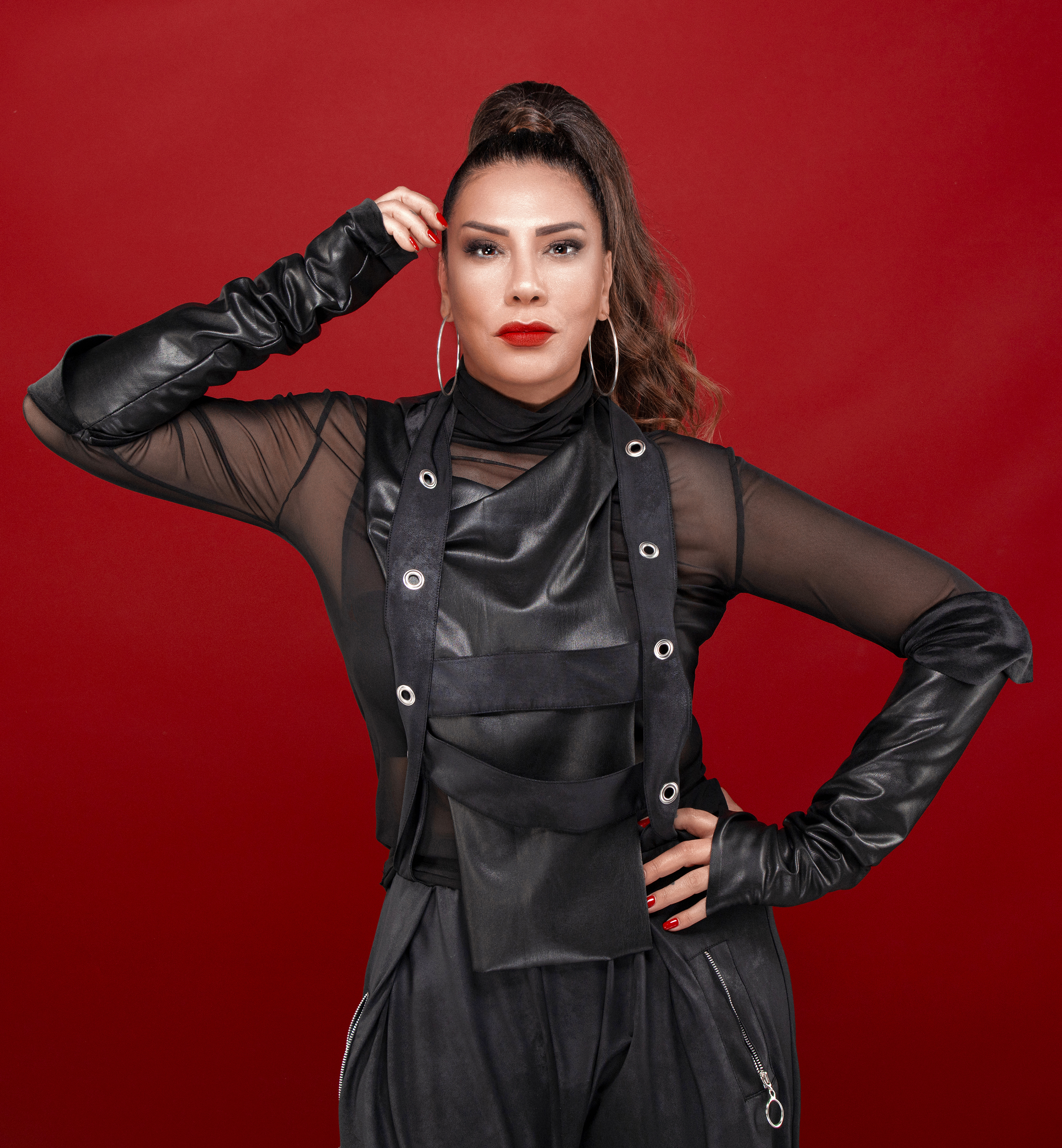
- Karaca, 2020
- Studio albums: 10
- Remix albums: 3
- Singles: 19
- Music videos: 43

This is the discography of Turkish Cypriot pop singer Işın Karaca. She has released ten studio albums, one best of compilation and two remix albums.

== Studio albums ==
Year	Title	Genre	Sales and certificates
2001	Anadilim Aşk: Released: 28 November 2001; Formats: MC, CD, digital download	Turkish Pop	
2004	İçinde Aşk Var: Released: 16 December 2004; Formats: MC, CD	Turkish Pop	
2006	Başka 33/3: Released: 19 June 2006; Formats: MC, CD, digital download	Turkish Pop	
2009	Uyanış: Released: 29 May 2009; Formats: CD	Turkish Pop	
2010	Arabesque: Geçmiş, Geçmemiş Hiç...: Released: 22 April 2010	Arabesque	Turkey sales: 113,000
2011	Arabesque II: Geçmiş Bize Yakışıyor: Released: 7 July 2011; Formats: CD, digital	Arabesque	Turkey sales: 50,000
2013	Her Şey Aşktan: Released: 8 May 2013; Formats: CD, digital	Turkish Pop	
2015	Ey Aşkın Güzel Kızı: Released: 30 January 2015; Formats: CD, digital	Turkish classical	
2017	Eyvallah: Released: 1 December 2017; Formats: Digital	Turkish Pop	
2022	Sen Ben Aşk: Released: 28 March 2022; Formats: Digital	Turkish Pop	

=== Remix albums ===
Year	Title
2023	The Best In Symphonic: Released: 13 October 2023; Format: Digital
2026	Hit vs Hit The Remixes: Released: 23 January 2026; Format: Digital
2026	25. Yıl Özel Hit vs Hit The Remix's Vol II; Released: 26 June 2026; Format: Digital

=== Box sets ===
Album details	Notes
Özel Koleksiyon: Released: 29 March 2013; Label: Seyhan Müzik; Formats: CD	3 CD collection of Anadilim Aşk, Başka 33/3 and Uyanış.

== Singles ==
Year	Single	Release date	Album
2013	Seve Seve	15 April 2013	Her Şey Aşktan
2014	Az Bi Mesafe	4 June 2014	Eyvallah
2016	Güzelim	16 June 2016	Eyvallah
2017	Sevmekten Anladığım (with Sefa Chesmeberah)	20 January 2017	Eyvallah
2017	Çakma	11 July 2017	Eyvallah
2019	Canımın Yarısı	19 March 2019	single only
2020	Geri Gelme	15 January 2020	single only
2020	Alâ (with Demet Akalın, Deniz Seki and Cansu Kurtçu)	24 February 2020	single only
2020	Mevzu Aşksa	20 November 2020	Sen Ben Aşk
2021	Serçe	5 March 2021	Sen Ben Aşk
2021	Bir Yol Var	18 June 2021	Sen Ben Aşk
2023	Helal Değil (with Sefa Chesmeberah)	1 September 2023	single only
2024	Sen Mutlu Ol	19 January 2024	Arabesque III (Note: Unreleased album.)
2024	İhtilal	7 June 2024	single only
2024	Vurgunum (Mermaid version)	16 August 2024	single only
2025	Yanmışsın	17 January 2025	single only
2025	Zor	2 May 2025	single only
2025	Atam (with Fatih Erkoç)	19 May 2025	single only
2025	Dayan Yüreğim	8 August 2025	Kıskandığım Şarkılar
Featured singles
2008	Maxi Single (Ogeday feat. Işın Karaca)	9 January 2008	single only

- Formats are digital download, unless noted otherwise.

== Guest appearances ==
Year	Song	Album
1997	"Kutsal Gerçek I-II-III", "Sıfırdan Oldu", "Söyleyemem", "Bir Yıldız Doğuyor"	Herkül Soundtrack
2000	"Geçmişe Yolculuk" (Fresh B feat. Işın Karaca)	Gerçek Kal
2001	"Kaderimsin"	2001 Eurovision Şarkı Yarışması Türkiye Finali
2002	"Yeni Türkiye"	Yeni Türkiye Coşku Dolu
2003	"Ve Ben Yalnız"	Uluslararası Ödüllü Selmi Andak Şarkıları
2004	"Aynı Cemin Bülbülüyüm"	Neredesin Firuze Soundtrack
2004	"Sen Gittin mi Ben Ölürüm"	O Şarkılar
2004	"Masalcılar Başlıyor", "İyilik Yap Denize At", "Okula Hergün Gitmeli", "Siz Siz Olun", "Taktım Sepeti Koluma"	Masalcılar – 1
2004	"Sessiz Kalma" (with Alpay), "Sessiz Kalma Remix" (with Alpay)	Sessiz Kalma
2006	"Yalnızlığın Adresi" (Mehmet Tokat feat. Işın Karaca)	İnadına Seveceğim
2006	"Yaşasın Okulumuz", "Daha Dün Gibi" (with Burcu Güneş, Yavuz Bingöl, Fatih Erkoç and Özcan Deniz)	Yaşasın Okulumuz
2006	"Ben Sana Vurgunum"	41 Kere Maşallah
2006	"Eski bir Resim" (Ogeday feat. Işın Karaca)	Mecburi İstikamet
2007	"Final Countdown"	Just Feel
2008	"Gel Sende Katıl Umudun Şarkısına" (with Emel Sayın, Nükhet Duru, Orhan Gencebay, Yaşar and TRT İstanbul Çocuk Korosu)	Gel Sende Katıl Umudun Şarkısına
2009	"Samanyolu" (with Emre Kınay)	Mucize Nağmeler: Live 1
2010	"Kırmızı Ruj" (with Berkant)	Her Devrin Devleri
2010	"Eğlen Güzelim" (with Hüseyin Karadayı)	Fashion-U
2011	"Kalbimin Sokağı" (with Ümit Sayın)	Söz-Müzik Ümit Sayın
2012	"Yatıya Gelsin" (Erdem Kınay feat. Işın Karaca)	Proje
2012	"Anlatsam" (Emir Ersoy & Projecto Cubano feat. Işın Karaca)	Karnaval
2013	"Geceyi Sana Yazdım"	Onurlu Yıllar
2014	"Özür Dileme Benden"	Halam Geldi Soundtrack
2014	"Vestiyer" (with Ahmet Selçuk İlkan)	Söz
2014	"Büyük Resim", "Yabancı Oda" (with multiple artists)	Büyük Resim
2015	"Sana Doğru"	Enbe Orkestrası & Behzat Gerçeker
2015	"Hasret Yarası"	"Gelenekten Geleceğe Musa Eroğlu ile Bir Asır"
2015	"Kolay mı"	"Bizim Şarkılar" by Eda-Metin Özülkü
2015	"Zamansız"	Aşkın on Hali
2016	"Elimde Değil" (Harun Kolçak ft. Işın Karaca)	Çeyrek Asır
2017	"Bu Yıl Benim Yeşil Bağım Kurudu"	Mahzuni'ye Saygı
2018	"Dillere Destan"	Yıldız Tilbe'nin Yıldızlı Şarkıları
2020	"Üzme Beni"	Zekai Tunca 50. Yıl Ustaya Saygı
2020	"Petrol"	Attila Özdemiroğlu Besteleri
2023	"Bir Sevgi İstiyorum" (with Emel Şenocak)	Emel Şenocak'tan Yıldızlı Pekiyi
2025	"Ansızın Çektin Gittin" (with Suat Suna)	Hayata Dokunan Melodiler

=== Compilation albums ===
This list shows Işın Karaca songs that are re-used in a compilation album.

Year	Title	Album
2006	"Sen"	Yaşasın Okulumuz
2007	"Bitmemiş Tango"	Saturn in Opposition Soundtrack
2008	"Tutunamadım"	Süper List
2008	"Başka Bahar"	'96 06
2008	"Mandalinalar"	Radyo Klas En İyiler
2009	"Kalbim Ağrıyor"	Power Club Sevgiliye Özel

== Non-album songs ==
- "Meşe Şarkısı" (with Nev, Onur Mete and Yonca Lodi) (Oak Song) – A special song for TEMA (Turkish Foundation for Combating Soil Erosion, for Reforestation and the Protection of Natural Habitats)
- "Sürgün Aşkımız" (1999) – Hazal's song, performed by Karaca in 10th Altın Güvercin Song Contest.
- "Bir Yudum Hayat" (2000) – Performed in 11th Altın Güvercin Song Contest.
- "Bir Kırık Sevda" (2000) – Performed in Turkey pre-eliminations of Eurovision Song Contest
- "Görev Başındayız" (Işın Karaca & Özcan Deniz feat. The Veleds) (2005) – A special song for celebration of 160th year of Police Department of Turkey.
- "Unutama Beni" (2008) – Cover version of Esmeray's hit for ATV's 2008 TV series "Elif" as theme song.
- "Çanakkale Türküsü" (with 16 other singers) (2013) – A special song for 98th anniversary of Gallipoli Memorial Day.

== Music videos ==
Year	Song	Album	Director
2001	"Tutunamadım"	Anadilim Aşk	Kıvanç Baruönü
2002	"Başka Bahar"	Anadilim Aşk	Kıvanç Baruönü
2003	"Aramıza Yollar"	Anadilim Aşk	Waleed Nassif
2004	"Sen Gitttin mi Ben Ölürüm"	O Şarkılar	
2004	"Sessiz Kalma"	Sessiz Kalma	Biray Dalkıran
2004	"Sessiz Kalma Remix"	Sessiz Kalma	Biray Dalkıran
2004	"Yetinmeyi Bilir misin?"	İçinde Aşk Var	Altan Dönmez
2005	"Bekleyelim de Görelim"	İçinde Aşk Var	
2005	"Hoşgörü"	İçinde Aşk Var	Korhan Bozkurt
2005	"Görev Başındayız"		Oğuzhan Tercan
2006	"Mandalinalar"	Başka 33/3	Kubilay Kasap
2006	"Kalp Tanrıya Emanet"	Başka 33/3	Kubilay Kasap
2007	"Bırakma"	Başka 33/3	Kubilay Kasap
2009	"Bilmece"	Uyanış	Erol Yılmaz
2010	"Uyanış"	Uyanış	Sedat Doğan & Cem Başeskioğlu
2010	"Kırmızı Ruj" (with Berkant)	Her Devrin Devleri	Eyüp Dirlik
2010	"Dert Bende Derman Sende"	Arabesque	Sedat Doğan
2010	"Mavi Mavi"	Arabesque	Sedat Doğan
2010	"Hor Görme Garibi"	Arabesque	Sedat Doğan
2010	"Eğlen Güzelim" (with Hüseyin Karadayı)	Fashion-U	Sedat Doğan
2011	"Tanrım"	Arabesque II	Sedat Doğan
2012	"Ben İnsan Değil miyim"	Arabesque II	Kemal Başbuğ
2012	"Anlatsam" (Emir Ersoy & Projecto Cubano feat. Işın Karaca)	Karnaval	
2013	"Seve Seve"	Her Şey Aşktan	Kemal Başbuğ
2013	"Helal Olsun"	Her Şey Aşktan	Kemal Başbuğ
2014	"Az Bi Mesafe"	Eyvallah	Kemal Başbuğ
2015	"Bir Garip Yolcu (Yalan Dünya)"	Ey Aşkın Güzel Kızı	Deniz Akel
2016	"Güzelim"	Eyvallah	
2017	"Sevmekten Anladığım" (with Sefa Chesmeberah)	Eyvallah	
2017	"Çakma"	Eyvallah	
2017	"Bize De Bu Yakışır"	Eyvallah	
2018	"Eyvallah"	Eyvallah	
2019	"Canımın Yarısı"	Non-album single	Halil Güzel & Fatih Tetik
2020	"Geri Gelme"	Non-album single	Ferhat M Zupčević
2020	"Alâ" (with Demet Akalın, Cansu Kurtçu & Deniz Seki)	Non-album single	Metin Arolat
2020	"Mevzu Bu Mu"	Sen Ben Aşk	Cem Bayoğlu
2020	"Nazarlardanmış"	Sen Ben Aşk	Cem Bayoğlu
2021	"Serçe"	Sen Ben Aşk	Korhan Üstün & Işın Karaca
2021	"Bir Yol Var"	Sen Ben Aşk	Adil Yirmibeş
2022	"Rest"	Sen Ben Aşk	Köksal Kaya
2022	"Gurbetlik"	Sen Ben Aşk	Köksal Kaya
2022	"Bu Gece"	Sen Ben Aşk	Köksal Kaya
2024	"Sen Mutlu Ol"	Arabesque III	Kemal Başbuğ
