= Işın Show =

- Presented by: Işın Karaca
- Country of origin: Turkey
- Original language: Turkish
- No. of seasons: 1
- No. of episodes: 7

Original release
- Network: atv
- Release: 8 July – 19 August 2005

Işın Show was a short-lived talk show which aired on atv in 2005. The show was hosted by Turkish pop singer Işın Karaca.

The show hosted famous Turkish singers such as Yıldız Tilbe, Ebru Gündeş, Özlem Tekin and İzel. There were small skits throughout the show with names such as "Börül Abla" or "Barbi bebekler". DJ Çığırtkan also featured in the show with announcements and skits.

The show used Işınla Beni (Turkish: Teleport me, a pun with her name Işın which means "light" in Turkish) in the promotions before the original air.

== Episode list ==
#	Air date	Guests
1	8 July 2005	İzel, Engin Günaydın, Barış Akarsu, İbrahim Kutluay, Demet Şener
2	15 July 2005	Sefarad, Ebru Destan, Berdan Mardini
3	22 July 2005	Ebru Gündeş, "Banyo" film cast: Demet Evgar, Arda Kural, Sermiyan Midyat
4	29 July 2005	Vatan Şaşmaz, Asuman Krause, Yıldız Tilbe
5	5 August 2005	Asena, Özlem Tekin, Halit Ergenç
6	12 August 2005	Semih Saygıner, Behzat Uygur
7	19 August 2005	Burhan Öçal, Doğa Rutkay, Uğur Uludağ, Zeynep Casalini
