= Şevval =

Şevval (Turkish pronunciation: [ʃevˈvaɫ]) is a given name. Notable people with the name include:

- Şevval Alpavut (born 1998), Turkish footballer
- Şevval İlayda Tarhan (born 2000), Turkish sports shooter
- Şevval Sam (born 1973), Turkish singer and actress
- Yonca Şevval Erdem (born 1996), Turkish water polo player
