= Yonca =

- Gender: Feminine
- Language: Turkish

Origin
- Meaning: Clover

Yonca is a common feminine Turkish given name. In Turkish, "Yonca" means "clover". Notable people with the name include:

== Given name ==
- Yonca Şevval Erdem (born 1996), Turkish water polo player
- Yonca Evcimik (born 1963), Turkish pop singer
- Yonca Lodi (born 1974), Turkish pop music singer
