= Işın Karaca =

Turkish Cypriot singer (born 1973)

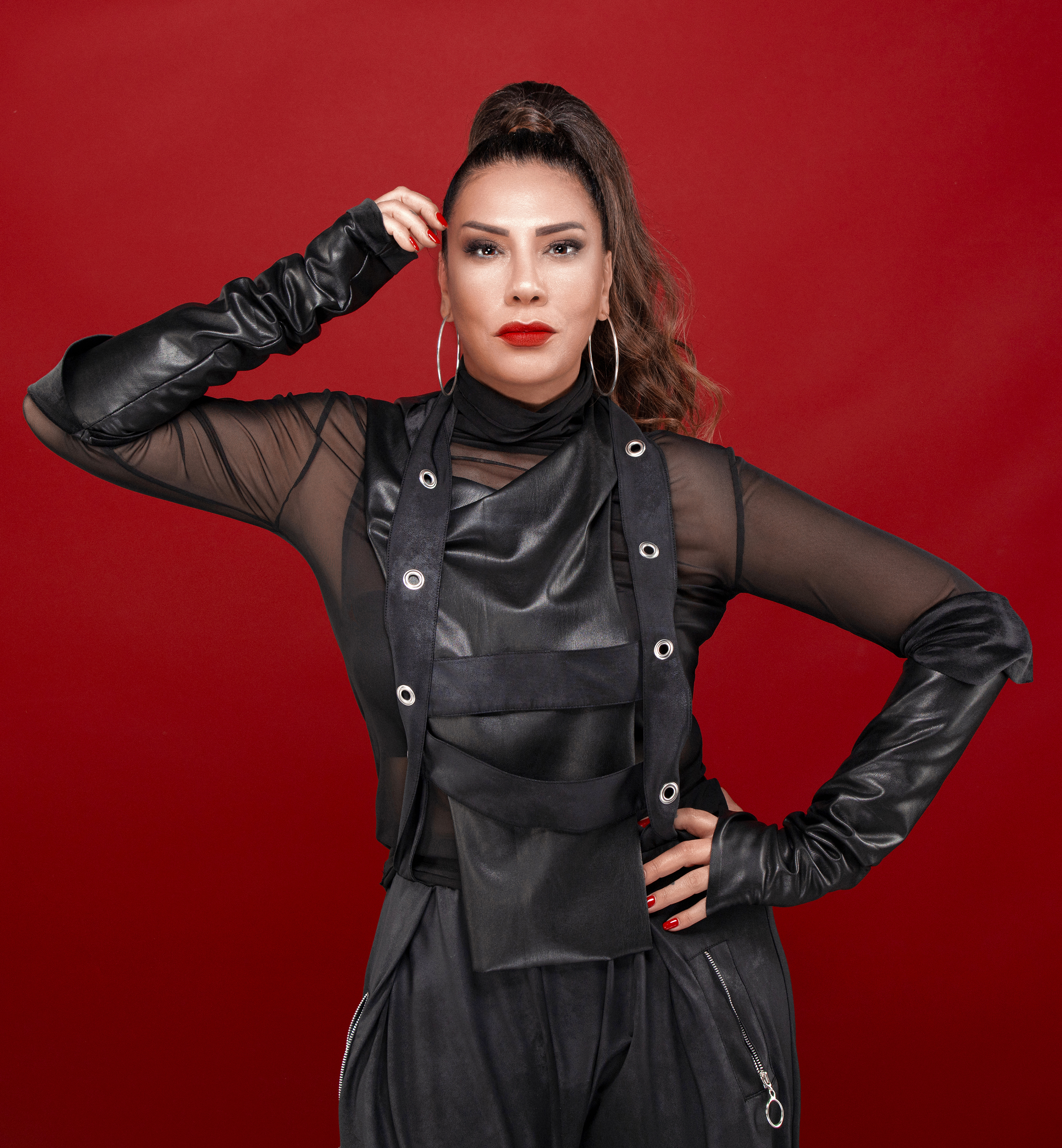
- Karaca in 2020
- Born: Işın Funda Büyükkaraca; 7 March 1973 (age 53); London, England
- Occupations: Singer; actress
- Years active: 2001–present
- Spouses: Soner Kıvanç (divorced) Sedat Doğan (m. 2011; div. 2013) Tuğrul Odabaş (m. 2016; div. 2019) Can Yapıcıoğlu (m. 2023)
- Partner: Erdem Yörük (1996–2008)
- Children: 2
- Musical career
- Genre: Pop
- Instrument: Vocals
- Labels: Avrupa; Seyhan; İmaj; Power; PDND; Akış
- Website: www.isinkaraca.com

Işın Funda Büyükkaraca (born 7 March 1973), better known as Işın Karaca (Turkish pronunciation: [ɯˈʃɯn kaɾaˈdʒa]), is a Turkish Cypriot singer.

== Personal life ==
Işın Funda Büyükkaraca was born into a Turkish Cypriot family which had emigrated to the United Kingdom. Her mother Şeniz Büyükkaraca, a restaurant owner in Cyprus and her father Ali Büyükkaraca (died 2011) was a real estate agent originally from Afyon, Turkey. She graduated from the London IV King Edward School with a theatre major.

Karaca has a son (Erda Kıvanç, born 1993) from her first husband Soner Kıvanç, whom she later divorced. She had an affair for 12 years with arranger-composer Erdem Yörük. Karaca married director and motocross racer Sedat Doğan on 30 May 2011. She gave birth to her daughter Sasha Mia in 2011. The couple divorced two years later in November 2013. On 29 December 2016, she married Tuğrul Odabaş. In 2017 and 2019, her ex-husband Sedat Doğan was arrested in Brazil after being caught for stealing. In April 2019, it was revealed that Karaca was paying a ₺1 million debt left by Sedat Doğan. Earlier, she had changed her daughter's family name from Doğan to Büyükkaraca via a court decision. On 6 November 2019, Karaca and her third husband Tuğrul Odabaş divorced. In December 2019, she started dating musician Can Yapıcıoğlu.

In July 2023, Karaca announced that she had been diagnosed with alopecia universalis. On 27 October 2023, she married musician Can Yapıcıoğlu.

On 11 April 2026, Karaca said that she had been denied entry to Greece upon arrival in Athens and returned to Turkey. She linked the decision to criticism over her 2024 concert in Komotini, where she had performed the İzmir March, a song celebrating the Turkish capture of Smyrna (which was followed by the Burning of Smyrna by Turkish officers four days later and the eradication of Greek and Armenian population) and the slogan "Ne mutlu Türküm diyene". Greek media had criticised the performance and in the official deportation statements she received according to herself states her 2024 performance.

== Music career ==
=== Backing vocalist and rise to fame (1997–2004) ===
Işın began her musical career as vocalist for Sezen Aksu. In 1997, she performed songs in the Turkish translation of Disney's Hercules' Soundtrack. She also performed the Turkish translations of this album. In 1999 she became the lead vocalist of the musical group "Panic Attack", but the group separated before releasing any albums. In 2000 she competed for Turkey on Eurovision Song Contest's pre-eliminations with "Bir Kırık Sevda". She didn't pass pre-eliminations for Eurovision but she represented Turkey in the OGAE Second Chance Contest and became 7th with 104 points. One year later she tried again with "Kaderimsin", but again she wasn't selected to represent Turkey for Eurovision. In OGAE Second Chance Contest, "Kaderimsin" became 14th with 52 points. She also appeared in Sezen Aksu's music videos "Oh oh" and "Allahın Varsa". In 2000, she was featured in "Geçmişe Yolculuk" from Fresh B.'s "Gerçek Kal" album. Until 2001 she continued working as back vocalist of Sezen Aksu. She also modeled for the XL fashion company "Sumak"'s Fall-Winter catalog in 2004–2005. She and her brother Akın Büyükkaraca own a musical production company: Akış Production.

In November 2009, she modeled for Adil Işık's 2009–2010 Fall-Winter catalogue "Love My Body" collection. The photoshoot was shot by famous Turkish photographer Serkan Şedele.

As she got her fame by working with Sezen Aksu as her backing vocalist, she released her debut album, Anadilim Aşk (My Native Language is Love), with help of her. The album is released in 2001 under "Power Records" label. All of the songs on this album were written by Sezen Aksu, except two of them have lyrics written by Ali İlyas. She made a great success with this album, becoming popular all over Turkey. Her first single Tutunamadım and second single Başka Bahar became hits. The video for the third single "Aramıza Yollar" was shot by Waleed Nassif. This video was the first High Definition video in Turkey. Famous Turkish actor Toprak Sergen also appears in this video. There's a video shot for "Doğum Günün Kutlu Olsun Oğlum", but this video was never aired due to conflicts with her music company. First release of this album sold-out quickly and they re-released with an addition of "Tutunamadım (remix)" in 2001. This version also sold-out quickly, and in 2006 it was re-released with "Seyhan Müzik" label. After the first album was released, she contributed to several albums like Selmi Andak's "Uluslararası Ödüllü Selmi Andak Şarkıları", Hakkı Yalçın's "O Şarkılar", Alpay's "Sessiz Kalma" and collection of "Yeni Türkiye Coşku Dolu". She performed a song in soundtrack album of Ezel Akay's movie Where's Firuze?. She also starred in this movie as guest star. In 2004 she formed a group named "Masalcılar [Storytellers]" with Erdem Yörük, Eda Özülkü and Metin Özülkü. They made their first album called "Masalcılar I" in which they tell stories to children. The group intended to make a series of albums like this and they credited this inside the cover of the album, but they never released another project.

In 2004, she released her second album, İçinde Aşk Var (There's Love Inside). She worked with different writers like Aysel Gürel, Suat Suna, Ümit Sayın. She also wrote a song in this album. This album has only one song written by Sezen Aksu. First video Yetinmeyi Bilir misin? becomes a hit. Second video "Bekleyelim de Görelim" also made a great success. The last video came to a Sezen Aksu cover "Hoşgörü".

In 2006 she contributed in Mehmet Tokat's poetry album İnadına Seveceğim. Then she performed "Ben Sana Vurgunum" for Ali Kocatepe's tribute album 41 Kere Maşallah which was a celebration of Ali Kocatepe's 41st year as an artist. She performed "Eski Bir Resim" in rap-singer Ogeday's album Mecburi İstikamet. She also contributed in charity album Yaşasın Okulumuz which aims to make schools or improve the conditions of them, mostly in sub-urban areas.

=== Başka, Uyanış and Arabesque albums (2006–11) ===
In 2006 she released her third solo album, 33/3 Başka (Different). She worked with Alper Narman and Fettah Can on this album. She wrote a song for this album too. There are no Sezen Aksu songs in this album. First video Mandalinalar became a hit. Second video came out for "Kalp Tanrıya Emanet". The third video became "Bırakma".

In 2007 she performed "The Final Countdown" in Dolapdere Big Gang's Just Feel. This was the first song performed in English by Işın Karaca in an official recording.

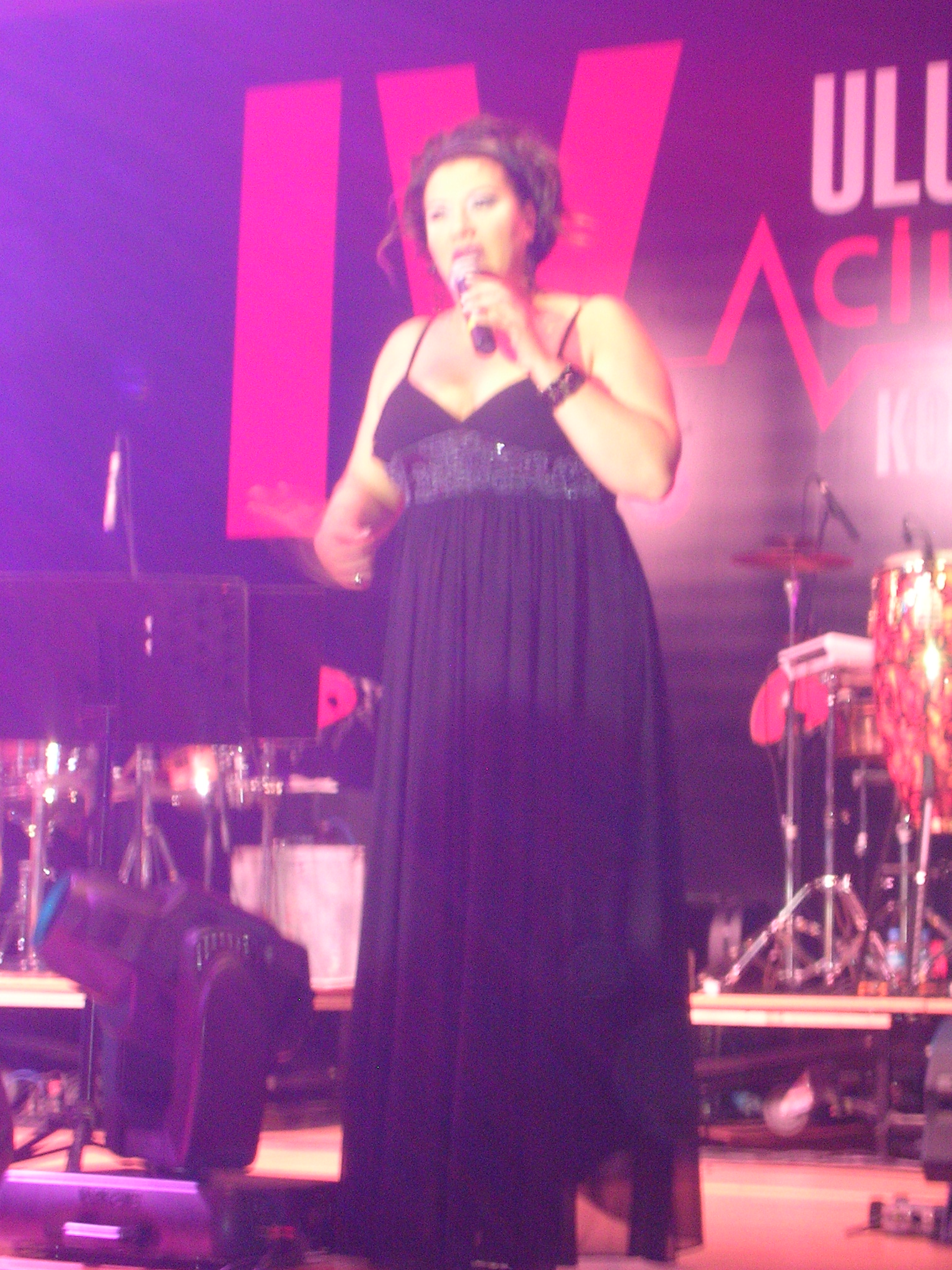
Karaca in Antalya, May 2008

In 2008 she was featured in Ogeday's Maxi Single. They performed "Eski Bir Resim" in RnB, electribe, house, Reggaeton and electronic style. In June 2008, she performed a cover of Esmeray's hit "Unutama Beni" for the theme song of ATV's "Elif" TV series.

Işın Karaca's fourth studio album, Uyanış, was released on 29 May 2009. She worked with Sibel Alaş, Erdem Yörük, Erol Temizel and Zeki Güner on the album. She is also a songwriter for several songs in the album.

In April 2010, she released her first arabesque album: Arabesque, which included covers of famous arabesque songs. The album was released when Arabesque music gained popularity among Turkish pop music singers. The album has sold more than 100,000 copies, which is more than her pop albums. This lead her to release the sequel album in June 2011: Arabesque II. The sequel album also become successful, which has sold more than 50.000 copies.

=== Return to pop music and Classical Turkish music project (2013–present) ===
In 2012, she announced the title of her pop album Her Şey Aşktan (English: Everything is because of love) from her Twitter account. The album was released on 8 May 2013.

In 2013, she performed "Geceyi Sana Yazdım" in "Onurlu Yıllar" album, which is a tribute album for Onur Akın in his 25th anniversary in music industry. On 18 March 2013, she and 16 other singers sang "Çanakkale Türküsü", a special song for 98th anniversary of Gallipoli Memorial Day. In May 2014, she performed "Vestiyer" in Ahmet Selçuk İlkan's duets album Söz.

On 30 January 2015, she has released her first Turkish classical music album, "Ey Aşkın Güzel Kızı" (English: Beautiful daughter of love). The first video was "Bir Garip Yolcu (Yalan Dünya)" released on 13 February 2015. In February 2015, she took part in Deniz Seki's "Hayat 2 Bilet" (English: Life is two tickets) video, which was shot with Seki's friends while she was imprisoned. In May 2015, she sang "Hasret Yarası" in Musa Eroğlu's tribute album "Gelenekten Geleceğe Musa Eroğlu ile Bir Asır". In June 2015, she sang "Kolay mı" in Eda-Metin Özülkü's "Bizim Şarkılar" album.

In 2017, she released her sixth pop music album Eyvallah, which was released in December 2017. First single from the album, "Güzelim", was released on 10 June 2016.

== Other fields ==
=== Acting career ===
She had a leading role in a movie called "Sen Ne Dilersen" (International English title:Whatever You Wish) directed by Cem Başeskioğlu. She starred with Işık Yenersu, Zeynep Eronat, Yıldız Kenter and Fikret Kuşkan. Her performance of a mentally challenged girl "Marika" is praised although it's her first full-length acting.

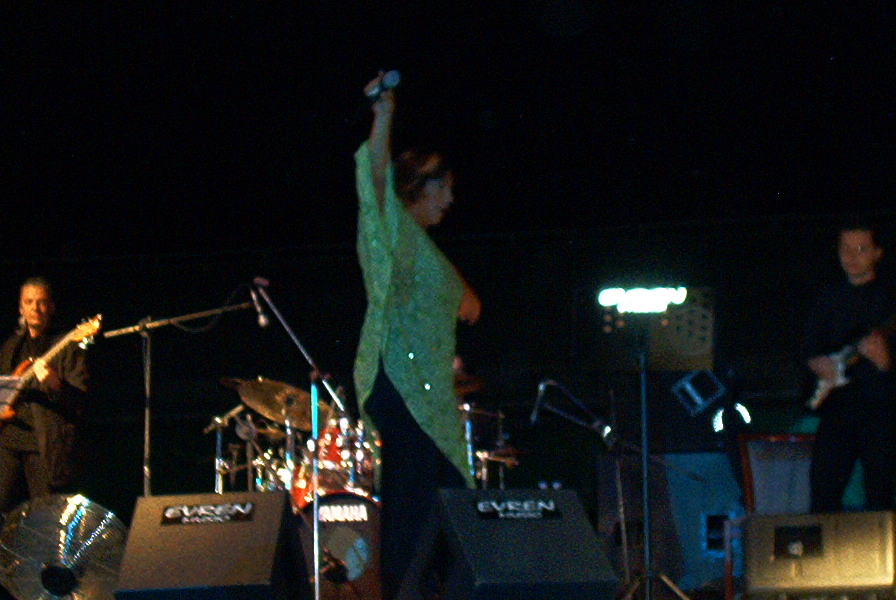
Işın Karaca at concert in Ankara, 2005

She was to act in "Herşeyin Bittiği Yerden" directed by Turkish film director and actor Ezel Akay, where she co-starred with Okan Bayülgen. The movie is about 1999 İzmit earthquake. The film was scheduled to be released in January 2009, however it was cancelled due to financial problems.

==== Television ====
In 2005 she hosted a musical program called "Işın Show" in channel ATV. In the show she hosted several popular Turkish singers and actors every week. The program ended on 19 August 2005. She appeared in Turkish TV series Haziran Gecesi as a guest singer.

In 2007 she and Vatan Şaşmaz hosted "Kadın Her Yaşta Güzeldir" which was a beauty contest between mothers. In 2007 she also became the musical coach of Vatan Şaşmaz in first season of "Şarkı Söylemek Lazım", in which popular non-singer celebrities sing songs for the show. They became very successful that they come 4th out of 12 contestants. In mid-2007 she hosted a musical show "Haydi Söyle" in channel Turkmax.

In 2009, she appeared as a guest actress in Turkish adaption of The Golden Girls, Altın Kızlar, with her role Nurse Binnaz.

On 18 September 2012, she started hosting "Başucu Şarkıları" in TRT Müzik channel.

=== Authorship ===
As of 2 March 2005 she was writing a blog named "Kaleminden" (From her pen) on her official website, that is mainly about news of her works but occasionally contains her point of view on daily events. The articles sometimes concern about global awarenesses or national problems with a wide range of interests from politics to music industry. She currently had written 66 articles.

In 2005 she announced that she was writing a book. Later she told that it is a diet book named "Büyümek İçin Küçülmek Lazım" (Need to get smaller to grow) and will be published when she is 36 in size. The book is about her memories while losing weight, and there will be also tips about diet recipes.

In 2008 she became columnist of 2kadin.com website and has been writing since 18 June 2008. Her columns are about relationships, and her target audience is women.

=== Fashion design ===
In May 2016, she announced her "2016 Fall-Winter" fashion catalog to be released in September 2016. She said, she had designed clothes mainly aimed at plus-sized people.

== Philanthropy ==
In 2005, she rebuilt the library of "Gölcük Kız Meslek High School" which was damaged in 1999 İzmit earthquake. On 3 July 2005 she gave a charity concert and donated the income to the school. On 19 April 2006 she opened the library, which was named after her.

In 2006 she contributed in Yaşasın Okulumuz project, which aims to make schools or improve the conditions of them, mostly in sub-urban areas. She sang the theme song with other artists and gave one of her songs "Sen" to be included in the album made for the project. She also joined the charity night aired on Show TV, where she and other voluntary artists answered calls for donations.

In April 2008, she contributed in charity album "Gel Sende Katıl Umudun Şarkısına" (Come, join the song of hope), a song made for "KACUV" (Foundation of Hope for Kids with Cancer). This project aims to build hygienic houses to be used for treatment of kids who had cancer.

In 2009, she and Sedat Doğan started a project named "Doğudan Doğan Işık" (The light that sets from east). It is an exhibition, which aims renewal of village schools in Turkey. They started their first photoshoot in Mardin.

== Discography ==
=== Albums ===
1. Anadilim Aşk [My Native Language is Love] (28 November 2001)
2. İçinde Aşk Var [There's Love Inside] (16 December 2004)
3. Başka 33/3 [Different] (19 June 2006)
4. Uyanış [Awakening] (29 May 2009)
5. Arabesque: Geçmiş, Geçmemiş Hiç... [Arabesque: Past, has never passed...] (22 April 2010)
6. Arabesque II: Geçmiş Bize Yakışıyor [Arabesque II: Past suits us] (June 2011)
7. Her Şey Aşktan [Everything is because of love] (8 May 2013)
8. Ey Aşkın Güzel Kızı [Beautiful daughter of love] (30 January 2015)
9. Eyvallah (1 December 2017)
10. Sen Ben Aşk [You Me Love] (28 March 2022)
11. The Best In Symphonic (13 October 2023)

== Filmography ==
Year	Title	Role	Notes	Format
2004	Where's Firuze? (Turkish: Neredesin Firuze)	herself	Guest singer	Film
2005	Sen Ne Dilersen (int. title: Whatever You Wish)	Marika	First movie	Film
2005	Işın Show	Host	Musical show, aired for 7 episodes	TV show
2005	Haziran Gecesi	herself	17th episode, guest singer	TV series
2007	Kadın Her Yaşta Güzeldir	Co-host	with Vatan Şaşmaz	TV show
2007	Şarkı Söylemek Lazım	Contestant	Vocal coach of Vatan Şaşmaz, who placed fourth.	TV show
2007	Haydi Söyle	Host	Musical contest	TV show
2009	Altın Kızlar	Nurse Binnaz	4th episode, guest actress in Turkish adaption of The Golden Girls	TV series
2010	Gelecekten Bir Gün	Filiz	Guest actress	Film
2010	Melahat'in Son Akşam Yemeği	Melahat	Unreleased short film by Cem Başeskioğlu	Short film
2012-2015	Başucu Şarkıları	Host	Musical show in TRT Müzik	TV show

== Awards and nominations ==
Year	Contest	Category	result
1999	Altın Güvercin Music Contest	Best Performer	Won
2000	Altın Güvercin Music Contest	Best Performer	Won
2002	Kral TV Video Music Awards	Best New Female Artist	Nominated
2005	Kral TV Video Music Awards	Best Pop Female Artist	Nominated
2006	İstanbul Fm Gold Awards Ceremony	Best Pop Female Artist	Won
2010	İstanbul Fm Gold Awards Ceremony	Best concept album (Female) for "Arabesque"	Won
2011	Kral Music Awards	Best project for "Arabesque"	Nominated
2012	Kral Music Awards	Best project for "Arabesque II"	Nominated

== See also ==
- Music of Turkey
- Turkish pop music
