= Her Şey Aşktan =

Studio album by Işın Karaca
- Released: 8 May 2013
- Genre: Pop, R&B
- Label: Seyhan Müzik

Işın Karaca chronology
Arabesque II (2011)	Her Şey Aşktan (2013)	Ey Aşkın Güzel Kızı (2015)

Singles from Her Şey Aşktan
- 1. "Seve Seve" Released: 16 April 2013; 2. "Helal Olsun" Released: 23 September 2013

Her Şey Aşktan (or Herşey Aşktan with alternative spelling) (Turkish: Everything from love), is Işın Karaca's seventh studio album, released on 8 May 2013. This is her first pop album since Uyanış, which was released in 2009. She revealed the track listing on 29 March 2013 from her official Instagram account. She worked with Cansu, Fettah Can, Sefa Cheshmberah, Zeynep Talu, Selim Çaldıran, Elif Nün İçelli, Bora Duran and Zeki Güner for this album. She promoted the album during her "Başucu Şarkıları" talk show broadcast on 16 April 2013. During the show she revealed that the song "Herşey Aşktan" was previously titled as "Günaydın".

== Singles ==
The first single "Seve Seve" released to radios and made available for digital download on April 16, 2013. This is the first digital single released in her career. The music video for Seve Seve was shot by Kemal Başbuğ on 1 May 2013, aired on 9 May 2013. The video was shot in a parking area closed to traffic. In the video, she portrayed a car driver, where she constantly makes accidents due to her anger. At the end of the video, her anger ceases and she stops the car. The video resembles Skunk Anansie's 2010 video "My Ugly Boy" directed by Paul Street.

The second video is shot for "Helal Olsun" on 16 September 2013. The video is directed by Kemal Başbuğ. The teaser was released on 20 September and the official video was released on 23 September. It is loosely continuation of her previous video "Seve Seve".

== Track listing ==
#	Title	Translation	Written by	Duration
1	"Seve Seve"	By loving	Elif Nün İçelli	3:38
2	"Zaman"	Time	Elif Nün İçelli	4:04
3	"Helal Olsun"	Well done	Bora Duran	3:50
4	"Adresler Değişti"	Addresses changed	Cansu	3:06
5	"Vurgunum"	I'm struck	Sefa Cheshmberah	3:19
6	"Her Şey Aşktan"	Everything from love	Cansu, Fettah Can	4:06
7	"Yalnızlık"	Loneliness	Sefa Cheshmberah	4:10
8	"Gurur"	Pride	Sefa Cheshmberah	3:40
9	"Zafer Bende"	I'm victorious	Sefa Cheshmberah, Selim Çaldıran	3:53
10	"Hiç Haberin Yok!"	You're unaware	Sefa Cheshmberah	3:43
11	"Helal Olsun (Dub mix)"	Well done		3:43

== Music videos ==
- "Seve Seve" in YouTube
