= Tokyo Override =

2024 Japanese original net animation series

- Promotional poster; featuring the main protagonist Kai Koguma
- Created by: Dai Sato
- Original net animation
- Directed by: Yusuke Fukada; Veerapatra Jinanavin
- Produced by: Yusuke Fukada; Veerapatra Jinanavin
- Written by: Isao Murayama
- Music by: Kenji Katoh
- Studio: Riff Studio
- Licensed by: Netflix
- Released: November 21, 2024
- Runtime: 24–28 minutes
- Episodes: 6

Tokyo Override is a Japanese original net animated (ONA) series produced by Netflix. Directed and produced by Yusuke Fukada and Veerapatra Jinanavin, the series premiered on Netflix in November 2024. Motorcycle manufacturers Yamaha and Honda were involved throughout the show's 3.5 year production. This included the show's worldbuilding phase, which was led by world designer Laura Cechanowicz, who brought in Joshua Dawson to serve as world-building architect.

== Plot ==
Set in a near-future and technologically optimized Tokyo. The story follows Kai, a lonely young hacker whose life changes when she becomes involved with Suma Garage, a group of underground couriers who carry out deliveries for people in need. Through their work, Kai is drawn into parts of the city hidden beneath its orderly surface, where drugs, crime, and corruption continue to operate despite the city's polished image. As Kai and the couriers investigate further, they uncover signs of a larger conspiracy and work to expose the truth behind Tokyo's supposedly perfect system.

== Characters ==
Kai Koguma
Voiced by: Ai Fairouz (Japanese); Maya Aoki Tuttle (English)
A young hacker living in the West District.
Hugo
Voiced by: Ryota Takeuchi (Japanese); Talon Warburton (English)
A courier working for Suma Garage.
Spoke
Voiced by: Tomoaki Maeno (Japanese); Kaiji Tang (English)
A courier working for Suma Garage.
Watari
Voiced by: Mariya Ise (Japanese); Shelby Young (English)
A hacker working for Suma Garage.
Yukio
Voiced by: Shigeru Chiba (Japanese); Keythe Farley (English)
Ayumi
Voiced by: Yu Serizawa (Japanese); Lisa Kay Jennings (English)
Yoshiaki Kageyama
Voiced by: Hochu Otsuka (Japanese); Kiff VandenHeuvel (English)
A former police detective turned narcotics investigator working for the Ministry of Health Department.
Yasumoto
Voiced by: Miyu Irino (Japanese); Clifford Chapin (English)
An investigator working under Kageyama
Ieuji
Voiced by: Yuhko Kaida (Japanese); Erica Lindbeck (English)
Amarin Lu
Voiced by: Sayaka Senbongi (Japanese); Aryn Rozelle (English)
Mikuriya
Voiced by: Yutaka Aoyama (Japanese); Feodor Chin (English)

== Release ==
The series was released on Netflix on November 21, 2024, with six episodes. The ending theme is "Tokyo Minority" by Yu Serizawa. An insert song, "Cryptogram" by Yu Serizawa, Melody Chubak and Yonca was also used on the fourth episode.
