= Jennifer Şebnem Schaefer =

Turkish-German fashion model, actress and TV presenter

Şebnem Schäfer
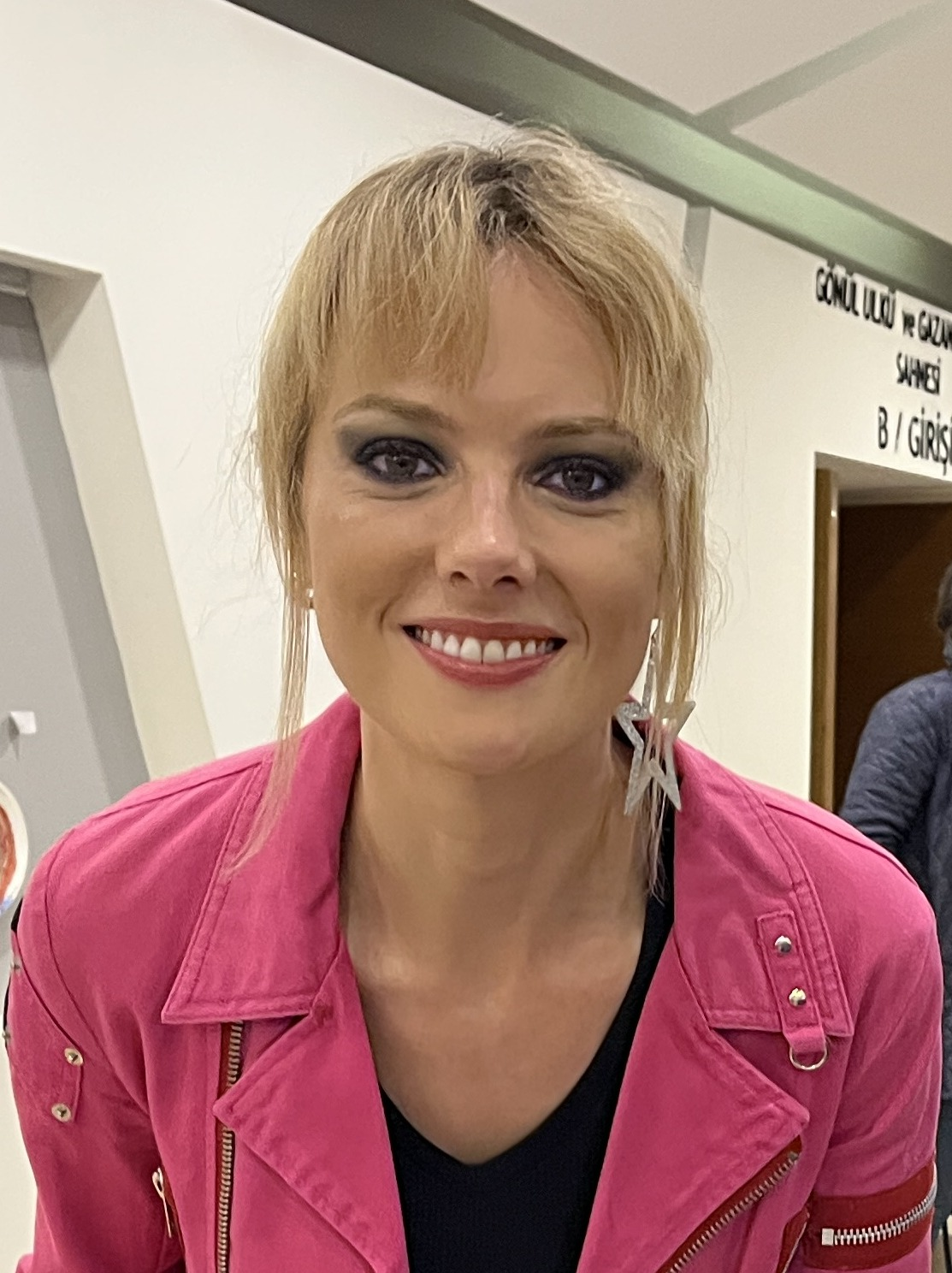
- Born: Jennifer Simone Macide Şebnem Schäfer; 9 February 1984 (age 42); Frankfurt, West Germany
- Years active: 1999–present
- Modeling information
- Height: 181 cm (5 ft 11 in)
- Hair color: Blond
- Eye color: Hazel
- Website: www.jennifersebnem.com

Jennifer Simone Macide Şebnem Schaefer (known in Turkey as Şebnem Schaefer and in Germany as Jennifer Schäfer; born 9 February 1984) is a Turkish-German fashion model, actress and TV presenter.

== Career ==
Jennifer Şebnem Schäfer was discovered in the year 2000 when she went to Turkey for a holiday. She became known with the quiz show she presented Size Milyarlar Sunuyoruz (We Offer You Billions - SMS). Then, she attended the contest "Ford Models Super Model of the World" and came out on the top. In 2001, she presented Turkey at the "Super Model of the World" competition in Miami Beach. During this period, many agencies from Milan offered to work with her. At the same period of time she was the only Turkish model who Zeki Triko worked with for its swimsuits catalogue shoots.

With Arda Kural, he starred in popular youth series Lise Defteri and in popular military comedy series Emret Komutanım for twice times.

In 2002, she performed fashion shows in cities like San Francisco and Santo Domingo for the fashion department of Acun Firarda.

She appeared on the cover of many national and international magazines, including FHM, Esquire, Cosmopolitan, Formsanté, Şamdan, Aktüel, Gala, Tempo, Hafta Sonu, Bride, Vizon, InCity, DSmart, Ray Gurme, Artılife, Trtuning, Secret, Haftalık, Dolce, Kapris, Tele Magazin, Süxé, Alanyum, Nisan, HaberHayat, Elegance, Wiesbadener, etc.

In 2007, she took part in Show TV's ice skating dance competition, called Buzda Dans, alongside other rivals.

Schaefer later presented a number of programs in both Turkey and Germany. She made great success with Muhteşem Çocuklar on TV8.

She joined the Democrat Party in 2007 and in 2009 was nominated as a member of Şişli Municipality Council. Şhe graduated from the Public Administration Department of Politics in Fernuniversität in Hagen, with the goal to become an ambassador between Turkey and Germany, and work on social projects. In 2010, she met the then-German President Christian Wulff in Ankara after which she was chosen as the "Turkey-Germany We're together Project" campaign. After this meeting, Christian Wulff offered Schaefer to work in Germany. She was also an active member of the Executive Committee of the Women's Branch of the Christian Democratic Union of Germany (CDU) in Frankfurt. Schaefer is one of the founders of the Limburg branch of the Atatürkist Thought Association, of which she has been a member since the age of 11.

Mustafa Arıkoğlu, Ahmet Çevik, and Şebnem Schaefer (center) at the 2018 Türkiye Golden Palm Awards ceremony.

Schaefer, who had been establishing a career in both Germany and Turkey, went on a hiatus for a number of years. In 2016, she took part in the Masal Uydurma Workshop for children. In June 2017, together with Prof. Dr. Orhan Kural, she started presenting the program Lütfen+1 Çevre on BloombergHT.

== Achievements ==
- 1995: Europe's most beautiful Turkish girl.
- 1999: Face of PRO 7 Arabella
- 2000: Miss Teen Tourism World
- 2001: Ford Models Super Model of the World
- 2002: Star Search Germany
- 2005: Miss Bad Kreuznach
- 2005: Miss Rheinland-Pfalz
- 2006: Miss Germany

Other Achievements

- In 2002 she was selected as the Turk having the most beautiful parts of the human body by the votes of Sabah (a daily newspaper) and Bir Numara Yayıncılık's (Number One Broadcasting) employees, the men in the street and e-groups for weekly magazine Aktuel.
- In 2004 she was chosen by FHM journal as Europe's most beautiful Turkish model.
- In 2005, together with Çağla Kubat, she became the most beautiful girl of Turkey with the votes of thirteen plastic surgeons for weekly journal Tempo.
- In 2005-2008-2010 she took her place among the sexiest women list of the world with the votes of FHM journal's readers.
- In 2009 the readers of magazine Askmen chose her as one of the top ten sexiest Turkish women.
- In 2011 she had a good place among top 50 sexiest German women by the magazine Complex, based on the reader's decisions.

== Filmography ==
=== Cinema and TV films ===
Cinema and TV films
| Year | Title | Role | Notes |
|---|---|---|---|
| 2002 | O Şimdi Asker | Woman in Red | |
| 2006 | Dünyayı Kurtaran Adamın Oğlu | Girl | |
| 2009 | Renklerde Kaybolan Hayat | Cecillia | |

=== TV series ===
TV series
| Year | Title | Role | Notes |
|---|---|---|---|
| 2003 | Lise Defteri | Aylin | |
| 2005–2008 | Emret Komutanım | Alev Hemşire | |
| 2007 | Üç Tatlı Cadı | Peri | |
| 2018 | Arka Sokaklar | Yelda | |

=== Theater ===
Theater
| Year | Title | Role | Notes |
|---|---|---|---|
| 2008–2009 | Eros Pansiyon | Nergis | |
| 2017–2018 | Sakın Diyorum Sakın | | |
| 2018–2019 | Kaçamak ya da Kaçamamak | | |

== Programs ==
TV programs
| Year | Title | Channel | Notes |
|---|---|---|---|
| | Bilgi Yarışması: SMS Size Milyarlar Sunuyoruz | Show TV | |
| | Almanya Hürriyet Baskı | Kanal D | |
| | New Year Program | TGRT | |
| | Style Program | rheinmaintv | |
| | Şebnem Schaefer'la Muhteşem Çocuklar | TV8 | |
| | Lütfen+1 Çevre | Bloomberg HT | |
| | Şebnem Schaefer'la Masal Uydurma Atölyesi | | |
| | Alman-Türk Film Festival | | |
| | Açılışlar, special events | | |
