= O Şarkılar =

Compilation album by Hakkı Yalçın
- Released: March 8, 2004
- Genre: World
- Length: 61:49
- Label: Düet Müzik
- Producer: Metin Özülkü

O Şarkılar... Hakkı Yalçın Şarkıları is 2004 album with songs written by Hakkı Yalçın. As his retirement as a lyricist and journalist, Hakkı Yalçın released this special album which contains some lyrics he wrote during his musical career. Every song is performed by a different Turkish artist. There's only one video taken for this album, that for "Sen Gittin mi Ben Ölürüm".

== Track listing ==
#	Title	English translation	Performer	Music by	Duration
1	"Sevme Kızım Yanarsın"	Don't fall in love my girl, you'll be hurt	İzel	Özkan Turgay	3:32
2	"Dönüşüm Muhteşem Olacak"	My return will be magnificent	Hakan Altun	Kadir Tapucu	4:47
3	"Sen Gittin mi Ben Ölürüm"	If you leave, I'll die	Işın Karaca	Hakkı Yalçın	4:45
4	"Son Kurşun"	Last bullet	Kibariye	Emrah Erdoğan	4:59
5	"Uçurum Çiçeği"	Cliff flower	Emrah	Ali Güven	3:30
6	"O Bilmiyor"	He doesn't know	Seda Sayan	Taner Demiralp	4:50
7	"Gün Oldu"	There was a day	Hakan Peker	Metin Özülkü	4:33
8	"Kapına Gül Bıraktım"	I left a rose in front of your door	Niran Ünsal	Sinan Özen	4:13
9	"Yalan mı"	Is it a lie?	Gökhan Özen	Mahsun Kırmızıgül	3:44
10	"Elveda İstanbul"	Goodbye Istanbul	Sinan Özen	Erhan Güleryüz	5:02
11	"Alışkanlık Yaparım"	I'll make a habit	Petek Dinçöz	Gökhan Özen	3:29
12	"Hani"	So where's	Metin Özülkü	Sinan Özen	4:48
13	"Yalanım Yok"	I don't have lie	Ali Güven	Taner Demiralp	4:20
14	"Intro Mix"				5:17

- All the lyrics written by Hakkı Yalçın.

== Credits ==
Musical Director: Metin Özülkü
Arrangements: Metin Özülkü & Genco Arı (Except "Alışkanlık Yaparım" that was arranged by Ahmet Özden)
Studio: Düet Müzik
Mastering: Serdar Ağırlı

Violin: Gündem Yaylı Grubu
Reed Flute: Eyüp Hamiş
Guitar: Erdem Sökmen
Clarinet: Bülent Altınbaş
Kanun: Aytaç Doğan
Buzuki: Metin Özülkü
Lute: Sinan Özen
Solo Violin: Ferda Anıl Yarkın
Ritm Saz 'a stringed instrument': Cengiz Ercümer
Back Vocals: Metin Özülkü, Sibel Sezal
Graphics: Levent Göçtü
Press: Onur Ofset
