= Ümit Sayın =

Music composer and singer

- Born: 26 April 1970 (age 56); İzmir, Turkey
- Education: Anadolu University (left)
- Occupations: Singer; songwriter; composer; arranger
- Years active: 1990–present

Ümit Sayın (born 26 April 1970) is a Turkish pop singer, composer and songwriter. Singer-songwriter Sezen Aksu, who was impressed by his voice at a concert in İzmir on 8 September 1990, and after performing a duet with him, she hired him as her backing vocalist. Sayın later worked as a backing vocalist for Harun Kolçak in 1992, Ajda Pekkan in 1993 and Tarkan in 1994–95. He began to write and compose songs in 1991 with the encouragement of Özkan Uğur and soon started to make songs for singers such as Harun Kolçak, Deniz Arcak, Emel Müftüoğlu, Erdal Çelik, Seden Gürel, Leman Sam, Hakan Peker, Burak Kut, İzel, Yeşim Salkım, Pınar Aylin, Suavi, Bendeniz, Tarkan, and Zeynep Dizdar. He continued his career successfully thanks to his musical relationship with Ozan Çolakoğlu. He released his self-titled debut album in 1992.

== Studio albums ==
List of albums and notes
Album	Album information	Notes
Ümit Sayın	Released: 1996; Label: İstanbul Plak; Format: MC, LP	
Ben Tabii ki	Released: 1999; Label: İstanbul Plak; Format:	
Mai	Released: 2004; Label: Columbia Records; Format: MC, LP, CD	
Söz-Müzik Ümit Sayın	Released: 2011; Label: Poll Production; Format: CD, digital download, LP	
Kendiliğinden	Released: 2014; Label: Poll Production; Format: CD, digital download, LP	

== Singles ==
List of albums and notes
Album	Album information	Notes
Takılma	Released: 2010; Label: Poll Production; Format: CD, Single	
Gitme (feat. Tarkan)	Released: 2011; Label: Poll Production; Format: CD, Single, Promo	

== Contributions ==
Year	Song	Artist	Album	Lyricist	Composer
1993	"Zehir Ettin"	Deniz Arcak	İçinde Aşk Var	Ümit Sayın	Ümit Sayın
1993	"Vurur"	Deniz Arcak	Nerde?	Ümit Sayın	Ümit Sayın
1993	"Gülendam"	Erdal Çelik	Ya Hep Ya Hiç	Ümit Sayın	Ümit Sayın
1993	"Dudağım Yangın Orman"	Harun Kolçak	En Büyük Aşk	Ümit Sayın	Ümit Sayın
1994	"Dön Bebeğim"	Tarkan	Aacayipsin	Ümit Sayın	Ümit Sayın
1994	"Bekle"	Tarkan	Aacayipsin	Ümit Sayın	Ozan Çolakoğlu
1994	"Gitme"	Tarkan	Aacayipsin	Kemal Sayın, Ümit Sayın	Ümit Sayın
1994	"Aşkımdan Vazgeçme"	Leman Sam	Eski Fotoğraflar	Ümit Sayın	Ozan Çolakoğlu
1994	"Çal Beni"	Emel Müftüoğlu	Emel'ce	Ümit Sayın	Ümit Sayın
1995	"Tutun Ellerimden"	İzel Çeliköz	Adak	Ümit Sayın	Ümit Sayın
1995	"Ya Sen Gidip De"	Pınar Aylin	Ben Bahara Hazırım	Ümit Sayın	Ümit Sayın
1995	"Hasret Türküsü"	Suavi	Yalıçapkını	Ümit Sayın	Ümit Sayın
1997	"Vazgeç Gönül"	Zeynep Dizdar	Yolun Açık Ola	Ümit Sayın	Ümit Sayın
1997	"Nerede Olursan Ol"	Zeynep Dizdar	Yolun Açık Ola	Ümit Sayın	Ümit Sayın
1997	"Hicaz"	Zeynep Dizdar	Yolun Açık Ola	Ümit Sayın	Ümit Sayın
1997	"Ben Senin Gölgenim"	Zeynep Dizdar	Yolun Açık Ola	Ümit Sayın	Ozan Çolakoğlu
1997	"Savrulduk"	Zeynep Dizdar	Yolun Açık Ola	Ümit Sayın	Ümit Sayın
1997	"Bir Hayvanın Günlüğünden"	Zeynep Dizdar	Yolun Açık Ola	Ümit Sayın	Ümit Sayın
1997	"Nankör"	Pınar Aylin	Güneşten	Ümit Sayın	Ümit Sayın
1999	"Gözleri Hüzün Yeşili"	Asya	Masum	Ümit Sayın	Ümit Sayın
1999	"Bu Şarkım Sana Sevgilim"	Deniz Seki	Anlattım	Ümit Sayın	Ümit Sayın, Ozan Çolakoğlu
2000	"Hayat Dediğin"	Levent Yüksel	Aşkla	Ümit Sayın	Ümit Sayın
2001	"Bir Nefeste"	Faruk K	Azar Azar	Ümit Sayın	Ümit Sayın
2004	"İsyanımı Bağışla"	Işın Karaca	İçinde Aşk Var	Ümit Sayın	Ümit Sayın
2004	"Kalbimin Sokağı"	Işın Karaca	İçinde Aşk Var	Ümit Sayın	Ümit Sayın
2017	"O Sevişmeler"	Tarkan	10	Ümit Sayın	Ümit Sayın
2017	"Geç Olmadan"	Murat Boz	Geç Olmadan	Ümit Sayın, Murat Boz	Ümit Sayın

* The list above includes songs given to other artists whose lyrics or music belong to Ümit Sayın. He has songs in his own albums that are written and composed by himself but are not mentioned in this list.
