= Bendeniz =

- Born: Deniz Çelik; 25 July 1973 (age 53); Zurich, Switzerland
- Other name: Abajur Kız
- Occupations: Singer; songwriter; composer
- Years active: 1993–present
- Musical career
- Genres: Pop; dance; rock
- Instrument: Vocals
- Labels: Raks; Universal; Talent; V&G; RMP; Seyhan; Poll
- Website: bendeniz.org

Bendeniz (born Deniz Çelik; 25 July 1973) is a Swiss-Turkish pop musician who is well known in Turkey. Her first album Bendeniz in 1993, was a great success thanks to a song called "Ya Sen Ya Hiç". She won the "gold record" award in a competition sponsored by a French TV station in 1995. Her music mixes world pop sound with traditional Turkish sounds.

== Early life ==
Bendeniz, whose real name is Deniz Çelik, was born on July 25, 1973, in Zurich. She is originally from Konya and lives in Yeniceoba county. She graduated from Erenköy Girls High School in Istanbul. After high school, she went to Switzerland, her native country for higher education. She went on to study at a vocational college in the field of office work. a time when he returned to Turkey, Turkey's first female soccer team played in Dostlukspor sha. She sang a song on a friend's birthday. She was discovered by Raks Music officials thanks to the piece she sang. She entered the world of music by releasing her first album with the image of "Lampshade Girl" created by Neslihan Yargıcı in 1993.

== Career ==
She made her debut with the song "Ya Sen Ya Hiç". Her first album with a great departing Bendeniz this album in Turkey's classic albums in 1994 along with Harun Kolçak "Us" album, they released a maxi-single. The track named "Not in My Hand" in the album became one of the best slow songs of the year. In 1995, he released his second album, "Bendeniz II". The first track released from the highly anticipated album was "What Will Happen". Subsequently, the song "Gönül Yareler İçinde" written by Ümit Sayın was published. It was one of the most prominent slow songs of the year. Lastly, the moving track called "Around the World in 80 Days" was released from the album. The album became one of the best albums of the year. It was accepted as the best album of Bendeniz. In 1996, she released the album "Bendeniz III". The album was an album containing Anatolian rock sounds. She has released thirteen studio albums and two singles to date.

== Discography ==
Albums

- Bendeniz, 1993
- Bendeniz II, 1995
- Bendeniz III, 1996
- Bendeniz'den, 1998
- Kurtulamıyorum, 1999
- Bendeniz Şarkıları, 2000 (Best of compilation)
- Zaman, 2001
- Demedim mi, 2003
- Aşk Yok Mu Aşk, 2005
- Değiştim, 2007
- Olsun, 2009
- Benden İzler, 2011
- Best of Bendeniz, Vol. 1, 2018
- Best of Bendeniz, Vol. 2, 2022

EPs and singles

- Biz, 1994
- O İnsan, 2017
- Evlenilir Mi Bu Zamanda, 2023
