= Başka Bahar =

Song by Işın Karaca

from the album Anadilim Aşk
- Genre: Pop
- Length: 4:09
- Label: Power Records
- Songwriter(s): Sezen Aksu

"Başka Bahar" is a pop song from Işın Karaca's Anadilim Aşk album. It was written by Sezen Aksu and arranged by Erdem Yörük. The song become very successful in music charts of Turkey, which led the song to represent Turkey in the OGAE song contest in 2002. However, it finished last without getting any points.

== Music video ==
Music video is shot by Kıvanç Baruönü in 2002. Unusually, Işın Karaca danced a lot in the video.

== Personnel ==
Erdem Yörük: Arranger
Eylem Pelit: Bass
G.M.G.: Wind instruments
Erdem Sökmen: Guitar
Nurkan Renda: Guitar
Gündem Yaylı Grubu: Stringed instruments
Cem Erman: Percussion
Nurcan Eren: Back vocals
Burak Kut: Back vocals
Işın Karaca: Back vocals
Ender Akay: Mix

== Song sample ==
Başka Bahar
Chorus of Işın Karaca's hit song from "Anadilim Aşk" Album
