= Hande Subaşı =

Turkish actress (born 1984)

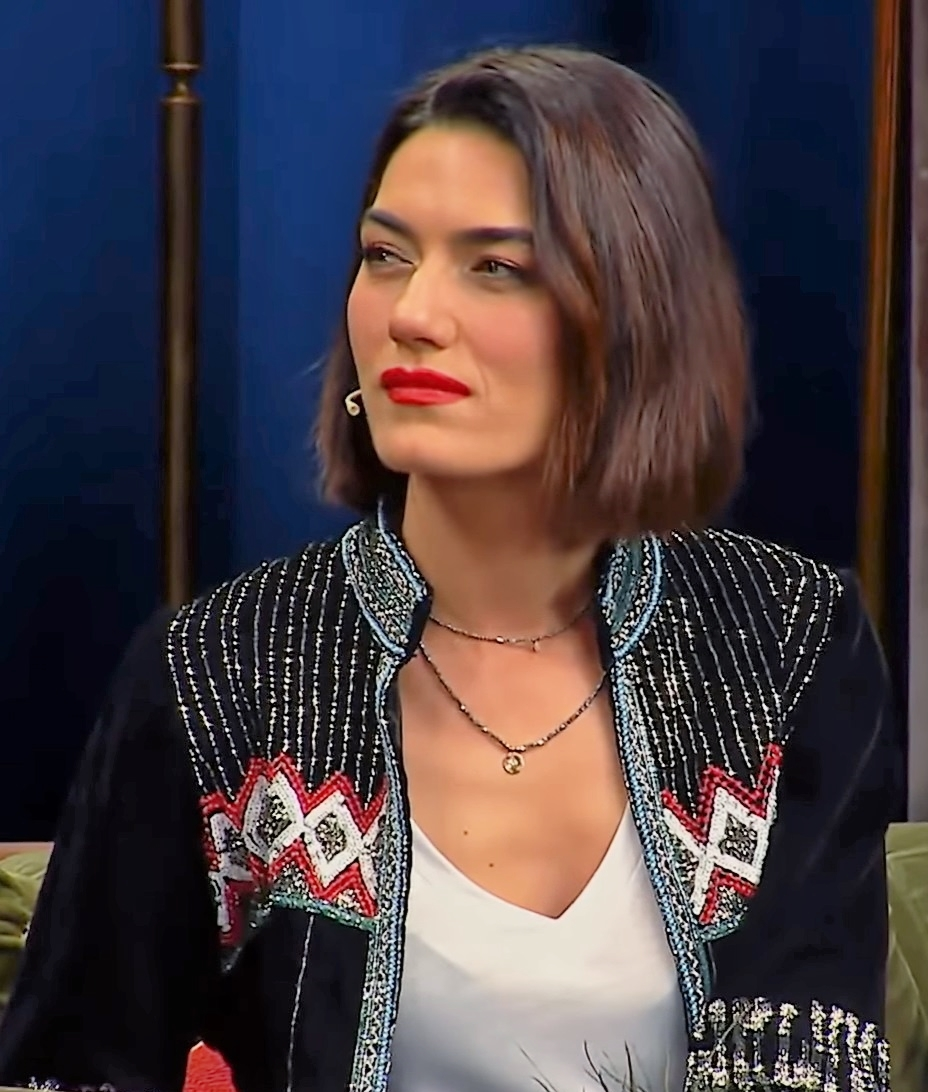
- Subaşı on Tolga Çevik's Tolgshow in 2018
- Born: 21 February 1984 (age 42); Ankara, Turkey
- Occupation: Actress
- Height: 1.8 m (5 ft 11 in)
- Spouse: Can Tursan (m. 2014; div. 2016)
- Beauty pageant titleholder
- Title: Miss Turkey 2005
- Eye color: Green
- Major competition: Miss Turkey 2005 (winner)

Hande Subaşı (born 21 February 1984) is a Turkish actress and beauty pageant titleholder. She was the winner of the 2005 Miss Turkey competition. As an actress, she has appeared in more than nine films and theatre since 2006.

== Filmography ==
Year	Title	Role
2009	Gelecekten Bir Gün	Ebru
2009	Güneşi Gördüm	Zehra
2010	Karanlık Hesaplaşma	
2011	Anadolu Kartalları	Müzisyen Burcu
2016	Propaganda 2	
2016	Seviyorum Ama Arkadaşça	Aslı
2016	Defne'nin Bir Mevsimi	Defne
2017	Aşk Uykusu	Seda
2022	Zevcat	Filiz

=== Tv Series ===
Year	Title	Role	Network	Notes
2006	Adak	Nazlı	Show TV	
2006	Kuşdili	Fidan	ATV	
2007	Elveda Rumeli	Vahide	ATV	
2010	Elde Var Hayat	Zeynep	TRT1	
2011	Elde Var Hayat Sınav	Zeynep	TRT1	
2011	Muhteşem Yüzyıl	Saliha	Show TV	Guest
2012	Düşman Kardeşler	Selin	Show TV	
2013	Merhamet		Kanal D	Guest
2014–2015	Diriliş Ertuğrul	Aykız	TRT1	
2017–2018	Bahtiyar Ölmez	Aylin	ATV	
2021	Baht Oyunu	Nergis	Kanal D	
2023	Alparslan: Büyük Selçuklu	Eudokia Makrembolitissa	TRT1	
2024	Leyla: Hayat... Aşk... Adalet...	Tuana	Now	
