= Hayrettin Karaoğuz =

Turkish actor (born 1984)

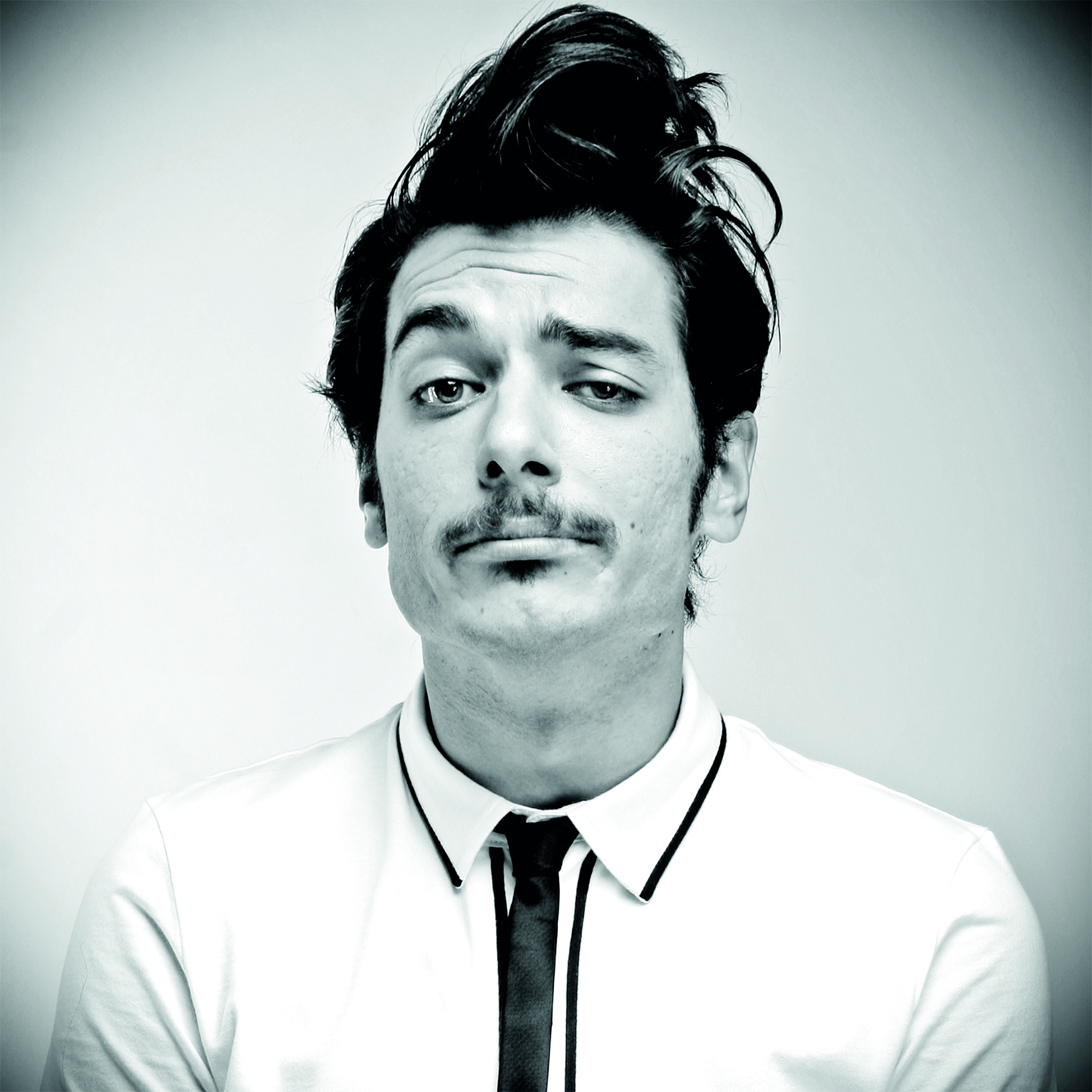
- Hayrettin
- Born: Hayrettin Onur Karaoğuz; 1 January 1984 (age 42); Bakırköy, Istanbul, Turkey
- Education: Kadir Has University

Comedy career
- Years active: 2009–present
- Medium: Film, television

Hayrettin Onur Karaoğuz (born 1 January 1984) is a Turkish comedian, showman, actor and advertising star.

== Filmography ==
=== Movies ===
- Kızsız Adam (2009) as Alper
- Gelecekten Bir Gün (2010) as Tolga
- Vezir Parmağı (2017) as Cumali
- İlk Öpücük (2017) as Necati

=== TV series ===
- Kalk Gidelim (2018–) as Ercan
- Menajerimi Ara (2020) as himself

=== TV programs ===
- Hayrettin (Star TV) (2011–2012)
- Harry (ATV) (2013)

=== Commercials ===
- Turkcell - Kisa Mesaj Kampanyası (2009)
- Doritos - Hisseli Tatlar Kampanyası (2010)
- Nesine.com (2012)
- Fanta (2013–2014)
- Çabuk Çorba (2015)
- Lovehoney Seks Oyuncakları (2016)
- Saloon Burger (2024)
