= Arabesque: Geçmiş, Geçmemiş Hiç... =

Arabesque

Studio album by Işın Karaca
- Released: April 22, 2010
- Genre: Arabesque music
- Length: 44:22
- Label: SM Gold, Akış Production
- Producer: Akın Büyükkaraca, Işın Karaca

Işın Karaca chronology
Uyanış (2009)	Arabesque (2010)	Arabesque II (2011)

Arabesque: Geçmiş, Geçmemiş Hiç... is the fifth studio album of Cypriot-Turkish singer Işın Karaca released on April 22, 2010. It features arabesque music style. Album includes Kibariye's hit song "Kim Bilir". Selami Şahin becomes Karaca's vocal coach for this album to help her sing in arabesque style. All songs are arranged by Selim Çaldıran. Album is recorded acoustically as well as her last 3 albums. Hüsnü Şenlendirici featured in "Ben Sevdalı, Sen Belalı".

First video for the album is shot for "Dert Bende Derman Sende" on April 15, 2010 directed by Sedat Doğan and released on April 22, 2010. Second video for "Mavi Mavi" is shot on March 23, 2010 in Maldives, and released on June 12, 2010.

The album's third music video, "Hor Görme Garibi", was directed by Sedat Doğan. It was first published on 1 November kraltv.com.tr website, before being broadcast on Kral TV on 2 November 2010.

The release date of the album was delayed due to the erupting volcano in Iceland, which affected Europe. The glassware from Germany, which was used for CD printing, was delivered in Turkey with a two-day delay as the air transport was interrupted by clouds of ash.

According to Mü-Yap, Arabesque was the 6th best-selling album in Turkey in 2010, and it became Karaca's most sold album at the time. It was awarded the "Best Concept Album (Female)" award at the İstanbul Fm Golden Awards.

== Track listing ==
1. "Dert Bende Derman Sende"
2. "Tanrım Beni Baştan Yarat"
3. "Mavi Mavi"
4. "Ben Sevdalı, Sen Belalı"
5. "Dilektaşı"
6. "Hor Görme Garibi"
7. "Diyemedim"
8. "Kim Bilir"
9. "Yalan"
10. "Ne Duamsın, Ne De Bedduam"
