= Ogeday =

Turkish rap singer (born 1981)

- Born: 22 December 1981 (age 44); Istanbul, Turkey
- Genre: Hip hop
- Occupations: Singer, rapper
- Years active: 2002–present
- Label: Ulus Müzik

Ogeday (born 22 December 1981) is a Turkish rap singer.

== Musical career ==
He has started his musical career with Respot in 1996. Group toured Turkey, and performed several concerts. He made several commercial jingles, most notably for Avea. He released his debut studio album Rapturka in May 2003. Turkish musician Sezen Aksu also supported this album.

He released his second studio album Mecburi İstikamet in 2006. He made duets with Zara, Işın Karaca and İbrahim Erkal.

== Discography ==
- Rapturka (2003)
- Mecburi İstikamet (2006)
- Maxi Single (2008) (single; together with Işın Karaca)

=== Music videos ===
Year	Title	Album	Video link
2003	"Yamacıma Gel"	Rapturka	
2003	"Kaybettim Seni"	Rapturka	
2003	"Varlık Bir (Version C)"	Rapturka	
2006	"İllüzyon"	Mecburi İstikamet	
