= Cansu =

- Gender: Female

Origin
- Meaning: Life Water or "Living Water"

Other names
- Related names: Can

Cansu is a Turkish name, most commonly given to females, and also serves as a surname. It combines the words can (Persian origin, meaning life, soul or spirit) and su (native Turkish, meaning water).

== Given name ==
- Cansu Akalın (born 1998), Turkish handball player
- Cansu Bektaş (born 2003), Turkish weightlifter
- Cansu Çetin (born 1993), Turkish volleyball player
- Cansu Dere (born 1980), Turkish model and actress
- Cansu Köksal (born 1994), Turkish basketball player
- Cansu Nur Kaya (born 2000), Turkish women's footballer
- Cansu Özbay (born 1996), Turkish volleyball player
- Cansu Özdemir (born 1988), German politician of Turkish descent
- Cansu Nimet Sayın (born 2003), Turkish hurdler
- Cansu Tiryaki (born 1990), Turkish football referee
- Cansu Yağ (born 1990), Turkish football player
- İlayda Cansu Kara (born 2005), Turkish footballer

== Surname ==
- Büşra Cansu (born 1990), Turkish volleyball player
