= Ey Aşkın Güzel Kızı =

Studio album by Işın Karaca
- Released: 30 January 2015
- Genre: Turkish classical music
- Length: 43:34
- Label: Seyhan Müzik

Işın Karaca chronology
Her Şey Aşktan (2013)	Ey Aşkın Güzel Kızı (2015)	Eyvallah (2016)

Ey Aşkın Güzel Kızı is the eighth studio album of Cypriot-Turkish singer Işın Karaca released digitally on 30 January 2015 and physically on 3 February 2015. It features Turkish classical music style, being her third project after her two arabesque albums. A promotional video for the album was released on 26 January 2015 on YouTube.

The first video is shot for "Bir Garip Yolcu (Yalan Dünya)" directed by Deniz Akel, released on 13 February 2015.

== Track listing ==
1. "Bir Garip Yolcu (Yalan Dünya)" - 4:05
2. "Ah Bu Şarkıların" - 5:39
3. "Bir İlk Bahar Sabahı" - 4:27
4. "Affetmem Asla Seni" - 4:01
5. "İntizar" - 3:25
6. "Senede Bir Gün" - 3:40
7. "Gündüzüm Seninle Gecem Seninle" - 3:39
8. "Seni Ben Ellerin Olsun Diye Mi Sevdim" - 4:41
9. "Biz Ayrılamayız" - 3:45
10. "İçin İçin Yanıyor" - 3:11
11. "Adını Anmayacağım" - 3:01
