= İçinde Aşk Var =

Studio album by Işın Karaca
- Released: 16 December 2004
- Genre: Pop
- Length: 45:15
- Label: Seyhan Müzik, İmaj
- Producer: Işın Karaca

Işın Karaca chronology
Anadilim Aşk (2001)	İçinde Aşk Var (2004)	Başka 33/3 (2006)

İçinde Aşk Var (English: There's Love Inside) is Işın Karaca's second solo album which was released on 16 December 2004. There's also a song written by herself in the album. Other writers are: Sezen Aksu, Aysel Gürel, Suat Suna, Ümit Sayın, etc. First video is taken for "Yetinmeyi bilir misin?". It was said that Turkish musician Serkan take out this song from his debut album and gave to Karaca. There are two Karacas in the video; a good and an evil Karaca. Second video is shot for "Bekleyelim de Görelim". The last video is taken to an Onno Tunç cover "Hoşgörü", which was previously sung by Sezen Aksu. Işın Karaca and her crew starred in the video; Erdem Yörük, her brother & manager Akın Büyükkaraca, her vocalist Jale (former Academy Turkey contestant) also starred in the video. "Yetinmeyi Bilir misin?" won the best lyrics award in Kral TV Video ve Music Awards.

== Track listing ==
No.	Title	Writer(s)	English translation	Length
1.	"Yetinmeyi Bilir misin?"	Sezen Aksu, Serkan	Do You know to content?	4:40
2.	"Kayıp Gölgeler"	Aysel Gürel, Işın Karaca	Lost Shadows	3:53
3.	"Bekleyelimde Görelim"	Sezen Aksu	Let's Wait and See	4:44
4.	"Gece"	Günay Çoban & Müfit Bayraşa	Night	5:05
5.	"Hoşgörü"	Aysel Gürel & Onno Tunç	Tolerance	4:39
6.	"Tercüme"	Aysel Gürel& Müfit Bayraşa	Translation	4:02
7.	"Zamansız"	Suat Suna	Untimely	3:52
8.	"İsyanımı Bağışla"	Ümit Sayın	Forgive My Rebellion	3:48
9.	"Sen"	Suat Suna	You	3:20
10.	"Sevgiliye Son Sözler"	Günay Çoban, Dupere&Tadros	Last Words to Lover	3:41
11.	"Kalbimin Sokağı"	Ümit Sayın	Street of My Heart	3:41

note: Işın Karaca is not credited as lyricist for "Kayıp Gölgeler" in backside cover of the album, while she was listed as co-lyricist inside album liner notes. However, both notes denote music by Işın Karaca. Aysel Gürel expressed that the lyrics completely written by her and accused Işın Karaca for describing herself as a co-lyricist.

== Personnel ==
Erdem Yörük: Arrangement (1-3,5,10) Brass arrangement (5) Keman arrangement (7)
Sadun Ersönmez: Arrangement (4,7-9,11) Piano (11)
Ozan Bayraşa: Arrangement (6)
Işın Karaca: Back vocals (1,3-9)
Erdem Sökmen: Classical guitar (1,2,10,11) Acoustic guitar (2-4,7-9) Electro guitar (3)
İsmail Soyberk: Bass guitar (1,4,7-9,11)
Mehmet Akatay: Percussion (1,2,4,6,8,9)
Hamdi Akatay: Percussion (2,6,8,9)
Eyüp Hamiş: Ney (1) Zurna (6)
Hüseyin Bitmez: Ud (1)
Gündem: Yaylılar (1,2,4,6-8) Keman (11)
Selçuk Suna: Back vocals (1-6,8) Soprano Saxafon (7)
Nurcan Eren: Back vocals (1,2,6)
Sibel Gürsoy: Back vocals (1-4,6,8,11)
Ercüment Vural: Back vocals (1-6,8)
İsmail Tunçbilek: Bağlama (2)
Eylem Pelit: Bass (2,5,6) Brass arrangement (5)
Tuba Önal: Back Vocals (3-5,8)
Turgut Alpbekoğlu: Davul (4,7,11) Snare Drums (6)
Onno Tunç: Brass solo arrangement (5)
Ercüment Ateş: Electro guitar (5,6)
Levent Altındağ: Brass section (5,6,9)
Şenova Ülker: Brass section (5,6,9) Trompet (8)
Aycan Teztel: Brass section (5,6,9)
Suat Suna: Keman arrangement (7) Solo Keman (7)
Ayda Tunç: Yaylılar (7,10)
İstanbul Quartet: Yaylılar (9,10)
Tarık Sezer: Piano (10)
Dimos: Akerdeon (10)

== Credits ==
Production: imaj
Producer: Cemal Noyan
Producer: Işın Karaca
Musical Director: Erdem Yörük
Project Coordinator: Akın Büyükkaraca & Müge Kolat
Production Assistant: Taner Sunay
Record & Edit: Aykut Şahlanan (imaj)
Mix & Mastering: Ulaş Ağce (imaj)
Mix Assistant: Erkut Görmez
Photographs: Koray Kasap
Graphic Design: PIN Concept
Press: FRS
Make-up: Ahmet Yıldırım
Hair: Serkan Öner (MVA)
Costumes: Sumak

== Music videos ==
- Yetinmeyi Bilir misin on YouTube
- Bekleyelim de Göreli on YouTube
- Hoşgörü on YouTube

== Song samples ==
Işın Karaca - Bekleyelim de Görelim
Chorus of Işın Karaca's hit song from "İçinde Aşk Var" Album
