= Zeynep Dizdar =

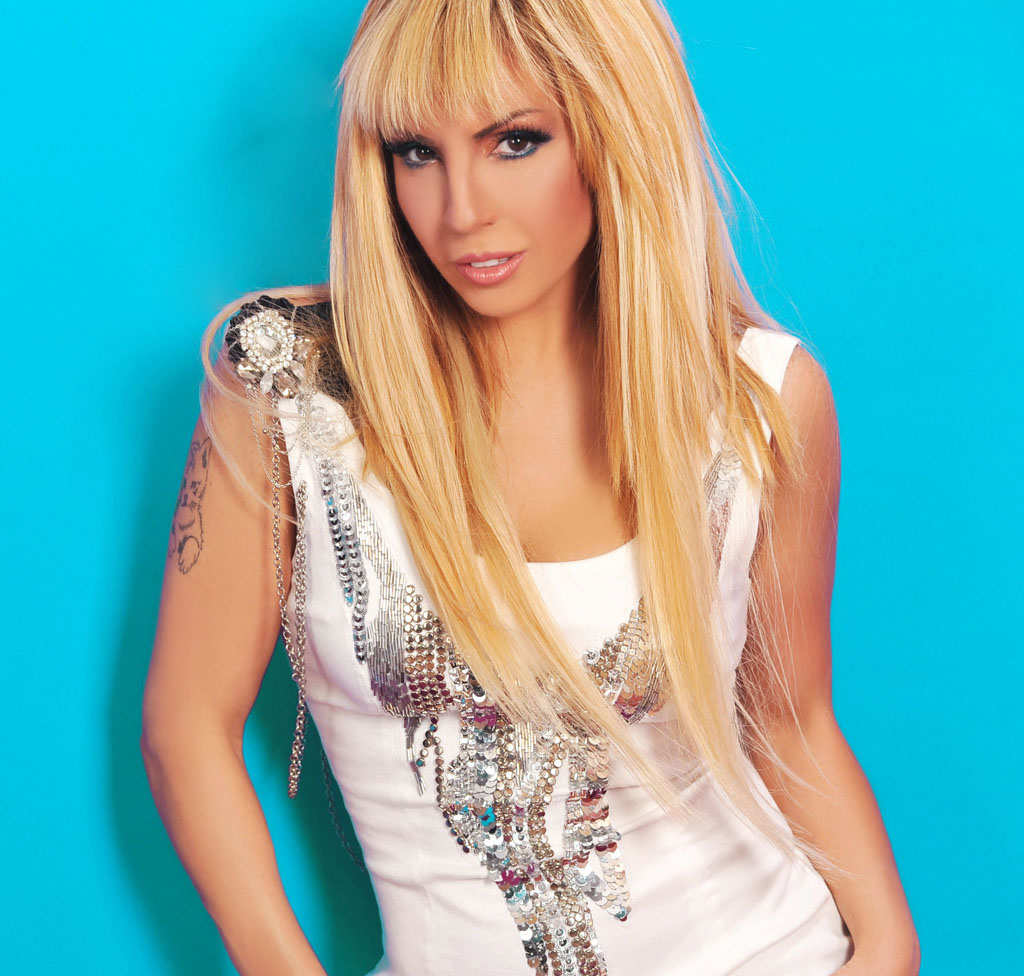
- Dizdar in 2011

Background information
- Born: 14 July 1976 (age 49); Kadıköy, Istanbul, Turkey
- Genres: Pop
- Occupation(s): Singer-songwriter, composer
- Instrument: Vocals
- Years active: 1997–present
- Labels: İstanbul (1997–2005); Sony (2005–2008); Erol Köse (2008–2009); Seyhan (2009–2010); Erol Köse (2010–2011); Kaya (2011–2012); DMC (2012–)

Zeynep Dizdar (born 14 July 1976) is a Turkish singer-songwriter and composer.

== Life and career ==
Zeynep Dizdar stepped into her professional music life in 1997 with her debut album, Yolun Açık Ola. Dizdar, who took the first place in the radio and music charts with the song "Vazgeç Gönül" in the album, received positive reviews from the music critics with this song and album. A music video was shot for the song "Nerede Olursan Ol". The song "Bir Hayvanın Günlüğünden", included in the same album, became one of the rare songs written for animals in the Turkish pop music history. Dizdar released her second studio album, İlle de Sen, in 2005. Produced by Ozan Çolakoğlu, İlle de Sen was released by Sarı Ev and Sony Music. Zeynep Dizdar wrote the lyrics for the songs "Yok Yok" and "Zehir Gibi", which became national hits.

Recordings for her third album, Sana Güvenmiyorum, began in July 2007, and the album was released a year later in July 2008. Five songs in this album were written and composed by Dizdar herself, and the songs "Sana Güvenmiyorum" and "Boşver" entered Turkey's official music chart. Dizdar's fourth album, Hayat Benim Elimde, was released in July 2010 by Erol Köse Production. For the first time in this album, Dizdar performed a cover of "Bir Çocuk Sevdim", written by Sezen Aksu and composed by Onno Tunç.

== Discography ==
=== Albums ===
- 1997: Yolun Açık Ola
- 2005: İlle de Sen
- 2008: Sana Güvenmiyorum
- 2010: Hayat Benim Elimde
- 2011: Viraj
- 2015: Gönül Oyunu

=== EPs and singles ===
- 2009: Aşkın Büyüsü
- 2012: 2012
- 2012: Maske
- 2013: İkimiz
- 2014: Party
- 2018: Bi Gülüşü
- 2018: Önsezi
- 2020: Kör Kurşun (feat. Murat Uyar)

=== Songds written/composed by Dizdar ===
| Title | Singer |
|---|---|
| "Heves" | Reyhan Karaca |
| "Ben Senin İçin Varım" | Suat Aydoğan |
| "Mızrak" | Bulut Duman |
| "Yarım Kalan Aşk" | Zeynep Mansur |
| "Adalet Yerinde" | Faruk K |

=== Charts ===
| Album | Single | Peak |
| Album | Single | Türkiye |
|---|---|---|
| Sana Güvenmiyorum | "Sana Güvenmiyorum" | 4 |
| Sana Güvenmiyorum | "Boşver" | 15 |
| Aşkın Büyüsü | "Aşkın Büyüsü" | 2 |
| Hayat Benim Elimde | "Hayat Benim Elimde" | 20 |
| Hayat Benim Elimde | "Bir Çocuk Sevdim" | 11 |
