= Eyvallah (album) =

Studio album by Işın Karaca
- Released: 1 December 2017
- Genre: Pop
- Length: 43:34
- Label: Akış Production

Işın Karaca chronology
Ey Aşkın Güzel Kızı (2015)	Eyvallah (2017)	Sen Ben Aşk (2022)

Singles from Eyvallah
- 1. "Az Bi Mesafe" Released: 4 June 2014; 2. "Güzelim" Released: 10 June 2016; 3. "Sevmekten Anladığım" Released: 20 January 2017; 4. "Çakma" Released: 11 July 2017; 5. "Bize De Bu Yakışır" Released: 1 December 2017

Eyvallah (Turkish phrase with Arabic origin similar to Okay), is Turkish-Cypriot pop music singer Işın Karaca's ninth studio album, released digitally on 1 December 2017. She released "Az Bi Mesafe" in June 2014 as a single. After this single she made a Turkish classical music project, Ey Aşkın Güzel Kızı.

The second single from the album, "Güzelim" (Turkish: I'm beautiful or My beauty), a cover version of "Maghroum" by Yara, was released on 10 June 2016. The music video premiered on 4 July 2016, directed by Mustafa Özen.

The third single, "Sevmekten Anladığım" (Turkish: What I understand from love), which was a duet with Sefa Chesmeberah, was released on 20 January 2017. On 11 July 2017, she released "Çakma", the fourth single from the album. The fifth single "Bize De Bu Yakışır" is released with the release of the album.

== Track listing ==
#	Title	Written by	Duration
1	"Eyvallah"	Elif Nun İçelli	4:10
2	"Bize De Bu Yakışır"	Akın Büyükkaraca, Işın Karaca, Selim Bölükbaşı	3:50
3	"Allak Bullak"	Sefa Cheshmberah	4:03
4	"Az Bi Mesafe"	Soner Sarıkabadayı	4:05
5	"Aşk"	Işın Karaca	4:02
6	"Sevmekten Anladığım" (with Sefa Chesmeberah)	Sefa Cheshmberah	4:50
7	"Çakma"	Elif Nun İçelli	2:56
8	"Güzelim"	Jean Marie Riachi, Işın Karaca, Fatih Ertür, Sefa Chesmeberah, Tuğrul Odabaş	3:48
9	"Tarihler Yazdı"	Sefa Cheshmberah	4:00
