= Uyanış =

Studio album by Işın Karaca
- Released: 29 May 2009
- Genre: Pop, R&B
- Label: SM Gold, Akış Production
- Producer: Işın Karaca, Akın Büyükkaraca

Işın Karaca chronology
| Başka 33/3 (2006) | Uyanış (2009) | Arabesque (2010) |

Uyanış (Turkish pronunciation: [ujænɯʃ], transl. Awakening), is the fourth studio album by Işın Karaca, released on 29 May 2009. She worked with sibel Alaş, Erdem Yörük, Erol Temizel and Zeki Güner. The album has a different sound compared to her previous albums, it also has R&B and electronic elements. She is the songwriter for several songs in the album.

== Background ==
It is announced that she was working with Mirkelam, Dolapdere Big Gang and Hüsnü Şenlendirici. She was to perform 2 songs with a symphony orchestra. There would be a duet with Hüsnü Şenlendirici, one of the songs was arranged by Dolapdere Big Gang group, which is known for their ethnic musical style. Also famous Turkish pop singer Mirkelam gave a song for this album. But none of these could be prepared for the final release.

Initially, album name was chosen as "Aşkın Uyanışı" (English: Awakening of love), but later it was simplified to "Uyanış". The release date of 7 March 2008 was first postponed to autumn 2008 and then to 7 March 2009. The album was postponed for the third time after the original recordings were stolen with her laptop PC. Finally, the album was released on 29 May 2009 with SM Gold and Akış Production label.

First video for the album was decided for a slow song "Uyanış". It was delivered to radio stations on 24 April 2009. But then the first video was changed to an up-beat song "Bilmece", as the summer was coming. The video, shot in Indian style, was published on her website and delivered to TVs on 29 May 2009. The second video was shot for Uyanış by Sedat Doğan and Cem Başeskioğlu in January 2010. It was released to music channels on 5 February 2010.

Işın Karaca and Zeki Güner wrote 6 of the songs together. She also has two more collaborations. Işın Karaca and Erdem Yörük composed 6 songs together for this album.

== Track listing ==
| # | Title | Translation | Lyricist | Composer | Duration |
|---|---|---|---|---|---|
| 1 | "Uyanış" (aka "Yangın Yeminler") | Awakening | Işın Karaca & Zeki Güner | Işın Karaca & Erdem Yörük | 4:45 |
| 2 | "5 Dakika" (featuring Ege Çubukçu) | 5 minutes | Sibel Alaş | Işın Karaca & Erdem Yörük | 4:47 |
| 3 | "Gidemedim" | I couldn't go | Zeki Güner | Raşit Gözdamla | 6:08 |
| 4 | "Sessiz Hikayem" | My silent story | Işın Karaca & Zeki Güner | Işın Karaca & Erdem Yörük | 4:23 |
| 5 | "Bilmece" | Puzzle | Işın Karaca & Zeki Güner | Işın Karaca | 3:31 |
| 6 | "1000 Yalan" | 1000 lies | Işın Karaca & Zeki Güner | Işın Karaca & Erdem Yörük | 4:46 |
| 7 | "Ben Bilirim" | I know | Işın Karaca & Zeki Güner | Işın Karaca & Erdem Yörük | 4:06 |
| 8 | "Aşk Çizgisi" | Love line | Işın Karaca & Sibel Alaş | Işın Karaca & Erdem Yörük | 4:25 |
| 9 | "Başrol" | Leading role | Işın Karaca & Zeki Güner & Funky C | Işın Karaca & Funky C | 4:31 |
| 10 | "Bambaşka Biri" | Totally different person | Fikret Şeneş | Frederic Mania | 4:57 |

== Personnel ==
- Arrangement: Erim Ardal (1), Erdem Yörük (2,4,6,8,10), Genco Arı (3), Hakan Yeşilkaya (5,7), Erol Temizel (9)
- Producer: Bülent Seyhan
- Executive producers: Işın Karaca & Akın Büyükkaraca
- Musical directors: Işın Karaca & Akın Büyükkaraca & Erdem Yörük
- Backing vocals: Işın Karaca, Uğur Akyürek, Yonca Karadağ, Murat Aziret
