= Sen Ben Aşk =

Studio album by Işın Karaca
- Released: 28 March 2022
- Genre: Pop
- Length: 45:14
- Label: Akış Müzik

Işın Karaca chronology
Eyvallah (2017)	Sen Ben Aşk (2022)	The Best In Symphonic (2023)

Singles from Sen Ben Aşk
- 1. "Geri Gelme" Released: 15 January 2020; 2. "Mevzu Aşksa" Released: 20 November 2020; 3. "Serçe" Released: 5 March 2021; 4. "Bir Yol Var" Released: 18 June 2021; 5. "Rest" Released: 28 March 2022; 6. "Gurbetlik" Released: 28 September 2022; 7. "Bu Gece" Released: 21 November 2022

Sen Ben Aşk (Turkish: You Me Love), is Turkish-Cypriot pop music singer Işın Karaca's tenth studio album, released digitally on 28 March 2022.

The first single "Geri Gelme" was released on 15 January 2020. She recorded another version for the 2022 release of the album. Second single "Mevzu Aşksa", that has two songs "Mevzu Bu mu?" and "Nazarlardanmış" was released on 20 November 2020. Third single "Serçe" was released on 5 March 2021. Fourth single "Bir Yol Var" was released on 18 June 2021. Fifth single "Rest" was released with the album.

The album has two Sezen Aksu covers: "Bu Gece" and "Tükeneceğiz".

== Track listing ==
1. "Intro Rest Deluxe" (written by Can Yapıcıoğlu, Işın Karaca and Murat Han Turgut) - 3:13
2. "Rest" (written by Can Yapıcıoğlu and Işın Karaca) - 3:35
3. "Bu Gece" (written by Onno Tunç and Sezen Aksu) - 2:58
4. "Ah Yan" (written by Can Yapıcıoğlu and Işın Karaca) - 3:11
5. "Tükeneceğiz" (written by Sezen Aksu) - 4:53
6. "Gurbetlik" (written by Can Yapıcıoğlu and Zeki Güner) - 2:41
7. "Geri Gelme 2022" (written by Zeki Güner) - 2:49
8. "Bir Yol Var" (written by Cansu Kurtcu) - 4:11
9. "Mevzu Bu Mu" (written by Can Yapıcıoğlu and Işın Karaca) - 4:43
10. "Rest - House Version" - 4:02
11. "Serçe" (written by Mehmet Barnığ) - 4:22
12. "Nazarlardanmış" (written by Can Yapıcıoğlu) - 4:30
