= Arda Kural =

Turkish actor (born 1980)

- Born: 12 April 1980 (age 46); Yalova, Turkey
- Occupation: Actor
- Years active: 1990–present

Arda Kural (born 12 April 1980) is a Turkish actor. He studied at Yalova Teknik and Endüstri Meslek High School. Following 2 years of drama training, he started acting professionally at the Tiyatroroman Theatre. He also worked at Kral TV as a VJ for a short time.

In 1999, Kural made his television debut in the popular series Eyvah Kızım Büyüdü where he acted with Haluk Bilginer, his ex-lover Yıldız Asyalı and Nergis Kumbasar. He appearing in Şemsi Paşa Pasajı and Kuzenlerim.

With Şebnem Schaefer, he starred in successful teenage series Lise Defteri and as Posta Ferit in popular military comedy series Emret Komutanım for twice times.

In 2005, he acted in the films Banyo directed by Mustafa Altıoklar and Sahne. Kural appeared in the film Gelecekten Bir Gün in 2010 directed by Boğaçhan Dündar.

After realizing that he would only earn ₺21,890 for his role in the movie Kubilay, he started to show signs of psychosis due to financial issues and on 28 December 2012 he was hospitalized at the Bakırköy Psychiatric Hospital. He was discharged from the hospital on 21 January 2013 and announced that he would retire from acting, though he later changed his mind.

Kural lived at an apartment in Büyükçekmece together with his mother, but after not paying the rent, they were forced to evacuate on 9 July 2015. His mother started to stay with his elder brother, however, Kural remained at a garden near his former apartment. He was later removed from the area by the police following neighbors' request. Kural then started to stay at a cafe in Büyükçekmecede with the help of a friend.

A few days after the news about him came out, Büyükçekmece Municipality announced that they would help the Kural family solve their financial issues. Meanwhile, Arda Kural disappeared and it was revealed that his family were not able to locate him.

== Filmography ==
=== Films ===
| Year | Title | Role | Notes |
|---|---|---|---|
| 2004 | Düşenin Dostu | Said | TV film |
| 2005 | Beyza'nın Kadınları | Naim | Film |
| 2005 | Banyo | Oğuz | Film |
| 2006 | Sahne | Gezgin | TV film |
| 2010 | Gelecekten Bir Gün | Felek | Film |
| 2010 | Kubilay | Mustafa Fehmi Kubilay | Film |
| 2012 | Ayaz | Emre | TV film |
| 2013 | Kutsal Bir Gün | - | Film |
| 2016 | Nefrin El Turab | | Film |

=== TV Series ===
| Year | Title | Role | Notes |
|---|---|---|---|
| 1999 | Eyvah Kızım Büyüdü | Altay | TV series |
| 2000 | Şemsi Paşa Pasajı | | TV series |
| 2000 | Kuzenlerim | Oğuz | TV series |
| 2003 | Lise Defteri | Ediz | TV series |
| 2004 | Çınaraltı | Kenan | TV series |
| 2004 | Canım Benim | Barış | TV series |
| 2005 | Beşinci Boyut | Mehmet | Guest appearance |
| 2005 | Emret Komutanım | Posta Ferit | TV series |
| 2006 | Kızlar yurdu | Asker Ferit | TV series |
| 2007 | Kaptan | Yavuz | TV series |
| 2007 | Kelebek Çıkmazı | Selim | TV series |
| 2007 | Çok Özel Tim | Kemal | TV series |
| 2008 | Büyük Buluşma | Berk | TV series |
| 2008 | Emret Komutanım | Ferit | TV series |
| 2008 | Düğün Şarkıcısı | Yıldıray | TV series |
| 2008 | Dur Yolcu | Mustafa Kemal | TV series |
| 2009 | Doludizgin Yıllar | Savaş | TV series |
| 2011 | Kurşun Bilal | Kurşun Bilal | TV series |
