= Anadilim Aşk =

Studio album by Işın Karaca
- Released: November 28, 2001
- Genre: Pop
- Length: 54:48
- Label: Power Records, SM Gold
- Producer: Sezen Aksu

Işın Karaca chronology
Anadilim Aşk (2001)	İçinde Aşk Var (2004)

Second release cover
- Cover of Second release with Tutunamadım Remix

Anadilim Aşk (English: My Native Language is Love) is Işın Karaca's debut album, it was released at 2001 with Power Records label. All the songs are written by Sezen Aksu, except two of them co-written by Ali İlyas and Sezen Aksu. The first video became "Tutunamadım". The second video is shot for "Başka Bahar", which become very successful in music charts of Turkey. After this success in Turkey, the song is chosen to represent Turkey in OGAE in 2002. However, it became the last without getting any points in the contest. The third video is shot for "Aramıza Yollar" by Lebanese director Waleed Nassif. This video is the first video in High Definition format in Turkey. Famous Turkish actor Toprak Sergen also starred in the video. The fourth video is shot for "Doğum Günün Kutlu Olsun Oğlum", but it was not aired due to conflicts with her company. The album sold-out quickly and released second time with addition of "Tutunamadım Remix". In 2006, the album re-released with SM Gold label.

== Album history ==
Işın Karaca worked for about seven years as back vocalist of Sezen Aksu. Sezen Aksu, a famous Turkish star, wanted to help her with her debut album, so the album is entirely produced by Aksu.

In the song "Lamba", piano is performed by Onno Tunç, a famous musician who died in a plane crash in 1996. The piano samples were originally performed in Zuhal Olcay's song "Kod Adım Leyla" in her Oyuncu album in 1996. The piano compositions are cleaned from the song and then added to "Lamba". The reason for that is; Sezen Aksu and Onno Tunç worked together and made very successful works in Turkey. Işın never met Onno Tunç, because Onno died just before Işın and Sezen met. So she missed the chance of working with Onno. And this become one of her wishes which was impossible after Onno's death. Aksu, who knows Işın's dream, ordered to clean the piano samples. The song was then arranged by Ayda Tunç, daughter of Onno. It was a surprise for Işın, because, Aksu didn't tell this to her unless the song was finished.

The song "Doğum Günün Kutlu Olsun Oğlum" (English: Happy birthday my son) was written by Sezen Aksu in Işın's house in mother's day. Sezen Aksu was returned from her visit to Italy. She was touched by the death fasts and then she wrote this song about the incidents.

== Track listing ==
#	Title	Translation	Written by	Time
1	"Tutunamadım"	I Couldn't Hold On	Sezen Aksu	4:01
2	"Yaz"	Summer	Sezen Aksu, Ali İlyas	4:27
3	"Başka Bahar"	Another Spring	Sezen Aksu	4:04
4	"Kalbim Ağrıyor"	My Heart Is Aching	Sezen Aksu	4:49
5	"Aşktan N'aber"	What About Love	Sezen Aksu	4:05
6	"Çikita"	Chikita	Sezen Aksu	3:26
7	"Bitmemiş Tango"	Unfinished Tango	Sezen Aksu, Ali İlyas	4:49
8	"Lamba"	Lamp	Sezen Aksu	3:59
9	"Anadilim Aşk"	My Native Language is Love	Sezen Aksu	3:57
10	"Kan Tutmuyor"	Blood Doesn't Hold	Sezen Aksu	5:02
11	"Aramıza Yollar"	Ways Between Us	Sezen Aksu	4:30
12	"Doğum Günün Kutlu Olsun Oğlum"	Happy Birthday My Son	Sezen Aksu	3:06

Bonus track (added by the second release)

#	Title	Translation	Written by	Time
13	"Tutunamadım (Remix)"	I Couldn't Hold On	Sezen Aksu	4:59

== Credits ==
Production: Power Records
Producer: Sezen Aksu
Mix: Studio Maslak B
Mastering: Çağlar Türkmen
Photographs: Tamer Yılmaz
Graphic Design: Ultra
Hair: Serpil Yıldız
Make-up: Fatka and Suzan Kardeş

== Music videos ==
- Tutunamadım
- Başka Bahar
- Aramıza Yollar

== Song samples ==
Işın Karaca - Tutunamadım
Chorus of Işın Karaca's hit song from "Anadilim Aşk" Album

Işın Karaca - Başka Bahar
Chorus of Işın Karaca's hit song from "Anadilim Aşk" Album

== Release history ==
Date	Label	Barcode	Catalog
2001-11-28	Universal Music (Power Records)	8697420470470	POW-CD 002
	İmaj Music	8698201090740	
2006-12-01	Seyhan Music	8697415716705	
