= Arabesque II: Geçmiş Bize Yakışıyor =

Arabesque II

Studio album by Işın Karaca
- Released: 7 July 2011
- Genre: Arabesque music
- Length: 44:22
- Label: Seyhan Müzik

Işın Karaca chronology
Arabesque (2010)	Arabesque II (2011)	Her Şey Aşktan (2013)

Singles from Arabesque II
- 1. "Tanrım" Released: 4 November 2011; 2. "Ben İnsan Değil miyim" Released: 26 April 2012

Arabesque II: Geçmiş Bize Yakışıyor (Turkish: Past suits us), is the second arabesque album (sixth overall) of Cypriot-Turkish pop music singer Işın Karaca, released on 7 July 2011. Her previous Arabesque album sold more than 100,000 copies and became the 6th most selling album in Turkey. This leads her to release a sequel album. The album was recorded acoustically and recording finished on March 4. Selami Şahin is the vocal coach of Karaca, like the previous album.

The first song "Gönül" was sent to radios on 29 June 2011. But the first video was shot for "Tanrım" and was directed by Sedat Doğan. The video was released on 3 November 2011 on the internet and on Kral Pop channel the next day. The second and last video was shot for "Ben İnsan Değil miyim", directed by Kemal Başbuğ, and released on 26 April 2012.

== Track listing ==
1. "Ben İnsan Değil miyim"
2. "Gönül" (written by Orhan Gencebay)
3. "Dertler Benim Olsun"
4. "Tanrım"
5. "Yağmur"
6. "Kendim Ettim Kendim Buldum"
7. "Sen Affetsen Ben Affetmem"
8. "Sabaha Kadar"
9. "Gülüm Benim"
10. "Neden Saçların Beyazlamış Arkadaş"
11. "Seni Sevmeyen Ölsün"
12. "Ben İnsan Değil miyim (Remix)"
