= Başka 33/3 =

Studio album by Işın Karaca
- Released: 19 June 2006
- Genre: Pop
- Length: 48:05
- Label: SM Gold, Akış Production
- Producer: Işın Karaca, Akın Büyükkaraca, Erdem Yörük

Işın Karaca chronology
İçinde Aşk Var (2004)	Başka 33/3 (2006)	Uyanış (2009)

Başka 33/3 (Different) is Işın Karaca's third solo album. Başka 33/3 was released on 19 June 2006. In this album, she has written "Herşeye Rağmen" with Erdem Yörük.

The name of the album on the cover is stylized as "Başka" to highlight the word "aşk", which means "love" in Turkish.

The first video for the album is shot for "Mandalinalar", directed by Kubilay Kasap. The second video came to "Kalp Tanrıya Emanet". Third video is an Onur Mete song "Bırakma".

== Track listing ==
#	Title	Translation	Written by	Time
1	"Intro"			1:13
2	"Aradığım Aşk"	The Love I search For	Alper Narman, Fettah Can	5:05
3	"Lambalı Radyo"	Radio With Lights	Alper Narman, Fettah Can	5:45
4	"Mandalinalar"	Mandarins	Alper Narman, Fettah Can	4:57
5	"Kalp Tanrıya Emanet"	Heart Trusted to God	Yasemin Pulat, Bülent Özdemir	4:37
6	"Herşeye Rağmen (33/3)"	Despite Everything	Yasemin Pulat, Işın Karaca, Erdem Yörük	4:50
7	"Ayrı Ayrı"	Separated	Alper Narman, Fettah Can	3:32
8	"Bedava Öylesine"	Such Free	Alper Narman, Fettah Can	4:21
9	"Bırakma"	Do not Leave	Onur Mete	5:19
10	"İki Eksi Bir"	Two Minus One	Alper Narman, Fettah Can	3:22
11	"Bye Bye"	Bye Bye	Alper Narman, Fettah Can	5:07
33 ^{[1]}	"Aradığım Aşk (instrumental)" [hidden track]	The Love I search For	Alper Narman, Fettah Can	5:03

[1]:Tracks 12–32 are silence.

== Personnel ==
Cem Erman – Percussion
Eylem Pelit – Bass
Erdem Sökmen – Classic & Acoustic Guitar
Gültekin Kaçar – Electrical Guitar
Ant Şimşek – Electrical Guitar
Erdem Yörük – Piano
Gürkan Çakmak – Whistle
Volkan Öktem – Drum
Ali Yılmaz – Cümbüş & Tarcüş ^{#}
Volkan Akyüz – Side Flute
Gündem – Yaylı Sazlar ^{#}
Timur atasever – Cello
Kadir Okyay – Violin
İlyas Tetik – Lute
Mehmet Akatay & Cengiz Ercümer – Vurmalı Sazlar ^{#}
Mehmet Akatay – Percussion Vocal
Zara – Solo Vocal

Back Vocals: Işın Karaca, Selçuk Suna, Gaye Biçer, Jale Kök, Yonca Karadağ, Murat Çekem, Ekrem Düzgünoğlu & Bahadır Sağbaş (3)
# Turkish Translation

== Credits ==
Production: Seyhan Müzik
Producer: Bülent Seyhan
Producers: Işın Karaca, Akın Büyükkaraca, Erdem Yörük
Musical Director: Erdem Yörük
Production: Akın Büyükkaraca – Akış Prodüksiyon
Coordinators: Hakan Kasapoğlu, Seyfi Yerlikaya
Studio: MDM Studios
Record & Edit: Aykut Şahlanan
Drum Edits: Murat Bulut
Mix: Serkan Kula
Mastering: Ulaş Ağca (İmaj)
Photographs: Zeynel Abidin
Hair: Mehmet Emir & Turan Çakar (Select Kuför)
Make-up: Hande Kılıç
Costume: Songül Sarpbaş
Graphics: Ozan Karakoç
Press: FRS

== Music videos ==
- Mandalinalar on YouTube
- Kalp Tanrıya Emanet on YouTube
- Bırakma

== Song samples ==
Işın Karaca – Mandalinalar
Chorus of Işın Karaca's hit song from "Başka 33/3" Album

Işın Karaca – Herşeye Rağmen (33/3)
Chorus of Işın Karaca's song from "Başka 33/3" Album
