= Yonca Lodi =

- Born: Cavidan Yonca Akçakoca; 17 September 1974 (age 52); Istanbul, Turkey
- Occupations: Singer, musician
- Years active: 1998–present
- Labels: Sony (1999–2007); TMC (2007–2015); DMC (2016–)
- Spouse: Alphan Lodi (m. 1997; div. 2009)
- Children: Egehan Lodi

Cavidan Yonca Lodi (née Akçakoca; born 17 September 1974) is a Turkish pop music singer.

== Life and career ==
Cavidan Yonca Akçakoca was born in Istanbul and spent most of her childhood in Beşiktaş. She was a part of the school orchestra, and while in the second grade of high school she enrolled in the Çağdaş Music Center. She took singing, solfeggio and harmony lessons from Istanbul State Opera and Ballet soloists Mine Mater and Timur Selçuk for two years and passed the talent exam in 1992, finishing first. She continued her education at Mimar Sinan University State Conservatory Performing Arts Opera-Singing Department.

Lodi founded a music band with her friends in 1993, and later signed an album contract with Sony Music in 1996 and released her first album under her own name in May 1999. Additionally, she voiced songs for the soundtrack of a number of TV series. She later collaborated with Sezen Aksu and Aysel Gürel on her album Aşkta ve Ayrılıkta in 2001. They also worked with her on her next album Yolumu Bulurum. Songs from her fourth album Milat entered Turkey's official music chart.

== Discography ==
=== Albums ===
- 21 May 1999: Yonca Lodi
- 1 November 2001: Aşkta ve Ayrılıkta
- 29 January 2007: Yolumu Bulurum
- 7 September 2010: Milat
- 4 March 2014: 12 Ay
- 31 December 2018: Fazla Aşk

=== Singles ===
- 24 June 2008: "Yeter"
- 6 November 2009: "Emanet"
- 26 May 2011: "Tenden Tene"
- 21 March 2012: "Ton Farkı"
- 5 February 2013: "Edebiyat"
- 8 January 2016: "Özlüyorum"
- 6 June 2017: "Mühür"
- 5 June 2021: "Huzurun Rengi"
- 23 September 2022: "Yelkovan" (with Zeki Güner)

=== Music videos ===
- "Fal"
- "İnadım İnat"
- "Sana Bir Şey Olmasın"
- "Anlatma"
- "Hıçkırmalısın"
- "Sende Yaram Var"
- "Düştüysek Kalkarız"
- "Edebiyat"
- "Ton Farkı"
- "Saklanma"
- "12 Ay"
- "Hazine"
- "Hain"
- "Özlüyorum"

=== Charts ===
Album	Single	Peak
Album	Single	TR
Milat	"Düştüysek Kalkarız"	4
Milat	"Milat"	16
