= Vatan Şaşmaz =

Turkish actor

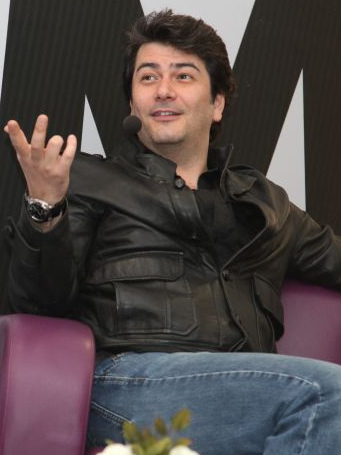
- Vatan Şaşmaz in 2012
- Born: Vatansever Şaşmaz; 8 January 1975; Istanbul, Turkey
- Died: 27 August 2017 (aged 42); Istanbul, Turkey
- Occupations: Actor, author, host
- Height: 1.85 m (6 ft 1 in)

Vatansever Şaşmaz (8 January 1975, Fatih, Istanbul – 27 August 2017, Istanbul), Turkish actor, and author.

== Early life ==
He is originally from Biga, Çanakkale. He was given the name "Homeland" by his mother because he was born on Istanbul Vatan Street. He was a photo model in his youth. He has also appeared in some commercials and clips. He has presented morning programs at ATV with Melike Öcalan for years.

== Death ==
On 27 August 2017, he was shot and killed at the age of 42 in a hotel in Istanbul.
