= Kibariye =

Turkish Arabesque-pop singer (born 1960)

- Also known as: Kibariye
- Born: Bahriye Tokmak; 10 August 1960 (age 65); Akhisar, Manisa, Turkey
- Genres: Arabesque
- Occupation: Singer
- Years active: 1974–present
- Website: www.kibariye.com.tr

Bahriye Tokmak (born 10 August 1960), better known by her stage name Kibariye, is a Turkish Arabesque-pop singer.

== Life ==
Kibariye was born Bahriye Tokmak on 10 August 1960 to a family with Romani origin, She is the daughter of Doğan and Makbule Tokmak and was born in Akhisar, Manisa. When she was born, her parents had not yet married, and her date of birth was initially recorded as 1959. In 1981, she applied to the court to correct her date of birth on registration and changed it to 1960.

In recent years, she appeared as a judge on ATV's singing competition Oryantal Star. Together with the Tepecik Philharmonic Orchestra, she performed at the 85th İzmir International Fair in 2016.

=== Personal life ===
On 21 December 1979, she married the taxi driver Tunay Ürek. The couple got divorced after a few years. In 1999, she married Ali Küçükbalçık and together they have a daughter named Birgül.

== Discography ==
=== Albums ===
- Kimbilir (1981)
- Aşkın Adresi (1982)
- Gelin Ağıtı (1982)
- İşte Kibariye (1983)
- Hayat Merdiveni (1985)
- Kibariye (1986)
- Romanika (Sabredemedim) (1986 – Harika Müzik)
- Hançer (İyimserim) (1987)
- Sevmenin Bedeli (1987)
- Avustralya Konseri (1988)
- Arabesk'in Sultanı (1989)
- En Büyük Kibariye (1989)
- Aşk Çemberi (1990)
- Benim Şarkılarım (Bayşu – MER – Raks Müzik)
- Şarkılara Hayat Veren (1990)
- Aşkın Sesi (1991 – Bayşu Müzik)
- Bir Tutkudur (1992 – Bayşu Müzik)
- Kibariye '93 (1993 – Bayşu Müzik)
- İşte Ses İşte Yorum (1993 – Bayşu Müzik)
- Kibariye Fırtınası (1994 – Tempa Müzik)
- Bir Numara (1995 – Bayşu Müzik)
- Kül Kedisi (1995 – Tempa Müzik)
- Kara Kışlar (1996 – Banko Müzik Yapım)
- Bir Duygudur Kibariye (1998 – Prestij Müzik)
- Boyun Eğmem (2000 – Prestij Müzik)
- Yeniden (2001 – Prestij Müzik)
- Ben Ayakta Ağlarım (2003 – DSM – Tek Müzik)
- Gülümse Kaderine (2006 – Avrupa Müzik)
- Koleksiyon: Bir Numara (2008)
- Anlayamazsın (2008 – Avrupa Müzik)
- 4 Mevsim (2010 – Avrupa Müzik)
- Gülü Soldurmam (2014 – Avrupa Müzik)

== Filmography ==
Year	Title	Role	Notes
1981	Kimbilir	Kibariye	
1987	Şen Sulukule	Güler	
2000	Hayatım Roman	Herself	
2002	Reyting Hamdi	'Supporting role'	TV series
2005	Çeşm-i Bülbül	Bülbül	TV series
2005	Hababam Sınıfı Üç Buçuk	Nuriye	
2023	Arka Sokaklar	Herself	
