= Esmeray =

Afro-Turkish singer (1949–2002)

- Born: Esmeray Bey; 25 February 1949; Emirgan, Istanbul, Turkey
- Died: 25 March 2002 (aged 53); Istanbul, Turkey
- Other names: Esmeray Diriker
- Occupations: Singer, actress
- Years active: 1960–2002
- Spouse: Şemi Diriker

Esmeray Diriker (25 February 1949 – 25 March 2002) was a Turkish singer of Afro-Turkish heritage. She is known for Turkish psychedelic rock music.

== Biography ==
Esmeray, who was of Afro-Turkish descent, was born on 25 February 1949, the Emirgan district of Istanbul. Her father, Nusret Bey, was a member of a Moroccan family that settled in Turkey during the Ottoman Empire, her mother Fermet Hanım is Turkish. In 1960, Esmeray dropped out of her last year of Emirgan Secondary School to join the Istanbul community theatre, and performed on stage for the first time in a children's play. She continued to perform at the Istanbul community theatre until 1965.

After that, she went on to performing at bigger, more noted theatres, beginning in Dün Gece Yolda Giderken Çok Komik Birşey Oldu (Last Night Something Really Funny Happened on the Streets) at the Dormen Theatre. She also performed in the Avni Dilligil, Özlem, Özlem Taşdelenler, and Sezer Sezin theatres. She starred in her last theatrical production in 1974 alongside Muammer Karaca in Mart Bakanı. She then moved on to cinematic productions, and the same year starred in Sev Kardeşim and Zilli Nazife, also making a guest appearance in Unutama Beni.

Esmeray started singing as an amateur in a choir produced by Neriman Altındağ Tüfekçi.

Esmeray won TRT’s (Turkish Radio and Television Corporation) Toplu Igne Composition Contest award in 1974 for the song, ‘Unutama Beni (Do Not Forget Me). She was the wife of Şemi Diriker (alias "Erol Tanır"), a Turkish composer.

She returned to the theatre at Nedim Saban theatre in 1995 with Oscar. She performed in series of Alıştık Artık with Ayşegül Atik and Ali Atik in the first half of the 1990s and Reyting Hamdi with Hamdi Alkan from the second half of the 1990s until 2002. Her final performance was in Küçük Besleme as "Şule" in 2001.

She died of lung cancer on 25 March 2002, in Acibadem, Istanbul. She is buried in Zincirlikuyu Cemetery.

== Discography ==
=== 45rpm ===
- 100 Kere 1000 Kere – Sen (1973)
- Unutama Beni – Ayrılık Olsa Bile (1974)
- Elveda Yavrularım – İlk Muhabbet (1975)
- Antalya'ya Koş – Antalya'ya Koş (Enstrümantal) (1975) (with Ali Kocatepe, İlhan İrem, Seyyal Taner and Gökben)
- Soruyor Musun? – Garip Aman (1975)
- 13, 5 – Büyümsün (1975)
- Oylum Oylum – Bir Gün Gelecek (1976)
- Gel Tezkere Gel – Yollara Düştüm (1977)
- Yollar Yollar – Lanet (1977)
- İnsanız Biz (1978) (with Ertan Anapa, Funda Anapa, İskender Doğan, Kerem Yılmazer and Melike Demirağ)

=== LPs and other albums ===
- Yayınlanamaz (1976)
- Yaz Romancı (1977)
- Oğlum (1980)
- Süpriz 81 (1981)
- Kağıt Mendil (1993)
- Eski Dostlar (2000)
- Unutama Beni (2003, after her death)
- Askerin Türküsü (2008, after her death)
