= Sibel Alaş =

Turkish pop music singer (born 1973)

- Born: 13 February 1975 (age 51); İstanbul, Turkey
- Genre: Turkish pop
- Occupations: Singer, songwriter, composer, translator
- Years active: 1995–present
- Label: Sony Music

Sibel Alaş (born 13 February 1975) is a Turkish pop music singer and translator.

== Career ==
She graduated from American Culture and Literature Department in Istanbul University. Her first hit was 'Adam' (Man) from her album of the same name in 1995. She was both the vocalist and dancer of Yonca Evcimik before starting her solo career. She released her second album, Fem (Not opened rose in Turkish or short of female in English) in 1996.

== Personal life ==
She had a break in her music career after releasing the album Çocuk ("Child" in Turkish) in 1998 due to marrying her manager Zeki Aköz in 1996, and because of her disease, aneurysm. In 1998, she adopted a two-year-old daughter named Tuğçe.

In 2005, after being diagnosed with arteriovenous malformation, Alaş underwent brain surgery. She released her fourth album, Carpe Diem ("Seize the day" in Latin) in 2006. After translating Hotel on the Corner of Bitter and Sweet to Turkish in 2008, she translated A Game of Thrones by George R. R. Martin.

== Discography ==
Albums

- Adam (1995)
- Fem (1996)
- Çocuk (1998)
- Carpe Diem (2006)

Singles

- "Herkes Gibisin" (2014)
