= Yonca Şevval Erdem =

Turkish water polo player

Personal information
- Nationality: Turkish
- Born: 3 April 1996 (age 30)
- Height: 167 cm (66 in)
- Weight: 58 kg (128 lb)

Sport
- Sport: Water polo
- Handedness: Right
- Position: Wing
- Current club: 35 Water Polo and Swimming Club
- Number: 3
National team
- Years: Team
- 2016: Turkey

Yonca Şevval Erdem (born 3 April 1996) is a Turkish water polo player, playing at the wing position. She is part of the Turkey women's national water polo team. She competed at the 2016 Women's European Water Polo Championship.

She is a member of 35 Water Polo and Swimming Club.
