= Cenk Torun =

Turkish actor (born 1974)

- Born: 24 March 1974 (age 52); Ankara, Turkey
- Education: Marmara University, Tourism and Hotel Management
- Occupation: Actor
- Years active: 1994–present
- Known for: Çılgın Bediş (1996–2001); Yeter (2015–2016); Esaret (2022–2025)
- Spouse: Nevin Ursavaş (m. 2001)
- Children: 1

Cenk Torun (born 24 March 1974) is a Turkish actor. He became known nationwide for his portrayal of Oktay in the television series Çılgın Bediş (1996–2001), which aired on Kanal D. Although he took a break from his career in the 2000s, he continued to appear on screen in minor roles. In the 2010s, he continued his career by appearing in series such as Yeter (2015–2016) and Adını Sen Koy (2018).

The son of Turkish classical music artist Nurdan Torun, Cenk Torun began acting by appearing in the music video for "Delikanlım", the title track of Yıldız Tilbe's 1994 album Delikanlım, after receiving persistent requests while studying Tourism and Hotel Management at Marmara University. After attracting attention with the music video, he received many offers. In 1995, he portrayed the character Hüp in the series Palavra Aşklar. The following year, he began portraying Oktay in the series Çılgın Bediş, adapted from Özden Öğrük's comic strip Çılgın Bediş, which was published in the 1970s. He became known nationwide through the series and became one of the most popular actors of the period. He also appeared in music videos. In the early 2000s, he appeared in series such as Benim İçin Ağlama (2001), Melekler Adası (2004–2005), and Masum Değiliz (2005). In 2022–2025, he became known to large audiences internationally through the series Esaret, in which he portrayed the character Orhun Demirhanlı.

== Life ==
Cenk Torun was born on 24 March 1974, in Ankara. His mother is Nurdan Torun, a vocalist who has been known in the field of Turkish classical music since the 1980s. From a young age, he grew up in an environment familiar with the world of the arts through his mother's profession. Nurdan Torun performed for years as a lead singer at Maksim Gazinosu; she achieved significant success in her music career by releasing the albums İlk Albüm in 1998, Aşk Hırsızı in 2002, and Her Hayat Bir Keşif in 2011, produced by Zara. His father was Enver Torun, and he also has a brother named Tolga.

Cenk Torun began his education in Ankara and moved to Istanbul for university after completing his primary and secondary education. He graduated from the Tourism and Hotel Management department at Marmara University; he also received acting training at the Müjdat Gezen Art Center, strengthening his professional foundation. His mother's fame did not provide him with any privilege; indeed, by saying in his own words, "My mother's fame did not give me an advantage," he emphasized that he climbed the career ladder entirely through his own efforts. One of the most devastating events in Cenk Torun's life was the death of his father. His father, Enver Torun, died by suicide in 2003 by jumping from the Bosphorus Bridge, while Cenk Torun was about to return from his military service. This tragic loss deeply affected the young actor.

== Career ==
The son of a family of artists, Cenk Torun began his professional career with on-camera appearances in the music industry. In 1994, he made his acting debut by appearing in the music video for the well-known song "Delikanlım", the lead single from singer Yıldız Tilbe's album Delikanlım. After receiving offers following his role in the music video, Torun turned to television series. In 1995, he portrayed the character Hüp in the series Palavra Aşklar, directed by Nursan Esenboğa and broadcast on Show TV. In the summer of 1996, he received an offer for the series Çılgın Bediş, adapted from Özden Öğrük's Çılgın Bediş comic strip published in the 1970s. Filming of the series, in which he portrayed Oktay, began in the spring. The series, in which he shared the lead with Yonca Evcimik, was followed by a wide audience, particularly young people, during its run. Along with the series, which ranked among the top-rated programs, Cenk Torun became a nationally recognized star. The series was one of the most popular youth productions of the second half of the 1990s, and Torun became one of the period's most popular leading men.

In 1996, he took part in the maxi-single Çıtır Kızlar (1996), by the music group Çıtır Kızlar, founded by Yonca Evcimik, and appeared in the music video for the song "Yaşanacaksa Yaşanacak", which was released in the summer of 1997. Cenk Torun began working as a business operator in 2000 and during this period portrayed the character Serkan in the series Benim İçin Ağlama, which starred Fatma Girik and Bulut Aras. In 2001, Çılgın Bediş began airing again on Show TV and ended shortly afterward. Subsequently, Osman Sınav offered him the role of Polat Alemdar in the series Kurtlar Vadisi (2003–2005). However, he turned down the role because he was due to perform his military service. After returning from military service, he portrayed the character Murat in several episodes of the series Melekler Adası. He subsequently appeared in the television film Hepimiz Kardeşiz on TRT 1. In 2005, he appeared in minor roles in series such as Büyük Günahlar, Köpek, and Masum Değiliz. During this period, he took a break from his career and appeared in productions in minor roles.

In 2008, he appeared in the television film Fadik İntikam Peşinde, broadcast on Kanal 7. Until the middle of the 2010s, he appeared sporadically in television films and series in minor roles. He returned to his career with the series Yeter, which began airing on atv on the last day of 2015. The series, in which he portrayed the character Gökhan, ran for two seasons. In 2018, he portrayed the character Oğuz Kervancıoğlu in the second and third seasons of the series Adını Sen Koy. Between 2022 and 2025, Torun starred in the series Esaret, broadcast on Kanal 7, portraying the character Orhun Demirhanlı. Through the series, he began to gain international recognition and reached a fan base in many countries around the world.

== Personal life ==
Cenk Torun preferred to keep his private life out of the public eye for a long time. In 2001, he married Nevin Ursavaş, with whom he had been in a long-term relationship. His wife, Nevin, is not a public figure and began using the name Nevin Torun after their marriage. The couple have a son named Şan.

== Filmography ==
=== Film ===
Year	Title	Role	Director(s)	Notes
2005	Hepimiz Kardeşiz		Ülkü Erakalın	TV film
2008	Fadik İntikam Peşinde	Kadir	Erhan Tursun	TV film
2012	N'apcaz Şimdi?	Trafik polisi	Özgür Özberk	
2016	Hazan	Ozan	Banu Kaptanoğulları	TV film
2016	Şeytanın Çocukları: El Ebyaz	Yaşar Kaptan	Oya Köksal, Vedat Dikmetaş	

=== Television ===
Year	Title	Role(s)	Network	Notes
1995	Palavra Aşklar	Hüp	Show TV	First television series / Comedy series / Ran for 8 episodes / Appeared in the series from episode 1 through episode 8
1996–2001	Çılgın Bediş	Oktay	Kanal D, Show TV	Lead role / Comedy series / Ran for 70 episodes / Appeared as a lead in the series from episode 1 through episode 70
2000–2001	Benim İçin Ağlama	Serkan	TGRT	Lead role / Drama series / Ran for 35 episodes / Appeared in the series as a lead from episode 1 through episode 35
2004-2005	Melekler Adası	Murat	atv	Supporting role / Drama series / Ran for 76 episodes
2005	Büyük Günahlar	Vedat	Kanal 7	Lead role / Daily series
2005	Köpek	Erdinç	atv	Guest role / Drama series / Ran for 15 episodes / Appeared as a guest actor in 5 episodes, from episode 11 through episode 15
2005	Masum Değiliz	Süha	Kanal D	Guest role / Drama series / Ran for 6 episodes / Appeared as a guest actor only in episode 1
2006	Arka Sokaklar	Erkan Yıldız	Kanal D	Episode actor
2007	Gemilerde Talim Var	Cem	atv	Lead role / Comedy series / Ran for 4 episodes / Appeared in the series from episode 1 through episode 4
2007	Hırçın Kız		FOX	Mini series
2007–2010	Ölümsüz Kahramanlar	Soldier	Samanyolu TV	Season 1 and Season 2
2015	Ne Münasebet	Nihat	Show TV	Guest role / Comedy series / Ran for 11 episodes / Appeared as a guest actor in episode 8
2016	Yeter	Psychologist Gökhan	atv	Supporting role / Drama series / Ran for 40 episodes / Appeared in the series from episode 10 through episode 40
2018	Adını Sen Koy	Oğuz Kervancıoğlu	Star TV, TV8	Lead role / Seasons 3 and 4 / Daily series
2022–2025	Esaret	Orhun Demirhanlı	Kanal 7	Lead role / Daily series

=== Music videos ===
Title	Year	Artist(s)
"Delikanlım"	1994	Yıldız Tilbe
"Yaşanacaksa Yaşanacak"	1997	Çıtır Kızlar
