= Neden =

Neden may refer to:

- Neden (Candan Erçetin album), a 2002 album by Candan Erçetin
- Neden (İbrahim Tatlıses album), a 2008 album by İbrahim Tatlıses
- Neden?, a 2009 Turkish TV news show presented by Can Dündar
