= Yaşım Çocuk =

Studio album by Mabel Matiz
- Released: 5 January 2013 (Turkey)
- Recorded: August–December 2012
- Genre: Rock
- Length: 45:37
- Producer: Doğan Music Company

Mabel Matiz chronology
Mabel Matiz (2011)	Yaşım Çocuk (2013)	Gök Nerede (2015)

Singles from Yaşım Çocuk
- 1. "Zor Değil" Released: 19 February 2013; 2. "Aşk Yok Olmaktır" Released: 16 August 2013; 3. "Yaşım Çocuk" Released: 21 April 2014; 4. "Alaimisema" Released: 8 July 2014

Yaşım Çocuk is Turkish pop and rock singer Mabel Matiz's second studio album, which was released on 5 January 2013 in Turkey. Album was published in Turkey.

== Track listing ==
No.	Title	Writer(s)	Composer (s)	Length
1.	"Krallar"	Mabel Matiz	Mabel Matiz	3:43
2.	"Yaşım Çocuk"	Mabel Matiz	Mabel Matiz	3:36
3.	"Yıllar Saçlarına"	Mabel Matiz	Mabel Matiz	4:58
4.	"Zor Değil"	Mete Özgencil	Mabel Matiz · Mete Özgencil	4:32
5.	"Aşk Yok Olmaktır"	Yıldız Tilbe	Yıldız Tilbe	3:44
6.	"Alaimisema"	Mabel Matiz	Mabel Matiz	3:10
7.	"Tamburu Yokuştan"	Mabel Matiz	Can Güngör · Mabel Matiz	3:01
8.	"Aldanıyor"	Mabel Matiz	Mabel Matiz	3:41
9.	"Sefil Çıplak Korkusuz"	Mabel Matiz	Mabel Matiz	3:48
10.	"Kerem Gibi"	Mabel Matiz	Mabel Matiz	4:22
11.	"Ölü Pantolon"	Mabel Matiz	Mabel Matiz	2:58
12.	"Ah Bu Sefer"	Mabel Matiz	Mabel Matiz	4:08
Total length:				45:37
