= Soykan =

Turkish surname

Soykan is a Turkish surname and male given name formed by the combination of the Turkish words soy ("strain; race, lineage, ancestry") and kan ("blood"). kan could possibly be a corruption of han ("khan, ruler") which would make the meaning "noble ruler". Notable people with the name include:

- Ebru Soykan (1981–2009), Turkish civil rights activist
- Ömer Naci Soykan (1945–2017), Turkish philosopher
- Pınar Soykan (born 1980), Turkish singer
