= Ertem =

Ertem is both a Turkish surname and a given name. Notable people with the name include:

- Ceylan Ertem (born 1980), Turkish singer-songwriter
- Ertem Eğilmez (1929–1989), Turkish film director, producer, and screenwriter
