= Tilbe =

- Gender: Feminine
- Language: Turkish

Origin
- Language: Turkish
- Meaning: Alert, meticulous

Other names
- Variant forms: Tilbenur, Tilbehan, Tilbesu, Tilve

Tilbe is a feminine Turkish given name of Turkish origin which is also used as a surname. In Turkish, Tilbe means "alert, meticulous". Usage of the name increased around 1994 due to the influence of the singer Yıldız Tilbe (born 1966). Notable people with the name include:

== Given name ==
- Tilbe Saran (born 1961), Turkish actress
- Tilbe Şenyürek (born 1995), Turkish female basketball player

== Surname ==
- Yıldız Tilbe (born 1966), Turkish singer of Kurdish-Zaza descent
