= Pablo Held =

German jazz pianist and composer (born 1986)

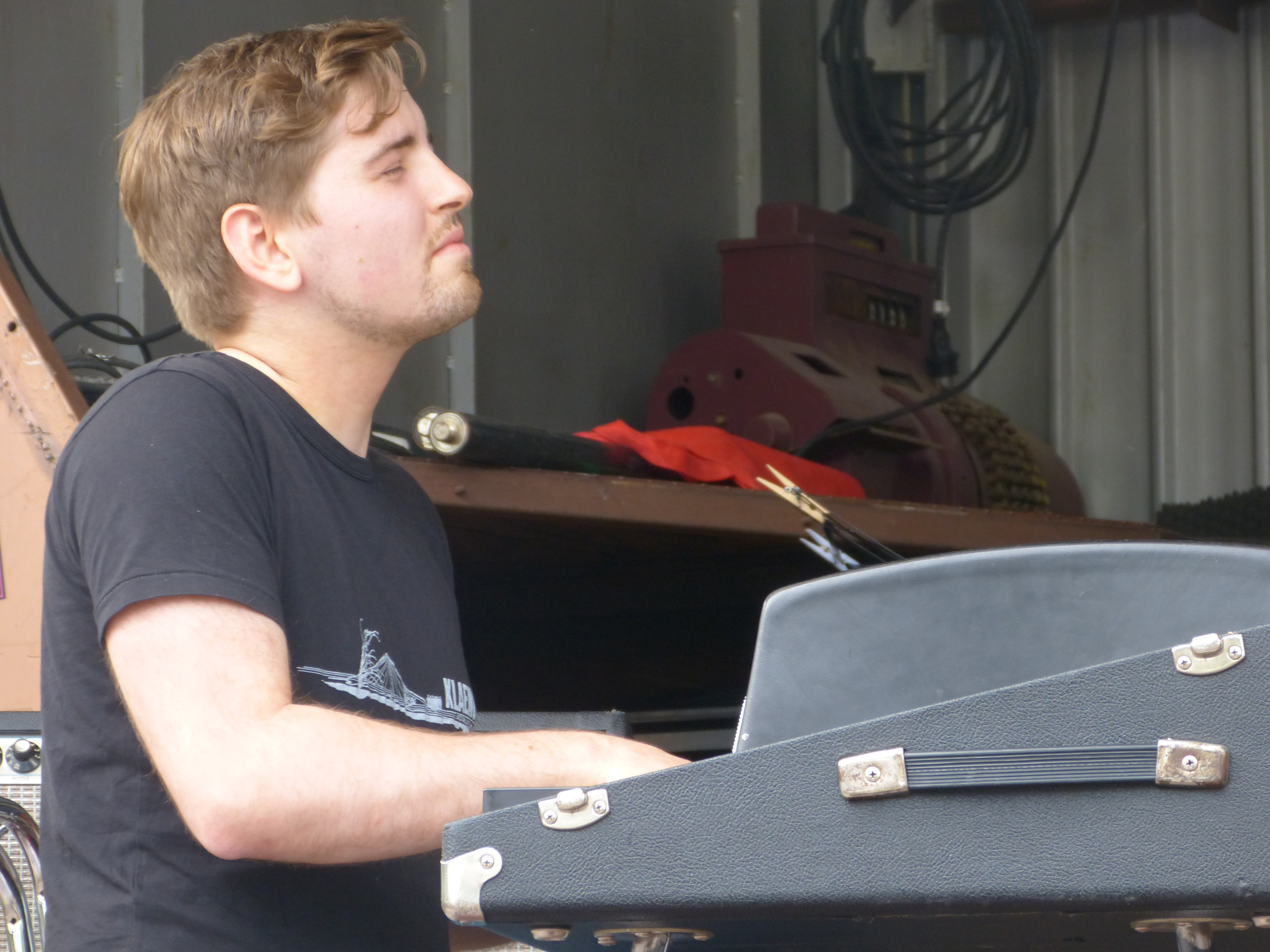
- Held at the KLAENG Festival, 22 June 2013

Background information
- Born: 27 December 1986 (age 39)
- Genres: Jazz
- Occupations: Musician, composer
- Instrument: Piano
- Years active: 2000s–present
- Label: Pirouet
- Website: pabloheld.com

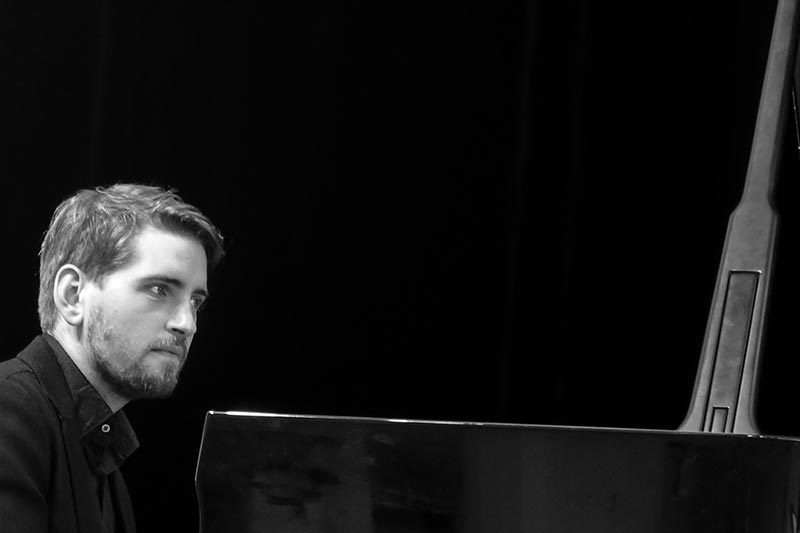
Pablo Held in Aarhus, Denmark 2017

Pablo Held (born 27 December 1986) is a German jazz pianist and composer.

== Life and career ==
Held was born on 27 December 1986. He is from Hagen. His father played the piano and introduced him to the music of Federico Mompou. Held was also influenced and taught by pianist John Taylor. Held won the WDR Improvisation Prize in 2011.

Parts of a concert with guitarist John Scofield in Cologne in January 2014 were released as The Trio Meets John Scofield.

Held's album Recondita Armonia was reviewed by Down Beat: "Held puts an individual spin on the typical ballad album by drawing on all classical themes."

== Playing and composing style ==
Pianist Kit Downes observed that Held "has developed a way of performing with his trio where all 3 of them know each others parts for every tune – so anyone can cue any part of any tune by just playing a small part of it (even if it's in the middle of another tune) – so that they then seamlessly link in other material to the mix".

== Discography ==
An asterisk (*) indicates that the year is that of release.

=== As leader/co-leader ===
Year recorded	Title	Label	Personnel/Notes
2007	Forest of Oblivion	Pirouet	Trio, with Robert Landfermann (bass), Jonas Burgwinkel (drums)
2009	Music	Pirouet	Trio, with Robert Landfermann (bass), Jonas Burgwinkel (drums)
2010	Glow	Pirouet	Ten-piece band, with Sebastian Gille (tenor sax, soprano sax), Niels Klein (tenor sax, soprano sax, bass clarinet), Menzel Mutzke (trumpet), Kathrin Pechlof (harp), Hubert Nuss (celesta, harmonium), Henning Sieverts (bass, cello), Dietmar Fuhr and Robert Landfermann (bass), Jonas Burgwinkel (drums)
2012	Live	Pirouet	Trio, with Robert Landfermann (bass), Jonas Burgwinkel (drums); in concert
2013	Elders	Pirouet	Sextet, with Jason Seizer (tenor sax), Domenic Landolf (alto flute), Ronny Graupe (guitar), Robert Landfermann (bass), Jonas Burgwinkel (drums)
2014	The Trio Meets John Scofield	Pirouet	Quartet, with John Scofield (guitar), Robert Landfermann (bass), Jonas Burgwinkel (drums); in concert
2015*	Recondita Armonia	Pirouet	Trio, with Robert Landfermann (bass), Jonas Burgwinkel (drums)
2016?	Lineage	Pirouet	Trio, with Robert Landfermann (bass), Jonas Burgwinkel (drums)
2017*	Glow II	Pirouet	With Niels Klein (saxes, clarinet), Philipp Gropper (tenor sax), Claus Stötter (trumpet), Ronny Graupe (guitar), Hubert Nuss (harmonium, celeste, pocket organ), Henning Sieverts and Robert Landfermann (bass), Jonas Burgwinkel (drums), Christian Weidner (alto sax), John Schröder (guitar); some tracks in concert
2017	Investigations	Edition	Trio, with Robert Landfermann (bass), Jonas Burgwinkel (drums)
2019	Ascent	Edition	Most tracks quartet, with Nelson Veras (guitar), Robert Landfermann (bass), Jonas Burgwinkel (drums); one track quintet, with Jeremy Viner (clarinet) added; one track sextet, with Veronika Morscher (vocals) added
2019	Descent	Edition	Quartet, with Nelson Veras (guitar), Robert Landfermann (bass), Jonas Burgwinkel (drums)
2020–21	Embracing You	Hopalit	Solo, Pablo Held plays piano, celesta, mellotron & synthesizers
2021	Adventures	Hopalit	With Nelson Veras (guitar), Robert Landfermann (bass), Jonas Burgwinkel (drums), EOS Chamber Orchestra conducted by Susanne Blumenthal
2021	Buoyancy	Hopalit	Quartet, with Percy Pursglove (trumpet, flugelhorn), Kit Downes (organ), Leif Burger (drums)
2022*	Meet Me at the Loft	Hopalit	Various, recorded live at LOFT Köln during the "Pablo Held Meets" concert series
2022	Who We Are	Hopalit	Trio, with Robert Landfermann (bass), Jonas Burgwinkel (drums)
2023	Trio Plays Standards	Hopalit	Trio, with Robert Landfermann (bass), Jonas Burgwinkel (drums)
2023	Unity	Hopalit	Quartet, with Nelson Veras (guitar), Robert Landfermann (bass), Jonas Burgwinkel (drums)

=== As sideman ===
Year recorded	Leader	Title	Label
2012*	Sebastian Gille	Anthem	Pirouet
2013*	Bastian Stein	Diegesis	Pirouet
2013	Niels Klein	Loom	Klaeng
2014*	Jason Seizer	Cinema Paradiso	Pirouet
2016*	Peter Weiss	The Good View	Jazzsick
2016*	Oliver Lutz	Poolparty	Klaeng

== Gallery ==
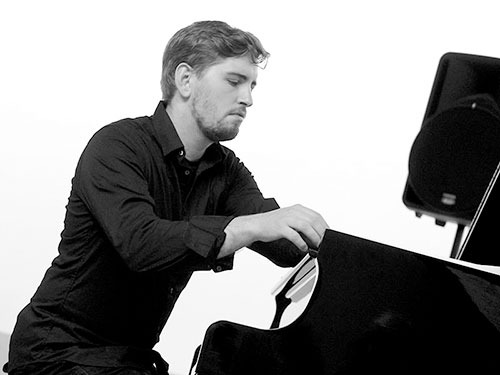
Held at the Aarhus Jazz Festival, Denmark, 2014
