= Sevdiğime Hiç Pişman Olmadım =

EP by Yıldız Tilbe
- Released: 30 July 2004
- Genre: Pop
- Length: 22:35
- Language: Turkish
- Label: Avrupa Müzik

Yıldız Tilbe chronology
Yıldız'dan Türküler (2004)	Sevdiğime Hiç Pişman Olmadım (2004)	Papatya Baharı (2005)

Sevdiğime Hiç Pişman Olmadım (English: Never Regretted Loving You) is the ninth album by Yıldız Tilbe.

== About the album ==
The album was released by Avrupa Müzik in 2004. Together with the remixed versions, the album contains 6 songs in total. Two remixed versions of "Sevdiğime Hiç Pişman Olmadım" and one remixed version of "Değerini Bilmek Gerekir Aşkın" were included in the album. The songs "Sevdiğime Hiç Pişman Olmadım" and "Değerini Bilmek Gerekir Aşkın" were eventually turned into music videos. The lyrics for "Değerini Bilmek Gerekir Aşkın" belong to the Chilean poet Pablo Neruda, which were translated into Turkish by Yıldız Tilbe herself.

Until the end of 2006 Tilbe worked with Avrupa Müzik before signing a new contract with Erol Köse. Her last two albums with Avrupa Müzik were both commercial successes, making Köse pay Tilbe 1,200,000 dollars to transfer her into his company.

Although it was announced that Tilbe had translated one of Pablo Neruda's poems for her song "Değerini Bilmek Gerekir Aşkın", Ataol Behramoğlu filed a case against her in the court arguing that the Turkish translation of the poem actually belonged to him and that she had not acquired legal permission to use it. Behramoğlu asked that it'd be mentioned by Tilbe that the poem was written Stepan Sçipaçyov, and that it was translated into Turkish by Behramoğlu. Nevertheless, Tilbe wrote on the album cover that the poem belonged to Pablo Neruda. Meanwhile, Ataoğlu continued to argue that he was the only person who had the rights to publish Sçipaçyov's work in Turkey.

Sevdiğime Hiç Pişman Olmadım broke sales records inside Turkey, and together with Yıldız'dan Türküler, became one of Tilbe's best-selling albums. It sold more than 300,000 copies. The album was awarded by MÜ-YAP as one of the best-selling albums in the branch of "Local Artist Album and Music Production Company".

== Track listing ==
1. "Sevdiğime Hiç Pişman Olmadım" (Lyrics - Music: Yıldız Tilbe - Arrangement: Ozan Doğulu)
2. "Değerini Bilmek Gerekir Aşkın" (Lyrics: Pablo Neruda - Music: Yıldız Tilbe - Arrangement: Selim Çaldıran)
3. "Ne Var Ne Yoksun" (Lyrics - Music: Yıldız Tilbe - Arrangement: Selim Çaldıran)
4. "Sevdiğime Hiç Pişman Olmadım" (Lyrics - Music: Yıldız Tilbe - Arrangement: Selim Çaldıran)
5. "Değerini Bilmek Gerekir Aşkın" (Lyrics: Pablo Neruda - Music: Yıldız Tilbe - Arrangement: Ozan Doğulu)
6. "Sevdiğime Hiç Pişman Olmadım" (Lyrics - Music: Yıldız Tilbe - Arrangement: Özgür Yedievli)

== Music videos ==
- Değerini Bilmek Gerekir Aşkın
- Sevdiğime Hiç Pişman Olmadım

== Release history ==
Country	Date	Format(s)	Label
Turkey	30 July 2004	CD, cassette	Avrupa Müzik
