= Aşk İnsanı Değiştirir =

Studio album by Yıldız Tilbe
- Released: 20 May 2009
- Genres: Arabesque, türkü
- Length: 1:47:17
- Label: Seyhan Müzik

Yıldız Tilbe chronology
Güzel (2008)	Aşk İnsanı Değiştirir (2009)	Hastayım Sana (2010)

Aşk İnsanı Değiştirir (English: Love Changes Human), is the thirteenth album of Turkish singer Yıldız Tilbe. The album was released on 20 May 2009. The album includes total of 23 songs on 2 CDs. Styles of the songs are in arabesque predominantly. In the album were pulled video clip for songs Anma Arkadaş and Ben Bir Karar Verdim.

== Track listing ==
First CD:

- 01 Anma Arkadaş – (Do Not Make Mention of She) – (Lyrics & Music: Selahattin Sarıkaya)
- 02 Aşk Bence Sen Demektir – (Love In My Opinion Means "You") – (Lyrics & Music: Özer Şenay)
- 03 Bal mısın Şeker misin? – (Are You Honey Or Sugar?) – (Lyrics & Music: Sait Ergenç)
- 04 Ben Bir Karar Verdim – (I Decided One) – (Lyrics & Music: Yıldız Tilbe)
- 05 Salındı Bahçeye Girdim – (He Oscillated, I Went Into Garden) – (Lyrics: Arif Sağ / Music: Anonymous)
- 06 Seni Sevmek İstemiştim – (I Had Wanted To Love You) – (Lyrics & Music: Yıldız Tilbe)
- 07 Yaşamak Seninle Güzel – (To Live is Nice With You) – (Lyrics & Music: Selahattin Cesur)
- 08 Ağla Yüreğim – (Cry My Heart) – (Lyrics & Music: Yıldız Tilbe)
- 09 Al Gönlünü Ondan – (Take From She Your Heart) – (Lyrics & Music: Ali Erköse)
- 10 Gözleri Kara Sevgilim – (My Darling Her Black-Eyes) – (Lyrics & Music: Yıldız Tilbe)
- 11 Geleceyem – (I Will Go) – (Lyrics & Music: Anonymous)
- 12 Gayri Dayanamam – (I No Longer Can Not Stand) – (Lyrics & Music: Anonymous)

Second CD:

- 13 Üstüme Düşme Benim – (Don Not Fall Over Backwards To Do Me) – (Lyrics: Halit Çelikoğlu / Music: Atilla Alpsakarya)
- 14 Tanrı'dan Diledim – (I Wished From The God) – (Lyrics & Music: Anonymous)
- 15 Aşkın Cehennem Olsa – (Although Your Love is Hell) – (Lyrics: Salih Korkmaz / Music: Atilla Alpsakarya)
- 16 Dudaklarında Arzu – (In Your Lips Are Desire) – (Lyrics: Sevim Ozhan / Music: Saadettin Öktenay)
- 17 Bir Tek Düşüncem – (My Reasoning Only) – (Lyrics & Music: Adnan Varveren)
- 18 Kim Bilir Şimdi Neredesin? – (Who Knows Where You Now?) – (Lyrics & Music: Seyfi Doğanay)
- 19 Karahisar Kalesi – (Karahisar Castle) – (Lyrics & Music: Anonymous)
- 20 Kara Sevda – (Blind Love) – (Lyrics & Music: A. Nail Baysu)
- 21 Bülbül Havalanmış – (Nightingale Has Been Aired) – (Lyrics & Music: Anonymous)
- 22 Aşk İnsanı Değiştirir – (Love Changes Human) – (Lyrics & Music: Yıldız Tilbe)
- 23 Hata Benim – (The Mistake Is Mine) – (Lyrics & Music: Neşet Ertaş)

== Charts ==
Chart (2009)	Peak position
D&R Best-Selling Fantasy albums	3
Hepsiburada.com Best-Selling	16
Seyhan Müzik Top 20	6
