= Yıldız Tilbe =

Turkish singer (born 1966)

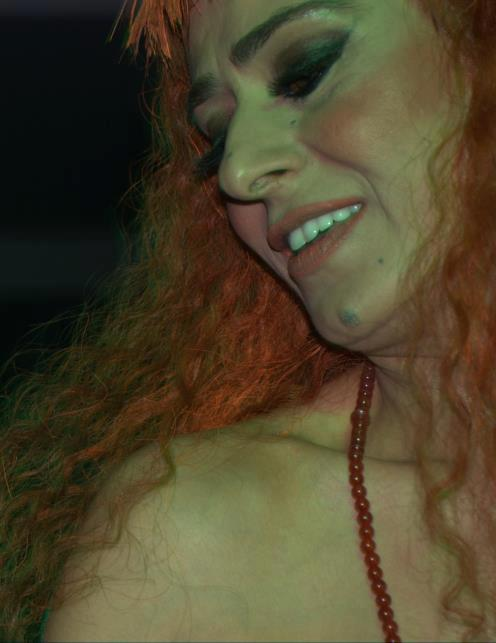
- Tilbe performing at a concert in Istanbul, July 2014
- Born: 16 July 1966 (age 60); Konak, İzmir, Turkey
- Occupation: Singer-songwriter
- Spouse: Güngör Karahan (m. 1984; div. 1989)
- Children: 1
- Musical career
- Genres: Pop; arabesque; fantasy; Turkish folk
- Instrument: Bağlama
- Years active: 1991–present
- Labels: Tempa & Foneks; İdobay; Avrupa; Erol Köse; Seyhan; Barış; Özdemir
- Website: www.yildiztilbe.com.tr

Yıldız Tilbe (born 16 July 1966) is a Turkish singer and one of the best-selling musical artists in Turkey, known especially for her eastern-infused ballads.

== Life and career ==
Yıldız Tilbe was born in the Gültepe district of Konak, İzmir, and is of Kurdish origin. She is the youngest of her parents' six children. She was known by the nickname "Yadigar" within her family. Her mother Altun was from Tunceli, while her father Ali was from Ağrı. Her father Ali Tilbe was a seasonal worker. She attended the Mustafa Rahmi Balaban School, but left after the second grade, and started singing from an early age. At the age of 18, she married Güngör Karahan. From this marriage she has a daughter, named Sezen Burçin. After five years the couple divorced. She then started singing in various nightclubs in İzmir.

She began her career in 1990 in a nightclub owned by Cengiz Özşeker. While performing at the nightclub in 1991, she met Sezen Aksu, who asked Tilbe to become her backing vocalist. After accepting her offer, Tilbe moved to Istanbul and worked for Sezen Aksu for a while. After parting her way from Aksu, Tilbe started performing at Istanbul's nightclubs. She subsequently got an offer from Cem Özer to perform as a soloist in the program Laf Lafı Açıyor. With her appearance on this show, she became famous and released her first album, Delikanlım, in 1994, which became a hit in Turkey. In addition to her singing career, she started songwriting. In her songs, she addresses subjects such as sadness, love and separation and primarily uses romantic themes in her songs and compositions. In her romantic songs, she uses an imaginative and powerful language. Tilbe has composed many songs for several other artists and collaborated with them on their music projects. About her songs Tilbe said:

"My songs do not just tell my story, they tell everybody's story. That is why people listen to them. There is Yıldız who sings these songs, and there is someone who listens to them. I can not even listen to some of my songs because they are really painful. Also I'm a person who has something to say not only in those songs but in other ways. I'm not a person limited to just about 40 songs..."

In 1996, the anti-narcotics police found some cannabis at her house. Tilbe was held in custody and was released after three days. To get rid of her addiction to cannabis, she was hospitalized at Balıklı Greek Hospital for a while. In the same year, she released her new album, Aşkperest. In the late 1990s, she worked at various nightclubs in Istanbul, Bursa and Eskişehir. In 2001, the release of her new album Gülüm brought her back to the stardom, which was followed by the album Haberi Olsun in 2002. In 2003, all of the songs on her album Yürü Anca Gidersin became hits in Turkey. Throughout her career, she has won many awards and received various nominations.

In 2004, Tilbe was diagnosed with uterine cancer and underwent surgery and treatment at Hacettepe University Medical School. Tilbe has related her illness to the personal issues she was dealing with at the time and said:

I did not say this to anyone except my family. Fortunately, I had a child before. Otherwise, this issue could tear me up. I had a great love in my life during that period of time, I was deeply in love. I was just thinking about him. He was constantly on my mind. When a person is in pain, it could actually be a problem in her body. I completely forgot him after my illness was over. Now I know that everything is not worth hanging around, and I learned that I should not feel despaired for unnecessary things.

Once she received a marriage offer from Azer Bülbül but she did not accept his proposal.

== Controversies ==
After the 2006 Israeli airstrike on Lebanon, during a television appearance Tilbe said "May God bring down one disaster after another upon Israel," to which the studio audience answered "Amen." In response to Israeli airstrikes on Gaza in early July 2014, Tilbe is reported to have said on social media site Twitter: "God bless Hitler, it was even too few what he did to the Jews, he was right" and "The Jews will be destroyed by Muslims, in the name of Allah, not much time left for it to be done". Her tweets received support from Melih Gökçek, the mayor of Ankara, who is a member of the ruling Justice and Development Party and himself a controversial figure. Later she tweeted that did not mean to praise Hitler and that she also has some Jewish friends and acquaintances.

Yıldız Tilbe, who was a guest on the İbo Show music program broadcast on the Turkish channel ATV in 2009, got angry and reacted when her song was interrupted by Turkish singer and the program's presenter İbrahim Tatlıses. Tatlıses found Tilbe's behavior disrespectful, reminding her that "I saved you from the pimps." This further caused tension between them and Tilbe left the program.

During an interview in 2012 she called a journalist bitch for which she later went on trial.

== Discography ==
=== Studio albums ===
Year	Title (Turkish)	Title (English)	Sales	Source
1994	Delikanlım	My Boy	600,000+	
1995	Dillere Destan	A Legendary Story		
1996	Aşkperest	Love Obsessed		
1998	Salla Gitsin Dertlerini	Let Your Worries Go		
2001	Gülüm	My Rose		
2002	Haberi Olsun	Let Him Know	2,000,000	
2003	Yürü Anca Gidersin	Go, You'll Barely Reach It	2,500,000	
2004	Yıldız'dan Türküler	Folk Songs From Yıldız	650.000+	
2005	Papatya Baharı	Camomile Spring	300,000	
2008	Güzel	Beautiful	123,000	
2009	Aşk İnsanı Değiştirir	Love Changes a Person	100,000	
2010	Hastayım Sana	Crazy for You	100,000	
2011	Oynama	Do Not Play		
2013	Yeniden Eskiler. Arabesk	Again Oldies. Arabesque	26,500	Müzik Onair
2014	Şivesi Sensin Aşkın	You're the Accent of Love	23,000	Müzik Onair
2016	Oynat	Play		
2018	Bir Seni Tanırım	I Just Know You		
2018	Kış Gülleri	Winter Roses		
2020	Seninle Derdim Çok	I Have a Lot of Trouble with You		

=== Live albums ===
Year	Title (Turkish)	Title (English)	Sales	Source
2022	Yıldız Tilbe Harbiye Konseri, Vol. 1	Yıldız Tilbe Harbiye Concert, Vol. 1		
2022	Yıldız Tilbe Harbiye Konseri, Vol. 2	Yıldız Tilbe Harbiye Concert, Vol. 2		

=== EPs ===
Year	Title (Turkish)	Title (English)	Sales	Source
2004	Sevdiğime Hiç Pişman Olmadım	Never Regretted Loving You	380,000	
2006	Tanıdım Seni	Now I Know You	150,000	
2015	Yıldız Tilbe 2015	Yıldız Tilbe 2015		
2017	Sevgililer Günü	Valentine's Day		
2024	Ben Bir Şarkıyım	I'm a Song		

=== Singles ===
Year	Title (Turkish)	Title (English)	Notes	Source
2013	"Sana Kalbim Geçti"	My Heart's Passed on You		
2017	"Ruh-i Revanım"	My Flowing Spirit		
2018	"Bir Seni Tanırım"	I Just Know You		
2018	"Bizim Oralar" (feat. Çetin Çeto)	Our Place		
2019	"Sen Aşıksın Bana"	You're in Love with Me		
2019	"Sen Aşk mısın Sevda mısın?"	Are you Love or Passion?		
2019	"O Benim Aslanım"	He's My Lion		
2019	"Arayacaksın Ayrılınca"	You'll Look for Me when We Break Up		
2019	"Seviyor musun?"	Do You Love?		
2019	"Kırmızı Koltuğumda"	On My Red Chair		
2019	"İstiyorken Ağlıyorum"	I Cry When I Want		
2019	"Abur Cubur Yemem"	I Don't Eat Junk Food		
2019	"Hikaye"	Story		
2020	"O Kız"	That Girl		
2020	"Seninle Derdim Çok"	I Have a Lot of Trouble with You		
2021	"Peşindeyim Koşa Koşa"	I'm After You Eagerly		
2022	"Kendimi Çağırıyorum"	I Call Myself		
2022	"Yaşa ve Gör" (feat. RamZan)	Live and See		
2022	"Birden Çıksan Karşıma"	If You Suddenly Appear before Me		
2022	"Firari" (with Oğuz Yılmaz)	Runaway		
2023	"Kapat Şu Perdeyi"	Close That Curtain		
2023	"Na Nura Ne"			
2023	"Ağlamam Gülersen"	I Won't Cry If You Laugh		
2023	"Dizine Dursun"			
2023	"Bambaşka Yollara" (with Burak Bulut)	On Different Paths		
2024	"Kalbimden Çıkmıyorsun"	You Don't Leave My Heart		
2024	"Bayılıyorum"	I Love It		
2024	"Ben Seninle Mutluyum" (with Halodayı)	I'm Happy with You		
2024	"Bakınca Görünüyorsun"	You're Seen When I Look		
2024	"Ben mi Aşk mı"	Me or Love?		
2024	"O Zaman"	Then		
2024	"Bırakma Beni" (with Metin Şentürk)	Don't Leave Me		
2024	"Canım Benim" (with Çılgın Sedat)	My Darling		
2024	"Yakın Arkadaş"	Close Friend		
2024	"Hepsi Aşktan"	All Due to Love		
2024	"Aşkımın Yanlışı"	My Love's Mistake		
2025	"Senden Başka Bir Şey Bulamam" (with Zeyd)	Can't Find Anything Other than You		
2025	"Hep mi Eyvallah"	Always Thankful		
2025	"Hiç Vermicem"	Won't Ever Give It Up		
2025	"Belli mi Olur"	You Never Know		
2025	"Sana Aşk Olsun"	Shame On You		
2025	"Aynı Değil Mi"	Isn't It the Same		
2025	"Sevmek Çok Güzel"	Love Is Very Beautiful		
2025	"Seviyordum Sizi"	I Loved You		
2025	"Aşka Doyamadığım"	I Can't Get Enough of Love		

As featured artist

Year	Song	Project	Notes
2011	"Susma"	İffet (TV series)	Performed by Tilbe and used as a background music in the series.
2012	"Bir Daha Dokunma"	Eve Düşen Yıldırım (TV series)	Tilbe performed this song for the first season finale of the series.
2012	"Aşkımı Sakla"	Orhan Gencebay ile Bir Ömür	An album marking the 60th anniversary of Orhan Gencebay's career.
2013	"Gayrı Dayanamam"	Baba Şarkılar	An album in tribute to Müslüm Gürses
2014	"Lütuf Mucize"	Non-album single	Performed by Mert Kayıkçıoğlu, featuring Tilbe
2017	"Ağla Gönlüm"	Non-album single	Performed by Toprak, featuring Tilbe
2019	"Yana Yana"	Non-album single	Performed by Murat Başaran, featuring Tilbe
2019	"Korktum Deseydin"	King of İstanbul	Written and composed by Serdar Ayyıldız, featuring Tilbe
2019	"Mutluluğun Bedeli"	Fikret Şeneş Şarkıları	An album in tribute to Fikret Şeneş
2020	"Hasbelkader"	Non-album single	Written and composed by Bilal Sonses, featuring Tilbe
2022	"Böyle Halim"	Non-album single	Performed by Hakan Taşıyan and Tilbe, written and composed by Tilbe
2022	"Bugün Ben Şahımı Gördüm"	Musa Eroğlu ile Bir Asır 2	
2023	"Bi' Tek Ben Anlarım"	Non-album single	Performed by KÖFN, featuring Tilbe
2024	"Yalnızlık Eski Bir Ustadır"	Bülent Özdemir Şarkıları	
2024	"Bu Delikanlıyı Unutamazsın"	Non-album single	Performed by Rober Hatemo, featuring Tilbe

== Contributions ==
Year	Song	Artist	Album	Songwriter	Composer
1994	"Kış Güneşi"	Tarkan	Aacayipsin	Yıldız Tilbe	Nurhat Şensesli
1994	"Anlamak İçin"	Naşide Göktürk	Yüreğim Rehin	Yıldız Tilbe	Yıldız Tilbe
1994	"Anne"	Naşide Göktürk	Yüreğim Rehin	Yıldız Tilbe	Naşide Göktürk
1994	"Bir Kereden Hiçbir Şey Olmaz"	Kenan Doğulu	Sımsıkı Sıkı Sıkı	Yıldız Tilbe, Kenan Doğulu	Ozan Doğulu
1995	"Dokunuver"	Yonca Evcimik	I'm Hot For You	Yıldız Tilbe	Yıldız Tilbe
1995	"Sürgün"	Yeşim Salkım	Ferman	Yıldız Tilbe	Yıldız Tilbe
1995	"Elveda Dedin"	Bendeniz	Bendeniz II	Yıldız Tilbe	Bendeniz
1995	"Gece Ay Şahit"	Sibel Sezal	Gizli Bahçe	Yıldız Tilbe	Zafer Çebi
1995	"İzinli Hırsızım"	Aydın	Aydın Havası	Yıldız Tilbe	Yıldız Tilbe
1996	"Kop Gel Günahlarından"	Deniz Seki	Hiç Kimse Değilim	Yıldız Tilbe	Yıldız Tilbe
1996	"Destur Çek"	Deniz Seki	Hiç Kimse Değilim	Yıldız Tilbe	Yıldız Tilbe, Bülent Özdemir
1996	"Hiç Kimse Değilim"	Deniz Seki	Hiç Kimse Değilim	Yıldız Tilbe	Yıldız Tilbe
1996	"Bozuyorum Yeminimi"	Hazal, Yıldız Tilbe	Sevdalım	Yıldız Tilbe	Bülent Özdemir
1996	"Sensiz Olamam"	Fatih Erkoç	Kardelen	Yıldız Tilbe	Yıldız Tilbe
1996	"Kardelen"	Fatih Erkoç	Kardelen	Yıldız Tilbe	Yıldız Tilbe
1997	"Bir Benim Ol"	Aşkın Nur Yengi	Haberci	Yıldız Tilbe, Aşkın Nur Yengi	Yıldız Tilbe, Aşkın Nur Yengi, İskender Paydaş
1997	"Umut Kaldı Yarına"	Deniz Erdoğan	Daha Çok Var	Yıldız Tilbe	Yıldız Tilbe
1998	"Anam"	İbrahim Tatlıses	At Gitsin	Yıldız Tilbe	Yıldız Tilbe
1998	"Sen Farklısın"	Rober Hatemo	Sen Farklısın	Yıldız Tilbe	Yıldız Tilbe
1999	"Sat Beni Bedavaya"	Gökhan Tepe	Canözüm	Yıldız Tilbe	Nurhat Şensesli
2000	"Sevme Beni"	Bengü	Hoş Geldin	Yıldız Tilbe	Ufuk Yıldırım
2000	"Rüya"	Bengü	Hoş Geldin	Yıldız Tilbe	Tuğrul Odabaşı
2001	"Dağlar"	İbrahim Tatlıses	Yetmez mi?	Yıldız Tilbe	Yıldız Tilbe
2001	"Ayrılamam"	İbrahim Tatlıses	Yetmez mi?	Yıldız Tilbe	Yıldız Tilbe
2001	"Vazgeçmem"	Ebru Gündeş	Ahdım Olsun	Yıldız Tilbe	Yıldız Tilbe
2002	"Aşk Lazımdır Her Eve"	Şilan Suna	Aşk Lazımdır Her Eve	Yıldız Tilbe	Mehmet Suna
2003	"Seni Sana Bırakmam"	İbrahim Tatlıses	Tek Tek	Yıldız Tilbe	Yıldız Tilbe
2003	"Al Al Al"	İbrahim Tatlıses	Tek Tek	Yıldız Tilbe	Yıldız Tilbe
2003	"Kara Gözlüm"	Toprak	Bu Delikanlıyı Unutamazsın	Yıldız Tilbe	Yıldız Tilbe
2003	"Aşksız Prens"	Rober Hatemo	Aşksız Prens	Yıldız Tilbe	Yıldız Tilbe
2004	"Kandıramazsın Beni"	Gülben Ergen	Uçacaksın	Yıldız Tilbe	Yıldız Tilbe
2004	"Öyle Büyü ki Kalbimde"	Gökhan Özen	Aslında	Yıldız Tilbe	Yıldız Tilbe
2004	"Ayrılığın Yükünü Kaldıramayız"	Abidin	Aşktan Yana	Yıldız Tilbe	Yıldız Tilbe
2004	"Bende İnsanım"	İbrahim Tatlıses	Aramam	Yıldız Tilbe	Yıldız Tilbe
2004	"Seninle Çok İşim Var"	Ebru Gündeş	Bize de Bu Yakışır	Yıldız Tilbe	Yıldız Tilbe
2004	"Adam Olsaydın"	Ebru Gündeş	Bize de Bu Yakışır	Yıldız Tilbe	Yıldız Tilbe
2004	"Nereden Bulacağım"	Eser Bayar	Aşkımı İtiraf Ediyorum	Yıldız Tilbe	Yıldız Tilbe
2004	"Senden Baska Bir Şey Bulamam"	Eser Bayar	Aşkımı İtiraf Ediyorum	Yıldız Tilbe	Yıldız Tilbe
2004	"Ayrılamam Ölmeyince"	Eser Bayar	Aşkımı İtiraf Ediyorum	Yıldız Tilbe	Yıldız Tilbe
2004	"Kara Güneş"	Levent Yüksel	Uslanmadım	Yıldız Tilbe	Yıldız Tilbe
2004	"Bana Döneceksin"	Demet Akalın	Banane	Yıldız Tilbe	Yıldız Tilbe
2004	"Vuracak"	Demet Akalın	Banane	Yıldız Tilbe	Yıldız Tilbe
2005	"Ben Çağırmam Geleceksin"	Ferman Toprak	Hayatı Tespih Yapmışım	Yıldız Tilbe	Yıldız Tilbe
2005	"Severim Ama Güvenemem Ki"	Firdevs	Firdevs	Yıldız Tilbe	Yıldız Tilbe
2006	"Lay La Lay Lalay"	Gülben Ergen	Gülben Ergen	Yıldız Tilbe	Yıldız Tilbe
2006	"Senden Çok Var"	Rober Hatemo	Sihirli Değnek	Yıldız Tilbe	Phoebus
2006	"Sana Değer"	Demet Akalın	Kusursuz 19	Yıldız Tilbe	Bülent Özdemir
2007	"Bizim Oralar"	Cem Yıldız	Aşk İmkansız	Yıldız Tilbe	Yıldız Tilbe
2008	"Kop Gel Günahlarından"	İbrahim Tatlıses	Neden	Yıldız Tilbe	Yıldız Tilbe
2008	"Ben Bir Şarkıyım Söz Müzik Sensin"	Petek Dinçöz	Frekans	Yıldız Tilbe	Yıldız Tilbe
2009	"Eline Düştüm"	Emir	Ben Sen Olamam	Yıldız Tilbe	Phoebus
2010	"İşim Olmaz"	Tarkan	Adımı Kalbine Yaz	Yıldız Tilbe	Tarkan
2010	"Dayan Yüreğim"	Demet Akalın	Zirve	Yıldız Tilbe	Yıldız Tilbe
2010	"Bozuyorum Yeminimi"	Demet Akalın	Zirve	Yıldız Tilbe	Bülent Özdemir
2011	"Gözlerimde Gece Oldu"	Ebru Yaşar	Delidir	Yıldız Tilbe	Yıldız Tilbe
2011	"Bilmece"	Deniz Açılmış	Bilmece	Yıldız Tilbe	Yıldız Tilbe
2011	"Sen De Sevme"	Deniz Açılmış	Bilmece	Yıldız Tilbe	Yıldız Tilbe
2011	"Bana Döneceksin"	Deniz Açılmış	Bilmece	Yıldız Tilbe	Yıldız Tilbe
2012	"Sessiz Sinema"	Funda Arar	Sessiz Sinema	Yıldız Tilbe	Febyo Taşel
2012	"Sudan Sebep"	Emir	Ateşten Bir Rüzgâr	Yıldız Tilbe	Gülşen
2012	"Veda Gecesi"	Emir	Ateşten Bir Rüzgâr	Yıldız Tilbe	Harry K
2012	"Favori Aşkım"	Ziynet Sali	Sonsuz Ol	Türkçe: Yıldız Tilbe; Alex Papaconstantinou, Marcus Englöf, Samuel Waerno	Alex Papaconstantinou, Marcus Englöf, Samuel Waerno
2012	"Leyla"	Onur Kırış	Leyla	Yıldız Tilbe	Temel Zümrüt
2013	"Yalancı Yarim"	Lerzan Mutlu	Oyuncu	Yıldız Tilbe	Yıldız Tilbe
2013	"Aşk Dolusun"	Kandemir Kaytaz	Aşk Dolusun	Yıldız Tilbe	Yıldız Tilbe
2013	"Aşk Yok Olmaktır"	Mabel Matiz	Yaşım Çocuk	Yıldız Tilbe	Yıldız Tilbe
2014	"En Kolay Beni"	Pınar Soykan	Buğulu Gözler	Yıldız Tilbe	Yıldız Tilbe
2014	"Mutlu Gibi Yaşasam da"	Pınar Soykan	Buğulu Gözler	Yıldız Tilbe	Yıldız Tilbe
2014	"Pabucumun Dünyası"	Rober Hatemo	Pabucumun Dünyası	Yıldız Tilbe	Yıldız Tilbe
2014	"El Adamı"	Ceylan Ertem	Amansız Gücenik	Yıldız Tilbe	Yıldız Tilbe, Suat Suna
2014	"Kahroloji"	Ceylan Ertem	Amansız Gücenik	Yıldız Tilbe	Yıldız Tilbe
2015	"Seveceksen Sev	Onur Görgün	Belki de Sevemedin	Yıldız Tilbe	Yıldız Tilbe
2015	''Taraf''	Funda Arar	Hoşgeldin	Yıldız Tilbe	Febyo Taşel
2016	"Aşk Beni"	Sertab Erener	Kırık Kalpler Albümü	Yıldız Tilbe	Yıldız Tilbe
2017	"Havalı Yarim"	Serdar Ortaç, Yıldız Tilbe	Cımbız	Yıldız Tilbe	Serdar Ortaç
2017	"İsmin Silinir"	Serdar Ortaç	Cımbız	Yıldız Tilbe	Serdar Ortaç, Tarık İster
2018	"Yar Yanına Geleceğim"	Güçlü Soydemir	İstanbul	Yıldız Tilbe	Yıldız Tilbe
2018	"Beni Benden Alırsan"	Gülçin Ergül	Arabesk	Yıldız Tilbe	Yıldız Tilbe
2018	"Kim Bu Gözlerindeki Yabancı"	Gülçin Ergül	Arabesk	Yıldız Tilbe	Yıldız Tilbe
2018	"Beni Sev"	Hande Yener	Beni Sev	Yıldız Tilbe	Devrim Karaoğlu
2018	"Beni Benden Alırsan"	Lerzan Mutlu	Aşk Acısı	Yıldız Tilbe	Yıldız Tilbe
2018	"Bir Alo De"	Lerzan Mutlu	Aşk Acısı	Yıldız Tilbe	Yıldız Tilbe
2019	"Penaltı ve Gol"	Fatih Ürek	Penaltı ve Gol	Yıldız Tilbe	Yıldız Tilbe
2020	"Yine Sevenler Sevsin"	Öykü Gürman	Yine Sevenler Sevsin	Yıldız Tilbe	Yıldız Tilbe
2020	"Sana Aşığım"	Gülçin Ergül	Davet	Yıldız Tilbe	Yıldız Tilbe
2020	"Kış Gülleri"	Gülben Ergen	Seni Kırmışlar	Yıldız Tilbe	Yıldız Tilbe
2021	"Olsun"	Hadise	Aşka Kapandım	Yıldız Tilbe, Devrim Karaoğlu	Devrim Karaoğlu
2021	"Sevgilim"	Murat Boz	Sevgilim	Yıldız Tilbe	Devrim Karaoğlu
2021	"Şivesi Sensin Aşkın"	Güliz Ayla	Şivesi Sensin Aşkın	Yıldız Tilbe	Yıldız Tilbe
2022	"Bir Kereden Hiçbir Şey Olmaz"	Gülşen	Bir Kereden Hiçbir Şey Olmaz	Yıldız Tilbe, Kenan Doğulu	Ozan Doğulu

* The list above includes songs given to other artists whose lyrics or music belong to Yıldız Tilbe. She has songs in her own albums that are written and composed by herself but are not mentioned in this list.

== Filmography ==
Film
Year	Title	Role	Notes
2018	Benim Adım Osssman	Herself	

Television
Year	Title	Role	Notes
2017–18	O Ses Türkiye	Herself	Season 7
2018	Jet Sosyete	Herself	Episode 17
