= Mabel Matiz =

Turkish singer-songwriter (born 1985)

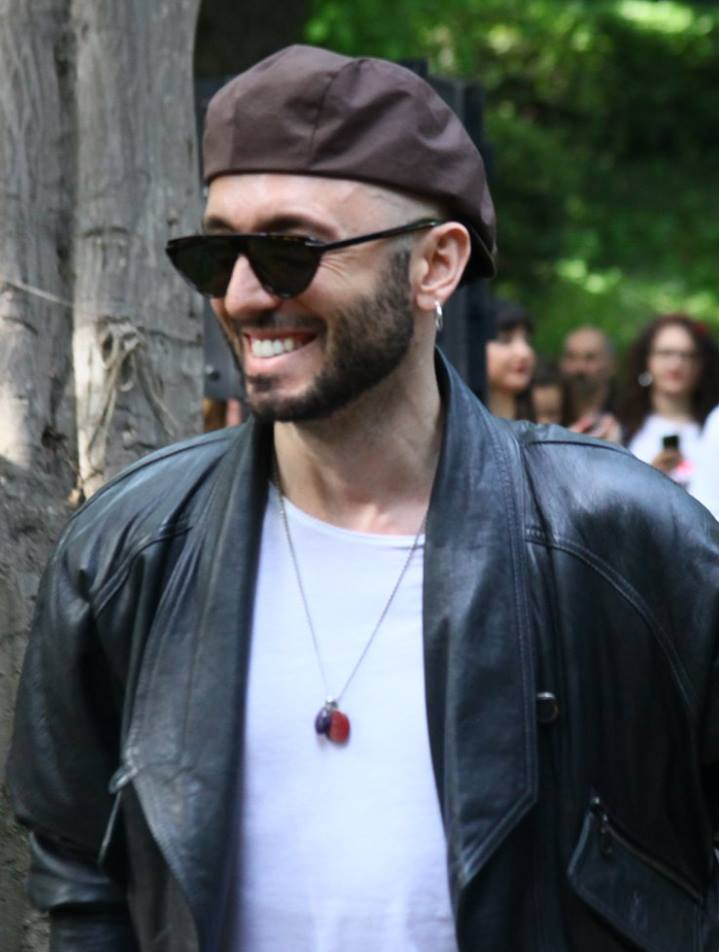
- Mabel Matiz in 2018
- Born: Fatih Karaca; 31 August 1985 (age 41); Tömük, Turkey
- Education: Istanbul University; Istanbul Bilgi University (left)
- Occupations: Singer-songwriter; dentist (formerly)
- Musical career
- Genres: Pop; rock
- Instruments: Guitar
- Years active: 2011–present
- Labels: Esen; DMC; Zoom; Pose
- Website: mabelmatiz.com

Fatih Karaca (Turkish pronunciation: [faːˈtih kaɾaˈdʒa]; born 31 August 1985), better known by his stage name Mabel Matiz (pronounced [maˈbæl maˈtiz]), is a Turkish pop music singer-songwriter.

He chose his stage name from two different words that he was inspired by. "Mabel" is from the Turkish novel Kumral Ada Mavi Tuna by Buket Uzuner. It is the nickname of Tuna, who is one of the main characters. "Matiz" is a slang word in the old Greek language meaning "drunk". "Mabel Matiz" reflects his point of view about the world and life.

He has released six studio albums.

== Musical career ==
He began releasing his own songs via Myspace in 2008. Turkish music producer Engin Akıncı noticed his songs and offered him an album. He released his first studio album, Mabel Matiz, in 2011 with Esen Müzik label. Except two songs, which were written by Birhan Keskin and Yalçın Tosun, all of the other pieces were written and composed by Mabel Matiz himself.

He released his second studio album, Yaşım Çocuk, in 2013 with DMC label. He covered popular Yıldız Tilbe song "Aşk Yok Olmaktır" in this album. Various songs from the album, including "Zor Değil", "Aşk Yok Olmaktır", "Yaşım Çocuk" and "Alaimisema" became popular hits and Milliyet Sanat awarded it as the "Album of the Year". He contributed in Aysel Gürel tribute album, Aysel'in, in June 2013 by performing Sezen Aksu cover "Sultan Süleyman".

In 2025, the Interior Ministry filed an obscenity complaint against Matiz for his song "Perperişan" (Devastated) and imposed a travel ban on him according to his lawyers. According to Bienet, this is the first case of an individual song being targeted through the courts in Turkey.

== Personal life ==
He grew up a son of a truck driver and Cyprus veteran father Ali, and housewife mother Maya. As a child, he suffered from a severe stutter that made it hard for him to express himself. However, he managed to overcome that by boosting his self-esteem through writing and music. By high school, he was even playing in a theater company. After completing his compulsory education in Mersin, he moved to Istanbul for university education and graduated from Istanbul University, Dentistry Faculty in 2008. He briefly worked in a healthcare clinic until advancing into music career. He is an LGBTI+ rights activist.

In memory of his parents, Mabel gave his mother's name to his 4th studio album Maya, while the song "Babamı Beklerken" ([while] waiting for my father) on the album is written for his father, who later died on 23 February 2019 at age 66.

In the Turkish literature section of the Higher Education Institutions Exam held on 27 June 2020, a total of 2 questions containing lyrics from Mabel Matiz's album Maya and the song "Fırtınadayım" were asked, which later caused a stir on social media.

== Discography ==
=== Studio albums ===
Year	Album	Record company
2011	Mabel Matiz: Format: MC, LP, CD, digital download	Esen Müzik
2013	Yaşım Çocuk: Format: MC, LP, CD, digital download	Doğan Music Company
2015	Gök Nerede: Format: CD, digital download	Doğan Music Company
2018	Maya: Format: CD, digital download	Doğan Music Company
2023	Fatih: Format: Digital download	Pose Records
2025	Aklıselim: Format: Digital download	Pose Records

=== Compilation albums ===
Album	Album info
Mabel Matiz & Yaşım Çocuk	Released: January 2016; Label: DMC; Format: CD, digital download

=== Live albums ===
Album	Album info
Dudaklarımdan Yıllarca Düşmeyecek	Released: November 2024; Label: DMC; Format: Digital download

=== Singles ===
Year	Album	Record label	Chart positions
Year	Album	Record label	WW
2014	Kör Heves (with Ceylan Ertem): Date: 2014; Format: digital download	Ada Müzik	—
2014	Alaimisema (2014 Radio Edit): Date: 2014; Format: digital download		—
2016	Mavi (with Ah! Kosmos): Date: 2016; Format: MC, LP, CD		—
2016	Fena Halde (Reworks): Date: 2016; Format: MC, LP, CD	DMC	—
2016	Geçti Dost Kervanı: Date: 2016; Format: Digital download	Mabel Matiz	—
2017	Ya Bu İşler Ne: Date: 2017; Format: MC, LP, CD	DMC	—
2018	Öyle Kolaysa: Date: 2018; Format: MC, LP, CD	DMC	—
2019	Gözlerine: Date: 2019; Format: Digital download	Pose Records	—
2020	Toy: Date: 2020; Format: Digital download	Pose Records	—
2021	Kahrettim: Date: 2021; Format: Digital download	Pose Records	—
2022	Hanfendi: Date: 2022; Format: Digital download	Pose Records	—
2022	Kavşaklar: Date: 2022; Format: Digital download	Pose Records	—
2022	Karakol: Date: 2022; Format: Digital download	Pose Records	—
2022	Fan: Date: 2022; Format: Digital download	Pose Records	—
2022	Antidepresan (with Mert Demir): Date: 4 November 2022; Format: Digital download	Pose Records	97
2023	Aferin: Date: 21 April 2023; Format: Digital download	Pose Records	—
2023	Uçkun (with Hello Psychaleppo): Date: 5 May 2023; Format: digital download	Pose Records	—
2024	Kömür: Date: 2024; Format: Digital download	Pose Records	—
2024	Sen Benim Şarkılarımsın: Date: 2024; Format: Digital download	UBR Company	—
2025	Gök Mavi: Date: 2025; Format: Digital download	Pose Records	—
2025	Kayboldum Masalında (with Aleyna Tilki): Date: 2025; Format: Digital download	DMC	—
2026	Dağılıyorum Olaysız: Date: 2026; Format: Digital download	Pose Records	—
2026	Umrumdışı: Date: 2026; Format: Digital download	Pose Records	—

== Other contributions ==
Year	Album	Song
2013	Aysel'in: Date: 2013; Format: MC, LP, CD	Sultan Süleyman
2017	Mirkelam Şarkıları: Date: 2017; Format: MC, LP, CD	Laubali
2017	Mahzuni'ye Saygı: Date: 2018; Format: MC, LP, CD	Yuh Yuh (with Selda Bağcan)
2018	Yıldız Tilbe'nin Yıldızlı Şarkıları: Date: 2018; Format: MC, LP, CD	Değilsin
2020	Hikayesi Var: Date: 2020; Format: Digital	Nerde (with Nükhet Duru)
2022	Yeni Türkü Zamansız: Date: 2022; Format: Digital	Nerelere Gideyim
2024	Gündoğarken Patika Vol 1 pt. 1: Date: 2024; Format: Digital	Sen Benim Şarkılarımsın
2025	Selami Şahin Şarkıları 3: Date: 2025; Format: Digital	Ben Sevdalı Sen Belalı
