= Rober Hatemo =

Turkish pop singer of Armenian descent (born 1974)

- Born: December 25, 1974 (age 51); Çanakkale, Turkey
- Genres: Pop, fantezi
- Occupation: Singer
- Years active: 1997–present
- Labels: BMG (1997–2001); Erol Köse Production (2003, 2010–2014); Avrupa Müzik (2006); Sony Music (2014–present)

Rober Hatemo (Armenian: Րոբեր Հաթեմո, born December 25, 1974) is a Turkish pop singer of Armenian descent.

== Life ==
He is of Armenian descent and was born in Çanakkale.

== Discography ==
=== Albums ===
- Esmer – 1997
- Sen Farklısın – 1998
- Azılı Bela – 2001
- Aşksız Prens – 2003
- Sihirli Değnek – 2006
- Pabucumun Dünyası – 2014

=== EPs ===
- Mahrum – 2010

=== Singles ===
- Dikkat – 2015
- Giden Candan Gidiyor – 2017
- Canına Okuyacağım – 2018
- İnsan Sevince – 2022
- Nasıl Bir Yılansın – 2023
- Bu Delikanlıyı Unutamazsın (feat. Yıldız Tilbe) – 2024

=== Charts ===
| Album | Single | Peak position |
| Album | Single | Turkey |
|---|---|---|
| Sihirli Değnek | "Senden Çok Var" | 4 |
