= Mabel Matiz (album) =

Studio album by Mabel Matiz
- Released: 11 May 2011 (Turkey)
- Genre: Pop, rock
- Length: 46:46
- Producer: Esen Müzik

Mabel Matiz chronology
Mabel Matiz (2011)	Yaşım Çocuk (2013)

Singles from Mabel Matiz
- 1. "Arafta" Released: 9 May 2011; 2. "Söylese O Ben Söyleyemem" Released: 24 September 2011; 3. "Kül Hece" Released: 16 December 2011; 4. "Filler ve Çimen" Released: 20 March 2012; 5. "Barışırsa Ruhum" Released: 27 August 2012

Mabel Matiz is Turkish pop and rock singer Mabel Matiz's first studio album, which was released on 11 May 2011 in Turkey. Album was published in Turkey.

== Track listing ==
No.	Title	Writer(s)	Composer (s)	Length
1.	"Arafta"	Mabel Matiz	Mabel Matiz
2.	"Filler ve Çimen"	Mabel Matiz	Mabel Matiz
3.	"Kül Hece"	Mabel Matiz	Mabel Matiz
4.	"Söylese O Ben Söyleyemem"	Mabel Matiz	Mabel Matiz
5.	"Mori'nin Meyhanesi"	Mabel Matiz	Mabel Matiz
6.	"Öteki"	Mabel Matiz	Mabel Matiz
7.	"Barışırsa Ruhum"	Mabel Matiz	Mabel Matiz
8.	"Peruk Gibi Hüzünlü"	Mabel Matiz	Mabel Matiz
9.	"Matizin Şarkısı"	Mabel Matiz	Mabel Matiz
10.	"Hercai Menekşe"	Mabel Matiz	Mabel Matiz
11.	"Zaman"	Mabel Matiz	Mabel Matiz
12.	"Şüpheli Şarkının Şairi"	Mabel Matiz	Mabel Matiz
Total length:				46:46
