= Maya (Mabel Matiz album) =

Studio album by Mabel Matiz
- Released: 20 June 2018
- Studio: Gevrec Music Production; (Kadıköy, Istanbul)
- Genre: Synth-pop
- Length: 1:39:34
- Label: DMC; Zoom
- Producer: Mabel Matiz; Sabi Saltiel

Mabel Matiz chronology
| Gök Nerede (2015) | Maya (2018) | Fatih (2023) |

Singles from Maya
- 1. "Ya Bu İşler Ne" Released: 11 August 2017; 2. "Öyle Kolaysa" Released: 2 February 2018

Maya is the fourth studio album by Turkish singer Mabel Matiz. It was released on 20 June 2018 by Doğan Music Company and Zoom Music. The album's preparation lasted two years, while studio recordings spanned over a year and a half. One year before the publication date, Matiz announced during the production that he would give his mother's name, "Maya", to the album.

Seven music videos were released for the songs "Ya Bu İşler Ne", "Öyle Kolaysa", "Sarmaşık", "A Canım", "Mendilimde Kırmızı Var", "Çukur", "Boyalı Da Saçların", and "Comme un animal" respectively. The first two were released as promotional singles months before the album's actual release.

== Background and release ==
In May 2017, Mabel Matiz shared an old photo of himself with his mother, announcing that he would name his fourth studio album after her. Taken in Sultanahmet in 2007, the photo shows him with long hair while his mother is talking to him.

Maya was released on 20 June 2018 by Zoom Music on digital platforms. The album was sold in physical form the following day in Turkey, and Doğan Music Company distributed the CDs.

== Music and lyrics ==
Except "Sarmaşık", all of the songs in Maya were written by Mabel Matiz himself. "Sarmaşık" was the only song for which Mabel Matiz worked with Sıla. The album is an eclectic pop work in general, but it also includes synth-pop, trap, disco and folk songs.

== Cover ==
Maya's album cover and booklet were designed by Selçuk Denyıldız. Mabel himself worked as a creative designer on the album, while Anıl Can took the role of art management and fashion consultancy.

== Critical reception ==
Maya received generally positive reviews from music critics. Hürriyet's Hikmet Demirkol liked the album and found it special, describing it as "A real musical awakening. A very special album that unlocks the inner closed doors as one listens to it repeatedly." Tolga Akyıldız from the same newspaper highlighted the innovation in the album and said "The album tells new things through both its sounds and lyrics with the specific style of Turkish pop and through Mabel Matiz's own musical journey. Mabel has broken the mold with his own style." Writing for NTV.com.tr, Suat Kavukluoğlu also emphasized on the album's innovation and said "Maya will change our music today and shed light on our future as well. ... It's like the most crowded family photo taken from past to present on this land. It has become in leaf on this land, and all sorts of feelings are present in these songs."

== Promotion ==
Before Maya's eventual release, two songs were published as promotional singles with separate music videos: "Ya Bu İşler Ne" and "Öyle Kolaysa". Other songs from the album that were turned into music videos are "Sarmaşık", "A Canım", "Mendilimde Kırmızı Var", "Çukur", "Boyalı Da Saçların", and "Comme un animal".

The album's launching ceremony was held one day before its release at Cezayir in Beyoğlu, Istanbul.

== Track listing ==
All of the songs were written and composed by Mabel Matiz, expect "Sarmaşık" which he wrote together with Sıla.

Disc1
| No. | Title | Length |
|---|---|---|
| 1. | "Intro" | 1:36 |
| 2. | "Fırtınadayım" | 4:22 |
| 3. | "A Canım" | 4:23 |
| 4. | "Mendilimde Kırmızım Var" (feat. Sibel Gürsoy) | 6:02 |
| 5. | "Öyle Kolaysa" | 4:40 |
| 6. | "Babamı Beklerken" | 4:37 |
| 7. | "Sarmaşık" | 4:38 |
| 8. | "Çukur" | 5:31 |
| 9. | "Ya Bu İşler Ne" | 3:56 |
| 10. | "Ayrılık Buna Denir" | 5:09 |
| 11. | "Dualar Değişir" (feat. Ah! Kosmos) | 3:25 |
| Total length: | | 48:19 |

Disc 2
| No. | Title | Length |
|---|---|---|
| 1. | "Kalbime Azap" (feat. Gülden Karaböcek) | 4:06 |
| 2. | "Boyalı Da Saçların" | 5:32 |
| 3. | "Yaban" | 4:39 |
| 4. | "Pembe" | 4:43 |
| 5. | "Sarışın Değil" | 5:16 |
| 6. | "Mükemmeli" | 3:30 |
| 7. | "Yıldızların Peşinde" | 4:28 |
| 8. | "Dualar Değişir" (Alternative Version) | 2:28 |
| 9. | "Kara Beyaz Kedi" | 3:44 |
| 10. | "Pembe" (Taner Yücel Version) | 4:36 |
| 11. | "Canki" | 3:47 |
| 12. | "Comme un animal" | 4:26 |
| Total length: | | 51:15 |

== Release history ==
| Country | Date | Format | Label | Ref. |
|---|---|---|---|---|
| Turkey | 20 June 2018 | Digital download | Doğan Music Company; Zoom Music | |
| Worldwide | 20 June 2018 | Digital download | Doğan Music Company; Zoom Music | |
| Turkey | 21 June 2018 | CD | Doğan Music Company; Zoom Music | |

== Personnel ==
- Mabel Matiz – vocals, songwriter, composer, producer, creative designer
- Sabi Saltiel – producer
- Engin Akıncı – executive producer
- Sıla Gençoğlu – songwriter, composer
- Anıl Can – art director, styling

Credits adapted from Maya's album booklet.
