= Selahattin Taşdöğen =

Turkish actor (born 1951)

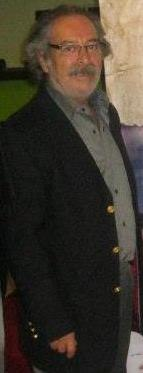
- Born: 19 July 1951 (age 74); Erzurum, Turkey
- Occupation: Actor
- Years active: 1969–present
- Spouse: Nevin Yılmaz (m. 2010)
- Children: 4
- Relatives: Naci Taşdöğen (brother)

Selahattin Taşdöğen (born 19 July 1951) is a Turkish actor.

In 1986, he graduated from Marmara University School of Fine Arts. Since the beginning of his career, he has appeared in various plays, movies and TV series. He began his career on stage in 1969 by joining Keloğlan Children's Theatre. He then worked for Türkbank Children's Theatre. In 1974, Taşdöğen started his career in cinema and television.

Selahattin Taşdöğen also works as a teacher. He has been teaching art, art history and tourism in various schools. Theatres where he has worked or contributed to include Bakırköy Comedy Theatre, Istanbul Theatre, Ercan Yazgan Theatre, Kenan Büke Theatre, Istanbul Municipality City Theatres, Levent Kırca-Oya Başar Theatre, and Yasemin Yalçın Theatre.

== Personal life ==
His brothers Erkan Taşdöğen and Naci Taşdöğen are also actors.

In 2010, he married actress Nevin Yılmaz in Üsküdar, Istanbul. Taşdöğen has been married three times, including twice with his second wife.

== Filmography ==
Year	Title	Role	Notes
1983	Kuruntu Ailesi		Television series
1984	Üç Karışlık Dünya		
1988	Kaynanalar		Television series
1990	Ah Şu Komşularımız		Television series
1992	Burnumu Keser misiniz?		Television series
1993	Kazı Kazan		Television film
1993	Hoş Memo	Hamdi	Television film
1993	Yanlış Adres	Tea house owner	Television film
1993	Şüpheci		
1994	Dam Üstünde Saksağan	Kemal	Television film
1994	Bozdur Bozdur Harca		Television film
1995	Çiçek Taksi	Restauranter Hıdır	Television series
1996	Tatlı Kaçıklar	Gambazoğlan	Television series
1996	Çılgın Bediş	Necmi Dede	Television series
1997	Çılgın Bediş	Necmi Dede	
1999	Uzaydan Adam Çıkmaz		Television series
1999	Bücür Cadı	Manager	Television series
1999–2003	Ayrılsak da Beraberiz	Mucittin	Television series
2000	Kahkaha Show		Television series
2000	Paşa Baba Konağı	Watchman	Television series
2000	Dikkat Bebek Var		Television series
2000	Ozanlar Yaylası		
2000	Mazlum		Television series
2000	Kızım ve Ben	Butcher	Television series
2000	Vizontele	Simo	
2001	Naylon Düşler		Short film
2001	Pembe Panjurlu Ev		Television series
2001	Kel Alaattin		Television film
2001	Çılgın Bediş	Necmi Dede	Television series
2002	Sırlar Dünyası	Taxi customer	Television series
2002	Şeytan Bunun Neresinde	Kürşat	
2002	Asayiş Berkemal		Television series
2002	Baldız Geliyorum Demez	Hüsrev	Television series
2003	Vizontele Tuuba	Muhtar Feso	Television film
2004	Hayatın İçinden	Hayri	Television series
2004	Bizim Karakol	Drunk Remzi	Television series
2004	Ah Be İstanbul	Hamza	Television series
2004	Büyük Buluşma	Kemal	Television series
2004–2007	En Son Babalar Duyar	Kudret	Television series
2005	Profesyonel Çaylaklar		Television film
2006	Kiralık Oda		
2006	Pardon Yani		Television film
2007	Hakkını Helal Et	Davut	Television series
2007	Demokrasi İçin		Television film
2007	Umutlar Tükenmeden		Television series
2008	Kurbanlık	Imam	
2008	Nekrüt	Hamza	
2008	Prenses Perfinya	Vektor	Television series
2008	Ateşle Barut		Television series
2008	Kötüler Konağı	Tahir Candan	Television film
2008	Sevgili Düşmanım	Hikmet	Television series
2009	Ramazan Güzeldir	Arif Hoca	Television series
2009	7 Kocalı Hürmüz	Coffee shop owner	
2009	Deli Dumrul Kurtlar Kuşlar Aleminde	Korucu	
2009	Kubilay	Laz İbrahim	
2009	Canını Sevdiğim İstanbul'u		Television series
2010	Çete Ayşe		
2010	Nene Hatun	Turan Dayı	
2010	Kardelen	Muhtar Ahmet	
2010–2011	Dürüye'nin Güğümleri	Halim Ağa	Television series
2011	Geniş Aile	Mithat Dayı	Television series
2011	Berlin Kaplanı		
2011	Komik Bir Aşk Hikayesi	Hamdi	
2012	Düşman Kardeşler	Rıza	Television series
2012	Oğlum Bak Git	Rüstem	
2012	Van Görü Canavarı		
2012	İkizler Firarda	Çiftçi Rıza Dayı	
2013	Qüfür	Dalli	
2013	Size Deniz Getireceğim		
2014	Eyyvah Eyvah 3		
2014	Mihrap Yerinde	Aydın	Television series
2014–2016	Kertenkele: Yeniden Doğuş	Azmi Bulut / Meczup Azmi	Television series
2016	Ateş		Film
2018	Kafalar Karışık	Muhtar Emmi	Film
2019	Bizim Hikaye	Zihni Elibol	Television series
2020	Nasipse Olur		Television film
2021	Aşka Dair		Film
2023	Başım Belada		Television series
