= Fosforlu Cevriyem =

Live album by İbrahim Tatlıses
- Released: 1988
- Label: Emre

İbrahim Tatlıses chronology
Kara Zindan (1988)	Fosforlu Cevriyem (1988)	İnsanlar (1989)

Fosforlu Cevriyem is a hit 1988 live album by İbrahim Tatlıses. The album includes some of the singer's best known arabesk songs such as "Beyaz Gül Kirmızı Gül", "Fosforlu Cevriyem", and "Yeşil Yeşil", with other uzun hava (long tune) tracks.

== Track listing ==
1. Gülnarlım (10:00)
2. Fosforlu Cevriyem (5:30)
3. Sizi Nasıl Özledim (2:57)
4. Aşıksın Sen Aşıksın (4:44)
5. Dergah Senden (U.H.)(Aslında bir Azerbaycan sarkisi) (1:37)
6. Sarhosum Oy (3:46)
7. Bende Bir İnsan Oğluyum (2:48)
8. Yeşil Yeşil (5:53)
9. Esmer'in Adı Oya (3:53)
10. Kadifeden Kesesi (4:14)
11. Canım Dediklerim (5:02)
12. Beyaz Gül Kirmızı Gül (4:27)
13. Ya Ley (4:58)
14. Aşkımsın Sevdalımsın & Allah Allah (5:06)
