= Çılgın Bediş =

- Genre: Sitcom, Teen drama, Comedy
- Created by: Zeki Keskin
- Directed by: Ozan Aydın; Turgut Yasalar
- Starring: Yonca Evcimik; Cenk Torun; Çiçek Dilligil; Selahattin Taşdöğen; Ayten Uncuoğlu; Ayten Erman; Sinan Bengier; Selma Sonat
- Theme music composer: Aykut Gürel
- Opening theme: "Çılgın Bediş" performed by Yonca Evcimik
- Country of origin: Turkey
- Original language: Turkish
- No. of seasons: 4
- No. of episodes: 70

Production
- Producer: Ayhan Aybek
- Running time: 45 minutes

Original release
- Network: Kanal D (1996-1999); SHOW (2000-2001)
- Release: July 8, 1996 – March 3, 2001

Çılgın Bediş (English, Crazy Bediş) is a Turkish youth television series that first displayed in TV in 1996. The first part was published on Monday, July 8. From 1996 until 1999, Kanal D aired the series. In 2000 it shifted to a different channel, passed to the Show TV. The series ended in 2001. Yonca Evcimik has the leading role.

== Cast ==
Main characters

- Yonca Evcimik as Çılgın Bediş
- Cenk Torun as Oktay
- Çiçek Dilligil as Mükü
- Selahattin Taşdöğen as Necmi Dede
- Sonay Aydın as Banu
- Sinan Bengier as Orhan (Bediş father)
- Selma Sonat as Canan (Bediş mother)
- Ayten Erman as Mefaret Hanım
- Gökhan Mete as Mustafa Koç
- Ayten Uncuoğlu as Müdire Nazime Hanım
- Zeynep Kaçar as Zeynep
- Gülçin Hatıhan as Başak
- Başak Sayan as Nesrin
- Dolunay Soysert as Mihrace
- Rıza Sönmez as Savaş
- Tuncer Sevi as Balıkçı Peyami
- Ahmet Özuğurlu as Durali
- Ercüment Balakoğlu as Bakkal Remzi

== Seasons ==
- Season 1: episodes 1-52 (08.07.1996 - 28.07.1997)
- Season 2: episodes 53–62.(23.09.1997 - 29.12.1997)
- Season 3: episodes 63–65.(04.09.1999 - 18.09.1999)
- Season 4: episodes 66–70. 31.12.2000 - 03.03.2001)
