= Güzel (album) =

Studio album by Yıldız Tilbe
- Released: 2008
- Genre: Pop
- Length: 68:26
- Label: Seyhan Müzik

Yıldız Tilbe chronology
Tanıdım Seni (2006)	Güzel (2008)	Aşk İnsanı Değiştirir (2009)

Güzel (English: Beautiful) is the eleventh studio album by Turkish pop music singer, Yıldız Tilbe. The album includes 16 songs. Lyrics and musics are by Yıldız Tilbe. The album was released in 2008.

== Track listing ==
1. Seni Hâlâ Bekliyorum – (I Still Have Been Waiting For You)
2. Git Gör Gününü – (Go See Your Day)
3. Ayıp Değil Mi Canım – (Is It Not Shame Sweethearth)
4. Dünden Bugüne – (From Yesterday To Today)
5. Ben Masumum – (I Am Innocent)
6. Güzel – (Beautiful)
7. Erkeğimsin (Kıskançlık Sendromu) – (You Are My Boy / Jealousy Syndrome)
8. Nazlı Yarim – (My Coy Beloved)
9. Aşk Bir Kahkaha – (Love Is A Laugh)
10. Ben Senin Var Ya – (I Have About You)
11. Aşk Bağlanmaz Ki – (Love Do Not Attach)
12. Çöpteyim – (I Am Garbage)
13. Seni Anlattım Aşka – (I Told You to the Love)
14. Kara Güneş – (Black Sun)
15. Şarkıların Şarkısı – (The Song of Songs)
16. Ben Olaydım – (If I Was to the Point)
