= Neden (İbrahim Tatlıses album) =

Studio album by İbrahim Tatlıses
- Released: 2008
- Label: İdobay Müzik

İbrahim Tatlıses chronology
Bulamadım (2007)	Neden (2008)	Yağmurla Gelen Kadın (2009)

Neden (Why?) is a 2008 Turkish-language pop album by Kurdish-Turkish singer İbrahim Tatlıses. The album was Tatlıses return to music after having stood as a candidate for Cem Uzan's populist and liberal Genç Parti (Young Party) in Istanbul in the July 2007 Turkish general election, where the Party failed to make the minimum national votes to have representation.

Tatlıses composed his own title track "Neden" ("why?) and released this as lead single, becoming one of his best known songs. The song starts with "Ben ağlarken gülüyorsun neden" ("Why do you laugh when I cry") and repeats the refrain "why" in almost every line of the song. The album's second track is a cover of "Kop Gel Günahlarından" by female pop singer Yıldız Tilbe, which marks the last time Tatlıses would work with Tilbe before a break of all connections in 2009. Among the other songs "Pusat" is a cover of the song by Cengiz Özkan and "Arguvanlım" a cover of the song by Mehmet Özcan.

The 2008 album, although including some Kurdish themes, did not include any song with lyrics in the Kurdish language; that barrier was broken the following year on the album Yağmurla Gelen Kadın (2009) with the inclusion of the Kurdish song "Şemmame". Tatlıses has continued to include and perform Kurdish songs since, despite a third assassination attempt in 2011.

== Track listing ==
1. "Neden" (İbrahim Tatlıses)
2. "Kop Gel Günahlarından" (Yıldız Tilbe)
3. "Sözüm Yok Artık" (Rıza Sarraf)
4. "Bir Yıldız Kaydı" (İbrahim Tatlıses)
5. "Gelmezsen Gelme" (İbrahim Tatlıses) Nakarat, Gelmezsen Gelme anonimdir
6. "Hadi Hadi" (lyrics anon, music Aslı Zen)
7. "Eşik Taşı" (Rıza Sarraf)
8. "Pusat" (Cengiz Özkan)
9. "Layık Değilsin" (lyrics Zeki Tutsak, music Bedirhan Kırmızızik: Zeki Tutsak, İbrahim Tatlıses )
10. "Tosuno" (lyrics Bedirhan Kırmızı, music Bedirhan Kırmızı,İbrahim Tatlıses)
11. "Senden İnsaf Diler Yarın" (lyrics Tunar Rahmanoğlu, music Vugar Ebdulov)
12. "Neler Gördüm" (İbrahim Dizlek)
13. "Arguvanlım" (Mehmet Özcan) Düet, Serpil Sarı ile birlikte
14. "Hadi Hadi (Remix)" (lyrics anon, music Aslı Zen)
