= İbrahim Tatlıses =

Turkish singer/actor (born 1952)

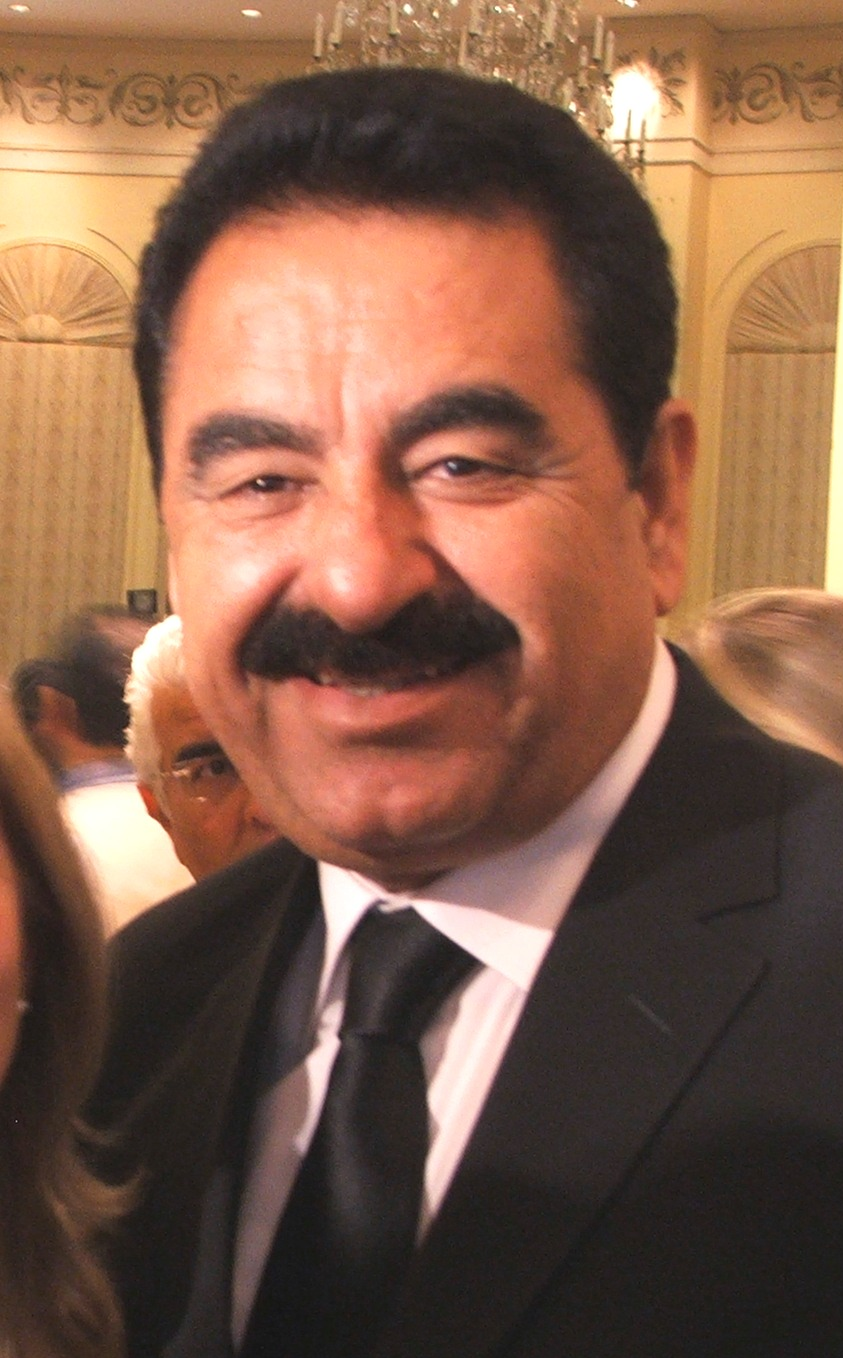
- Tatlıses in 2007

Background information
- Also known as: İbo, İmparator (transl. Emperor)
- Born: İbrahim Tatlı; 1952 (age 73–74); Urfa, Turkey
- Genres: Arabesque, pop-folk
- Occupations: Singer, actor, director, writer, producer, businessman
- Years active: 1970–present
- Labels: Palandoken Plak (1970–1974); Studyo Yalcin (1975–1977); Ömer Plak (1978); Türküola Plak (1979–1982); Star Plakcilik (1983–1984); Bayar Müzik (1985–1986); Emre Plak (1987–1989); Kaya Muzik (1990–1991); Raks Muzik (1992–1998); Universal Muzik (1999–2001); Erolkose Muzik (2003–2004); İdobay Muzik (2005–2010); Poll Production (2011–)
- Website: www.tatlises.com.tr (archived and inactive)

İbrahim Tatlıses (born İbrahim Tatlı in 1952) is a Turkish folk singer and former actor of Arab-Kurdish descent. Since the 1970s he has been one of the best-known and most successful singers of the pop Arabesk style. Tatlıses has recorded 42 albums, including notable albums such as Ayağında Kundura and Selam Olsun and was the host of the highly popular television programme İbo Show. He was also a leading actor that appeared in several dozen films, and also has had many business ventures.

== Life ==
=== Early years ===
İbrahim Tatlı was born in Urfa, Turkey to an Arab father and Kurdish mother inside a cave. His native language is Kurdish and Arabic. He lost his father during childhood and did not attend high school. He did not know how to read or write growing up.

=== Musical career ===
İbrahim Tatlıses is often regarded as one of the best-known singers of Turkey, being so famous that he has the nicknames "İbo" and "İmparator". He has had a critically acclaimed and illustrious music career in genres such as Turkish folk music and Arabesk, beginning in 1970 at the age of 18 with his first tape Kara Kız/Beni Yakma Gel Güzelim. He sold tapes and sang at weddings/restaurants until a producer discovered him in 1976. The following year his album Ayağında Kundura, featuring songs such as Ayağında Kundura, İndim Gülüm Bağına and Kırmızı Kurdele, was a smash hit and propelled him to fame. Some of his earlier songs have Kurdish origin and were translated into Turkish. From then on, the hit albums came one after another, such as the 1983 album Yalan, the 1985 album Mavi Mavi, and the 1987 album Allah Allah. He has recorded a total of 42 albums from 1970 to 2014.

=== Film and television ===
İbrahim Tatlıses has appeared in a total of 37 movies/TV shows, beginning in 1978 with Sabuha. In Turkey, well-known singers star in movies with the same name as the album they recently released, and thus the movies include songs from said albums. This is also seen in the 1975 Ayağında Kundura, its namesake being his smash-hit album. From there he appeared in numerous movies in the 1980s and 1990s, further cementing him as a famous singer and well-known actor in Turkey. Aside from the cinema industry, Tatlıses hosted the İbo Show, which aired from 1993 to 2011. He also founded a record and distribution company called Idobay Music in 2000, and in 2019 he transferred ownership of the company to another person who continues to work in the field of music.

=== Marriages ===
Tatlıses married his first wife, Adalet Sara, in Urfa. The couple had three children, a son named Ahmet Salim, and two daughters named Gülşen Sara and Gülden Ferrah. In 1979, he began a relationship with his Kara Yazma co-star Perihan Savaş. From his marriage to Savaş, he has a daughter named Melek Zübeyde. Savaş and Tatlıses later got divorced. In 1984, it was reported in the media that claims were made by Savaş that she was beaten for seven hours after being kidnapped by İbrahim Tatlıses, following which she applied to the prosecutor's office and asked for his arrest. Tatlıses said in his interrogation by the police, "Savaş is the mother of my child. To let her wander around would make it feel beneath me." From his relationship with his Günah co-star, Derya Tuna, he has a son, named İbrahim "İdo" Tatlıses.

After returning from Germany, Tatlıses married Ayşegül Yıldız on 27 September 2011 in the rehabilitation facility where he was receiving treatment. Mayor of Şişli Mustafa Sarıgül officiated the marriage service, while Fatih Terim was the witness. Together the couple had a daughter, named Elif Ada. They divorced in November 2013.

From his relationship with Işıl Çıtak, Tatlıses had a daughter named Dilan Çıtak, who was born in 1989. He acknowledged and accepted her as his child in 2013. In 2021, he announced his relationship with Gülçin Karakaya, who is 43 years his junior.

=== Assassination attempts ===
He was shot in the leg in 1990 and survived an assassination attempt in 1998.

On 14 March 2011, he was attacked and seriously wounded in the head. At 00:30 local time, he and his spokeswoman Buket Çakıcı were shot at by unknown assailants after leaving the offices of the private Turkish channel Beyaz TV following his weekly television show. As they entered their vehicle, Tatlises was hit with a bullet that entered the back of his skull and exited through the front. Çakıcı was also hit in the neck, but survived the attack. The perpetrators carried Kalashnikov rifles and escaped in a black car. He was taken to the Acıbadem Hospital in Istanbul for emergency treatment. He was operated on by İlhan Elmacı.He underwent a four-hour operation to have the bullet removed, after which he was in stable condition. He regained consciousness five days later. After a week, the doctors announced that he was recovering well. Turkey's Prime Minister Recep Tayyip Erdoğan visited him and also announced that he was recovering well. The police in Turkey arrested around 20 people involved in the attack. On April 7, Tatlıses left Acıbadem Hospital with a police escort and travelled to Atatürk International Airport, where he was boarded the Ministry of Health's Hawker 900XP air ambulance for Germany, to receive intensive rehabilitation at the Murnau Trauma Clinic.

=== Guardianship ===
In June 2022, Tatlıses's son Ahmet applied to the court to become his father's guardian as he thought his father was not mentally healthy.

=== Business ===
Tatlıses is involved in the restaurant and tourism businesses, as well as in construction projects with business partner Ali Sarıyıldız in Iraq.

=== Kurdish issue ===
In the 1980s the Turkish government had banned the use of Kurdish; at a concert in Sweden in December 1986, he had sung folk songs in Kurdish and was thus prosecuted for separatist propaganda, but found not guilty in 1987. The charge was dismissed after he showed regret. In 1988, he was asked by businessman Mehmet Yılmaz at a cultural festival in Uşak to sing a Kurdish folk song, but refused, saying "I am a Kurd, but the laws ban me from singing in Kurdish". For this, he was indicted on September 19, 1988.

In 1994 there was evidence that Turkish counter-guerrilla organizations targeted Kurdish businessmen, including Tatlıses, İdris Ozbir, Halis Toprak, and Necdet Ulucan. In 1998 it was reported that Tatlıses offered to be an intermediary between the government and the Kurdistan Workers' Party (PKK) during the armed conflict. He recorded a song with Iranian Kurdish musician Abdollah Alijani Ardeshir.

In 2018, he supported the Operation Olive Branch in Afrin laid out by the Turkish Armed Forces against the mainly-Kurdish militia YPG.

== Discography ==
- 1970: Kara Kız/Beni Yakma Gel Güzelim
- 1974: Sevdim de Sevilmedim
- 1976: Ashab Gecesi
- 1976: Urfa Emektaroğlu Bant Stüdyosu
- 1975: Ayağında Kundura
- 1977: Can Hatice
- 1977: Huzurum Kalmadı
- 1978: Doldur Kardeş İçelim
- 1979: Toprağın Oğlu Sabuha
- 1980: Bir Mumdur
- 1980: Ceylan
- 1981: Gelme İstemem
- 1981: Gülmemiz Gerek
- 1982: Yaşamak Bu Değil
- 1983: Yalan
- 1984: Benim Hayatım
- 1985: Mavi Mavi
- 1986: Gülüm Benim/Gülümse Biraz
- 1987: Allah Allah/Hülya
- 1988: Kara Zindan
- 1988: Fosforlu Cevriyem
- 1989: İnsanlar
- 1990: Söylim mi?
- 1991: Vur Gitsin Beni/Yemin Ettim
- 1992: Ah Keşkem
- 1993: Mega Aşk
- 1994: Haydi Söyle
- 1995: Klasikleri
- 1996: Bende İsterem
- 1996: Türkü Dinle,Söyle,Oyna
- 1998: At Gitsin
- 1999: Selam Olsun
- 2001: Yetmez Mi?
- 2003: Tek Tek
- 2004: Aramam
- 2005: Sizler İçin
- 2006: İmparator Siler de Geçer
- 2007: Bulamadım
- 2008: Neden?
- 2009: Yağmurla Gelen Kadın
- 2011: Hani Gelecektin
- 2014: Tatlıses Klasiği
- 2018: Yaylalar
- 2021: Gelmesin
- 2023: Medine'ye Varamadım
- 2023: Gözleri Bela Kız
- 2023: Kara Üzüm Habbesi
- 2024: Devamke
- 2025: Megri Megri

== Filmography ==
=== Actor ===
- 1978: Sabuha
- 1978: Ayağında Kundura
- 1978: Toprağın Oğlu
- 1979: Kara Yazma
- 1979: Kara Çadırın Kızı
- 1979: Fadile
- 1980: Çile
- 1980: Ayrılık Kolay Değil
- 1981: Seni Yakacaklar
- 1981: Yaşamak Bu Değil
- 1981: Tövbe
- 1982: Yalan
- 1982: Alişan
- 1982: Nasıl İsyan Etmem
- 1983: Yorgun
- 1983: Günah
- 1983: Futboliye
- 1984: Sevdalandım
- 1984: Ayşem
- 1985: Mavi Mavi
- 1985: Sevmek
- 1985: Yalnızım
- 1986: Gülümse Biraz
- 1986: Yıkılmışım Ben
- 1986: Sarhoş
- 1987: Gülüm Benim
- 1987: Allah Allah
- 1987: Dertli Dertli
- 1988: Hülya
- 1988: Aşıksın
- 1988: Bir Kulum İşte
- 1988: Kara Zindan
- 1988: Ben İnsan Değil Miyim
- 1989: Ceylan
- 1989: Fosforlu
- 1992: Aşık Oldum
- 1993: Tetikçi Kemal
- 1997: Fırat (mini) TV Series
- 2003: Hayat Bilgisi (Mini) TV Series
- 2009: Hicran Yarası

=== Director ===
- 1982: Yalan
- 1983: Yorgun
- 1983: Günah
- 1984: Ayşem
- 1986: Sarhoş
- 1986: Gülümse Biraz
- 1986: Gülüm Benim
- 1987: Dertli Dertli
- 1988: Hülya
- 1988: Aşıksın
- 1997: Fırat (mini) TV Series
- 2003: Hayat Bilgisi Konuk Oyuncu TV mini series
- 2009: Hicran Yarasi 5 Bolum Konuk Oyuncu

=== Writer ===
- 1983: Günah
- 1998: At Gitsin
- 1999: Selam Olsun
- 2001: Yetmez Mi?

=== Producer ===
- 1982: Yalan

== Sources ==
- Matthews, Owen (20 March 2011). "The Middle East's Sinatra". Newsweek. Archived from the original on 15 June 2013.
- Broughton, Simon; Ellingham, Mark; Trillo, Richard, eds. (1999). World music: the rough guide. Africa, Europe and the Middle East. Rough Guides music reference series. London: Rough Guides. p. 409. ISBN 9781858286358.
- Studia Musicologica Norvegica. Vol. 23. Universitetsforlaget. 1997. pp. 66–71.
- "İbrahim Tatlıses kimdir?". Kelebek. 6 December 2018.
