= Gök Nerede =

Studio album by Mabel Matiz
- Released: 13 February 2015 (Turkey)
- Genre: Rock, pop
- Length: 63:40
- Producer: Doğan Music Company

Mabel Matiz chronology
| Yaşım Çocuk (2013) | Gök Nerede (2015) | Maya (2018) |

Singles from Gök Nerede
- 1. "Gel" Released: 3 March 2015

Gök Nerede is Turkish pop and rock singer Mabel Matiz's third studio album, which was released on 13 February 2015 in Turkey.

== Track listing ==
| No. | Title | Writer(s) | Composer (s) | Length |
|---|---|---|---|---|
| 1. | "Tuzla Buz" | Mabel Matiz | Mabel Matiz | 4:07 |
| 2. | "Gel" | Mabel Matiz | Mabel Matiz | 4:47 |
| 3. | "Sarışın" | Mabel Matiz | Mabel Matiz | 5:01 |
| 4. | "Bir Hadise Var" | Nazan Öncel | Nazan Öncel | 4:40 |
| 5. | "Atlar Yoruldu" | Mabel Matiz | Mabel Matiz | 4:06 |
| 6. | "Fena Halde Bela" | Mabel Matiz | Mabel Matiz · Ezgi Altıner · Barış Manço | 3:45 |
| 7. | "Vals" | Mabel Matiz | Evgeny Grinko | 5:13 |
| 8. | "Dört Duvar" | Mabel Matiz | Mabel Matiz | 4:30 |
| 9. | "Adını Sen Koy" | Mabel Matiz | Mabel Matiz | 4:33 |
| 10. | "Ahu" | Mabel Matiz | Mabel Matiz | 3:34 |
| 11. | "Geziyorum Dünya İşte" | Mabel Matiz, Sinem Sal | Mabel Matiz · Cihan Mürtezaoğlu · Ali Kocatepe | 4:14 |
| 12. | "Kaba Kağıt" | Mabel Matiz | Mabel Matiz | 3:55 |
| 13. | "Gök Nerede" | Mabel Matiz | Mabel Matiz | 5:05 |
| 14. | "Pullarımı Gömdüğüm Deniz" | Mabel Matiz | Mabel Matiz | 5:37 |
| Total length: | | | | 63:40 |

== Sales ==
| Country | Sales |
|---|---|
| Turkey (MÜ-YAP) | 39,000 |
