= İlhan Elmacı =

Turkish neurosurgeon

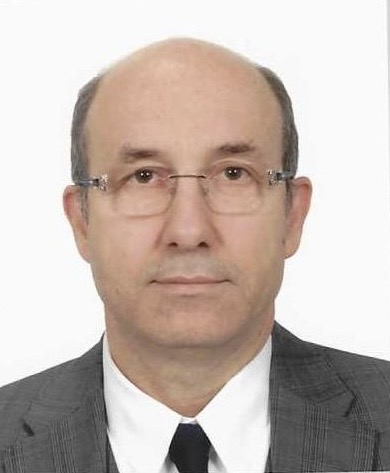
Ilhan Elmaci in 2024

İlhan Elmacı is a Turkish neurosurgeon specializing in brain and nerve surgery. He was born in Turkey in 1962. He has extensive experience in treating various neurological conditions and has contributed significantly to his field through both clinical practice and academic work.

== Education ==
Elmacı completed his medical education at Ankara University Medical School. He pursued further specialization in neurosurgery at Bakırköy Psychiatric Hospital in 1987. He completed his neurosurgery residency at Dr. Zeki Oral Clinic. In 1993 he received a training program in Microsurgery at Gazi Yaşargil Clinic at the University of Zurich. Between 1993 and 2003, he continued his work as a lecturer and assistant professor at the Prof. Necmettin Pamir clinic in Marmara University Faculty of Medicine. During the same period, he gained clinical and surgical achievements, especially in the fields of Neuro-oncology and Vascular Neurosurgery, at the clinic of Prof. Donlin Long and Daniele Rigamonti at Johns Hopkins University in America.

== Career ==
Elmacı began his career at Bakırköy Psychiatric Hospital, followed by a tenure at Marmara University School of Medicine. He has held prominent positions in various hospitals, including Acibadem University School of Medicine and Goztepe Training and Research Hospital.

İlhan Elmacı has played a key role in educating new surgeons in neurological microsurgery and promoting collaboration between ENT and neurosurgery in endoscopic skull base surgery. He enhanced the neuro-oncology council culture in Turkey and secured European Association of Neurosurgical Societies (EANS) accreditation for sustainable education at Göztepe Training and Research Hospital. He was the founding president of the Skull Base Society in Turkey and has contributed significantly to medical literature through international studies on the natural history of cavernous malformations.

Elmacı has published numerous research papers on topics such as the effects of esmolol infusion in craniotomy and the correlation of SPARC expression with meningioma outcomes. He is the author of the book "Dr. Hami Dilek, A Pioneer in Neurosurgery", which documents the establishment of neurosurgery in Turkey. He is also a member of several professional societies, including the European Society of Neuro-oncology and the Turkish Neurosurgical Society.

Throughout his career he worked in hospitals including Acibadem Healthcare Group Maslak Hospital between 2010-2012 and 2018-2021, Istanbul Medipol University between 2012-2014 where he established the Department of Neurosurgery, Memorial Health Group Hospitals between 2014-2018 as the Head of Neurosurgery Department and Liv Hospital Ulus between 2021-2023. As an affiliate hospital he is currently working at Istanbul Florance Nightingale Hospital.

In 2021 Elmaci founded the Elmaci Neurosurgery Clinic for the purpose of research, education and patient interviews.
