= Philipp Gropper =

German composer and saxophonist

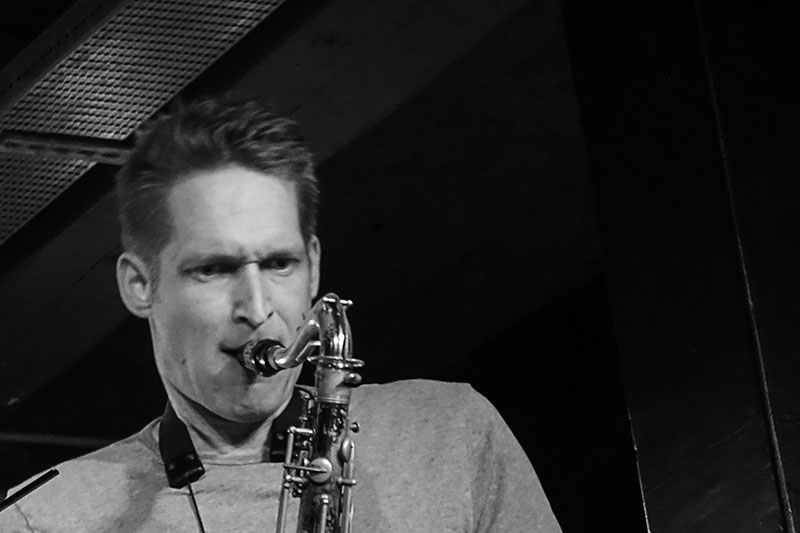
Philipp Gropper (Aarhus, Denmark, 2016)

Philipp Gropper (born 1978 in West-Berlin) is a German composer and saxophonist of jazz and of the modern creative style.

== Biography ==
From 1999 to 2006, Gropper studied jazz with Jerry Granelli, Peter Weniger and David Friedman at the Universität der Künste Berlin. From 2000 to 2002 he played in the Federal Jazz Orchestra under the direction of Peter Herbolzheimer, and was the first tenor saxophonist of the ensemble.

Gropper's own bands are Hyperactive Kid with Ronny Graupe and Christian Lillinger, Philipp Gropper's Philm (founded in 2011) with Elias Stemeseder, Andreas Lang and Oliver Steidle, and TAU (founded in 2013) with Philip Zoubek, Petter Eldh and Julian Sartorius. In addition, he is a member of the following bands European Movement Jazz Orchester, FUSK, Kathrin Pechlof Sextett, Uwe Steinmetz Stream Ensemble, Tobias Backhaus 6, Clave Azul, Chimaira and Pablo Held's Glow.

Since 2008 he was a member of the Jazzkollektiv Berlin. From August 2013 to March 2014 he was a scholarship holder of the Foundation Bartels Foundation in Basel.

== Discography ==
- 2005: Sonne (WhyPlayJazz), with Christian Lillinger, Johannes Fink, Carsten Daerr
- 2006: Hyperactive Kid (Shoebill Music), with Christian Lillinger, Ronny Graupe
- 2008: Hyperactive Kid: 3. (Jazzwerkstatt), with Christian Lillinger, Ronny Graupe
- 2008: Mads à la Cour (Stunt Records), with Mads La Cour (Håvard Wiik, Andreas Lang, Kresten Osgood)
- 2011: Fusk (WhyPlayJazz), with Rudi Mahall, Andreas Lang, Kasper Tom Christiansen
- 2011: EMJO live in Coimbra (Clean Feed), with Jure Pukl, Kaja Drachsler, Matthias Schriefl, Tobi Backhaus among others
- 2012: Licht (WhyPlayJazz), with Philipp Gropper's Philm (Håvard Wiik, Andreas Lang und Oliver Steidle)
- 2015: Hyperactive Kid: 10 Year Anniversary Live (WhyPlayJazz), with Christian Lillinger, Ronny Graupe
- 2015: The Mandman of Naranam (WhyPlayJazz), with Philipp Gropper's Philm (Elias Stemeseder, Andreas Lang, Oliver Steidle)
- 2017: Sun Ship (WhyPlayJazz), with Philipp Gropper's Philm
- 2019: Consequences (WhyPlayJazz), with Philipp Gropper's Philm
