= Delikanlım =

Studio album by Yıldız Tilbe
- Released: 15 June 1994
- Genre: Pop
- Length: 41:21
- Label: Tempa Foneks
- Producer: Aydın Oskay

Delikanlım (English: My Boy or My Lad) is the first album by Turkish singer Yıldız Tilbe. It was released on 15 June 1994 by publisher Tempa & Foneks. The album has ten songs. Tilbe wrote lyrics for all the songs, and four songs had both music and lyrics by Yıldız Tilbe. The folk song "Zülüf" was composed by Neşet Ertaş. Some of the other songs on the album are "Çal Oyna", "Sana Değer", "Sevemedim Ayrılığı", and "Sevdanın Tadı". Delikanlım was the biggest hit of 1994 in Turkey, and was played throughout the country that year. The album arrangements were done by Bülent Özdemir and Tarık Sezer. Featured vocalists on the album include Zeynep and Kenan Doğulu. The album sold 600,000 copies, becoming one of the best-selling albums in the 1990s in Turkey.

== Track listing ==
1. "Delikanlım" (My Boy or My Lad)
2. "Sevdanın Tadı" (The Taste of Love)
3. "Sana Değer" (It's Worth You)
4. "Çizilmemiş Resim" (Untraced Image)
5. "Çal Oyna" (Play and Dance)
6. "Hoşçakal" (Goodbye)
7. "Sevemedim Ayrılığı" (I couldn’t bear the Separation)
8. "Yalnız Çiçek" (Single Flower)
9. "Zülüf" (Zuluf)
10. "Selam" (Hello)
