= Ceylan Ertem =

Turkish singer-songwriter

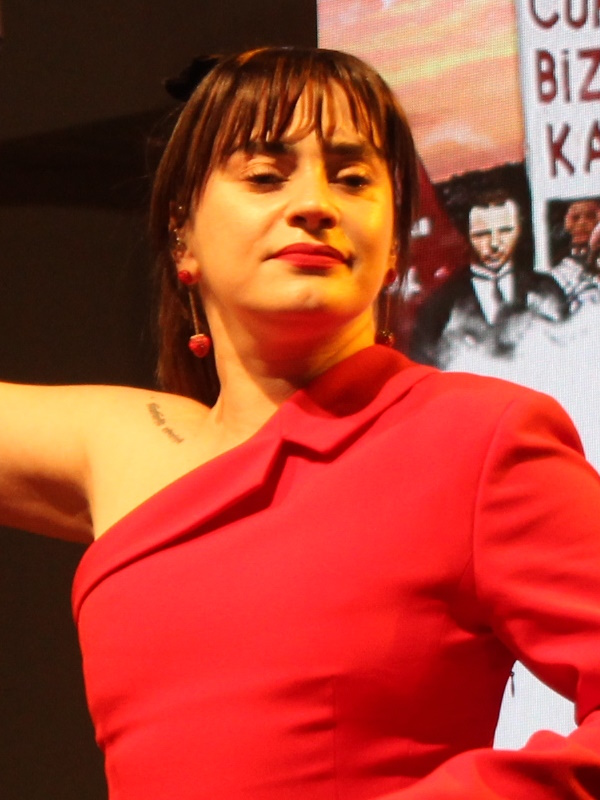
- Ertem in 2022

Background information
- Born: 26 December 1980 (age 45); Adapazarı, Sakarya, Turkey
- Years active: 2000–present
- Label: Sony BMG

Ceylan Ertem, sometimes stylized as Ceyl'an Ertem (born 26 December 1980) is a Turkish singer-songwriter.

== Early life and career ==
Ceylan Ertem started her musical career by joining the Adapazarı Municipality’s children choir. She started learning how to play piano in 1995 and moved to Istanbul in 1999 to continue her musical education. There she attended Müjdat Gezen's Art Academy and studied Western Music for 2 years. Then she enrolled in the Musicology department of Yıldız Technical University for her bachelor degree.

In 2000, she formed the band Anima with Tuncay Korkmaz. Anima, with its all members studying in the same faculty at the YTU, released their first and only album Animasal in 2006. In 2008, she started producing the radio show ŞubidaP on Açık Radyo, the show aired for 26 weeks.

== International work ==
In 2008, she recorded with Philipp Gropper and Wanja Slavin in Berlin for the project "Octophone". Later, she had many concerts in Berlin as well. She worked with other European bands such as "United Fools" of France and “Barana” of Netherlands.

== Albums ==
In 2010, she released her first solo album. The album was called Soluk. She recorded the whole album with 40 musicians. She continued with her solo career with Ütopyalar Güzeldir in 2012, Amansız Gücenik in 2014, and cover album YUH! in 2015. In 2016, she was invited to work on the project which was attributed to Zülfü Livaneli, on which she covered Kız Cocuğu. She released her 4th studio album Yine de Amin in February 2017.

== Discography ==
Solo albums

- Soluk (2010)
- Ütopyalar Güzeldir (2012)
- Amansız Gücenik (2014)
- Yine de Amin (2017)
- Seni Senin Gibiler Sevsin (2019)
- Sana Rağmen (2025)

Cover albums

- YUH! (2015)
- Cahille Sohbeti Kestim (2020)
- Duyuyor Musun? (2022)
- Babamın İstek Şarkıları (2026)

Split albums

- Animasal (with Anima) (2006)
- Xenopolis (with Barana) (2011)

Singles

- "Kör Heves" (duet with Mabel Matiz) (2014)
- "Hileli" (with Kolektif İstanbul) (2018)
- "Gel Sevelim" (2018)
- "Mavi Çocuklar" (2018)
- "Adem Olan Anlar" (2020)
- "Seyrüsefer" (feat. Melike Şahin) (2020)
- "Orman" (feat. Duygu Soylu) (2020)
- "Dünya Heveslisi" (2020)
- "Şeker Anne" (feat. Yunus Emre Ersoy) (2020)
- "Dardayım" (2021)
- "Çaresiz" (2021)
- "Gönül Çalamazsan Aşkın Sazını" (feat. Haluk Levent) (2021)
- "Sis" (2021)
- "O Son Kusura Bakacaktık" (2022)
- "Şah Mat" (2022)
- "Çarem Benim" (2022)
- "İki Yol" (with Coşkun Karademir) (2023)

As featured artist

- "Zalım" (from the album Mahzuni'ye Saygı) (2017)
- "Aşık Oluyorum Eyvah" (from the album İlhan Şeşen: Hediyem) (2018)
- "Çukur Benim" (with Ozan Doğulu & Kubilay Aka) (2019)
- "Sitem" (from the album Altın Düetler 2) (2019)
- "Destina" (from the album Hikayesi Var) (2020)
- "Benim İçin Üzülme" (from the album Saygı Albümü: Bergen) (2022)
- "Rüzgar" (from the album Yeni Türkü Zamansız) (2022)
- "Akşam Olmadan Gel" (from the album Selami Şahin Şarkıları 2) (2024)
