= Donlin Long =

American neurosurgeon (1934–2023)

Donlin Martin Long Jr. (April 14, 1934 – September 19, 2023) was an American neurosurgeon. He was the founding chair of the Department of Neurosurgery at Johns Hopkins.

== Early life and education ==
Long was born in Rolla, Missouri in 1934. His father, Donlin M. Long Sr., was a chemist for the state health department and his mother, Davine Elisabeth Johnson, was a schoolteacher.

Long received both his undergraduate and medical degrees at the University of Missouri. In 1964, he received a doctorate in neuroanatomy from the University of Minnesota. He researched the biological structure of the brain’s blood vessels.
