= Pınar Soykan =

Turkish singer (born 1980)

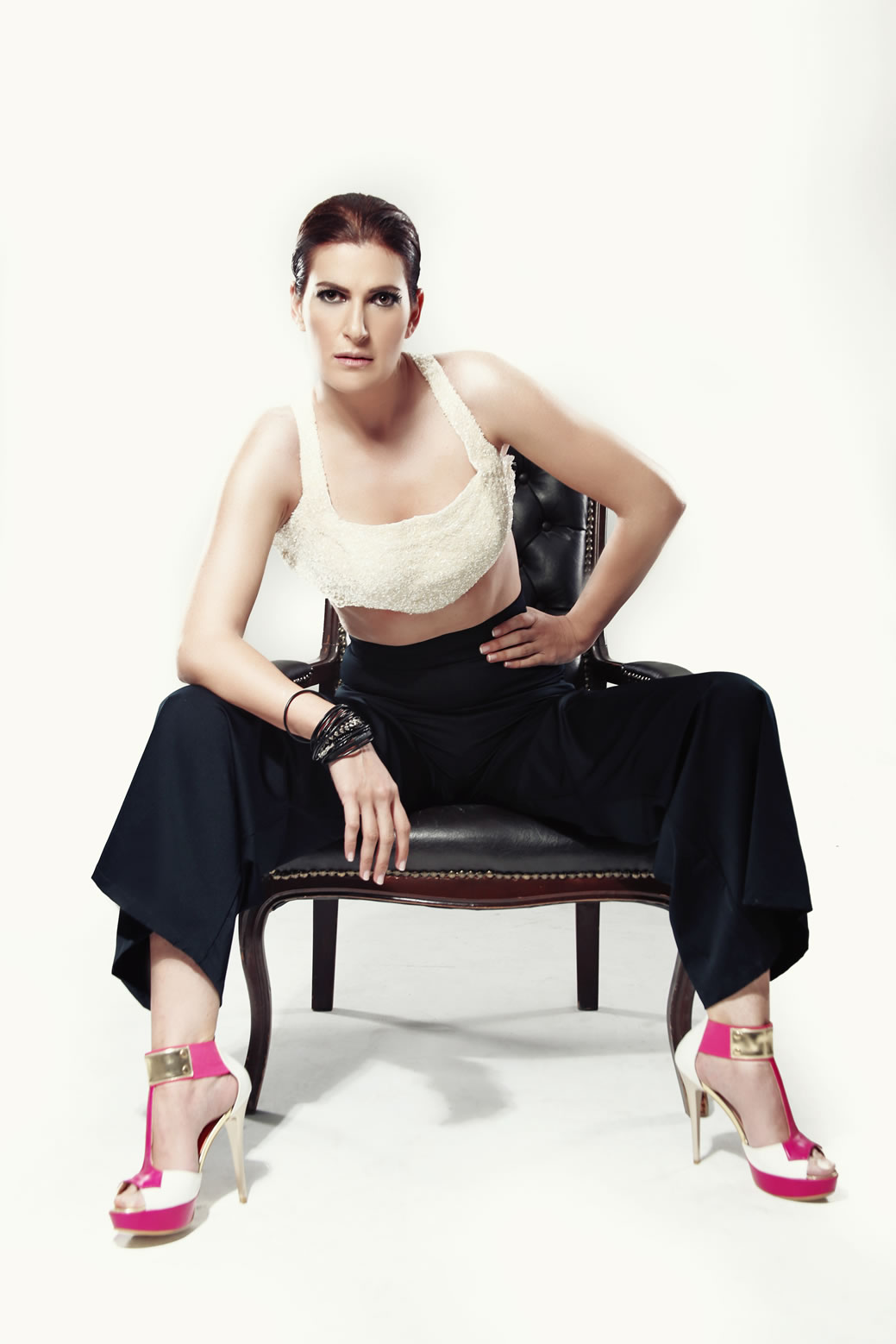
- Pınar Soykan in 2015

Background information
- Born: 24 April 1980 (age 45); Gölcük, Kocaeli, Turkey
- Genres: Pop, Fantezi
- Occupation: Singer
- Years active: 2004–present
- Labels: SOOLY MUSIC
- Website: www.pinarsoykan.com

Pınar Soykan (born 24 April 1980) is a Turkish singer.

She was educated in Kocaeli until 1999. Following the 1999 İzmit earthquake, she quit her first job as a teacher. In 2004, she moved to Istanbul and took part in the Best Model of Turkey beauty competition, where she ranked 16th. After receiving music lessons from Fatih Ertür, she released her first EP Kına.

In 2014, her first studio album, Buğulu Gözler, was released by Doğan Music Company.

As of 2020, Pınar Soykan is signed with SOOLY MUSIC.

Pınar Soykan is married to Orçun Soykan.

== Discography ==
Albums

- Buğulu Gözler (2014)

EPs

- Kına (2011)

Singles

- "Yokum Ben" (2017)
- "Mesela" (2018)
- "Yıkılmam" (2018)
- "Üzülme" (2019)
- "İkimiz Adına" (2020)
- "Yerine" (2024)
- "Sakla" (2025)
- "Yanıldım" (2025)
