= Yonca Evcimik =

Turkish pop singer and actress (born 1963)

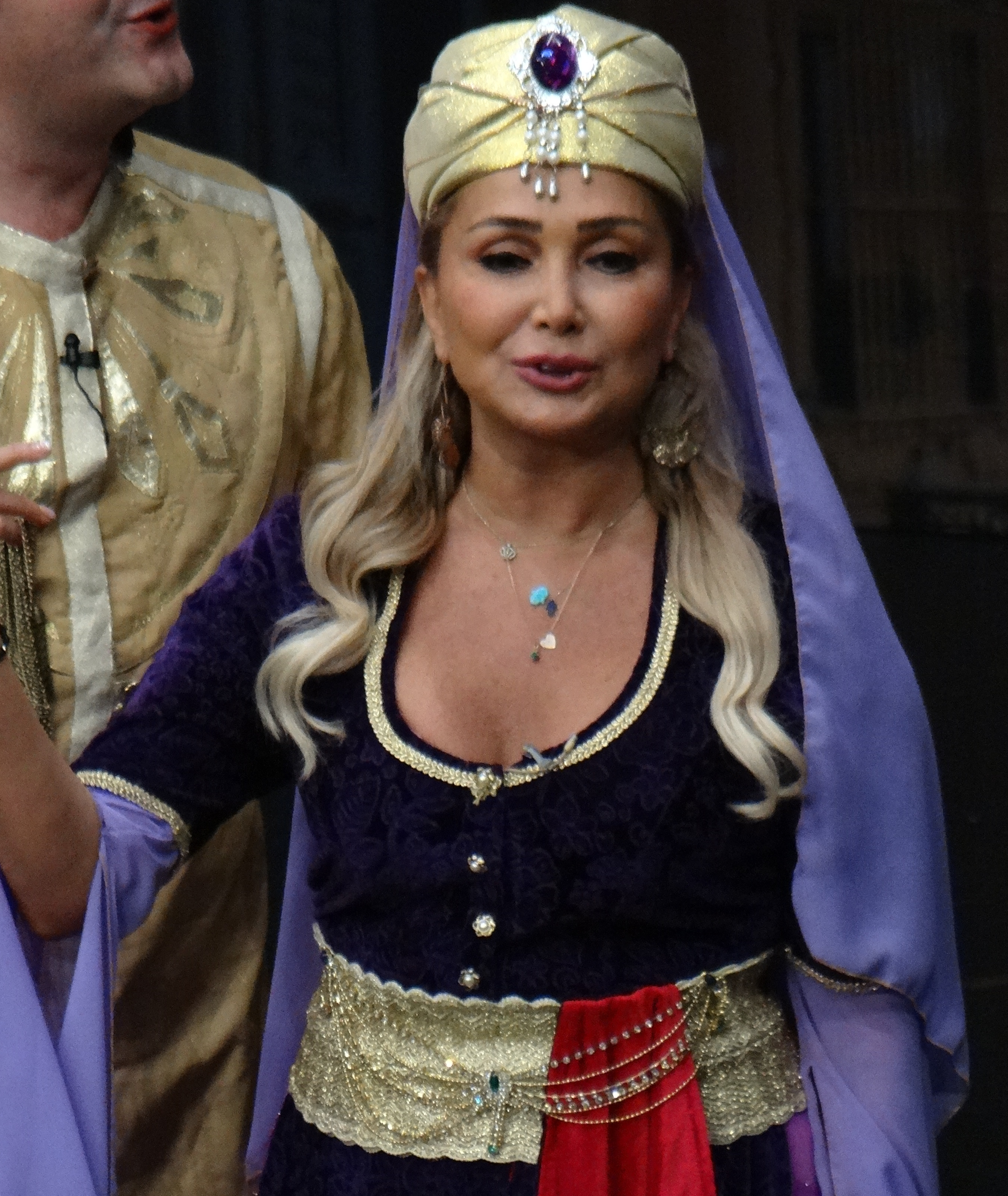
- Evcimik during a theater play in 2017

Background information
- Born: Fatma Yonca Evcimik; 16 September 1963 (age 62); Istanbul, Turkey
- Genres: Pop
- Occupations: Singer, actress, TV hostess
- Years active: 1977–present

Fatma Yonca Evcimik (born 16 September 1963) is a Turkish pop singer and actress.

== Biography ==
Evcimik studied dance and ballet at the Academy of Music at Mimar Sinan University. In an interview, she revealed that she worked as a sales agent for a life insurance company before starting her career. After graduation, she worked at plays as an actress and dancer. She also acted in the films "Hababam Sınıfı Güle Güle" ve "Kızlar Sınıfı".

Her debut album named "Abone" was released in 1991 and was a great success selling around two million copies. "Kendine Gel" was her second album and was released in 1993. Her third album "Yonca Evcimik '94" was released in 1994. In 1995, she released "I'm Hot For You" followed by her fifth album called "Günaha Davet" in 1998. In 2001, she released "Herkes Baksın Dalgasına" and in 2002 a remix album called "The Best of Yoncimix Remixes".

== Discography ==
=== Albums ===
- Abone (1991)
- Kendine Gel (1993)
- Yonca Evcimik '94 (1994)
- I'm Hot For You (1995)
- Günaha Davet (1998)
- Herkes Baksın Dalgasına (2001)
- 15.(2014)

=== Singles and EPs ===
- 8:15 Vapuru (1994)
- Yaşasın Kötülük (1997)
- Aşka Hazır (EP, 2004)
- Oldu, Gözlerim Doldu (2005)
- Şöhret (EP, 2008) - (PopCorn & U.ur)
- Tweetine Bandım (2010)
- Yallah Sevgilim (2012)
- Aha! (2016)
- Kendine Gel (2017)
- Ortaya Karışık (EP, 2017)
- Ayıp Şeyler (2020)
- Vurula Vurula (2022)

=== Featurings ===
- 2002 - Kırmızı Kart feat. Faruk K
- 2005 - Oldu Gözlerim Doldu feat. Sirhot
- 2005 - Oldu Gözlerim Doldu feat. DJ Murad
- 2007 - Gözyaşı feat. Sirhot
- 2008 - Ah Be Yonca feat. Uğur Yıldıran (U.UR)
- 2011 - Seni Hâlâ Seviyorum feat. Çeşitli Sanatçılar (Doğa Rutkay, Bora Öztoprak, Zeyno Gönenç, DJ Hüseyin Karadayı, Yeliz, Deniz Erten, Derya Baykal, Hakan Peker, Burcu Güneş, Metin Özülkü, Ebru Şallı, Tan Sağtürk, Naz Elmas, Metin Arolat, Elif Dağdeviren, Reyhan Karaca, Bahar Korçan, Billur Kalkavan)
- 2012 - Bandıra Bandıra feat. Volga Tamöz
- 2014 - Çok mu Zor? feat. Okay Barış
- 2016 - Kendine Gel feat. İrem Derici & Gökçe

=== Remix albums ===
- The Best of Yoncimix - Remixes (2002)
- Aha! - Remixler (2016)

=== Compilation albums ===
- 5'i Bir Yerde - GOLD (2012)

== Filmography ==
- Golden Girls (TV series) 2009
- You're Cool (TV series) 2010 / Baleci
- Novice Witch (TV series) 2006 /Yonca
- Selena (TV series) 2006
- Çılgın Bediş (TV series) 1996 / Çılgın Bediş
- Mr. E (movie) 1995 / Köylü
- The Class of Girls (movie) 1984 / Nurgül
- Hababam Sınıfı Bye Bye (movie) 1981 / Yonca
