= Ceylan =

Ceylan is a Turkish given name and also surname that means gazelle and may refer to:

== Given name ==
- Ceylan (born 1974), Turkish singer
- Ceylan Arısan (born 1994), Turkish female volleyball player

== Surname ==
- Bülent Ceylan (born 1976), German comedian of Turkish origin
- Ebru Ceylan (born 1976), Turkish photographer, actress, screenwriter and art director
- Ebru Ceylan (volleyball) (born 1987), Turkish volleyball player
- Fatih Ceylan (born 1980), Turkish footballer
- Murat Ceylan (born 1988), Turkish footballer
- Nuri Bilge Ceylan (born 1959), Turkish film director
- Özgür Ceylan (boen 1973), Turkish businessperson and politician
- Rauf Ceylan (born 1976), German sociologist and author of Kurdish descent
- Taner Ceylan (born 1967), German photo-realist artist of Turkish origin
- Ufuk Ceylan (born 1986), Turkish footballer
- Yunus Ceylan (born 1979), Turkish footballer

== See also ==
- Ceylan, Çermik
- Ceylon
- Sri Lanka
