= Ebru =

Ebru may refer to:

== Artform ==
Ebru is the contemporary Turkish word for what is called marbled paper (a method of aqueous surface design, which can produce patterns similar to smooth marble or other kinds of stone) in English.

== People ==
- Ebru Acer (born 2002), Turkish para table tennis player
- Ebru Aydın (born 1973), Turkish singer and songwriter
- Ebru Barutçu Gökdenizler (born 1959), Turkish diplomat and ambassador
- Ebru Ceylan (born 1976), Turkish photographer, actress, screenwriter and art director.
- Ebru Ceylan (volleyball) (born 1987), Turkish volleyball player
- Ebru Dağbaşı (born 2002), Turkish sport wrestler
- Ebru Demir (born 1976), Turkish social entrepreneur and chef
- Ebru Destan (born 1977), Turkish singer, actress, and model
- Ebru Elhan (born 1982), Turkish volleyball player
- Ebru Gündeş (born 1974), Turkish pop-folk singer, actress, and television personality
- Ebru Kavaklıoğlu (born 1970), Turkish long-distance runner
- Ebru Şahin (born 1994), Turkish actress and model
- Ebru Şallı (born 1977), Turkish television personality, model and former pageant
- Ebru Topçu (born 1996), Turkish football player
- Ebru Umar (born 1970), Turkish-Dutch columnist
- Ebru Uzungüney, German-born Turkish footballer
- Ebru Yaşar (born 1977), Turkish pop-folk singer

== Broadcasting ==
- Ebru TV, a former English-language television network based in Turkey that was closed on July 19, 2016 by the Turkish government.
