= David Roxburgh =

Professor of Islamic art history

David Roxburgh is an academic, art historian and the Alwaleed Bin Talal professor of Islamic art history at Harvard University.

== Biography ==
Roxburgh grew up in the Scottish Borders and went on to study at Edinburgh University and Edinburgh College of Art, where he earned an M.A. in Fine Art in 1988, summa cum laude, in a degree program that combined studio practice in sculpture with the history of art. He was admitted to the Ph.D. program in History of Art at the University of Pennsylvania, where he received his degree in 1996 with a dissertation on album-making, collecting, and art under the Timurids and Safavids from 1427 to 1565. The dissertation was awarded first prize in Iranian Studies by the Foundation for Iranian Studies, Washington, D.C., in 1996. His doctoral research was supported by the Thouron Award (1988-89) and fellowships from the Smithsonian Institution (1994-95), the Andrew W. Mellon Predoctoral Fellowship at the Center for Advanced Study in the Visual Arts, National Gallery of Art (1994-96), the Leverhulme Trust (1993-94), and the Samuel H. Kress Foundation (1992-93); he held a J. Paul Getty Trust Postdoctoral Fellowship in 1999-2000.

Roxburgh joined Harvard University as Assistant Professor in July 1996, and was promoted to Associate Professor in 2001 and to Full Professor in 2003. In 2007 he was appointed Prince Alwaleed Bin Talal Professor of Islamic Art History. He served as Director of Undergraduate Studies (2003-07; 2012-13), Director of Graduate Studies (2014-16), and Department Chair (2016-2023). Harvard awarded him an M.A. honoris causa in 2003.

Among his visiting appointments, Roxburgh was Professeur invité at the École des hautes Études en Sciences Sociales, Paris, in 2003; Orion Visitor at the University of Victoria, British Columbia, in 2010-11; Visiting Scholar at the Museum of Islamic Art, Doha, in 2014; Scholar in Residence at the Doris Duke Collection of Islamic Art, Shangri-La, Honolulu, in 2014; and Honorary Professor at the Central Academy of Fine Arts, Beijing, from 2018 to 2023. He was awarded the Walter Channing Cabot Fellowship at Harvard in 2006-07 and 2024-25. In 2026 he received the Farabi International Award for out standing achievements in the Humanities from the Iranian Ministry of Science, Research, and Technology, one of the most prestigious recognitions in the field of Iranian studies.

Roxburgh has held major leadership roles in the profession internationally. He served as President of the National Committee for the History of Art from 2016 to 2021, having previously been its Vice-President (2012-16) and Director (2009-12). He was Vice President of the Comité International d'Histoire de l'Art (CIHA) and a member of the CIHA Executive Committee from 2016-20. He served as Reviews Editor and Editorial Board member of The Art Bulletin (2006-09), and has been a member of the editorial board of Muqarnas: An Annual on the Visual Culture of the Islamic World since 1996. He currently serves on the editorial/advisory boards of Art in Translation (2021–), the Brill series Arts and Archaeology of the Islamic World (2012–), and the International Journal of Persian Literature (2014–).

Roxburgh's scholarship ranges widely across the visual and material culture of the Islamic world from the medieval period to the nineteenth century. His work encompasses the arts of the book and manuscript painting, calligraphy, Qur'anic art, Islamic architecture, aesthetics and the history of reception, exchanges between the Islamic world and China, travel narratives, the history of collecting and exhibiting Islamic art, photography and image-making in nineteenth-century Iran, and the critical writing on art produced with Persianate culture itself.

His first monograph, Prefacing the Image: The Writing of Art History in Sixteenth-Century Iran (Brill, 2001), examined how art-historical discourse was constructed by writers, calligraphers, and collectors in Safavid Iran, recovering a body of critical and biographical writing largely overlooked by earlier scholarship. His second monograph, The Persian Album, 1400-1600: From Dispersal to Collection (Yale University Press, 2005), traced the formation, dispersal, and scholarly rediscovery of the great Timurid and Safavid albums of calligraphy and painting. The book received the Choice Outstanding Academic Titles award (2006) and an honorable mention for the Saidi Sirjani Book Award from the International Society for Iranian Studies (2006). His articles have addressed topics including Timurid mosaic faience and architectural epigraphy in Central Asia, pilgrimage scrolls, the illustrated Arabic manuscripts of al-Hariri and al-Jazari, portraiture, the Timurid-Ming diplomatic embassy of 1419-22, and the nineteenth-century Western reception of Islamic art.

Roxburgh has also made significant contributions through major exhibition projects. He was co-curator of Turks: A Journey of a Thousand Years, 600-1600 at the Royal Academy of Arts, London (January–April 2005), which was shortlisted for The Art Newspaper and AXA Art Best Exhibition Catalogue award. At the Museum of Fine Arts, Houston, he co-curated Traces of the Calligrapher: Islamic Calligraphy in Practice, c. 1600-1900 (2007-08) and curated Writing the Word of God: Calligraphy and the Qur'an (2007-08), both of which subsequently toured to the Asia Society, New York, and the Michael C. Carlos Museum, Emory University. He co-curated Technologies of the Image: Art in 19th-Century Iran at the Harvard Art Museums (2017-18), reviewed by Robyn Creswell in the New York Review of Books, and co-curated Preserved Pages: Book as Art in Persia and India, c. 1300-1800 at the Worcester Art Museum (2018-19). His catalogue An Album of Artists' Drawings from Qajar Iran (Harvard Art Museums/Yale University Press, 2017), based on graduate seminar, won first place from both the New England Museum Association (2018) and the American Alliance of Museums (2017), and was selected for the AIGA 50 Books | 50 Covers list (2017).

Roxburgh's more recent work also extends beyond the Persianate tradition to broader questions of cross-cultural visual transmission and architectural history. He co-edited The Diagram Paradigm: Cross-Cultural Approaches (Dumbarton Oaks, 2022) with Jeffrey Hamburger and Linda Safran, and contributed two essays to the volume, including a study of al-Sufi's tenth-century Book of Forms of the Fixed Stars that exemplifies his characteristics close attention to the material and formal properties of manuscript objects. He is currently preparing three further books: two volumes on the American architecture and scholar Myron Bement Smith—including an edition of Smith's unpublished study of vaulting techniques in Iranian Islamic architecture (Brill, forthcoming 2027)—and a study of art and literature in early fifteenth-century Herat.

== Works ==
Books

- Roxburgh, David J., ed., with introduction and commentary. Vaulting Techniques in Iranian Islamic Architecture, by Myron Bement Smith, edited with additional material by Doğan Y. Kuban. Studies and Sources in Islamic Art and Architecture. Supplements to Muqarnas. Leiden: Brill, forthcoming, 2027.
- Hamburger, Jeffrey, David J. Roxburgh, and Linda Safran, eds. The Diagram Paradigm: Cross-Cultural Approaches. Washington, D.C.: Dumbarton Oaks, 2022.
- Roxburgh, David J., and Mary McWilliams, eds. Technologies of the Image: Art in 19th-Century Iran. Cambridge, MA: Harvard Art Museums, 2017.
- Roxburgh, David J. ed. An Album of Artists' Drawings from Qajar Iran. Cambridge, MA, and New Haven: Harvard Art Museums, distributed by Yale University Press, 2017.
- Roxburgh, David J., ed. Envisioning Islamic Art and Architecture: Essays in Honor of Renata Holod. Leiden: Brill, 2014.
- Roxburgh, David J., and Mary McWilliams. Traces of the Calligrapher: Islamic Calligraphy in Practice, c. 1600-1900. Exhibition catalogue. Houston: Museum of Fine Arts, distributed by Yale University Press, 2007.
- Roxburgh, David J. Writing the Word of God: Calligraphy and the Qur'an. Exhibition catalogue. Houston: Museum of Fine Arts, distributed by Yale University Press, 2007.
- Roxburgh, David J., ed. Turks: A Journey of a Thousand Years, 600-1600. Exhibition catalogue. London: Royal Academy of Arts, 2005.
- Roxburgh, David J. The Persian Album, 1400-1600: From Dispersal to Collection. New Haven: Yale University Press, 2005.
- Roxburgh, David J. Prefacing the Image: The Writing of Art History in Sixteenth-Century Iran. Studies and Sources in Islamic Art and Architecture 9. Leiden, Boston, and Cologne: Brill, 2001.

Articles and book chapters (selected)

- Roxburgh, David J. "Persian Poetry Made Manifest," In Masterpieces of Islamic Art from the Farjam Collection, edited by Sheila R. Canby with Venetia Porter, 2:546-57 and 585-86. London: Yale University Press, 2024.
- Roxburgh, David J. "Al-Sufi's 'Book of Forms of the Fixed Stars' (Kiitāb ṣuwar al-kawākib al-thābita): Between Illustrated Book, Scientific Instrument, and Firmament." In The Diagram Paradigm: Cross-Cultural Approaches, edited by Jeffrey Hamburger, David J. Roxburgh, and Linda Safran, 167-98. Washington, D.C.: Dumbarton Oaks, 2022.
- Roxburgh, David J. "November 1869: The Suez Canal Inauguration." In Making Modernity: Art and Architecture in the Nineteenth-Century Islamic Mediterranean, edited by Margaret Graves and Alexandra Dika Seggerman, 234-55. Bloomington, IN: Indiana University Press, 2022.
- Roxburgh, David J. "The Arts of the Book and Calligraphy, 1250-1450." In A Companion to Islamic Art and Architecture, edited by Gülru Necipoğlu and Finbarr B. Blood, 2:668-90. Oxford: Blackwell, 2017.
- Roxburgh, David J. Mounia Chekhab-Abudaya and Amélie Couvrat Desvergnes. "Sayyid Yusuf's 1433 Pilgrimage Scroll (Ziyārātnāma) in the Collection of the Museum of Islamic Art, Doha." Muqarnas 33 (2016): 345-407.
- Roxburgh, David J. "In Pursuit of Shadows: al-Hariri's Maqāmāt." Muqarnas 30 (2013): 171-212.
- Roxburgh, David J. "Micrographia: Toward a Visual Logic of Persiante Painting." RES: Anthropology and Aesthetics 43 (2003): 12-30.
- Roxburgh, David J. "On the Transmission and Reconstruction of Calligraphy. Ibn al-Bawwab and History." Studia Islamica 96 (2003): 39-53.
- Roxburgh, David J. "Persian Drawing, ca. 1400-1450: Materials and Creative Procedures." Muqarnas 19 (2002): 44-77.
- Roxburgh, David J. "The Aesthetics of Aggregation: Persian Anthologies of the Fifteenth Century." Princeton Papers: Interdisciplinary Journal of Middle Eastern Studies 8 (2001): 119-42.
- Roxburgh, David J. "Au Bonheur des Amateurs: Collecting and Exhibiting Islamic Art, ca. 1880-1910." Ars Orientalis 30 (2009): 9-38.
- Roxburgh, David J. "Kamal al-Din Bihzad and Authorship in Persiante Painting." Muqarnas 17 (2000): 119-46.
- Roxburgh, David J. "Heinrich Friedrich von Diez and His Eponymous Albums: Mss. Diez A. Fols. 70-74." Muqarnas 12 (1995): 112-36.
