= Ahmet Vakur Gökdenizler =

Turkish diplomat

Ahmet Vakur Gökdenizler (born 25 August 1956) is a Turkish diplomat who served as Turkey's ambassador to the International Civil Aviation Organization (ICAO), South Africa and Australia.

== Early life and education ==
Ahmet Vakur Gökdenizler was born on 25 August 1956 in the Kadıköy district of Istanbul. He graduated from Kadıköy Maarif College in 1975. After high school, he continued his education at Boğaziçi University, earning a degree from the Faculty of Administrative Sciences, Department of Political Science, in 1979. Two years after graduating, Gökdenizler began working at the Ministry of Foreign Affairs.

== Career ==
From 1988 to 1990, he served as the chief of staff to the minister of foreign affairs, and from 1995 to 1997, he was the head of department and deputy chief of staff to the president of Turkey Süleyman Demirel. Between 1997 and 2001, he served as the consul general in Houston, followed by roles as the head of the Aviation Department (2001–2004) and deputy director general of maritime and aviation affairs (2004–2006). From 15 December 2006 until 30 June 2010, he served as the permanent representative to the International Civil Aviation Organization (ICAO). He was ambassador to South Africa from 15 July 2010 until 19 August 2012. In December 2012, he was appointed director general of bilateral political affairs and maritime & aviation affairs. He was ambassador to Australia from 30 September 2015 until 9 January 2019.

== Personal life ==
He is retired and is married to ambassador Ebru Barutçu Gökdenizler.
