= History of Islamic art =

Islamic art encompasses the visual arts produced in the Islamic world from the 7th century to the present day. It includes architecture, calligraphy, painting, ceramics, metalwork, and textiles created across a vast geographic area stretching from the Iberian Peninsula and North Africa to Central Asia and the Indian subcontinent.

The origins of Islamic art lie in the early centuries of Islam, when artists adapted and synthesized influences from Byzantine, Sasanian, and late antique Mediterranean traditions. Over time, a distinctly Islamic visual language emerged, characterized by the arabesque, geometric patterning, and the integration of calligraphy as a major decorative element. Because Islamic doctrine discouraged figurative representation in religious contexts, artists channeled creative energy into abstract ornamentation, architecture, and the applied arts.

Islamic art developed across several major historical periods and empires, including the Umayyad, Abbasid, Fatimid, Seljuq, Mamluk, Ottoman, Mughal, and Safavid dynasties, each contributing regional styles and technical innovations. Significant contributions include Iznik ceramics, Persian manuscript painting, Mughal hardstone carving, and monumental mosque architecture. From the 18th century onward, Islamic art came under increasing European influence, while contemporary artists in the Islamic world continue to engage with and reinterpret this rich heritage.

== Beginnings ==
=== Pre-dynastic ===
The period of a rapid expansion of the Islamic era forms a reasonably accurate beginning for the label of Islamic art. Early geographical boundaries of the Islamic culture were in present-day Syria. It is quite difficult to distinguish the earliest Islamic objects from their predecessors in Persian or Sasanian and Byzantine art, and the conversion of the mass of the population, including artists, took a significant period, sometimes centuries, after the initial spread of Islam. There was, notably, a significant production of unglazed ceramics, witnessed by a famous small bowl preserved in the Louvre, whose inscription assures its attribution to the Islamic period. Plant motifs were the most important in these early productions.

Influences from the Sassanian artistic tradition include the image of the king as a warrior and the lion as a symbol of nobility and virility. Bedouin tribal traditions mixed with the more sophisticated styles of the conquered territories. For an initial period coins had human figures in the Byzantine and Sassanian style, perhaps to reassure users of their continued value, before the Islamic style with lettering only took over.

=== Umayyad ===
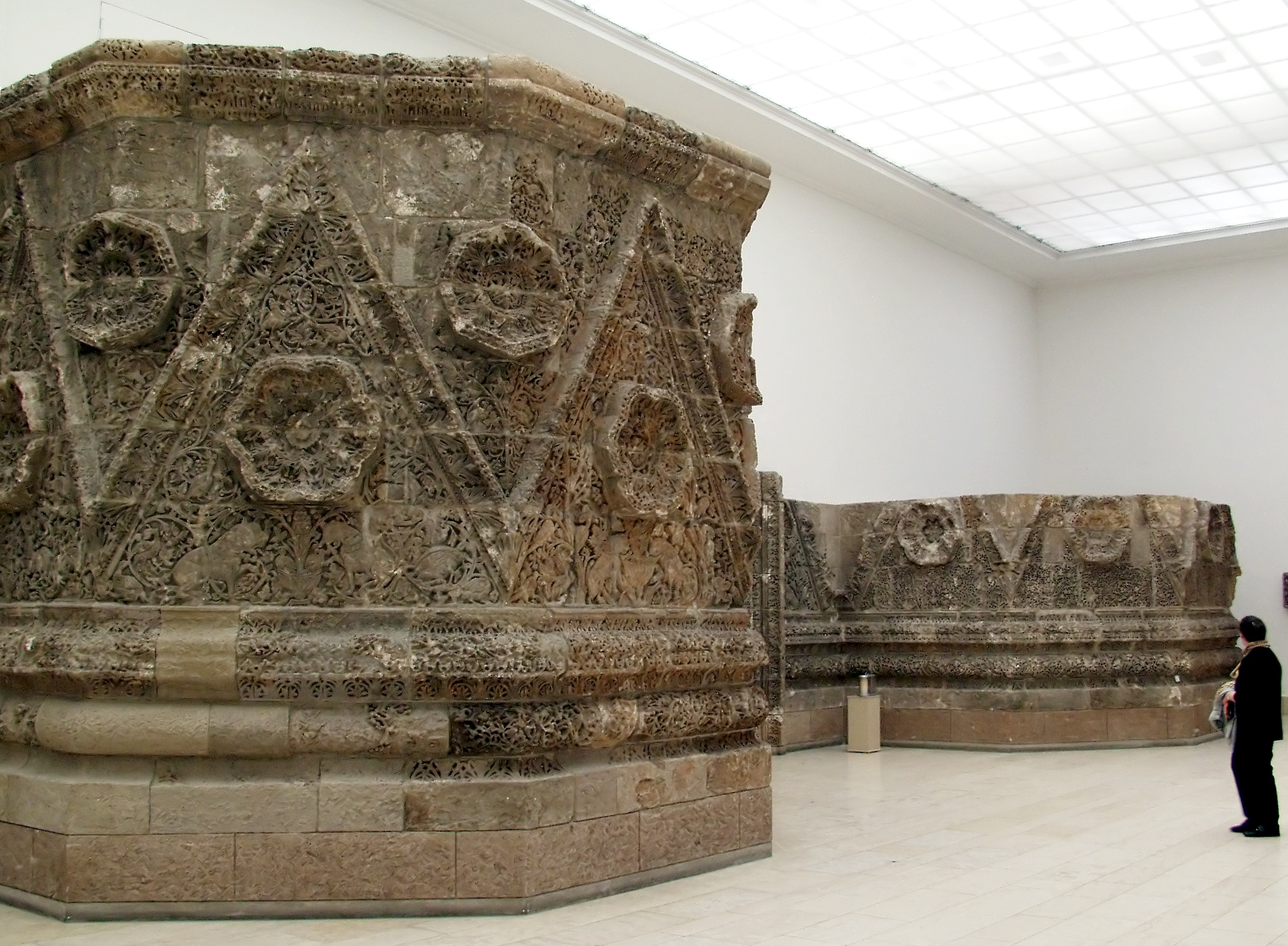
Palace façade from Mshatta in Jordan, now in the Pergamon Museum, Berlin, c. ?740

Religious and civic architecture were developed under the Umayyad Caliphates (661–750), when new concepts and new plans were put into practice.

The Dome of the Rock in Jerusalem is one of the most important buildings in all of Islamic architecture, marked by a strong Byzantine influence (mosaic against a gold ground, and a central plan that recalls that of the Church of the Holy Sepulchre), but already bearing purely Islamic elements, such as the great epigraphic frieze. The desert palaces in Jordan and Syria (for example, Mshatta, Qusayr 'Amra, and Hisham's Palace) served the caliphs as living quarters, reception halls, and baths, and were decorated, including some wall-paintings, to promote an image of royal luxury.

Work in ceramics was still somewhat primitive and unglazed during this period. Some metal objects have survived from this time, but it remains rather difficult to distinguish these objects from those of the pre-Islamic period.

'Abd al-Malik introduced standard coinage that featured Arabic inscriptions, instead of images of the monarch. The quick development of a localized coinage around the time of the Dome of the Rock's construction demonstrates the reorientation of Umayyad acculturation. This period saw the genesis of a particularly Islamic art.

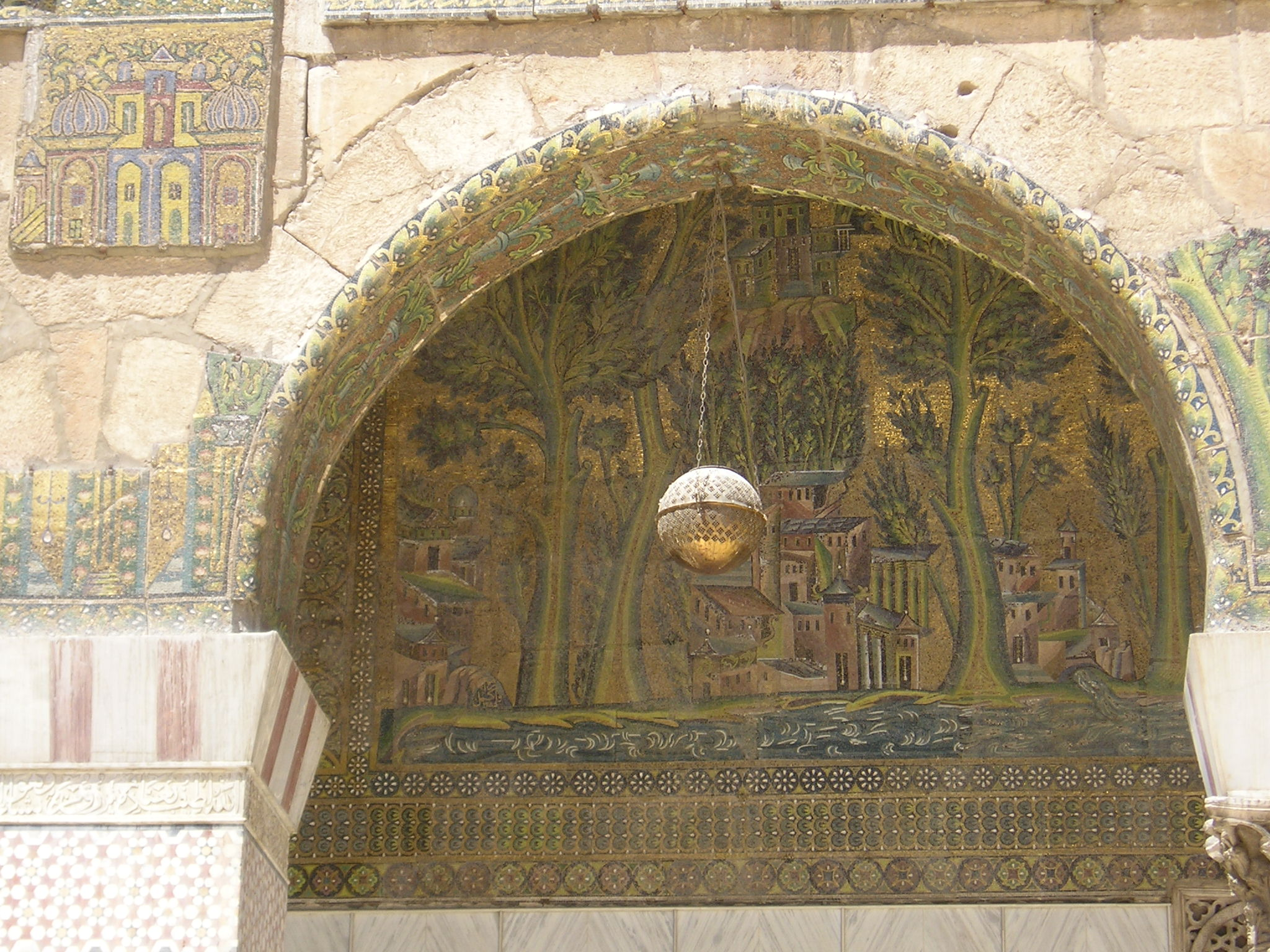
Mosaics from the riwaq (portico) of the Umayyad Mosque

In this period, Umayyad artists and artisans did not invent a new vocabulary, but began to prefer those received from Mediterranean and Iranian late antiquity, which they adapted to their own artistic conceptions. For example, the mosaics in the Umayyad Mosque of Damascus are based on Byzantine models but replace the figurative elements with images of trees and cities. The desert palaces also bear witness to these influences. By combining the various traditions that they had inherited, and by readapting motifs and architectural elements, artists created little by little a typically Muslim art, particularly discernible in the aesthetic of the arabesque, which appears both on monuments and in illuminated Qurans.

Some Umayyads commissioned erotic art for private settings. The Umayyad caliph Al-Walid II built the Qusayr Amra, as his country retreat, whose decoration includes naked females and love scenes.

=== Abbasid ===
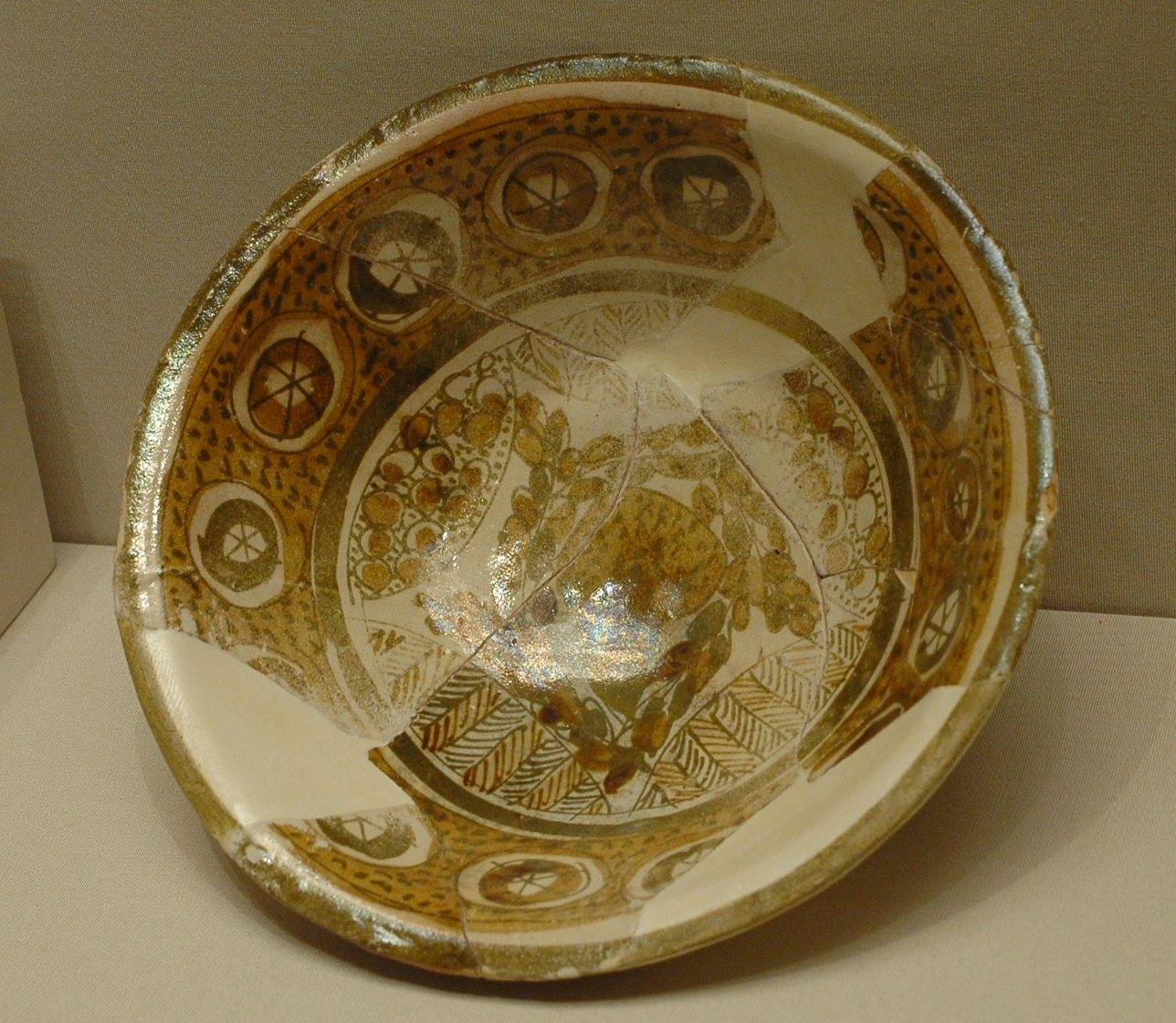
Lusterware bowl from Susa, 9th century, today in the Louvre

The Abbasid Caliphate (750–1258) witnessed the movement of the capital from Damascus to Baghdad, and then from Baghdad to Samarra. The shift to Baghdad influenced politics, culture, and art. Art historian Robert Hillenbrand (1999) likens the movement to the foundation of an "Islamic Rome", because the meeting of Eastern influences from Iranian, Eurasian steppe, Chinese, and Indian sources created a new paradigm for Islamic art. Classical forms inherited from Byzantine Europe and Greco-Roman sources were discarded in favor of those drawn from the new Islamic hub. Even the design of the city of Baghdad placed it in the "navel of the world", as 9th-century historian al-Ya'qubi wrote.

The ancient city of Baghdad cannot be excavated well, as it lies beneath the modern city. However, Abbasid Samarra, which was largely abandoned, has been well studied, and is known for its surviving examples of stucco reliefs, in which the prehistory of the arabesque can be traced. Motifs known from the stucco at Samarra permit the dating of structures built elsewhere, and are furthermore found on portable objects, particular in wood, from Egypt through to Iran.

Samarra witnessed the "coming of age" of Islamic art. Polychrome painted stucco allowed for experimentation in new styles of moulding and carving. The Abbasid period also coincided with two major innovations in the ceramic arts: the invention of faience, and of metallic lusterware. Hadithic prohibition of the use of golden or silver vessels led to the development of metallic lusterware in pottery, which was made by mixing sulphur and metallic oxides to ochre and vinegar, painted onto an already glazed vessel and then fired a second time. It was expensive, and difficult to manage the second round through the kiln, but the wish to exceed fine Chinese porcelain led to the development of this technique.

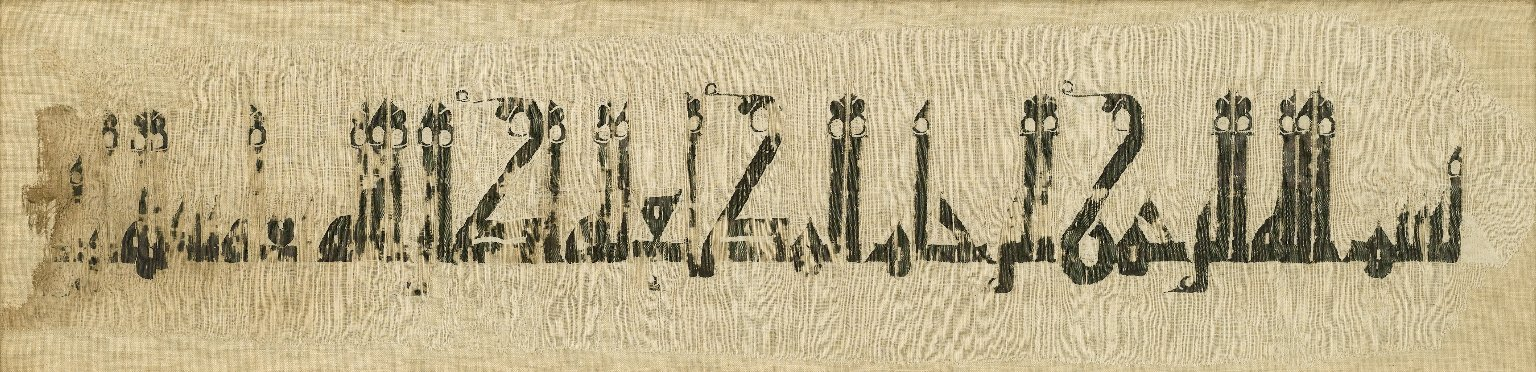
Tiraz Textile Fragment, 946–974 Brooklyn Museum

Though the common perception of Abbasid artistic production focuses largely on pottery, the greatest development of the Abbasid period was in textiles. Government-run workshops known as tiraz produced silks bearing the name of the monarch, allowing for aristocrats to demonstrate their loyalty to the ruler. Other silks were pictorial. The utility of silk-ware in wall decor, entrance adornment, and room separation was not as important as its cash value along the Silk Road.

Islamic calligraphy began to be used in surface decoration on pottery during this period. Illuminated qur'ans gained attention, letter-forms now more complex and stylized to the point of slowing down the recognition of the words themselves.

== Medieval period (9th–15th centuries) ==
Beginning in the ninth century, Abbasid sovereignty was contested in the provinces furthest removed from the Iraqi center. The creation of an Ismaʻili Shiʻi dynasty, that of the North African Fatimid Caliphate, followed by the Caliphate of Córdoba in the Iberian Peninsula, gave force to this opposition, as well as small dynasties and autonomous governors in Iran.

=== Spain and the Maghreb ===
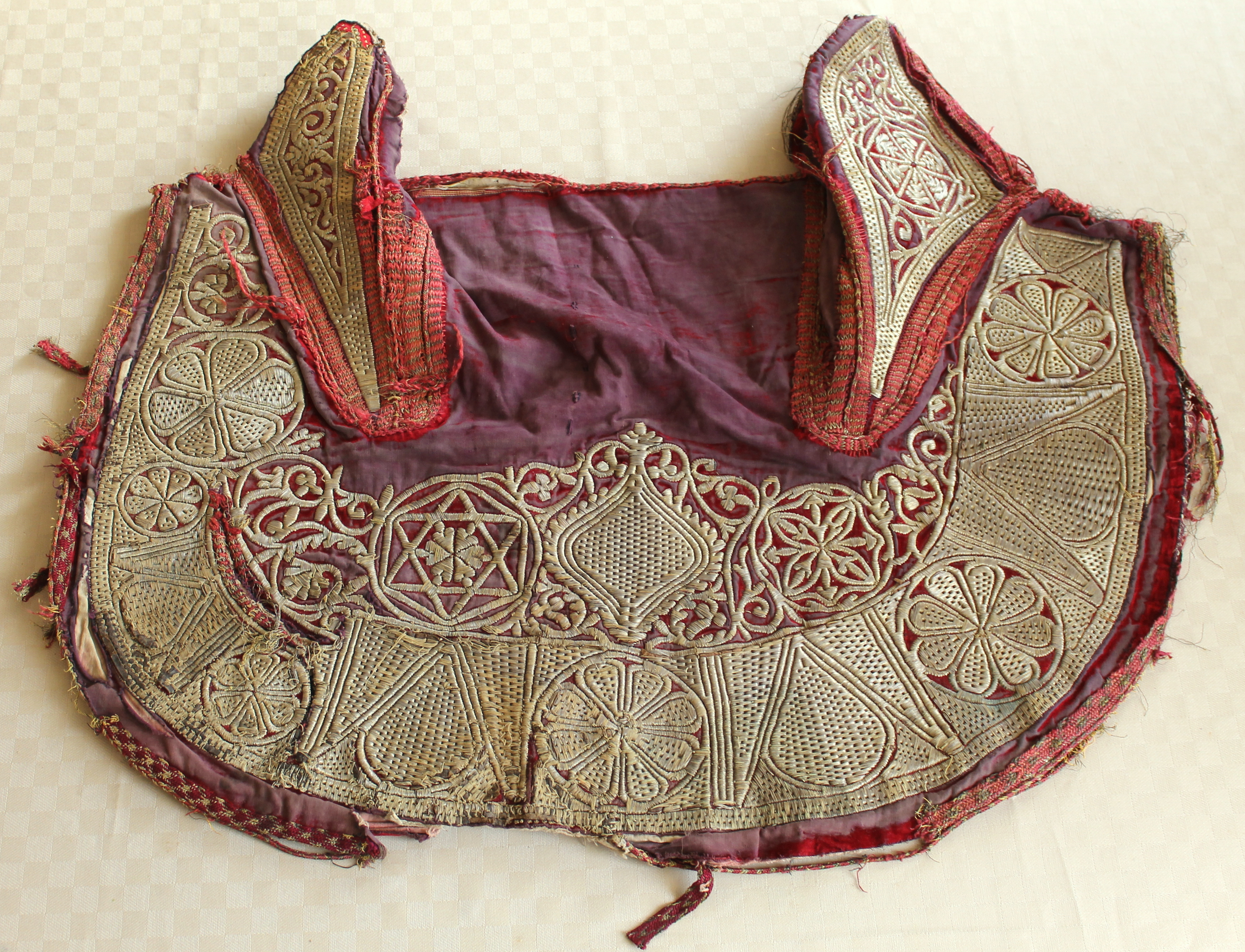
Moroccan Embroidery fly mask

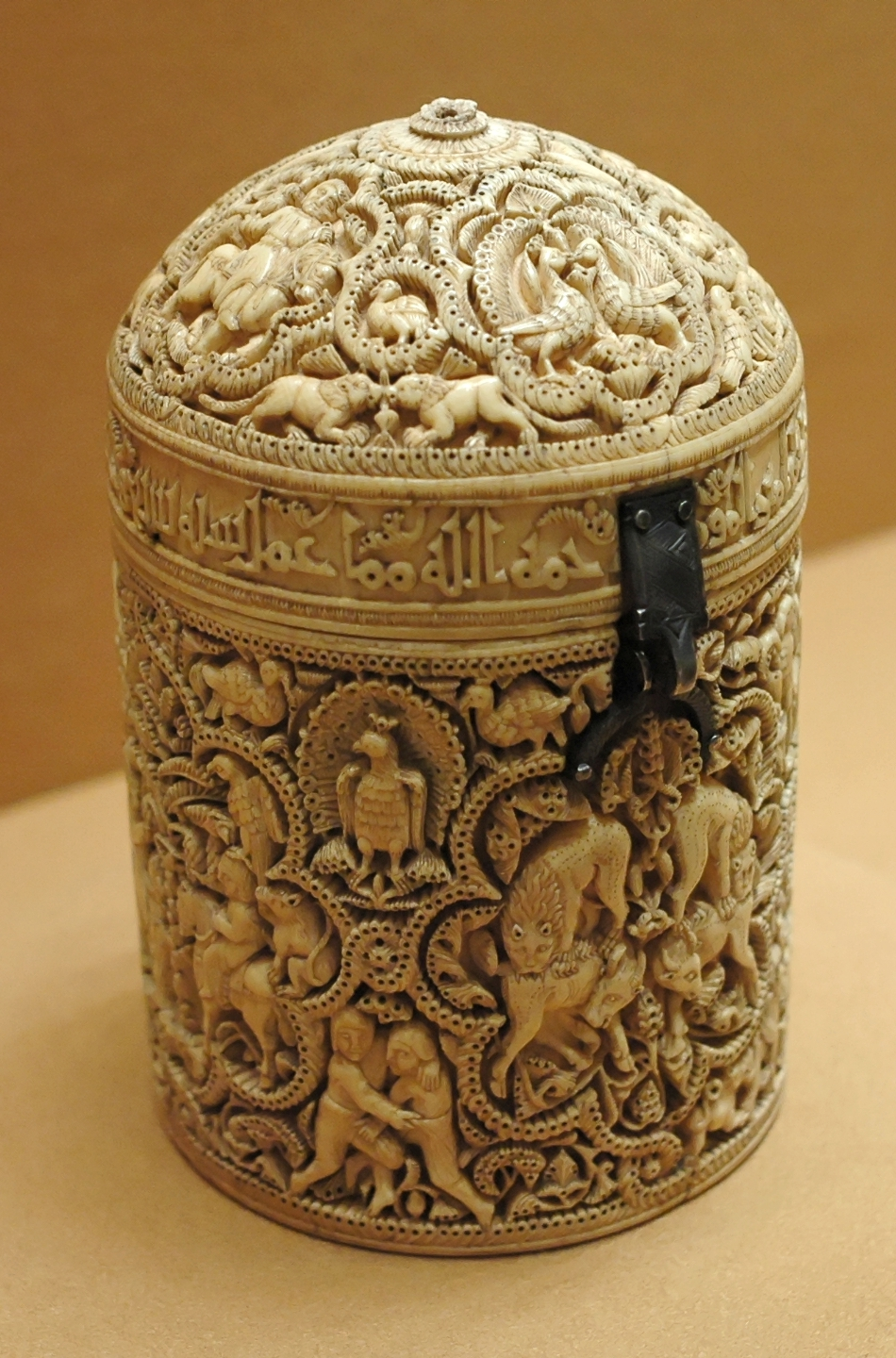
Pyxis of al-Mughira, Medina Azahara, Spain, 968

The first Islamic dynasty to establish itself in Iberia, known in Arabic as al-Andalus, was the Umayyads, descended from the great Umayyad Caliphate of Syria. After their fall, they were replaced by various autonomous kingdoms, the taifas (1031–91), but the artistic production from this period does not differ significantly from that of the Umayyads. At the end of the 11th century, two Berber tribes, the Almoravids and the Almohads, captured the head of the Maghreb and Spain, successively, bringing Maghrebi influences into art. A series of military victories by Christian monarchs had reduced Islamic Spain by the end of the 14th century to the city of Granada, ruled by the Nasrid dynasty, who managed to maintain their hold until 1492.

Al-Andalus was a great cultural center of the Middle Ages. Besides the great universities, which taught philosophies and sciences yet unknown in Christendom (such as those of Averroes), the territory was an equally vital center for art.

Many techniques were employed in the manufacture of objects. Ivory was used extensively for the manufacture of boxes and caskets. The pyxis of al-Mughira is a masterwork of the genre. In metalwork, large sculptures in the round, normally rather scarce in the Islamic world, served as elaborate receptacles for water or as fountain spouts. A great number of textiles, most notably silks, were exported: many are found in the church treasuries of Christendom, where they served as covering for saints' reliquaries. From the periods of Maghrebi rule one may also note a taste for painted and sculpted woodwork.

The art of north Africa is not as well studied. The Almoravid and Almohad dynasties are characterized by a tendency toward austerity, for example in mosques with bare walls. Nevertheless, luxury arts continued to be produced in great quantity. The Marinid and Hafsid dynasties developed an important, but poorly understood, architecture, and a significant amount of painted and sculpted woodwork.

=== Arab Mashriq ===
The Fatimid Caliphate, which reigned in Egypt from 909 to 1171, introduced crafts and knowledge from politically troubled Baghdad to their capital of Cairo.

By 1070, the Seljuq Empire emerged as the dominant political force in the Muslim world after they liberated Baghdad and defeated the Byzantines at Manzikert. During the rule of Malik-Shah I, the Seljuks excelled in architecture at the same time in Syria, the atabegs (governors of Seljuk princes) assumed power. Quite independent, they capitalized on conflicts with the Frankish crusaders. In 1171, Saladin seized Fatimid Egypt, and installed the transitory Ayyubid dynasty on the throne. This period is notable for innovations in metallurgy and the widespread manufacture of the Damascus steel swords and daggers and the production ceramics, glass and metalwork of a high quality were produced without interruption, and enamelled glass became another important craft.

In 1250, Mamluks seized control of Egypt from the Ayyubids as the Mamluk Sultanate, and by 1261 had managed to assert themselves in Syria as well; their most famous ruler was Baibars. The Mamluks were not, strictly speaking, a dynasty, as they did not maintain a patrilineal mode of succession; in fact, Mamluks were freed Turkish and Caucasian slaves, who (in theory) passed the power to others of like station. This mode of government persevered for three centuries, until 1517, and gave rise to abundant architectural projects; many thousands of buildings were constructed during this period. Patronage of luxury arts favored primarily enamelled glass and metalwork and is remembered as the golden age of medieval Egypt. The Baptistère de Saint Louis in the Louvre is an example of the very high quality of metalwork at this period.

=== Iran and Central Asia ===
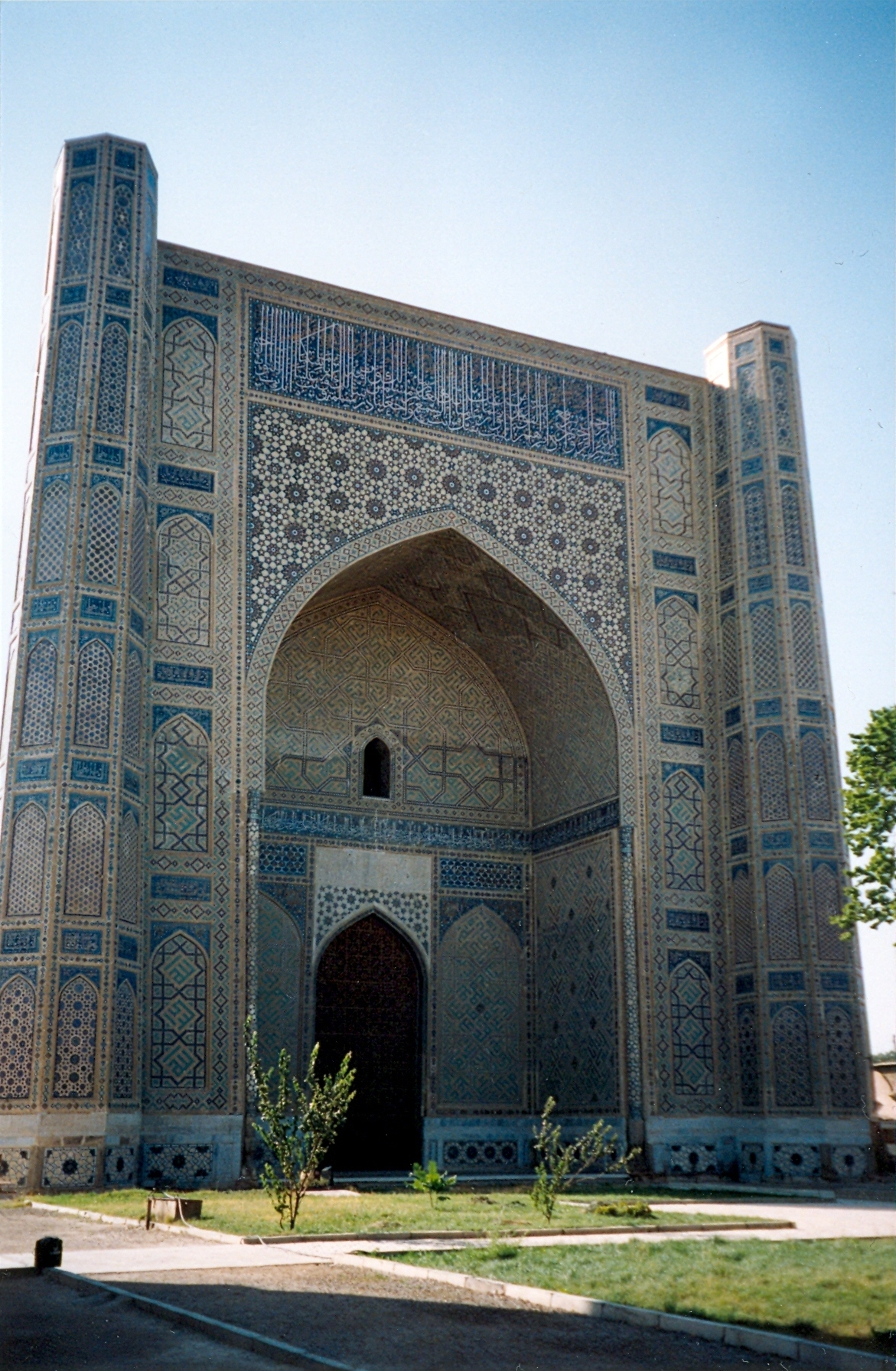
Bibi-Khanym Mosque, Samarkand, Uzbekistan, built by Timur in 1399

Iran and the north of India, the Tahirids, Samanids, Ghaznavids, and Ghurids struggled for power in the 10th century, and art was a vital element of this competition. Great cities were built, such as Nishapur and Ghazni, and the construction of the Great Mosque of Isfahan (which would continue, in fits and starts, over several centuries) was initiated. Funerary architecture was also cultivated, while potters developed quite individual styles: kaleidoscopic ornament on a yellow ground; or marbled decorations created by allowing colored glazes to run; or painting with multiple layers of slip under the glaze.

The Seljuqs, nomads of Turkic origin from present-day Mongolia, appeared on the stage of Islamic history toward the end of the 10th century. They seized Baghdad in 1048, before dying out in 1194 in Iran, although the production of "Seljuq" works continued through the end of the 12th and beginning of the 13th century under the auspices of smaller, independent sovereigns and patrons. During their time, the center of culture, politics and art production shifted from Damascus and Baghdad to Merv, Nishapur, Rayy, and Isfahan, all in Iran.

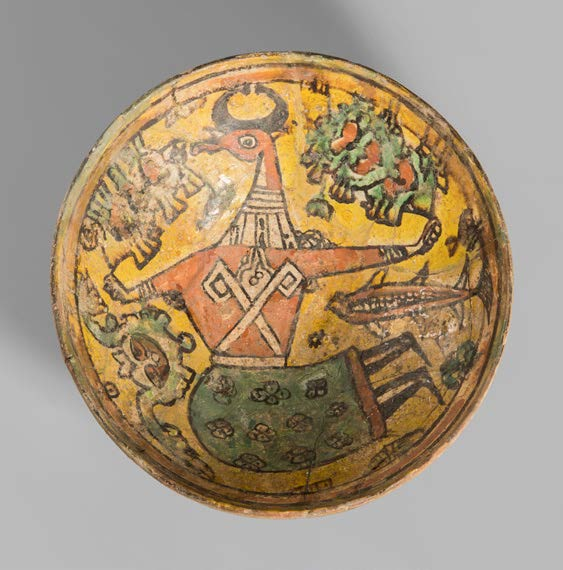
Ceramic bowl decorated with slip beneath a transparent glaze, Gorgan, 9th century CE, Early Islamic period, National Museum of Iran

Popular patronage expanded because of a growing economy and new urban wealth. Inscriptions in architecture tended to focus more on the patrons of the piece. For example, sultans, viziers, or lower-ranking officials were often mentioned in inscriptions on mosques. Meanwhile, growth in mass market production and sale of art made it more commonplace and accessible to merchants and professionals. Because of increased production, many relics have survived from the Seljuk era and can be easily dated. In contrast, the dating of earlier works is more ambiguous. It is, therefore, easy to mistake Seljuk art as new developments rather than inheritance from classical Iranian and Turkic sources.

Innovations in ceramics from this period include the production of minai ware and the manufacture of vessels, not out of clay, but out of a silicon paste ("fritware"), while metalworkers began to encrust bronze with precious metals. Across the Seljuk era, from Iran to Iraq, a unification of book painting can be seen. These paintings have animalistic figures that convey strong symbolic meaning of fidelity, treachery, and courage.

During the 13th century, the Mongols under the leadership of Genghis Khan swept through the Islamic world. After his death, his empire was divided among his sons, forming many dynasties: the Yuan in China, the Ilkhanids in Iran and the Golden Horde in northern Iran and southern Russia.

==== Ilkhanids ====
A rich civilization developed under these "little khans", who were originally subservient to the Yuan emperor, but rapidly became independent. Architectural activity intensified as the Mongols became sedentary, and retained traces of their nomadic origins, such as the north–south orientation of the buildings. At the same time a process of "iranisation" took place, and construction according to previously established types, such as the "Iranian plan" mosques, was resumed. The art of the Persian book was also born under this dynasty, and was encouraged by aristocratic patronage of large manuscripts such as the Jami' al-tawarikh by Rashid-al-Din Hamadani. New techniques in ceramics appeared, such as the lajvardina (a variation on luster-ware), and Chinese influence is perceptible in all arts.

==== The Golden Horde and the Timurids ====
The early arts of the nomads of the Golden Horde are poorly understood. Research is only beginning, and evidence for town planning and architecture has been discovered. There was also a significant production of works in gold, which often show a strong Chinese influence. Much of this work is preserved today in the Hermitage.

The beginning of the third great period of medieval Iranian art, that of the Timurids, was marked by the invasion of a third group of nomads, under the direction of Timur. During the 15th century this dynasty gave rise to a golden age in Persian manuscript painting, including renowned painters such as Kamāl ud-Dīn Behzād, but also a multitude of workshops and patrons.

=== Syria, Iraq, Anatolia ===
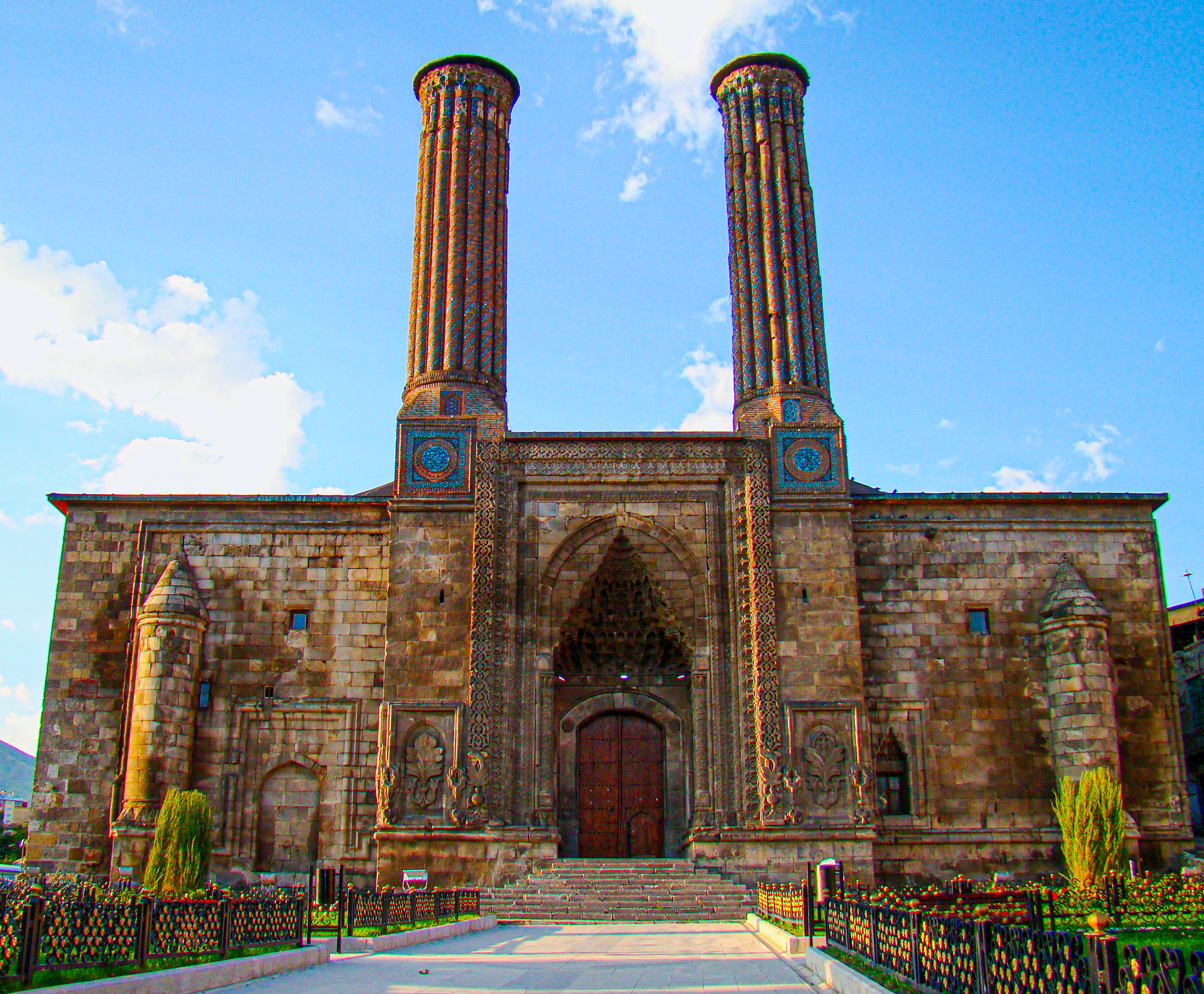
Çifte Minareli Medrese in Erzurum. Before 1265

The Seljuq Turks pushed beyond Iran into Anatolia, winning a victory over the Byzantine Empire in the Battle of Manzikert (1071), and setting up a sultanate independent of the Iranian branch of the dynasty. Their power seems largely to have waned following the Mongol invasions in 1243, but coins were struck under their name until 1304. Architecture and objects synthesized various styles, both Iranian and Syrian, sometimes rendering precise attributions difficult. The art of woodworking was cultivated, and at least one illustrated manuscript dates to this period.

Caravanserais dotted the major trade routes across the region, placed at intervals of a day's travel. The construction of these caravanserai inns improved in scale, fortification, and replicability. Also, they began to contain central mosques.

The Turkmen were nomads who settled in the area of Lake Van. They were responsible for a number of mosques, such as the Blue Mosque in Tabriz, and they had a decisive influence after the fall of the Anatolian Seljuqs. Starting in the 13th century, Anatolia was dominated by small Turkmen dynasties, which progressively chipped away at Byzantine territory. Little by little a major dynasty emerged, that of the Ottomans, who, after 1450, are referred to as the "first Ottomans". Turkmen artworks can be seen as the forerunners of Ottoman art, in particular the "Milet" ceramics and the first blue-and-white Anatolian works.

Islamic book painting witnessed its first golden age in the thirteenth century, mostly from Syria and Iraq. Influence from Byzantine visual vocabulary (blue and gold coloring, angelic and victorious motifs, symbology of drapery) combined with Mongoloid facial types in 12th-century book frontispieces.

Earlier coinage necessarily featured Arabic epigraphs, but as Ayyubid society became more cosmopolitan and multi-ethnic, coinage began to feature astrological, figural (featuring a variety of Greek, Seleucid, Byzantine, Sasanian, and contemporary Turkish rulers' busts), and animal images.

Hillenbrand suggests that the medieval Islamic texts called Maqamat, copied and illustrated by Yahya ibn Mahmud al-Wasiti were some of the earliest "coffee table books". They were among the first texts to hold up a mirror to daily life in Islamic art, portraying humorous stories and showing little to no inheritance of pictorial tradition.

=== Indian subcontinent ===
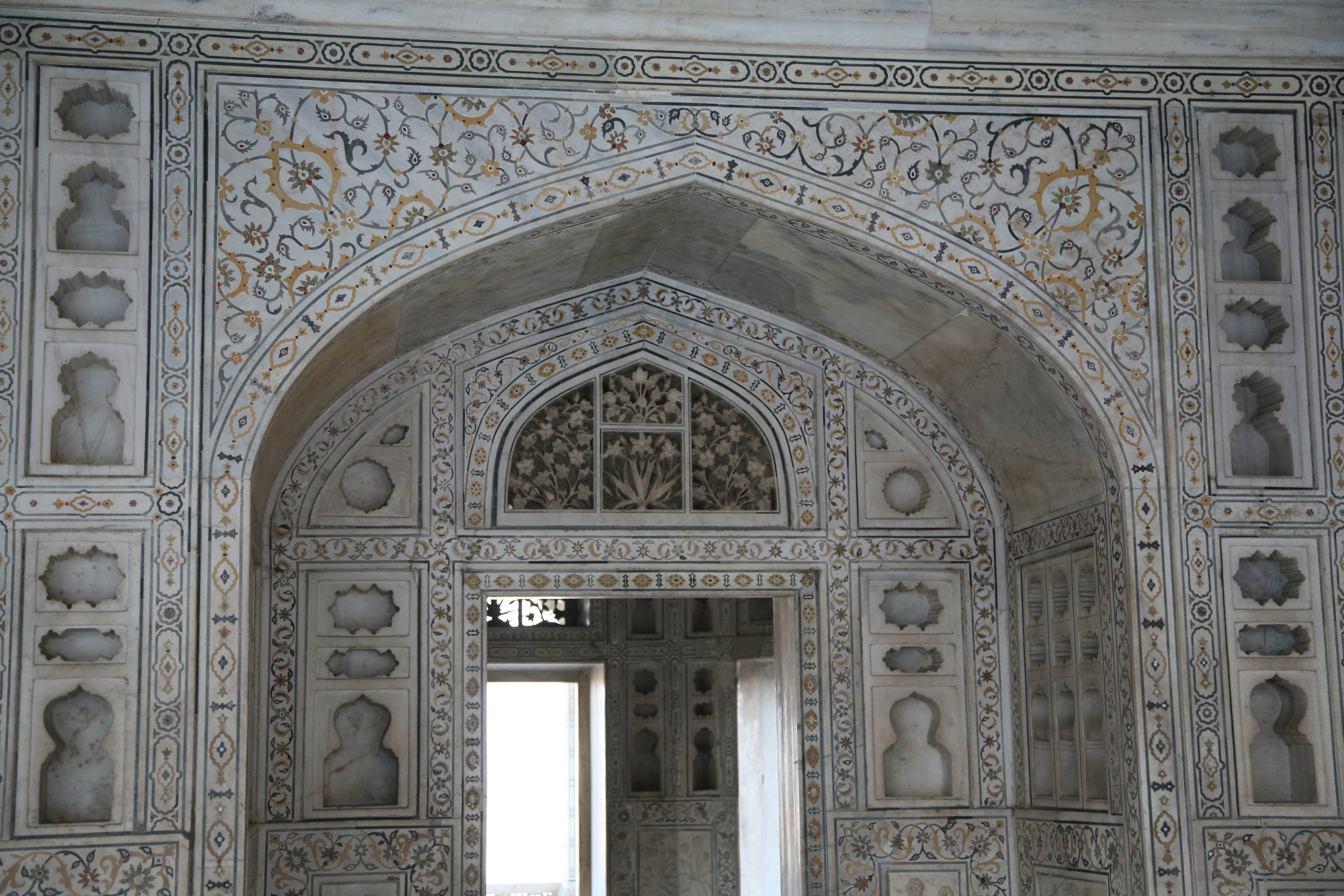
Mughal Arabesque inlays at the Agra Fort, India.

The Indian subcontinent, some northern parts of which conquered by the Ghaznavids and Ghurids in the 9th century, did not become autonomous until 1206, when the Muizzi, or slave-kings, seized power, marking the birth of the Delhi Sultanate. Later other competing sultanates were founded in Bengal, Kashmir, Gujarat, Jaunpur, Malwa, and in the north Deccan (the Bahmanids). They separated themselves little by little from Persian traditions, giving birth to an original approach to architecture and urbanism, marked in particular by interaction with Hindu art. Study of the production of objects has hardly begun, but a lively art of manuscript illumination is known. The period of the sultanates ended with the arrival of the Mughals, who progressively seized their territories.

== Gunpowder empires ==
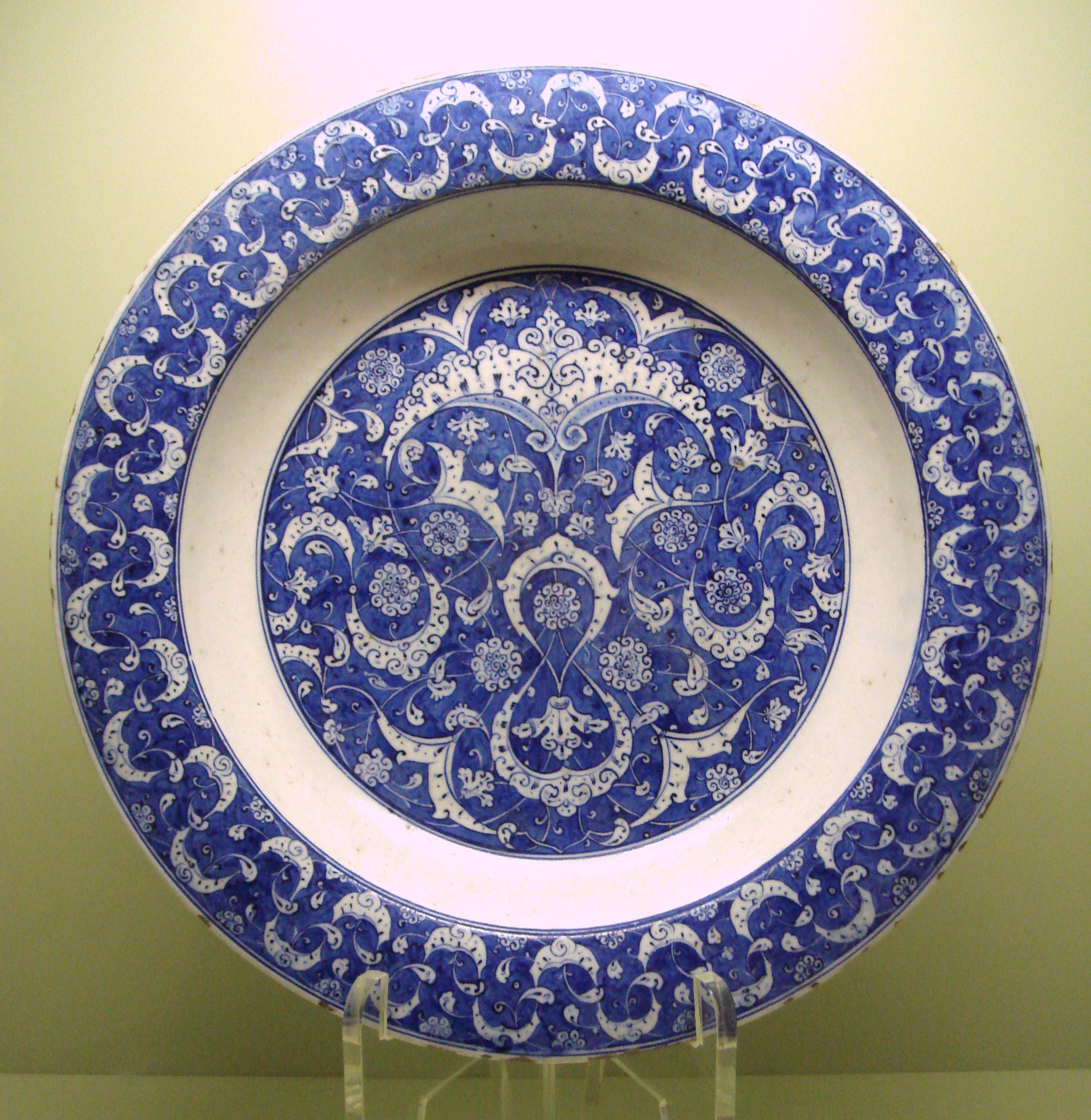
16th century İznik pottery

=== Ottomans ===
The Ottoman Empire, whose origins lie in the 14th century, continued in existence until shortly after World War I. This longevity, combined with an immense territory (stretching from Anatolia to Tunisia), led to a vital and distinctive art, including plentiful architecture, mass production of ceramics for both tiles and vessels (most notably Iznik ware), metalwork, jewelry, Turkish paper marbling Ebru, Turkish carpets as well as tapestries, Ottoman miniatures and decorative Ottoman illumination.

Masterpieces of Ottoman manuscript illustration include the two "books of festivals" (Surname-I Hümayun), one dating from the end of the 16th century, and the other from the era of Sultan Murad III. These books contain numerous illustrations and exhibit a strong Safavid influence; thus they may have been inspired by books captured in the course of the Ottoman-Safavid wars of the 16th century.

The Ottomans are also known for their development of a bright red pigment, "Iznik red", in ceramics, which reached their height in the 16th century, both in tile-work and pottery, using floral motifs that were considerably transformed from their Chinese and Persian models. From the 18th century, Ottoman art came under considerable European influence, the Turks adopting versions of Rococo which had a lasting and not very beneficial effect, leading to over-fussy decoration. European-style painting was slow to be adopted, with Osman Hamdi Bey (1842-1910) for long a somewhat solitary figure. He was a member of the Ottoman administrative elite who trained in Paris, and painted throughout his long career as a senior administrator and curator in Turkey. Many of his works represent Orientalism from the inside, as it were.

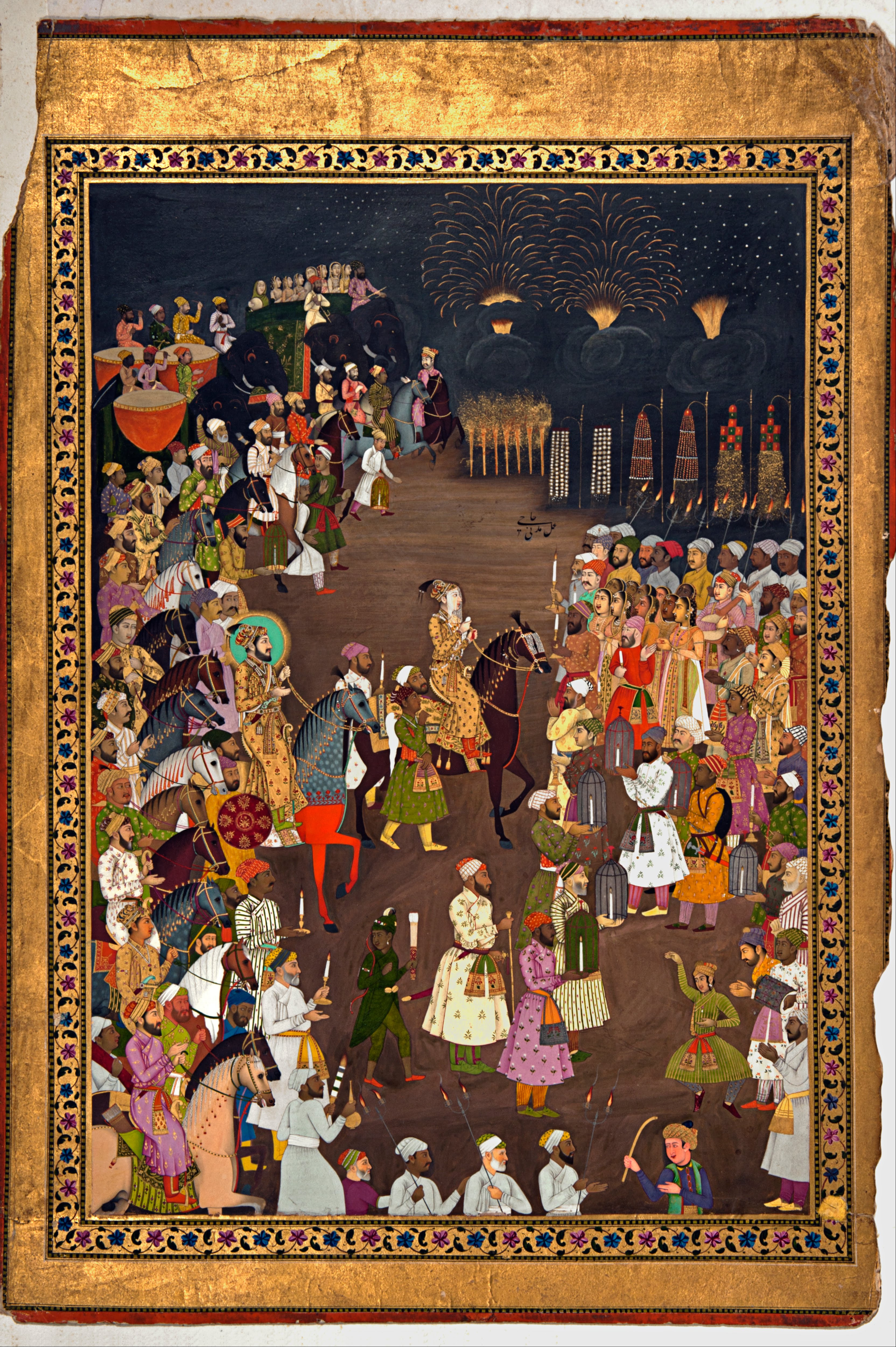
An illustrated manuscript of the Mughal Emperor Shah Jahan attending the marriage procession of his eldest son Dara Shikoh. Mughal-Era fireworks brightened the night throughout the wedding ceremony.

=== Mughals ===
The Mughal Empire in the Indian subcontinent lasted from 1526 until (technically) 1858, although from the late 17th century power flowed away from the emperors to local rulers, and later European powers, above all the British Raj, who were the main power in India by the late 18th century. The period is most notable for luxury arts of the court, and Mughal styles heavily influenced local Hindu and later Sikh rulers as well. The Mughal miniature began by importing Persian artists, especially a group brought back by Humayun when in exile in Safavid Persia, but soon local artists, many Hindu, were trained in the style. Realistic portraiture, and images of animals and plants, was developed in Mughal art beyond what the Persians had so far achieved, and the size of miniatures increased, sometimes onto canvas. The Mughal court had access to European prints and other art, and these had increasing influence, shown in the gradual introduction of aspects of Western graphical perspective, and a wider range of poses in the human figure. Some Western images were directly copied or borrowed from. As the courts of local Nawabs developed, distinct provincial styles with stronger influence from traditional Indian painting developed in both Muslim and Hindu princely courts.

The arts of jewelry and hardstone carving of gemstones, such as jasper, jade, adorned with rubies, diamonds and emeralds are mentioned by the Mughal chronicler Abu'l Fazl, and a range of examples survive; the series of hard stone daggers in the form of horses' heads is particularly impressive.

The Mughals were also fine metallurgists they introduced Damascus steel and refined the locally produced Wootz steel, the Mughals also introduced the "bidri" technique of metalwork in which silver motifs are pressed against a black background. Famous Mughal metallurgists like Ali Kashmiri and Muhammed Salih Thatawi created the seamless celestial globes.

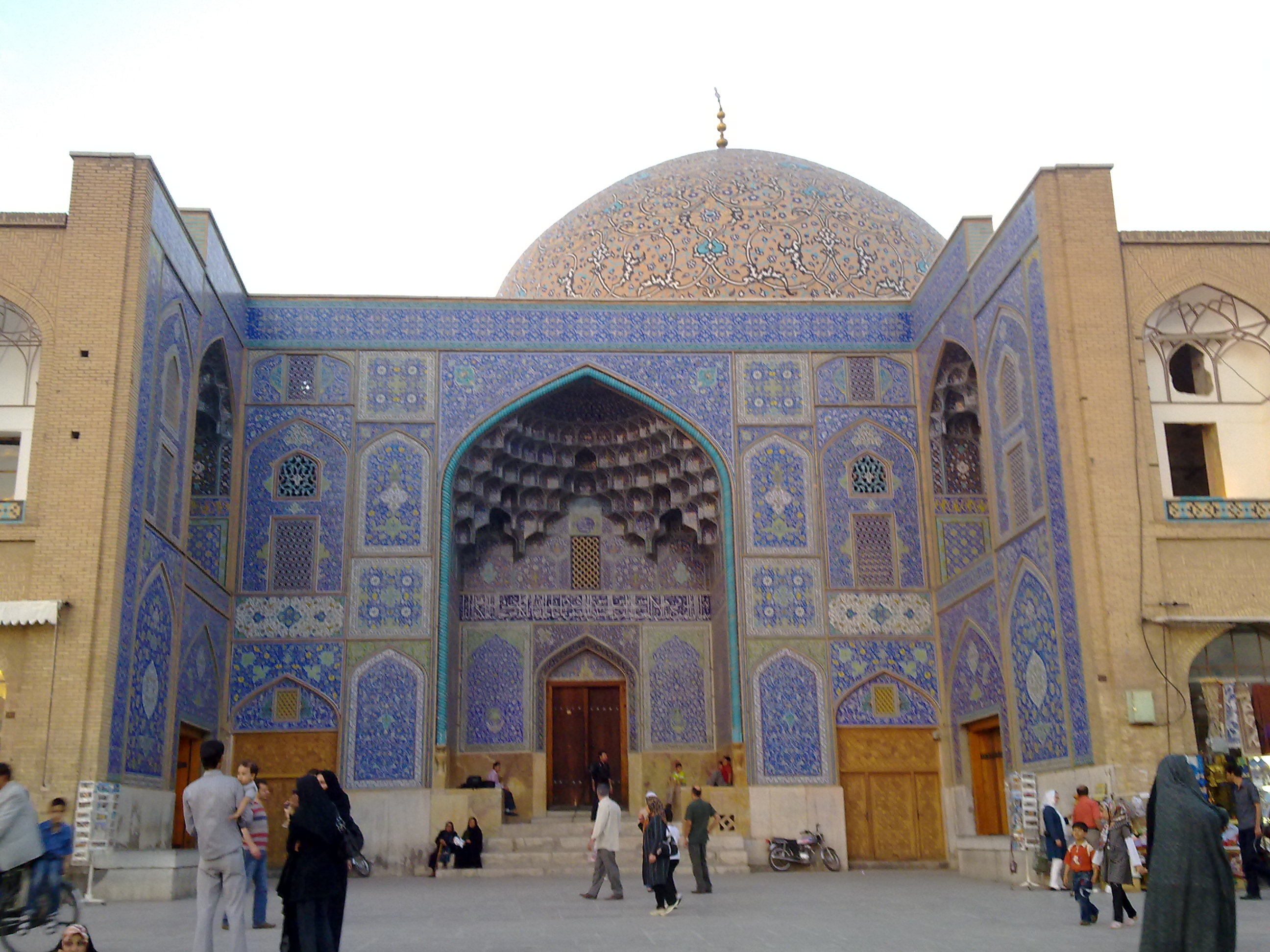
Entrance to Sheykh Lotfollah mosque, Naqsh-e Jahan Square, Isfahan

=== Safavids and Qajars ===
The Iranian Safavids, a dynasty stretching from 1501 to 1786, is distinguished from the Mughal and Ottoman Empires, and earlier Persian rulers, in part through the Shi'a faith of its shahs, which they succeeded in making the majority denomination in Persia. Ceramic arts are marked by the strong influence of Chinese porcelain, often executed in blue and white. Architecture flourished, attaining a high point with the building program of Shah Abbas in Isfahan, which included numerous gardens, palaces (such as Ali Qapu), an immense bazaar, and a large imperial mosque.

The art of manuscript illumination also achieved new heights, in particular in the Shahnameh of Shah Tahmasp, an immense copy of Ferdowsi's epic poem containing more than 250 paintings. In the 17th century, a new type of painting develops, based around the album (muraqqa). The albums were the creations of connoisseurs who bound together single sheets containing paintings, drawings, or calligraphy by various artists, sometimes excised from earlier books, and other times created as independent works. The paintings of Reza Abbasi figure largely in this new art of the book, depicting one or two larger figures, typically idealized beauties in a garden setting, often using the grisaille techniques previously used for border paintings for the background.

After the fall of the Safavids, the Qajars, a Turkmen tribe established for centuries along the Caspian Sea, assumed power. Qajar art displays an increasing European influence, as in the large oil paintings portraying the Qajar shahs. Steelwork also assumed a new importance. Like the Ottomans, the Qajar dynasty survived until 1925, a few years after World War I, when they were replaced by the Pahlavis.

== Modern period ==
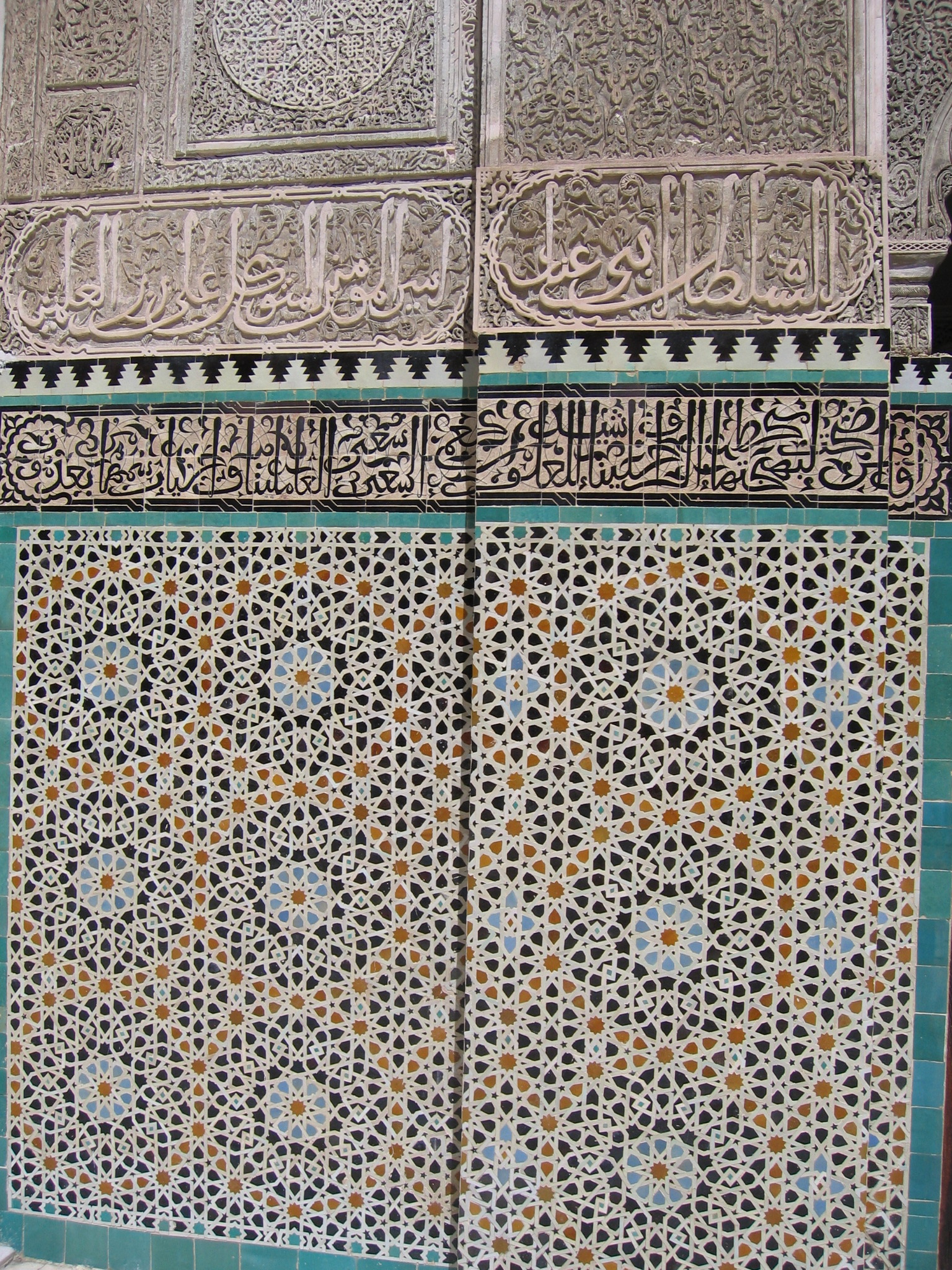
Bou Inania Madrasa, Fes, Morocco, zellij mosaic tiles forming elaborate geometric tessellations

From the 15th century, the number of smaller Islamic courts began to fall, as the Ottoman Empire, and later the Safavids and European powers, swallowed them up; this had an effect on Islamic art, which was usually strongly led by the patronage of the court. From at least the 18th century onwards, elite Islamic art was increasingly influenced by European styles, and in the applied arts either largely adopted Western styles, or ceased to develop, retaining whatever style was prevalent at some point in the late 18th or early 19th centuries. Many industries with very long histories, such as pottery in Iran, largely closed, while others, like metalwork in brass, became generally frozen in style, with much of their production going to tourists or exported as oriental exotica.

The carpet industry has remained large, but mostly uses designs that originated before 1700, and competes with machine-made imitations both locally and around the world. Arts and crafts with a broader social base, like the zelligj mosaic tiles of the Maghreb, have often survived better. Islamic countries have developed modern and contemporary art, with very vigorous art scenes, but the degree to which these should be grouped in a special category as "Islamic art" is questionable, although many artists deal with Islam-related themes, and use traditional elements such as calligraphy. Further, much modern architecture and interior decoration in the Islamic world makes use of motifs and elements drawn from the heritage of Islamic art.
