= Rauf Ceylan =

German-Turkish sociologist and author

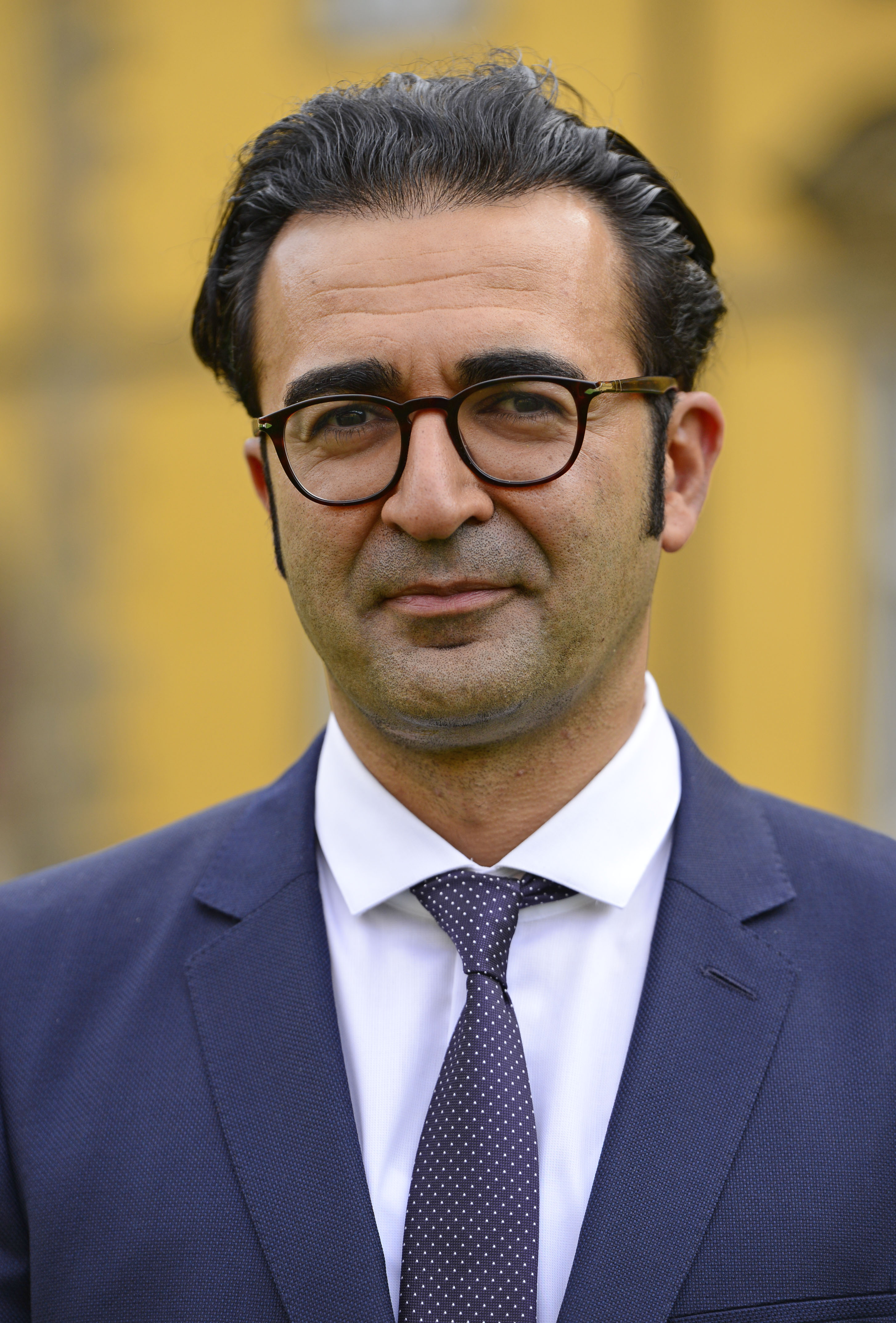
Ceylan in 2019

Rauf Ceylan (born June 19, 1976) is a German-Turkish sociologist and author. He is professor of sociology of religion and sociology of migration at the University of Osnabrück.

== Life and career ==
Ceylan was born into a Kurdish family in Duisburg, Germany. From 1996 to 2001 Ceylan studied at the Faculty of Social and Cultural Studies in Düsseldorf. From 2001 to 2006 he was also a research associate there. He also worked in parallel from 2001 to 2002 at the Institute for Urban and Regional Development and studied at the Ruhr-University Bochum. In 2006 he graduated with magna cum laude on social segregation. Between 2007 and 2009, Ceylan was a research associate in the Department of the Mayor of the City of Duisburg working on Islam, Islamic organizations, migration and social integration of immigrants. Since September 2009 he has lectured at the University of Osnabrück on religious and migration studies within the context of contemporary Islam. Since 2008 he has also trained Turkish imams in Turkey for the Konrad-Adenauer-Stiftung foundation. Ceylan is a member of various scientific committees, including the Institute for Migration Research and Intercultural Studies (IMIS) and the Committee on Migration (RfM).

== Reception of his work ==
Ceylan has authored several publications on contemporary Islam and migration-related research. In his book on ethnic colonies, he describes the role that Turkish mosques and men's cafes play in the integration of migrants of Kurdish origin in Germany.

His most recent publication is an empirical study of the daily lives of Muslim clergy in Germany. The book examines their key position in the Muslim community and how it influences the integration of Muslims into German society. The work also examines Salafist religious extremism especially as an influence on Moslems born in Germany.

== Research Areas ==
Ceylan's scientific focus and publications focus on contemporary Islam and migration. Specific themes include mosques and their social aspects, the role and function of imams, religion and migration, and violence in the name of religion.

== Selected publications ==
Immigration and Socio-Spatial Segregation - Opportunities and Risks of Ethnic Self-Organisation

Muslims in Germany: Religious and Political Challenges and Perspectives in the Diaspora
