= Ebru Barutçu Gökdenizler =

Turkish diplomat

Turkey Ambassador to Portugal
- In office 4 September 2012 – 8 November 2016
- President: Abdullah Gül; Recep Tayyip Erdoğan
- Preceded by: Ali Kaya Savut
- Succeeded by: Mehmet Hasan Göğüş

Personal details
- Born: Ebru Barutçu; 1959 (age 66–67) Ankara, Turkey
- Spouse: Ahmet Vakur Gökdenizler
- Education: American University of Paris
- Profession: Diplomat

Ebru Barutçu Gökdenizler (born 1959), is a Turkish diplomat and ambassador.

== Private life ==
Ebru Barutçu was born in Ankara, Turkey in 1959. She is the grand daughter of politician Faik Ahmet Barutçu (1894–1959). She is married to diplomat and ambassador Ahmet Vakur Gökdenizler.

She completed her secondary education at TED Ankara College, and then graduated from the American University of Paris in France.

== Career ==
Ebru Barutçu Gökdenizler joined the Ministry of Foreign Affairs. She served in the diplomatic missions of Turkey at the United Nations in New York City and in Mexico City. She held various positions in the Ministry, as the Special Advisor to the Minister of Foreign Affairs, in the departments for Multilateral Economic Relations, the European Union, Policy Planning, the Middle East and the Americas. She was the Director General of the Department for the Americas - political and economic relations of North, Central and South American countries before she was appointed Ambassador of Turkey to Portugal. She served there between 4 September 2012 and 8 November 2016. In June 2017, she became Advisor to the Minister of the Foreign Affairs.
