= Yunus Ceylan =

Turkish footballer (born 1979)

Personal information
- Full name: Yunus Murat Ceylan
- Date of birth: 25 December 1979 (age 46)
- Place of birth: Istanbul, Turkey
- Height: 1.81 m (5 ft 11 in)
- Position: Rightback

Team information
- Current team: Beşiktaş U19 (assistant manager)

Senior career*
Years	Team	Apps	(Gls)
1998–2000	Nişantaşıspor	30	(1)
2000–2002	Beşiktaş	0	(0)
2000–2002	→Darıca Gençlerbirliği (loan)	49	(0)
2002–2008	Manisaspor	72	(2)
2006–2007	→Diyarbakırspor (loan)	30	(0)
2008–2010	Adanaspor	43	(3)
2010–2012	Çaykur Rizespor	48	(1)
2012–2014	Güngörenspor	70	(0)
2014–2015	Dikilitaş	24	(2)

Managerial career
- 2019–2020: Beşiktaş U17 (assistant)
- 2020: Beşiktaş U19
- 2020–2021: Adanaspor
- 2022: Beşiktaş U19
- 2022: Beşiktaş Reserves (assistant)
- 2022–: Beşiktaş U19 (assistant)
- * Club domestic league appearances and goals

Yunus Murat Ceylan (born 25 December 1979) is a Turkish professional football manager and former player. He is the assistant coach for the Under-19 squad of Beşiktaş. He played as a rightback for various Turkish clubs.

== Professional career ==
Ceylan began his career with Nişantaşıspor, and moved to Beşiktaş after his debut season. He transferred to Manisaspor in 2002. Ceylan made his professional debut with Manisaspor in a 2-2 Süper Lig tie with Ankaragücü on 7 August 2005.

== Managerial career ==
On 22 September 2020, Ceylan was appointed as the manager for Adanaspor.
