= Ebru Ceylan (volleyball) =

Turkish volleyball player (born 2000)

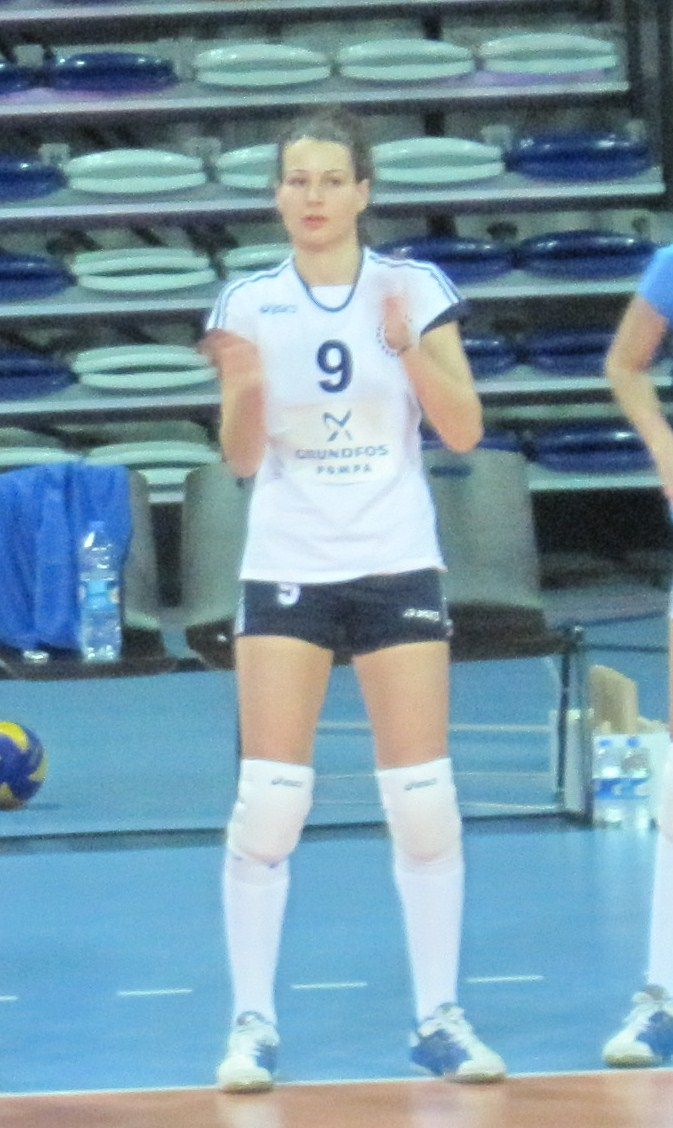
- Ebru Ceylan (December 2010)

Personal information
- Full name: Ebru Ceylan Uygurtaş
- Born: 26 May 1987 (age 39); Ankara, Turkey
- Height: 1.80 m (5 ft 11 in)

Volleyball information
- Position: Outside hitter and libero

Career
Years	Teams
2005-2012; 2012-2013; 2013-2014; 2014-2016; 2016-2017; 2017-2018; 2019-2021	Iller Bankası; Çankaya Belediyesi Anka; Arkas; Çanakkale Belediyespor; İller Bankası; Bolu Belediyespor; TED Ankara Kolejliler

Ebru Ceylan Uygurtaş (born Ebru Ceylan on 26 May 1987), also known as Ebru Uygurtaş, is a Turkish female volleyball player as outside hitter and libero.

== Early life ==
Ebru Ceylan was born in Ankara, Turkey on 26 May 1987. She studied Physical Education and Sport at Gazi University.

== Sport career ==
Ceylan started volleyball playing with her physical education teacher's persistency and support at the age of 14. Although started quite late compared to her peers, she closed the gap in a short time with the belief and help of her coaches. She joined the farm team of İller Bankası Women's Volleyball, where she played three years. Then, she was admitted to the A team of the same club. She played seven seasons with her club.

In 2012, she transferred to Çankaya Belediyesi Anka volleyball team. The next season, she moved to Arkas Club.In the 2014-15 season, she went to Çanakkale Belediyespor, where she played two seasons. In 2016, she returned to her initial club İller Bankası. After one season, she signed with Bolu Belediyespor, and played one season. In 2019, she transferred to TED Ankara Kolejliler.

The 1.80 m (5 ft 11 in) tall sportswoman plays in the outside hitter and libero positions, and has a reach of 270 cm (110 in).
