= Edip Akbayram =

Turkish musician (1950–2025)

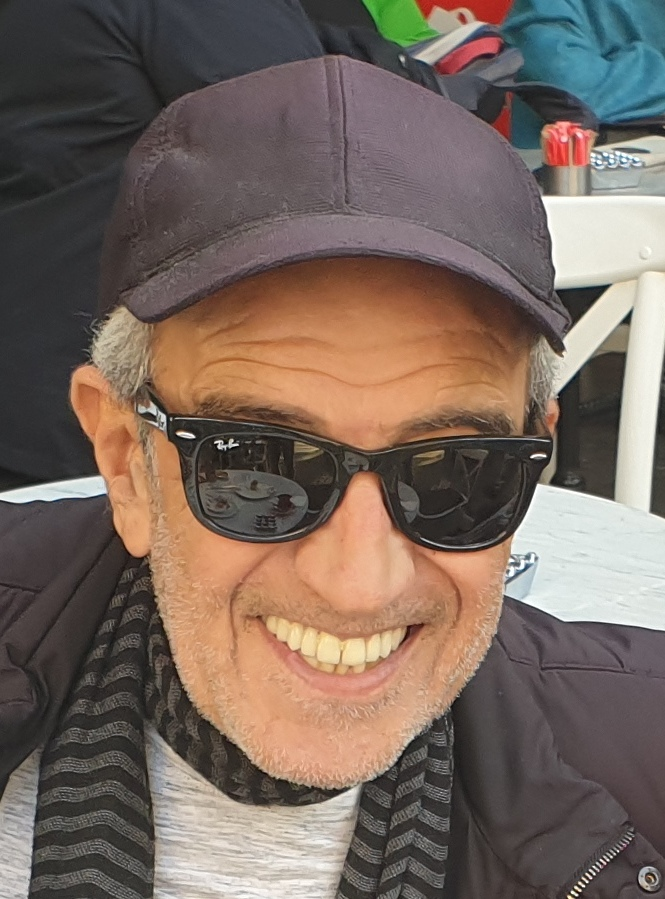
- Akbayram in 2019

Background information
- Born: Ahmet Edip Akbayram; 29 December 1950; Şahinbey, Gaziantep, Turkey
- Died: 2 March 2025 (aged 74) Üsküdar, Istanbul, Turkey
- Genres: Anatolian rock • progressive rock • psychedelic rock • acid rock • hard rock • protest song
- Occupation: Musician • singer • composer
- Instrument: Guitar • bağlama • drums • vocals
- Years active: 1966–2025
- Formerly of: Dostlar • Siyah Örümcekler
- Spouse: Ayten Akbayram (m. 1979–2025)

Ahmet Edip Akbayram (29 December 1950 – 2 March 2025) was a Turkish rock music artist, composer and socialist. He was the lead singer of Dostlar, one of the first rock bands in Turkey. He was excluded throughout his childhood due to polio. During his artistic career, he was censored and oppressed because of his socialist stance. As a result of a disability in his right leg, he was rejected by some groups and organizers due to limited mobility. He reacted to this by saying: "I sing with my voice, I don't sing with my foot. Why are you looking at my feet, brother!"

He was diagnosed with polio when he was nine months old. In the Siyah Örümcekler group they founded in high school, they played and sang psychedelic rock style compositions they made on the folk songs of Pir Sultan and Karacaoğlan. They made their first record Kendim Ettim Kendim Buldum during their high school years. The record was released in two different editions under the titles Siyah Örümcekler – Gaziantep Orkestrası and Edip Albayrak – Siyah Örümcekler. After Gaziantep, Adana became their second address where he first took the stage with the orchestra he founded. Later, he started working in a nightclub called Beyaz Saray there.

After graduating from high school in 1968, he went to Istanbul to take the university entrance exam but failed. He passed the university entrance exam in 1971 and was admitted to faculty of dentistry in Istanbul University, which he had always dreamed of. However, his passion for music took over and he gave up this profession and devoted himself to music. After coming to Istanbul, he participated in the Golden Microphone in 1971. He won the first place with his first composition, Kükredi Çimenler, inspired by a poem by Aşık Veysel in 1972. He founded the Dostlar in 1973 with Vecdi Ören. Later, he received awards with his singles Deniz Üstü Köpürür and Garip, and became an artist whose fame was heard throughout the country. He broke sales records and won the Golden Record with his songs Aldırma Gönül Aldırma and Gidenlerin Türküsü, and has around 250 awards given by various organizations.

The 80s were difficult years for him and other socialist musicians. Between 1981 and 1988, their compositions were banned from being played on the Turkish Radio and Television Corporation, the only broadcaster of the period. But from the mid–90s onwards, he made a new breakthrough, especially with the album Türküler Yanmaz, and showed that he continued to walk on his own path without deviating. This album was dedicated to those who lost their lives in the Sivas Massacre. He died on 2 March 2025, due to multiple organ failure.

== Early life ==
Edip Akbayram was born on 29 December 1950, in the Akyol neighborhood of the Şahinbey district of Gaziantep, as the son of a car mechanic. Growing up in a poor family, Akbayram experienced various hardships at a young age. According to his own account, due to poverty, he could only afford new shoes once every three holidays. When he was just nine months old, he contracted polio, which caused permanent paralysis in his right leg. That leg was shorter and weaker than the other, so he had to walk with a limp. Despite this, he started attending Akyol Primary School in Gaziantep. Since he had difficulty walking to school, his aunt carried him in her arms to and from school. As there was no treatment available, his illness gradually worsened and became permanent. Akbayram, whose childhood was marked by health problems and exclusion, described those days as follows:

I was born in Gaziantep on the eve of a holiday that was not so "ak" (bright), just like my surname. When I was only nine months old, I contracted polio. This cruel disease consumed and devastated me. While other children my age were chasing after a ball, I would sit on the sidelines and watch them. I longed to run and play like them. In my dreams, I was always running. It's such a sorrow that words can hardly express–it must be lived to be truly understood. Sometimes I think, the aching tone of my voice must come from those years. Perhaps that’s why I grew up with a heart scorched by pain.

— Edip Akbayram

Due to his physical disability, he was unable to play games like his peers. He tried to overcome the sense of pessimism brought on by his disability by attending theater plays and concerts. Hoping to cure his leg, Akbayram initially wanted to become a doctor, but during these years, he also began to develop an interest in music. He was inspired by the singers he saw at the concerts he attended and wanted to be like them. In 1968, while attending a concert held as part of the Golden Microphone music contest, he raised his bağlama into the air during the performance of the TPAO Batman and shouted, "I want to be able to play like that, too!" Because of the traumas he had experienced in childhood, he saw music as a form of escape. At home, he would stand in front of a mirror and imitate the singers he had seen at the rock and pop concerts he attended.

After graduating from Gaziantep Atatürk Middle School, he was accepted into Şahinbey Atatürk High School. While attending high school, his music teacher, Mr. Ferit, discovered his vocal talent and gave him significant support on his path to becoming a singer. He included him in the school's marching band and assigned him to conduct the İstiklal Marşı (the Turkish National Anthem) during Monday morning ceremonies. This support played an important role in guiding him toward a musical career. As his passion for music deepened, and with Mr. Ferit's encouragement, he and his friends decided to form a music band. They went to a mechanic's shop, had some welding done, added foot pedals, and built their own drum set. By collecting a broken accordion, a bass guitar, an acoustic guitar, and a snare drum, they officially formed their band in 1966. To attract attention, they named the group Siyah Örümcekler.

== Career ==
=== Early years (1966–1973) ===
==== Siyah Örümcekler ====
During his first performance with the band Siyah Örümcekler at a school event, Edip Akbayram played the drums while also serving as the lead vocalist. At the time when Berkant's Samanyolu had become a national hit, they performed the same song seven times in a single night due to popular demand. They saved the money they earned and used it to have blue jackets and black trousers made, inspired by The Beatles. Their performances were well received, and they began receiving offers to perform at weddings and local events. As demand from nearby cities increased, they eventually performed at Beyaz Saray, a popular nightclub in Adana. Their repertoire included a wide range of artists, from Aşık Veysel to Cem Karaca, Barış Manço to Tom Jones. During rehearsals, they also began composing songs using poems by Pir Sultan Abdal and Karacaoğlan. Akbayram later recalled a memory with his friends Mesut Mertcan and Hasan Bora:

There was a nightclub in Adana called Beyaz Saray (White Palace), owned by Mr. Selahattin. It was the most ambitious nightclub in the south. We used to play dance music there, and afterwards, we would have soup. But we were quite an interesting team. For example, the busboy was Hasan Bora, and he would bring us our soup. The program host was Mesut Mertcan. While drinking our soup, everyone would passionately talk about their dreams. I would say that one day I would become a very good singer. Mesut would talk about how he would become one of the best announcers in the country. And Hasan Bora would claim he would become the king of the entertainment world. Now that I think about it, it means that all three of us truly believed, and because we put our hearts into it, we achieved our goals.

— Edip Akbayram

After graduating from high school, Siyah Örümcekler did not continue and disbanded. Akbayram took the university entrance exam for the first time and went to Istanbul for the exam, but he did not succeed. As he continued with music, he started working with the Gaziantep Orchestra, which was founded by Mehmet Zeki Dinçer and was the first music ensemble in Gaziantep. As he kept singing at weddings and ceremonies, they began receiving performance offers from nearby provinces, especially from Adıyaman and Diyarbakır. The group, which made a name for itself in Southeastern Anatolia, came to an agreement with Aziz Plak, a wholesale record distributor in Gaziantep. Since they did not have enough money, they recorded the single Kendim Ettim Kendim Buldum on the condition that the revenue from the record would be used to cover studio expenses. The record was released under two different titles: "Siyah Örümcekler Edip Albayrak" and "Siyah Örümcekler Gaziantep Orchestra". It attracted more attention than expected in the Southeast and achieved high sales.

==== Nejat Taylan Orchestra ====
In 1970, he took the university entrance exam for the second time, and when he did not succeed again, he found himself in Adana. There, he began working with the Nejat Taylan Orchestra. With the support of the city's local record dealer, Seç Plak, Akbayram entered the studio again with the orchestra and recorded the single İşte Hendek İşte Deve in 1971. However, due to the studio's lack of technical infrastructure, there was an acoustic distortion in the sound recording. The record was released under the name of the orchestra. Afterward, he began to focus on the exams again and came to Istanbul to take the university entrance exam for the third time. There, he was living under very difficult conditions in the basement floor of a cheap hotel with his friends. As the allowance sent by his father was not enough, he began looking for work as a musician. Although he stated that he could play drums and sing, he could not find a job. Unwillingly, he continued to live in hardship in the basement with his friends.

==== His participation in the Golden Microphone ====
Despite not abandoning his dream of becoming a doctor, Akbayram entered the university entrance exam for the third time, under family pressure, and was accepted into the Dentistry Faculty at Istanbul University. He traveled back to Istanbul in 1971 to see the school campus and came across a billboard announcing the revival of the Golden Microphone competition by Günaydın newspaper. This contest had previously launched numerous talents. Inspired, he chose Aşık Veysel's poem Kükredi Çimenler, composed music for it, recorded it at home playing bağlama, and sent it for submission. During this period, his former Siyah Örümcekler bandmates Zeki Dinçer, drummer Cumhur Teker, and guitarist Zafer Doğulu also assisted him.

He felt intimidated by the presence of established names like Salim Dündar, Ömer Aysan, İskender Doğan, Nur Yoldaş, and Kartal Kaan among the contestants, believing that coming from Anatolia was a disadvantage. At that time, he abstained from alcohol and cigarettes, and prepared with milk and honey. He passed the eliminations, performed his song on stage, and then sat aside to listen to other contestants, even quietly evaluating their performances. Suddenly, someone approached and asked, "Son, where are you from?" When he replied Gaziantep, the person asked if he recognized him. Akbayram replied, "I'm new, amateur–I didn't recognize, sir." The man introduced himself as Selmi Andak from Cumhuriyet newspaper, saying: "Let me tell you something: I was on the jury, and I've never heard such a different voice. I gave you a hundred out of a hundred and even put a star on it. You are the winner of this contest, my son." These words brought him immense joy.

He learned he had definitely won while staying in a hotel in Aksaray. A boy serving tea ran over to him, saying, "Edip brother, Edip brother, you're in the newspaper–have you seen it?" At first he didn't believe it, but then he looked and saw his photo at the bottom of the article showing he'd passed the Golden Microphone elimination round. His exact rank didn't matter–the newspaper feature was enough for him. At 22, he told them he would start looking for work with that paper. During the lead-up to the finals, his father initially objected: "I educated you until now – will you become a musician? I won't pay. I'm not sending your allowance." As a result, their dialogue was cut off. But once the newspaper photo appeared, his father phoned and said, "My brave boy, well done." Edip told him he intended to go to the contest but had no suit, asking for money. His father said, "Of course – I'd give my life, son" and sent the money. He used it to buy a black suit and participated in the competition.

In the final, he competed before a 12-member – including Cem Karaca – and won the 1972 Golden Microphone contest by a landslide with 3,350 public votes. As part of his prize, he worked to record Kükredi Çimenler as a single. Since the format required a 45 rpm record, he placed Mahzuni Şerif's Boşu Boşuna on the B–side. The music company paid the necessary copyright fees. During the production, composer Norayr Demirci transcribed and arranged the songs. Accompanied by the Süheyl Denizci Orchestra, Akbayram recorded his first solo single.

The single was released by the İstanbul Plak label, but it failed to attract much attention. Disappointed, he told Norayr Demirci: "What am I to do? I was the winner. I dreamed of so much but this record didn't catch on." Demirci responded, "Son, go back to your hometown Antep." Akbayram snapped back, "I'd kill myself–I'll never go back." Despite these setbacks, he continued his music and signed a two–year contract with one of the era's leading labels, Sayan. He had formed his musical identity, aiming like –Cem Karaca and Fikret Kızılok– to reinterpret folk poets songs in a rock style and reintroduce them to the public. Having earned insufficient income from records to even pay his rent, he realized that winning the Golden Microphone was not enough in itself to change his financial situation.

After winning the contest, he was introduced to the prominent organizer Zeki Tükel, leaving contact information for possible work. Tükel later declined to hire him based on his physical appearance an experience that deeply affected Akbayram. He told Tükel the conditions would change someday and that if Tükel offered him work then, he would decline it which would later happen. Years later, during a difficult financial period, Tükel called with a job offer, but Akbayram refused, citing their past and said that decision gave him great honor.

In the meantime, readers of Hey magazine selected him "Most Promising Male Singer of the Year." He went on his first tour with Selda Bağcan, and in the same year recorded Anam Ağlar Baş Ucumda Oturur with Zafer Dilek. He was then invited to collaborate with Orkestra Dönüşüm, a prominent Anatolian rock band, leading to the single Deniz Üstü Köpürür in 1973. At that time, Moğollar were looking for a vocalist; when Akbayram asked Cahit Berkay not to overlook him, Berkay said they would consider it. Hey magazine published a feature titled "Two vocalists for Moğollar: Ersen Dinleten and Edip Akbayram", but the band chose Ersen for his more energetic style. Akbayram, who was not accepted due to his paralyzed leg, responded: "I sing with my mouth, not my leg!".

Curious about the origin of Boşu Boşuna the song that won him acclaim, he asked the studio staff who owned it. Upon learning it belonged to Mahzuni Şerif, he traveled to his village Berçenek to meet him. During their conversation, Mahzuni Şerif said: "You sang my ugly folk song so beautifully." He granted Akbayram permission to perform his songs for free for life. Following this meeting, Akbayram later said he gained much knowledge about the social and political dimension of art.

=== Dostlar (1973–1988) ===
==== Establishment of Dostlar ====
It was very difficult for an artist who focused on experimental work to find accompanying teams. Since teamwork was important for songs in this line, harmony within the group was very important. Akbayram, who was working in the orchestra Dönüşüm, was experiencing similar difficulties with the bass guitarist in the team, Vecdi Ören. In the end, Ören, who could no longer endure working with that team, made a proposal to Akbayram: "Hey man, your voice is beautiful. Let's form a band together." Afterwards, Akbayram expressed that he wanted them to have a different line and told his thoughts about how much he loved Mahzuni Şerif and how suitable his folk songs were for rock. Then, Akbayram, who accepted the offer, together with Ören, brought in Koral Sarıtaş, Cudi Koyuncu, and Galip Kayıhan according to talent criteria. The group, which was founded in October 1973, was named Dostlar, believing it symbolized love, brotherhood, and commitment.

They gave their first concert at the Ankara Dedeman Cinema and quickly began working on records. During rehearsals, they received help from folk poets and abdals. In October 1973, they released their first single, Değmen Benim Gamlı Yaslı Gönlüme, and the record was chosen as the record of the year in Cyprus. Gaining attention in a short time, the group released their second record, İnce İnce Bir Kar Yağar in 1974. Akbayram's self–titled debut album, Edip Akbayram, was also planned to be released that same year. At this time, Akbayram claimed that Sayan had released a long–play album without his knowledge. While continuing his work with Dostlar in İzmir, he made a statement about the issue: "Sayan has no right to release this long play, we will pursue our rights." Following this statement, the company owner Fahrettin Sayan quickly responded and said: "Such a long play has not yet been released. However, I plan to release it very soon."

Additionally, Sayan, stating that there was still a record debt despite the contract having expired, said, "The release of the mentioned long play is not hindered by the contract made between the singer and me." Later, it was learned that the album would include Boşu Boşuna and Kükredi Çimenler. These songs had first been released under the İstanbul Plak label and were later transferred to Kervan Plak. Then, it was learned that the long-play rights of this single had passed from Kervan to Sayan. The album, a compilation of songs from 1972 to 1974, was released in 1974. Considered one of the first examples of Turkish progressive rock, motif illustrations were used in the album to express its musical theme.

Edip Akbayram and Dostlar decided to part ways during this period of their career, but the separation was short–lived, and the two sides reunited through Hey magazine. During this time, since he held the naming rights of the band, Vecdi Ören attempted to form his own group under the name Dostlar. After the reconciliation, the group participated in the 2nd Mediterranean Music Festival and then performed in a nightclub for a program that lasted approximately fifty days. During this period, Akbayram argued that changes in the lineup were necessary so that the group could undertake more innovative and progressive projects in the future. He had expressed that especially in order for their recent records to move beyond the conventional style, a musical renewal was needed. There were also various structural and contractual issues within the group. As Akbayram's contract with Sayan ended, many record companies began to get in touch with the artist. During this process, Akbayram also considered establishing his own record label. However, it was not yet clear which company he would sign with until the end of the İzmir Fair.

Around the same time, Barış Manço and Kurtalan Ekspres announced that they would part ways after the İzmir Fair, which created an opportunity for a new musical formation. In this context, Edip Akbayram and his manager Celal Tuncel made their first contact with Murat Ses, believing that he would bring a new color to their musical direction. After Ses responded positively to the offer, Özkan Uğur also agreed to join Dostlar due to the absence of a bass guitarist in the group. Additionally, Nadir Uygun, who had previously been in the band Ağrı Dağı Efsanesi founded by Murat Ses, also joined the lineup, becoming a part of Dostlar's new era.

Once this lineup was completed, the second major step was signing with a record label. While it was initially expected that Edip Akbayram would establish a new label under his own name, Yavuz Asöcal, the owner of Yavuz Plak, founded a new record company named Burç Plak. As the company's first artist, Edip Akbayram and Dostlar signed a contract at the Unkapanı Manifaturacılar Bazaar. The founding of a new company at a time when the record market was shrinking and many labels were shutting down was met with surprise in the music circles. Yavuz Asöcal made the following statement on the matter: "Burç Plak will soon take its place alongside the biggest companies. I have not the slightest concern about founding a second company at a time when the record business is heading toward bankruptcy. Within fifteen days, I will transfer the big names of the market to my new label."

After signing the agreement with the newly established Burç Plak, the group released their single Garip. The song won an award in the arrangement category and became one of the hits of the year. During this period, Murat Ses, who was responsible for the group's musical arrangements, also acted as the group's spokesperson. However, during this successful period, the group faced a serious problem. It was revealed that they had been defrauded by their manager Celal Tuncel. This incident created a breach of trust among the group members and they struggled for a long time to recover from the impact of this betrayal. Although the crisis led to internal turmoil and tensions among the members, Edip Akbayram and Dostlar continued their musical production.

When the new lineup did not last long, the group returned to its original lineup, including Vecdi Ören, who had previously tried to form his own group. The single Kolum Nerden Aldın Zinciri, released in 1975, drew attention with its lyrics criticizing the social and political atmosphere of the time. This song was followed in 1976 by the record Mehmet Emmi, based on a work by folk poet Mahzuni Şerif. This record marked a turning point for the group. On the B–side of the record, the song Affetmem Seni also attracted attention. Although the same song had been released by Mahzuni Şerif in a different version, it was partially altered and rearranged for this record. This new version, in which electric guitar motifs were heavily used, attracted great interest from listeners and earned numerous awards for the group members.

==== 1976 Samsun Concert Incident ====
In 1976, Edip Akbayram and the band Dostlar gave a concert at the Samsun Fair. After the concert, Akbayram, who was heading to the train station, was suddenly attacked by four people in a dark street. Without understanding what was happening, he fell to the ground. The attackers assaulted Akbayram, who tried to protect himself with his hands, with kicks and punches. Especially protecting his leg, which was sensitive due to polio, Akbayram was knocked unconscious and collapsed to the ground after minutes of violent beating, and was taken to the hospital. The attackers fled the scene and their identities could not be determined.

It is known that this attack was carried out because of the protest songs containing social and political criticism that Akbayram intensely performed at that time. Not only his inclusion of banned poet Nazım Hikmet's poems, but also his musical line that was the voice of the oppressed made him a target for some groups. Similarly, different attacks also occurred at concerts during the same period. In some concerts, incendiary materials were thrown on stage, instruments were burned, and stage electricity was cut off to sabotage the performances. Despite all these obstacles, Akbayram was determined to continue his music. He tried not to step back in the face of the attacks he experienced and continued to get on stage and perform his protest music.

==== Nedir Ne Değildir? ====
In 1976, the single Zalim was recorded using synthesizers brought from the Netherlands by Galip Kayıhan. Coming from a financially well–off family, Kayıhan had the opportunity to travel abroad and was thus able to procure various effect pedals and synthesizers from Europe for the band. The technical deficiencies experienced in Turkish studio conditions were largely overcome in this way. During this period, in which high–quality equipment was used, the team entered the studio between July and December 1976 and recorded many long plays. These recordings were used in the album Nedir Ne Değildir?, released in January 1977. In the album, alongside seven new long–play recordings, there were also three previously released 45s.

The album cover was prepared using the illustration technique and was created by taking inspiration from Jethro Tull's 1969 album Stand Up, with its design and puppets. In the middle section of the track Arabam Kaldı Yolda on the album, the speed of the song was altered by manually pulling the reel tapes together with the tonmeister Sıtkı Acim. The exclamations "dehha" and "hayda" in the track were voiced by the band's producer Osman Bayşu (Edip Akbayram's producer for 20 years.)

After the album, the band quietly disbanded due to financial difficulties. With the initiative of then–drummer Ayzer Danga and Akbayram, the reestablished band's team went through a radical change this time. The new team recorded Aldırma Gönül Aldırma, a composition by Kerem Güney, on vinyl in 1977. The same team released Kıymayın Efendiler in 1978 and on the B–side of the single, their own composition Adiloş Bebe. Due to these critical songs, many of the band's concerts were canceled, and they faced numerous attacks on stage. After a difficult year full of fights, the band won a Gold Record with their single Gidenlerin Türküsü, recorded in 1979, which sold over five hundred thousand copies. Akbayram received the award from his producer Yavuz Asöcal as a wedding gift.

==== During the 12 September Military Coup period ====
One of the well–known songs of the period, Kıymayın Efendiler, was performed by Edip Akbayram and Dostlar in almost every concert. However, in 1979, during a concert organized by Osman Diper, one of the well–known organizers of the time, a problematic incident occurred. The hall where the concert was held was located beneath the Ülkü Ocakları (Grey Wolves), and on the day of the concert, the venue was completely full. The profile of the audience appeared different from the usual concertgoers, and this situation created unease among the artists. Akbayram took the stage with the song Kıymayın Efendiler. At that moment, great tension arose among the audience. Tension spread among the spectators, and some chanted slogans such as "Give us Edip" and attempted to climb the stage and attack the crew.

As the incident escalated dangerously, organizer Diper quickly took Akbayram off the stage and brought him backstage. After the incident, Sezen Aksu came on stage and tried to perform her song Sevenlerin Sağı Solu Belli Olmaz, but the crowd did not calm down, and Aksu also had to leave the stage. The artists and crew were trapped inside, while the angry crowd gathered outside began forcing the doors of the venue. It was even claimed that they attempted to set the hall on fire. Due to the seriousness of the incident, military units were informed, and with their intervention, the artists and crew were rescued. Akbayram reported the incident to the then Prime Minister Bülent Ecevit in a letter and later learned that the officers responsible for security at the concert venue had been dismissed. The incident was considered an example of the reactions and security problems faced by artists during that period.

Taking part in many tours and unable to stay away from the stage, Edip Akbayram and Dostlar could not find the time to enter the studio. On 12 September 1980, the group gave a concert at the İzmir Fair but was suddenly expelled on the same day. Due to the political content of his songs, Akbayram was subjected to torture. After the September 12 Coup, he was criticized by some circles because of his socialist views. He was banned from appearing on Turkish Radio and Television Corporation, the only media and broadcasting institution in Turkey. Since he was rejected by many organizers and banned from performing on stage, he faced financial difficulties. He had to sell his wife's wedding bracelets and wedding rings, with her consent. He described those days when he could not afford to buy milk and shoes for his son in an interview as follows:

I was subjected to both material and spiritual embargo. Artists are on the side of peace, look at all the artists in the world, they all use the words peace and love. As artists, we have always been against coups, and these are the fundamental pillars of universalization and modernization. The day after the 1980 coup, I was working at the İzmir Fair. The next day they called me to the accounting office and said, "You got a raise, you're fired. I said, "Why?" They said, "If we keep working with you, they'll shut down our venue." I asked, "What is my crime?" They said, "Your crime is being a leftist." No one hired me until 1985–86, they were all afraid of the coup plotters. TRT imposed a ten–year embargo on me. All the directors who headed TRT at that time implemented their egos and politics through us.

He faced various obstacles for performing critical songs in his concerts. He received death threats from some attackers and felt concerned about his personal safety. To protect himself, he began going out with a gun on his waist and checked under his car for bombs before getting in. During this process, in his own words, he faced various forms of psychological pressure which left lasting effects on him. Some of his songs were evaluated by the National Security Council, formed after the military coup, as "endangering state security" and "spreading destructive ideologies." These reasons were defined as part of the political repression policies applied to various artists during that period. During this time, arrests of leftist artists and intellectuals began. Akbayram was also taken into custody due to the political content of his lyrics and the statements he made during his concerts. In official statements, these remarks were labeled "objectionable," and punitive actions were taken. After being taken into custody, he was arrested in the fall of 1980 and remained in Istanbul Sağmalcılar Prison for five months.

Akbayram, who was periodically arrested and detained, was released after it was determined that he had no affiliation with any organization. Due to political reasons, some record labels refused to work with him. Despite the challenges he faced, he continued to produce music. He took part in labor strikes and areas of resistance by giving concerts at these events. In 1981, he and Dostlar released their final single titled Bugün Bizde Bayram Var. After this period, 45 rpm records gave way to long–play albums.

In 1982, Edip Akbayram was invited as a guest artist and jury member to the High School Music Contest organized by Milliyet newspaper. The event was held at Fenerbahçe High School in Istanbul. During the competition, a high school band consisting of Adnan Ergil, Metin Özülkü, and Mehmet Oylumlu gave an outstanding performance. At that time, the previous lineup of Dostlar had disbanded, and Akbayram was in search of a new team. Impressed by the musical talents of these three young musicians, Akbayram personally approached them and offered to work together. Thus, Adnan Ergil, Metin Özülkü, and Mehmet Oylumlu became the new members of the group. That same year, the group resolved its drummer issue with the addition of Saygun Arpalı, who had previously played with Dostlar in 1979. During this period, Edip Akbayram also began composing songs with his high school classmate Murat Kalaycıoğlu.

While sitting at home one day, he was watching the film Dönüş when he heard a background music that caught his attention. The piece was Hasretinle Yandı Gönlüm. According to his own words, a storm erupted in his mind at that moment, and he thought, "I can sing this song very well." He immediately called his producer and said, "I just listened to the song Hasretinle Yandı Gönlüm. Please find out who owns it, get the necessary permissions, and let's get started on the album right away. I want to make this album quietly before anyone else finds out." Afterward, he obtained the required permissions from Osman Bayşu and decided to include the song in their upcoming album. After a long period of work, the album Nice Yıllara Gülüm was produced.

In 1982, a group of folk dancers from the Edirne Public Education Center's folklore team traveled to the town of Enez in Edirne to perform as part of the "Enez Hunting and Fishing Festival." Their accommodation was arranged at facilities belonging to Istanbul University. While rehearsing for their show, Edip Akbayram and Dostlar, who were also staying at the same facility, observed the rehearsals. After a while, Akbayram approached a member of the folklore team and said, "Let your friends and ours play a basketball match. If you beat us, I'll sing you any folk song you want, all night long." When one of the folklore team members asked, "What will you want from us if you win?" Akbayram replied, "What could we want from lads like you? Just playing basketball with you will be more than enough for us." The offer was accepted, and the match was held. Akbayram and Dostlar lost the game and kept their promise. During the concert, Akbayram performed the songs Eşkiya Dünyaya Hükümdar Olmaz and Aldırma Gönül Aldırma, as requested by the team members. Afterwards, the group began rehearsing for a major concert. In 1983, despite the political climate in Istanbul, they performed at Şan Theatre. Songs from the album they would release the following year were also performed during this concert.

Due to the political atmosphere of the time, Edip Akbayram faced serious obstacles in performing on stage because of his political views. Many organizers were reluctant to invite him. During this period of financial struggle, Akbayram received offers that, in his own words, did not align with his moral or artistic values. He was offered an apartment in exchange for releasing an arabesque–style record or a Kurdish–language album. However, Akbayram emphasized that he prioritized the people and his artistic integrity over commercial gain, and he rejected these offers. During this time, his house was raided, he received threats, and due to financial hardship, he was even forced to sell the wedding rings given at his wedding.

Admiring Yılmaz Odabaşı's poetry, Akbayram supported him in 1984 by covering the printing costs of his first poetry book. However, the printing house that published the book was detained that very day. Although Odabaşı was acquitted forty–five days later, the books were confiscated. The book was finally published a year later. In the following years, Akbayram composed and performed songs based on Odabaşı's poems. Despite the obstacles that followed, he entered the studio with his band and recorded the album 1984, named after its release year. The group, defying the bans, went on to release the album 1985 and continued to produce critical songs without compromising their stance. In 1986, they released the album Yeni Gelen Güne Türkü. The album included Mahzuni Şerif's song Hidayet, with the group aiming to deliver a significant message to humanity.

In 1988, Edip Akbayram signed a joint contract with Bayşu Müzik and Emre Plak. Following this agreement, he released the album Özgürlük in the same year. This was the first album in which Akbayram dropped the name "Dostlar" from the cover. Although the name no longer appeared on the album covers, he continued working with his team both in the studio and during concerts, maintaining the group under the name Dostlar. Due to its strong political content, the album was not broadcast on television or in mainstream media, resulting in modest sales at the time. In the songs Vay Bebem, Büyü, and Kıymayın Efendiler – the latter being a reinterpretation – Akbayram performed vocals alongside pop music artist Banu Kırbağ.

=== Solo years (1988–2025) ===
In 1989, Edip Akbayram continued to partially use the group name "Dostlar" in some of his concerts. Although he referred to his musical ensemble as Dostlar during stage performances in this period, the group name was not officially featured on the released albums. During this transitional phase, musicians Ahmet Koç and Tuncer Tunceli joined the group. Tuncer Tunceli took his first steps towards a solo career through this collaboration by performing on stage with Edip Akbayram. Although not yet involved in studio recordings, both musicians were part of the core team accompanying Akbayram in concert line–ups.

In 1990, with the loosening of bans in Turkey's music industry, Akbayram released the album Şahdamar. The proliferation of private television and radio channels enabled the album to reach a broader audience. The album featured Nazım Hikmet's poem "Bu Memleket Bizim" (This Country is Ours), recited in his own voice. Despite difficulties in having his songs and music videos broadcast due to bans and restrictions, he regained visibility in the music industry with this new album.

In 1991, he released the album Senden Haber Yok, which received positive reception. In the same year, a compilation album titled Hava Nasıl Oralarda? was released, featuring selected songs from Özgürlük and Şahdamar. Through this album, songs from the previously less–heard Özgürlük album reached a wider audience. During this period, music videos began to be aired on Turkish Radio and Television Corporation, albeit in a limited capacity.

In 1992, he released the album Unutamadıklarım, rearranging his old hit songs. This album marked the first time he incorporated elements of electronic music, with all instruments – including computer and arrangement – performed by Adnan Ergil. In 1993, he released the album Bir Şarkın Olsun Dudaklarında. During these years, Akbayram created works that blended Anatolian rock with electronic music elements, becoming more visibly active in the Turkish music scene.

==== Escape from the Sivas Massacre ====
In 1993, Edip Akbayram was invited to the "Pir Sultan Commemoration Events" held at the Madımak Hotel in Sivas. However, as he was scheduled to participate in a program organized by Turkish Radio and Television Corporation, he postponed the invitation by two days. As a result, he narrowly escaped the Sivas Massacre that took place on 2 July 1993, in which 37 people – including Alevi writers, poets, and artists – lost their lives when the Madımak Hotel was set on fire. Akbayram described the incident with the following words:

I was invited to Sivas to give a concert. At the time, I had been banned from TRT for ten years. Just a few days before going to Sivas, I received news from Ankara. They told me that ten of my songs had passed the inspection, and TRT producers started calling me. I said, let's present our songs to our citizens who listen to us, and go to Sivas a couple of days later. If it weren't for that offer from TRT, I would have been at the Madımak Hotel in Sivas. I would have been waiting for my turn to go on stage at the hotel, and maybe I wouldn't be alive today with those souls. I remember them with respect.

— Edip Akbayram

In the period following the Sivas Massacre, Akbayram achieved a major breakthrough in his career with the release of the album Türküler Yanmaz in 1994. In addition to its social and political content, the album was prepared as a tribute to those who lost their lives in the massacre. One of the most notable tracks on the album, Gittin Gideli, was written and composed by Mazlum Çimen, who dedicated the song to his father, Aşık Nesimi Çimen, one of the victims of the Sivas Massacre. Another track from the same album, Aşkolsun Sana Çocuk, was dedicated to Deniz Gezmiş, one of the key socialist figures in Turkey's political history. Maintaining his social consciousness, Akbayram joined the Saturday Mothers sit–in protest on 27 May 1995 at Galatasaray Square in Istanbul, to support those demanding the whereabouts of their forcibly disappeared loved ones.

In 1996, he released the album Güzel Günler Göreceğiz. The song that gave the album its name was nominated in the category of "özgün müzik" (a term in Turkish often used to describe contemporary music rooted in traditional Turkish folk music, original music) at the 3rd Kral TV Video Music Awards in 1997. However, since Ahmet Kaya's song Yakamoz won first place, Güzel Günler Göreceğiz came in second and did not receive an award. Around the same time, in a televised interview about his musical style, he stated: "My musical style is very different. In some places and in the media, it's labeled as 'özgün müzik' or similar terms. But if a person creates good music, I believe it is both authentic and original. As for my own style, I've been doing Anatolian pop folk for years. It's a synthesis of our country's minstrels, troubadours, poets, and authentic folk songs with Western instruments. That's what I call Anatolian pop folk." The following year, in 1997, he released the album Yıllar. Songs like Bu Gecede Bir Hal Var and Gönül Dağı were especially well received.

In 1998, he signed with Prestij Müzik and released the album Dün ve Bugün, in which he reinterpreted some of his earlier classics such as Eşkiya Dünyaya Hükümdar Olmaz, Hasretinle Yandı Gönlüm, and Aldırma Gönül. This project marked a turning point due to its high sales figures and its ability to reach a wide audience. In 1999, the album İlk Günkü Gibi was released. The song Suçlayamazlar on this album drew attention for its criticism of the political administration of the time. These developments in the second half of the 1990s marked a period of resurgence in Edip Akbayram's musical career and showed that he maintained his political stance through his socially and politically themed works.

==== Refusal of Fethullah Gülen's award ====
In 2000, he declined an award offered by the Journalists and Writers Foundation, which was founded by Fethullah Gülen. This foundation was shut down after the coup attempt on 15 July 2016, coup attempt. Although the foundation's head of press stated, "Only two artists rejected our award: Edip Akbayram and Macide Tanır," research revealed that many more artists also declined the offer. It was reported that a total of eleven artists did not accept the award. Akbayram expressed his reason for rejecting the award with the following words: "I did not accept the award because I am an intellectual of this Republic."

In 2001, Edip Akbayram released the album Selam Olsun. The track Yanman mı Gerek from the album drew attention for referencing various historical and social events in Turkey. In 2002, he released his 33rd album titled 33'üncü. The album featured compositions based on poems by prominent Turkish poets such as Sabahattin Ali, Can Yücel, Ahmed Arif, and Yılmaz Odabaşı. The album's repertoire was prepared by Edip Akbayram together with Dostlar group member Galip Kayıhan. Media reports described the album as a work that stood out for its literary content.

In 2004, he released the album Dün ve Bugün 2. In this album, previously performed and charted songs were reinterpreted with new arrangements. Although Edip Akbayram initially stated at the release of the first album in the series that he was doing this concept for the first and last time – because he did not see it as commercially appropriate – he released a second one due to high demand. In 2005, the music label Mod Müzik released a compilation album titled Dün ve Bugün 3, consisting of selected tracks from 33'üncü and Dün ve Bugün 2.

In 2008, the artist released the album Söyleyemediklerim, which brought together songs whose release had been delayed due to various obstacles. The album's repertoire was prepared together with Galip Kayıhan, one of the original members of the Dostlar group. The album included previously performed songs. He performed a duet with his daughter Türkü Akbayram in the track İlle de Memleket. Until this album, Edip Akbayram had not produced a studio album for four years. He explained this wait by saying he was hoping for the music industry in Turkey to reach a better position. However, he was saddened to see that the sector had regressed contrary to expectations during this time. Still, due to high demand from listeners, he stated that he saw it as his duty to produce and began sharing his works with music lovers again.

==== Allegation of a Concert Involving the PKK ====
In the early 2000s, Edip Akbayram faced criticism from certain circles following his participation in a Newroz event. Mehmet Gül, a member of parliament from the Nationalist Movement Party at the time, claimed on a television broadcast that Akbayram had performed at Newroz celebrations in Diyarbakır, where symbols of the PKK were allegedly displayed. Gül also accused Akbayram of performing under similar slogans at events in London, stating, "Then you come and say, 'I love this country very much.' What kind of love is this?"

In response, Akbayram explained that he had attended the event upon the advice of his manager and was unaware of the content and atmosphere in advance. Emphasizing that he had no connection to any terrorist organization, the artist stated, "If you can present a single piece of concrete evidence showing that Edip Akbayram has ever said anything against the Republic of Turkey, the Turkish flag, or his country, I will leave this country and abandon my art. I love this country more than you do." Throughout his artistic career, Akbayram maintained that he opposed all forms of violence and embraced an understanding of art based on peace, freedom, and the brotherhood of peoples.

==== Cancellation of the Strawberry Festival Concert ====
In 2008, the Ereğli Municipality arranged for Edip Akbayram to perform at the Strawberry Festival held on 18 June, the anniversary of Ereğli's liberation. After discussions with his manager, Akbayram agreed to perform at the festival. However, it was later reported that the concert was canceled due to the municipality's political affiliation. In a statement to the local press, he said, "I embrace the people of Ereğli, whose hearts beat with love for Atatürk and enlightenment. I cannot attend because I do not participate in any Justice and Development Party (AKP) events. I ask for their understanding." In another interview on the same topic, he stated that he had previously performed at a concert organized by a municipality of a different political stance, during which he was attacked on stage.

Akbayram, who stated that he did not take part in any events organized by the Justice and Development Party (AKP), also declined an invitation to a breakfast hosted by the prime ministry during the same period. He explained the situation as follows: "The Prime Minister invited artists to a breakfast. I was invited too. I said I would not attend. A week later, I was informed that my financial records for 2006, 2007, 2008, and 2009 would be audited by the Chief Revenue Controller. How can something like this happen?"

He dedicated the song "1 Mayıs," which he had previously recorded in the studio, to workers at the state–owned tobacco company during a television broadcast. In 2011, he performed Mahzuni Şerif's song Sarı Saçlım Mavi Gözlüm, which had been written in praise of Mustafa Kemal Atatürk. This recording was included in the album CHP Kılıçdaroğlu – Bir Islıkta Sen Çal, prepared by Seyhan Müzik. Akbayram's latest studio album Mayıs was released in 2012. The song Seni Seven Öldü (Haberin Var mı?) from the album was written and composed by Hasan Hüseyin Demirel. Demirel had written the piece for a woman he loved but whose feelings were not reciprocated. After reaching an agreement with a member of Akbayram's stage crew, Demirel was able to deliver the song to Akbayram. After its release, Seni Seven Öldü (Haberin Var mı?) became one of the most notable tracks on the album and resurfaced in public attention two years later, following Demirel's suicide by self–immolation after dousing himself with thinner.

==== Final Years in the Studio ====
In 2013, Edip Akbayram performed the song Bana Bir Gül Ver, written by Yılmaz Odabaşı, as part of the compilation album Onurlu Yıllar, which featured various artists. In 2016, he entered the studio for the last time and recorded the song Unutamadım for the compilation album Güzelcan Türküleri. On 28 February 2017, he participated in the memorial concert "Deniz 70 Yaşında" (Deniz at 70) and performed the song Aşkolsun Sana Çocuk in memory of Deniz Gezmiş.

As a member of the board of directors of MÜYORBİR (Professional Union of Music Interpreters), Akbayram received the Nazım Hikmet Friendship Award in 2019, presented by the Nazım Hikmet Foundation of Culture and Arts. He was awarded the prize by artist Zülfü Livaneli during the Nazım Hikmet Commemoration Events held in Moscow. The award was given to Akbayram in recognition of his consistent artistic and social stance throughout his musical career.

The Republic Day concert planned to be held in Zonguldak on 29 October 2022 was cancelled by the Zonguldak Governorship due to the mining accident in the Amasra district of Bartın, where 41 miners lost their lives. Following the cancellation, Akbayram made a statement on social media, expressing that he always stood by laborers and workers. He also said, "I wish I could celebrate the Republic enthusiasm together with our working brothers and be their voice." He emphasized that the mining disaster was not only a tragedy for Bartın but a shared grief for the whole of Turkey.

== Swiss days ==
Less than a century remained until the end of the twentieth century. However, there were still many diseases for which no cure had been found. One of these diseases was polio. In Turkey of that period, there was no cure or vaccine for this illness, which emerged in many young children every year and caused great difficulties in their lives. In addition, since it appeared silently, detecting the disease was also difficult. Unaware of anything, children would thus have their hands or feet fail to develop and would be forced to suffer the pain of this for the rest of their lives.

Wearing a knee-length colorful robe and having a thin physique, Edip Akbayram attracted considerable attention at the time with both his stage costume and his musical style. With his Western-style music, which felt foreign to Turkey of that era, he particularly drew the interest of young people. At nine months old, he became a victim of this disease. When he contracted polio at such a young age, his family initially did not understand what it was. They thought it was a seizure or believed it to be the beginning of some other temporary illness. However, when they went to the doctor, they learned it was already too late.

The doctor told them that it was impossible for young Akbayram to return to a normal life, which greatly saddened his family. After hearing this news, the family, wanting to try every possible remedy, visited different doctors, but again found no solution. After going from doctor to doctor, they also sought a cure through prayers, but this too brought no result. Only through the efforts of the doctors were they able to prevent the shortening of his right leg from worsening, but they could not fully stop it. For this reason, Akbayram had to live his whole life with a right leg shorter than his left.

When he first learned about his condition, Edip Akbayram was very upset. As a child, he would cry through the night because, although his friends and his five younger siblings were completely healthy, he had difficulty walking. However, once he began his career and focused on music, Akbayram felt that he had compensated for the shortcomings of his leg. Moreover, since he believed that his leg had helped shape his life's direction, he no longer felt as sad about his disability as before. Nevertheless, the only condition for Akbayram to be able to heal his leg was to save 75,000 liras. In this way, he could go abroad and have surgery. According to a doctor he visited in Gaziantep, while abroad, with electric therapy, hot-cold baths, and massages, he could heal his paralyzed leg.

Starting to save money from the income he earned at concerts, Akbayram also began to receive support from his fellow artists. On his first tour, none of the artists took their own earnings, and all the income was gifted to Akbayram. Despite having searched for many treatment methods without finding a cure, Akbayram received hopeful news from Swiss doctors during a period when he was performing with Dostlar. The Swiss doctors told him that with an operation, they could restore his paralyzed leg to normal, but they would need to determine whether his health condition was suitable for surgery. Delighted by this news, Edip Akbayram eagerly awaited the day he would have the operation and return to his homeland.

Having been deemed suitable for surgery by the doctors, Edip Akbayram went to Switzerland in 1976. Having dreamed of recovery since childhood, he underwent surgery in the summer of that same year. The operations were successful, and afterwards, he remained in the hospital for two months before being discharged. While the surgery significantly reduced the exhausting effects of the diseased leg, it could not prevent it from remaining short for life. Although Akbayram's walking disability, which had left him almost unable to walk in his early years, was not eliminated, his condition became much healthier than before.

== Personal life ==
Edip Akbayram was born in Gaziantep as a member of a family with six children. His father, Nedim Akbayram, was an auto mechanic, and his mother, Türkan Akbayram, was a homemaker. His mother died at the age of 81 due to natural causes related to aging. His sister, Gül Akbayram, worked in the healthcare sector and died after undergoing approximately five months of cancer treatment.

In 1974, he met Mrs. Ayten, who frequently visited the record store where he worked. After five years of friendship, he married ceramic artist Ayten Akbayram on 15 January 1979. The couple shared similar political views and a common worldview. They had two children from this marriage: Ozan, born in 1980, and Türkü, born on 21 November 1985. Ozan Akbayram; he received a conservatory education, learned to play bass guitar and witnessed the pressures of the 1980 coup with his father in his childhood. Their daughter, Türkü Akbayram, graduated from the Piano Department of Istanbul University State Conservatory and pursued a career in music, following in her father's footsteps.

In addition to supporting himself through his artistic work, Edip Akbayram also engaged in business ventures. Alongside the income from cassette sales and concerts, he co–owned a construction company. This company operated in areas such as landscaping, truck transportation, and small–scale building construction.

== Death and legacy ==
On 9 January 2025, Edip Akbayram suffered internal bleeding after a fall at his home and was taken to the hospital. He was admitted to intensive care at the University of Health Sciences Haydarpaşa Numune Training and Research Hospital, where he underwent a surgery that lasted approximately one hour. After the operation, he was returned to intensive care. He later underwent a second surgery, and his treatment at the hospital continued for some time. Following pneumonia treatment, he experienced internal bleeding and remained in intensive care for 53 days.

When his condition failed to respond to medical interventions, Edip Akbayram died from multiple organ failure on 2 March 2025, at Haydarpaşa Numune Hospital. A memorial ceremony was held for him on 4 March 2025, at the Cemal Reşit Rey Concert Hall. The event was attended by many artists and public figures, including Onur Akın, Nejat Yavaşoğulları, Kubat, Ali Sunal, Selami Şahin, Engin Evin, Ferhat Göçer, Muharrem İnce, Özgür Özel, and Kemal Kılıçdaroğlu. Following the ceremony, a funeral prayer was held at Teşvikiye Mosque, and he was laid to rest at Karacaahmet Cemetery.

After his passing, in 2025, the Buca Municipality named a new education center for youth in İzmir's Göksu neighborhood the "Edip Akbayram Study Center." The center, designed to support the education of approximately a thousand students per day, also features a commemorative statue titled "Her şey çok güzel olacak." (Everything will be beautiful.) placed in front of the building to honor the artist's memory. The statue was unveiled during the first annual Book Days event in 2025. It was designed by sculptors Mehmet Latif Sağlam, Uygur Orhan, and Özlem Erhan to reflect the theme of hope that was a recurring message throughout Akbayram's artistic life.

The statue includes the phrase "Güzel Günler Göreceğiz" (We will see beautiful days), symbolizing Edip Akbayram's vision of hope both in his music and public stance. In his remarks during the center's opening, Buca Mayor Mimar Görkem Duman emphasized that Akbayram was not only a musician but also an artist with deep social awareness. He stated that Akbayram had always been a voice for the oppressed and that his name would live on in the city through this center and the monument.

== Ideology ==
During the 1980 military coup in Turkey, Edip Akbayram's life was under threat, and he was subjected to various forms of torture. He often described that period as the most painful time of his life, and referred to Kenan Evren, the leader of the coup, as the person he disliked the most. He defined his philosophy of life through a socialist lens and stated that he always expressed his thoughts openly and without hesitation. In his view, an artist must be free and unafraid to defend the truths they believe in. He often said that he tried to be the melodic voice of oppressed people, regardless of their ethnic background.

In 2019, during the local elections for the Istanbul Metropolitan Municipality, then–President Recep Tayyip Erdoğan criticized artists who supported opposition candidate Ekrem İmamoğlu, calling them "trash." This drew a strong reaction from Akbayram. Reflecting on his long career, he remarked that he had witnessed many presidents and prime ministers come and go, but that these artists had remained steadfast and pursued the truth–something he considered a badge of honor.

Known for his opposition stance, Edip Akbayram received numerous offers throughout his career to run as a parliamentary candidate for various political parties. These included invitations from major political figures such as Bülent Ecevit and Deniz Baykal. However, he declined them all. Explaining his decision to stay out of politics, he once said: "Since the time of Bülent Ecevit, I've received many offers to become a member of parliament–even from Deniz Baykal. But I always said, 'In this country, no one does their own job. Let us sing our songs, and let the politicians do politics.' And I've been singing my songs ever since." He emphasized that he preferred to fulfill his social responsibilities through his music, always placing his identity as an artist above all else.

From the very beginning of his musical career, Edip Akbayram made it clear that he aimed for a lasting and socially impactful understanding of art:

I wanted to do something permanent. I took Fikret Kızılok and Cem Karaca's pop–style singing of Anatolian melodies as an example. I developed myself completely as Edip Akbayram in terms of color and line. I wanted to make social music. My music had to be about the lives and problems of the masses. However, I also tried to stay away from sharp, cheap heroism. Without compromising my beliefs, thoughts, and politics, I wanted to reach the problematic, poor, masses by utilizing musical technique and do something more contemporary.

— Edip Akbayram

When asked about his religious views, Edip Akbayram stated that he was not Alevi and that his official records listed him as Sunni. However, he often shared that when he began his musical journey in high school, he encountered the phrase "Control your hands, your waist, and your tongue" a guiding principle in Alevi–Bektashi culture and adopted this philosophy as his own. He embraced the belief that "My Kaaba is humanity." emphasizing that since he sang for everyone, he had to respect all faiths. According to him, when this human-centered worldview became widespread, marginalization and conflict would disappear.

== Discography ==
=== Studio albums ===
- Edip Akbayram (1974)
- Nedir Ne Değildir? (1977)
- Nice Yıllara Gülüm (1982)
- 1984 (1984)
- 1985 (1985)
- Yeni Gelen Güne Türkü (1986)
- Özgürlük (1988)
- Şahdamar (1990)
- Senden Haber Yok (1991)
- Unutamadıklarım (1992)
- Bir Şarkın Olsun Dudaklarında (1993)
- Türküler Yanmaz (1994)
- Güzel Günler Göreceğiz (1996)
- Yıllar (1997)
- Dün ve Bugün (1998)
- İlk Günkü Gibi (1999)
- Selam Olsun (2001)
- 33'üncü (2002)
- Dün ve Bugün 2 (2004)
- Söyleyemediklerim (2008)
- Mayıs (2012)

=== Single's ===
- Kendim Ettim Kendim Buldum (1970)
- İşte Hendek İşte Deve (1971)
- Kükredi Çimenler (1972)
- Anam Ağlar Baş Ucumda Oturur (1972)
- Deniz Üstü Köpürür (1973)
- Değmen Benim Gamlı Yaslı Gönlüme (1973)
- İnce İnce Bir Kar Yağar (1974)
- Garip (1974)
- Kolum Nerden Aldın Zinciri (1975)
- Mehmet Emmi (1976)
- Zalim (1976)
- Aldırma Gönül Aldırma (1977)
- Kıymayın Efendiler (1978)
- Gidenlerin Türküsü (1979)
- Bugün Bizde Bayram Var (1981)

== Awards ==
The artist received over 250 awards from various organizations throughout his career. Some of these notable awards include:

- 1972: Golden Microphone — Won first place with the single Kükredi Çimenler.
- 1973: Most Promising Male Singer — Awarded based on polls conducted by Hey magazine. He presented this second award, which he won in his music career, to his mother.
- 1977: Hey Oscars Award — Received for the single Aldırma Gönül Aldırma.
- 1979: Gold Record — Awarded for sales exceeding 500,000 copies of the single Gidenlerin Türküsü.
- 2019: Nazım Hikmet Friendship Awards — Received for his contributions to cultural activities held in Moscow.
- 2024: Lifetime Achievement Award — Awarded at the 15th Quality Awards organized by Quality of Magazine; due to his illness, the award was accepted by his daughter, Türkü Akbayram.
