= Sayan Plak =

Turkish record label

- Industry: Music
- Genre: Anatolian rock Psychedelic rock Turkish pop music
- Founded: 1966
- Founder: Fahrettin Sayan
- Headquarters: Fatih, Istanbul, Turkey
- Products: Record, cassette

Sayan Plak, a Turkish record label established in the Unkapanı neighborhood of the Fatih district in Istanbul. It was most active from 1966 to 1974 and primarily released 45 RPM singles, along with a smaller number of EPs and LPs.

== Some artists ==
- Edip Akbayram (1972-74)
- Alpay (1967-68)
- Cem Karaca (1967)
- Fikret Kızılok (1970)
- Erkin Koray (1966)
- Barış Manço (1967-72)
- Mavi Işıklar (1966-69)
- Moğollar (1968-71)
