= Silüetler =

Turkish band

- Origin: Turkey
- Genres: Rock, Anatolian rock
- Past members: (as of 1967); Mesut Aytunca; Erol Bilem; Rasim Ulusman; Aydın Daruga; Murat Ses; Aziz Azmet; Neco

Silüetler ("Silhouettes") was a Turkish rock band.

== Early years ==
The group was founded in Istanbul by Mesut Aytunca (1944–1977), a graduate from the school of journalism. In 1958 he began his music career. He was a bass guitarist, but when he founded Silüetler with Erol Bilem he began playing solo guitar. In the early days of Silüetler, the group inspired from The Shadows, although their music was based on traditional Turkish music arranged for guitar band. According to one view: ”Silüetler took Turkish music out from an identity crisis.”

== Successful years ==
In Boğaziçi Music Festival the band played Üsküdar an arranged form of a very well known Turkish song and they took the third place. In 1965 Golden Microphone contest they played Kaşık Havası, a well known Turkish melody played during folkloric dances along with their entry Sis and they again took the third place. Next year, they were more successful in the same contest. They played Lorke and took the first place. In 1967 their first LP record was released in which they added some American hits to their repertoire.

== Later years ==
In 1967 some members of the band cut loose from the band to form Moğollar. In 1970, Mesut Aytunca took his leave for compulsory civil service. Although he returned to music career in 1972, the next year the band dissolved itself.
