= Islak Islak =

Studio album by Barış Akarsu
- Released: 14 January 2005
- Genre: Rock
- Length: 39:53
- Label: Seyhan Müzik

Barış Akarsu chronology
Islak Islak (2005)	Düşmeden Bulutlarda Koşmam Gerek (2006)

Islak Islak is the first album by Turkish rock musician Barış Akarsu. It was released in 2005 by Seyhan Müzik after Akarsu's success at Akademi Türkiye (Academy Turkey). The album became famous thanks to its first single "Islak Islak" which is a well known piece from Cem Karaca, Turkish musician and childhood idol of Akarsu. Akarsu also pays tribute to his hometown with the song "Amasra".

== Track listing ==
1. Islak Islak
2. Mavi
3. Kimdir O
4. Gel Gör Beni Aşk Neyledi
5. İsterdim
6. Ayrılacağız
7. Amasra
8. Gün Olur
9. Aldırma
10. Bir Kasaba Akşamı
