= List of anonymous Turkish folk songs =

List of Turkish Folk Music anonymous songs, songwriter uncertain (anonymous music), in accordance with the Turkish folk music (Turkish: Türk Halk Müziği) songs list.

== Songs ==
| Folk song name | Region | Song source | Notes |
|---|---|---|---|
| Akkuşun Gürgenleri | Ordu | | |
| Aşağıdan Gelen Yaylı Makine | Tokat | Başaran Yıldız | |
| Atabarı | Artvin | Muzaffer Sarısözen | |
| Başındaki Yazmayı Sarıya mı Boyadın | Tokat | Mihrican Bahar | |
| Bir Güzelin Hasretinden | Tokat | Sadık Doğanay | |
| Burçak Tarlası | Tokat | | |
| Bugün Ben Bir Güzel Gördüm | Tokat | İbrahim Karataş | |
| Çarşıya Vardım | Kayseri | Suzan Yakar Rutkay | A form of Kasik Havasi, the meter is 4/4. Similar tunes are known as Tekirdağın Üzümü. |
| Dandini Dandini Dastana | Unknown | | UKTKlullabies |
| Değmen Benim Gamlı Yaslı Gönlüme | Tokat | Abbas Öz | |
| Değirmen Başında Vurdular Beni | Erzurum | | |
| Deniz Üstü Köpürür | Ula | Cem Karaca | Turkish fishermen song. The meter is 2/4. |
| Develer Kater Kater | Tokat | Yavru Mehmet Efendi | |
| El Çek Tabip El Çek Sinem Üstünden | Tokat | Abbas Öz | |
| El Vurup Yaremi İncitme Tabip | Tokat | Sadık Doğanay | |
| Erchomai ki esy koimasai | Tokat | Domna Samiou | A Turkish and Anatolian Greeks folkloric tune. |
| Geçti Ömrüm Yine Sensiz Neyleyim | Tokat | Kemal Bilsel Sarısözen | |
| Hastane Önünde İncir Ağacı | Yozgat | | |
| Hey Onbeşli | Tokat | | It is written for child soldiers in the Battle of Çanakkale. |
| İşte Gidiyorum Çeşmi Siyahım | Kahramanmaraş | | |
| Kalenin bayır düzü | Central Anatolia | Zehra Bilir | A form of the Kasik Havasi, the meter is 4/4. |
| Leb alev lebler alev | | Hamiyet Yüceses | A form of Çiftetelli. Similar to Kaşlar Kara Gözler Kara (Mevlana) and İç bade güzel sev. The meter is 2/4. |
| Müdür Beyin Yeşil Kürkü | Tokat | TRT | |
| Nasip Olur Amasya'ya Varırsan | Tokat | Ahmet Yıldız | |
| Niksar'ın Fidanaları | Tokat | Hüseyin Arsal | |
| Öğretmene Varamadım | Tokat | Davut Şahin | |
| Sabahın Seherinde Ötüyor Kuşlar | Tokat | Mehmet Erenler | |
| Sarısın Seçemiyom | Tokat | Yöre Ekibi | |
| Sari Gelin | Erzurum | | |
| Seker Oglan | Ankara | | Originated in early 20th century. |
