= Tears of Cem Karaca =

- Directed by: Yüksel Aksu
- Written by: Onur Böber; Özden Uçar; Emrah Saltık; Boran Ağgedik
- Produced by: Fikri Harika Productions; Aytaç Media
- Starring: İsmail Hacıoğlu; Fikret Kuşkan; Yasemin Yalçın; Melisa Aslı Pamuk; Buse Buçe Kahraman; Meral Çetinkaya; Melisa Döngel; Alper Saldıran; Kubilay Tunçer
- Cinematography: Ersan Çapan
- Edited by: Ercan Cebeci
- Music by: Cem Öğet
- Distributed by: TME Films
- Release date: 26 January 2024
- Running time: 123 minutes
- Country: Turkey
- Language: Turkish

Tears of Cem Karaca (Turkish: Cem Karaca'nın Gözyaşları) is a 2024 Turkish biographical drama film based on the life of the legendary Turkish rock musician Cem Karaca. Directed by Yüksel Aksu, the film stars İsmail Hacıoğlu as Cem Karaca.

== Plot ==
The film begins with Cem Karaca's burgeoning interest in music during his high school years. It portrays his journey from forming his first band to gaining stage experience, highlighting the milestones in his career, his innovative contributions to Turkish rock music, his political stance, and his years in exile. The movie also delves into his personal struggles, relationships with his family, and his eventual return to Turkey, offering a comprehensive view of his life.

== Cast ==
- İsmail Hacıoğlu as Cem Karaca
- Fikret Kuşkan as Mehmet Karaca (Cem Karaca's father)
- Yasemin Yalçın as Toto Karaca (Cem Karaca's mother)
- Melisa Aslı Pamuk
- Buse Buçe Kahraman
- Meral Çetinkaya
- Melisa Döngel
- Alper Saldıran
- Kubilay Tunçer

== Production ==
The film was produced by Fikri Harika and Aytaç Media. The screenplay was written by Onur Böber, Özden Uçar, Emrah Saltık, and Boran Ağgedik. Ersan Çapan served as the cinematographer, while Ercan Cebeci edited the film. The music was composed by Cem Öğet.

== Release ==
Tears of Cem Karaca premiered on January 26, 2024, distributed by TME Films.

== Legal issues ==
Cem Karaca's wife, İlkim Karaca, filed a lawsuit claiming that the filmmakers used his works without her permission. The court ruled that the film's screening would be suspended if İlkim Karaca deposited a 3.5 million TL guarantee. Following the deposit, the film was removed from theaters on February 13, 2024. However, the Istanbul Regional Court partially overturned the lower court's decision, allowing the film to be re-released. It returned to theaters on August 8, 2024.
