= Bedia Akartürk =

Turkish singer (born 1941)

- Born: 4 February 1941 (age 84); Ödemiş, İzmir Province, Turkey
- Origin: Turkey
- Genres: Turkish folk music
- Occupation: Singer
- Years active: 1950s–present

Bedia Akartürk (born 4 February 1941) is a Turkish folk music singer.

== Biography ==
Bedia Akartürk was born 4 February 1941 in Ödemiş, İzmir Province. She is the only child of her family. Since she was the only child of the family, she continued her father's surname as Akartürk and never changed her name.

Bedia Akartürk started her art life in Ödemiş, where she was raised, and then she started to work at İzmir Radio when she was older, and after 9 years of experience at İzmir Radio, she moved to Ankara Radio.

She continued her music career Ankara Radio and retired from Ankara Radio, and gave a magnificent concert in Paris Olympia, which was not everyone's fortune at that time, and she represented Turkey in the best way.

She produced 6 cinema films and many albums in her art life, has become the acclaimed singer all around Turkey and has been awarded the title of Honorary Citizen in 7 provinces.

Throughout her artistic life, Bedia Akartürk has been and still is actively continuing her album releases and concerts in Turkey and abroad.

== Bedia Akartürk Museum ==
All the awards that Bedia Akartürk has received so far, the stage clothes she has worn, pictures and local clothes specially prepared by her own hand on dolls can be visited in Bedia Akartürk Museum in Ödemiş.

== Discography ==
- 45'lik
- Anadolu Türküleri
- Anam Ağlar
- Aşka Yemin
- Bayramdan Bayrama
- Bedia Akartürk
- Denize Dalayım Mı
- Derdimi Dermana Gezdim
- Folklör Kraliçesi (1975)
- Gitme Bülbül
- Gülende
- Kervan (Ey Sevdiğim)
- Konyalım yürü
- Konya Bülbülü 1
- Konya Bülbülü 2
- Kullar Olam
- Neyleyim Neyleyim
- Özür Diliyorum Senden (2004)
- Ödemiş Türküleri
- Sıla Hasreti
- Yumurtanın Kulpu Yok
- Zühtü (1978)
