= Banu Kırbağ =

Turkish pop musician (1951–2025)

- Born: 2 March 1951; Istanbul, Turkey
- Died: 18 August 2025 (aged 74) Istanbul, Turkey
- Genres: Pop; pop folk; protest song
- Years active: 1969–2025
- Labels: Disko; Polydor; Yonca; Hop; Ballet; Bayar Music; Fono; Sarp; Goksoy; Bayar Müzik; Major; Ossi
- Formerly of: Bayar Music; Ada Müzik; Balet Plak; Sarp Plak
- Spouse: Onur Yurdatapan
- Website: banukirbag.com

Banu Kırbağ (2 March 1951 – 18 August 2025) was a Turkish pop singer, composer, and arranger. Active from the 1970s, she was a pioneering female figure in Turkish pop music and is recognized as the country's first female music arranger.

== Life and career ==
Banu Kırbağ was born in Istanbul in 1951. She began her musical path in 1969 as an amateur vocalist in her high school orchestra. She later studied singing and solfeggio at the Istanbul University State Conservatory before embarking on a professional stage career.

In 1972, she joined her sister Hülya Kırbağ and musician Zafer Dilek to form the trio Zafer-Banu-Hülya. The group released four 45 rpm singles and one studio album before disbanding in 1976, after which Kırbağ launched her solo career.

=== Solo career ===
On 5 March 1977, she briefly adopted the stage name Banu Arman before reverting to performing simply as Banu. She achieved widespread prominence in 1978 with the hit singles Ölsem de Bir, Kalsam da Bir, and Unutulur. That same year, she began a five-year period of study under composer Timur Selçuk at the Çağdaş Dershane (Modern Preparatory School), training in voice, solfeggio, harmony, counterpoint, and arrangement.

At the invitation of Culture Minister Ahmet Taner Kışlalı, Kırbağ performed in Moscow, Baku, and Ashgabat as part of Soviet-Turkish cultural exchange initiatives. She also ventured into theater, starring alongside Alpay İzer in a musical written specifically for her by Umur Bugay.

For her 1984 album Anlatayım (I Am Telling), Kırbağ composed music set to poems by Faruk Nafiz Çamlıbel, Ahmet Kutsi Tecer, and Ümit Yaşar Oğuzcan over the course of two years.

At the 1987 Kuşadası Golden Pigeon Music Competition, singer Ayşegül Aldinç performed Bir Bahar Aşkısın (You Are a Spring Love), a song composed and arranged by Kırbağ with lyrics by Aysel Gürel. Kırbağ conducted the 30-piece orchestra during the live performance before an audience of 20,000, making her the first female orchestra conductor in the history of Turkish pop music. The performance earned her the Güneş Newspaper Special Award. In 1991, her composition Bırak Ellerimi, performed by Zerrin Özer, won first place from the TRT for best composition of the year.

Throughout her career, Kırbağ released 15 albums and expanded her repertoire with songs like Az Bana, Kırık Hava, Sevgi Kuşun Kanadında, and pieces by Zülfü Livaneli. She collaborated with notable artists including Şanar Yurdatapan, Hakkı Yücel, Yusuf Ziya Ulusoy, Hasan Hüseyin Demirel, and Alp Murat Alper. In 1988, she provided vocals alongside Edip Akbayram on his album Özgürlük. In 2000, she joined the Ankara Metropolitan City Orchestra as a permanent soloist, and later served on the audit board of the musical copyright society MESAM.

=== Death ===
Kırbağ died from cancer on 18 August 2025 at the age of 74. Her funeral was held the following day, and she was buried at Zincirlikuyu Cemetery in Istanbul.

== Discography ==
=== 45s ===
==== Zafer Banu Hülya ====
- Şimdi Yalnızım (Banu Solo) / Seni Öyle Seviyorum Ki (Yonca-1974)
- Çukulata Sevgilim / Kara Kara Badem Gözler (Yonca-1974)
- Ağlama Gönlüm Ağlama / Seni Gidi Çapkın (Yonca-1975)
- Kalbim İstanbul'da / Kaleden Top Atarlar (Yonca-1976)

==== Solo ====
- Vefasız / Eski Bir Mektup (Disko-1970)
- Sormadan Gir / Zalim (Polydor-1974)
- Nasıl Mutlu Olurum Sensiz / Öyle Bir Dünyada Yaşıyorum Ki (Yonca-1976)
- Ölsem De Bir Kalsam Da Bir / Buna Sevmek Denirse (Hop-1979)
- Eski Sevgili / Yok Ki (Hop-1980)
- Bir Ömür Geçti (2k23-2024)

=== Albums ===
- Zafer, Banu ve Hülya (Yonca-1976)
- Bir Demet Müzik (Balet-1981)
- Anlatamıyorum (Balet-1984)
- Canım Can Çekişmede (Bayar-1986)
- Gün Kavuşurken (Fono-1988)
- Kırık Hava (Bayar-1990)
- Gider Olduk (Sarp-1992)
- Sevdalardayım (Göksoy/Ada-1994)
- Türküler Yolladım Sana (Major-1998)
- En İyileriyle Banu (2 CD, Ossi-5 February 2009)
