= Barış Akarsu =

Turkish singer and actor (1979–2007)

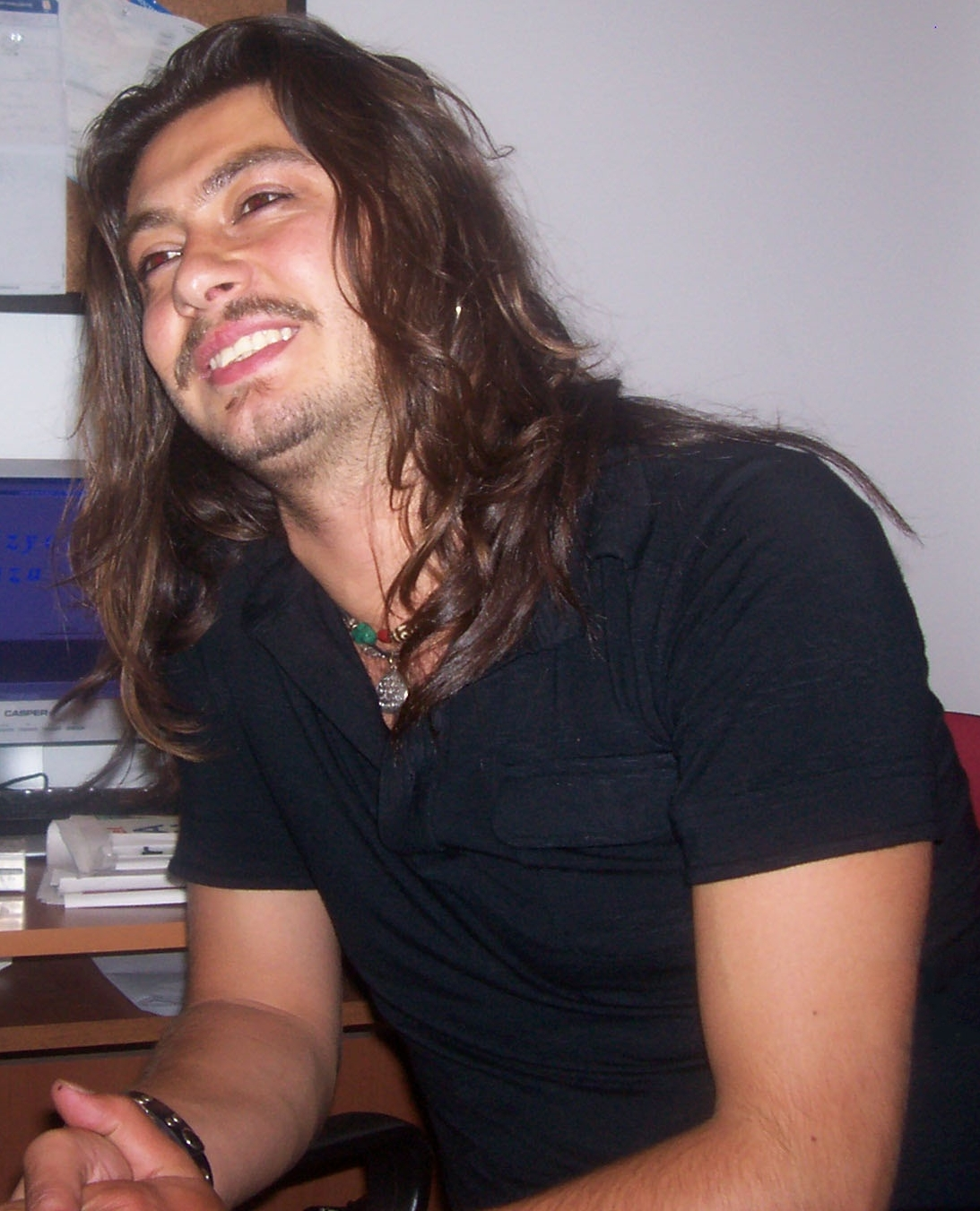
- Barış Akarsu in 2007

Background information
- Also known as: Amasra's Wild Wave (Amasra'nın Hırçın Dalgası)
- Born: June 29, 1979; Amasra, Bartın, Turkey
- Died: July 4, 2007 (aged 28) Bodrum, Turkey
- Genres: Anatolian rock, hardrock, folk rock, poprock
- Occupations: Musician, actor
- Instruments: Vocals, guitar, harmonica
- Years active: 1999–2007
- Labels: Joker Müzik; Seyhan Müzik
- Website: www.baris-akarsu.com

Barış Akarsu (June 29, 1979 – July 4, 2007) was a Turkish Anatolian rock singer and actor who rose to fame after winning the television series Akademi Türkiye (Academy Turkey) in July 2004. He released two studio albums in three years and was also acting in television series Yalancı Yarim (My Lying Lover) which aired on Star TV.

On June 29, 2007, he was seriously injured in a car crash on his way back from a charity concert for children. After spending five days in an intensive care unit, he died of complications from the crash on July 4, 2007, at the age of 28. He donated most of his concert money.

== Early life ==
Akarsu was born and raised in Bartın, in northern Turkey. He was a huge fan of rock music, listening to music from Ruhi Su, Cem Karaca and Barış Manço as well as Western acts like Led Zeppelin or U2.

His friends and Akarsu gathered at the seaside of Amasra to chat and sing songs while playing guitar. There, Akarsu formed his early ties with singing and playing instruments. Music always played a crucial part in his life. His other big ambition was tae kwon do, basketball and sailing (in high-school he was sailing professionally in Amasra Sailing Club).

== Musical career ==
Before rising to fame with his musical and screen projects, Akarsu worked as an entertainer in beach resorts in Antalya. Later he moved to Karadeniz Ereğli, where he started singing regularly at bars with Ilhami Yeni, the local television and radio shows before joining the TV show Academy Turkey. Shortly after winning the show, he moved to Istanbul to pursue a career in music.

Barış Akarsu released his first album Islak Islak, followed by his second Düşmeden Bulutlarda Koşmam Gerek released in August 2006. He appeared on music videos for his songs "Islak Islak", "Kimdir O", "Mavi" and "Amasra" from his first and "Vurdum En Dibe Kadar" and "Yaz Demedim" from his second album. He composed and wrote the lyrics for "Ben" and "Yeter Be" from his second album. At the time of his death, he was working on his unreleased third album. This album "Ayrılık Zamansız Gelir" was released after his death on 2008.

== Acting career ==
Akarsu's first and only appearance as an actor is in the popular Turkish comedy series Yalancı Yarim. In the show, Akarsu portrays a wealthy young man, Tarık Tekelioğlu, who goes to Italy for his education but rather becomes the most successful rally driver.

Also, Akarsu acted in F5 Malt Drink commercial in 2005.

== Death ==
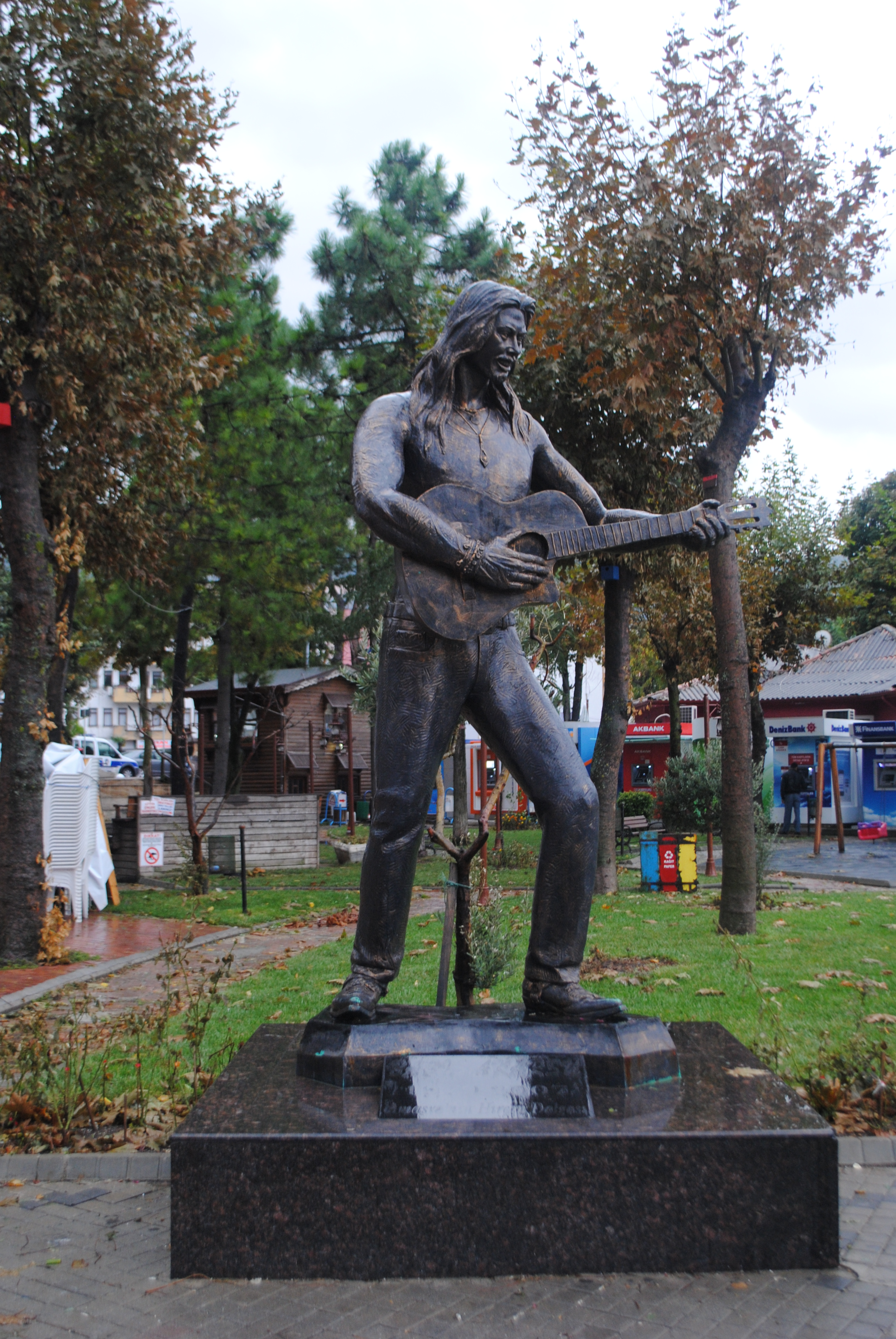
A statue erected in his honor in Amasra

On June 29, 2007, Akarsu and two friends were on their way to a celebration party for his birthday in Bodrum. Their car collided with a truck at an intersection with no traffic lights. The driver of the car, his girlfriend Zeynep Koçak, and passenger Nalan Kahraman died on the same day of the accident. Barış Akarsu was transported to a hospital with severe injuries. On July 4, 2007, Akarsu died due to complications arising from the accident.

Famous sculptor Tankut Otkem and his students have erected a statue for his honor on Amasra on 4th of July in his first death anniversary.

The location of the accident is a crossroads at the end of a long and straight downhill grade. As a result of protests decrying the lack of traffic lights at that dangerous intersection, new lights have been installed. And also the intersection's name changed to "Barış Intersection" after his death.

== Discography ==
Album	Date of release
Islak Islak	2005
Düşmeden Bulutlarda Koşmam Gerek	2006
Ayrılık Zamansız Gelir (Posthumous)	2008
