= Düşmeden Bulutlarda Koşmam Gerek =

Studio album by Barış Akarsu
- Released: 17 August 2006
- Genre: Rock
- Length: 45:19
- Label: Seyhan Müzik

Barış Akarsu chronology
Islak Islak (2005)	Düşmeden Bulutlarda Koşmam Gerek (2006)	Ayrılık Zamansız Gelir (2008)

Düşmeden Bulutlarda Koşmam Gerek is the second album by Turkish rock musician Barış Akarsu. The album was released in 2006 both because of the success of Akarsu's first album and the popularity of his TV series, Yalancı Yarim (My Lying Lover). The only single which is released from the album is "Vurdum En Dibe Kadar". Late copies of the album also contain the song "Gözlerin" (Your Eyes), the popular song of Akarsu's TV series.

== Track listing ==
- Vurdum En Dibe Kadar
- Vazgeçme
- Yaz Demedim
- Adını Çıkar Deliye
- Ben
- Rapatma (Vira Vira)
- Yazdan Kalma
- Yalan Dünya
- Zümrüt-ü Anka
- Yeter Be
- Kayboldum
- Ben (Acoustic version)
- Gözlerin (Bonus Track)
