= Selda Bağcan =

Turkish singer-songwriter and guitarist

- Born: Havva Selda Bağcan; December 14, 1948 (age 77); Muğla, Turkey
- Genres: Turkish folk music; folk rock; psychedelic folk; protest music
- Occupations: Singer-songwriter; musician; record producer
- Instruments: Vocals; guitar; bağlama; mandolin
- Years active: 1971–present
- Label: Majör Müzik Yapım

Havva Selda Bağcan (IPA: [ˈsælda ˈbaːdʒan]; born December 14, 1948) is a Turkish folk singer-songwriter, guitarist, and music producer.

== Early life ==
Selda Bağcan was born in 1948 in the western Turkish town of Muğla. Her father Selim Bağcan was a veterinarian of Macedonian Turk origin from the town of Bitola, and her mother Fevziye was a teacher of Crimean Tatar origin. She had two older brothers named Savaş and Sezer, and a younger brother named Serter, born when Selda was two years old. The family relocated to Van shortly after Serter was born, where Selda spent most of her childhood. Her father, Selim, was a music enthusiast who played the saxophone and the flute, and he encouraged all his children to start playing instruments from a very young age. Selda herself started to play the mandolin when she was five. The family spent many evenings playing music together, under the direction of Selim.

Upon her father Selim's unexpected death from typhoid fever in 1957, the rest of the family moved to Ankara to be close to the mother's sister. Selda continued to play the mandolin, and picked up the guitar as well, during her middle school and high school years. At first she sang English, Italian and Spanish songs she picked up on the radio, but during her years as a student at Ankara University's engineering physics department, she started to develop an interest in traditional Turkish folk music, inspired by early Anatolian rock singers like Cem Karaca, Barış Manço and Fikret Kızılok, as well as the folk singer Saniye Can. Her brothers owned a popular music club named Beethoven in central Ankara, where she met some of these singers in person and where she was a regular performer herself throughout her years as a university student.

== Career ==
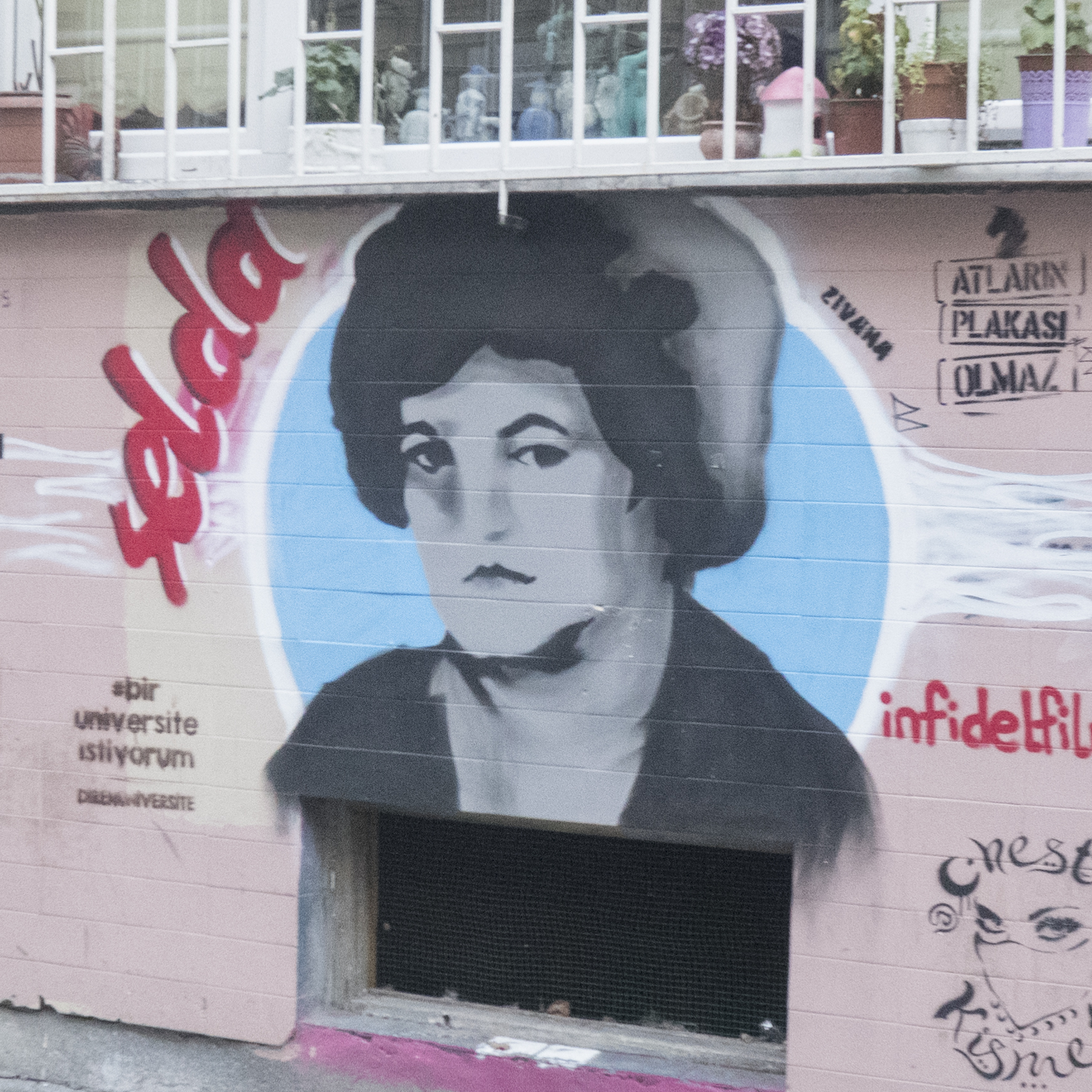
Selda Bagcan's graffiti in Istanbul.

Her career as a professional musician started in 1971, during her final year at the university, with the encouragement and support of the Ankara-based music producer Erkan Özerman. The six singles she released that year, in which she interpreted traditional Turkish folk songs in a strong, emotional voice, accompanied by a simple acoustic guitar or bağlama, carried her to national fame. In 1972, she was selected by the Turkish Ministry of Foreign Affairs to represent Turkey in the international Golden Orpheus song contest. She released twelve more singles and three LP records until 1980 and toured many cities in Turkey and western Europe. Many of her songs carried strong social criticism and solidarity with the poor and the working class, which made her especially popular among the left-wing activists and sympathisers during the politically polarized 1970s.

She experimented with rock and roll and with synthetic and electronic sounds in her LPs, although her musical style remained firmly rooted in the folk tradition. After the 1980 Turkish coup d'état, she was persecuted by the military rulers due to her political songs, and was imprisoned three times between 1981 and 1984. Her passport was confiscated and held by the authorities until 1987, which, among other things, prevented her from attending the first WOMAD Reading festival in 1986. Partly thanks to pressure from WOMAD, her passport was returned in 1987 and she immediately started a European tour, giving concerts in the Netherlands and the United Kingdom in the same year.

Since then, she has produced several albums and given concerts in many cities in Turkey and all over the world, and remains active in the Turkish musical scene. Her 1993 single Uğurlar Olsun (Farewell), a lament she composed for the assassinated journalist Uğur Mumcu, was immensely popular and quickly became a symbol for the political turbulence of the 1990s, a period marked by several unsolved high-profile assassinations in Turkey. In late 2000, she was badly injured in a car accident on her way to a concert in Antakya, suffering several broken bones as well as contusions and cuts all over her body. She was able to make full recovery after a lengthy period of treatment. She expressed solidarity with the Gezi Park protests of 2013, even though she was not able to physically participate in the protests due to a concert in Belgium. In November 2014, Selda headlined Le Guess Who? Festival in Utrecht, The Netherlands, together with bands that admitted to be influenced by her music, including St. Vincent, Tune-Yards and Suuns and Jerusalem In My Heart. Florence Welch has listed her as an influence for her music.

Bağcan currently lives in Istanbul and runs the music production company Majör Müzik Yapım. Her music has been sampled by several musicians outside of Turkey, including the band 2manydjs and hip-hop artists Mos Def, Oh No, and Dr. Dre.

== Discography ==
=== Studio albums ===
- Türkülerimiz 1 (1974)
- Türkülerimiz 2 (1975)
- Türkülerimiz 3 (1976)
- Türkülerimiz 4 (1977)
- Türkülerimiz 5 (1978)
- Türkülerimiz 6 (1979)
- Türkülerimiz 7 (1980)
- Türkülerimiz 8 (1982)
- Türkülerimiz 9 (1983)
- Türkülerimiz 10 (1985)
- Dost Merhaba (1986)
- Yürüyorum Dikenlerin Üstünde (1987)
- Özgürlük ve Demokrasiyi Çizmek (1988)
- Felek Beni Adım Adım Kovaladı (1989)
- Anadolu Konserleri: Müzikteki 20 Yılım (1 and 2) (1990)
- Ziller ve İpler - Akdeniz Şarkıları 1 (1992)
- Uğur'lar Olsun (1993)
- Koçero (with Ahmet Kaya) (1994)
- Çifte Çiftetelli - Akdeniz Şarkıları 2 (1997)
- Ben Geldim (2002)
- Deniz'lerin Dalgasıyım (2004)
- Güvercinleri de Vururlar (2009)
- Halkım (2011)
- 40 Yılın 40 Şarkısı (2014)
- Selda Bağcan Remix (2017)
- 40 Yılın 40 Şarkısı, Vol. 2 (2020)

=== Singles ===
- "Katip Arzuhalim Yaz Yare Böyle - Mapusanede Mermerden Direk" (1971)
- "Tatlı Dillim Güler Yüzlüm - Mapusanelere Güneş Doğmuyor" (1971)
- "Çemberimde Gül Oya - Toprak Olunca" (1971)
- "Adaletin Bu Mu Dünya - Dane Dane Benleri" (1971)
- "Seher Vakti - Uzun İnce Bir Yoldayım" (1971)
- "Yalan Dünya - Kalenin Dibinde" (1972)
- "Eyvah Gönül Sana Eyvah - Zalim Sevgililer Bu Sözüm Size" (1972)
- "Bölemedim Felek İle Kozumu - Bülbül" (1973)
- "Gesi Bağları - Altın Kafes" (1973)
- "Nem Kaldı - Rabbim Neydim Ne Oldum" (1974)
- "Aşkın Bir Ateş - O Günler" (1974)
- "Anayasso - Bad-ı Sabah" (1974)
- "Dostum Dostum - Yuh Yuh" (1975)
- "Kaldı Kaldı Dünya - İzin İze Benzemiyor" (1975)
- "Görüş Günü - Şaka Maka" (1976)
- "Almanya Acı Vatan - Kıymayın Efendiler" (1976)
- "Aldırma Gönül Aldırma - Suç Bizim" (1976)
