= Bülent Ortaçgil =

Turkish composer and singer (born 1950)

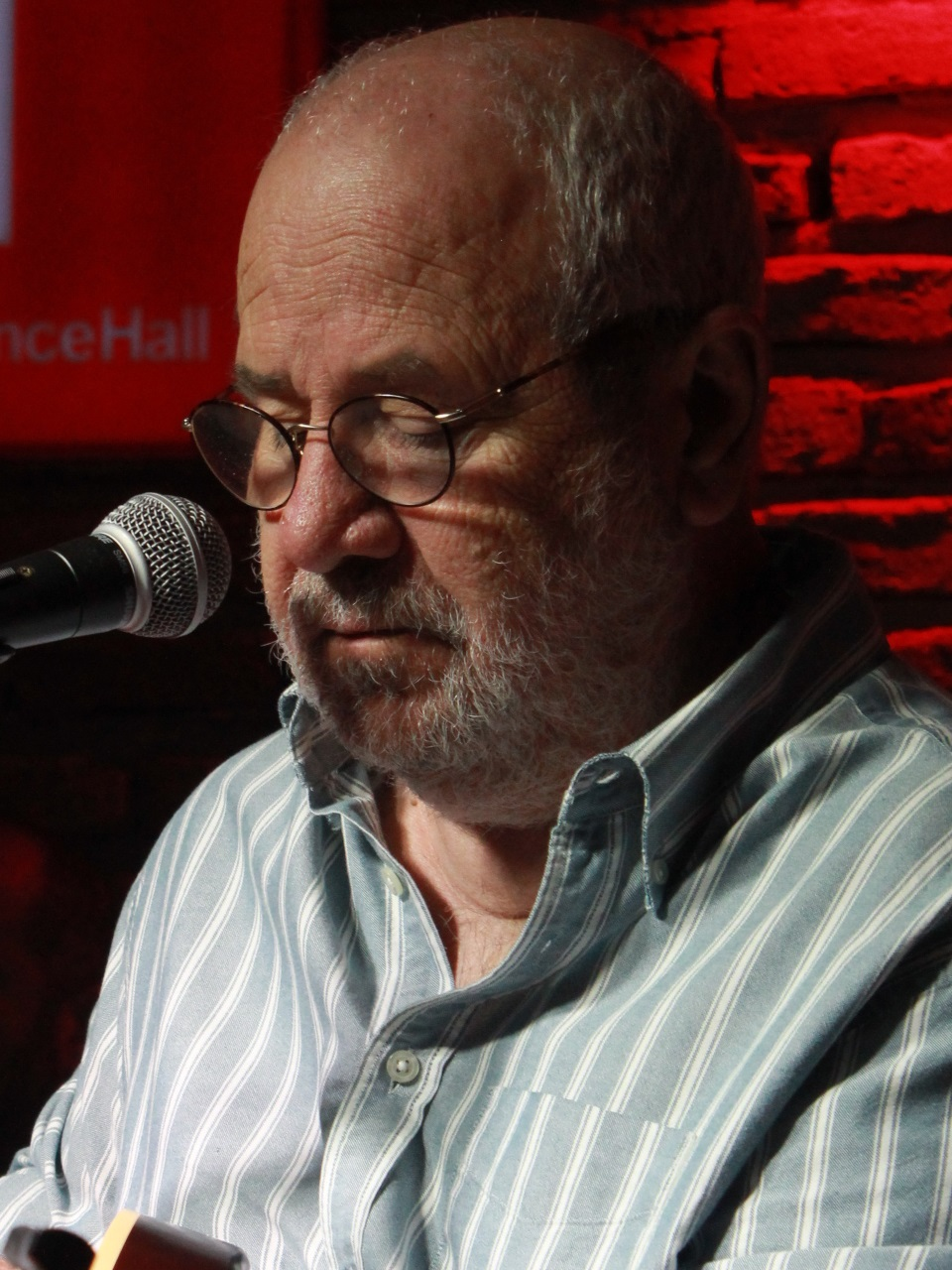

Background information
- Born: İbrahim Bülent Ortaçgil; 1 March 1950 (age 75); Ankara, Turkey
- Genres: Folk rock, jazz, folk music
- Occupations: Musician, singer, composer, arranger, songwriter
- Instruments: Vocals, guitar
- Years active: 1971–present
- Labels: 1 Numara Plakçılık (1974–1976); Kaynak Müzik (1986–1990); Piccatura (1990–1998); Ada Müzik (1998–present)

Bülent Ortaçgil (born 1 March 1950) is a Turkish composer and singer.

== Biography ==
He was born in Ankara, Turkey in 1950. He moved to Istanbul after starting elementary school which he finished at Sultanahmet Elementary School in Istanbul. He completed his middle school and high school education at Kadıköy Anadolu Lisesi which is also commonly known as Kadıköy Maarif College. He graduated from the University of Istanbul, Faculty of Chemistry.

== Musical career ==
He started playing guitar while at Kadıköy Maarif Koleji. Another popular composer and singer Mazhar Alanson (from the band MFÖ) was concurrently a student at the same school, and says that Ortaçgil was a guitar player that he admired back in school. He played with some groups, including Damlalar (Drops). His music has been influenced by various artists, including The Beatles, Cat Stevens, Donovan and Bob Dylan. His first long play was called "Anlamsız" (Meaningless), which he published while in college.

In 1974, his first album was released under the title "Benimle Oynar Mısın?" (Will You Play with Me?), considered to be a classic. Onno Tunç and Ergun Pekcan were among those who helped the recording and mastering of his albums.

He took a ten-year break from music after he got married. During this time, he worked as a chemical engineer at companies like Pfizer and Netaş Telecom. During 1985, Ortaçgil played with Fikret Kızılok at "Çekirdek Müzikevi"; this performance yielded to a non-published copy album "Bizim Şarkılarımız …".

The album "Pencere Önü Çiçeği" (Windowsill Flower) was published in 1986. The song Pencere Önü Çiçeği was another classic, criticizing an intellectual, isolated life against a life "outside the window."

In 1991 came the album called "Oyuna Devam" (Let the game continue). The album gathered some of his old band friends such as Erkan Oğur, Cem Aksel and Gürol Ağırbaş, who had been playing together for over 10 years.

In 2000, a tribute album called "Şarkılar bir Oyundur" (Songs Are a Game) was published, featuring performances from 22 different Turkish singers and bands, spanning a wide genre of music among them.

He frequently uses the theme "game"/"play" in his songs.

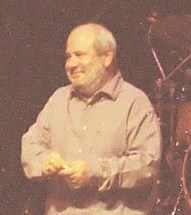
At the end of a concert in Istanbul (November 2008)

== Discography ==
=== Singles ===
- 1971: Anlamsız / Yüzünü Dökme Küçük Kız
- 1974: Olmalı mı, Olmamalı mı? / Şık Latife

=== Studio albums ===
- 1974: Benimle Oynar Mısın?
- 1990: 2. Perde
- 1991: Oyuna Devam
- 1994: Bu Şarkılar Adam Olmaz
- 1998: Light
- 2003: Gece Yalanları
- 2010: Sen
- 2022: Elli Buçuk

=== Other albums ===
- 1976: 3 Masal (Masal album)
- 1984: Rüzgara Söylenen Şarkılar (live album)
- 1985: Biz Şarkılarımızı.. (recorded live with Fikret Kızılok)
- 1986: Pencere Önü Çiçeği (with Fikret Kızılok)
- 1999: Eski Defterler (Contains new versions of his earlier works)
- 2007: Teoman-Bülent Ortaçgil Konser (live with Teoman)
- 2007: Büyükler İçin Çocuk Şarkıları (recorded with Fikret Kızılok in 1987 and released 20 years later)
- 2017: Senfonik Ortaçgil (Concert DVD)
