= Moğollar =

Turkish rock band

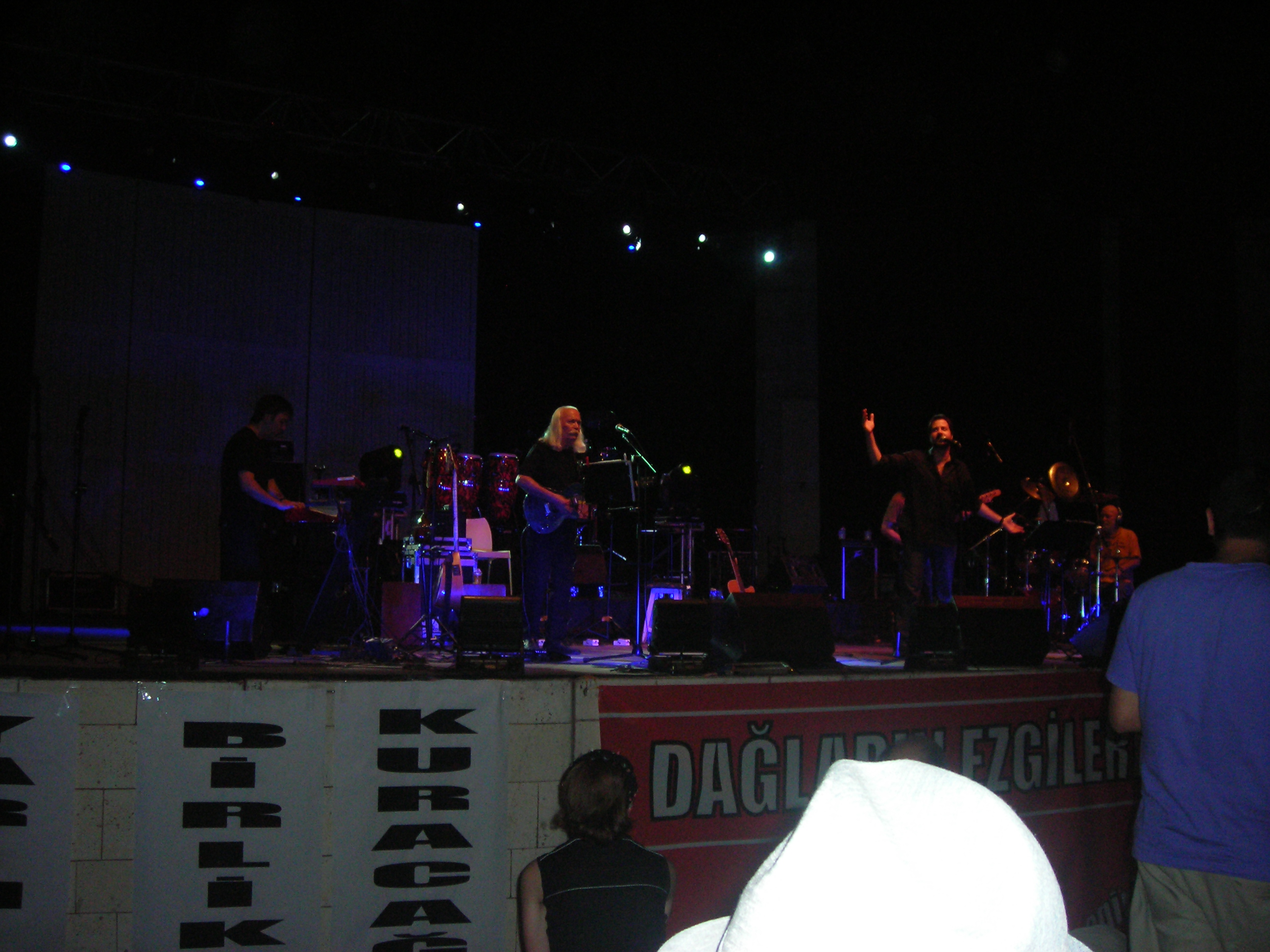

Background information
- Origin: Istanbul, Turkey
- Genres: Anatolian rock, psychedelic rock, folk rock, progressive rock
- Years active: 1967–1976, 1992–present
- Label: Emre Plak
- Members: Emrah Karaca; Cahit Berkay; Taner Öngür; Serhat Ersöz; Kemal Küçükbakkal
- Past members: Utku Ünal; Engin Yörükoğlu (deceased in 2010); Nejat Tahir Özyılmazel; Aziz Azmet; Ersen Dinleten; Barış Manço (deceased in 1999); Selda Bağcan; Cem Karaca (deceased in 2004); Murat Ses; Haluk Kunt; Hasan Sel; Aydın Daruga (deceased in 2015); Ayzer Danga (deceased in 2021)
- Website: www.mogollar.org

Moğollar (Mongols in Turkish) was one of the pioneering bands in Turkish rock music during their early career and one of the founders of Turkish folk rock (or Anatolian rock). They have been active for over 40 years. The band uses multi-layered dynamism in the Turkish folk genre to create a sonic similarity with pop music's dynamism.

== History ==
The band was founded end of 1967 by Aziz Azmet, Murat Ses and Aydin Daruga.

In 1970, Hasan Sel was replaced by Taner Öngür, previously a member of Meteorlar (Meteors) and the Erkin Koray Quartet. The band tried to fuse the technical aspects of pop music with the melodies of Anatolian folk music in the late 1960s and early 1970s.

In July 1970, Aziz Azmet, the band's vocalist left the band due to musical disagreements and Ersen Dinleten replaced him for a short time. Moğollar recorded Ternek/Haliç'te Gün Batışı (Ternek/Sunset on the Golden Horn) on a 45 rpm single, and left for Paris in August 1970. While they went to Paris, they signed a 3-year contract with CBS, releasing a 45 rpm single Hitchin/Behind the Dark in 1972. They made one album for the imprint "Guild International du Disque", Danses et Rythmes de la Turquie -- d'Hier d'Aujourd'hui. This album was recognized by the French Académie Charles Cros in 1971, earning comparisons to Pink Floyd. By that time, they met with Barış Manço and started to work with him while he was living in Belgium.

In 1968 the group won the third place in Turkish music contest Golden Microphone. In 1971 the group won the Grand Prix du Disque of the Charles Cros Academy for their instrumental album Danses et Rythmes de la Turquie.

In 1971, Barış Manço joined as vocalist and the band was renamed Manchomongol. Manchomongol recorded two 45 rpms, and this partnership ended after four months. Also, Engin Yörükoğlu stayed in Paris, and the drummer of Mavi Işıklar (Blue Lights), Ayzer Danga, joined the band to replace him.

Moğollar recorded one single with Selda Bağcan during the first half of 1972. Ersen then re-joined the band in July 1972 and they recorded another single. Murat Ses left the band in August 1972. In September 1972, Moğollar replaced their soloists with Cem Karaca, who was then the soloist of Kardaşlar (Brothers).This partnership of Cem Karaca and Moğollar lasted for two years and they produced the song, Namus Belası, which became a great hit.

In 1974, Taner Öngür and Ayzer Danga left the band. Öngür joined Dadaşlar, a band with Ersen Dinleten between 1974–1975 and 1979–1980 and Dervişan (Dervishes), a band with Cem Karaca between 1974 and 1978. He also briefly joined Dostlar, a band with Edip Akbayram in 1975. Danga initially joined Kardaşlar between 1974 and 1975. He participated in Erkin Koray's 'Elektronik Türküler' (Electronic Songs) album in 1975. He then joined Dostlar between 1975 and 1978; Güneşin Sofrası, a band with Kerem Güney (1939-2012) in 1979; Dadaşlar, a band with Ersen Dinleten in 1983 and Zorbeyler in 1984 before his retirement from music. Meanwhile, Cahit Berkay left for France after the dissolution of the band to meet with Engin Yörükoğlu. Cahit and Engin recorded two albums under the name Moğollar. They also recorded a single with Ali Rıza Binboğa in 1975. The band completely dissolved in 1976.

After a 17-year absence, Cahit Berkay, Taner Öngür and Engin Yörükoğlu reformed the band in 1993, and were joined by keyboard player Serhat Ersöz. Murat Ses is dealing with other projects and is still pursuing an extraordinary international career.

In 2007, the Advertising agency TBWA decided to use Moğollar's track from the late 1960's, Garip Çoban (translated - Lonesome Shepherd; written by Murat Ses) in the This is Living advertisement campaign for Sony's PlayStation 3. Emrah Karaca (son of Cem Karaca) joined Moğollar in 2007 as a vocalist and guitarist. Engin Yörükoğlu was diagnosed with lung cancer in 2007 and died in 2010.

== Members ==
Current members

- Cahit Berkay – bağlama, guitar, kamancheh, mandolin, yaylı tanbur, vocals (1968–1976, 1993–present)
- Taner Öngür – bass, vocals (1969–1974, 1993–present)
- Serhat Ersöz – keyboards (1993–present)
- Emrah Karaca – vocals, guitar (2007–present)
- Kemal Küçükbakkal – drums (2011–present)

Former members

- Aziz Azmet – vocals, guitar (1967–1970; deceased)
- Murat Ses – keyboards (1967–1972)
- Hasan Sel – bass (1968–1969)
- Engin Yörükoğlu – drums (1969–1971, 1974–1976, 1993–2010; deceased)
- Ersen Dinleten – vocals (1970, 1972)
- Ayzer Danga – drums (1971–1974; deceased)
- Barış Manço – vocals (1971–1972; deceased)
- Selda Bağcan – vocals (1972)
- Cem Karaca – vocals (1972–1974; deceased)
- Mithat Danışan – bass (1974, 1975)
- Turhan Yükseler – keyboards (1974, 1975)
- Tufan Altan – drums (1974, 1975)
- Sulubika – flute (1975)
- Michael Shollet – bass (1975)
- Romen Petiter – keyboards (1975)
- Utku Ünal – drums (2010–2011)

== Discography ==
=== Studio albums ===
- 1971 : Les Danses et Rythmes de la Turquie d'hier á aujourd'hui (Turkish release: Anadolu Pop)
- 1975 : Hittit Sun (Turkish release: Düm-Tek)
- 1976 : Ensemble d'Cappadocia (Turkish release: Moğollar)
- Moğollar '94 (1994)
- Dört Renk (1996)
- 30. Yıl (1998)
- Yürüdük Durmadan (2004)
- Umut Yolunu Bulur (2009)
- Anadolu Efsaneleri (2013)
- Unutulmayan Plaklar Arșiv, Vol. 1 (2015)
- 2.2.1973 Ankara (2016)
- Anatolian Sun (2020)

=== Singles ===
- Eastern Love / Artık Çok Geç (1968)
- Mektup / Lazy John (1968)
- Everlasting Love / Hard Work (1968)
- Ilgaz / Kaleden Kaleye Şahin Uçurdum (1968)
- Sessiz Gemi / İndim Havuz Başına (1969)
- Dağ Ve Çocuk / İmece (1970)
- Ağlama / Yalnızlığın Acıklı Güldürüsü (1970)
- Garip Çoban / Berkay Oyun Havası (1970)
- Ternek / Haliç'te Güneşin Batışı (1970)
- Hitchin / Behind The Dark (1970)
- Behind The Dark / Madımak / Lorke (1971)
- Hitchin / Hamsi (1971)
- İşte Hendek İşte Deve/Katip Arzuhalim Yaz Yare Böyle (1971)
- Binboğanın Kızı / Ay Osman (1971)
- Yalan Dünya / Kalenin Dibinde (1972)
- Alageyik Destanı / Moğol Halayı (1972)
- Çığrık / Sıla (1972)
- Sor Kendine / Garip Gönlüm (1972)
- Obur Dünya / El Çek Tabib (1973)
- Gel Gel / Üzüm Kaldı (1973)
- Namus Belası / Gurbet (1974)
- Tanrıların Arabaları / Bu Nasıl Dünya? (1974)
- Birlik için Elele / Sevgimin Derdi Albümler (feat. Ali Rıza Binboğa) (1975)

=== Compilations ===
- Anılarla Moğollar ve Silüetler (1990)
- Anadolupop 70'li Yıllar (1993)
- Moğollar 1968-2000 (2000)
