= Toto Karaca =

Turkish actress (1912–1992)

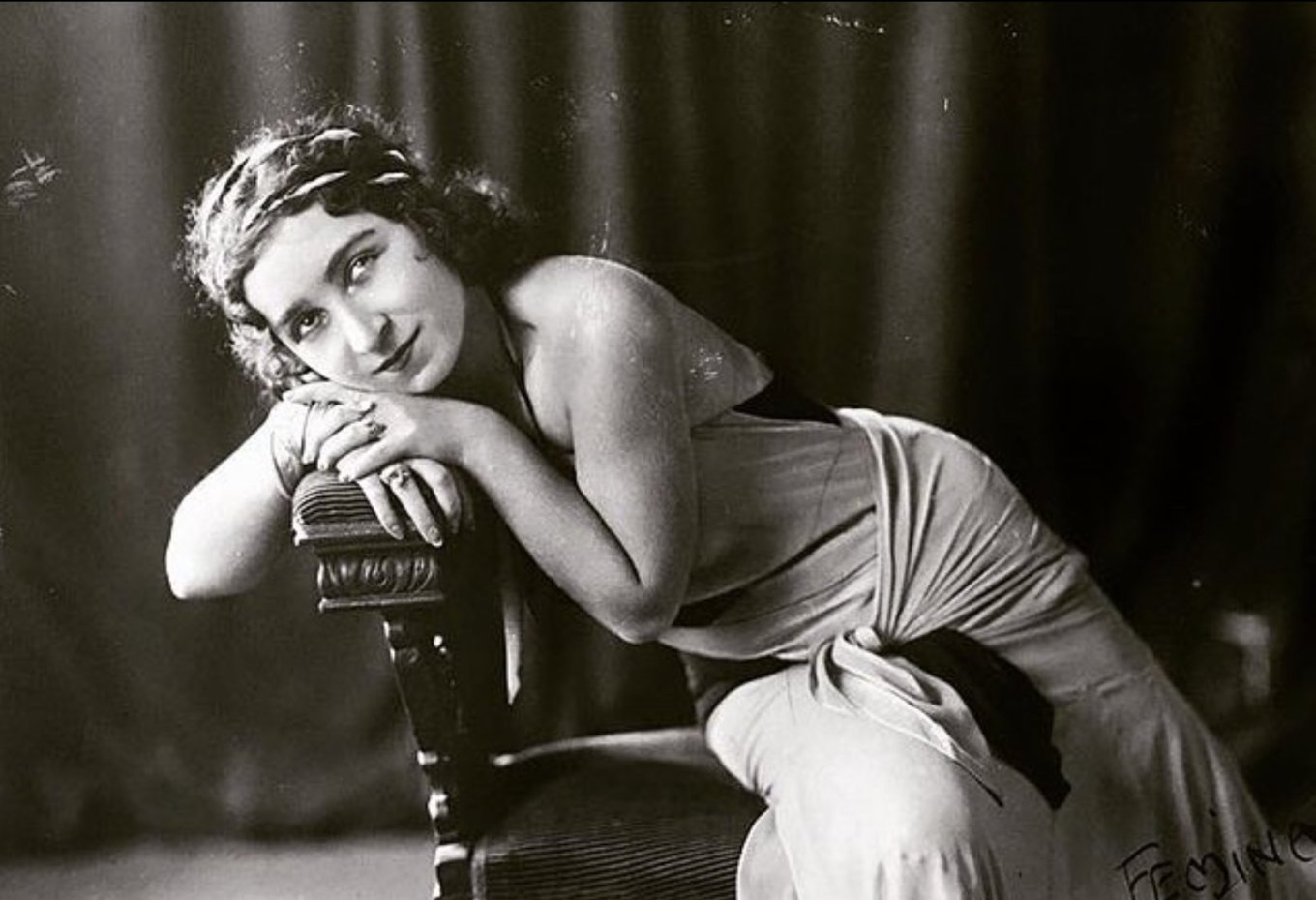
- Born: (Armenian)İrma Felekyan; 18 March 1912; Istanbul, Ottoman Empire
- Died: 22 July 1992 (aged 80); Istanbul, Turkey
- Resting place: Şişli Armenian Cemetery
- Other name: İrma Toto
- Spouse: Mehmet Karaca (m. 1939)
- Children: Cem Karaca

İrma Felekyan, better known as Toto Karaca (18 March 1912 – 22 July 1992), was a Turkish stage actress.

Of Armenian descent, Felekyan was born on March 18, 1912, in the Ottoman Empire. Her mother was Mari Hranuş Felekyan. She learned ballet dancing in her childhood. During her performances in musicals, she preferred the name İrma Toto. Her surname became Karaca when she married theatre actor Mehmet Karaca in 1939, due to the legislation then in force. Their son Cem Karaca became a leading figure in Anatolian rock music.

In the 1930s, she performed in Ömer Aydın's operettas. She was among the founders of the Istanbul Theatre in 1960.

Toto Karaca died on 22 July 1992 in Istanbul, Turkey, and was buried in the family grave at the Şişli Armenian Cemetery.
