= Ersen ve Dadaşlar =

Ersen ve Dadaşlar, was a Turkish rock band created by Ersen Dinleten, and was popular in the 1970s Turkish psychedelic rock scene. Ersen Dinleten started to play with the band called "Kardaşlar". At first they called themselves "Ersen ve Kardaşları". After releasing two singles, they decided to change their band's name to "Ersen ve Dadaşlar". They effectively mixed the sound of classic psychedelic rock with traditional Turkish folk music and became one of the first proponents of the Turkish Psychedelic Rock genre.
