= TPAO Batman =

1963–2000 Turkish popular music band

- Origin: Turkey
- Genres: Dance music, Anatolian rock, Arranged Türkü
- Years active: 1963–2000
- Past members: Ahmet Akman - İlhan Telli - Semih Özmert; Çetin Oral - Ünal Yiğitbaş - Atilla Akman

TPAO Batman was a Turkish popular music band that was active between 1963 and 2000.

== Background ==
TPAO is the abbreviation of Türkiye Petrolleri Anonim Ortaklığı, the national petroleum company of Turkey and Batman is a recently developed city close to Turkey's only oilfield. The refinery of Batman was set up in 1955 In the 1950s, the population of Batman was only a few thousand, and most of the workers dwelled in the refinery site. The refinery administration provided social amenities including a dance ensemble.

== Band and musicians ==
The band TPAO Batman was founded in 1963 by Ahmet Akman. Initially, the ensemble was playing dance music and jazz. But they soon became familiar with the folk music of the area around the refinery, called Türkü, and they included arranged folk songs to their repertoire. Although Ahmet Akman left the group, they continued up to 2000. The band consisted of İlhan Telli (keyboard and vocals), Semih Özmert (drums), Çetin Oral (bass guitar), Ünal Yiğitbaş (saxophone) and Atilla Akman (solo guitar).

== Golden Microphone awards ==
Between 1965 and 1968, newspaper Hürriyet organized annual music contests, Golden Microphone and TPAO Batman participated in 1966, 1967 and 1968. In these contests, the participants were required to play either new creations or arranged folkloric melodies. The TPAO Batman entries were as follows :

Year	Name of the song	Rank
1966	Kaleden Top Atarlar	(Qualified for the finals)
1976	Karatoprak	(Qualified for the finals)
1968	Meşelidir Enginde Dağlar	(gold) Prize

With these melodies, the band, hitherto quite unknown outside the TPAO circles, made a name. In addition to the melodies listed above, Fırat Kenarında Yüzen Kayıklar (“The rowboats sailing in Euphrates”), a melody on the reverse side of 1966 entry record, earned them a nationwide reputation.
