= Fikret Kızılok =

Turkish rock musician (1946–2001)

Background information
- Born: 10 November 1946; Istanbul, Turkey
- Died: 22 September 2001 (aged 54) Istanbul, Turkey
- Genres: Rock, Turkish folk, political music
- Occupations: Singer, songwriter, composer
- Instruments: Vocals, guitar, acoustic bass, saz, sitar
- Years active: 1965–1999
- Labels: Sayan, Grafson, Şah Plak, Kalan Müzik
- Spouse(s): Şeyda Kızılok (m. 1973, divorced) Dicle Kızılok (m. 1993–2001)
- Website: fikretkizilok.net at the Wayback Machine (archived 2015-10-06)

Fikret Kızılok (10 November 1946 – 22 September 2001) was a Turkish rock musician. He was a pioneer of Anatolian rock, a prolific songwriter, impresario, multi-instrumentalist, and an early experimentalist. Due to a heart disease, he died on 22 September 2001.

== Early life ==
Kızılok was introduced to music during his secondary school years at the Galatasaray High School, a top high school in Turkey that produced music legends Barış Manço and Timur Selçuk as well, although Kızılok went on later to study dentistry. His first instrument was an accordion, which was presented to him on his birthday. He took his first music lessons from one of his classmates' father. His first performance was at Taksim Belediye Gazinosu as 23 April celebrations. He performed here with his music group, which Kızılok and his classmates had formed, called Fikret Kızılok and the Band, receiving good reception with the folk songs they played. Their biggest hit during this period was their cover of the folk song "Tamzara". These performances continued throughout his secondary and high school years. After giving up on playing the accordion in high school, Kızılok, who was influenced by Elvis Presley took up the guitar. Kızılok's biggest supporters at the time were Barış Manço and Timur Selçuk, who were studying in the upper classes.

== Career ==
He switched to rhythm guitar in 1963 when he met Cahit Oben. Together, they formed the group Cahit Oben 4, with Koray Oktay on bass and Erol Ulaştır on drums. Cahit Oben 4 describe themselves as a group playing Beatles-kind of music. They started performing at Çatı Gece Kulübü, a nightclub managed by İlham Gencer. As a side job, they also performed at several open-air neighbourhood concerts. Their first release in 1965 was the Beatles-inspired song "I Wanna Be Your Man". Later that year, Cahit Oben 4's second single included their first Turkish-language folksong, "Silifke'nin Yoğurdu," with the B-side featuring the first song written by Kızılok, "Hereke." Cahit Oben 4 contested at Hürriyet's 1965 Golden Microphone Music awards with their "Makaram Sarı Bağlar / Halime" release. After that, Cahit Oben broke up while Cahit Oben wanted to resume his life with his fiancee, Füsun Önal.

After taking a brief break from music to finish dentistry school, Kızılok performed alongside Barış Manço for nearly a year before releasing his first solo single, "Ay Osman – Sevgilim (Colours – Baby)." In 1969, Kızılok traveled with writer Arda Uskan to Sivas to meet famed folk poet Aşık Veysel, and to procure permission to record a cover of his song "Uzun İnce Bir Yoldayım" (I'm on a long, thin road), which started a friendship between them. Kızılok later returned to live with Veysel for several months, taking saz lessons as well. His 1969 cover of "Uzun İnce Bir Yoldayım / Benim Aşkım Beni Geçti" went to number one in the Turkish charts, and was Kızılok's first gold album. Kızılok quit music for about a year in 1973 following the death of Aşık Veysel.

While Kızılok's music hadn't previously been especially concerned with political themes, in the 1970s his music began to become more intertwined with politics. He set the poetry of a number of prominent politically active poets to music, including Ahmed Arif's "Vurulmuşum" (1971), Aşık Mahzuni Şerif's "Darağacı" (1975), and former prime minister Bülent Ecevit's "Olmasın Varsın (debuted live on TV in 1975). His album Not Defterimden (1977) featured experiments in atonal music and readings of poetry by Nazim Hikmet. However, the worsening political situation in late 1970s Turkey, and the banning of Ecevit from politics following the September 12, 1980 coup d'etat, contributed to Kızılok's forced break from music between 1977 and 1983.

Kızılok's first album following this break, Zaman Zaman (From Time to Time), featured a shift from politics to love songs. This album and the 1990 solo album, Yana Yana (Burning Inside), contained many of the songs that Kızılok is best known for today. During the same period, he collaborated with a number of musicians, including fellow singer / songwriter Bülent Ortaçgil, environmental activist and singer Leman Sam, and fretless guitarist pioneer Erkan Oğur.

== Death ==
Kızılok suffered a heart attack in 1998, the year he finished his last studio album, Mustafa Kemal – Devrimcinin Güncesi (Mustafa Kemal – A Revolutionary's Diary). Although he was working on a new album, preliminarily entitled Suya Yazılan Şarkılar, this never was to be released. After the heart attack and intensive care, his condition stabilised for some time. He wrote one last poem for the nurse who took care of him. Even though he had a cardiac pacemaker, due to a second heart attack in July 2001, he died in September 2001.

== Legacy ==
Kızılok had 13 gold records to his name and many number one singles. He was the first artist in Turkish history to be the object of a bidding war, ultimately receiving 50,000 lira to leave Sayan for Grafson. Many musicians have recorded covers of his songs, including Barış Akarsu ("Bu Kalp Seni Unutur mu?" and "Yeter Ki"), Funda Arar ("Haberin Var mı?"), Mehmet Erdem ("Bir Harmanım bu Akşam"), Mor ve Ötesi ("Sevda Çiçeği"), Leman Sam and Şevval Sam ("Gönül"), and Sibel Sezai ("Ben Gidersem"). The TV series Bu Kalp Seni Unutur mu? was named after one of his songs. Kızılok was also an innovative instrumentalist and album arranger, the first to incorporate sitar and Indian tabla within Turkish pop music.

== Discography ==
With Cahit Oben 4

- 1965: I Wanna Be Your Man / 36 24 36 (Ulaştır Plak)
- 1965: Silifke'nin Yoğurdu / Hereke (Diskofon Plak 5061)
- 1965: Makaram Sarı Bağlar / Halime (Hürriyet Gazetesi)

Fikret Kızılok ve Üç Veliaht (Fikret Kızılok and the Three Crown Princes)

- 1965: Belle Marie / Kız Ayşe (Diskofon Plak 5075)

Solo 45s

- 1967: Ay Osman – Sevgilim / Colours – Baby (Sayan FS-120)
- 1969: Uzun İnce Bir Yoldayım / Benim Aşkım Beni Geçti (Sayan FS-214)
- 1970: Yağmur Olsam / Yumma Gözün Kör Gibi (Sayan FS-220)
- 1970: Söyle Sazım / Güzel Ne Güzel Olmuşsun (Sayan FS-230)
- 1971: Vurulmuşum / Emmo (Grafson 3767)
- 1971: Gün Ola Devran Döne / Anadolu'yum (Grafson 4005, reissued as Coşkun Plak 1381)
- 1972: Leylim Leylim (Kara Tren) / Gözlerinden Bellidir (Grafson 4007)
- 1973: Köroğlu Dağları / Tutamadım Ellerini (Grafson 4010)
- 1973: Bacın Önde Ben Arkada / Koyverdin Gittin Beni (Şah Plak 5022)
- 1975: Anadolu'yum '75 / Darağacı (Şak Plak 5051)
- 1976: Biz Yanarız / Sen Bir Ceylan Olsan (Şak Plak 5055)

Fikret Kızılok ve Tehlikeli Madde (Fikret Kızılok and the Dangerous Matter)

- 1974: Haberin Var mı / Kör Pencere – Ay Battı (Şah Plak 5029)
- 1974: Aşkın Olmadığı Yerde / İnsan mıyım Mahluk muyum Ot muyum (Şah Plak 5033)

Solo albums

- 1977: Not Defterimden (Hey Plak 5008, reissued as Kalan Müzik CD 007)
- 1983: Zaman Zaman (Yonca 8038, reissued as Kalan Müzik CD 005)
- 1990: Yana Yana (unknown, reissued as Kalan Müzik CD 006)
- 1992: Olmuyo Olmuyo "Düşler" (Taç Plak)
- 1995: Demirbaş (Kalan Müzik)
- 1995: Yadigar (Kalan Müzik CD 034)
- 1998: Mustafa Kemal – Devrimcinin Güncesi (Kalan Müzik CD 111)

With Bülent Ortaçgil

- 1985: Çekirdek Hatırası – Biz Şarkılarımızı (Çekirdek Sanat Evi)
- 1986: Pencere Önü Çiçeği (Piccatura)
- 2007: Büyükler İçin Çocuk Şarkıları (Klik Müzik, posthumous release of recordings made at TRT in 1987)

Compilations

- 1975: Fikret Kızılok – 1 (Türküola Almanya 0452)
- 1975: Fikret Kızılok (Saba Almanya 1456)
- 1992: Fikret Kızılok 1968'ler (Ada Müzik 076)
- 1992: Seçme Eserler – 68'ler 1 (Kalan Müzik)
- 1993: Seçme Eserler – 68'ler 2 (Kalan Müzik)
- 1999: Gün ola devran döne (Kalan Müzik CD 151)
- 2002: Dünden Bugüne: 1965–2001 (Sony Music 508 033 2)
- 2005: Fikret Kızılok (World Psychedelia Ltd WPC6-8493)
- 2007: Edip Akbayram – Fikret Kızılok (Coşkun Plak)

Children's Albums/Books

- 1996: Vurulduk Ey Halkım (Kalan Müzik)
