= Golden Microphone (Turkey) =

Turkish music contest

The Golden Microphone (Turkish: Altın Mikrofon) was a music contest annually held between 1965 and 1968 in Turkey. It was organized by the newspaper Hürriyet. In 1960s, most of the Turkish popular music melodies were either songs from western Europe with Turkish lyrics or traditional Turkish folk melodies played with western instruments. The goal of the contest was to encourage the development of popular Turkish music either by new compositions or by using domestic sources. More formally, Hürriyet announced the goal of the contest as "Redirecting Turkish music using technique and style of western music as well as the instruments of western music".

== Winners ==
Year	Rank	Group	Title
1965	1st	Yıldırım Gürses	Gençliğe Veda
1965	2nd	Mavi Işıklar	Helvacı
1965	3rd	Silüetler	Kaşık Havası
1966	1st	Silüetler	Lorke Lorke
1966	2nd	Mavi Işıklar	Çayır Çimen Geze Geze
1966	3rd	Selçuk Alagöz	Ararım
1967	1st	Mavi Çocuklar	Develi Daylar
1967	2nd	Cem Karaca	Emrah
1967	3rd	Rana Alagöz	Konya Kabağı
1968	1st	TPAO Batman	Meşelidir Enginde Dağlar
1968	2nd	Haramiler	Arpa Buğday Daneler
1968	3rd	Moğollar	Ilgaz

== Later years ==
Altın Mikrofon was a milestone in Turkish music. Although Hürriyet gave up organizing the contest after 1968, two other newspapers tried to continue: Günaydın in 1972 and Saklambaç in 1979. But these later contests unlike the earlier contests, didn't attracted much attention and they too gave up. The results of these were as follows:

Year	Rank	Group	Title
1972	1st	Edip Akbayram	Kükredi Çimenler
1972	2nd	Salim Dündar	Bir dost bulamadım
1972	3rd	Ömer Aysan	Mış mış
1979	1st	Ünal Büyükgönenç	Dışarda Kar yağıyor
