= Hey (magazine) =

Turkish music magazine (1970–1994)

- Categories: Music and teens magazine
- Frequency: Weekly (1970-1988, 1994); Monthly (1988-1989)
- Founder: Doğan Şener
- Founded: 1970
- First issue: 18 November 1970
- Final issue: September 1994
- Company: Karacan Media Group (1970-1989); Doğan Media Group (1994)
- Country: Turkey
- Based in: Istanbul
- Language: Turkish

Hey (Turkish: Hi) was a Turkish music magazine that targeted teens. The magazine existed between 1970 and 1994. It billed itself as Turkey's only teens' and music magazine. The magazine was one of the highest-circulation publications in Turkey.

== History and profile ==
Hey was established in 1970. The first issue was released on 18 November 1970 as a supplement to the daily paper Milliyet. Later it became a separate magazine. The magazine was part of Karacan media group.

The founder of Hey was Doğan Şener. He was also the editor-in-chief of the magazine for a long time. In the mid 1980s Hulusi Tunca, a Turkish journalist, became the editor-in-chief of Hey.

Hey primarily included the music lists, radio program lists and pen pal sections. The magazine covered nearly all music genres, including Turkish pop and folk music. It also carried news and articles on movies and fashion. Regular contributors were Yener Süsoy, Erhan Akyıldız, Arda Uskan ve Ercüment Akman. Near to its closure Hey also published a supplement called Hey Girl which addressed teenager girls.

Hey sold weekly 60,000 copies when it was extremely popular among Turkish teens. In 1980 it enjoyed a circulation of 100,000 copies. The frequency of Hey was weekly until 28 June 1988 when it was switched to monthly. On 15 March 1989 the magazine ceased publication. It was restarted by the Doğan media group in April 1994 as a weekly supplement to Milliyet. However, the magazine ended publication again in September 1994.
