= Ankara Radio =

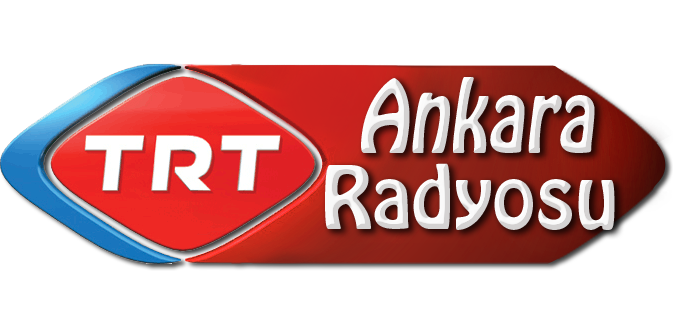

Turkey
- Frequency: TSR: 5

Programming
- Format: Turkish pop music, Turkish rock and Turkish classical music

Ownership
- Owner: TRT

Links
- Website: trt.net.tr/radyo

Ankara Radio (Turkish: Ankara Radyosu) is a nationwide radio network broadcasting from Ankara. Its first broadcast was on 6 November 1927, by a 5 kW longwave AM transmitter over 1554 meters.

== See also ==
- Radyo 2
