= Cem Karaca =

Turkish rock singer and songwriter (1945–2004)

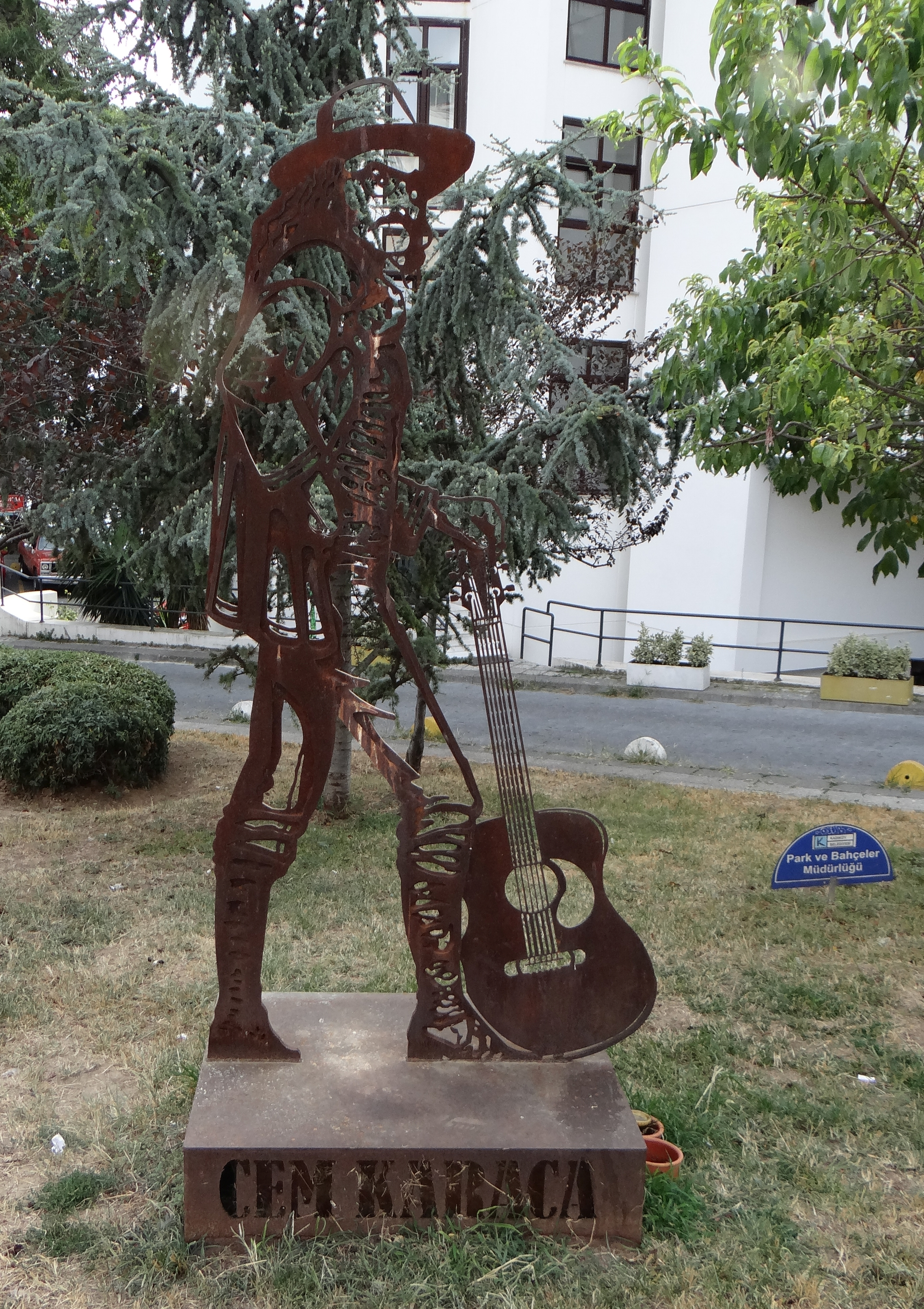

Background information
- Also known as: Cem Ağabey
- Born: Muhtar Cem Karaca; 5 April 1945; Bakırköy, Turkey
- Died: 8 February 2004 (aged 58) Istanbul, Turkey
- Genres: Anatolian rock; protest song; progressive rock; symphonic rock; hard rock; psychedelic rock
- Occupations: Singer-songwriter; composer
- Instruments: Vocals; guitar
- Years active: 1961–2004
- Formerly of: Moğollar, Kurtalan Ekspres, Apaşlar

Muhtar Cem Karaca (5 April 1945 – 8 February 2004) was a Turkish rock musician and one of the most important figures in the Anatolian rock movement. He was a graduate of Robert College. He worked with various Turkish rock bands such as Apaşlar, Kardaşlar, Moğollar and Dervişan. With these bands, he brought a new understanding and interpretation to Turkish rock. He became a defining voice of protest and social commentary in Turkey from the late 1960s through the 1980s.

== Biography ==
Karaca was the only child of Mehmet İbrahim Karaca, a theatre actor of Azerbaijani origin, and İrma Felekyan, a popular opera, theatre, and movie actress of Armenian origin. His first group was called Dynamites and was a classic rock cover band. Later he joined Jaguars, an Elvis Presley cover band. In 1967, he started to write his own music, joining the band Apaşlar (The Rowdies), his first Turkish language group. The same year, he participated in the Golden Microphone contest, a popular music contest in which he won second place with his song Emrah. In 1969, Karaca and bass-player Serhan Karabay left Apaşlar and started an original Anatolian group called Kardaşlar (The Brothers).

In 1972, Karaca joined the group Moğollar (The Mongols) and wrote one of his best-known songs, "Namus Belası". However, Cahit Berkay, the leader of Moğollar, wanted an international reputation for his band, and he left for France to take the group to the next level. Karaca, who wanted to continue his Anatolian beat sound, left Moğollar and started his own band Dervişan (Dervishes) in 1974. Karaca and Dervişan sang poetic and progressive songs.

In the 1970s, Turkey was dealing with political violence between supporters of the left and the right, separatist movements and the rise of Islamism. As the country fell into chaos, the government suspected Cem Karaca of involvement in rebel organisations. He was accused of treason for being a separatist thinker and a Marxist-Leninist. The Turkish government tried to portray Karaca as a man who was unknowingly writing songs to start a revolution. One politician was quoted as saying, "Karaca is simply calling citizens to a bloody war against the state." Dervişan was ultimately dissolved at the end of 1977. In 1978, he founded Edirdahan, an acronym for "from Edirne to Ardahan"; the westernmost and the easternmost provinces of Turkey. He recorded one LP with Edirdahan called "Safinaz".

In early 1979, Karaca left for Cologne, West Germany for business reasons. In 1980, he began singing in German with the song Nazim Hikmet - Kız Çocuğu (Little girl): Cem performed the German verses alternating with his best friend, manager, producer, arranger and bandleader/bass player/keyboarder/drummer, guitar player Ralf Mähnhöfer accompanying him on grand piano, solo or with the band Anatology, singing the song in the Turkish language.

Turkey continued to spin out of control with military curfews and the 1980 Turkish coup d'état on September 12, 1980. General Kenan Evren took over the government and temporarily banned all the nation's political parties. After the coup, many intellectuals, including writers, artists and journalists, were arrested. A warrant was issued for the arrest of Karaca by the government of Turkey.

The state invited Karaca back several times, but Karaca, not knowing what would happen upon his return, decided not to come back.

While Karaca was in Germany his father died, but he could not return to attend the funeral. After some time, the Turkish government decided to strip Cem Karaca of his Turkish citizenship, keeping the arrest warrant active.

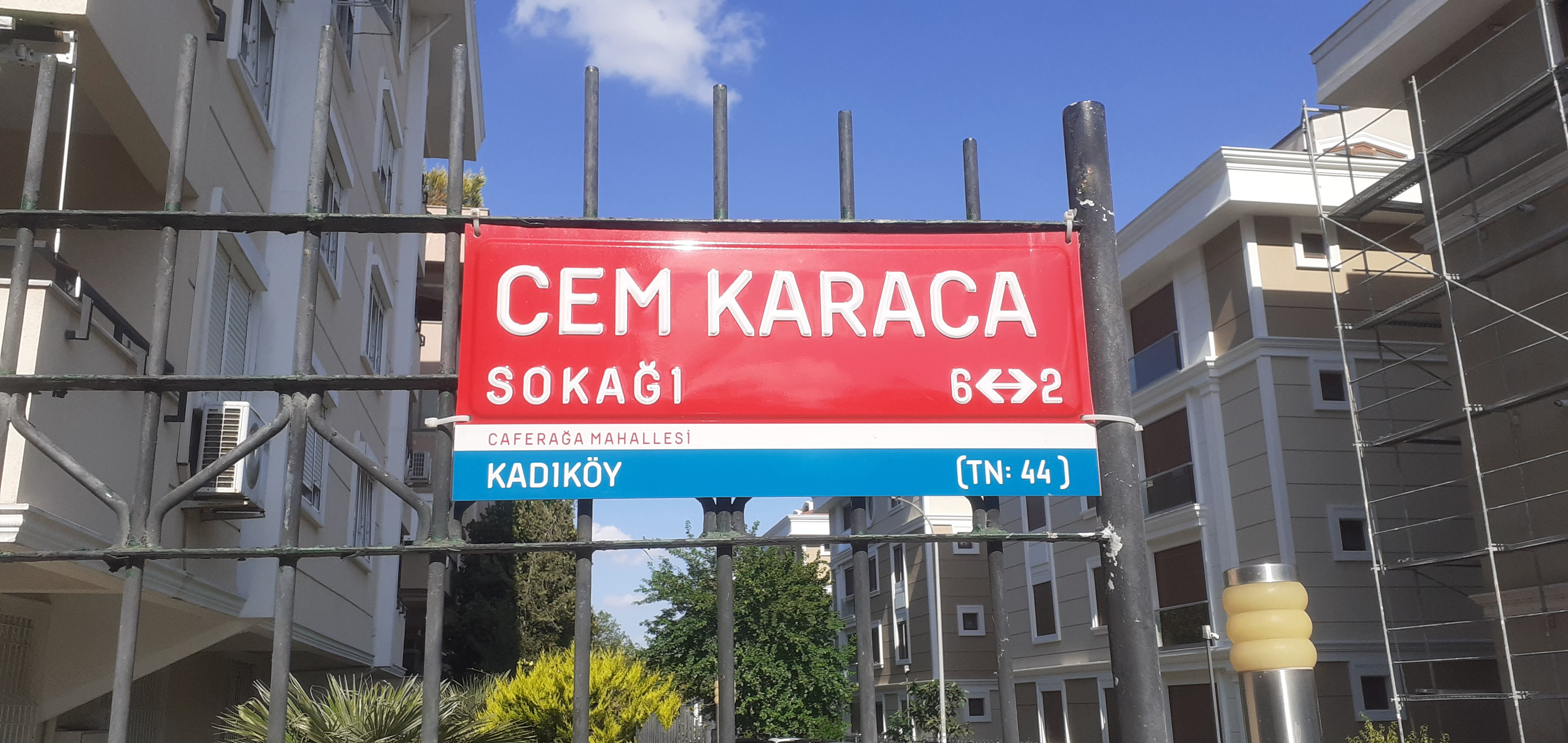
Cem Karaca Street in Kadikoy, Istanbul

Several years later, in 1987, the prime minister and leader of the Turkish Motherland Party, Turgut Özal, issued an amnesty for Karaca. Shortly afterward, he returned to Turkey. His return also brought a new album with it, which released on September 12 of that year, Merhaba Gençler ve Her Zaman Genç Kalanlar ("Hello, The Young and The Young at Heart"), one of his most influential works. His return home was received cheerfully by his fans, but during his absence Karaca had lost the young audience and acquired only a few new listeners.

In his later years Karaca stated that he "made peace with Allah" and met Islamic scholar Fethullah Gülen multiple times. He recited the poetry of Gulen in an album in 2001. He released his song "Allah Yar" ("Allah the Lover") in 1999.

Karaca died of a heart attack on February 8, 2004, and was interred at Karacaahmet Cemetery in the Üsküdar district of Istanbul.

== Musical style ==
Karaca's the music styles range from severe mellowness chanson to powerful progressive song-based rock music. His first records were progressive, in a rock-sense, and Safinaz is symphonic piece comparable to a more western progressive rock albums.

== Discography ==
=== 45s ===
- Emrah/Karacaoğlan (1967) (with Apaşlar)
- Hudey / Vahşet / Bang Bang / Shakin' All Over (1967) (with Apaşlar)
- Emrah / Hücum / Karacaoğlan / Ayşen (1967) (with Apaşlar)
- Ümit Tarlaları/Anadolu Oyun Havası/Suya Giden Allı Gelin/Nasıl Da Geçtin (1967) (with Apaşlar)
- İstanbul'u Dinliyorum/Oy Bana Bana (1968) (with Apaşlar and Ferdy Klein Band)
- Oy Babo/Hikaye (1968) (with Apaşlar)
- İstanbul/Why (1968) (with Apaşlar and Ferdy Klein Band)
- Emrah 1970/Karanlık Yollar (1968) (with Apaşlar and Ferdy Klein Band)
- Resimdeki Gözyaşları/Emrah (1968) (with Apaşlar and Ferdy Klein Band)
- Resimdeki Gözyaşları/Şans Çocuğu (1968) (with Apaşlar and Ferdy Klein Band)
- Tears/No, No, No (1968) (with Apaşlar and Ferdy Klein Band)
- Ayrılık Günümüz/Gılgamış (1969) (with Apaşlar and Ferdy Klein Band)
- Zeyno/Niksar (1969) (with Apaşlar and Ferdy Klein Band)
- Bu Son Olsun/Felek Beni (1969) (with Apaşlar and Ferdy Klein Band)
- Emmioğlu/O Leyli (1970) (with Ferdy Klein Band)
- Kendim Ettim kendim Buldum/Erenler (1970) (with Ferdy Klein Band)
- Adsız/Unut Beni (1970) (with Ferdy Klein Band)
- Muhtar/Baba (1970) (with Ferdy Klein Band)
- Dadaloğlu/Kalender (1970) (with Kardaşlar)
- Oy Gülüm Oy/Kara Sevda (1971) (with Kardaşlar)
- Tatlı Dillim/Demedim Mi (1971) (with Kardaşlar)
- Kara Yılan/Lümüne (1971) (with Kardaşlar)
- Acı Doktor (Kısım 1)/Acı Doktor (Kısım 2) (1971) (with Kardaşlar)
- Kara Üzüm/Mehmet'e Ağıt (1971) (with Kardaşlar)
- Askaros Deresi/Üryan Geldim (1972) (with Kardaşlar)
- Obur Dünya/El Çek Tabib (1973) (with Moğollar)
- Gel Gel/Üzüm Kaldı (1973) (with Moğollar)
- Namus Belası/Gurbet (1974) (with Moğollar)
- Beyaz Atlı/Yiğitler (1974) (with Dervişan)
- Tamirci Çırağı/Nerdesin? (1975) (with Dervişan)
- Mutlaka Yavrum/Kavga (1975) (with Dervişan)
- Beni Siz Delirttiniz/Niyazi (1975) (with Dervişan)
- Parka/İhtarname (1976) (with Dervişan)
- Mor Perşembe/Bir Mirasyediye Ağıt (1977) (with Dervişan)
- 1 Mayıs/Durduramayacaklar Halkın Coşkun Akan Selini (1977) (with Dervişan)

=== LPs ===
- Apaşlar-Kardaşlar (1972)
- Cem Karaca'nın Apaşlar, Kardaşlar, Moğollar ve Ferdy Klein Orkestrasına Teşekkürleriyle (1974)
- Nem Kaldı (1975)
- Parka (1977)
- Yoksulluk Kader Olamaz (1977) (1)
- Safinaz (1978) (2)
- Hasret (1980) (It was sold as LP and tape)
- Bekle Beni (1982) (It was sold as tape only)
- Die Kanaken (1984)
- Merhaba Gençler ve Her Zaman Genç Kalanlar (1987) (CD, cassette, LP)

=== Other albums ===
- Töre (1988) (It was sold as CD) by Oğuz Abadan Orchestra
- Yiyin Efendiler (1990)
- Nerde Kalmistik (1992)
- Bindik Bir Alamete (1999)
- Kahpe Bizans (2000)
- Hayvan Terli (2004) (Single)

=== Collection albums ===
- The Best of Cem Karaca Volume 1 (1996)
- The Best of Cem Karaca Volume 2 (1997)
- The Best of Cem Karaca Volume 3 (2000)
- The Best of Cem Karaca Volume 4 (2001)
- The Best of Cem Karaca Volume 5 (2002)
- Ölümsüzler (Immortals) (2004) (posthumously)
- Ölümsüzler 2 (Immortals 2) (2005) (posthumously)
- Mutlaka Yavrum (Absolutely, baby) (2006) (posthumously)

== See also ==
- Tears of Cem Karaca - biopic of the rockstars life

== Literature ==
- Martin Stokes: Music in Performance: Cem Karaca, Live. In: Virginia Danielson, Dwight Reynolds, Scott Marcus (Hrsg.): The Garland Encyclopedia of World Music. Band 6: The Middle East. Garland, London 2002, S. 243–245
- Türkischer Akademiker- und Künstlerverein, in Berlin (author), publisher: Jürgen Kleindienst (1977): Nazim Hikmet - Sie haben Angst vor unseren Liedern, documentation, language: German-Turkish ISBN 9783885200093
