= Erdinç Ecevit Yıldız =

Turkish singer

Erdinç Ecevit
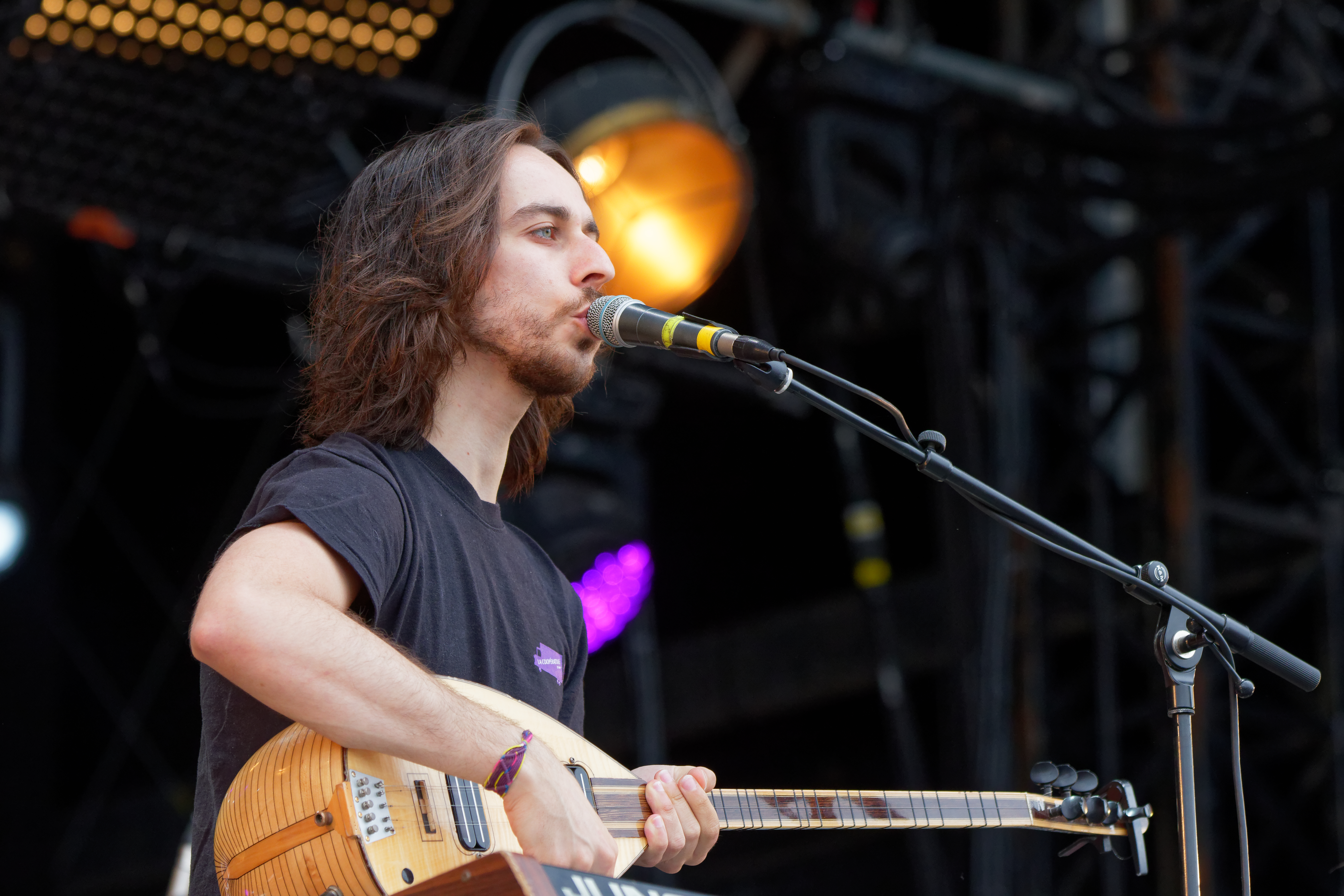
- Erdinç performing at Vieilles Charrues Festival in 2018

Background information
- Genres: Anatolian rock; Turkish folk; psychedelic rock

Erdinç Ecevit is a Turkish-Dutch musician best known as vocalist and bağlama player for Anatolian rock band Altin Gün.

== Biography ==
According to Altin Gün bandmate Daniel Smienk, Erdinç was born in the Netherlands to Turkish parents.

== Music career ==
In 2016, Erdinç responded to an ad posted on Facebook by Jasper Verhulst who was seeking to form a psychedelic Turkish folk band which would soon become known as Altin Gün. Erdinç was recruited to the band as one of two lead vocalists of Turkish origin - the other being Merve Daşdemir.

The band has released five studio albums since their debut album in 2018. In 2019, their second album, Gece was nominated for the 62nd Annual Grammy Awards (2019) in the Best World Music Album category. Together they have made multiple tours of Europe and North America and have performed at Coachella. Their fifth studio album was released in March 2023.

At a 2019 show in Ontario, Erdinç performed with broken ribs after suffering a frisbee accident.
