= İlahi Morluk =

1991 song by Erkin Koray

"İlahi Morluk" (Divine Bruise) is a song written and performed by Turkish rock artist Erkin Koray. The song was released on Koray's thirteenth album, titled Tek Başına Konser, which was released in 1991. The genres of the song is Anatolian rock and psychedelic rock. From some music authorities in Turkey, this song is the best work of Erkin Koray. With this song, he showed people that they don't need too many words to compose a great song. This song is also seen as a touchstone in Turkish music culture. In addition, the music of the song is more effective than the lyrics. It has been observed that this song's melody is similar to Black Sabbath's "Killing Yourself to Live". Also, there is a book called İlahi Morluk, which was released in 2016 about the rock musician's comeback to the stage. The song's name İlahi Morluk has many meanings.

1-The purple birthmark usually seen in pops and hips of newborn children and when the children reach the age of 5-6 it disappears. 2-Some of the Christian clerics have a purple colors on ceremonial clothes, as the purple color represents a special class of clergy. 3-It is the purple that defines the level that the opus dei sect's people have in response to the actions they apply to them.

There is a live version of the song, which was recorded by Turkish National TV channel in 1975.
