= The Trial (German band) =

- Also known as: New Trial
- Origin: Berlin, Germany and Istanbul, Turkey
- Genres: New wave, experimental rock, post-punk
- Years active: 1985–present
- Label: Zodiakom
- Members: αlabay Pfeuti; Lady Ophreusis
- Past members: M. Strenge; T. Liebscher; T. Warlo; B. Möhrle; A. Schwab; K. Jehle; A. Thoma; S. Kerzenmacher; T. Seiter; M. Vassallo; Mik@
- Website: www.thetrial.de

The Trial are an experimental German-Turkish-Swiss alternative-band, playing music somewhere in between rock, pop, new wave, industrial and several other styles. They are one of the groups that attracted attention for being "different" from what was and is usually known as Turkish popular music in Germany (arabesk, Turkish hip hop, ...).

== History ==
The Trial was founded in 1985 in Berlin by M. Strenge and αlabay, both dealing basically with sociocritical issues those times. The musical background was in the beginning noise and experimental sound collages, contributed by αlabay. In 1987 they split up and αlabay started creating structured music. He had no intention of belonging to a specific music genre but the influences of The Cure, Joy Division and The Sisters of Mercy gave his music an obvious distinction. In 1988 αlabay left Berlin and moved to Baden-Württemberg. Between 1989 and 1995, the band had an active phase with concerts.

From 1998 on the band started to create several albums via internet and telephone but only performed two concerts. From 2001 to 2005, a concept album was recorded (Statements & Unanswered Questions). This was a reinterpretation of an unrealized album from 1986 and done together with the co-founder M. Strenge. He had a nearly fatal accident in 1996, thus this reinterpretation of sociocritical points of view was written from a completely new perspective.

In 2006 the group decided to act more as a band. That year also marked a turning point, as a completely Turkish work had been recorded for the first time. Before that only loose Turkish tracks were done. The decision came after a stay in Izmir and Istanbul in 2005. That sojourn revealed the full dimension of how the Turkish alternative-scene had altered. Groups like Replikas, Mor ve Ötesi or Duman had brought in new wave and alternative elements into the music; in the past, alternative basically meant crossover or metal-influenced.

== Background ==
The Trial was founded in the 1980s in West Berlin, in a period marked by the Cold War and social tensions. The accusing, sociocritical and pessimistic lyrics let bud the idea of being in trial with the society – the trial: namely the trial and process (alluding to Franz Kafka’s The Process/The Trial). The ambiguity of the name accommodates the experimental aspect of the music. In the beginning, M. Strenge was the one who was more sociocritical, αlabay rather wrote emotional or even banal wave/pop lyrics. A special attribute of their work was that the lyrics were not monolingual. Besides English, they were written in German, French and Turkish. Turkish had an extra role due it being rare in alternative music of the period. In 2005/2006 αlabay realized that several things one cannot think or feel in German or English were better expressed in Turkish. As concepts may be more or less translatable, multiple languages provided a tool kit to break free of the constriction of a sole language and cultural way of thinking.

== Instruments ==
The first recordings were made employing every instrument or device that was available, starting with an acoustic guitar and a small Yamaha PSS-401. From 1988 on they used more exotic equipment such as the Appalachian dulcimer, psaltery, or monochord. As main instruments, drums, piano, and bass were added. The electric guitar had been played occasionally since 1987 but it did not have its typical leading part of rock music until 1989. Years with "normal" rock instrumentation followed, sometimes supported with violin or saxophone. In 2000 an important novelty was introduced: the saz (long-necked lute) became a leading instrument. Since then, several alienated parts were recorded with it in a way never heard before in Turkish rock music. Later on the group started to also use computers, bins, refrigerators and field recordings.

== Discography (excerpts) ==
- Gift (1988; Trial Communications), MC
- Lavenderblue Dream (1988; Trial Communications), MC
- The Forgotten Clutch (1988; Waldeck Sound), MC
- Temple Of The Bergamotte (1989; Waldeck Sound), MC
- You'll Never Fail Until You Stop Trying (1990; Waldeck Sound), MC
- Existence (1993; Trial Communications), MC
- Public Domain (1996; Trial Communications), MC
- Prænatal Postmodern (1998; Zodiakom), 2CDr
- Nacht der Illusion (2001; Zodiakom), CDr
- Dolunay (2002; Zodiakom), CDr
- The Geisterfahrer EP (2003; Zodiakom), CD
- Statements & Unanswered Questions (2006; Zodiakom), 2CDr
- Lucifer Lux (2006; Zodiakom), 2CDr
- Mimarlar (2007; Zodiakom), CDr
- Feuerblume (2008; Zodiakom), CDr
- Tuz Katedrali (2009; Zodiakom), CDr/MP3
- Köln Oturumu (2011; Zodiakom), CDr/MP3
- Hürriyet (2013; Zodiakom), CDr/MP3
- Postmortem (2013; Zodiakom), MP3
- Esaret (2013; Zodiakom/con-area), MP3
- unlustig (2015; Zodiakom), CDr/MP3

== Sampler contributions ==
- Godfathers Of German Gothic III: Heaven (Asylum 4) (1997; Subterranean/Euro Media), CD
- dssg Sampler: 1668 (2001; dssg), CD
- dssg Sampler 2: Tinsmith & Crossbow (2003; dssg), CD
- freiburgtapesvolume 4: Üç küp (2008; jazzhaus records), CD

== Linkages ==
- The Trial was renamed to New Trial between 1993 and 2003 – this had two reasons: 1993 had to clean the slate and the group wanted to contrast from the nearly homonymous electro-band Trial. In 2003 the old name was readopted. Since 2005 the old and new names have been protected.
- αlabay is also a member of unlustig!, a new wave group.
- Pfeuti has released two albums with the hardcore-formation Radical Development. He is also member of the band Tumorchester.
- mik@ erstwhile played with the industrial-acts Sheba Wore No Nylons and DL, amongst others. Later on he worked solo in the Industrial sector as The M.M.V.P.
- M. Vassallo who had collaborated between 1996 and 2003, is the founder of the dark ambient-project Arbre Noir.
- There were and are cooperations and collaborations with different musicians and artists.
