= Elektronik Türküler =

Studio album by Erkin Koray
- Released: 1974
- Genre: Anatolian rock, psychedelic rock, acid rock, progressive rock, Turkish folk
- Length: 38:10
- Label: Doğan (Turkey), World Psychedelia Ltd. (South Korea), GDR (Italy), Pharaway Sounds (Spain), Nexus Records (Germany)

Erkin Koray chronology
Erkin Koray (1973)	Elektronik Türküler (1974)	2 (1976)

Elektronik Türküler (Turkish pronunciation: [ˈelectɾonic tyɾˈcyleɾ], "Electronic Folk Songs [of Turkey]") is the second album by Turkish rock musician Erkin Koray, originally released by Doğan Plakcılık in 1974. This is his first work to be recorded for the LP format, save a previous compilation of 45 rpm singles which his output had been restricted to until the mid-1970s.

Stylistically, it combines psychedelic and progressive rock influences with traditional Turkish elements. This album is one of the more internationally acknowledged examples of Anatolian rock.

The album was rereleased on CD by World Psychedelia Ltd. in 1999 (WPC6-8461).

== Track listing ==
All tracks are written by Erkin Koray, except where noted

No.	Title	Length
1.	"Karlı Dağlar" (Hayrullah Yurttaş)	3:42
2.	"Sır"	2:50
3.	"Hele Yar" (Trad.)	6:20
4.	"Korkulu Rüya"	1:30
5.	"Yalnızlar Rıhtımı" (Kemal İnci)	4:39
6.	"Cemalim" (Refik Başaran of Ürgüp)	7:46
7.	"İnat"	2:13
8.	"Türkü" (Nazım Hikmet, Ruhi Su)	9:04

== Personnel ==
- Erkin Koray: Electric guitar, acoustic guitar, bağlama, piano, keyboards, lead vocals
- Sedat Avcı: Drums, bongos, percussion
- Ahmet Güvenç: Bass guitar
- Doruk Onatkut: Sound recording
