= 2 (Erkin Koray album) =

Studio album by Erkin Koray
- Released: 1976
- Genre: Anatolian rock, Turkish folk, psychedelic rock, acid rock, hard rock
- Length: 42:30
- Label: Doğan (Turkey), World Psychedelia Ltd. (South Korea), Nosmokerecords (Portugal)

Erkin Koray chronology
| Elektronik Türküler (1974) | 2 (1976) | Erkin Koray Tutkusu (1977) |

2 or Erkin Koray 2 is the third studio album by Turkish rock musician Erkin Koray. Stylistically, this album leans more towards traditional Turkish music styles.

== Track listing ==
All tracks are written by Erkin Koray.

| No. | Title | Length |
|---|---|---|
| 1. | "Şaşkın" | 4:29 |
| 2. | "Eyvah" | 3:03 |
| 3. | "Fesuphanallah" | 3:37 |
| 4. | "Sevince" | 5:18 |
| 5. | "Estarabim" | 5:19 |
| 6. | "Arap Saçı" | 3:47 |
| 7. | "Hayat Bir Teselli" | 5:21 |
| 8. | "Komşu Kızı" | 4:04 |
| 9. | "Gönül Salıncağı" | 4:08 |
| 10. | "Tımbıllı" | 3:55 |
