= Gençlik İle Elele =

Studio album by Mustafa Özkent and his Orchestra
- Released: 1973
- Recorded: 1972
- Studio: Grafson Studios, Istanbul
- Genre: Anatolian rock; pop; jazz; funk; psychedelia
- Length: 30:31
- Label: Evren
- Producer: Ali Avaz

Mustafa Özkent chronology
Gençlik İle Elele (1973)	Elif (1975)

Gençlik İle Elele is the debut studio album by Turkish musician and composer Mustafa Özkent, released in 1973 through Evren Records. Largely unnoticed and obscure until the 2000s, the record achieved critical and commercial success in the Western world following its reissue by British Finders Keepers record label in 2006.

Stylistically, the album features "funky instrumental pop and jazz numbers", as well as psychedelia tracks, all informed by Turkish folk music, rock and R&B influences.

== Critical reception ==
Professional ratings
Review scores
Source	Rating
PopMatters	6/10

The album generally received positive reviews. PopMatters critic Deanne Sole described the record as a "half an hour of wordless Turkish psychedelica chilled to a nice consistency, being neither too heavy nor superficial." Sole also stated that Özkent "blends his Turkish folk influences so perfectly into the modernity of the psyche-jazz-funk that you might not even notice them unless you knew what you were listening for." Keith Kawaii of Tiny Mix Tapes, who described the record as "quite a slice of that time and a real artifact," stated that it "endlessly plods along, riding some kind of universal groove that crosses boundaries and borders just to get you moving."

== Track listing ==
All songs are arranged by Mustafa Özkent.

1. "Üsküdar'a Giderken" – 2:01
2. "Burçak Tarlaları" – 2:56
3. "Dolana Dolana" – 4:35
4. "Karadır Kara" – 2:55
5. "Emmioğlu" – 3:02
6. "Çarşamba" – 2:18
7. "Zeytinyağlı" – 3:45
8. "Silifke" – 3:35
9. "Lorke" – 2:24
10. "Ayaş" – 3:00

== Personnel ==
All credits adapted from album liner notes.

- Mustafa Özkent – guitar, arrangements
- Cahit Oben – guitar
- Merih Dumlu – bass guitar
- Ümit Aksu – organ
