= Mustafa Özkent =

Turkish musician, composer and arranger

- Origin: Ankara, Turkey
- Genres: Anatolian rock; funk; psychedelia; pop; jazz
- Occupations: Musician; composer; arranger; producer
- Instrument: Guitar
- Years active: 1960–present
- Label: Evren

Mustafa Özkent is a Turkish musician, composer and arranger. Best known for his 1973 album, Gençlik İle Elele, he also earned a reputation as an in-demand session player, arranger, and producer, "creating music that fused psychedelic and pop/rock influences with R&B grooves and jazz-influenced improvisations." He was referred to by Andy Votel as the "Dr. Frankenstein of Anatolian pop".

== Biography ==
Özkent started his professional career in the band the Teenagers in 1960. Embarking a career as a session musician and arranger, Özkent signed with Evren Records which was known for its high production standards and audiophile recording techniques. He started recording Gençlik İle Elele with a hand-picked team of musicians and released it 1973. In 1975, he went to Belgium and the Netherlands to study music. Later, he stayed musically active in Turkey, releasing solo records and producing music.

In 2006, Gençlik İle Elele was reissued by British Finders Keepers record label, achieving rave reviews and commercial success. Following the success of the reissue, Özkent embarked a tour, performing the songs off the record on festivals such as Le Guess Who? and Europalia.

== Discography ==
Releases

- Gençlik İle Elele (1973)
- Elif (1975)
- Günün Sevilen Şarkıları - 2 (1992)
- Mazideki Şarkılar - 1 (1992)
- Dijital Gitar (2005)
- Dijital Piano (2006)
- Funk Anatolian (2017)
- Psychedelic sampling (2021)
