= Erkin Koray (album) =

1973 studio album by Erkin Koray

Studio album by Erkin Koray
- Released: 1973
- Genres: Anatolian rock, psychedelic rock, acid rock, hard rock, Turkish folk
- Length: 42:51 (original release); 68:59 (World Psychedelia Ltd. rerelease)
- Labels: Istanbul (Turkey), World Psychedelia Ltd. (South Korea)

Erkin Koray chronology
Erkin Koray (1973)	Elektronik Türküler (1974)

Erkin Koray is the first studio album by Turkish rock musician Erkin Koray. The album is a collection of singles dating from 1967 - 1973. In 2006 the album was rereleased on CD, with 8 bonus tracks, by World Psychedelia Ltd.

'Çiçek Dagi' (Mountain of Flowers) was originally performed by the Erkin Koray Dörtlüsü Quartet at the Altın Mikrofon (Golden Microphone) contest in 1968, at which, they won fourth place. 'Sana Birşey Olmuş' (Something Has Happened to You) is a cover of the song "Land of a Thousand Dances" in Turkish. The songs 'Nihansin Dideden' (You are Hidden From Sight), 'İstemem' (I Don't Want), and 'Köperüden Geçti Gelin' (The Bride Crossed Over The Bridge) were recorded by Koray and his band Yeralti Dörtlüsü (The Underground Quartet). 'Yağmur' and 'Aşka İnanmıyorum' were recorded by the Erkin Koray Süper Group. 'Züleyha' was recorded by Erkin Koray & Ter. 'Mesafeler' and 'Silinmeyen Hatıralar' were recorded by [Erkin Koray's group] Stop. The group never got to the recording stage. 'Mesafeler' and 'Silinmeyen Hatıralar' were the only two songs from Stop's rehearsals to be released.

== Track listing ==
All tracks are written by Erkin Koray, except when noted.

No.	Title	Length
1.	"Mesafeler"	3:40
2.	"Aşkımız Bitecek"	3:22
3.	"Yağmur"	3:41
4.	"Silinmeyen Hatıralar"	4:11
5.	"İstemem"	3:29
6.	"Çiçek Dagi"	2:39
7.	"Nihansin Dideden"	4:05
8.	"Sana Birşeyler Olmuş" (Chris Kenner arr. Erkin Koray)	3:08
9.	"Seni Her Gördüğümde"	3:22
10.	"Aşka İnanmıyorum"	3:34
11.	"Kızları Da Alın Askere"	3:32
12.	"Anma Arkadaş"	4:04

=== World Psychedelia Bonus Tracks ===
No.	Title	Length
1.	"Belki Birgün Anlarsın"	2:34
2.	"Köprüden Geçti Gelin"	2:51
3.	"Yine Yalnızım"	3:57
4.	"İlahi Morluk"	3:33
5.	"Anadolu'da Sevdim"	3:20
6.	"Züleyha"	3:13
7.	"Gel Bak Ne Söylicem"	3:33
8.	"Dost Acı Söyler"	3:05
