= Agustín de Zárate =

Spanish

- Born: c. 1514; Valladolid, Kingdom of Castile, Spain
- Died: c. 1589 (aged 74–75); Seville, Kingdom of Castile, Spain
- Occupations: Civil servant, chronicler and historian
- Parent(s): Lope Diaz de Zárate (father); Isabel de Polanco (mother)
- Relatives: Jerónima de Zárate (sister); Polo de Ondegardo (nephew)

Academic work
- Notable works: Historia del descubrimiento y conquista del Perú (History of discovery and conquest of Peru)

Signature
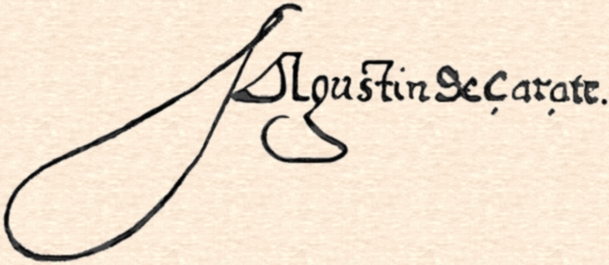

Agustín de Zárate (Valladolid, c. 1514 - Seville, c. 1589) was a Spanish colonial, Contador general de cuentas (state financial auditor), civil servant, chronicler and historian. His work Historia del descubrimiento y conquista del Perú (History of discovery and conquest of Peru) recounts the first years after the arrival of the Spaniards in the Inca Empire including the civil war between the viceroy and the encomenderos and up to the death of Gonzalo Pizarro in 1548. It is considered one of the most notable chronicles of the Spanish colonization of the Americas that have been preserved up to the present. First published in Antwerp in 1555, re-published in Venice in 1563 and then revised and published again in Seville in 1577, it was translated into English, French, Italian and German and can be considered a "best seller of the 16th Century".

== Biography ==
=== Family and early life ===
Zárate was born around 1514 in Valladolid, when the city was the capital of the kingdom of Castile, to a family that had strong ties to the royal family. He was the only son of Lope Diaz de Zárate and Isabel de Polanco. His father was a court official who served as escribano de cámara (secretary, chamber clerk) in the Council of the Supreme Inquisition and since 1512 he was also secretary of the Council of Castile, the highest administrative and judicial body of the Spanish monarchy at that time. Lope Diaz resigned in favor of his son Agustín who was named, at the age of about eight, as secretary of the Council, with the right to exercise the position after he had reached the age of eighteen. This allowed the young Zárate to become in 1532 secretary of the Council of Castile, with a quite meager salary of 9,000 maravedis per year. Most presumably immediately afterwards he married Catalina de Bayona, from Medina del Campo, the eldest of the daughters of the court butcher's supplier, owner of a considerable fortune, which provided Zárate a dowry of three thousand ducats.

In March 1538, Zárate's father died at the age of 62 in Valladolid. When the partition of his assets was carried out, Agustín received the sum of 564,525 maravedis, distributed in household furniture, silver objects and mainly, income titles in the jurisdiction of Valladolid and the nearby country. Through the same will Polo de Ondegardo, Zárate's nephew, received a special grant of 90 ducats to complete his studies at the University of Salamanca.

The other half of his inheritance went to his sister, Jerónima de Zárate, mother of Polo de Ondegardo. Moreover in his will, Agustín's father had stipulated: "I send by special legacy to the secretary Agustin de Zárate, my son, all my books, of whatever faculty they may be, and all my weapons, of whatever quality they may be". The legacy of books allowed for the transmission of cultural baggage within the family of Castilian bureaucrats with an inclination towards letters according to the orientations of Humanism. Although the education of Zárate did not formally go beyond an elementary level, it is evident, through his writings, that he cultivated the reading of humanistic works in accordance with the prevailing intellectual current at the beginning of the 16th century.

=== Mission in South America ===
The enormous amount of gold and silver collected in Hispanic America since its discovery and the loose control over the economic interests of the Crown motivated the dispatch of officials with broad powers, in charge of putting order in the fiscal management of the colonies. The enactment of the New Laws in 1542, by Charles V, Holy Roman Emperor (King Charles I of Spain) intended to prevent the exploitation and mistreatment of the indigenous peoples of the Americas by the encomenderos, through a limitation of their power and dominion over groups of natives, but also limiting their economic freedom. It was then resolved to dispatch some financial state auditors to the viceroyalties of America.

Zárate was an officer with good experience in court affairs and was chosen by the ruling prince (later king) Philip II of Spain for auditing the administration of the Royal Treasury in South America in the provinces of Peru and Tierra Firme. Thus in August 1543 Zárate resigned his post as secretary of the Council of Castile and was charged as contador general for these territories with a salary of 800,000 maravedis per year plus a refund of costs of 100,000 marvedis, four black slaves and a given amount of goods free of taxes.

His mission included also reviewing the work done by the Peruvian governor Cristóbal Vaca de Castro, taking care that the Crown taxes (generally equal to one fifth of any income) and other rights were paid in full. Moreover on the way to Peru, Zárate had to perform a fiscal audit on the accounts of the province of Tierra Firma on the Caribbean coast.

Zárate left Spain from Sanlúcar de Barrameda on 3 November 1543 on a galleon part of the huge fleet of 52 ships captained by the first viceroy of Peru, Blasco Núñez Vela, with a group of friends and relatives, including his two nephews Polo de Ondegardo and Diego de Zárate, the judges of the new Real Audiencia (Royal Tribunal) to be set up in Lima, the newly appointed governor of Nicaragua Rodrigo de Contreras and the public notaries Antón and Cristóbal Nieto; the former became Zárate's faithful secretary. On that ship traveled also Diego Martín, cleric, butler to Hernando Pizarro, who was charged of the interests of his lord in Peru and who carried out propaganda action spreading a negative image of the viceroy in favor of the Peruvian encomenderos who were contrary to the enforcement of the New Laws.

Zárate arrived at the port of Nombre de Dios, on the Atlantic coast of Panama, on 9 January 1544. There he immediately started his task of investigating the administration of the Royal Treasury officers in Tierra Firme.

He reached Lima on 26 June 1544 just a few days before the official opening of the Real Audiencia (tribunal) and a couple of months after the start of the encomenderos' uprising.

In revising the accounts of the royal treasury in Lima, Zárate noted that they were “taken without keeping in them the style and form and good order” so that he decided to undertake anew the examination of all the records since Francisco Pizarro's conquest expedition some 15 years before. According to a note by Anton Nieto - Zárate's secretary - the officials of the king and the people who attended them were complaining about this audit by Zárate and could no longer bear him.

=== Peru civil war ===
The main task of viceroy Núñez Vela was to enforce the New Laws, but the encomenderos protested and organized an uprising in Cusco choosing Gonzalo Pizarro, a rich encomendero in Charcas (currently Bolivia), as their leader. Gonzalo was the brother of Francisco, the leader of the Peru's conquistadors. The viceroy became very unpopular after attempting to suppress the rebellion by brute force. In the pursuit of order, the judges of the Real Audiencia decided to defend the encomenderos' position and set up a special court, which pronounced the removal of the viceroy by exiling him to Spain with the general consent of the local Spanish community. The judges also suspended the enforcement of the New Laws and ordered Gonzalo Pizarro to undo his army.

During the Viceroy's trial, Zárate, who had no direct intervention in the uprising, was called as a witness and stated he heard many people, both Spanish and indigenous, complain about the manner in which the representative of the crown governed. In order to safeguard his own image before the Spanish justice, Zárate signed a letter of protest in September 1544, stating that anything he did or would do in relation to the imprisonment and exile of the viceroy was caused by "just fear and dread”, motivated by the repression against those who were faithful to the king.

To notify the order to undo his army to Gonzalo Pizarro, who was based in Cusco, the Real Audiencia sent Zárate as one of the delegates «for being a servant of His Majesty and a man of good understanding». In his book Zárate tells that during his journey he was intercepted by a group Pizarro's soldiers who stopped him (leaving the other delegate continue) and took him in front of Gonzalo where Zárate did not dare to notify him of the order to disarm his troops in fear of being killed. Instead Zárate was charged with representing the demands of the rebels in front of the Real Audiencia in Lima. He went back to the capital and informed the Audiencia that the rebel demanded Gonzalo Pizarro to be named as governor otherwise his troops would attack and loot the city.

The Judges were doubtful about accepting this request, but on 20 October 1544, in front of the main local authorities, Zárate supported the appointment of Gonzalo as governor with the backing of all the Peruvian cities governors. Zárate handed over to Gonzalo the document that granted him the power of governor. In a confession made years later while imprisoned in Spain, Zárate justified this action by explaining that his relatives and friends had been taken as hostages.

Zárate tried to continue his accounting work, but even after naming his nephew Polo de Ondegardo as lawyer of the Royal Treasury and his secretary Antón Nieto as main assistant, he had difficulties in accomplishing his work due to the resistance of the royal officials interested in preventing him from completing the examination of the badly managed royal finances. Moreover, Gonzalo Pizarro used plenty of funds from the Royal Treasury to support his cause, insisting with Zárate that he be paid the expenses for pacifying the land. The fact that Pizarro offered Zárate servants from his encomienda in Chincha province may imply that Zárate possibly diverted royal funds to Pizarro needs. Unable to effectively carry out his task, Zárate chose to return to Spain. Before leaving he took to the convent of Santo Domingo the original papers of his accounting, leaving the keys to this chest in the possession of the members of the so called "intermediate side", i.e. the persons keeping a moderate position in between the Pizarro's rebels and the king's loyalists.

=== Return to Spain ===
Zárate left the port of Callao on 9 July 1545, about one year after his arrival, leaving in the viceroyalty his nephews Polo de Ondegardo and Diego de Zárate as well as his main assistant Anton Nieto, provisionally invested with the office of accountant of the Royal Treasury of Lima. He was carrying with him a small amount of money (just 3000 pesos) he had collected for the Royal Treasury in Spain.

He arrived in Panama on 4 August 1545 where the uprising in favor of the former Viceroy Núñez Vela was still going on, supported by the local governor. Being requested to provide money in support of the uprising, he flew away during the night and reached Nombre de Dios on the Atlantic coast of the region. There he prepared a number of documents to protect himself from possible prosecution for opposing the governor: a letter and a complete report for the king and statements from witnesses about his behavior. In the report he explained the reasons why he had decided to return to Spain without finishing his task of fiscal auditor and summarized his audit work. This report may be regarded as a prelude to his book which includes the justification of many of his actions.

At the end of August he embarked on two ships the valuables he had collected for the crown, completed his auditing work in the Tierra Firme province and finally left South America on 9 November 1545. Following a strong storm, the ship carrying him was wrecked in the Caribbean Sea and Zárate extended his journey to Mexico City where the local fiscal auditor asked him to bring to Spain the money he had collected as the outcome of his own financial audits. Zárate landed in Spain in July 1546.

Meanwhile, the complaints of his enemies had reached the Spanish Court and Zárate was summoned before the judges and sent to prison under the accusation of fraud against the state for administrative offenses and of having supported the rebel administration of Gonzalo Pizarro. He presented himself as a spokesman for the Peruvian "intermediate side" and he produced a report to support his conviction that the most appropriate means to achieve the pacification of Peru would be to appoint as governor Hernando Pizarro, step brother of Francisco and Gonzalo, instead of the hated viceroy and the impetuous Gonzalo. He was released after ten months of prison thanks to the bail collected by his friends. During this time, Zárate had time to collect his notes and start drafting his Historia del descubrimiento y conquista del Perú (History of discovery and conquest of Peru).

With the defeat of the uprising in Peru and Pizarro's execution in 1548, a trial was opened against all of his supporters and thus a criminal file was opened against Zárate, requesting him to be sentenced to death for having taken part in the capture of the viceroy. After being imprisoned again for three months, he was held in confinement at home. The ruling at the criminal trial was of acquittal of all charges while the civil trial ruled Zárate to pay the sum of 382 pesos for fraud against the State.

In 1554 Prince Regent Philip gathered an army at A Coruña which would accompany him to marry the English Queen Mary I (known as Bloody Mary among her Protestant opponents). To this end, he tasked Zárarte with the collection of all the gold and silver from the last fleet of the Indies, together with another sum collected through an extraordinary quota to be paid by merchants and other private people. Zárate collected about 250 million maravedis in less than two months and brought them to the prince.

Zárate's Historia was ready by that time. He gave the manuscript to the Prince, who read it during the week-long journey to Southampton and seemingly liked the story so much that he decided to ask Zárate to publish it. Zárate was then sent to Antwerp to collect taxes in the Flanders and start minting coins locally with silver coming from America.

On 30 March 1555 Zárate stamped his signature on the dedicatory letter of his book whose first edition was printed at the Martinus Nutius (Martín Nucio in Spanish) printing house in Antwerp. From then on the chronicle began its extensive dissemination, supported by numerous reprints and translations into various languages.

After completing his assignment in the Flanders, Zárate returned to Spain where, in October 1555, he was assigned the task to make inquiries about the extraction of silver in the mines of Guadalcanal in Andalusia. Later he was assigned as accountant in the Office of the Treasury until the end of 1572, when having reached 60 he returned to Andalusia. Here, in 1574, a royal dispatch granted Zárate the appointment of administrator of the inland salt flats of Andalusia, with a salary of 200,000 maravedis a year.

Zárate dedicated himself to making further modifications to the text of his chronicle. He reformulated the narration of decisive episodes such as the murder of Francisco Pizarro or the capture of the viceroy and particularly he eliminated some chapters referring to idolatry of Native Americans.

Through a license from the King to reprint his work he commissioned the second edition of the History in Spanish, which appeared in Seville in 1577. The text of this second edition is the one that has been commonly used up to present days.

In his last years of life Zárate worked as accountant of the Casa de Contratación de las Indias. He was accused of a fraud of 26,000 ducats at the salt pans of Andalusia. The latest document known about Zárate is a report of 1585 containing his position in discharge of his financial management of the Andalusian salt flats.

Zárate was probably married a second time to Isabel Sotelo de Ribera. Nothing is known about his descendants, except a letter from his nephew Polo de Ondegardo, written in Potosí in 1550, which institutes an income for the endowment of Isabelica, Zárate's daughter.

Zárate died probably after 1589 but the exact date is not known.

== Works ==
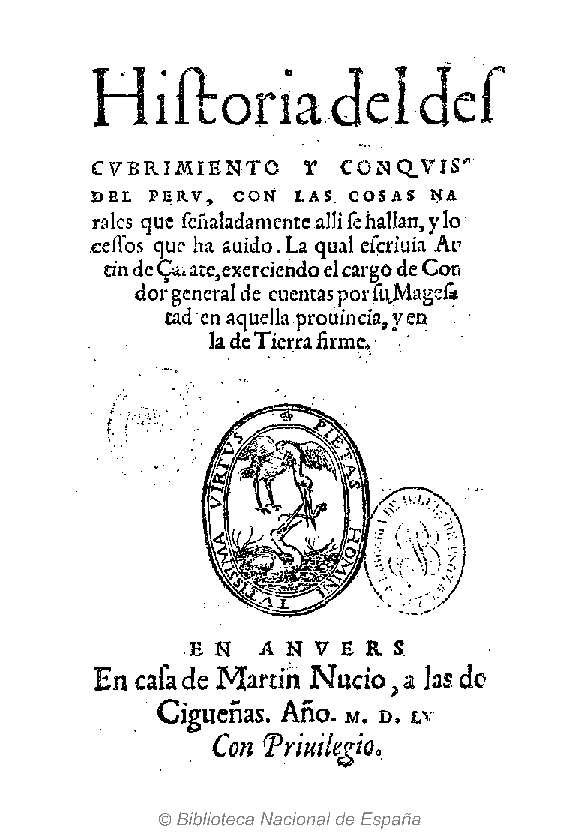
Cover of the first edition, 1555

His only known work is Historia del descubrimiento y conquista del Perú (History of discovery and conquest of Peru). This chronicle makes him one of the main Spanish historians and chroniclers of Peru. It was a valuable source for Francisco López de Gómara, a 16th-century Spanish historian, and for Inca Garcilaso de la Vega, the first mestizo chronicler, who cites Zárate in his Comentarios Reales de los Incas.

Lydia Fossa, scholar of American colonial literature, regards the Historia as an example of a 16th-century best seller since it was published multiple times: in Spanish in 1555 and 1577 (second edition, modified); in German, French and Italian in 1563, in English in 1581.

Thanks to his classical education and despite spending only one year in Peru, Zárate was able to witness the local life and collected information and manuscripts, parts of which he copied into his book. When he returned to Spain he brought with him good memories of the American affairs and, having experienced the uprising of the encomenderos against the monarchy, he wrote: “I saw so many rebellions and news in that land, that it seemed something worth of memory”. The work was conceived by Zárate during his ten month imprisonment after his return to Spain from South America. It is composed of seven books: the first four recount the period from Francisco Pizarro's preparations for the exploration of the region to the arrival of Zárate, while the last three detail what happened in Peru from 1544 to 1550 and are written (especially the fifth, whose events the author witnessed) with great realism and dramatic intensity.

Zárate's work has been valued by the Spanish historians and critics.

Enrique De Vedia, one of the editors of Zárate work, affirmed in 1858 that it is “one of the most beautiful historical monuments (perhaps the first) of our [Spanish] language”.

According to the Real Biblioteca (Royal Library) the Historia has always been praised as a work of recognized literary quality, reprinted in Venice in 1563 and in Seville in 1577 and also translated into English, French, Italian and even German, proof of its worth.

For Raimundo Lazo, Spanish literary historian, Zárate constitutes a case “whose singularity imposes its clear differentiation from the group of chroniclers of colonial Peru”.

For Fernandez and Tamaro, Zárate "was a methodical writer and good stylist; although his book was not very original it enjoyed high prestige and was translated into Italian, English, French and German. He shows a remarkable mastery of the literary trade; he wrote with method and clarity, with great grace of language and style".

Zárate in his Historia makes frequent references to the classical world of Ancient Greece and Ancient Rome, with which he occasionally compares the Inca Empire and the social environment of the conquest. Almost all the citations refer to classical authors such as Horace, Seneca, Ovid and the "divine" Platon, whom Zárate follows in the myth of Atlantis to explain the origin of the primitive settlers of the American continent; he also quotes the Neoplatonic philosopher Marsilio Ficino.

Even the contemporary Spanish conquistador and chronicler of Peru Pedro Cieza de León observes that "this Agustín de Zárate is considered "wise and read" in the Latin letters".

=== Sources of the Historia ===
Zárate based his work on several reports, although he mainly follows two of them: the first one is a manuscript that belonged to Viceory Pedro de La Gasca that recounts the uprising of Gonzalo Pizarro, while the second one is the report of Rodrigo Lozano, mayor of Trujillo, which Zárate mentions at the beginning of his book; Lozano's manuscript was used for the initial chapters about the discovery of Peru.

Zárate never specified in his book how long he was a direct witness to Peruvian affairs. He indeed stayed in Peru for about one year, and this is the main reason why he had to use other chronicles. He must have also used the letters and reports received form his nephew Polo de Ondegardo, who remained in Peru, but it is nevertheless difficult to understand how Zárate could study in a single year the subject of the Incas' religion, which he includes in his first edition.

=== The new edition of 1577 ===
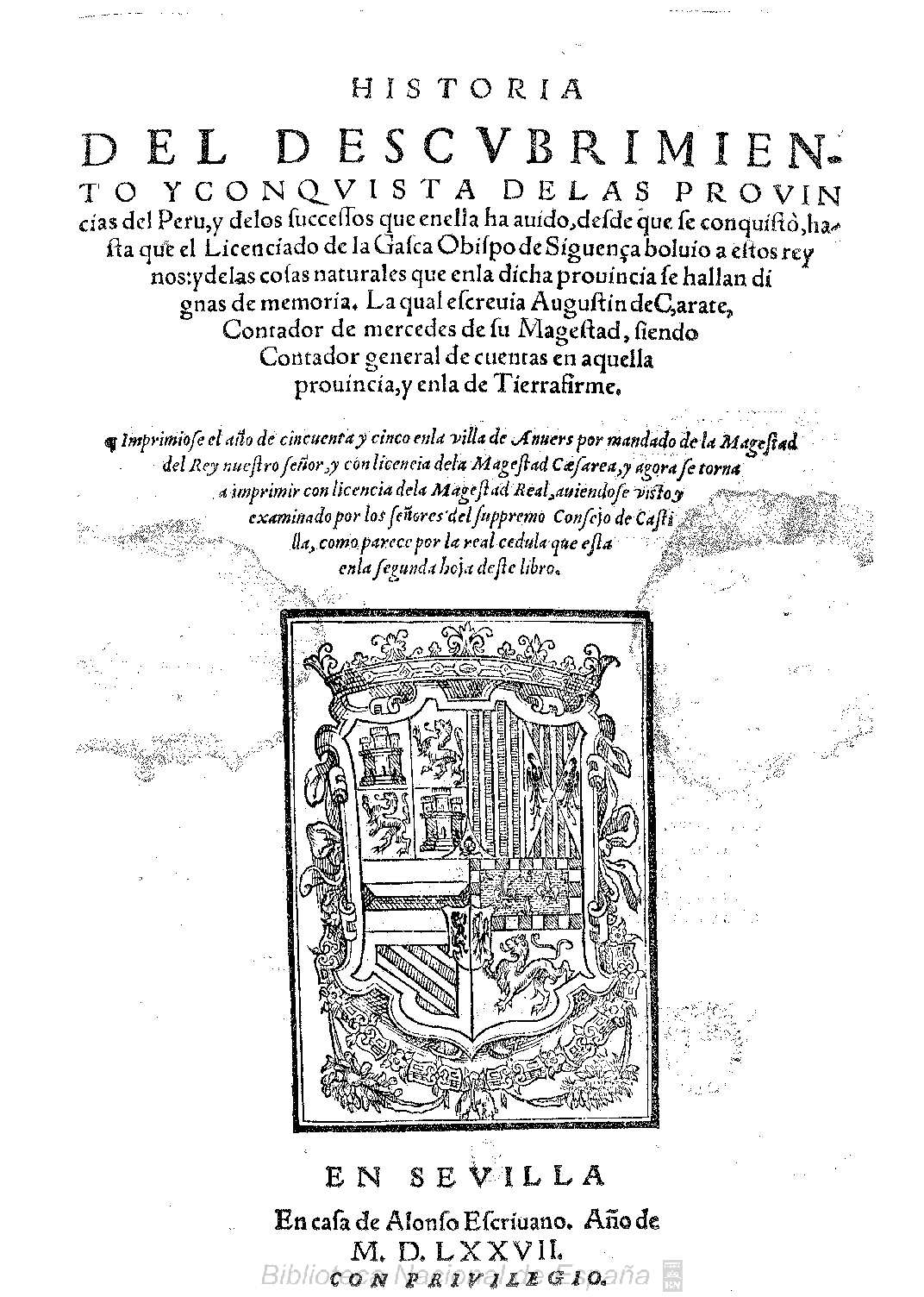
Cover of the 1577 edition

In 1577 the book was reprinted in Spanish with significant modifications. Zárate removed three chapters of the first book about the Andean religion (which was known at the time as "idolatry"). He also wished everyone to forget his intervention in the rebellion of Gonzalo Pizarro, so chapters 12 and 26 of the fifth book were partly rewritten to eliminate all indications about his past complications and his sympathies or antipathies. This new edition was made in the same format as the original one by the Sevillian printer Alonso Escribano.

The main reason for the changes might have been a modified attitude by Spanish government. When Zárate’s manuscript was first presented to Philip, he was a young prince, not yet the king of Spain. By 1563 Philip, after reigning for seven years had determined that the Inquisition was to be made stronger because the cause of God and the cause of the Spanish monarchy were to be fully interlinked. Any negative comments about anyone representing the royal authority could become an offense. Censorship had become more active between the first edition and the succeeding ones. A law published in 1558 increased control on all printed material and manuscripts and introduced the death penalty and confiscation of all wealth for those who retained or sold books condemned by the Inquisition. New editions of already published items were subject to the same restrictions. This led to a new official doctrine in which the Christianization preferred to ignore rather than acquire any knowledge of the religious past of the Native Americans. This doctrine certainly implied a general application also in Spain and it is in this context that Zárate suppressed the three chapters of his Historia concerning religion and myths from pre-Hispanic Peru.

Of these removed chapters, chapter 10 evokes, along with the cosmogony legends of the Andean Natives, their traditions referring to a flood that Zárate compares with the Genesis flood narrative of the Bible. Chapter 11 gives details on the offerings and sacrifices to the huacas (Andean shrines), called idols by the Spaniards. It constitutes a significant testimony of the human sacrifices in Peru. Moreover, this chapter reports that the Andean Natives used to compare the miter worn by Christian bishops to a similar headwear found on pre-Incan statues (perhaps dating back to the time of the Tiahuanaco culture). This led many of the Spaniards to believe that these statues represented the Christian apostles during a presumed first preaching of the gospel in America shortly after the death of Jesus. Finally chapter 12 attributes to the Andean Natives the belief in the resurrection of the flesh, a testimony to which Inca Garcilaso de la Vega was to attach the greatest importance.

== See also ==
- Pedro Cieza de León – Spanish conquistador and chronicler of Peru
