= Objektif =

Turkish rock band

- Origin: Samsun, Turkey
- Genres: Hard rock; heavy metal
- Years active: 1988–1996, 1998–2000, 2004–present
- Labels: Ada Müzik; Ağdaş Müzik; TMC; Uzelli Müzik
- Members: Vecdi Yücalan; Onur Akça; Murat Tükenmez; Çağlar Abanoz; Umut Mutku
- Past members: Tayfun Çubukçu; Tuncay Zigaloğlu; İbrahim Cantay; Mahmut Asan; Ferruh Bonabian; Süha Duran; Cankut Bayhan; Faruk Kavi; Umut Arabacı; Alişan Topaloğlu; Hakan Şavklı; Başat Karakaş; Taner Keser; Gökçe Dayanç; Volkan Uzunhasanoğulları; Bülent Güven; Alpay Şalt; Toygar Işıklı

Objektif is a Turkish hard rock and heavy metal band from Samsun. It was formed in 1988 and currently consists of Vecdi Yücalan (vocals and guitar), Murat Tükenmez (bass), Çağlar Abanoz (guitar), Umut Mutku (guitar), and Onur Akça (drums). The band's first studio album, Tımarlı Hastane, was released in 1990. Their other studio albums are Hayal ve Yaşam (1993), Kuşkular (1996), Künye (2000), and Sokağın Sesi (2007).

== History ==
The band was formed by Vecdi Yücalan in 1988 in Samsun, to participate the next year's Altın Çınar Music Contest. At that time, the band was consisting İbrahim Cantay (vocals), Vecdi Yücalan (guitar), Tayfun Çubukçu (bass), and Tuncay Zigaloğlu (drums). In Altın Çınar Music Contest, Objektif gained the fourth place in overall competition, and the first place in rock competition. In 1990, Uzelli Müzik released their first studio album, Tımarlı Hastane, and in 1993, the second, Hayal ve Yaşam. Mahmut Asan (keyboard) joined to the band in the second album.

Kuşkular, their third studio album, was released by Ada Müzik in 1996. In the album, Ferruh Bonabian (bass), Alpay Şalt (drums) and Süha Duran (keyboard) were added to the band. After the album, Objektif was disestablished and remained inactive until 1998, when it was reestablished in Istanbul. In their fourth studio album, Künye (2000), which was released by TMC, Vecdi Yücalan appeared also with his vocals. The other members of the band were Cankut Bayhan (guitar), Faruk Kavi (guitar), Umut Arabacı (bass), and Alişan Topaloğlu (drums). After the release of this album, they were disestablished again, but reestablished in 2004 with the new members. The group performed in Barışarock events of 2004 and 2005.

In 2007, Ağdaş Müzik released their fifth studio album, Sokağın Sesi. Hakan Şavklı (guitar), Başat Karakaş (bass), Taner Keser (drums), Gökçe Dayanç (drums), Volkan Uzunhasanoğulları (keyboard), Bülent Güven (keyboard), and Toygar Işıklı (keyboard) appeared in Sokağın Sesi. Objektif is currently working on its sixth studio album which will be released as Halkın Sesi.

== Style ==
The band performs hard rock and heavy metal songs, and some of their songs are examples of protest music with their environmentalist and political themes. Vecdi Yücalan, the founder of the band stated that he was influenced by Elvis Presley, John Lennon, The Beatles, Black Sabbath, Cem Karaca, and Erkin Koray. He also described the band's style of music as "people's rock".

== Members ==
Current

- Vecdi Yücalan (vocals and guitar)
- Murat Tükenmez (bass)
- Çağlar Abanoz (guitar)
- Umut Mutku (guitar)
- Onur Akça (drums)

Former

- İbrahim Cantay (vocals)
- Cankut Bayhan (guitar)
- Faruk Kavi (guitar)
- Hakan Şavklı (guitar)
- Umut Arabacı (bass)
- Başat Karakaş (bass)
- Tayfun Çubukçu (bass)
- Ferruh Bonabian (bass)
- Tuncay Zigaloğlu (drums)
- Alişan Topaloğlu (drums)
- Alpay Şalt (drums)
- Taner Keser (drums)
- Gökçe Dayanç (drums)
- Mahmut Asan (keyboard)
- Süha Duran (keyboard)
- Volkan Uzunhasanoğulları (keyboard)
- Bülent Güven (keyboard)
- Toygar Işıklı (keyboard)

== Discography ==
- Tımarlı Hastane (1990, Uzelli Müzik)
- Hayal ve Yaşam (1993, Uzelli Müzik)
- Kuşkular (1996, Ada Müzik)
- Künye (2000, TMC)
- Sokağın Sesi (2007, Ağdaş Müzik)
- Halkın Sesi (TBA)
