= Yavuz Çetin =

Turkish musician (1970–2001)

- Born: Yavuz Hilmi Çetin; September 25, 1970; Samsun, Turkey
- Died: August 15, 2001 (aged 30) Istanbul, Turkey
- Genres: Rock, blues, blues rock, psychedelic rock, hard rock
- Instruments: Guitar, vocals, wah pedal, talk box
- Years active: 1985–2001

Yavuz Hilmi Çetin (25 September 1970 – 15 August 2001) was a Turkish musician, singer, and songwriter in the blues and psychedelic music genres. He gained renown in his native country for the skill and sensitivity of his guitar performances. Following his suicide at the age of 30, before the release of his highly praised album, Satılık [For Sale], Çetin achieved a near-iconic posthumous status as a talent lost on the brink of great achievement. Also, he is one of the most known Anatolian blues singers.

== Musical training ==
Born in the Black Sea port of Samsun, Turkey's 15th largest city and capital of Samsun Province, Yavuz Çetin spent his early school years traveling through the country's various regions, as his father, journalist Erdal Çetin, responded to the demands inherent in the profession. In 1984, at the age of 14, the adolescent music enthusiast was already taking blues and rock guitar lessons from guitarist Ahmet Kanneci and, the following year, started learning to master the acoustic guitar and, subsequently, the electric guitar. Before graduating from Istanbul's Haydarpaşa High School, he and classmate Ercan Saatçi who, in later years, became a noted musician as well as sports journalist, entered HEY magazine's music competition and their song, "I Will Cry", became the winning entry.

In 1988, continuing his quest in Istanbul for higher education and advanced musical training, Çetin began studies at Marmara University's Music Department while earning an income as a musical performer in clubs such as Beyaz Ev [White House] in the port town of Bodrum, where he played in 1989–90. In 1991, upon turning 21, he formed, with young musical colleagues Batu Mutlugil, Kerim Çaplı (Kim Capli) and Sunay Özgür, the musical group, Blue Blues Band. Having married in 1992, Yavuz Çetin and wife Didem filed for divorce four years later. In that year, 1996, and for the remaining four years of his life, he was also a guitarist at the numerous concerts played by the noted band Mazhar-Fuat-Özkan.

He collaborated, as well, on various albums with artists such as Teoman, Kıraç, Sibel Tüzün, Soner Arıca, Göksel, Deniz Arcak and Acil Servis. In Göksel's hit song "Sabır", he became the first Turkish guitar player to use a talk box. Of particular note is his solo on Deniz Arcak's "Bırakın Beni" from the Kıpır Kıpır album which, in an illustration of his mastery of the rock and blues guitar tradition, was recorded on the first take after only a couple of rehearsals. It also became the last studio session recording in which he participated.

== Two albums, İlk and Satılık ==
In 1997, Yavuz Çetin issued his first album İlk, produced by his longtime compatriot Ercan Saatçi, but the album was unable to capture the spirit of that moment's public musical mood. He also earned an income from writing numerous advertising jingles, such as a well-remembered Coca-Cola spot, and his tune "Dünya" ["the World"], which was chosen as part of the soundtrack for the 1999 film, "Propaganda", with a score composed and arranged by master guitarist Erkan Oğur.

At age 30, after writing all the tracks for his second album, Satılık, and having completed the album's final recording session, Çetin died by suicide after jumping from the Boğaziçi Bridge in Istanbul. Posthumous acclaim followed the subsequent release of the album which was described by music reviewers as a work of genius. Since Çetin's death, the albums Satılık and İlk ve Son... have gained a near-cult status as Çetin's music continued to be distributed.

== Discography ==
İlk (Stop Productions) (1997)

1. Erkeğin Olmak İstiyorum (I want to be your man)
2. Bilmem Neden İnat Ettim (I don't know why I persisted)
3. Sahil (Coast)
4. Bodrum Gecesi Yüzünden (Because of the Bodrum Night)
5. Kimse Bilemez (Nobody can know)
6. Gecenin Rengi (Colour of the Night)
7. Ağlamayı Sevmem (I don't like crying)
8. Çok İstiyorum (I want it so badly)
9. Onun Şarkısı (Her Song)
10. Hisset Beni (Feel Me)
11. Fanki Tonki Zonki (Instrumental)
12. Dünya (The World)

Satılık (TMC Müzik) (2001)

1. Cherokee
2. Benimle Uçmak İster misin? (Would you like to fly with me?)
3. Oyuncak Dünya (Toy World)
4. Bul Beni (Find Me)
5. Sadece Senin Olmak (To be only yours)
6. Yaşamak İstemem (I don't want to live)
7. Kurtar Beni (Save Me)
8. Köle (Slave)
9. İstanbul'a Ait (It belongs to Istanbul)
10. Herşey Biter (Everything ends)

25 Eylül (Groovie Studio London) (2025)

1. Oyuncak Dünya (Acoustic Version)
2. Hatırlamıyorum (Acoustic Version)
3. Göklerin Altında (Acoustic Version)
4. Gerçek Aşk (Acoustic Version)
5. Sevgimi Ver (Acoustic Version)
6. Sevgimi Ver - Smokey (Acoustic Version)
7. İstanbul'a Ait (Acoustic Version)
8. Funky (Bonus Track)
9. Anka (Bonus Track)
10. Hiç Düşünmezsin (Bonus Track)
