= Altın Gün =

Dutch Anatolian rock band

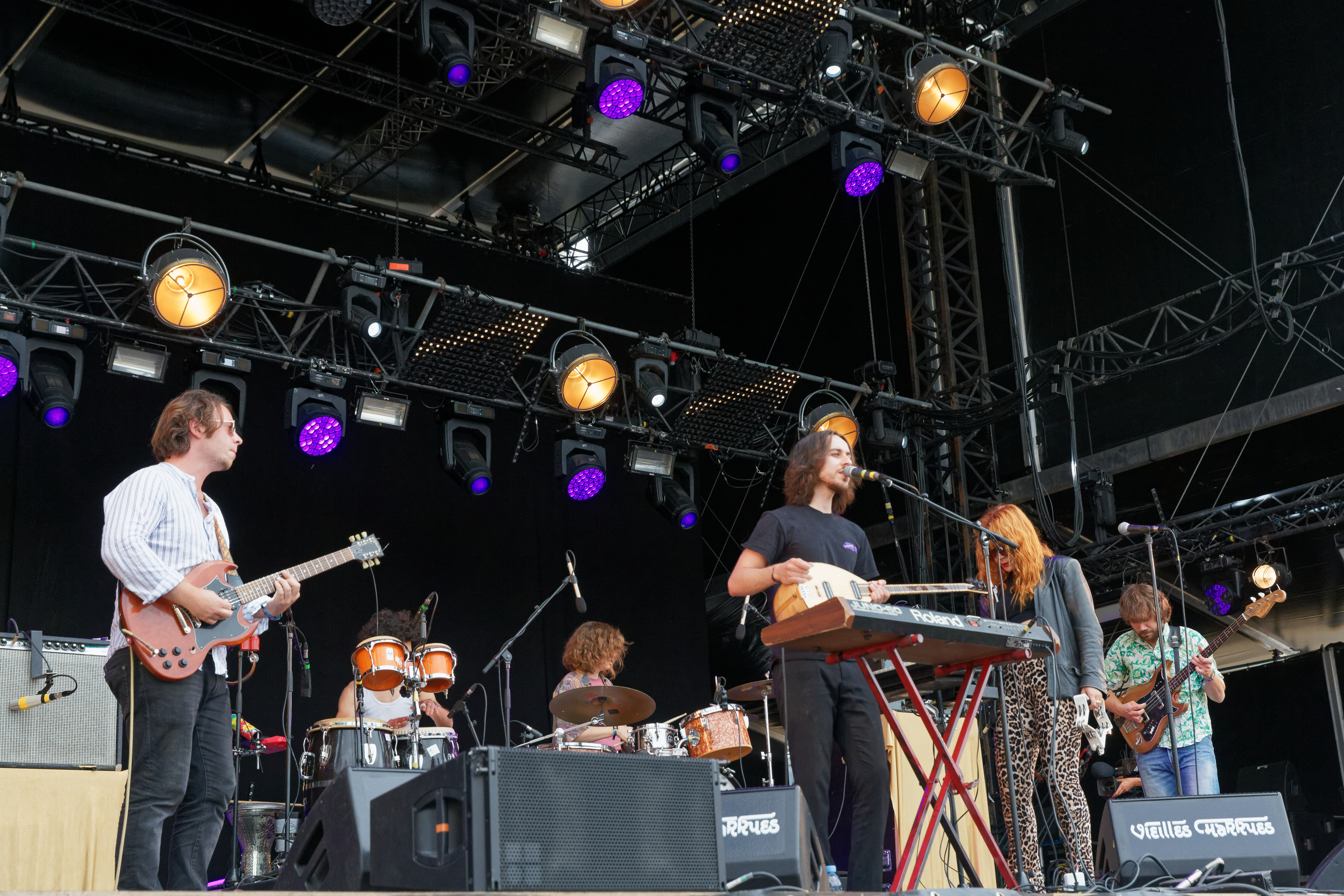
- Altın Gün performing in 2018

Background information
- Origin: Amsterdam, Netherlands
- Genres: Anatolian rock; Turkish folk; psychedelic rock; synth-pop
- Years active: 2016–present
- Labels: Bongo Joe; ATO Records; Glitterbeat
- Members: Jasper Verhulst; Erdinç Ecevit Yıldız; Daniel Smienk; Chris Bruining; Thijs Elzinga
- Past members: Merve Daşdemir; Gino Groeneveld; Nic Mauskoviç; Ben Rider
- Website: https://altingunband.com/

Altın Gün (lit. 'Golden Day' in Turkish) is a Dutch psychedelic rock band from Amsterdam, formed in 2016. Founded by bassist Jasper Verhulst, the band's vocalist Erdinç Ecevit Yıldız is of Turkish ethnicity while the other four members are Dutch.

The band's Turkish psychedelic rock, also known as Anatolian rock, contains a "dirty blend of funk rhythms, wah-wah guitars and analogue organs". Altın Gün also performs psychedelic rock covers of Turkish folk music.

== History ==
Jasper Verhulst's passion for Turkish folk music grew after he visited Istanbul on tour. He posted advertisements on Facebook and in Amsterdam seeking musicians who could speak Turkish and play Turkish instruments, to cover famous Turkish folk songs from the 1970s.

The band was signed to ATO Records after a performance at King Gizzard & the Lizard Wizard's Gizzfest 2018.

Their debut album was On, released in 2018. In 2019, they released Gece which was nominated for the 62nd Annual Grammy Awards (2019) in the Best World Music Album category. The band's first American tour commenced in mid 2019. In 2021, they released Yol which introduced synth-pop elements in combination with their traditional sound. The same year, they released Âlem, which continued to "push deeper into electronic pop". The album was released exclusively on Bandcamp with proceeds benefiting environmental non-profit Earth Today. Their following album Aşk released on 31 March 2023.

The band was also featured in the soundtrack of the video game Star Wars Jedi: Survivor (2023). They released three tracks under the name of "Altin Lazer Blaster".

In June 2023, they released the soundtrack for the Apple TV ad Büyük Kaçış (The Great Escape) filmed around the Grand Bazaar in Istanbul.

In February 2024, the band announced on their social media pages that the female vocalist Merve Daşdemir has decided to quit the band and start a new musical chapter after her 8-year-long career as one of the two vocalists. In 2026, the reformed group without Merve Daşdemir released their latest album, Garip, which consisted of exclusively covers of songs by the Turkish folk musician Neşet Ertaş, although with wildly different arrangements to the original songs.

== Members ==
=== Current ===
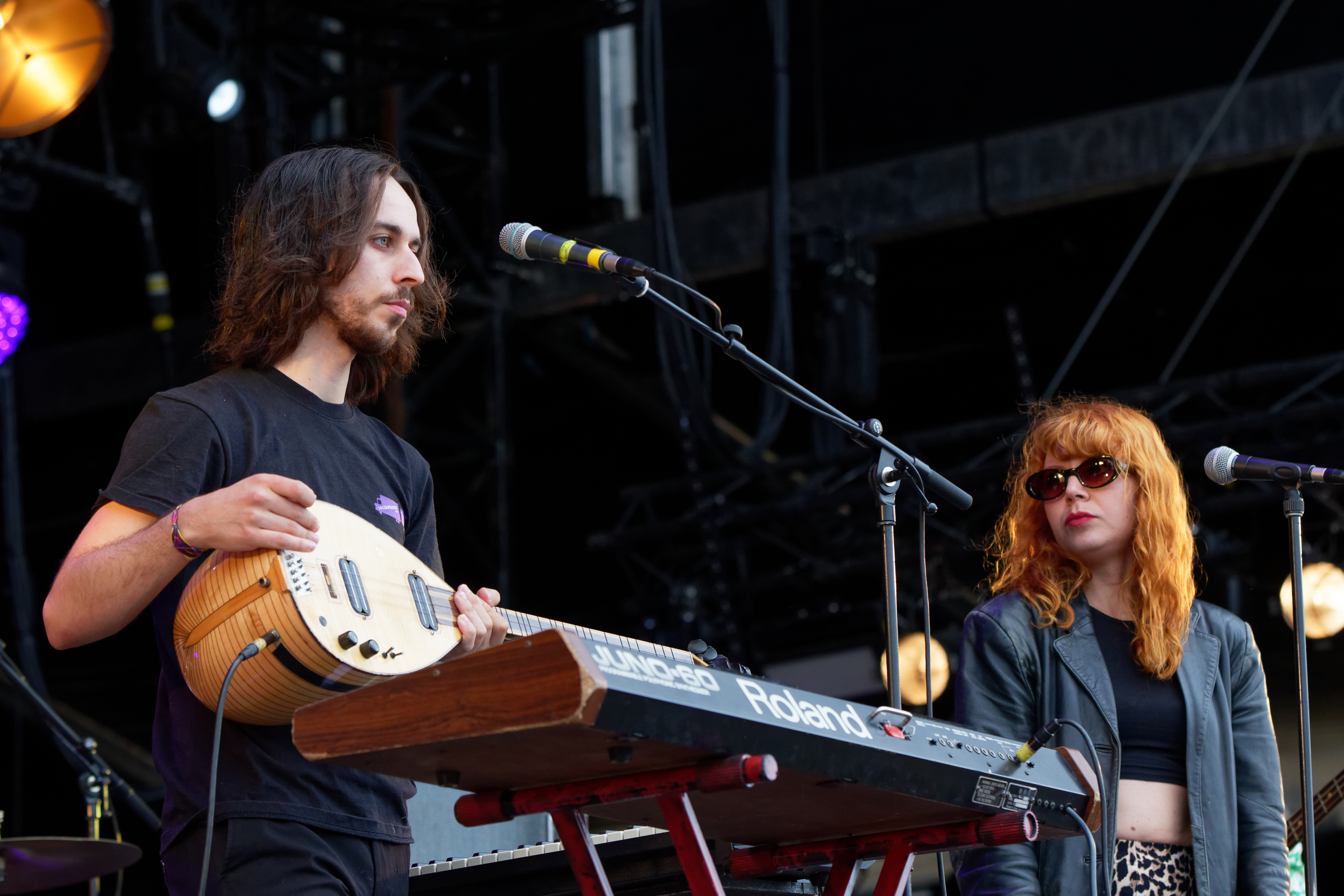
Vocalists of the band, Erdinç Ecevit Yıldız and Merve Daşdemir.

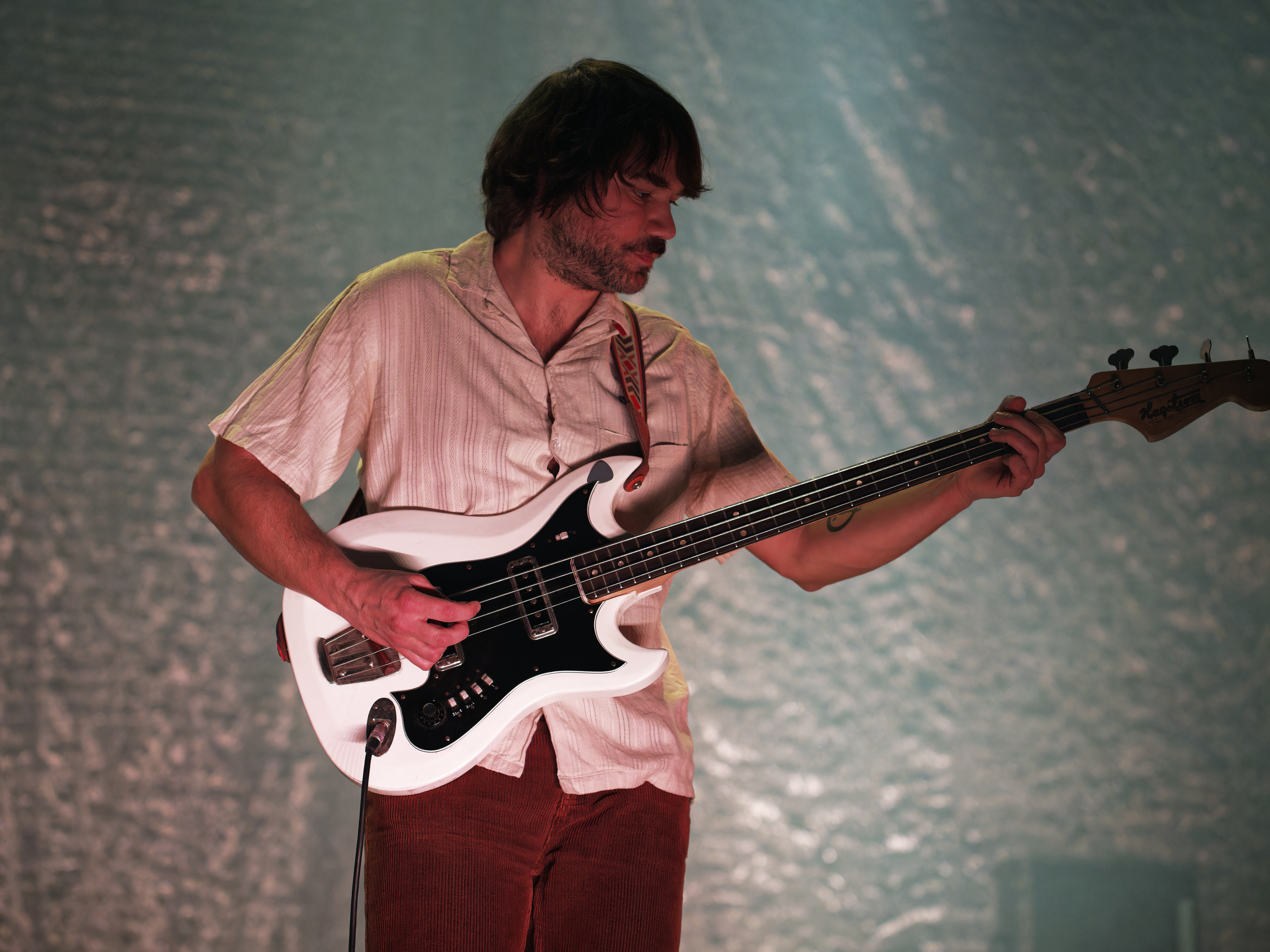
Jasper Verhulst

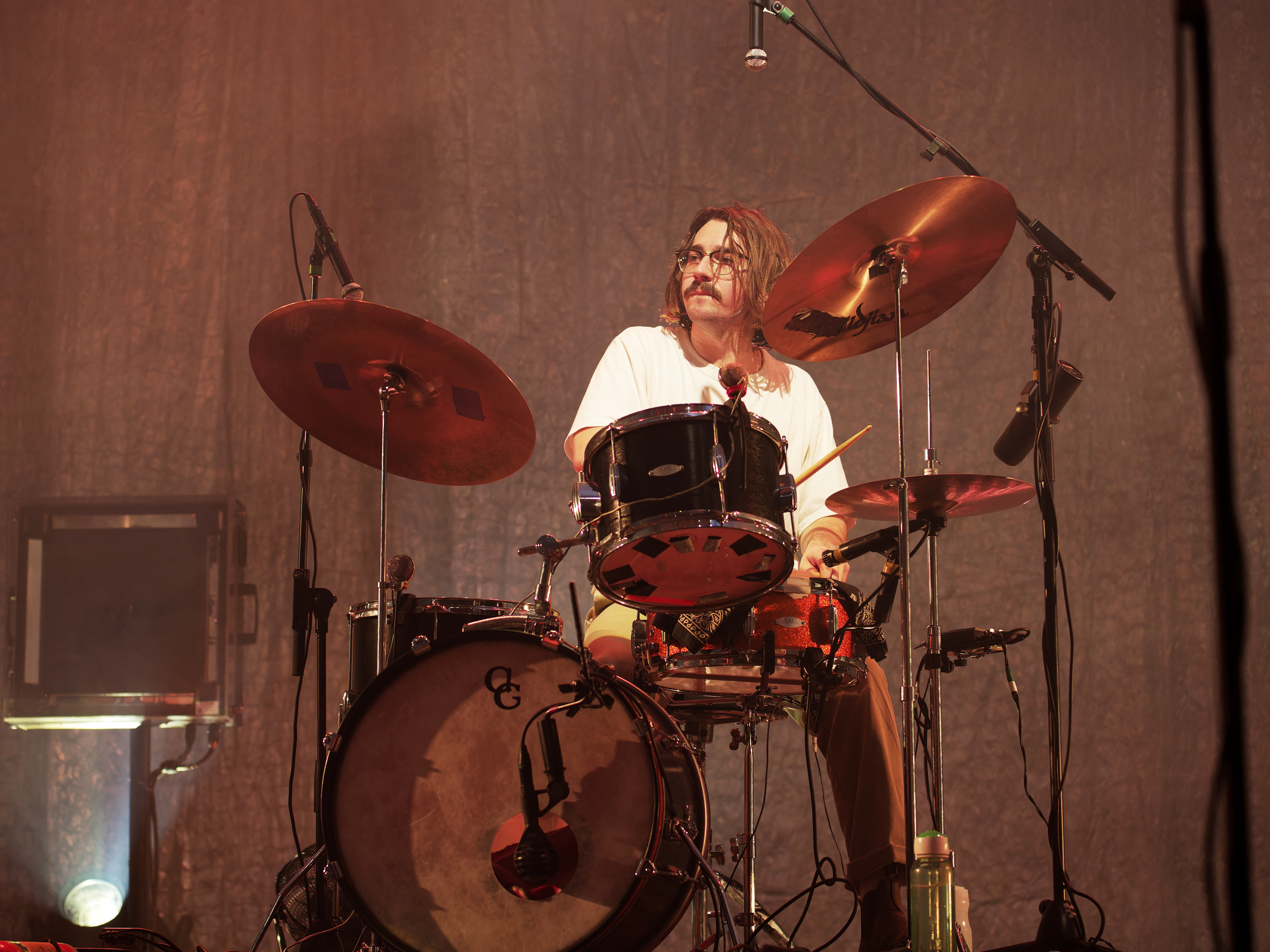
Daniel Smienk

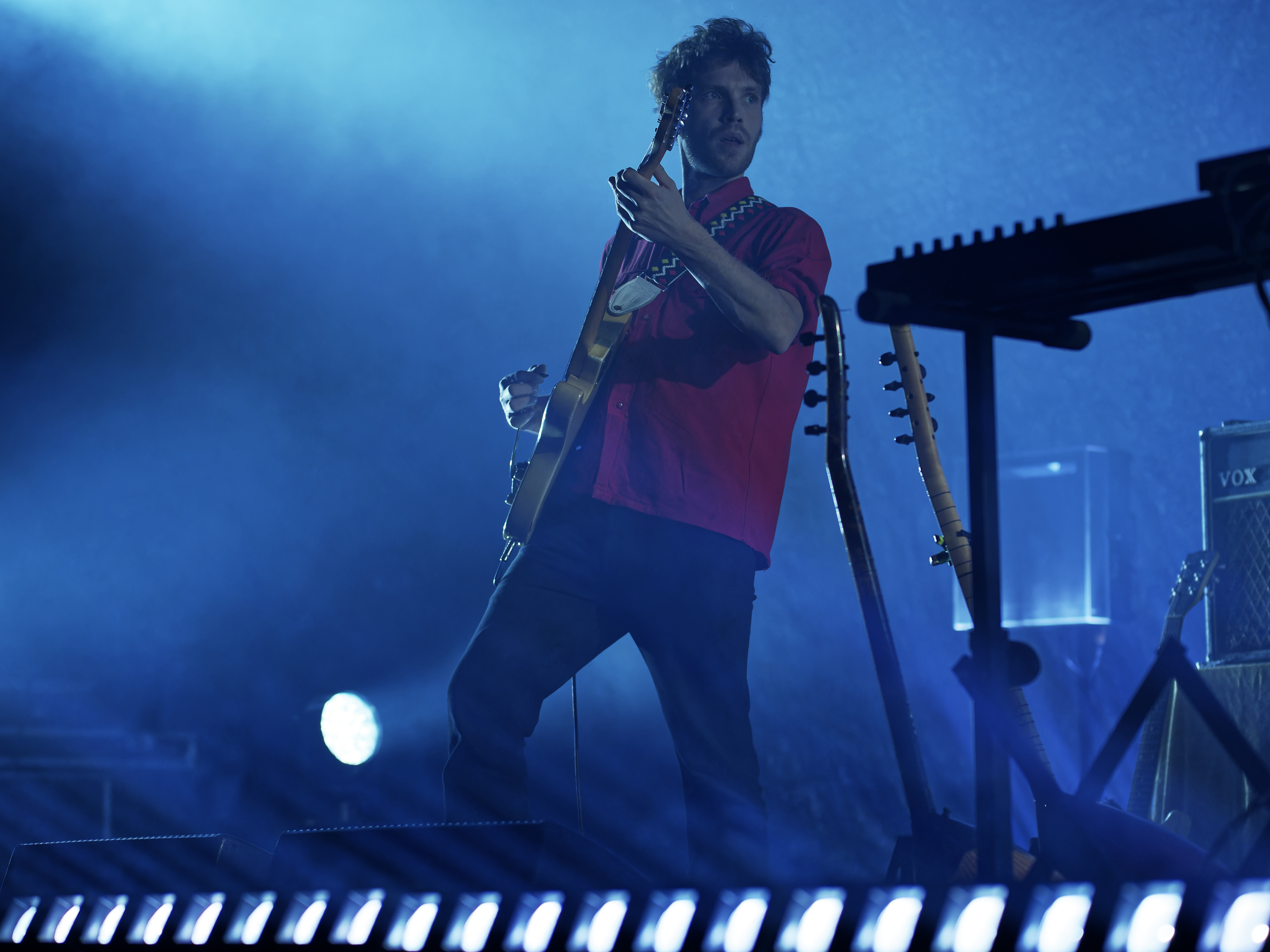
Thijs Elzinga

- Jasper Verhulst – bass
- Erdinç Ecevit Yıldız – vocals, bağlama, keys
- Daniel Smienk – drums
- Chris Bruining – percussion
- Thijs Elzinga – guitar

=== Former ===
- Merve Daşdemir – vocals, keys, small percussion (2016–2024)
- Gino Groeneveld – percussion
- Ben Rider – guitar
- Nic Mauskoviç – drums

== Discography ==
=== Albums ===
- On (2018)
- Gece (2019)
- Yol (2021)
- Âlem (2021)
- Aşk (2023)
- Garip (2026)

=== Singles ===
- "Goca Dünya" / "Kırşehirin Gülleri" (2017)
- "Tatlı Dile Güler Yüze" (2018)
- "Hababam" (2018)
- "Vay Dünya" (2018)
- "Süpürgesi Yoncadan" / "Vay Vay" (2019)
- "Gelin Halayı" / "Dıv Dıv" (2019)
- "Ordunun Dereleri" / "Bir Of Çeksem" (2020)
- "Yüce Dağ Başında" (2021)
- "Kara Toprak" (2021)
- "Kısasa Kısas" / "Erkilet Güzeli" (2021)
- "Badi Sabah Olmadan" / "Cips Kola Kilit" (2022)
- "Leylim Ley" (2022)
- "Rakıya Su Katamam" (2023)
- "Güzelliğin On Para Etmez" (2023)
- "Su Sızıyor" (2023)
- "Doktor Civanım" (2023)
- "Kalk Gidelim (Remix) / Su Sızıyor (Remix)" (2023)
- "Vallahi Yok / Kırık Cam" (2024)
- "Neredesin Sen" (2026)
