= Asım Can Gündüz =

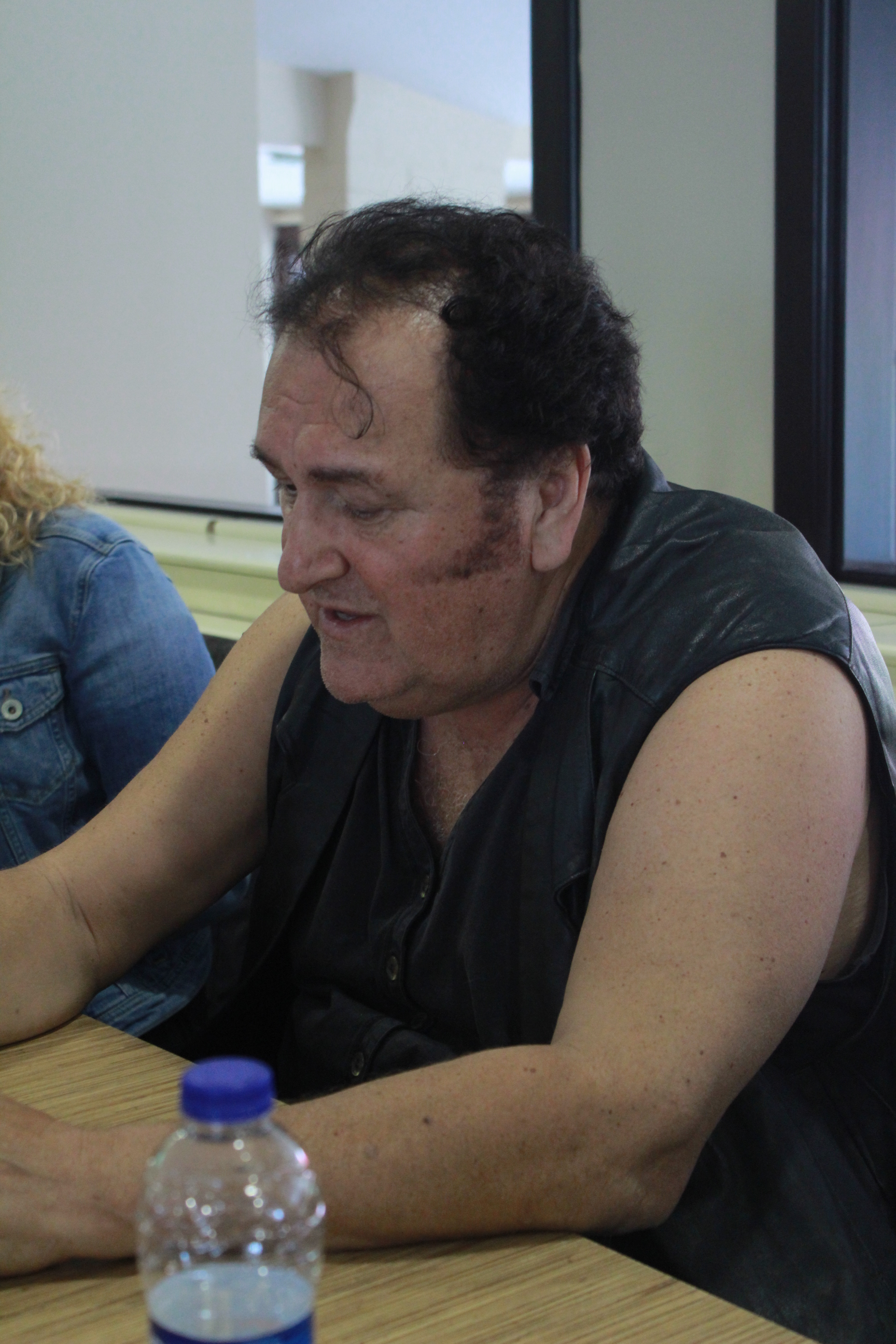
- Gündüz during a talk in Bilkent University. (April 2016)
- Born: August 15, 1955
- Died: June 24, 2016 (aged 60); İçmeler, Marmaris
- Citizenship: Turkey
- Occupation: Guitarist

Asım Can Gündüz (August 15, 1955 – June 24, 2016) was a Turkish rock and blues guitarist. He was also known as Awesome John, especially outside Turkey, partly because his name is pronounced very much like Awesome (Asım) John (Can).

== Career ==
Gündüz lived in New York City until the early 1980s as John Gundez. There, he formed "Zacharia", a three-piece rock band playing his original material consisted of guitarist Harry Zaverdas who played bass, and various drummers during its existence.

John Gundez auditioned and was selected along with Harry Zaverdas to portray/perform as Jimi Hendrix, on drums was Robert Gottfried http://robthedrummer.com/. They sold out four nights in New York City at The Bottom Line night club "Jimi and Janis Together Again" show which toured as far as Chicago's largest indoor amusement park.

His career in the United States was cut short after family obligations forced him to return to Turkey at the height of his United States career. In Turkey, he formed rock bands including Ambulans, Delikanlı, Affetmez, Çapkınlar, Hard Rakı. He finished the sessions for his first album Anasının Gözü Cin Gibi in 1989, released three years later in 1992. Gündüz released his second album Bir Sevgi Eseri / "A Work Of Love" which consisted of Turkish language versions of blues singles in 1998.

After 2000, Gündüz resumed touring and performing outside of Turkey.

== Death ==
Gündüz died of a heart attack on June 24, 2016 at his home in İçmeler, Marmaris.

== See also ==
- List of Turkish musicians
- Anatolian blues
