= Ajlan Büyükburç =

Turkish musical artist

- Born: 13 November 1970; Istanbul, Turkey
- Died: 22 July 1999 (aged 28) Muğla, Turkey
- Genres: Pop, jazz
- Occupation: Singer
- Instruments: Guitar
- Years active: 1987–1999

Ajlan Büyükburç (13 November 1970 – 22 July 1999) was a Turkish singer.

== Life ==
Ajlan Büyükburç was born in 1970 to Erol Büyükburç and Türkan Türker. Her parents later had a younger daughter named Jeyan. At the age of eight, Büyükburç started learning guitar from her father. Having an archive of her father's three thousand records, Büyükburç had said that she started playing jazz music thanks to him. At the age of 17, she began performing Turkish songs and later became a backing vocalist for Fatih Erkoç. While studying at Nişantaşı Anadolu Lisesi, she participated in the High School Music Competition organized by Milliyet and was chosen as the "Best Female Teenage Soloist". She had her debut at the Aziz Üstel's TV program Gecenin Konukları after which she became famous. Through this program she met Mine Çağlıyan, with whom she formed the duo Ajlan-Mine. The two released their first album Aşkolsun in December 1993. The album was successful, however, Ajlan and Mine parted ways a year later.

== Death ==
In the morning of 22 July 1999, she died at the age of 28 as a result of a traffic accident in Fethiye, Muğla. According to the witnesses' testimony Ajlan Büyükburç, who had received her driver's licence three days prior to the accident, was driving fast and after reaching a sharp turn had tried to stop the car while in panic. The car got out of the way and after three roll-overs hit a parked tractor. Ajlan Büyükburç lost her life in the shattered car. Fethiye State Hospital autopsy report after the incident showed that there were three fractures in her neck and arm, and she had suffered from lung hemorrhage, head trauma, and neck fracture. It was later reported that 4 more accidents had occurred in the same area due to the newly poured stone chips on the road and the family of two of those victims sued the municipality for causing the accidents.

Büyükburç, who was planning to collect her favorite jazz songs in an album, had started to work on this project. She had also started working on a pop album, for which she had received a song from Aysel Gürel titled "Vursalar Ölmem".

== Discography ==
- Aşk Olsun (1993)
- Tutunup Kendime (1995)
