= Little Lucy =

Single by Erol Büyükburç

from the album Little Lucy
- B-side: "'Oh Carol!'"
- Released: 1958
- Genre: Pop
- Label: Odeon
- Songwriter(s): Erol Büyükburç

Little Lucy was a popular song which was a hit in 1961 in Turkey.

Before the 1960s, Turkish pop music was mostly covers of west European melodies. There were a few compositions in Turkish also. Towards, 1960 Erol Büyükburç composed and sang Little Lucy. He also wrote the lyrics. This is considered as one of the milestones in Turkish popular music. Not only because it was one of the earliest popular music compositions which the music enthusiasts warmly greeted, but also it was sung in English, quite unlike the earlier examples.

The 78 rpm record was released in 1961 by Odeon Records. At the reverse of the record, Erol Büyükburç sang a cover of Neil Sedaka's Oh! Carol.
