= Erol Büyükburç =

Turkish singer, composer, and actor (1936-2015)

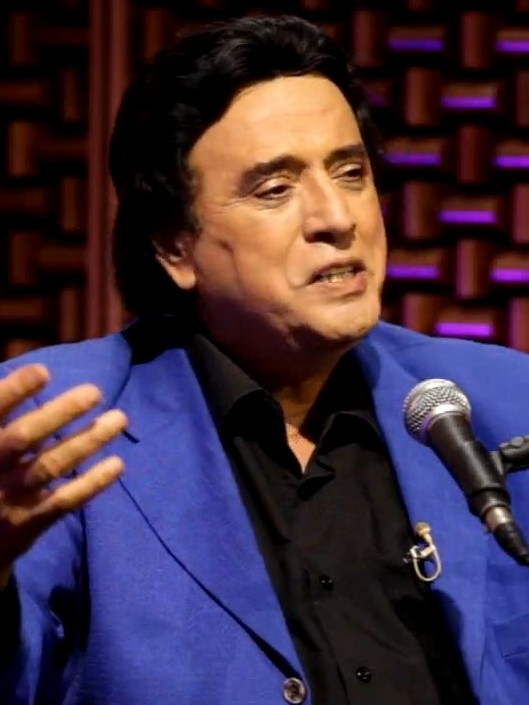

Background information
- Born: Zekeriya Erol Büyükburçlu; 8 August 1936; Adana, Turkey
- Origin: Istanbul, Turkey
- Died: 12 March 2015 (aged 78) Etiler, Istanbul, Turkey
- Genres: Anatolian rock, rock 'n' roll, Turkish pop music, Ottoman classical music
- Occupations: Singer, composer, actor

Erol Büyükburç (8 August 1936 – 12 March 2015) was a Turkish singer-songwriter, pop music composer, and actor.

== Early years and family life ==
Büyükburç was born on 8 August 1936 in Adana. After primary school in his hometown and commerce-high school in Istanbul, he briefly studied economy the Istanbul University. However, he abandoned the higher education after choosing a music career.

From his relationship with Türkan Türker, he had two daughters; Ajlan (born in 1970) and Jeyan (born in 1977). Ajlan, a talented singer, died at age 28 in a car accident on 22 July 1999. Büyükburç was hospitalized into the intensive care unit with heart problems after learning about the death of his daughter, whom he loved very much. He had adopted Ajlan in her later years while he did not recognize his other child Esra Elik, a daughter from his relationship with Seher Elik.

He first married 24-year-old Emel in 1976. From this marriage, he became the father of daughter Evren in 1978. His wife Emel died from cancer on 22 September 2001. After Emel's death, he married Gönül Demirkol and had a daughter, Özlem. Erol and Gönül divorced after one and a half years. Later, he married a German citizen Ute User in 2004.

== Career ==
=== Music ===
While studying in university, he entered Istanbul Municipal Conservatory. Later, he began singing in various jazz bands. During his compulsory military service in Urfa he served in the officers' clup as a singer. Upon returning to Istanbul, he was introduced to music producers by Leyla Sayar a well known actress whom he met in Urfa. In 1961, he composed his best known hit Little Lucy. He also wrote the lyrics of this melody. Before the 1960s, Turkish pop music was mostly covers of West European melodies. There were a few compositions in Turkish also. Little Lucy is considered as one of the milestones in Turkish popular music. Not only because it was one of the earliest popular music compositions, which the music enthusiasts warmly greeted, but also it was sung in English, quite unlike the earlier examples. Kiss me, Lovers Wish and Memories were also his English-lyrics compositions.

In the Balkan Music Festival held on 2 September 1964, he won the Best Singer title. The next year, he won the Bosphorus Music Festival Award. After the 1980s, he began singing in various genres including children's songs and football teams' songs.

=== Film ===
Beginning by 1964, Erol Büyükburç played in musical films. He also appeared as juror in the Show TV singing contest titled Şarkı Söylemek Lazım (literally "You have to sing") in 2007. A sudden quarrel with the program presenter he picked during the live show of that singing contest caused quite a sensation.

== Death ==
He was found dead by his manager Osman Nuri Yazıcı at his home on 12 March 2015, 10 days before his 79th birthday. He had been treated with implanted coronary stents three times, and suffered from diabetes and hypertension. It was reported that he had died after suffering a heart attack while resting in his apartment in Etiler, Istanbul. He had a stage concert scheduled in Bursa the evening of the day he died.

Following a memorial ceremony in Cemal Reşit Rey Concert Hall, and the religious funeral service at Levent Mosque, he was laid to rest in Zincirlikuyu Cemetery. He was survived by his former wife Ute User, children Jeyan Büyükburç, Evren Büyükburç Erol, musician Özlem Büyükburç Kaya, his grandchildren Armağan and Lalehan Kaya.

== Discography ==
Singles

- 1961-Little Darling / One Way Ticket
- 1961-Little Lucy - Oh Carol
- 1961-Kiss Me / It's Now Or Never
- 1961-A Lover's Wish / El Matador
- 1962-You Mean Everything To Me / A Promise
- 1963-Barcelona / Memories
- 1965-Lonesome Stranger / For You
- 1965-Kayadan Indir Beni / Gel Kaçma
- 1965-Karakas Gözlerin Elmas - Tamo Et T'amero / Kapi Önünde Durdum
- 1965-Marguerita / Turnalar - El Toro
- 1966-Aglarim / Vino - Dinero E Amore
- 1966-Gaziantep Yolunda / Çilli Horozum
- 1967-Postaci / Altin Tasta Üzüm Var - Askimizin Sarkisi
- 1967-Gülle Bülbül / Cilveli Ferda - Gül Budanmis
- 1967-Son Tren / Mühür Gözlüm
- 1967-Granada / Era Mezzanote
- 1967-Gitano / Malaguena
- 1967-Ask Yolunda / Zeynebim
- 1967-Kizilciklar Oldu Mu / Mineler
- 1968-Sus Sus Sus / Yeni Bir Ask Ariyorum
- 1968-Pinar Fadime / Uçun Kuslar
- 1968-Gel Gir Koynuma / Vazgeçemem
- 1968-Gözlerime Iyice Bak / Kirik Kalp
- 1968-Aska Kapali Kalbim / Gül Ayse
- 1968-Elmali Bahçe / Neseli Birsen
- 1968-Kirik Kalp / Gözlerime Iyice Bak
- 1968-Gecelerin Sarkisi / Ho La Tu A Vu
- 1968-Ali Baba Kirk Haramiler / Yasemin
- 1968-Nerdesin / Alaaddinin Sihirli Lambasi
- 1968-Almila / Bu Ne Yalan Dünya
- 1968-Nisan Yagmuru / Istanbul
- 1968-Niksarin Fidanlari / Hey Onbesli
- 1968-Inleyen Nagmeler / Yalan Gözler
- 1969-Artik Sevmiyecegim / Serseri
- 1969-Broken Heart / Jasmin
- 1969-Dag Çiçegi / Izmir Geceleri
- 1969-Ver Elini Ankara / Solmayan Ask
- 1969-Mutlu Günler / Son Yaprak
- 1969-Sana Muhtacim / Gözlerin Yeter Bana
- 1970-Bir Baska Sevgiliyi Sevemem / Berdus
- 1970-Kölen Olayim / Aldandim (Mürüvvet)
- 1970-Öp Beni / Ben Ettim Sen Etme
- 1970-Yalnizlik Yarasi / Ask Denen Sey
- 1970-Göze Geldik / Avare Asik
- 1970-Fistik Gibi / Siir Gibi Kizdi O
- 1971-Feryat / Derbeder
- 1971-Misket / Emmim Kizi
- 1972-Memberi / Ask Atesi
- 1972-Manolya / Torero
- 1972-Tatli Dile Güler Yüze - Bagdatli / Gözler - Baglamamin Telleri
- 1972-Züleyha / Dadas - Gel Bana Güle Güle
- 1973-Hekimoglu / Çökertme
- 1973-Oy Cemo - Ne Güzel Yaratmis Yaratan / Vur Zilleri Zilleri - He Gönül He
- 1973-Takvimdeki Günler / Yikilsin Bu Meyhane
- 1974-Zambaklar Açarken / Elbet Bir Gün Bulusacagiz
- 1974-Elele / Dudaklarimda Sarkisin
- 1974-Gençlik Sarkisi / Hersey Bizim Bu Gece
- 1974-Civciv Çikacak Kus Çikacak / Allahim Benide Gör

EPs

- 1965-Erol Büyükburç
- 1972-Burcu Burcu
- 1973-Oy Cemo

Albums

- 1968-Altın Besteleri - Kırık Kalp
- 1968-Yasemin
- 1976-Hop Dedik

V/A Compilations

- 2001-Kaç Yıl Geçti Aradan Türk Pop Müzik Tarihi "1960-70'li Yıllar"
- 2005-Love, Peace & Poetry: Turkish Psychedelic Music
- 2006-Söz: Çiğdem Talu

== Filmography ==
- Plajda Sevişelim / Neşeli Aşıklar (1964)
- Horoz Nuri (1965)
- Kızılcıklar Oldu Mu (1967)
- Gençlik Türküsü (1967)
- Yasemin'in Tatlı Aşkı (1968)
- Bir Damat Aranıyor (1968)
- Sus Sus Kimseler Duymasın (1968)
- Menekşe Gözler (1968)
- Berduş (1969)
- Öp Beni (1970)
- Avare Aşık (1970)
- Turist Ömer Boğa Güreşcisi (1971)
- Haydi Gençlik Hop Hop (1975)
- Oldu Olacak (1976)
- Cıbıl (1976)
- Kader Rüzgarı (1976)
- Kurban Olayım (1976)
- Ah Bu Sevda (1977)
- Bitmeyen Azap (1980)
- Enayiler Kralı Murtaza (1987)
- Reklam Filmi:Shubuo Kral (2003)
- Nerdesin Firuze (2003)
- Hababam Sınıfı Merhaba (2004)
- Şöhret Okulu (2007)
