= Anatolian blues =

Type of Turkish music

- Stylistic origins: Blues; Turkish folk music
- Cultural origins: After the 1970s, Turkey

Anatolian blues or Turkish blues music is a type of music that is a combination of Turkish folk music and blues. Yavuz Çetin, Asım Can Gündüz and Can Gox are the most known singers and musicians in Anatolian blues music.

== History ==
After the 1970s, blues and jazz music became more common and have been started to use with the traditional folk music, Türküs, this has led to the Anatolian blues genre to born in Turkey.

== Musicians and musical groups ==
- Yavuz Çetin
- Can Gox
- Murat Ertel
- Asım Can Gündüz
- Evrencan Gündüz

Groups

- Blue Blues Band
- Gevende
- Eis Ten Polin
- Bangkok B.B.
- Better Blues Band
- Bluesaint Blues Band
- Blues-Mobil
- Bluestaff
- Fötr Blues Band
- Kingus Blues Band
- Lackawanna Soul & Blues Band
- Tarık Değirmenci Blues Band
- Sahte Rakı Blues Band
- Yiğitcan Sağır Trio

== See also ==
- Turkish folk music
- Anatolian rock
