= Merve Daşdemir =

Turkish singer

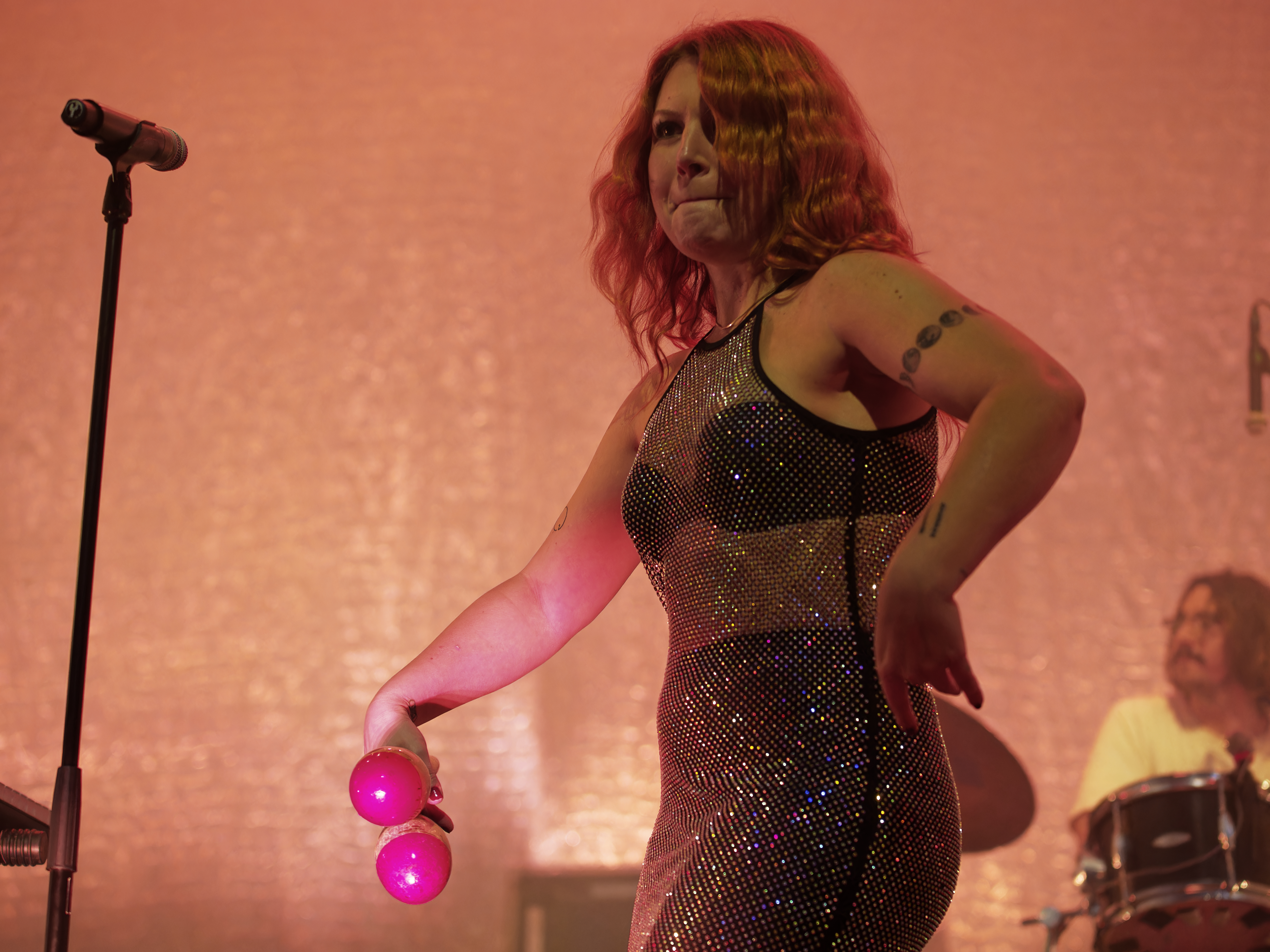
- Merve performing in Utrecht, Netherlands in 2022

Background information
- Born: Merve Daşdemir; September 20, 1987 (age 38); Istanbul, Turkey
- Genres: Anatolian rock; Turkish folk; psychedelic rock

Merve Daşdemir, also known professionally as Merve (stylized in all caps), is a Turkish-Dutch singer and musician best known as a former vocalist and keyboardist for the Anatolian rock band Altin Gün.

== Music career ==
Merve joined Altin Gün in 2016 after responding to an online ad posted by future bandmate Jasper Verhulst who was looking to form a band that would combine the sounds of traditional Turkish rock with psychedelia. The band released five studio albums with Merve as a lead vocalist. In 2019, their sophomore album, Gece was nominated for the 62nd Annual Grammy Awards (2019) in the Best World Music Album category. Together they have made multiple tours of Europe and North America and have performed at Coachella. Merve's fifth and final studio album with Altin Gün, titled Aşk was released in March 2023. Prior to her departure from the band, she provided vocals for a couple more singles, "Vallahi Yok" and "Kirik Cam".

In February 2024, the band announced on their social media pages that Merve had decided to quit the band and begin a solo career. She continued to perform with Altin Gün until the following May. In February 2025, she released her first solo single titled "Platonik" as Merve. The song was co-produced with Christopher McLaughlin and a music video was directed by Tayfun Akbaş. The full album is to be released in the fall of 2025 under her own independent record label called Alabanda Records. Merve is also currently working on a Turkish/Hindi musical collaboration with Piya Malik of Say She She. After 11 years living in the Netherlands, Merve relocated to Turkey since her departure from Altin Gün.

== Personal life ==
In 2017, Merve married Jan Derks, bassist for the band Chef'Special.

== Discography ==
=== Albums ===
- Platonik (2025)

=== Singles ===
- "Platonik" (2025)
- "YGO (Yarınlar Güzel Olacak)" (2025)
