= Çilekeş =

Turkish rock band

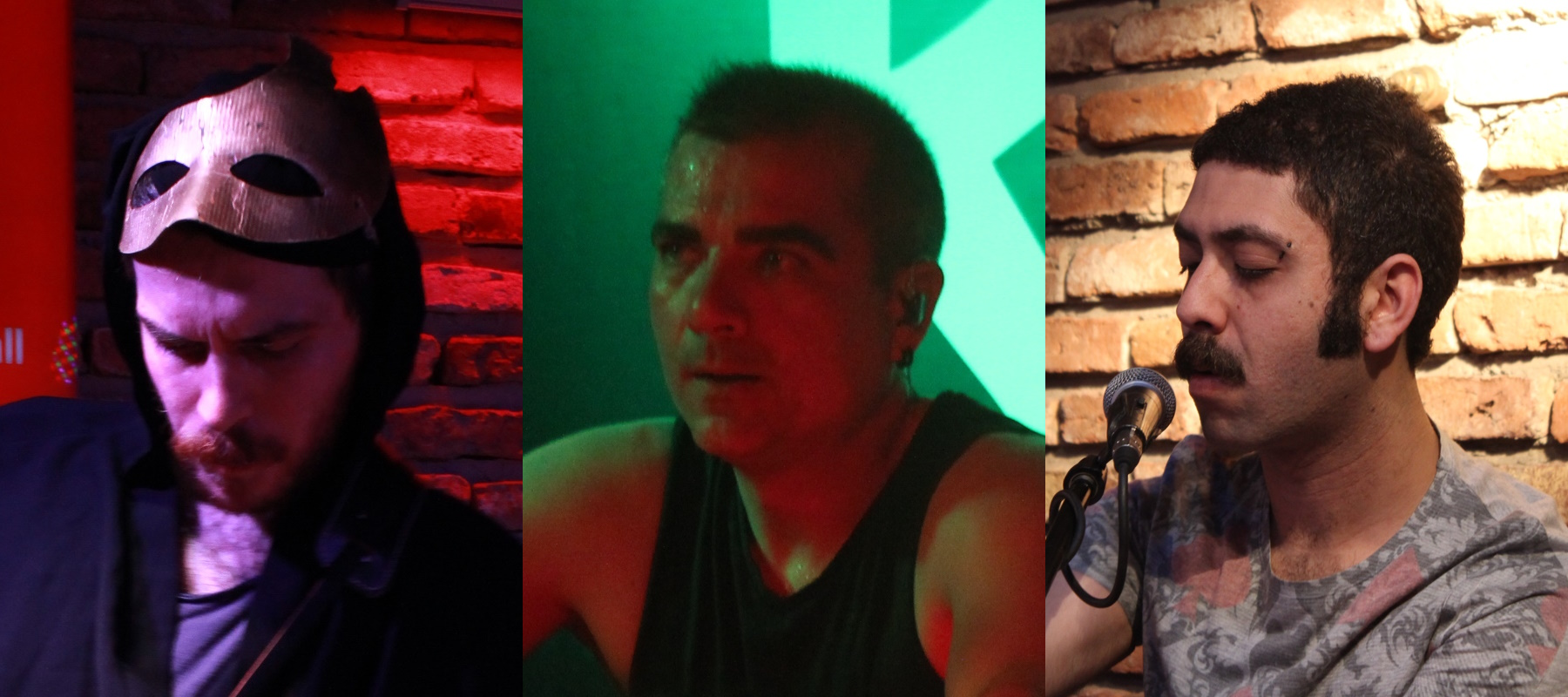
- Ali Güçlü Şimşek, Cumhur Avcil, and Görkem Karabudak

Background information
- Origin: Ankara, Turkey
- Genres: Alternative metal, alternative rock, nu metal, progressive rock
- Years active: 2002–2014, 2026-present
- Label: On-air
- Members: Ali Güçlü Şimşek (guitar); Cumhur Avcil (drums); Görkem Karabudak (vocals)
- Past members: Gökhan Şahinkaya (bass)
- Website: Official website

Çilekeş ([t͡ʃilekeʃ] chi-leh-KESH, lit. 'Sufferer') was a Turkish rock band formed in 2002. The band has been on an indefinite hiatus since 2014.

== Band history ==
Çilekeş was founded in 2002 in Ankara. The band received greater fame after winning the music contest "Genç Yetenekler Aramızda" (Young Talents Among Us), sponsored by the Fanta drinks company, in 2003, juried by such famous Turkish artists like Teoman and Levent Yüksel. After the contest, still as an amateur band, they were invited to a tour, comprising 17 cities, during which they performed to an approximate total of 350,000 audience.

The band members are Görkem Karabudak (vocals, rhythm guitar), Ali Güçlü Şimşek (lead guitar), Gökhan Şahinkaya (bass guitar), Cumhur Avcil (drums).

The band's first album, entitled Y.O.K. was released by On-air in 2005. They released their second work entitled Katil Dans in 2008. At 2010, they released their third album Histeri Çalışmaları which is available for download at their official web page.

After a months-long silence on Facebook, the band's official page posted on January 21, 2014, that [translated into English from the original Turkish] "Bubituzak appeared when Çilekeş was about to rest for a while," insinuating that Karabudak and Şimşek were now instead focused on their next project, Bubituzak.

On January 24, 2026, the band announced their return on Instagram along with a concert at KüçükÇiftlik Park in Istanbul in October 2026.

== Discography ==
Y.O.K. (Onair Müzik) (2005)

1. Kendimden geriye - 3:56
2. Y.O.K. - 4:41
3. Çilekeş (Ardıma hiç bakmadan) - 3:41
4. Gözaltı - 3:51
5. Kurar - 4:35
6. Yetmiyor - 4:36
7. Körpe - 4:33
8. Sorma - 4:39
9. Siyah - 4:45
10. Yeniden - 3:50
11. Kendimden geriye II - 18:26

Katil Dans (P.i. Müzik) (2008)

1. Akrep - 5:50
2. Diril - 5:08
3. Katil Dans - 6:44
4. Her Deniz - 4:05
5. Kulağakaçan (Instrumental) - 1:44
6. Hıt Dalasi - 3:02
7. Sinir - 5:11
8. Bir Ses Yap - 4:22
9. Pervazda Tatil (feat. Şebnem Ferah) - 7:09

Histeri Çalışmaları (Lin Records) (2010)

1. Tanı - 0:51
2. Takla - 5:50
3. Hezarfen - 3:21
4. Havale - 4:42
5. Kafakafesi - 5:20
6. Kara Mizah - 4:17
7. Röntgen - 2:04
8. Askı - 6:24
9. Sine - 2:10
10. Taç - 4:51
11. Neva - 8:25
12. Sır - 3:20
