= Palmiyeler =

Turkish indie rock band

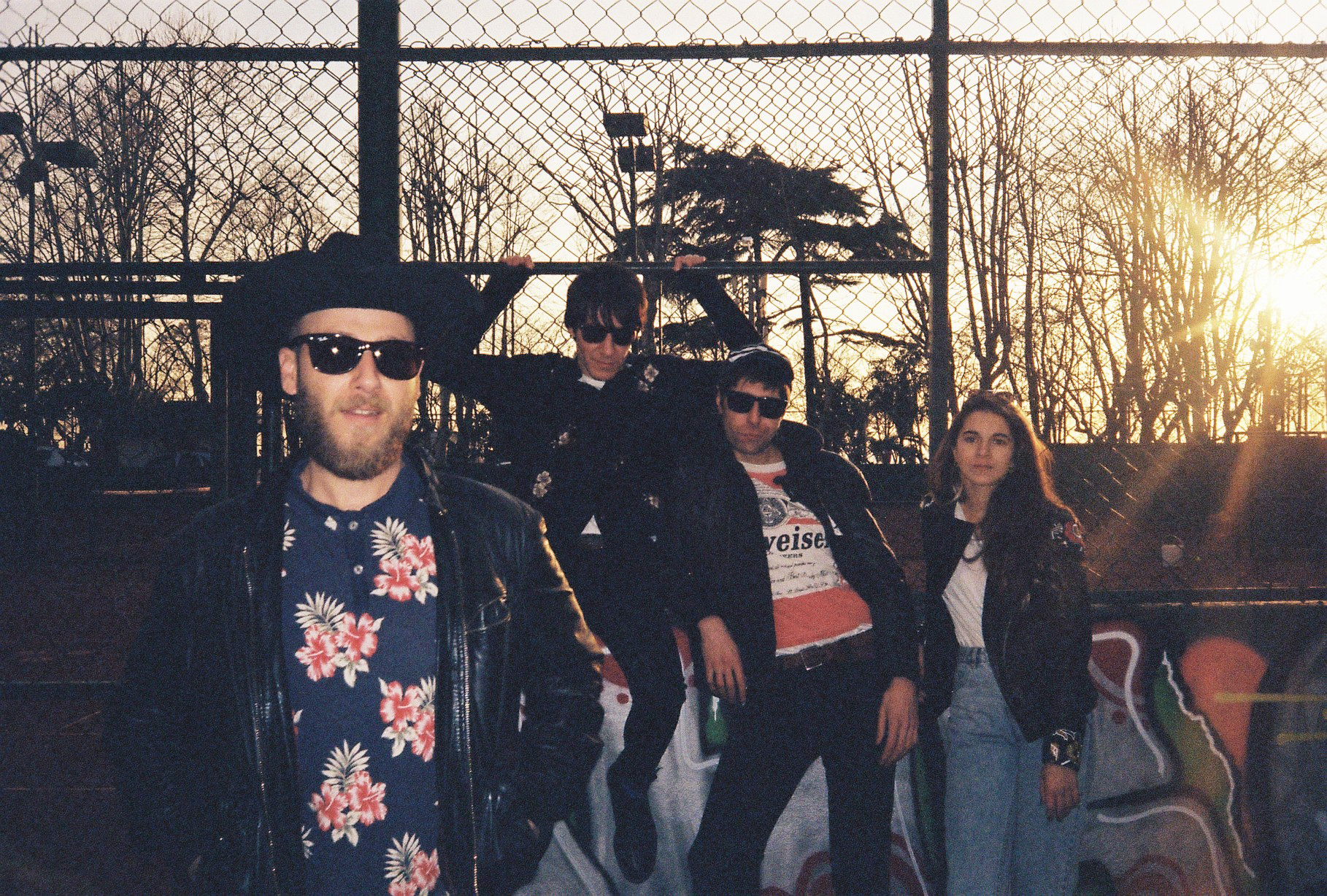

Background information
- Origin: Istanbul, Turkey
- Genres: Surf Rock, Garage Rock, Psychedelic Pop
- Years active: 2013 - Present
- Labels: Tantana Records
- Members: Mertcan Mertbilek; Tarik Tore; Baris Konyali; Rana Uludag
- Website: www.palmiyeler.com

Palmiyeler is a Turkish rock band based in Istanbul, formed in 2013. The band consists of Mertcan Mertbilek (lead vocals/guitar), Tarik Tore (bass), Rana Uludag (drums), Baris Konyali (keyboard/guitar).

== History ==
Palmiyeler recorded their debut EP Palmiyeler in 2013 and released on vinyl and all digital platforms in 2015. A week after the EP release, they were invited to play at the main stage of One Love Festival '15 .

Following their first release in 2015, Palmiyeler returned with II (Venus) the debut LP via Tantana Records in 2017. While being invited to play at Red Bull Music Academy Istanbul after their 2017 release, they released their music videos "Senden Haber Yok", "Karbeyaz" & "Seninle".

II (Venus) has entered best local albums of 2017 lists at major mainstream newspapers Milliyet and Hürriyet as well as other digital media outlets such as Bant Mag and Play Tusu. While II (Venus) was rated 5/5 on Turkey's leading music-related media outlet Play Tusu, Mehmet Tez from Milliyet said the album had the potential to become "a classic at its own genre". While Hikmet Demirkol from Hürriyet wrote: "It is one of the most important contributions of 2017".

Palmiyeler is also known for creating their own visual works ranging from album covers, show posters, and music videos.

On 25 May 2018, Palmiyeler released their second album Akdeniz which was preceded by the release of the single "Kalbim Seni Arar".

== Band Members ==
- Mertcan Mertbilek - lead and rhythm guitars, backing and lead vocals
- Rana Uludağ - drums and percussions
- Tarık Töre - bass, back vocal
- Barış Konyalı - keyboards, guitar

== Discography ==
- Palmiyeler EP (2015)
- II (Venus) (2017)
- Akdeniz (2018)
- Ben-Hür (2019-2020) (2020)
- Şeytan Odama Geldi (2021)
- Ikimiz (2022)
