= Erkin Koray =

Turkish musician (1941–2023)

Mustafa Erkin Koray

Background information
- Also known as: Erkin Baba
- Born: 24 June 1941; Kadıköy, Istanbul, Turkey
- Died: 7 August 2023 (aged 82) Toronto, Canada
- Genres: Anatolian rock; psychedelic rock; folk rock; hard rock; progressive rock
- Instruments: Guitar; electro baglama; vocals
- Years active: 1957–2023
- Labels: Barış Manço; Cem Karaca; Moğollar
- Website: erkinkoray.com

Mustafa Erkin Koray (Turkish pronunciation: [æɾkin ˈkoɾaj]; 24 June 1941 – 7 August 2023) was a Turkish singer and guitarist who mainly played Anatolian rock.

== Life and career ==
Koray was active in the Turkish rock music scene since the late 1950s. In 1967, he released his first single, "Anma Arkadaş".

In the early 1970s, he formed the group Ter with former members of the band Bunalım. They only recorded one single, "Hor Görme Garibi", before breaking up. In 1973, his first solo album, Erkin Koray, was issued. He left Istanbul Records after the release, and in 1974, signed with Doglan Records, which released his dabke single "Şaşkın".

Koray, alongside Orhan Gencebay, were the inventors of the electro baglama, the electric version of a traditional Turkish musical instrument related to the lute.

Koray died on 7 August 2023, at the age of 82, in Toronto, Canada, from lung disease.

== Discography ==
- Erkin Koray (1973)
- Elektronik Türküler (1974)
- 2 (1976)
- Erkin Koray Tutkusu (1977)
- Benden Sana (1982)
- İlla Ki (1983)
- Ceylan (1985)
- Gaddar (1986)
- Çukulatam Benim (1987)
- Hay Yam Yam (1989)
- Tamam Artık (1990)
- Gün Ola Harman Ola (1996)
- Devlerin Nefesi (1999)

== See also ==
- List of Turkish musicians
