= Cultural baggage =

Concept in social science

The term cultural baggage refers to the tendency for one's culture to pervade thinking, speech, and behavior without one being aware of this pervasion. Cultural baggage becomes a factor when a person from one culture encounters a person from another, and subconscious assumptions or behaviors can interfere with interaction.

The "baggage" imagery implies that cultural baggage is something that one carries at all times and that it can be burdensome, hindering freedom of movement (i.e. hinders intercultural dialog). Darret B. Rutman has used the term to describe early European settlers of North America (A Place in Time: Middlesex County, Virginia 1650-1750 by Darret B. Rutman, Anita H. Rutman, ISBN 0-393-30318-7).
