= Anatolian rock =

Genre of music

- Stylistic origins: Psychedelic rock; progressive rock; Turkish folk music; psychedelic folk; folk rock
- Cultural origins: Late 1950s – early 1980s, Turkey

Other topics
- Music of Turkey

Anatolian rock (Turkish: Anadolu rock), or Turkish psychedelic rock, is a fusion of Turkish folk music and rock. It emerged during the mid-1960s, soon after rock groups became popular in Turkey. The most widely known members of this genre include Turkish musicians Barış Manço, Cem Karaca, Erkin Koray, Selda Bağcan, Fikret Kızılok alongside bands such as Moğollar.

== History and development ==
=== Background (1930s-1960s) ===
Anatolian rock has a long history that dates back to the founding of the Turkish Republic decades ago. Atatürk pushed extensive changes to build a national form of music from the early 1930s forward. He believed that music should be based on national and modern foundations and musicians should work on Turkish melodies and make them polyphonic according to the rules of Western harmonic music. As a result, Anatolian folk music began to spread and people began to listen to Anatolian folk tunes instead of Ottoman music.

In the 1960s, rock and roll began to be played and rock groups such as the Beatles, the Rolling Stones, Led Zeppelin, Yes, Status Quo and Omega became popular especially in Istanbul. It began to spread and became popular among the elite youth of the city. In Istanbul, high school and university students began forming their own bands and performing covers of rock'n'roll and twist music in 1957. Students who would become famous singers later, such as Barış Manço from Galatasaray High School and Erkin Koray from German High School, performed at an amateur concert they had organized, which is known as the first rock'n roll concert of Turkey. Turkish singers such as Erol Büyükburç began to release English-language cover versions of American songs, as well as their own songs.

=== Golden age of Anatolian rock and Turkish psychedelic rock (1960s-1980s) ===
From 1957, Turkish radio stations played surf rock by the Tornados and the Ventures, and films with Elvis Presley and Bill Haley were shown in Turkish cinemas. This inspired musicians like Erkin Koray to start already in 1957 with cover versions of rock’n’roll tunes, using the new electric guitar. By the early 1960s, Turkish groups began to perform instrumentals, such as those by the Shadows and the Ventures. Although often locally popular performers, these Turkish groups were rarely recorded. The first original Turkish-language pop song was "Ayrılanlar İçin", released in 1964 by Timur Selçuk. Other singers also emerged, including Barış Manço, who first recorded in the early 1960s before later spearheading the growth of Turkish rock music in the 1970s with albums such as 2023 (1975) and become "the father of Anatolian Rock". At the same time, Turkish society began to undergo significant cultural changes, including the growth of multi-party democracy.

The domestic rock music scene in Turkey expanded rapidly in the mid- and late 1960s. In 1963, guitarist Erkin Koray published "One September Night" (Bir Eylül Akşamı) which is regarded as the first rock'n roll song in the Turkish language and opened a new era, the Turkish psychedelic rock. From 1968 to about 1975, psychedelic rock became popular in Turkey, notably the work of Koray, regarded as a "hugely influential figure on the Istanbul music scene". The band Moğollar are credited with "changing the landscape of Turkish rock by incorporating elements of Anatolian folk music," and, after recording in France as Les Mogol, named their musical genre Anadolu Pop. Another pioneer, Fikret Kızılok, combined the style of Anadolu Pop with overtly political lyrics, and experiments with electronic music.

Turkish musicians also regularly performed at competitive European music festivals. In 1964, Tülay German performed the song "Burçak Tarlası" at the Balkan Music Festival, in a bossa nova style, and became immediately popular. As a direct result, the newspaper Hürriyet organized a "Golden Microphone" (Altın Mikrofon) competition, to encourage the development of new songs in Turkish blending folk tunes and Western style music. This helped identify a new generation of musicians, including the groups Mavi Işıklar, Silüetler, and musicians Cem Karaca, Edip Akbayram, Selçuk Alagöz, and his sister Rana Alagöz. Finalists were awarded with an opportunity to record a 45 rpm single, and a tour across the country. As a result, it caused people outside the big cities to be exposed to this genre.

=== The end of Anatolian rock era (1980) ===
Anatolian Rock remained popular until the late 1970s. During these times, some musicians took a stand in support of the common people. One such person was Selda Bağcan. For young people, popular music became synonymous with leftist thinking, protests for greater equality, freedom and worker's rights. The left-wing views of these artists did not endear them to the authorities. As the 1970s went on, economic recession and social unrest arose across Turkey and on 12 September 1980, military coup brought the Anatolian rock genre to an end. Left-wing rockers faced repression, while the gloomy political atmosphere boosted the popularity of the melancholic Arabesque genre during the 80s.

After the coup, rock musicians were banned from performing, many artists had to flee abroad such as Cem Karaca and some were imprisoned.

=== Era of Turkish rock (After 1990s) ===
As other rock genres gained popularity in Turkey, Anatolian rock also began to diversify and the Turkish rock that came out of this period, was far from its traditional Anatolian-style roots and has no connection with folk music.

In later decades, there has been a growth of Turkish rock bands such as Duman, Mor ve Ötesi, Gece Yolcuları, Almora, Kurban, Kargo, Vega, Çilekeş, Redd, Gripin and maNga, the latter having won the "Best Rock Band" award in almost all polls in 2005. Besides, due to the Turkish migration to Germany, several Turkish-rooted bands also evolved in Germany. In the 1980s as alternative groups: Ünlü (from 1981 on, at the beginning named Fahrstuhl) and the Trial (from 1985 on). The influences acting upon all these bands fall into a wide range of genres, from the Seattle Sound to heavy or doom metal and rapcore. Hence, Anatolian rock refers to a fusion of a wide selection of western rock subgenres with either a traditional Turkish sound or even rock music with Turkish lyrics. Such cultural fusion led the way for rock music to develop in Turkey.

By the end of the 1980s, several metal groups formed in Turkey such as Mezarkabul (Pentagram).

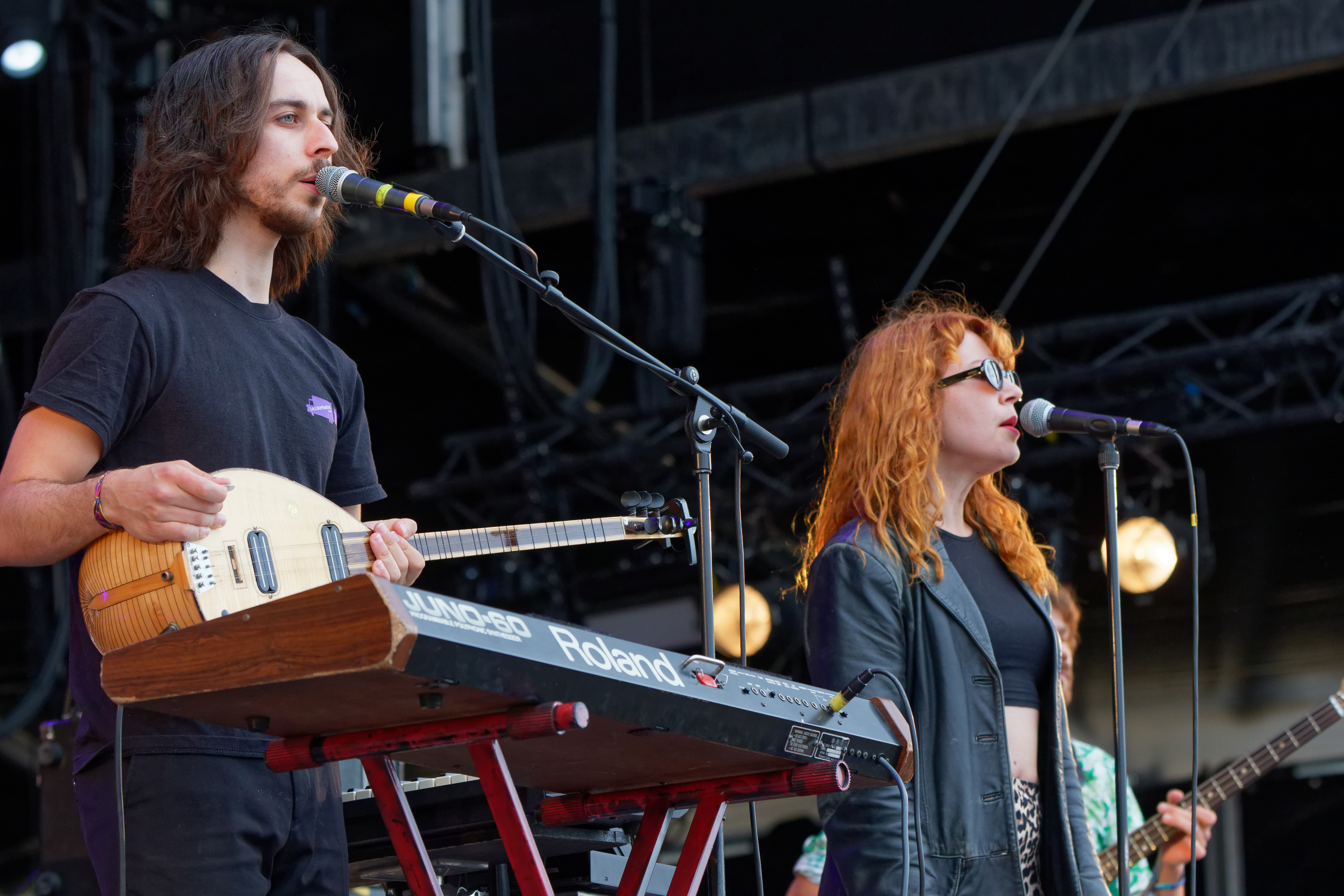
Altın Gün on Festival des Vieilles Charrues in 2018.

=== 2010s ===
In late 2010s, some rock musicians and bands appeared that harmonize folk tunes with rock, such as singer Gaye Su Akyol, and bands like Palmiyeler, Ayyuka, Makas, Dutch Anatolian rock band Altın Gün and UK based Anatolian rock band Kit Sebastian. In 2014, the Anatolian Rock Revival Project started with the vision of preserving the culture of Anatolian rock and transferring it to future generations. Nemrud blends the rich tradition of Anatolian rock with the complexity of Western progressive rock, creating a unique sound.

== See also ==
- Anatolian blues
