= Union Club =

Union Club may refer to:

== Ottoman Empire ==
- İttihatspor, a Turkish football club founded as Union Club in 1908

== United Kingdom ==
- Union Club (Bristol), an 18th-century pro-Whig political club
- Union Club (London), a gentlemen's club in Trafalgar Square, 1827–1923

== United States ==
- Union Club of Boston, Massachusetts
- Union Club of the City of New York
- Pacific-Union Club, in San Francisco, California
- Atherton Hotel at Oklahoma State University, originally the Union Club

== Fictional ==
- Union Club, a club in short stories by Isaac Asimov, many in The Union Club Mysteries
