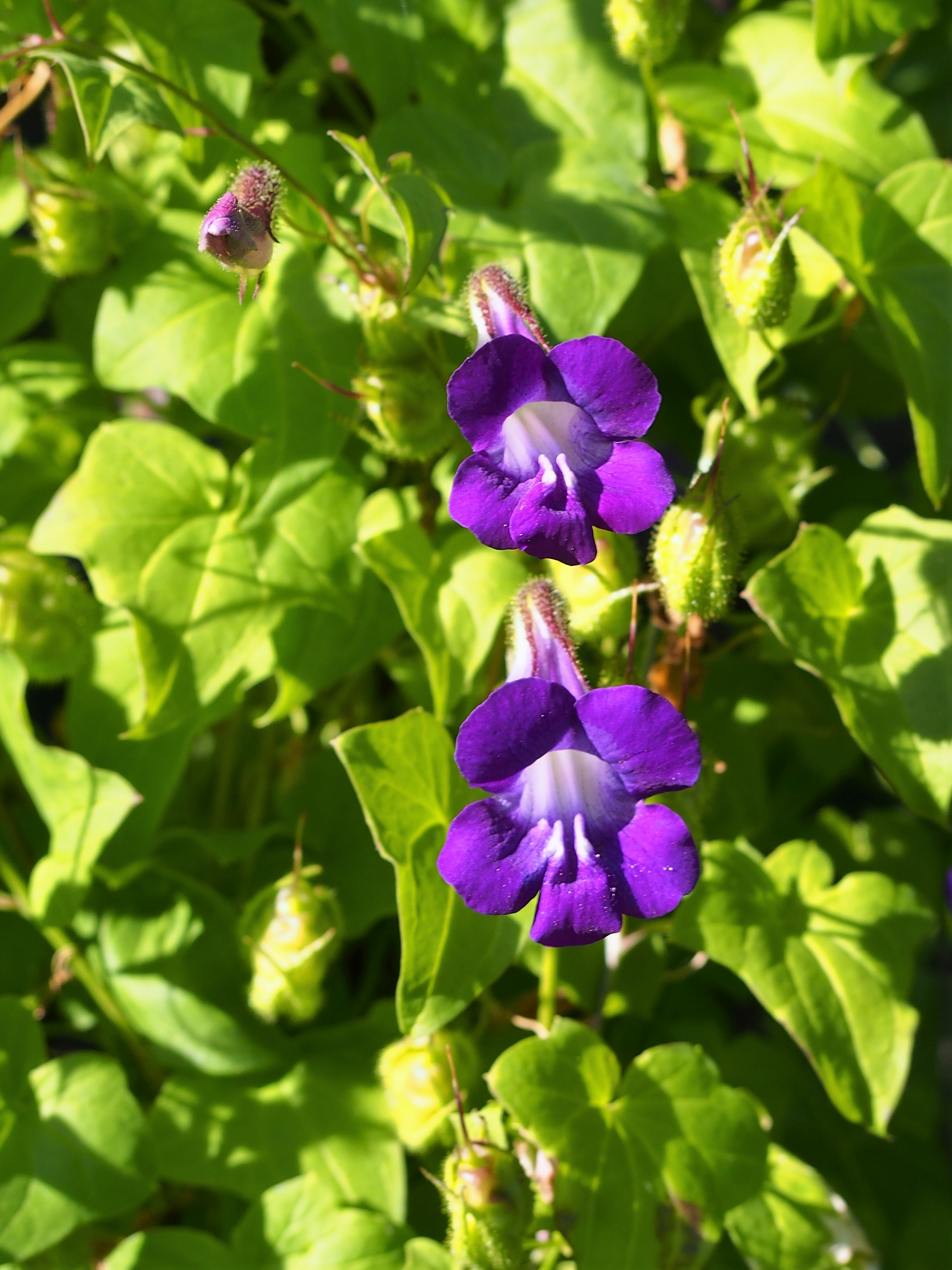

Scientific classification
- Kingdom: Plantae
- Clade: Tracheophytes
- Clade: Angiosperms
- Clade: Eudicots
- Clade: Asterids
- Order: Lamiales
- Family: Plantaginaceae
- Genus: Maurandya
- Species: M. scandens

Binomial name
- Maurandya scandens (Cav.) Pers.

Synonyms
- Asarina scandens (Cav.) Pennell; Maurandya semperflorens Ortega, nom. superfl.; Reichardia scandens (Cav.) Roth; Usteria scandens Cav.

= Maurandya scandens =

Species of flowering plant

Maurandya scandens, also known as trailing snapdragon and snapdragon vine, is a climbing herbaceous perennial native to Mexico, with snapdragon-like flowers and untoothed leaves. It is grown as an ornamental plant in many parts of the world, and has commonly escaped from cultivation to become naturalized. Other names for this plant include creeping snapdragon, vining snapdragon, creeping gloxinia and chickabiddy.

== Description ==
The perennial plant grows up to 2–3 meters tall or long. The alternate, lanceolate to arrow-shaped, entire and lobed to coarsely toothed, pointed, on the lobes, teeth often fine-pointed leaves sit on 8 to 42 millimeters long petioles. The bare leaf blades are 11 to 62 long and 4 to 45 millimeters wide. The shoot axes often form adventitious roots.

It has been confused with Lophospermum scandens, which has longer flowers and larger, toothed leaves. It resembles Maurandya barclayana, which has blue-violet flowers and hairy rather than hairless sepals. It is semi-deciduous in the colder areas.

=== Flowers and reproduction ===
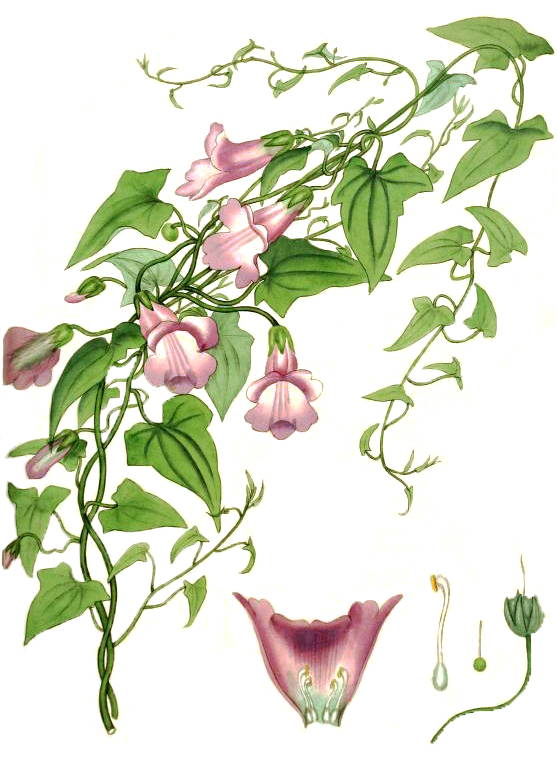
Botanical illustration

The hermaphrodite, tubular flowers appear axillary and solitary, and come in many different colours including rose pink, violet, indigo blue or white, with double perianth. The fivefold flowers feature a wide throat on long, glabrous pedicels, 30 to 85 millimeters long.

The small, ovate-lanceolate and just overgrown tips of the calyx are 10 to 15 millimeters long. They are 2 to 4 millimeters wide at the base and they are bare to sparsely covered with glandular hairs. The crown, slightly hairy on the outside, with shorter, rounded to indented, expansive lobes has two lips.

The 4 short, dynamic stamens are included. The superior, two-chambered ovary is usually bald and the bald, enclosed, relatively short style is 13 to 16 millimeters long. It flowers profusely between spring and summer, and irregularly in the cool months.

The asymmetrical, irregularly ovoid and many-seeded, cartilaginous seed capsules are 10 to 12 millimeters long and are divided into slightly unequal subjects.

== Range ==
The original distribution area are rocky slopes, canyons and disturbed areas in tropical and subtropical forests in southern Mexico at 1200 to 2200 meters above sea level. The species prefers a medium-humid (mesic) biotope. It seems to have established its habitat from the north along the calcareous Sierra Madre and south into the volcanic belt. Due to human displacement, occurrences are now found worldwide.

== Cultivation ==
Cultivars include Joan Lorraine with velvety purple flowers, Snow White with white flowers and Mystic Rose with fuchsia flowers.
