= Kurtalan Express =

Kurtalan Express may refer to:

- Kurtalan Ekspres, Turkish Anatolian rock band
- South Kurtalan Express, Turkish overnight train from Ankara to Kurtalan
