= Bahadır Akkuzu =

- Born: Mehmet Bahadır Akkuzu; February 3, 1955; Istanbul, Turkey
- Died: August 6, 2009 (aged 54); Istanbul, Turkey
- Occupations: Singer, musician, vocalist
- Years active: 1970–2009

Bahadır Akkuzu (February 3, 1955 – August 6, 2009) was a Turkish singer and musician who was a self-taught guitarist and vocalist.

== Biography ==
Akkuzu began playing shows at the age of 15 and at the age of 17 joined a rock and roll group called "4 Adam". This was followed by a stint in "The Signal" and then a long career as a member of the Turkish/Anatolian psychedelic-progressive rock band Kurtalan Ekspres, which he joined in 1978. He was a contemporary of and worked with the famous Turkish musicians Cem Karaca, Erkin Koray, and Edip Akbayram. His band-mate and friend Barış Manço died of a sudden heart attack in 1999 at the age 56. Akkuzu took over singing duties for the band after his friend died.

He was generally considered an experimental rock musician who cited many western influences, among which were classic rock bands such as Deep Purple, Led Zeppelin, Yes, Emerson, Lake & Palmer, Bad Company, Humble Pie, Genesis, Ten Years After, and Rush.

== Death ==
Akkuzu died of a heart attack on August 6, 2009, and was interred at the Zincirlikuyu Cemetery.

== Discography ==
With Kurtalan Ekspres

- Hal Hal / Eğri Eğri Doğru Doğru Eğri Büğrü Ama Yine De Doğru (1981) (Türküola 239)
- 3552 (2003 Sony Müsik)
- Fourteen Numara (1986 Film score)
