= İttihatspor =

- Founded: 1908 (as Union Club); 1920 (as İttihatspor, by Aydınoğlu Raşit Bey)
- Dissolved: 1929
- Ground: İttihatspor Field

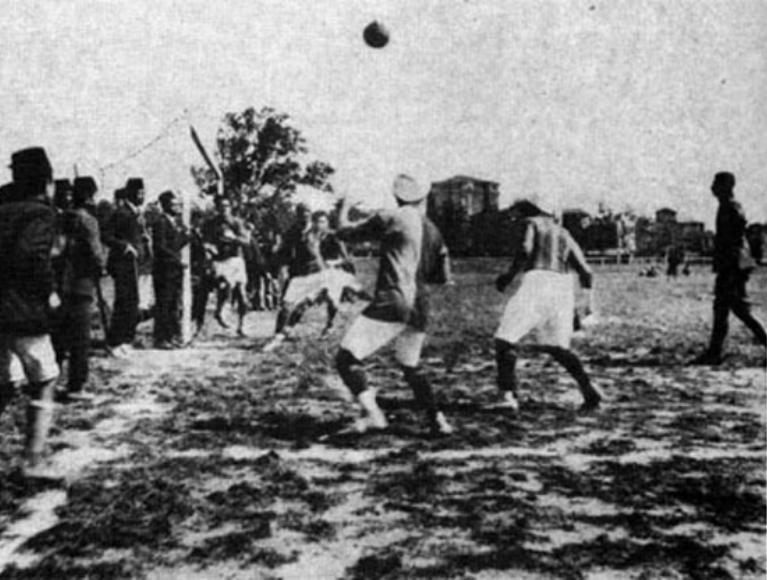
A Galatasaray-Fenerbahçe match in the 1910s held at the Union Club Field

İttihatspor or founded as Union Club in 1908 was a Turkish football club founded by Turkish footballer Ziya Songülen who founded, and later left the major Turkish multi-sport club Fenerbahçe, former mayor of Istanbul Cemil Topuzlu, former Minister of Foreign Affairs in the Ottoman Empire Mehmed Rıfat Pasha, British businessman James William Whittall and English sportsperson James LaFontaine. Union Club was refounded in 1920 with the name İttihatspor by Aydınoğlu Raşit Bey, the same year it became champions of the Istanbul Sunday League.

The Union Club, legally did not have the identity of a sports club. It was considered a commercial and private enterprise.

With the initiatives of the Minister of Finance of the period, Şükrü Saraçoğlu, a decision of the Council of Ministers in 1929 introduced the practice that if there were more than one sports club operating in the same neighbourhood, only the one with the highest number of members would continue its activities and the others would be closed down, and in this context, the activities of İttihatspor, which was located in the same neighbourhood as Fenerbahçe, were terminated. The grounds of İttihatspor were first transferred to the National Real Estate Administration and then leased to Fenerbahçe.

== Union Club Field ==
Papazın Çayırı (later known as Union Club Field and İttihatspor Field) was a former football pitch in the Kadıköy district of Istanbul. Today, Fenerbahçe Şükrü Saracoğlu Stadium is located in the area where the field is located.

It is claimed that the pitch was rented to Fenerbahçe Club for one year in 1909.

== Honours ==
- Istanbul Sunday League

Winners: 1920–21
