= Tubini Mansion =

Ottoman-era mansion in Istanbul, Turkey

- Tubini Köşkü
- Interactive map of the Tubini Mansion area

General information
- Location: Kadıköy, Mühürdar St., Moda, Kadıköy, Istanbul, Turkey
- Coordinates: 40.98836°N 29.02247°E
- Completed: 1850s

Technical details
- Floor count: 2
- Floor area: 465 m^{2} (5,010 sq ft)

Tubini Mansion (Turkish: Tubini Köşkü) is an Ottoman era mansion in Istanbul, Turkey.

== Background ==
Bernard Tubini (1826–1889) with his parents and siblings, joining close members of their wealthy banking family, the Genoese Tubini family of Chios and of Byzantine heritage, immigrated from the Greek island Syros to Constantinople, today Istanbul. They lived in the beginning in Pera, and then moved to around Rumelihisarı, both on the European side of the Ottoman Empire's capital. Finally, they settled in Moda, Kadıköy on the Asian part of the city by building a mansion as a pioneer in a then rural area. He was a banker in Galata, who was involved in financial businesses with the Sultan, via the Ottoman Bank. He also managed an important furniture business in Beşiktaş, where 400 people worked.

== Mansion ==
Tubini Mansion is located at Mühürdar St. in Moda quarter of Kadıköy district in Istanbul, Turkey. It was built on a 588 m^{2} (6,330 sq ft) ground in the 1850s. It has a basement, two floors and an attic covering a total floor area of 465 m^{2} (5,010 sq ft). There are two halls, 14 rooms, five bathrooms and six restrooms. The mansion underwent arenovated in 1977.

After the death of Bernard Tubini, his cousin and co-owner François Nomico (grandson of Francesca Tubini and married to Xanthipe Tubini) built seven identical houses for his seven children around the mansion. Thus, the vineyards and orchards developed to a residential area, and was called "Tubini neighborhood".

Late September 2020, the mansion was put on sale for a price ₺16.5 million (approx. US$2.156 million).
