= Barış Manço =

Turkish musician (1943–1999)

- Barış Manço playing the guitar
- Born: Tosun Yusuf Mehmet Barış Manço; 2 January 1943; Üsküdar, Istanbul, Turkey
- Died: 1 February 1999 (aged 56); Moda, Kadıköy, Istanbul, Turkey
- Occupations: Musician; singer; composer; actor; television producer; show host
- Years active: 1958–1999
- Spouse(s): Marie Claude (m. January – July 1970); Lale Manço (Çağlar) (m. 1978 – 1999)
- Children: 2
- Musical career
- Genres: Anatolian rock; alternative rock; folk rock; progressive rock; psychedelic folk
- Instruments: Vocals; bass guitar; electric guitar; fretless guitar; piano
- Labels: Sayan; Yavuz Plak; CBS Disques / Grammofoonplaten SABV; Türküola; Emre Plak

Signature
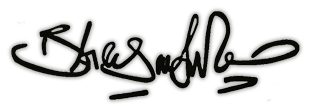

Mehmet Barış Manço (born Tosun Yusuf Mehmet Barış Manço; (Note: Turkish: [toˈsun juˈsuf mehˈmet baɾˈɯʃ manˈtʃo]) 2 January 1943 – 1 February 1999), better known by his stage name Barış Manço, was a Turkish rock musician, singer, composer, actor, television producer and show host. Beginning his musical career while attending Galatasaray High School, he was a pioneer of rock music in Turkey and one of the founders of the Anatolian rock genre, which is still relevant till this day. Manço composed around 200 songs and is among the best-selling Turkish artists to date and the winner of the most awards. Many of his songs were translated into other languages including English, French, Japanese, Greek, Italian, Bulgarian, Romanian, Persian, Hebrew, Urdu, Arabic, and German. Through his TV programme, 7'den 77'ye (From 7 to 77), Manço travelled the world and visited many countries. He remains one of Türkiye's most popular public figures long after his death.

== Early life and career ==
Barış Manço was born in Üsküdar, Istanbul, Turkey on 2 January 1943. Born in Adana, his mother Rikkat Uyanık, was a famous singer in the early 1940s. His older brother, who was also born during World War II, was named Savaş ("War" in Turkish) while he was named Barış ("Peace" in Turkish) by his parents to celebrate the end of the war. At birth, he was additionally named Tosun Yusuf after his deceased uncle Yusuf nicknamed Tosun. However, this name was erased just before he attended primary school.

During his time at Galatasaray High School (and later in Şişli Terakki High School) in the 1950s he formed his first band, Kafadarlar (The Buddies), allegedly after seeing Erkin Koray's band - all students at the nearby Deutsche Schule Istanbul (İstanbul Alman Lisesi) - performing. Prof. Dr. Asaf Savaş Akat, a famous economist in Turkey, played saxophone, while guitarist Ender Enön made his own guitar because it was difficult to find a real one on the market in those years.

In 1962 and 1963, with his next band, Harmoniler (The Harmonies), he recorded cover versions of some popular American twist songs and rearrangements of Turkish folk songs in rock and roll form, thus marking the beginning of the Anatolian rock movement, a synthesis of Turkish folk music and rock. In this period, his key visual and musical influence was Elvis Presley.

After graduating from high school in 1963, he moved to Europe, traveling to Paris and Liège where he formed bands with local musicians and recorded some singles mainly in English and French but also in Turkish. Then, in 1964, he resumed his studies at the Royal Academy of Fine Arts in Liège, Belgium. He toured with his band Les Mistigris (not related to Mistigris) in Germany, Belgium, France and Turkey until 1967.

In 1967, he suffered a serious car accident, after which he started to grow his signature moustache to conceal his scar.

Frustrated by the difficulties of working with musicians from different nationalities, he formed Kaygısızlar (The Carefrees), featuring Mazhar Alanson and Fuat Güner, future members of the band MFÖ. He recorded several singles and toured with the band, both domestically and internationally, until the band members protested that they did not want to live abroad.

In 1970, he formed Barış Manço Ve ... (Barış Manço and ...) again with foreign musicians, to record his first hit single, Dağlar Dağlar (Mountains, Mountains!), which was a success in both Turkey and Belgium, selling over 700,000 copies. It remains one of his most popular songs.

== 1970s ==
After the success of Dağlar Dağlar, Manço recorded a couple of singles with Moğollar (The Mongols), another influential Turkish Anatolian rock band. He then decided to return to Turkey where he recorded with the reformed Kaygısızlar for a short period. In 1971, his early works were compiled under his first full-length album Dünden Bugüne (From Yesterday to Today), today commonly referred to as Dağlar Dağlar.

In 1972, he formed the legendary Kurtalan Ekspres that would accompany him until his death. While continuing to release singles, in 1975 he also released his first non-compilation LP 2023, a concept album that included many instrumental pieces.

In a last attempt to achieve international success, he released an LP simply entitled Baris Mancho (1976), a strange transcription of his name. It was mostly completed with the George Hayes Orchestra on the CBS Records label in Europe and South Africa. Although the album did not bring him the fame he was hoping for, it did top the charts in Romania and Morocco. The following year, the album was released in Turkey under the title Nick the Chopper. In 1975 he starred in the movie Baba Bizi Eversene (Father Make Us Marry), the only movie he starred in during his career. Its music is a compilation of tracks composed by Barış Manço and Kurtalan Ekspres.

From 1977 to 1980, he released three more albums in Turkey, partly consisting of compilations of older singles, namely Sakla Samanı Gelir Zamanı (1977), Yeni Bir Gün (A New Day, 1979) and 20. Sanat Yılı Disko Manço (1980), all following a similar sound to 2023. All these albums are now rarities, but most of the material is available in later compilations Ben Bilirim and Sarı Çizmeli Mehmet Ağa.

== 1980s ==
In 1981, Manço released Sözüm Meclisten Dışarı with Kurtalan Ekspres. It contained many hit songs including "Alla Beni Pulla Beni", "Arkadaşım Eşşek" (My Friend the Donkey), "Gülpembe" (Rose pink), "Halhal" (Anklet), and "Dönence" (Tropic) among others. The album remains one of their most popular works and boosted Manço's popularity during the 1980s.

"Arkadaşım Eşşek" quickly grew very popular with children (the song is about rural nostalgia and was not initially intended as a children's song) and he went on to write many other songs primarily for children, becoming an icon among Turkish children in the 1980s and 1990s.

On the other hand, "Gülpembe", a requiem for Manço's grandmother composed by Kurtalan Ekspres bassist Ahmet Güvenç, attracted older listeners and is probably Manço's most popular song, "Dağlar Dağlar" being its only real competition.

In 1983, Estağfurullah, Ne Haddimize was released. It contained the hit songs "Halil İbrahim Sofrası (Halil İbrahim's Dinner Table)" and "Kol Düğmeleri" (Sleeve Buttons), a new version of the artist's first song. "Halil İbrahim Sofrası" exemplified Manço's typically moralistic lyrics, a rare feature in Turkish pop music.

In 1985, 24 Ayar Manço (24 Carat Manço) which included "Gibi Gibi" and a long conceptual song "Lahburger" was released. It marked the beginning of a shift in Manço's sound characterised by the heavy use of synthesisers and drum machines in contrast with older works made up of a group-oriented, rock-based sound. In subsequent years, Manço released Değmesin Yağlı Boya (1986, A Touch of Oil Paint), Sahibinden İhtiyaçtan (1988) and Darısı Başınıza (1989), all containing a couple of hit songs and demonstrating his new sound.

== 7'den 77'ye and 1990s ==
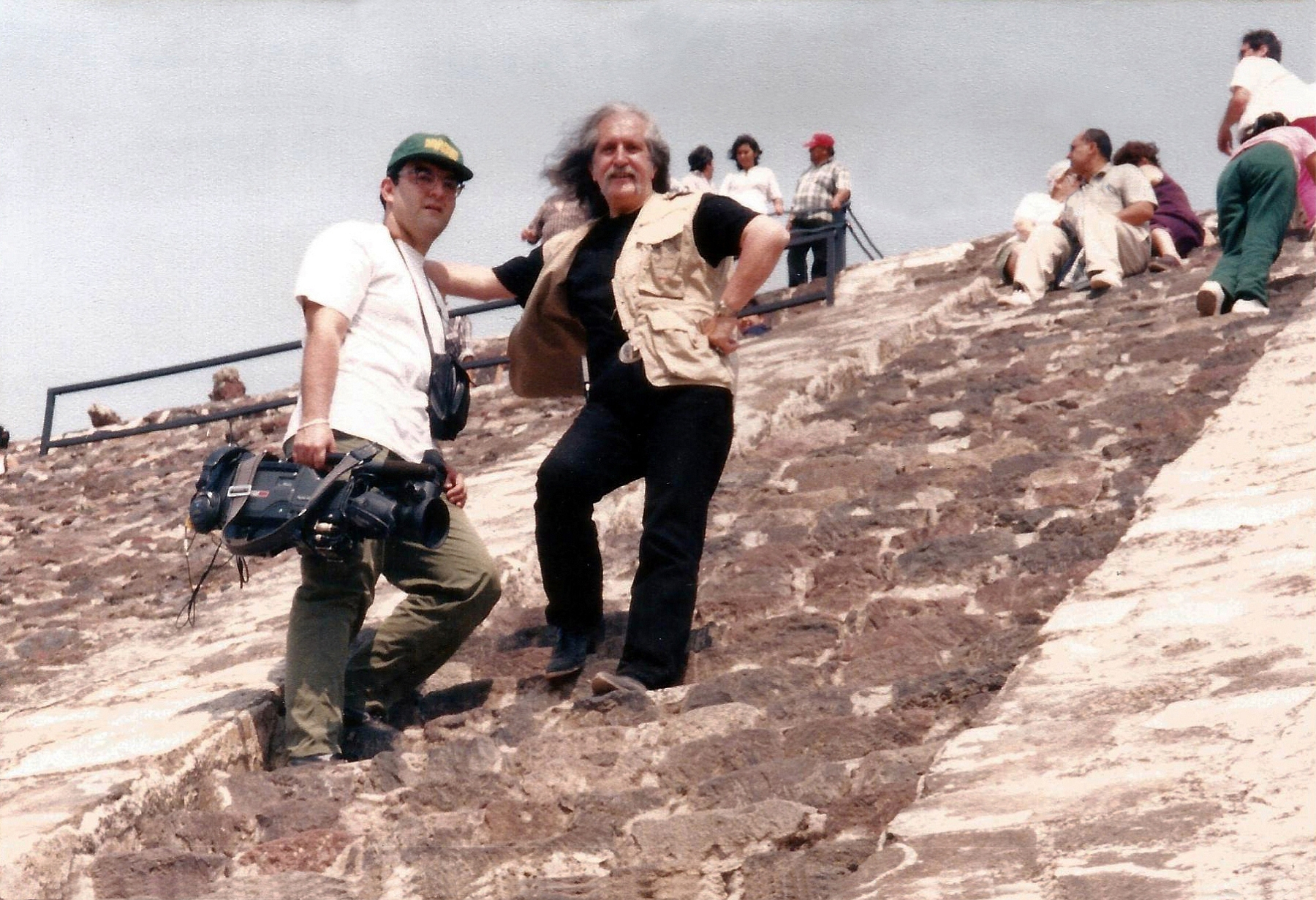
Cameraman Erkan Umut and Barış Manço in Teotihuacan, Mexico in 1998

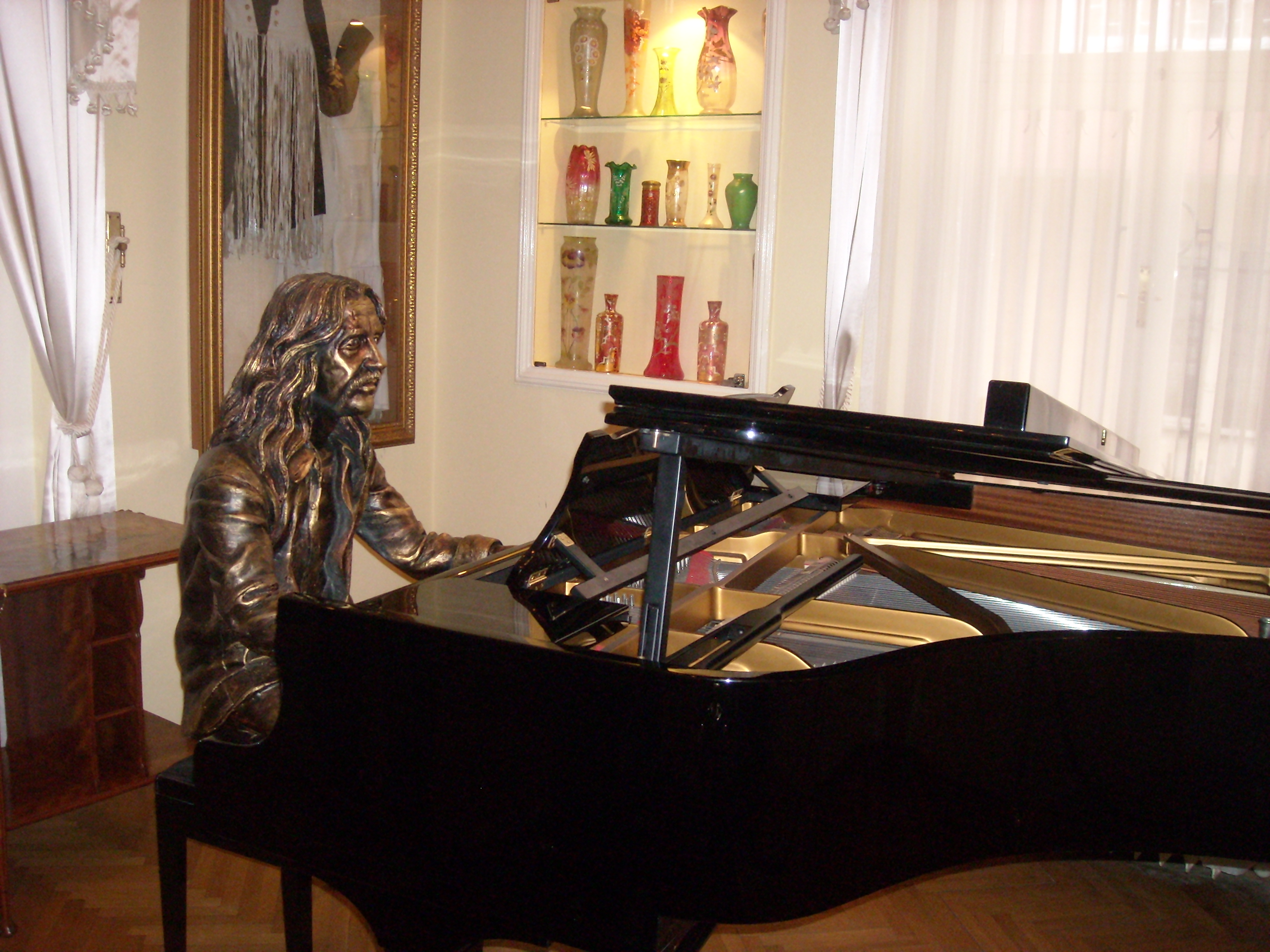
Barış Manço Museum

In 1988, 7'den 77'ye (From 7 to 77), a TV show directed and presented by Manço, began to run on TRT 1, the Turkish state television channel. It was a combined music, talk show, and documentary programme which was a major hit during the eight years it was on air. Manço traveled to almost 150 countries for the show. "Adam Olacak Çocuk (The Child That Will Become A Man)", a section of the show dedicated to children, strengthened Manço's popularity among younger audiences.

Although his fame continued in the 1990s thanks to the success of his TV show, which was popular with all age groups, his music in this period was not as successful as it had been in previous decades. The albums Mega Manço (1992, Great Manço) and Müsadenizle Çocuklar (With your permission, children) (1995) were considered the weakest offerings of his career despite the limited success of the 1992 children's hit Ayı (The Bear). On the other hand, in 1995 he toured in Japan with Kurtalan Ekspres, which leding to Live in Japan (1996), his only live album. He released two albums in that country and gained recognition as "the man who writes songs about vegetables", referring to "Domates, Biber, Patlıcan" ("Tomato, Pepper, Aubergine") and "Nane, Limon Kabuğu" (Mint, Lemon Rind), two of his hit songs from the 1980s.

== Death ==
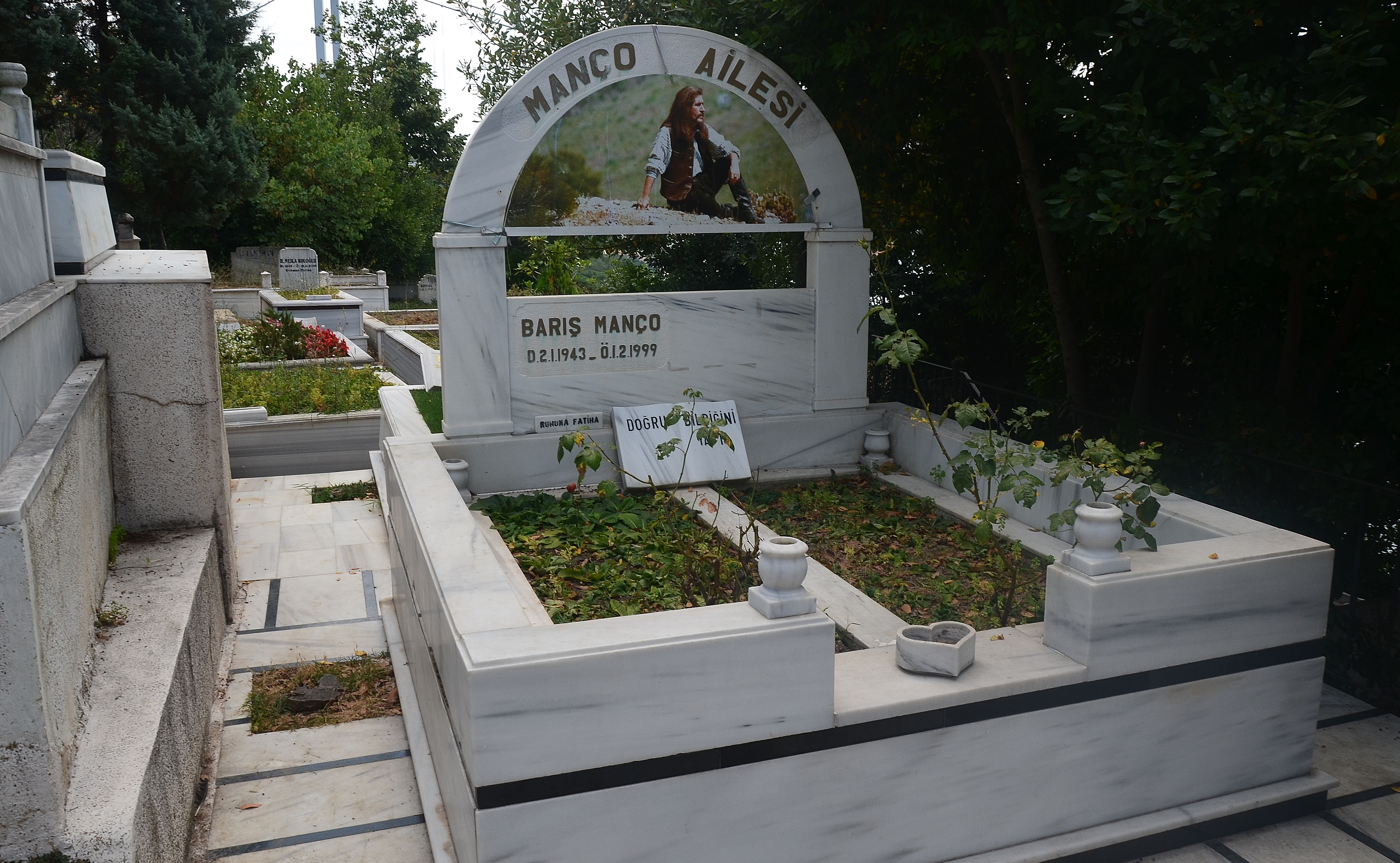
The grave of Barış Manço at Kanlıca Cemetery in Kanlıca, Beykoz

On 1 February 1999, Barış Manço died at his Moda house after suffering a sudden heart attack before the release of his newly completed last work Mançoloji (Mançology or Manchology) (1999), a double album containing new recordings of his hit songs along with an unfinished instrumental song "40. Yıl" (The 40th Year), celebrating his 40th year in music. His sudden death caused almost unanimous shock in Turkey with millions of people mourning and tens of thousands of people attending his funeral.

He was interred in Kanlıca Cemetery in Istanbul.

== Legacy ==
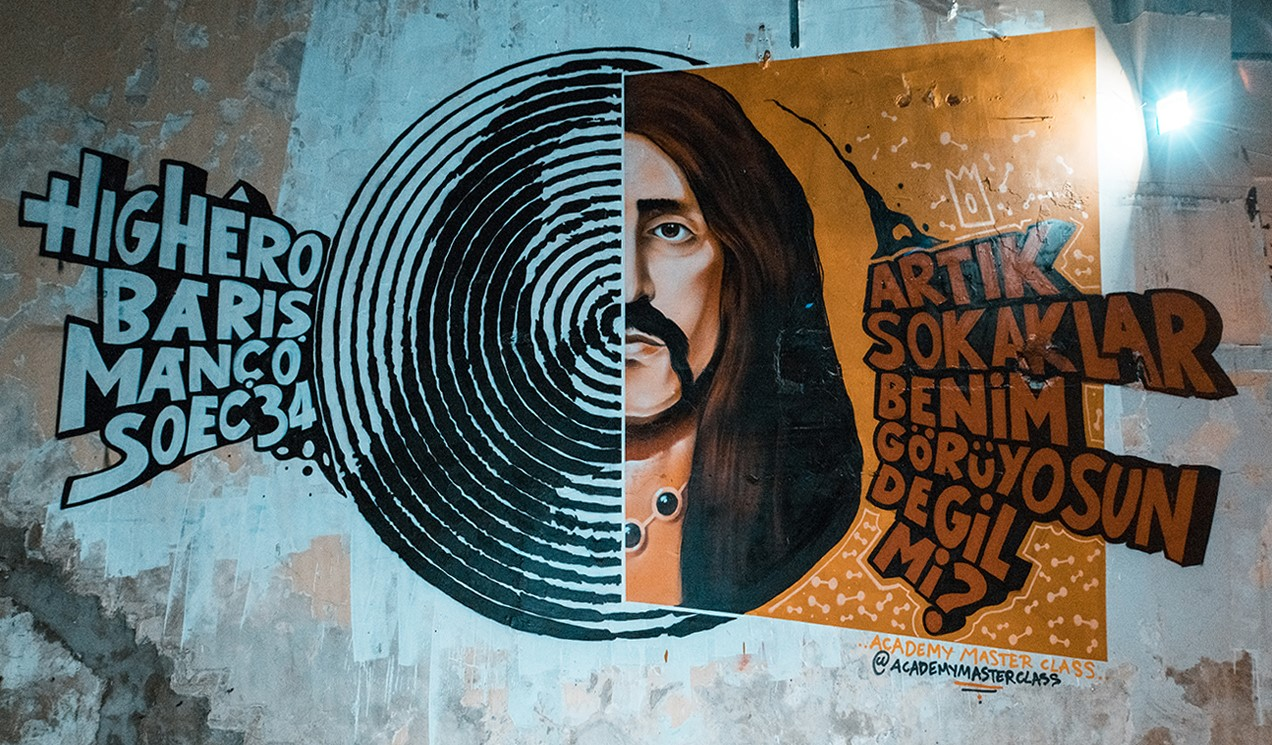
Barış Manço street art

Barış Manço was one of Turkey's most influential pop musicians. In his early career he and his different bands contributed to the Turkish rock movement by combining traditional Turkish folk music with rock influences, which is still one of the main characteristics of many of modern Turkish pop music.

His image, featuring long hair, a moustache and several outsized rings, moderated the reaction of otherwise conservative Turkish public opinion.

Manço pioneered the progressive rock-influenced Anatolian rock movement of the 1970s and his experimentation with electronic instruments a decade later contributed to the sound of Turkish popular music in the 1990s.

His lyrics, covering diverse themes but mostly presenting a somewhat modernised version of the "aşık" (wandering folk poets) tradition, were marginal to the pop music scene of the 1980s which was mostly dominated by love songs.

In 2002, a tribute album was released under the name Yüreğimdeki Barış Şarkıları ("Songs of Barış (Peace) In My Heart"), featuring fifteen popular Turkish artists from such diverse genres as arabesque, and pop and rock (both Anatolian and western style), demonstrating his wide range of influences.

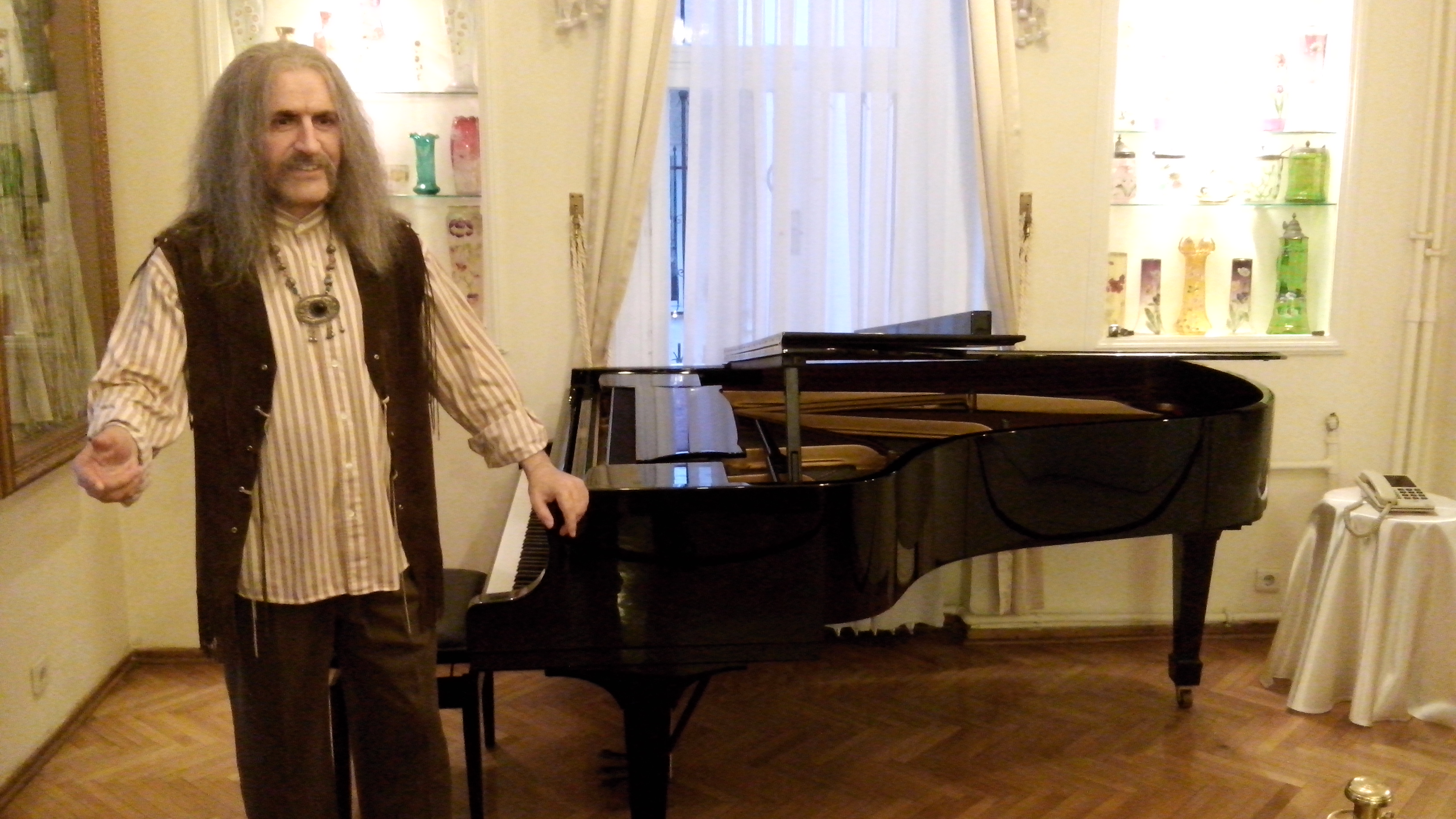
Wax sculpture of Barış Manço in his house (Barış Manço Evi) in the Moda district of Istanbul (now a museum)

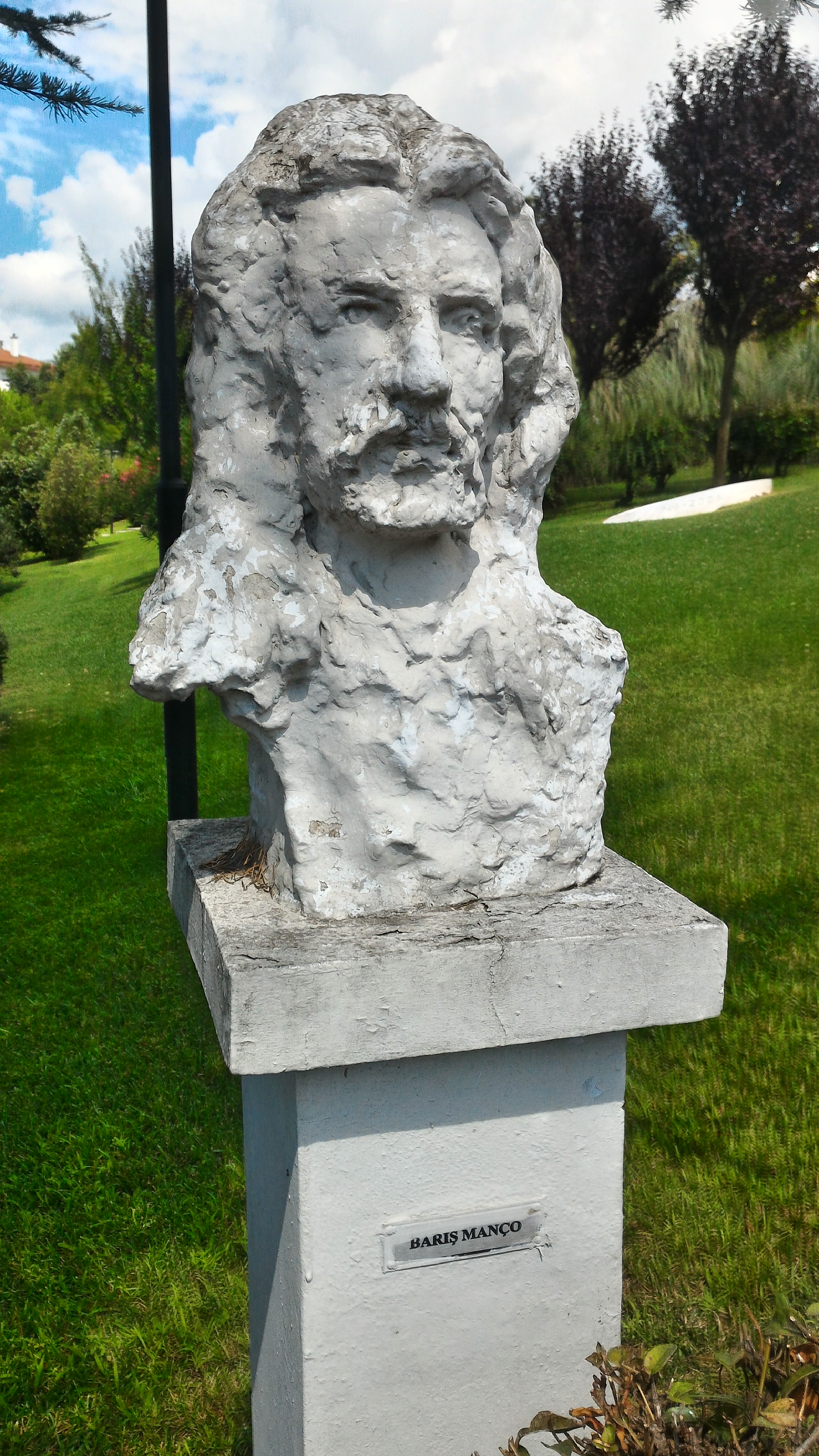
Gürdal Duyar bust of Barış Manço in the İstanbul Artists Park at Akatlar

On 2 January 2013, Google Doodle celebrated Barış Manço's 70th birthday.

== See also ==
- Whittall Mansion, Moda, an Ottoman-era mansion built by James William Whittall in the early 1900s. Used by Barış Manço from 1984, it was transformed into a historic house museum after his death.

== Discography ==
=== Albums ===
- Dünden Bugüne (1972) (Sayan)
- 2023 (1975) (Yavuz Plak)
- Sakla Samanı Gelir Zamanı (1976) (Yavuz)
- Baris Mancho, released as Nick The Chopper in Turkey (1976) (CBS Disques/Grammofoonplaten S.A.B.V., CBS 81784, Yavuz LP)
- Yeni Bir Gün (1979) (Yavuz ve Burç Plakçılık)
- 20 Sanat Yılı Disco Manço (1980) (Türküola)
- Sözüm Meclisten Dışarı (1981) (Türküola)
- Estağfurullah ... Ne Haddimize! (1983) (Türküola)
- 24 Ayar Manço (1985) (Emre Plakçılık)
- Değmesin Yağlı Boya (1986) (Emre Plakçılık)
- 30 Sanat Yılı Fulaksesuar Manço - Sahibinden İhtiyaçtan (1988) (Emre Plakçılık)
- Darısı Başınıza (1989) (Yavuz ve Burç Plakçılık)
- Mega Manço (1992) (Emre Plak)
- Müsaadenizle Çocuklar (1995) (Emre Plak)
- Barış Manço Live in Japan (1996) (Emre Plak)
- Mançoloji (1999) (Emre Plak)
- Barış Manço Golden Rollers (2018) (Tunas Tunes)
- Manlac Blues 9 - Demo 1965 - 1966 Volume 1 (2019) (Tunas Tunes)

=== Singles ===
With Harmoniler

- Twistin USA / The Jet (1962) (Grafson MGG 515)
- Do The Twist / Let's Twist again (1962) (Grafson MGG 516)
- Cit Cit Twist / Dream Girl (1963) (Grafson MGG 566)

With Jacques Denjean Orchestra

- Baby Sitter / Quelle Peste / Jenny Jenny / Un Autre Amour Que Toi (1964) (Rigolo 18.726)

With Les Mistigris

- Il Arrivera / Une Fille (1966) (Sahibinin Sesi 45-AX 3092)
- Bien Fait Pour Toi / Aman Avcı Vurma Beni (1966) (Sahibinin Sesi 45-AX 3093)
- Bizim Gibi / Big Boss Man / Seher Vakti / Good Golly Miss Molly (1967) (Sayan)

With Kaygısızlar

- Kol Düğmeleri / Big Boss Man / Seher Vakti / Good Golly Miss Molly (1967) (Sayan FS-144)
- Kızılcıklar / I'll Go Crazy (1968) (Sayan FS-171)
- Bebek / Keep Lookin' (1968) (Sayan FS-179)
- Karanlıklar İçinde / Trip - To a Fair (1968) (Sayan FS-180)
- Boğaziçi / Flower of Love (1968) (Sayan FS-194)
- Runaway / Unutamıyorum (1969) (Sayan FS-199)
- Aglama Değmez Hayat / Kirpiklerin Ok Ok Eyle (1969) (Sayan FS 204)
- Kağızman / Anadolu (1969) (Sayan FS 213)

With Barış Manço Ve

- Derule / Küçük Bir Gece Müziği (1970) (Sayan FS-223)
- Dağlar Dağlar 1 / Dağlar Dağlar 2 (1970) (Sayan 229)

With Moğollar

- İşte Hendek İşte Deve / Katip Arzuhalim Yaz Yare Boyle (1971) (Sayan FS-266)

With Moğollar / Kaygısızlar

- Bin Boğanın Kızı / Ay Osman (1971) (Sayan FS-271)

With Kaygısızlar / Les Mistigris

- Fil ile Kurbağa / Je te Retrouverais (1972) (Sayan FS 279)

With Kurtalan Ekspres

- Ölüm Allah'ın Emri / Gamzedeyim Deva Bulmam (1972) (Yavuz YA 1544)
- Lambaya Püf De / Kalk Gidelim Küheylan (1973) (Yavuz YA 1548)
- Gönül Dağı / Hey Koca Topcu Genç Osman (1973) (Yavuz YA 1554)
- Nazar Eyle Nazar Eyle / Gülme Ha Gülme (1974) (Yavuz YA 1562)
- Bir Bahar Akşamı / Estergon Kalesi (1974) (Yavuz YA 1569)
- Ben Bilirim /2023 (1975) (Yavuz Plak YA 1573)
- Çay Elinden Öteye Rezil Dede / Vur Ha Vur (1976) (Yavuz Plak YA 1580)
- Ride on Miranda (1976) (CBS / Sony Music)
- Blue Morning Angel (1976) (CBS / Sony Music)
- Tell Me Old Man (1976) (CBS / Sony Music)

With George Hayes Orchestra / Kurtalan Ekspres

- Nick the Chopper / Lonely Man (1977) (Yavuz YA 1584)

With Kurtalan Ekspres

- Hal Hal / Eğri Eğri Doğru Doğru Eğri Büğrü Ama Yine De Doğru (1981) (Türküola 239)

== Filmography ==
- Baba Bizi Eversene (1975)
