= Fuat Güner =

Turkish pop musician (born 1948)

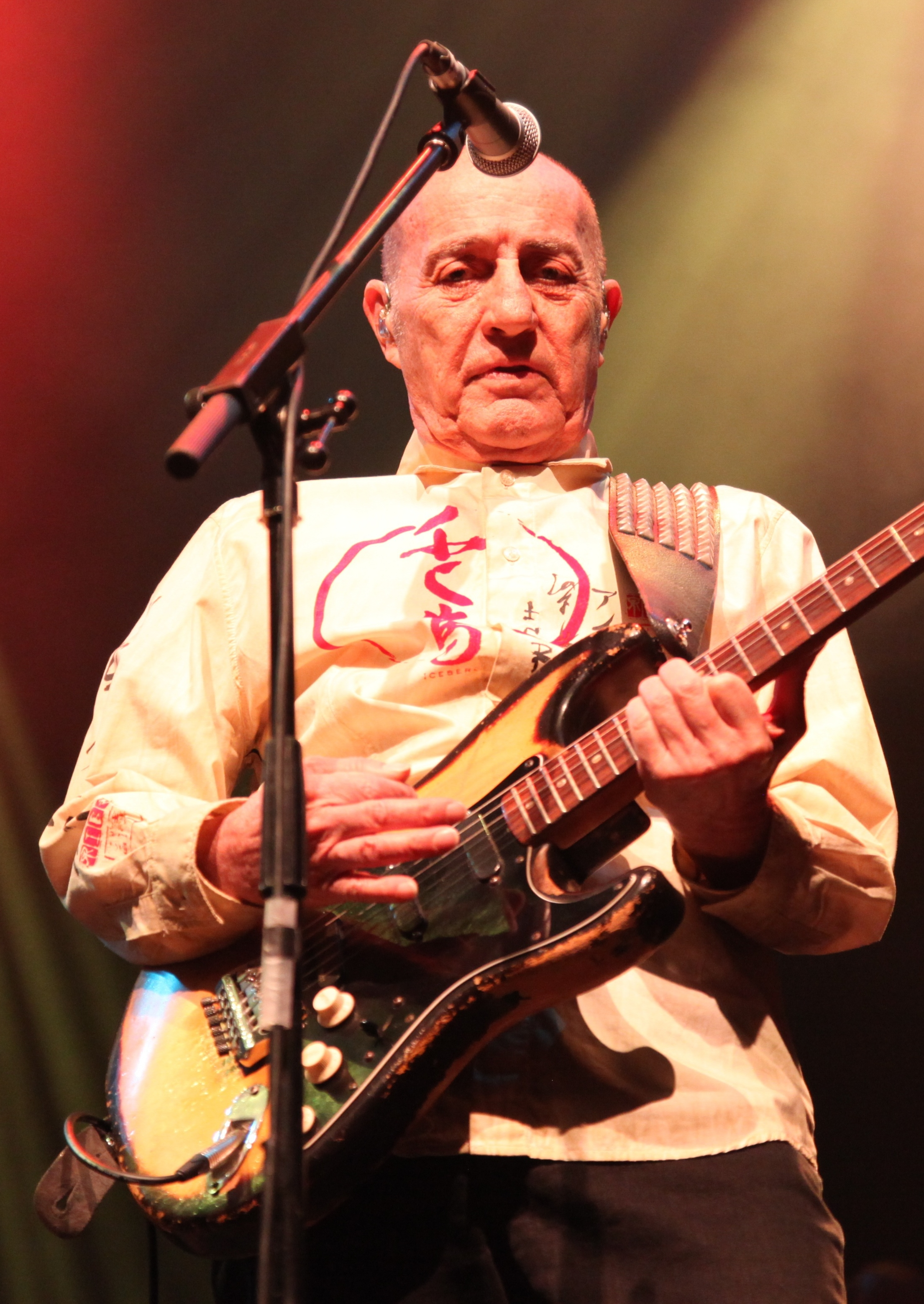
- Güner in 2018

Background information
- Born: Aziz Fuat Güner; 1 April 1948 (age 78); Istanbul, Turkey
- Genres: Pop, rock
- Occupation: Musician
- Years active: 1971–present

Aziz Fuat Güner (born 1 April 1948), better known as Fuat Güner, is a Turkish musician, member of the renowned band MFÖ.

== Early life ==
He was born on 1 April 1948 in Istanbul, Turkey to a renowned photographer father, Sami Güner. He is of partial Albanian descent. During his school years at St. Joseph High School in Istanbul, he was a very active sportsman, playing football, volleyball and sailing. He became a champion in the 400 m category of college athletics in Turkey. After high school, he was trained as a civil engineer at the State Architectural Academy of Istanbul. Fuat Güner worked as an engineer at the State Highway Authority for 3 years and then for 2 years at STFA Group, a private company for infrastructure.

== Musical career ==
However, he was interested more in composing music. So, in 1979 he quit his job and devoted himself professionally to music, he says, when he was paid the equivalent of his annual wages for a single commercial jingle.

He had been playing the guitar during primary school years, since his uncle presented him with an acoustic guitar. In 1966, he met Mazhar Alanson, and soon the two formed the band "Kaygısızlar" ("The Carefree") inspired by the Beatles. Özkan Uğur joined the group in 1972, and the band was renamed MFÖ, for the initials of its members' names. He was also one of the founding members of Kurtalan Ekspres, Barış Manço's band.

MFÖ worked with Turkey's most popular singer Ajda Pekkan, wrote songs and played the concert circuit. In 1984 Fuat invested all the money they earned into recording their first album. The group released the album Ele Güne Karşı Yapayalnız, which hit number one and stayed there for 26 consecutive weeks.

In 1989 Güner joined forces with his friend, Turgut Berkes, to build Turkey's first-ever A-class recording studio, "FT", which became a legend over the years.

In 1998, Fuat Güner teamed up with Dağhan Baydur and Erdal Kızılçay to play Beatles Alaturca, a revival of Beatles' music performed with an orchestra of Turkish instruments, at the Istanbul Lütfi Kırdar Convention and Exhibition Center, İstanbul. The group played the same work when they performed at the 1999 Beatles Festival held in Liverpool, England.

Fuat Güner is the composer of several film scores and has performed as an actor on stage and in one movie.

== Discography ==
=== Solo albums ===
- Aziz Fuat Güner (1999)
- Dinleyene Aşk Olsun (2010)

=== As guest artist ===
- Dünya Benim (2001) - Demir Demirkan (Aşk Var Ya)
- Sihirbaz (2009) - Burcu Güneş (Ateş Ve Suyun Aşkı)
- Göğe Selam (2011) - Kurtalan Ekspres (Can Bedenden Çıkmayınca)

=== Collaborative albums ===
==== Mazhar-Fuat ====
- Türküz Türkü Çağırırız (1973)

==== İpucu Beşlisi ====
- Heyecanlı / Hop Otur Hop Kalk (1976)

== Filmography ==
=== Film score composer ===
- Arkadaşım Şeytan, 1988
- Robert'in Filmi (Robert's Movie), 1990
- Aşk Ölümen Soğuktur, 1994
- Ölümsüz Karanfiller, 1995
- Koltuk Sevdası, 2001
- Çekirdek Aile, 2002

=== Actor ===
- Koltuk Sevdası, 2001
- Tehlikeyle Flört, 2015
