= Moda, Kadıköy =

Moda
- Locality
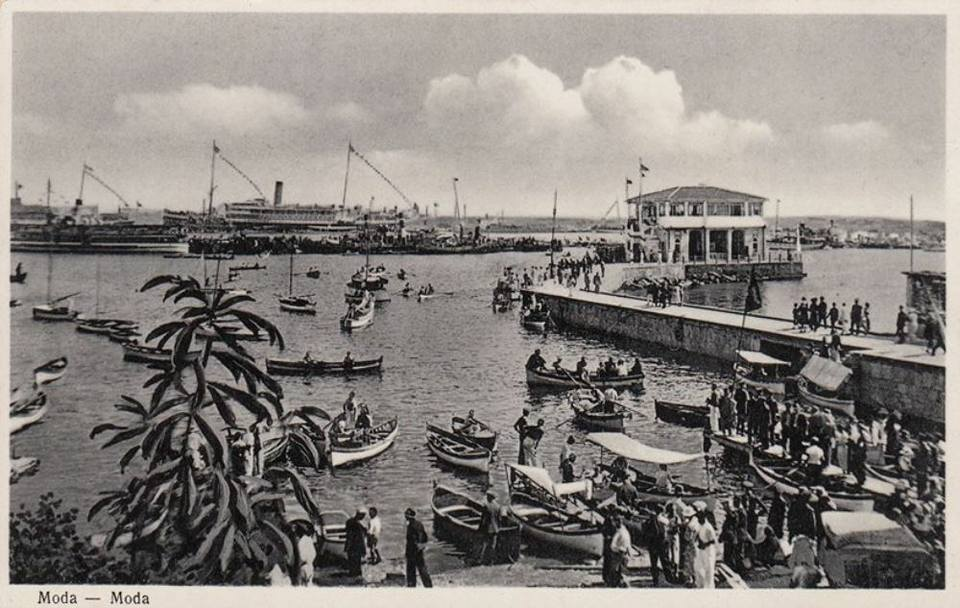
- Moda Pier

- Location within Istanbul
- Coordinates: 40.9800077°N 29.0228307°E
- Country: Turkey
- Region: Marmara
- Province: Istanbul
- District: Kadıköy
- Time zone: UTC+3 (TRT)
- Postal code: 34710
- Area code: 0216

Moda is a quarter in Kadıköy, Istanbul, Turkey. It is located on a peninsula between the center of Kadıköy and the Kurbağalıdere creek on the Anatolian part of Istanbul. The place became an outstanding residential area only after the 1870s, when wealthy non-Muslims settled down there by building their own mansions.

It is a multi-cultural place with Armenian, Greek and Anglican church buildings, Georgian art house, theatres, French Lycée Saint-Joseph (1870) Kadıköy Anatolian High School (1955), old curiosity shops, fish and international food restaurants.

Moda is served by the 2003-established Kadıköy-Moda Nostalgia Tram line.

Notable buildings and structures in Moda are:

- Süreyya Opera House, 1927-opened opera house,
- Moda Marine Club (1935),
- Moda Pier, 1917-built, 2022-restored passenger ferry pier.

Historic mansions

- Agah Bey Mansion,
- Antipa Mansion,
- Bursalı Riza Bey Mansion,
- Dowson Mansion,
- Mahmut Ata Bey Mansion,
- Cemil Cem Mansion,
- Fredrichi Mansion,
- Fürstenberger Mansion,
- Cemal Kutay Mansion,
- Lorando Mansion,
- Arif Sarıca Mansion, a 1903-built mansion, residence of concert pianist Ayşegül Sarıca,
- Şevket Salih Soysal Mansion,
- Mahmut Muhtar Pasha Mansion,
- Reşit Pasha Mansion,
- Tubini Mansion
- Whittall Mansion, a 1900 built mansion, which was home to rock musician Barış Manço, and is a historic house museum today,

== Gallery ==
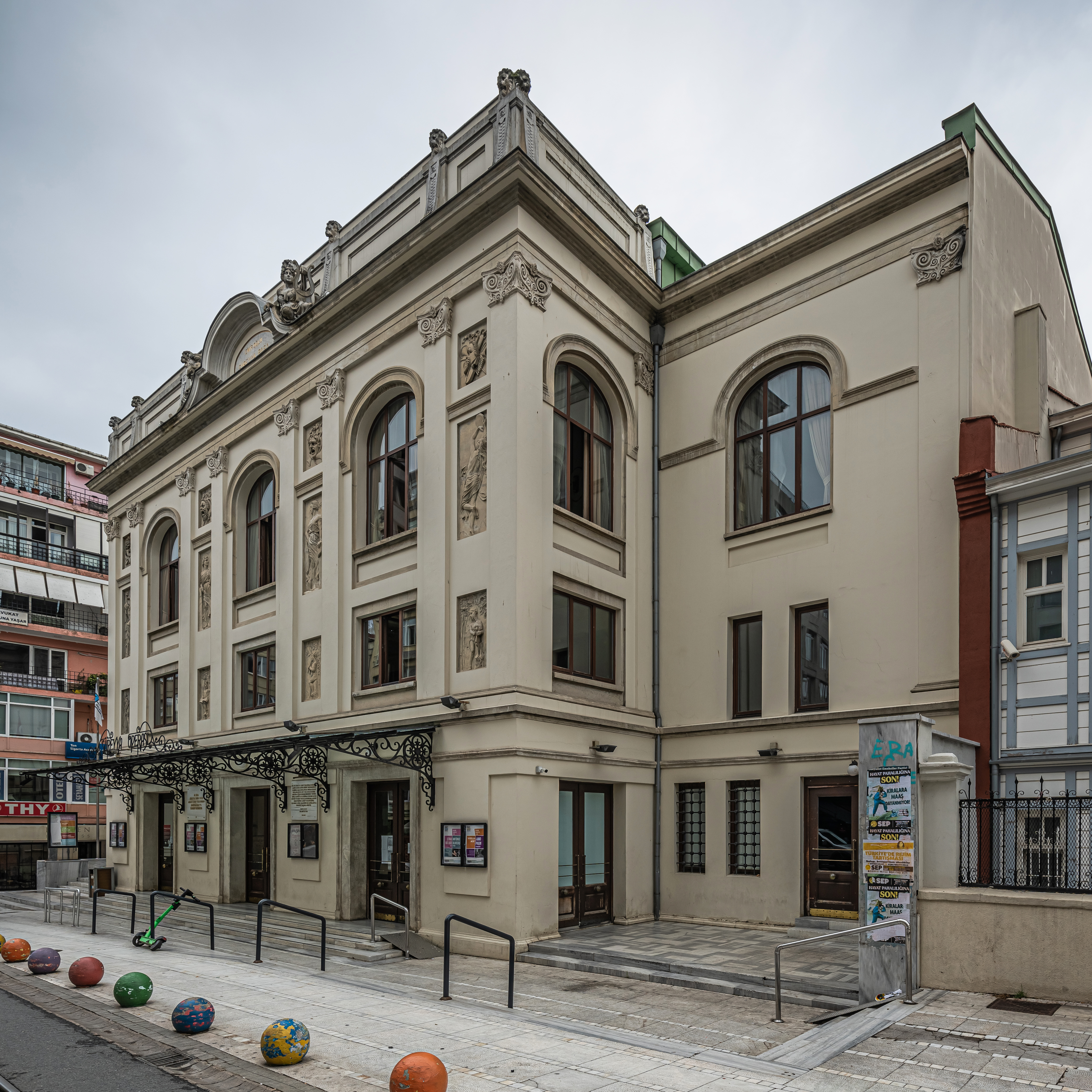
Süreyya Opera House

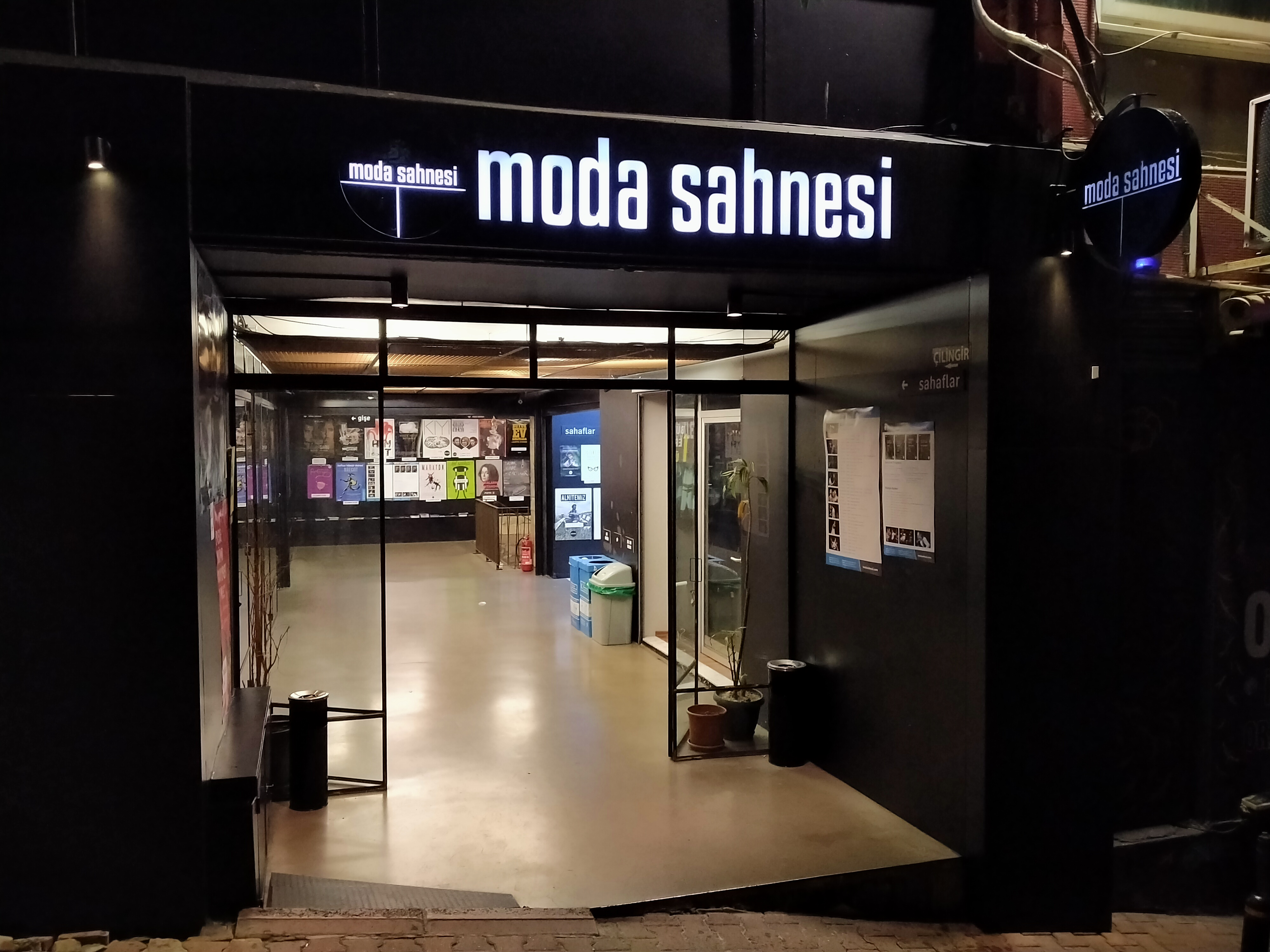
Moda Stage

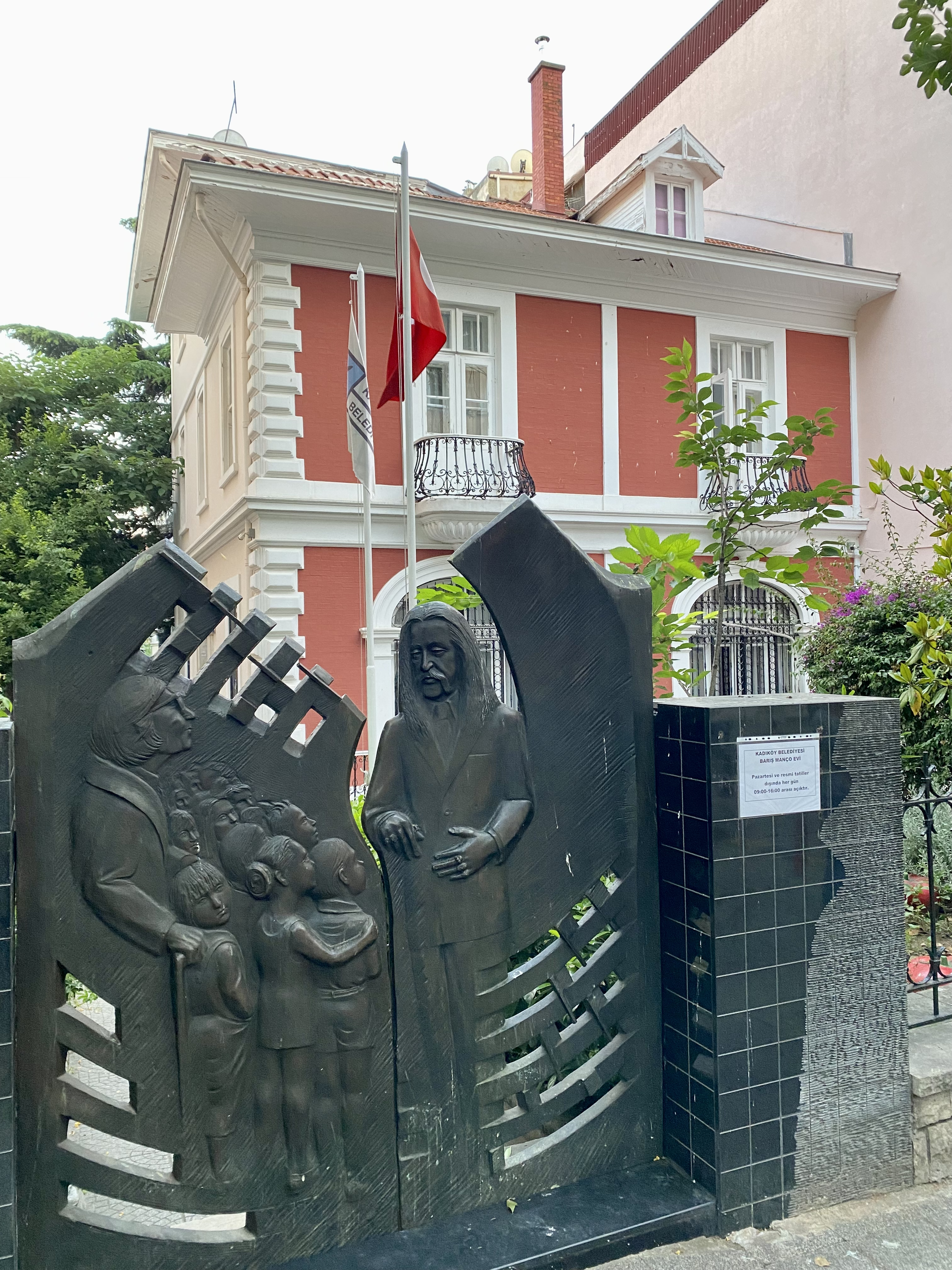
Barış Manço monument in front of the Whittall Mansion, today a historic house museum

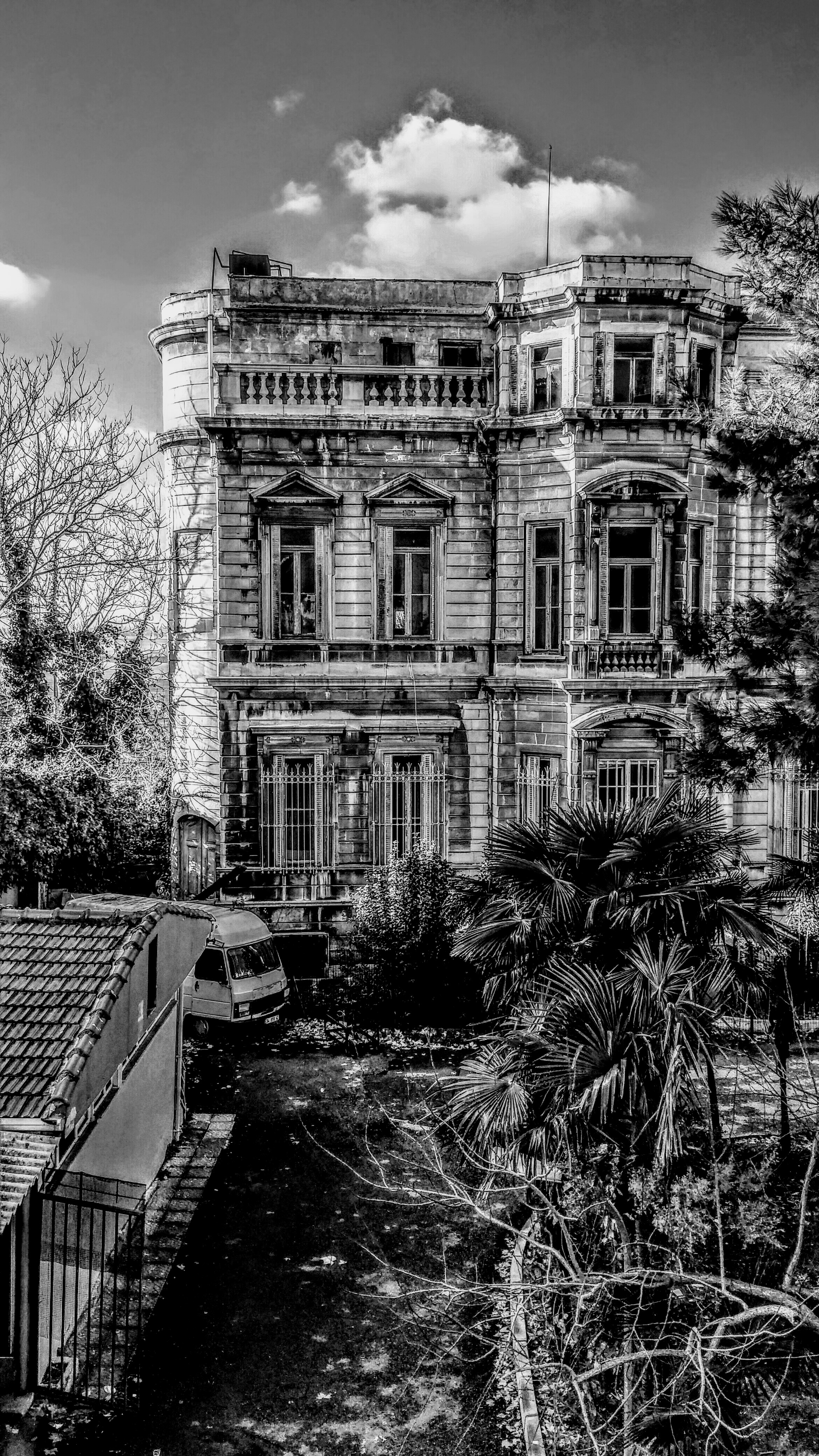
Mahmud Muhtar Pasha mansion

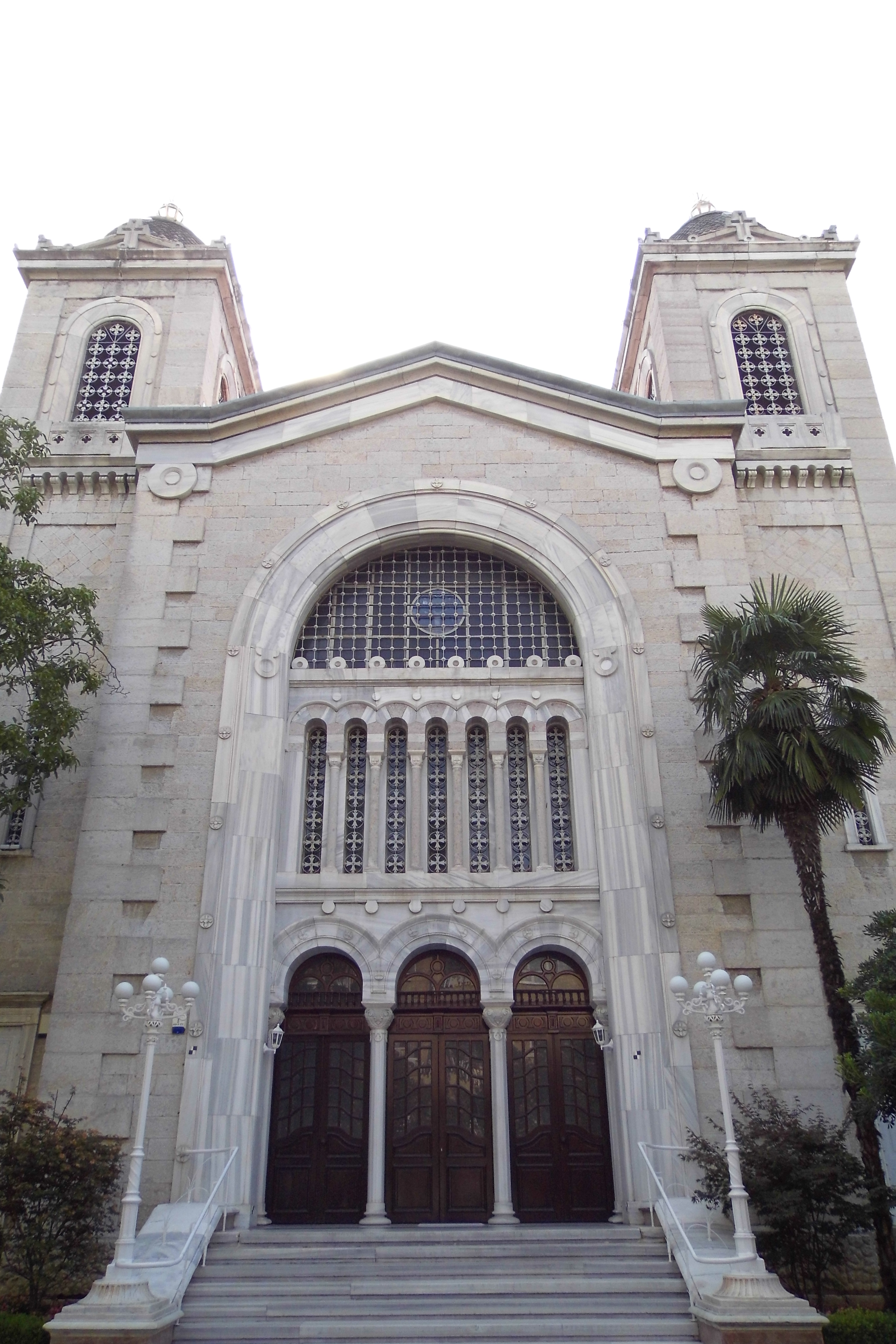
Hagia Triada Greek Orthodox Church

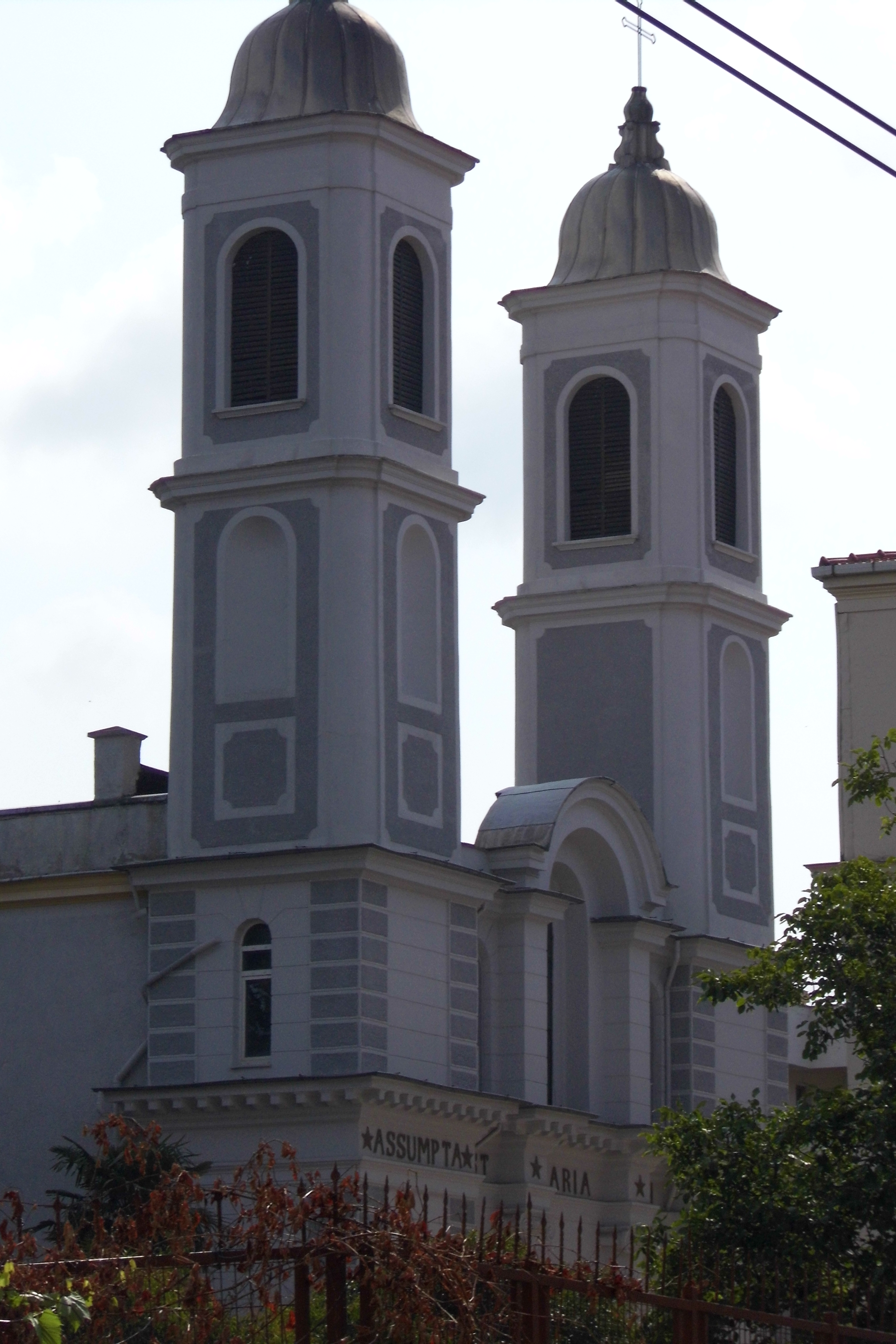
Église Notre-Dame de l'Assomption (Roman Catholic)

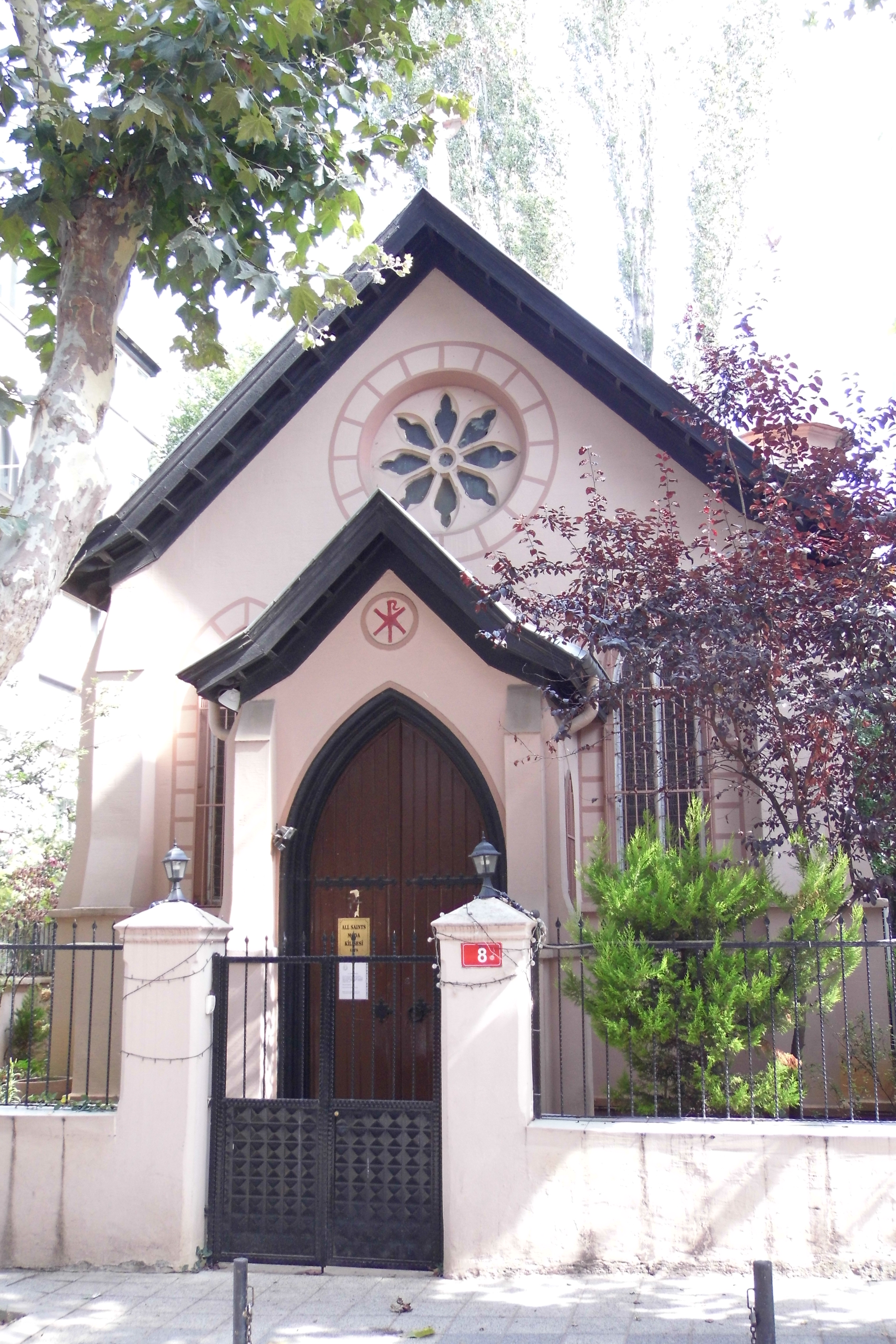
All Saints Moda Church (Anglican)

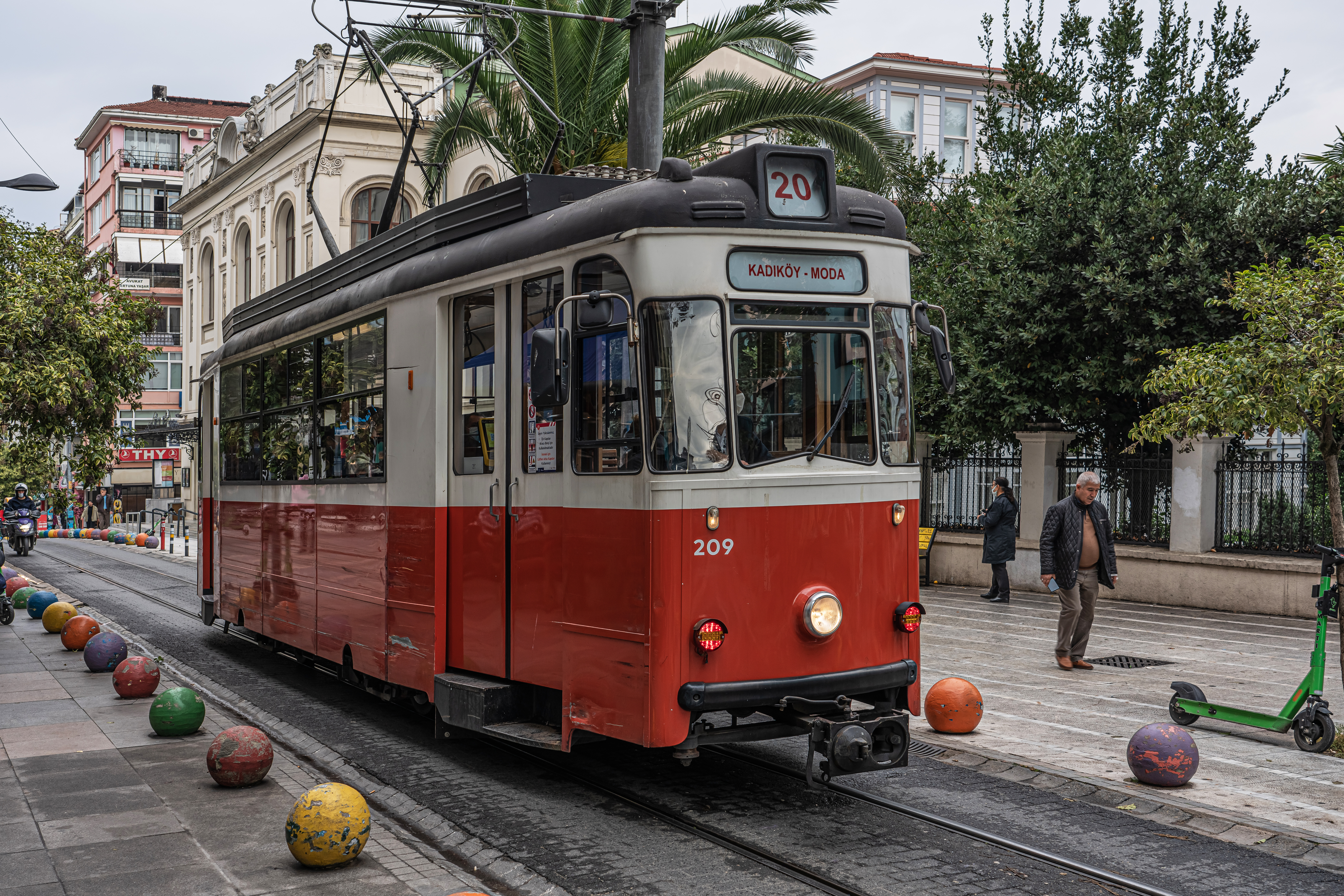
Kadıköy-Moda Nostalgia Tram

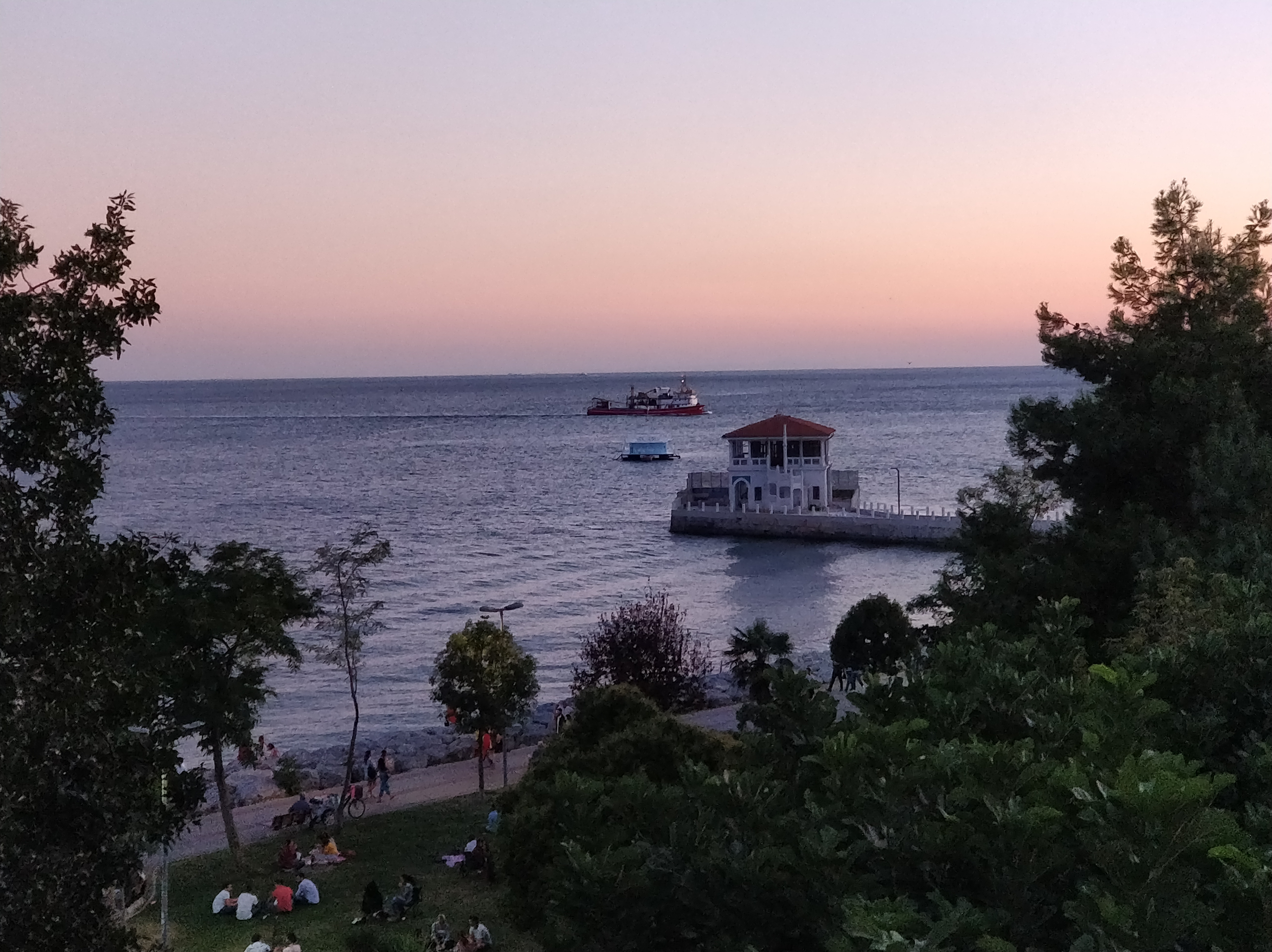
Moda Pier
