= Atherton Hotel at Oklahoma State University =

Historic hotel

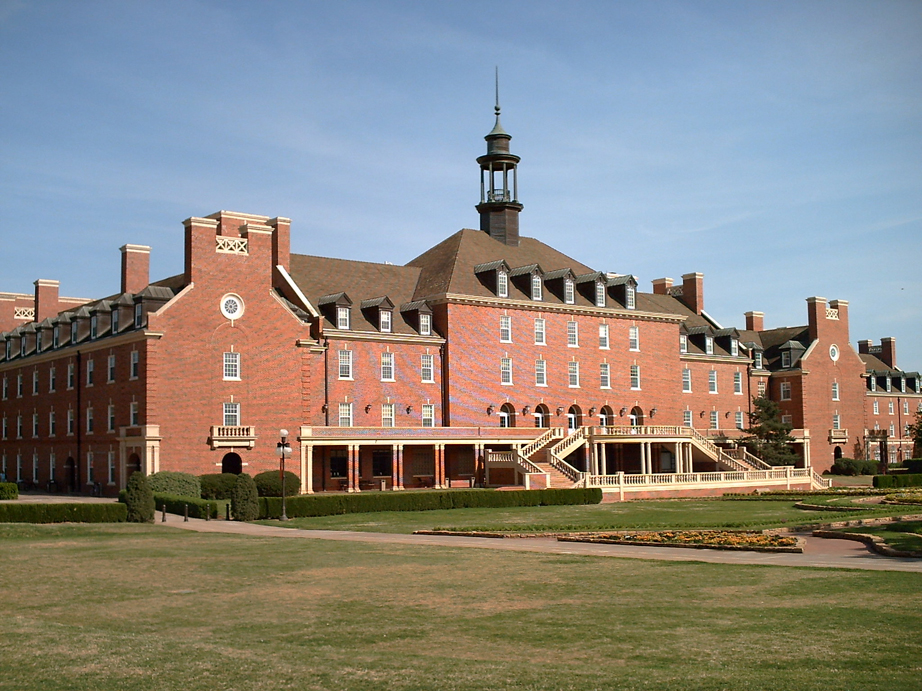
- OSU Student Union, including hotel and more, asserted to be the largest Student Union in the world

- Location within Oklahoma

General information
- Location: Oklahoma State University, Stillwater, Oklahoma
- Coordinates: 36.120469°N 97.068767°W
- Completed: 1950

The Atherton Hotel at Oklahoma State University, in Stillwater, Oklahoma, originally the Union Club, was built in 1950.

It is Georgian in style. It is run by Oklahoma State University's School of Hotel and Restaurant Administration.

According to the hotel's website, it was termed the "Waldorf of the West" when it opened in 1950, and it "was the first purpose-built hotel located in a university Student Union." It was built with 81 guest rooms and suites, and featured "an automatic elevator service, circulating ice water system, and adjacent parking".

The hotel was renovated "from lobby to roof" during 2001 to 2004, and was reopened as "The Atherton Hotel at OSU" in honor of Bill Atherton, an OSU graduate who was the major donor and otherwise led in fundraising for the restoration.

The Ranchers Club restaurant within the hotel was opened in 2005. The hotel was listed on the National Registry of the Historic Hotels of America in 2005.

In 2014, a further renovation began "of the hotel's interior space took it from 81 to 69 guestrooms, a move that underscored the intention to operate a boutique-style, full-service hotel that would enhance both the campus and the academic initiatives of its School of Hotel and Restaurant Administration." That was identified as a $20 million project when it was nearing completion in February 2016.

== Guests ==
Guests have included U.S. Presidents Harry S. Truman, Gerald Ford, Jimmy Carter, Ronald Reagan, and George H. W. Bush. Other visitors were: Bob Hope, Vincent Price, Will Rogers Jr., Faith Hill, Sinbad, Joe Lieberman, Wilt Chamberlain, Coretta Scott King, Haile Selassie, Nolan Ryan, Shaquille O'Neal, Woody Harrelson, and Bill Nye.
