= Kurtalan Ekspres =

- Origin: Turkey
- Genres: Anatolian rock, rock and roll
- Years active: 1972-present
- Members: Ahmet Güvenç; Tolga Akyurt; Selim Işık; Koray Alarslan; Taha Purcafer
- Past members: Barış Manço; Bahadır Akkuzu; Mithat Danışan

Kurtalan Ekspres is a Turkish Anatolian rock band that has worked with several famous lead singers, such as Cem Karaca, Cahit Berkay, Barış Manço. The band takes its name from a train named Kurtalan Express, which travels between Kurtalan and Haydarpaşa. Kurtalan Ekspres was founded by Barış Manço in 1971, and initially included Murat Ses, Erdinç Avcı, Fuat Güner, Celal Güven, Özkan Uğur and Ali Serdar. In the late-1970s Bahadır Akkuzu joined the group as the lead guitarist. After Barış Manço's death in 1999, the band began working with Cem Karaca. After Cem Karaca's death in 2004, Bahadır Akkuzu took over the vocals, and later died of a heart attack in 2009.

The band took part as the orchestra of the programmes Adam Olacak Çocuk and 4×21 Doludizgin, which Manço used to present.

== History ==
Kurtalan Ekspres was formed in 1972 by Barış Manço to accompany him on records and at concerts. The band's first line-up consisted of drummer Nur Moray and percussionist Celal Güven, who would stay as a member of the band for many years; drummer Ali Serdar and guitarist Fuat Güner, who had worked with Manço in Kaygısızlar; bass guitarist Özkan Uğur and flutist Erdinç Avcı. The band had a change of members before it could even produce a record. Their first 45-rpm was "Ölüm Allah'ın Emri / Gamzedeyim Deva Bulmam" released in 1972.

== Members ==
Drums: Ali Serdar (1971), Nur Moray (1971-1976), Hüdai Özgüder (1971-1972), Engin Yörükoğlu (1972-1974, deceased in 2010), Caner Bora (1974-1988) Hüseyin Cebeci (1988-1995), Recep Işık (1987-1999), Cihangir Akkuzu (1995-)

Bass Guitar: Özkan Uğur (1971, 1972-1974, 1976), Mithat Danışan (1971-1972, 1974-1976), Ahmet Güvenç (1976-1988, 1991-)

Tumba: Celal Güven (1971-1988)

Electric Guitar: Fuat Güner (1971-1972, 1978), Ohannes Kemer (1971-1974, 1975, 1976-1977, deceased in 2012), Nezih Cihanoğlu (1972), Kirkor Kalender (1972), Mustafa Sarışın (1974), Nurhan Özcan (1974), Samim Boztaş (1975), Fehimen Uğurdemir (1976, 1980), Özkan Uğur (1978-1985), Bahadır Akkuzu (1978-2009, deceased in 2009)

Flute: Erdinç Avcı (1971-1972), Oktay Aldoğan (1974-1982, deceased in 2014), Serdar Ertürk (1980-1988), Serdar Akatlar (1980-1983)

Keyboard: Murat Ses (1972-1974), Yalçın Gürbüz (1975), Kılıç Danışman (1976-1977, 1978-1980), Ömür Gidel (1978-1985), Nejat Tekdal (1980-1982), Jean Jacques Falaise (1985-1986), Ufuk Yıldırım (1988-1996), Garo Mafyan (1988-1992), Elif Turhan (1991), Eser Taşkıran (1995-)

== Albums ==
=== Solo ===
- 3552 (2003)
- Göğe Selam (2011)
- Göğe Selam II (2014)

=== Barış Manço & Kurtalan Ekspres ===
- Yeni Bir Gün (1979)
- Sözüm Meclisten Dışarı (1981)
- Estağfurullah... Ne Haddimize! (1983)
