= Whittall Mansion, Moda =

Ottoman-era mansion in Istanbul, Turkey

Whittall Mansion
- Whittall Köşkü
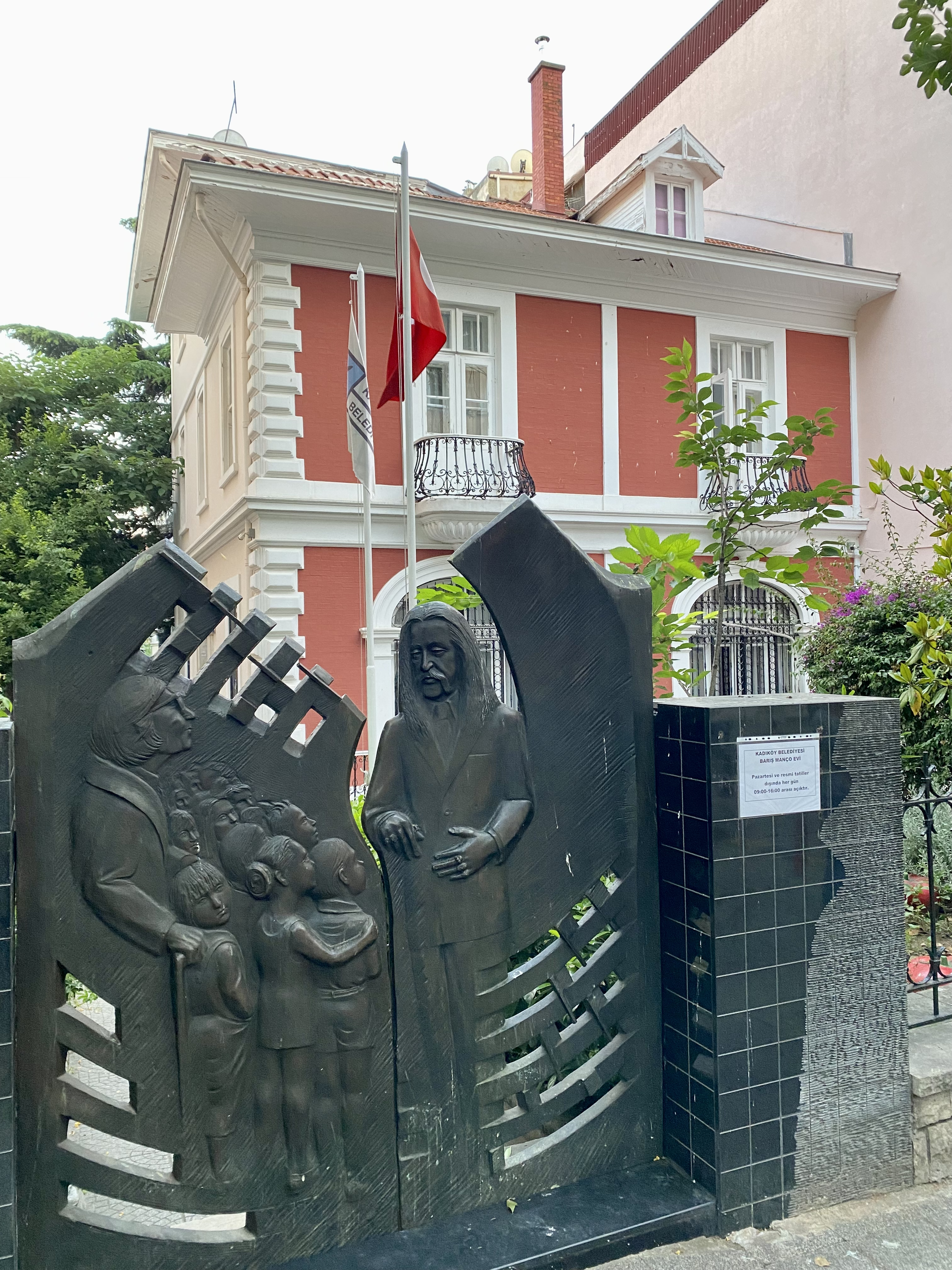
- Whittall Mansion, now the Barış Manço House Museum
- Interactive map of the Whittall Mansion area

General information
- Location: Kadıköy, Yusuf Kamil Paşa St., Moda, Kadıköy, Istanbul, Turkey
- Coordinates: 40.98212°N 29.02143°E
- Construction started: 1895
- Completed: 1900; 126 years ago

Design and construction
- Architect: Pape

Whittall Mansion (Turkish: Whittall Köşkü) is an Ottoman-era mansion in Istanbul, Turkey, built in 1900. Today, it is a historic house museum dedicated to rock musician Barış Manço (1943–1999).

== Background ==
James William Whittall, later Sir William Whittall, was a British businessman, whose ancestors settled in Smyrna, today İzmir, in 1809. He married fellow Anglo-Ottoman Edith Anne Barker in Buca, Smyrna on 9 April 1862. His wife gave birth to four children, Edith Mary, Ethel Marianne, Frederick Edwin and Linda Frances.

After working with his two brothers in the family-owned firm C. Whittall and Co. in Smyrna, he founded his own company in Constantinople, today Istanbul, in 1873.

== Mansion ==
The Whittall Mansion is located on Yusuf Kamil Paşa St. in the Moda quarter of Kadıköy district in Istanbul, Turkey. In 1870, J.W. Whittall purchased a large property in Moda, Kadıköy stretching on a hillside between Moda Avenue and the sea shore of the Marmara Sea. He built a mansion for his grown-up family, designed by Ottoman Greek Pape between 1895 and 1900. The mansion was dubbed the "Tower House" ("Kule Ev"). He bestowed a wooden house at the premises to his son Frederick Edwin and daughter-in-law Helen, née La Fontaine. He built houses of all sizes on the property for his children.

Soldier and civil servant Mahmud Muhtar Pasha fled to the Whittall mansion for shelter in April 1909 amidst the chaos of the 31 March Incident; the house was briefly surrounded by Ottoman troops.

The Whittall Mansion has two stories and an attic. The first floor features a long hall stretching to the terrace. The hall was flanked by living rooms. One of the rooms, having a charcoal-burning stove and decorated as an "Oriental Room", belonged to Helen's grandmother Lilly, who played pinochle there. There were about six Aubusson tapestries hanging on the walls. The tapestries were bought by Enver Pasha during World War I, and holes were punched in the middle to allow stove pipes to go through, for stoves to warm wounded Turkish soldiers in the hospital. On the second floor were the sleeping rooms. The terrace overlooked the lower garden with some magnolia trees and a small jetty on the sea shore, where J.W. Whittall moored sailboats. The hillside garden was dubbed "Whittall Park".

== History ==
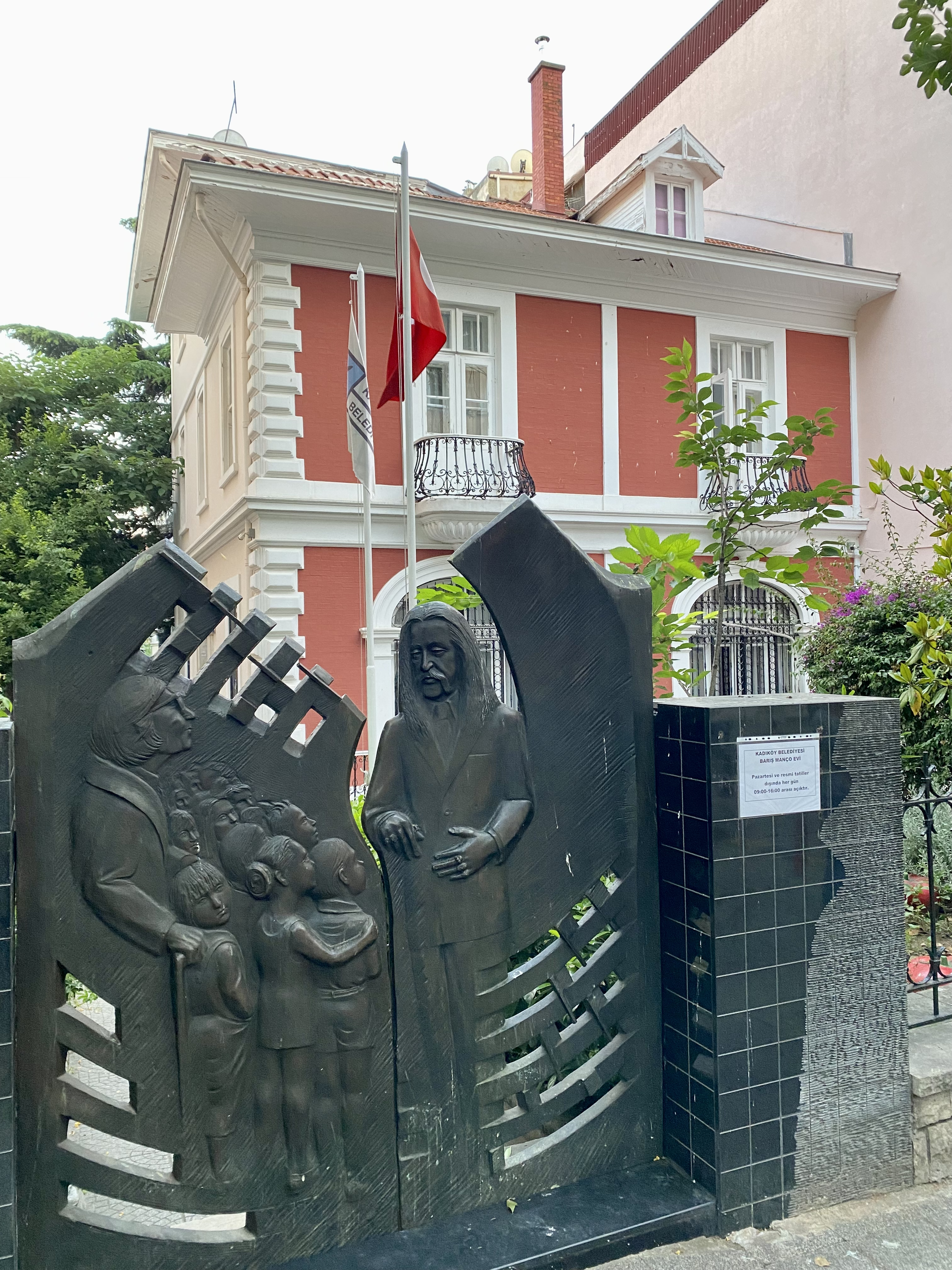
Barış Manço Monument in front of the Whittall Mansion, today "Barış Manço House" as a historic house museum.

The mansion changed ownership many times. In 1965, fifth generation family member John Whittall regained possession of the mansion. In 1984, rock musician Barış Manço (1943 - 1999) purchased it. After Manço's death, the mansion, where he had lived with his wife Lale and sons Doğukan Hazar and Batıkan Zorbey and produced his works, was restored and turned into a museum focused on his life. (Turkish: Barış Manço Evi). It was opened to the public on 9 June 2010.

== See also ==
- Edward Whittall
