= Rose pink =

Reddish purple color

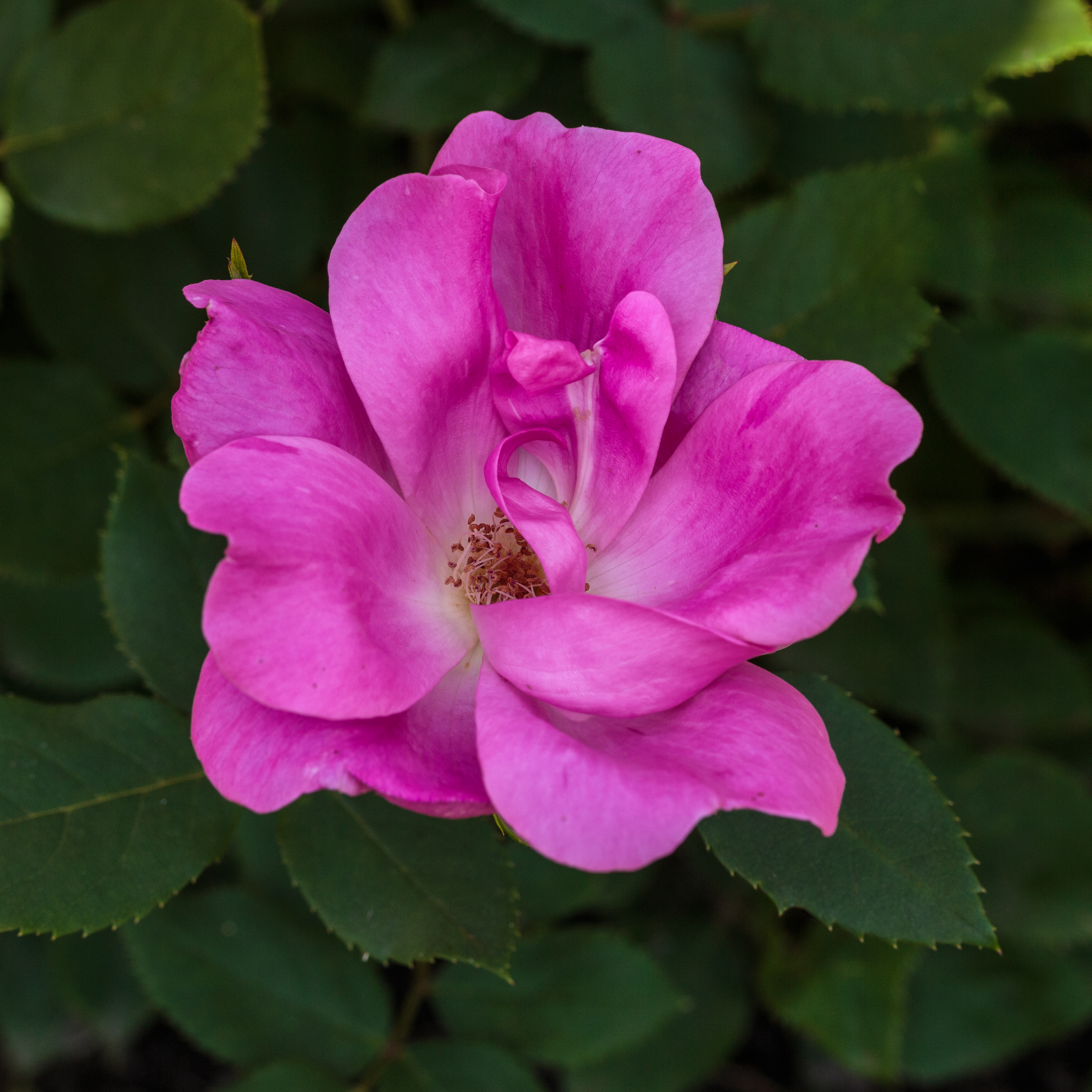
- 'Pink Knock Out' rose cultivar

Color coordinates
- Hex triplet: #FF66CC
- sRGB^{B} (r, g, b): (255, 102, 204)
- HSV (h, s, v): (320°, 60%, 100%)
- CIELCh_{uv} (L, C, h): (66, 97, 331°)
- Source: ColorHexa
- ISCC–NBS descriptor: Vivid reddish purple
- B: Normalized to [0–255] (byte)

Rose pink is a reddish purple color. The first recorded use of rose pink as a color name in English was in 1760.
