= Access =

Access may refer to:

== Companies and organizations ==
- ACCESS (Australia), an Australian youth network
- Access (credit card), a former credit card in the United Kingdom
- Access Co., a Japanese software company
- Access International Advisors, a hedge fund
- AirCraft Casualty Emotional Support Services
- Arab Community Center for Economic and Social Services
- Access, the Alphabet division containing Google Fiber
- Access, the Southwest Ohio Regional Transit Authority's paratransit service

== Sailing ==
- Access 2.3, a sailing keelboat
- Access 303, a sailing keelboat
- Access Liberty, a sailing keelboat

== Television ==
- Access Hollywood, formerly Access, an American entertainment newsmagazine
- Access (British TV programme), a British entertainment television programme
- Access (Canadian TV series), a Canadian television series (1974–1982)
- Access TV, a former Canadian educational television channel (1973–2011)
- Access Television Network, an American infomercial channel
- "Access" (The West Wing), an episode of The West Wing

== Other uses ==
- Access (comics), a character from Amalgam Comics
- Access (EP), a 2022 EP by Acid Angel from Asia
- Access (group), a Japanese pop duo
- "Access" (song), a 2018 song by Martin Garrix
- Access 5, a NASA program
- Access Linux Platform, an operating system for mobile devices
- Access network, the process of signing onto a network
- Access Peak, a mountain in New Zealand
- Access Virus, a German musical device
- Experimental Assembly of Structures in EVA and Assembly Concept for Construction of Erectable Space Structures (EASE and ACCESS), a pair of space shuttle flight experiments
- Internet access, the hardware and connections needed to use the internet
- Microsoft Access, a database program which is part of the Office suite

== See also ==
- Accessibility
- AccessNow.org, a U.S.-based non-profit organization
- Advanced Civil Speed Enforcement System (ACSES)
- Axes (disambiguation)
- Axess (disambiguation)
- Axxess (disambiguation)
- Computer data storage
- Coverage (disambiguation)
- File system permissions
- Public, educational, and government access, American public, educational and government (PEG) access cable TV channels
