= History of the University of Texas at Arlington (1917–1965) =

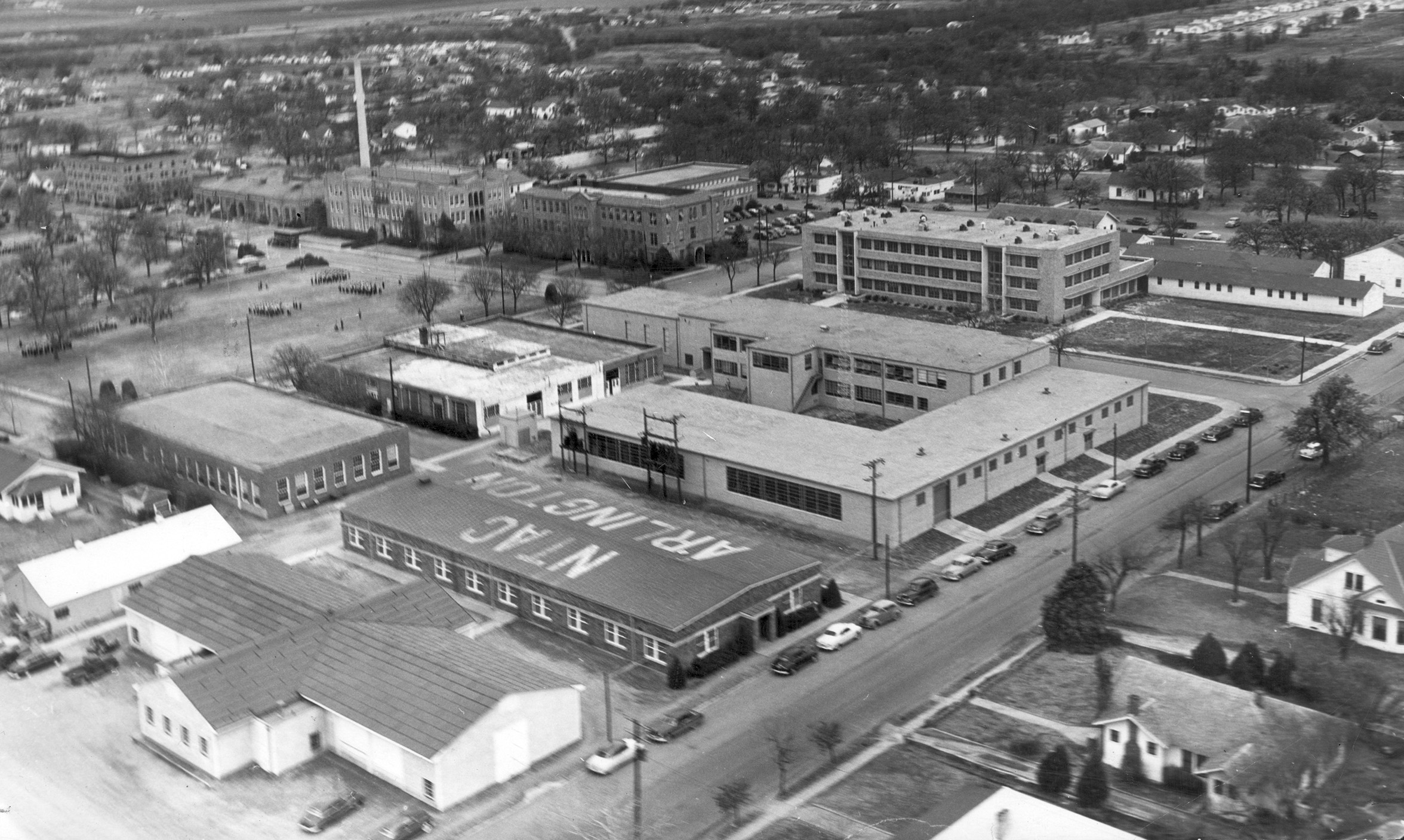
Aerial view of the Arlington State College campus, circa 1950–51

From 1917 to 1965, what is now the University of Texas at Arlington was a member of the Texas A&M University System. In March 1917, it was organized as Grubbs Vocational College (GVC), a junior college that was a branch campus of the Agricultural and Mechanical College of Texas (AMC), which later became Texas A&M University. Open only to white students, the curriculum at GVC centered around the agricultural, industrial, and mechanical trades.

In May 1923, the college was renamed North Texas Agricultural College (NTAC) due to the rapid expansion of its liberal arts curriculum, the fact that it was no longer just a vocational institution, and quickly growing enrollment. During the Great Depression and World War II, NTAC survived major declines in enrollment and multiple attempts by the state government to close it. Beginning in 1937, there was a movement in Arlington to elevate NTAC to four-year college status, but this goal would not be realized for more than two decades. Student life during the NTAC era was vibrant, although there was a cultural split between the students who lived on campus and those who commuted for classes.

In September 1949, the college was renamed Arlington State College (ASC), in part because agriculture was no longer a major course of study. During the 1950s, it was the largest state junior college in the Southwest, and it grew to be the 5th largest state-supported college or university in Texas by 1959. During the 1950s, enrollment in courses in the arts and sciences, business, and engineering grew substantially. The college ended its agriculture program altogether in 1957. Between 1950 and 1965, ASC conducted a major building campaign that built 18 new buildings on campus for $14.225 million. On April 27, 1959, Texas governor Price Daniel signed a bill making ASC a four-year college. After the addition of junior-level courses in fall 1959 and senior-level courses in fall 1960, ASC awarded its first 23 bachelor's degrees in 1961.

In response to a legal challenge to its segregationist admissions policy, ASC announced its racial integration in July 1962 and admitted its first African American students in September. ASC experienced growing disillusionment with the Texas A&M University System. ASC supporters believed that Texas A&M subjugated ASC's interests, was too rigid in administrative style, and did not invest adequately in the Arlington college, as it was growing quickly. ASC lobbied for separation from A&M, and ultimately, admission into the University of Texas System, which occurred when Texas governor John Connally signed Senate Bill 401 into law on April 23, 1965. Athletics at ASC were dominated by the football team, which won back-to-back Junior Rose Bowls in 1956 and 1957, bringing the college national recognition for the first time. ASC also created a men's swimming program during the mid-1960s that featured Doug Russell, a collegiate national champion who would go on to win a gold medal at the 1968 Summer Olympics.

== Grubbs Vocational College (1917–1923) ==
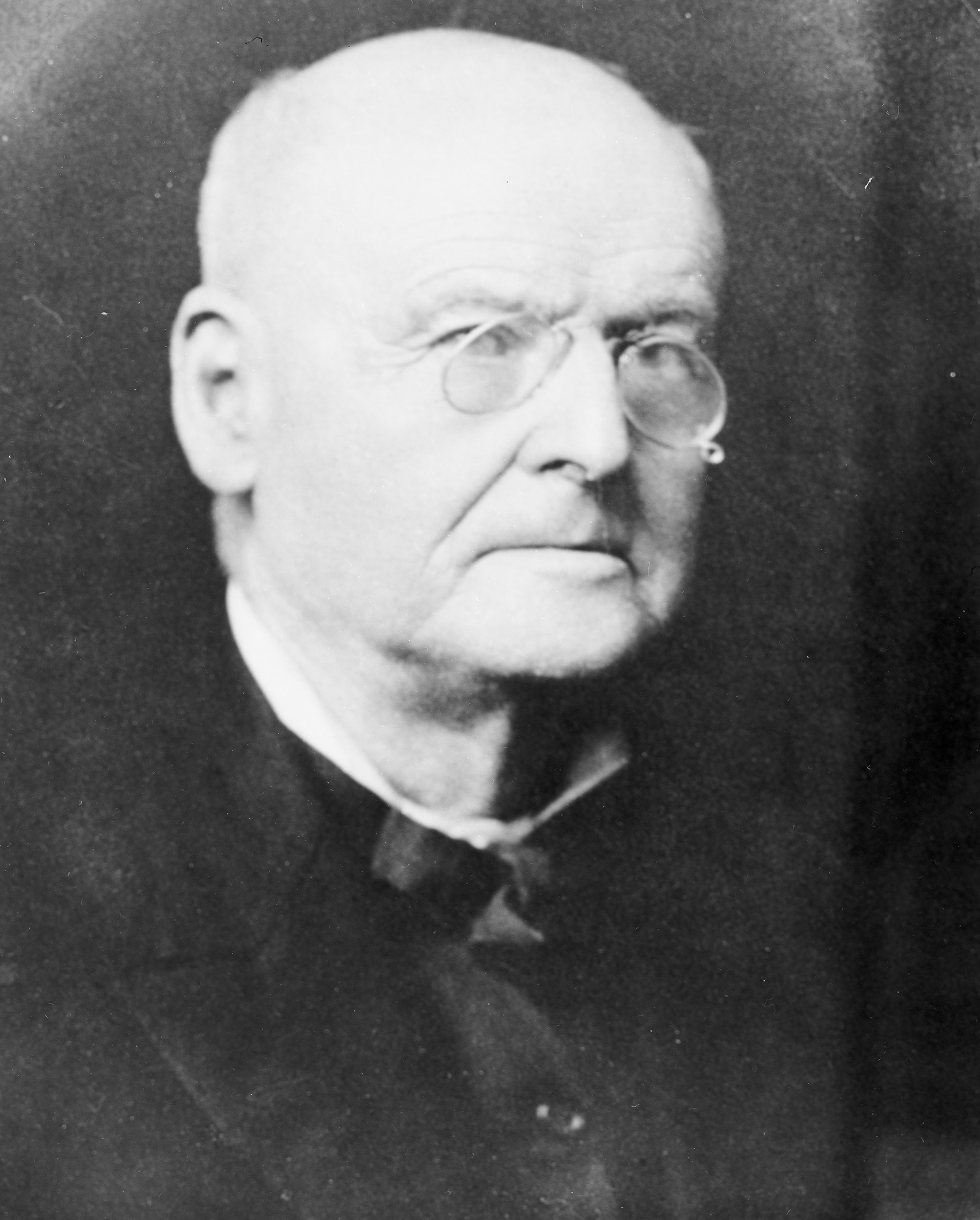
Vincent W. Grubbs, namesake of Grubbs Vocational College

Grubbs Vocational College (GVC) was organized as a junior college in March 1917. It was established as a branch campus of the Agricultural and Mechanical College of Texas (AMC), which later became Texas A&M University. The namesake of GVC was Vincent W. Grubbs, a judge from Greenville who was instrumental in the creation of the college. Grubbs was a strong supporter of the state's agricultural, industrial, and mechanical schools, which he believed provided a critical education "for the poor boys and girls of Texas". He was convinced that the existing system of higher education in the state was unfair to poor and rural children, particularly those growing up on farms. Grubbs himself was a native of Kentucky who moved to Texas during his childhood, eventually becoming a lawyer and a newspaper contributor and co-owner. In 1902, he was instrumental in the establishment of the College of Industrial Arts (later renamed Texas Woman's University) in Denton.

In spring 1917, Grubbs lobbied the 35th legislative session in Austin to secure the establishment of what was to become GVC through House Bill 656 and Senate Bill 449. While he was at the capitol, his friend A. D. Jackson recommended the name "Grubbs Vocational College" for the school. On March 20, the parallel bills were passed by both the Texas Senate and House of Representatives, and on March 25 Texas governor James E. Ferguson signed them into law. The bills defined the mission of GVC to be "the education of white boys and girls" in Texas. They also established John Tarleton Agricultural College (JTAC) in Stephenville, likewise as part of the AMC system.

GVC was established with its own advisory "local board of managers", but this body was placed under the direction and ultimate authority of the board of directors at AMC in College Station. Grubbs himself was never selected as dean of GVC, a snub that caused him lasting resentment. From its establishment in 1917 through 1925 (after the college was renamed), Myron L. Williams served as the dean of GVC. He was a colleague and friend of AMC president William Bizzell, and he was given the title of dean instead of president because GVC was a branch campus of the school in College Station. Williams was a native of Oenaville, Texas, who was educated at Sam Houston Normal Institute, the University of Texas at Austin, and Columbia University. He had teaching experience in Amarillo, Clarendon, and Miami as well as at the College of Industrial Arts in Denton.

The curriculum at GVC centered around the agricultural, industrial, and mechanical trades. Classes in bookkeeping, commercial law, home economics, and stenography were also taught. The college provided its students with two years of secondary education and two years of college-level education. When GVC first opened, it offered college-level agricultural courses for male students and household arts courses for female students. The curriculum closely resembled that at AMC so that male students could easily transfer to College Station. Students had to be 14 years of age in order to enroll.

The college's cadet program was obligatory for all male students, and it comprised one battalion with four companies and eight platoons. In 1918, GVC established its Student Army Training Corps (SATC), which inducted students into the United States Army as privates. A total of 62 male GVC students participated in the SATC, although none saw active duty in Europe before Armistice Day in November 1918. The campus more broadly supported the war effort by donating to the American Red Cross and United War Work Fund, purchasing Liberty bonds and war savings stamps, and conserving food. In 1919–20, GVC created an entire program for disabled soldiers returning from World War I. In fall 1921, the college established its Reserve Officers' Training Corps (ROTC), to which the War Department assigned Captain Carl A. Bishop and Lieutenant L. W. Caine. Captain Bishop also established a rifle team at GVC.

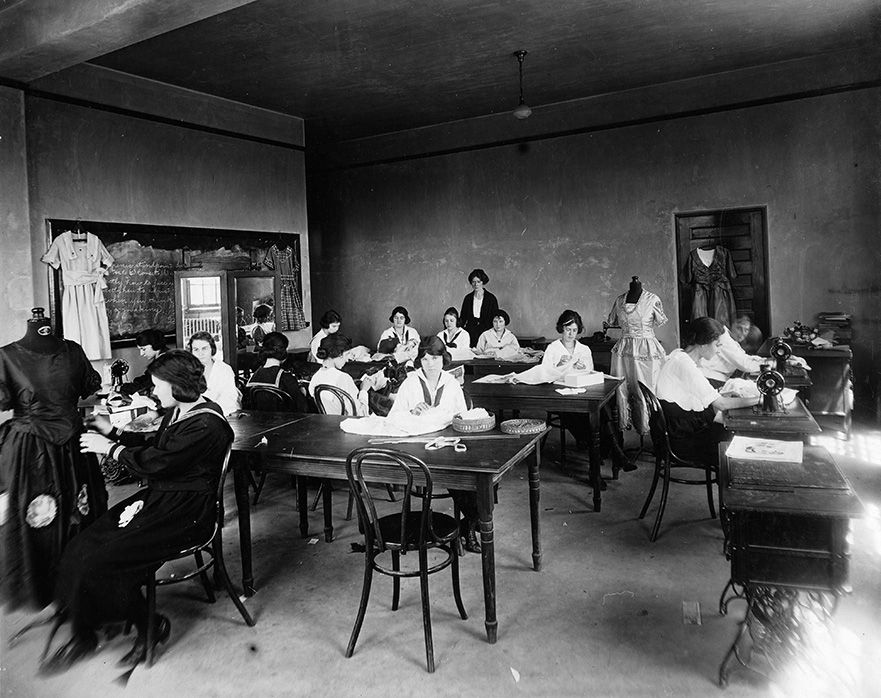
Sewing laboratory at GVC, undated

Female students had to sew their own gingham dresses as part of their uniform while all students had to wear their uniforms while on campus and boarding students had to wear their uniforms at all times. Female students who lived on campus also had to cook their own meals and clean their dormitory. Students were given demerits for being out of uniform, being tardy to class, or breaking any of GVC's conduct rules. In 1919, GVC student Rosemary Ribbon complained that "you get demerits for everything you do and for everything you don't do".

In early 1918, GVC survived a proposal by the state's Central Legislative Investigating Committee to abolish it or terminate its college farm, which had been proposed largely due to the high cost of land in Arlington. While the proposal was not implemented, GVC responded to the threat by establishing automobile repair courses and additional commercial courses to diversify itself beyond an agricultural curriculum. GVC survived additional proposals by the state legislature to abolish it in 1921 and 1923.

At first, GVC did not charge its students tuition, while room and board cost students $20 per month and textbooks cost approximately $15–20 per year. Fees increased substantially by the early 1920s, with maintenance fees for a semester reaching as high as $86.40. Students could in live in dormitories on campus, at home, or in approved boarding houses, but by 1922 Dean Williams admitted that the dormitories were in poor condition and needed to be replaced.

During its first semester in 1917, the enrollment at GVC was just 66 students: 40 women and 26 men. Male enrollment was especially low due to American participation in World War I. During the 1918–19 academic year, enrollment grew to 192: 143 men and 49 women. By 1919–20, this number had grown to 444, with students representing 54 of the counties of Texas. During the 1920–21 academic year, GVC had 411 students, by 1921–22 it had 680, and by 1922–23 it had reached 808 students. In 1918, there were no graduates from GVC, while there were only eight in 1919 and five in 1920. The number of graduates grew slowly to 12 in 1921, 13 in 1922, and finally to 23 in 1923.

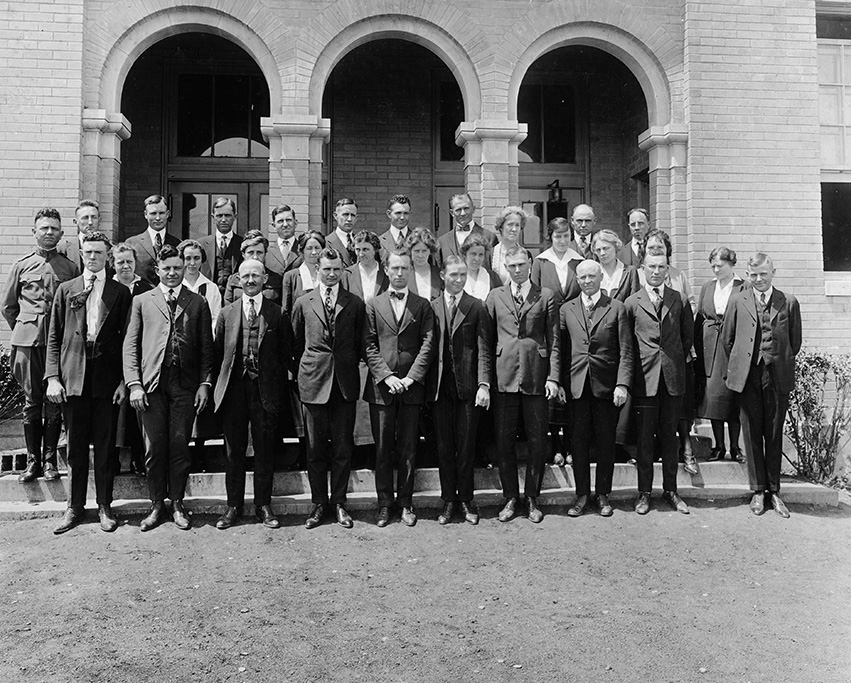
Group photograph of GVC faculty, undated

On its first day of classes in 1917, GVC had a faculty of 14 teachers. By 1920, this number doubled to 28. The faculty tended to be young and fairly inexperienced, and the college had difficulty retaining them due to its non-competitive salary scale. This problem was compounded by the state's 30% reduction in GVC's appropriations throughout its existence between 1917 and 1923, despite the substantial increase in the size of its student body. Nonetheless, state funding for GVC during this time is described by historian and author Gerald Saxon as "relatively stable", noting that it provided a "basic level of support".

By 1923, Dean Williams asked AMC to rename GVC, which had come to see the word "vocational" in its name as limiting to its future growth. Additionally, being named "Grubbs" seemed to incorrectly imply that it was a private school. In July 1923, the Texas Legislature changed the name of the school to North Texas Junior Agricultural College, which was soon officially shortened to North Texas Agricultural College (NTAC). By this point, Arlington's residents and leading citizens had demonstrated considerable support for the college. Saxon argues that, in 1923, "for the first time in the history" of the college, "the future looked bright".

=== Building development ===
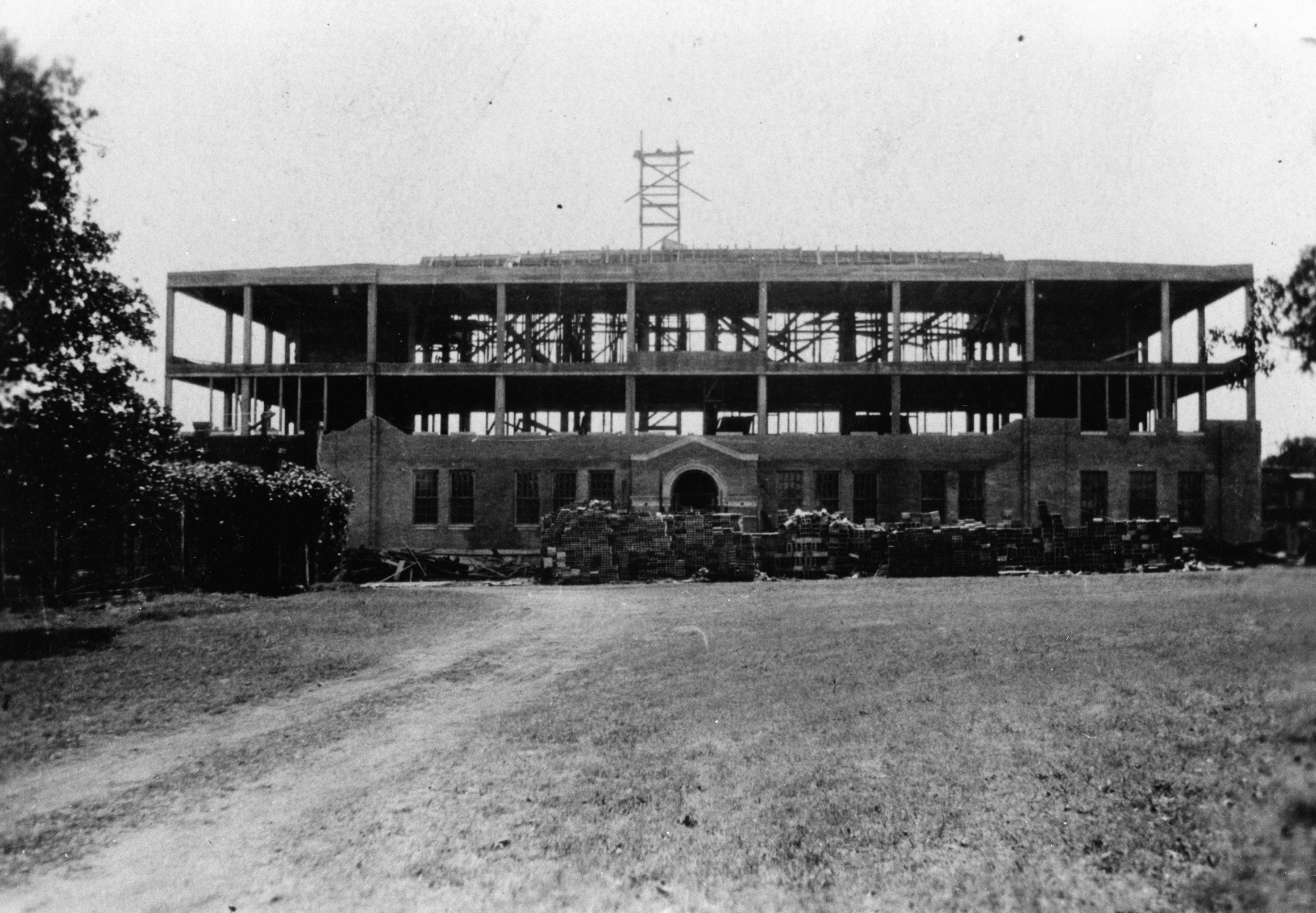
Construction of the Administration Building, circa 1918–19

GVC inherited the campus of the recently defunct Arlington Military Academy. It also purchased an additional 100 acres (40 ha) of farmland from James Fielder to create a demonstration farm. Fielder's land is where Maverick Stadium and the J. D. Wetsel Service Center were later constructed. Aside from Fielder's farmland, the GVC campus only comprised 12 acres (4.9 ha) in 1922. Upon arriving on campus in 1917, Dean Williams wrote that its condition was "badly neglected" and "in a state of decay". At the time, there were seven buildings in total: the academic building, two barracks, a women's dormitory, a mess hall, a gymnasium, and the dean's cottage.

In 1919, GVC completed the construction of its new Administration Building at the cost of $112,500. In addition to administrative offices, it also housed an auditorium, classrooms, laboratories, and a library. Later renamed Ransom Hall, it is still standing on campus. Dean Williams also constructed an automotive shop, a machine shop, and a mess hall during the 1919–20 academic year. In December 1922, five state legislators pledged their support for an unrealized building program at GVC that would have allocated $150,000 for a dormitory with a dining hall and $100,000 for a science building.

=== Student life ===
Male students at GVC could join the Star Literary or Wilsonian debating societies, the Glee Club, or the Young Men's Christian Association. Female students could choose from the Chorus Club, Gro-Voco Club, and the Roundup Club. The Dramatic Club was open to both male and female students. The Shorthorn, the student newspaper, began as a monthly magazine in April 1919 before becoming a weekly newspaper in 1922.

Students were required to attend chapel services three or four times per week, while dancing and smoking were both forbidden on campus during Dean Williams's tenure. Popular activities for GVC students included picnics and field trips, with destinations including Camp Bowie in Fort Worth, the Fort Worth Fat Stock Show, and the State Fair of Texas in Dallas. In 1995, Franklin Dowell, then the oldest living graduate of GVC, recalled playing French horn in the college band, writing for The Shorthorn, and going to see shows at the Majestic Theatre in Dallas before he graduated in 1921.

=== Athletics ===
GVC required its students, regardless of gender, to participate in one hour of physical exercise every day. The school sponsored a women's basketball team. Men could participate in baseball, basketball, football, tennis, and track and field. The school colors were blue and white and GVC teams were nicknamed the Grubbworms from 1917 until 1921, when the nickname was changed to Hornets. GVC intercollegiate athletics teams competed in the Texas Junior College Athletic Association.

== North Texas Agricultural College (1923–1949) ==
In May 1923, GVC was renamed North Texas Agricultural College (NTAC) due to the rapid expansion of its liberal arts curriculum, the fact that it was no longer just a vocational institution, and its quickly growing enrollment. GVC dean Myron L. Williams continued to serve in the same capacity for NTAC until 1925. That year, Edward Everett Davis succeeded him, and Davis would ultimately serve the college as dean until 1946. Davis had been born in 1881 in Williamsburg, Missouri, moved to Texas as a child in 1885, and graduated from JTAC and the University of Texas at Austin. Prior to being named dean of NTAC, he was the principal of the Lingleville public school and subsequently worked in the education department of Stephen F. Austin State Teacher's College in Nacogdoches. Upon beginning his tenure as dean in 1925, Davis inherited a campus in poor shape physically with a small student body and less than adequate faculty. After adopting the slogan "no dead-beats in faculty or student body", NTAC dismissed or witnessed the withdrawal of 102 out of 456 students in Davis's first year (1925–26). Similarly, by 1927–28, only 17 of the 40 faculty members he inherited in 1925 were still employed by NTAC. When hiring new faculty, Davis demonstrated his preference for young, energetic, and capable teachers.

In 1925, NTAC offered two different educational tracks: a college track designed to prepare students to transfer to a senior college and a trades or vocational track designed to train students for working in fields such as agriculture, automotive repair, the electrical trades, and stenography. Due to falling enrollment in the department by 1933, NTAC discontinued its high school-level, sub-college department, which dated back to the GVC era. Previously, it had served "under-privileged boys and girls from rural communities" mostly in Central Texas and West Texas, and their ages were, on average, older than students in the college track. A survey conducted by NTAC shortly after Davis arrived revealed North Texas to be in particular need of skilled workers in fields such as animal husbandry, aviation, dairying, the electrical trades, and mechanical engineering. In response to this survey, the college added courses in these areas. NTAC was also innovative in the large amount of summer classes and night classes it offered as well as in marketing directly to married and older students. In fall 1925, 15 of the college's hogs won a total of 75 ribbons at state fairs in Alabama, Arkansas, and Louisiana in addition to at three fairs in Texas. More than 40% of NTAC's 1926 graduating class enrolled immediately in senior colleges across the state, including Southern Methodist University, Texas A&M, and the University of Texas.

Enrollment at NTAC grew markedly from 451 in 1925–26 to 821 in 1929–30, although Davis expressed concern over the quality of many entrants. He argued that a high school diploma was not sufficient and that an entrance exam should be required for all potential students. He even went as far as to claim that 25% of Texas's higher education appropriations were "practically wasted on inferior students". Fees at NTAC were relatively low in this era, with a room and board fee of $125 in 1926–27 and all of the other eight fees being less than $10 at that time. In 1931, NTAC advertised itself under the slogan "Free Tuition, Broad Curricula, High Standards, Easy Access", the latter of which emphasized its location between Dallas and Fort Worth and its accessibility by both road and rail transport.

In 1930–31, enrollment fell to 657 students due to the Great Depression. NTAC would not surpass its 1929–30 enrollment figure until 1933–34 when the number of students reached 954. The depression particularly hurt NTAC's vocational program, especially its agriculture, home economics, and trades and industries departments. Furthermore, an innovative cooperative program partnering with local industries that NTAC developed based on a program at the University of Cincinnati and Antioch College was discontinued in 1933 due to a lack of available jobs. While its vocational program foundered, NTAC's college program grew tremendously, from 308 students in 1930 to 603 students in 1933. Davis speculated that this growth was due to an influx of transfer students from less-affordable private schools and a changing attitude during the depression that a liberal arts education was more adaptable and thus more marketable than a more specialized vocational education.

NTAC also responded to the depression by increasing the average number of courses assigned to each faculty member, reducing the total number of faculty, and cutting salaries by 25%. However, in December 1932, the firm of Griffenhagen and Associates published a report for the state legislature on NTAC's operations, concluding that the Davis administration had not done enough in the face of the depression. The report found that the college was overwhelmingly a commuter school and recommended that the state "abandon" and cease funding it, instead proposing that Dallas County and Tarrant County operate it jointly as a junior college. The report made numerous other suggestions to NTAC, ranging from discontinuing all agriculture and education courses to eliminating 14 faculty positions, the associate dean, and most student assistants. It also admonished Davis for advertising NTAC excessively. However, the findings of Griffenhagen and Associates were ultimately unpopular across the state and had little impact on the college. One effect the 1932 report did have was in reducing the number of classes NTAC taught with 10 or fewer students enrolled in them. In 1932, when the report was issued, 36.1% of the college's classes fell into this category. By 1940, just 7% did, which was the lowest such figure at any state college or university in Texas. After an aborted attempt to close the school surfaced in the state legislature in 1935, NTAC would never again face a serious threat of closure or termination of state support.

NTAC slowly recovered from the depression during the mid-1930s as its enrollment grew. In 1935–36, enrollment hit 1,007, the first time it had eclipsed 1,000, and by 1939–40 there were 1,632 students in total. Saxon concludes that the two key reasons for this enrollment growth were NTAC's location between Dallas and Fort Worth and its financial support from the state. In the end, NTAC emerged from the depression with its curriculum still grounded in general and vocational studies. In summer 1937, NTAC was one of only four colleges or universities in the state to host a National Youth Administration rural farm education program for in-need youth, alongside JTAC, Prairie View A&M, and Texas A&M. Also in 1937, Howard Joyner came to NTAC from the University of South Dakota to establish an art department. Trained at the École des Beaux-Arts in Paris, Joyner established NTAC's art department before one existed at the University of Texas. In 1939, the Denton Record-Chronicle described NTAC as essentially "a junior college of Dallas and Fort Worth students who want to get a portion of their education close to home before going to a senior college".

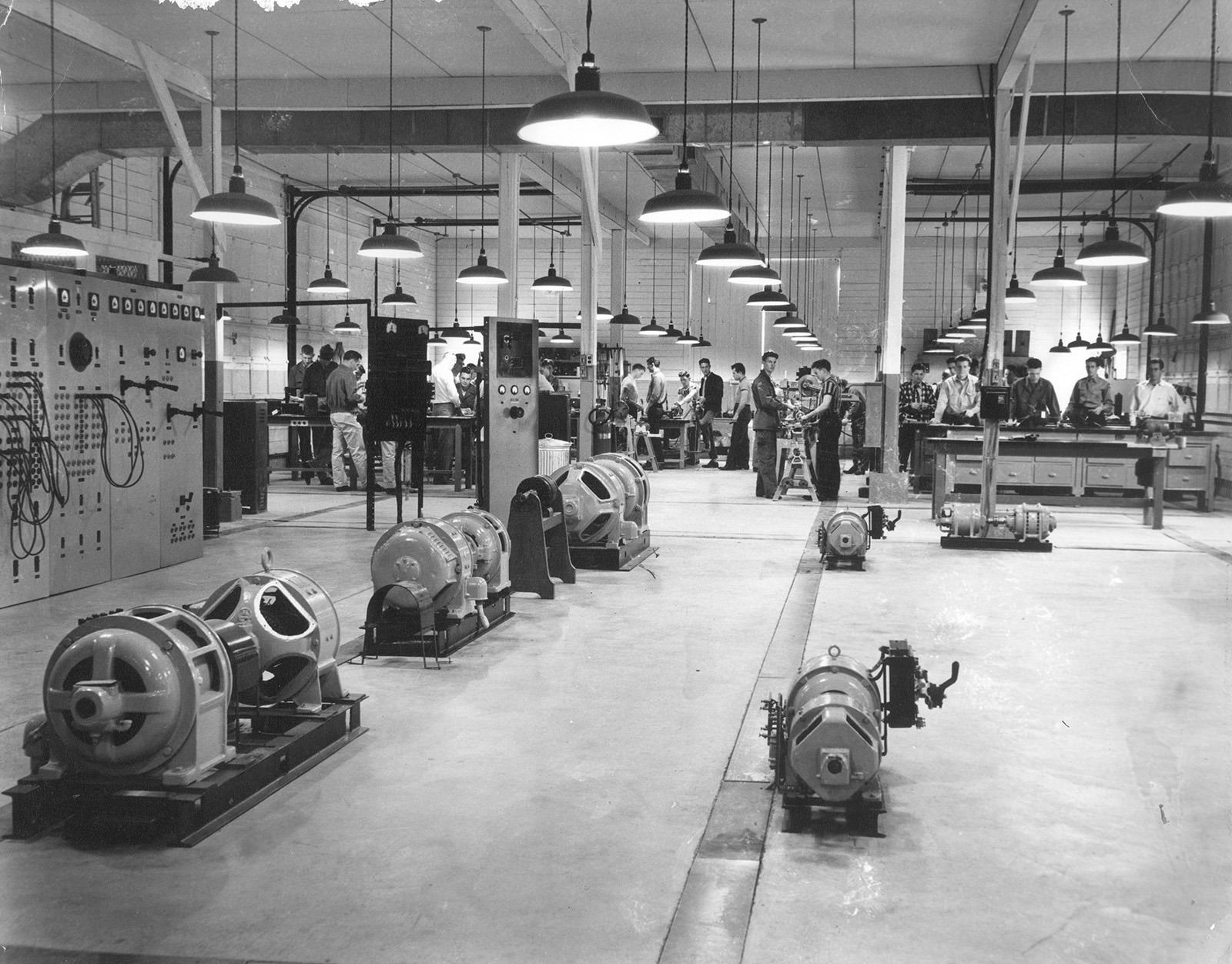
Electrical shop at NTAC, circa 1940s

After the United States entered World War II in 1941, NTAC experienced a major decline in enrollment and saw many faculty members leave to serve in the war, which forced the college to retool its course offerings. While female enrollment stayed steady at about 300 students per year throughout the war, male enrollment dropped precipitously by 47% from 1941 to 1945. During 1944–45, total enrollment had fallen to 1,041 students, down 782 from four years previously. The Davis administration tried to slow the decline in enrollment by recruiting more female students as well as male students under 18 years old. During the war, full-time faculty fell from 77 to 53, while those who remained on campus were required to take a loyalty oath. Courses changed due to the war as well, with new offerings in subjects such as aerial photography and camouflage along with a new flight training program, one of only 13 at colleges or universities that was conducted by the Civil Aeronautics Authority. Women were allowed to take engineering classes for the first time beginning in 1943 while NTAC's ROTC cadets learned commando techniques, Japanese, and jujutsu. In 1943, NTAC was designated as a Navy V-12 instructional center, and during 1944 and 1945 there were four Navy and three Marine platoons assigned to campus. A women's rifle team was also created during the war years.

In April 1945, Davis prepared a report for Texas A&M's president and board that painted an optimistic picture of the future of NTAC, most notably predicting an enrollment of 2,500 shortly after the end of the war. Davis retired on June 1, 1946, at age 65, and by 1946–47 NTAC's enrollment did reach 2,500. Returning soldiers, assisted by the G.I. Bill, accounted for a large part of this growth and made up as much as 46% of the entire student body. Davis's legacy on campus includes Davis Street, which was named for him, and a grove of pine trees at the corner of Davis Street and Park Row Drive that he planted.

In 1946, Ernest H. Hereford was named dean of NTAC as Davis's replacement. He served as such until a reorganization of the college and the other Texas A&M-affiliated schools made him NTAC's first president in October 1948. The reorganization formally created the Texas A&M University System on September 1, 1948, and instituted the new position of chancellor as the head of the system. At the same time, the chief administrators at its four constituent schools (A&M, JTAC, NTAC, and Prairie View A&M) were named presidents. While the reorganization relieved the A&M president of the additional duties of serving as the de facto chancellor of the system, in practice the system retained its rigid administrative structure and a commitment to keeping the three branch campuses subordinate to the main campus in College Station.

Hereford had been educated at North Texas State Teachers College, Baylor University, Southwestern University, and the University of Texas at Austin. He served as superintendent of schools in Corpus Christi, president of Corpus Christi Junior College, state college examiner and curriculum director at the Texas Department of Education, and dean of staff at Dallas's Hockaday School before arriving at NTAC. While in Arlington, he was groomed to be Davis's successor and promoted from registrar to associate dean in 1943 before being named dean in 1946. Similar to Davis, Hereford was criticized by some faculty as being "autocratic" and "egotistical", while other faculty praised him as a "sophisticate" and for his requirement for doctoral degrees as prerequisites for most new faculty.

=== Four-year college status ===
Beginning in 1937, there was a movement in Arlington to elevate NTAC to four-year college status and change the name of the college. Davis started supporting this movement in 1938. He argued that NTAC's location in North Texas, large student body, and relatively low cost per credit hour made it a strong candidate for senior-college status. Throughout the 1940s, the NTAC administration petitioned the Texas A&M University board of directors and the state government to upgrade it to a senior college, albeit without any success. Opposition came not only from Texas A&M (many NTAC alumni and supporters believed A&M feared the Arlington branch campus would eventually overtake it in both prestige and size) but also from local private schools Southern Methodist University and Texas Christian University. While not immediately successful in obtaining four-year college status, NTAC supporters did succeed in convincing the A&M system and the state government to rename the school. Many supporters thought the name "North Texas Agricultural College" was limiting and confusing due to the word "agricultural", and the preferred choice of Arlington State College was made the official new name in the summer of 1949. Many of its supporters thought that such a move would enhance the college's prestige as well as the perceived value of its degrees.

=== Building development ===
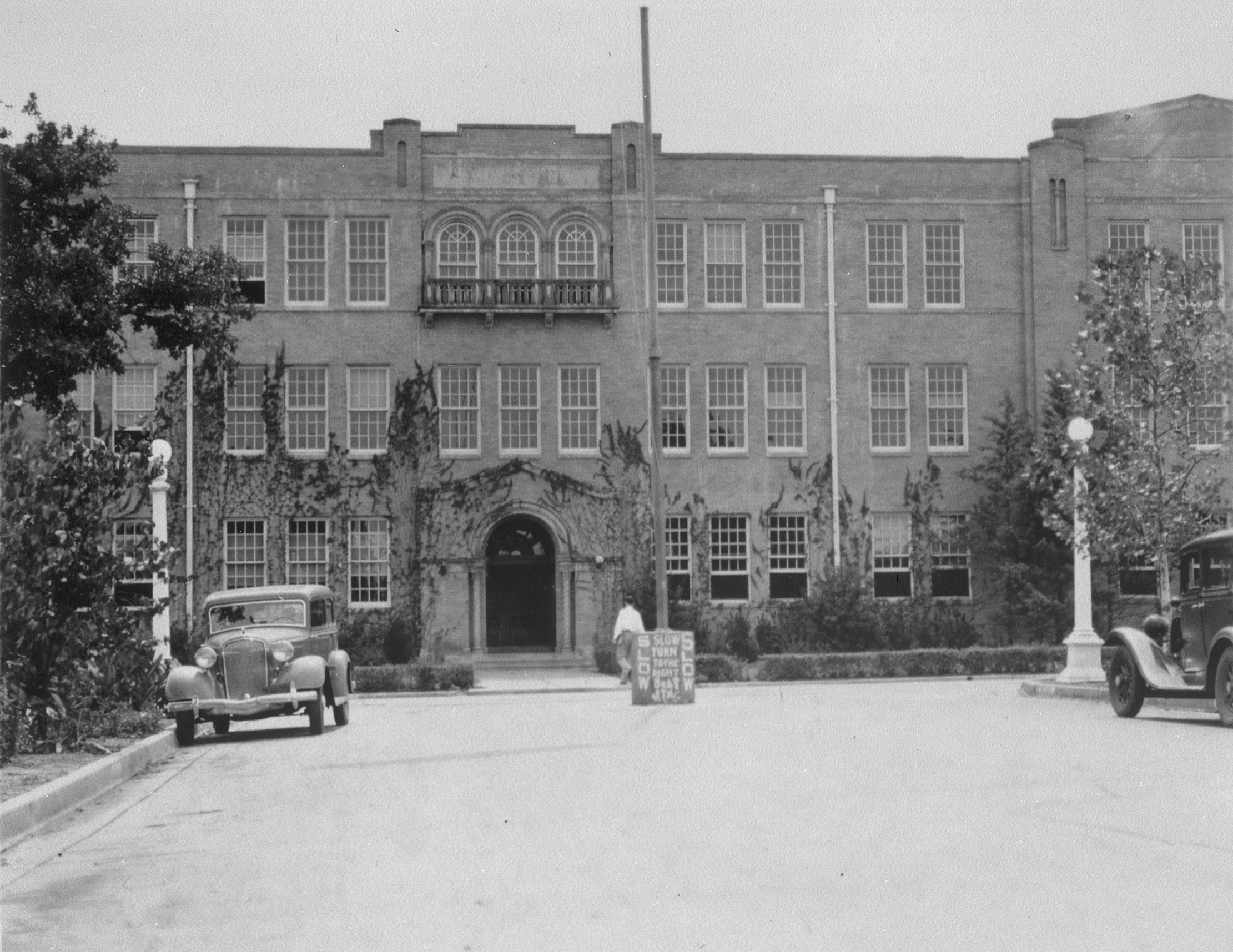
Administration Building at NTAC, circa 1935

Despite many of its proposals for new buildings ultimately not being approved or funded by the state government, NTAC did receive funds to build a new library (later renamed College Hall) in 1926 and a new science building (later renamed Preston Hall) in 1928. In its 1926 budget proposal, for comparison, NTAC requested four new buildings and total funding of over $830,000. In addition to hosting the library, College Hall was also home to the NTAC Exchange Store (PX), which sold accessories, military uniforms, and school supplies. Much later, it would become home to the University of Texas at Arlington (UTA)'s Honors College. A circular building on the south perimeter of Preston Hall was also built in 1928. Over the years, it would serve as a cattle showroom, an art studio, History Department offices, an art printing laboratory, and the UTA planetarium.

During the 1930s, two new buildings were constructed on campus. The first was a brick gymnasium and auditorium located adjacent to the Administration Building that opened in 1934. The second was a men's dormitory built with federal Public Works Administration funding known as Davis Hall, which opened in 1936 and was eventually renamed Brazos House. This building later became the first coeducational dormitory in Texas. In the early 1940s, NTAC constructed a Mechanical Arts Building that provided space for classrooms, offices, and workshops. By the late 1940s, the campus had grown in size to eight city blocks.

=== Student life ===
Student life during the NTAC era was vibrant, although there was a cultural split between the students who lived on campus and those who commuted for classes. The Shorthorn continued as the student newspaper, while in 1923 the first edition of the college yearbook, the Junior Aggie, was printed. Freshman at NTAC, referred to as "fish", were subject to hazing by sophomores. Hazing persisted despite efforts by Dean Davis to ban it and expel those found guilty of it. The student body elected cheerleaders, class officers, representatives on the Student-Faculty Committee, and a homecoming court consisting of a king, queen, princess, and escorts.

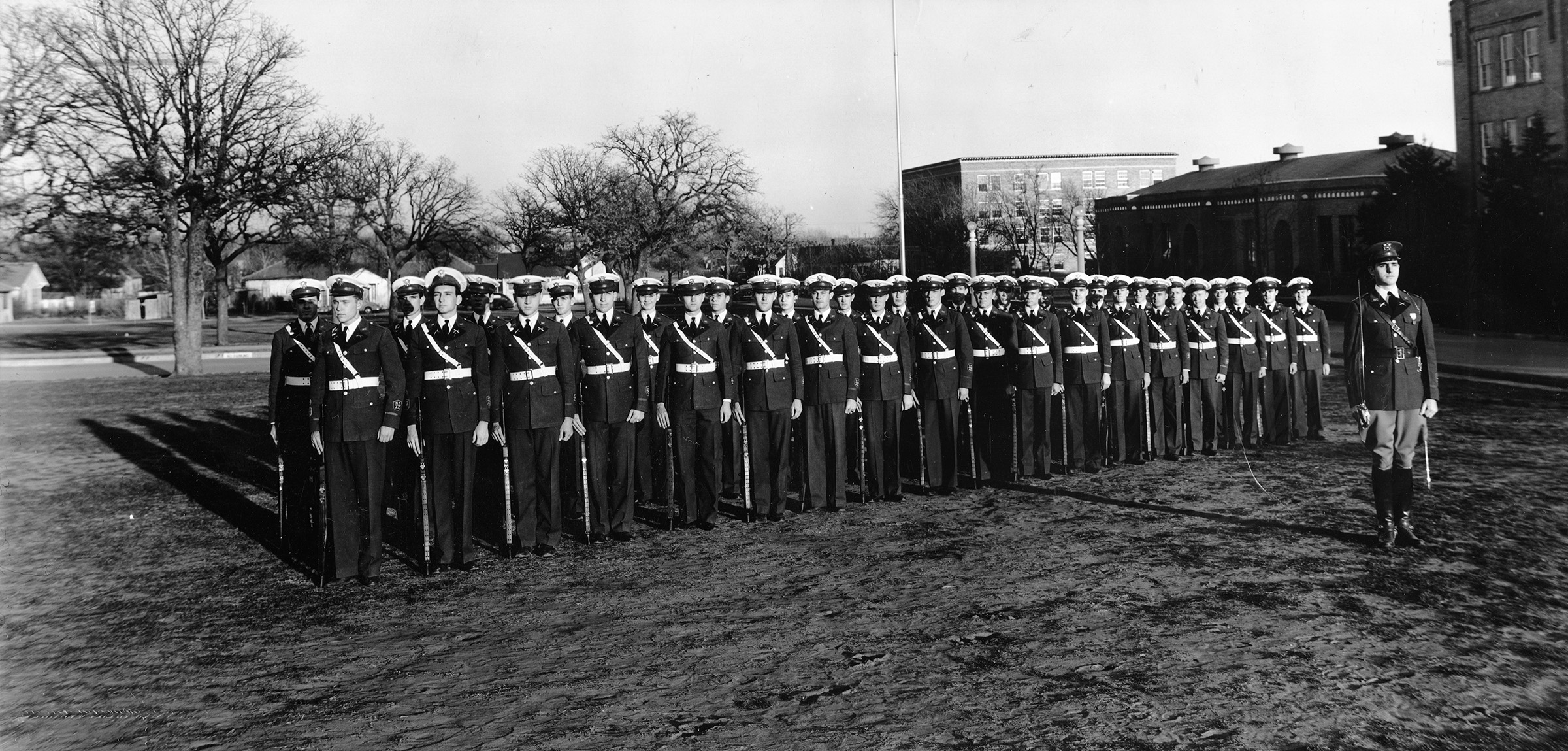
Sam Houston Rifles, 1939

Except for those who were married or over 30 years old, all male students were members of the ROTC cadet corps, which was created in August 1923. In 1933, it established a drill team, which became the Sam Houston Rifles (nicknamed the "Jodies") in 1937. The Sam Houston Rifles eventually became the oldest extant organization in the ROTC program, and went on to perform in the 1957 inauguration of President Dwight D. Eisenhower. In 1939, NTAC's 34-member college band, under the direction of Col. Earl D. Irons, toured 14 cities throughout West Texas.

Student behavior was strictly controlled at NTAC: a curfew was enforced starting at 7:20 pm every night, dancing was forbidden, firearms were prohibited, and demerits were given for rules infractions. At NTAC, classes were held five days a week, with lectures generally occurring in the morning and labs in the afternoon. Campus clubs and organizations typically met on Thursday afternoons, while social functions were generally scheduled for Friday and Saturday nights.

Student clubs were also popular during the NTAC era, and by 1933 there were 25 such clubs on campus. These included clubs based on geographic origin (such as Dallas County, Tarrant County, and West Texas), activities and subjects, an honor society (Phi Kappa Theta), music clubs, and social clubs for female students. The college's jazz orchestra was established by Dan Burkholder in 1947. Other student activities during the period included a Students' Council, dances, performances, and lectures. Among the noted guest speakers on campus during this era were Texas folklorist J. Frank Dobie, Texas governor Beauford H. Jester, U.S. Secretary of Labor Frances Perkins, and historians Arnold Toynbee and Walter Prescott Webb. Grand Ole Opry star Minnie Pearl also entertained NTAC students in 1947.

=== Athletics ===
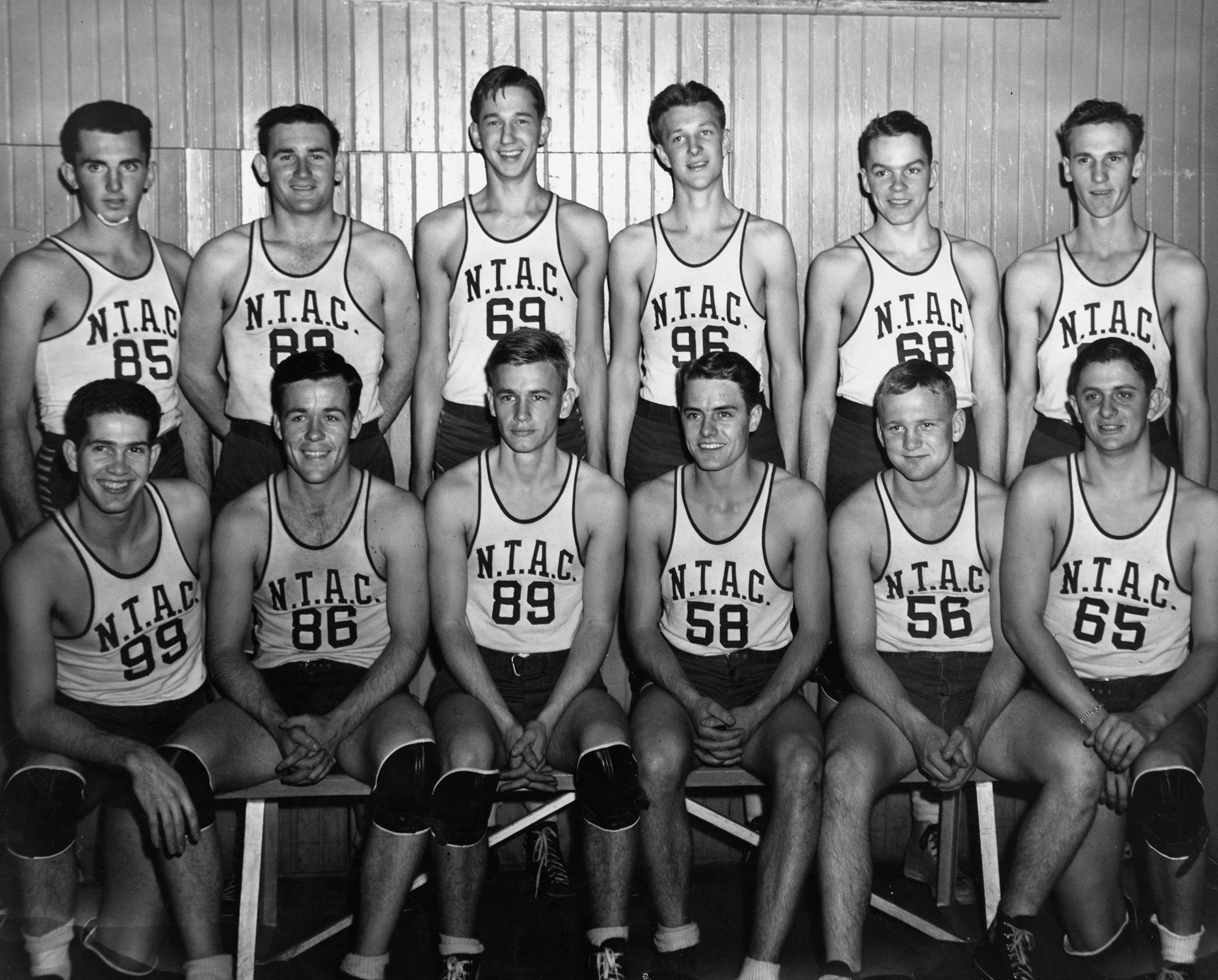
NTAC men's basketball team, 1944

NTAC fielded intercollegiate athletics teams using the "Hornets" nickname. Its football team consistently drew the largest crowds and most overall support of any sport. The NTAC Hornets played against other junior colleges as well as junior varsity teams from senior colleges. Common opponents included Decatur Baptist College, Hillsboro Junior College, Paris Junior College, Texarkana Junior College, and NTAC's chief rival, John Tarleton Agricultural College (JTAC) in Stephenville. In 1943, NTAC fielded an unusually strong football team due to a contingent of Marines who had been recruited to play football at SMU and TCU being ordered to report to the Arlington college that year. The 1943 Hornets beat SMU 20–6, defeated Texas Tech 34–14, and played Texas A&M to a scoreless tie. In the estimation of Fort Worth Star-Telegram writer Dick Moore, NTAC was "one of the strongest football teams in the Southwest" that season.

NTAC and JTAC typically played each other for homecoming, and both held an Aggie Bonfire and a pep rally before the game. Long-standing tradition held that both student bodies attempted to prematurely light the other's bonfire, until an ill-fated 1939 attempt by two NTAC students to drop a phosphorus bomb on the JTAC bonfire from an airplane ended in a crash landing and hazing by JTAC students. After this event, Dean Davis ended the annual NTAC bonfire. The school's fight song in this period was "Northaggieland", with music by NTAC band director Earl D. Irons and lyrics by Enid Eastland.

NTAC also offered intercollegiate basketball, tennis, and track and field for male students. In 1938, the men's tennis team won the Central Texas Conference tournament, defeating teams from Hillsboro Junior College, JTAC, and Weatherford College. After 1927, the Women's Athletic Association offered basketball, indoor baseball, gymnastics, tennis, and volleyball for female students at NTAC. However, there were no opportunities for them to compete at the intercollegiate level.

== Arlington State College (1949–1965) ==
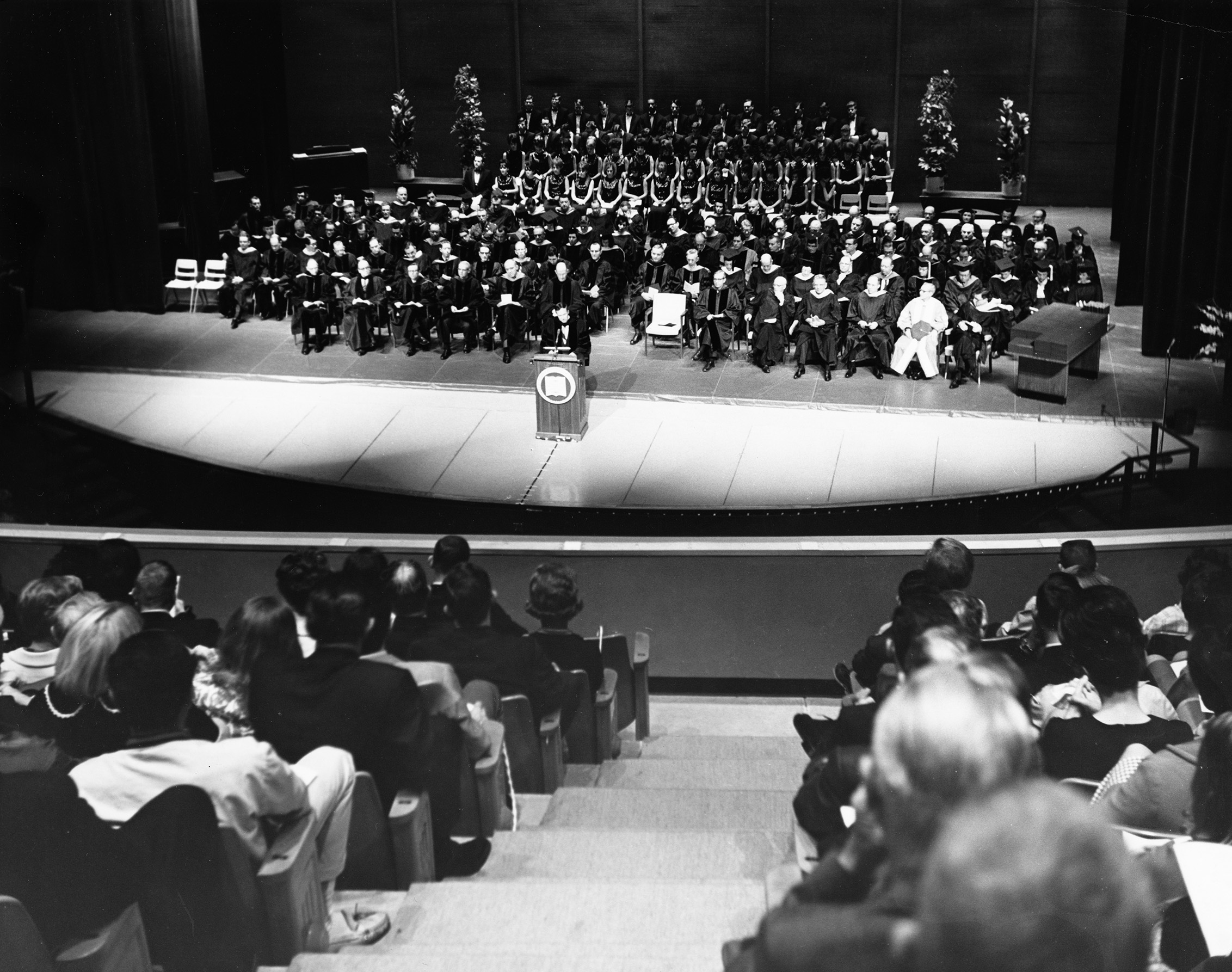
Arlington State College graduation ceremony, circa 1950s

In September 1949, NTAC was renamed Arlington State College (ASC), in part because agriculture was no longer a major course of study at the college. During the 1950s, it was the largest state junior college in the Southwest. It also grew from the 14th largest state-supported college or university in Texas in 1951 to the 5th largest in 1959. Similarly, Arlington itself grew from 6,000 people to 45,000 between 1950 and 1960.

During the 1950s, ASC students began enrolling in courses in the arts and sciences, business, and engineering en masse. Engineering majors nearly quadrupled from 445 to 1,635 between 1953 and 1956. Also during the 1950s, the agriculture and home economics programs experienced a noticeable decrease in students. As the college's administration came to realize this was part of a national trend, it ended the agriculture program in 1957 and the home economics program in 1959. During the 1950s, ASC offered students the ability to study for the first two years of a Bachelor of Arts or Bachelor of Science degree in a wide variety of subjects or pursue a two-year associate degree in general studies.

On November 24, 1958, President Hereford died in office unexpectedly due to a heart attack at the age of 63. During his tenure, enrollment at the college had nearly quadrupled. Both the Hereford Student Center and its Rosebud Theater (named for Hereford's nickname of "Old Rosebud") were named in his memory. The Texas A&M directors appointed ASC dean Jack Woolf as acting president and eventually permanent president in June 1959. Woolf had been born and raised in Trinidad in East Texas, educated at both Texas A&M and Purdue University, and worked at Convair for five years before returning to A&M to teach in 1956. In 1957, he was named the dean of ASC. In 1958, ASC began outreach programs, including a cooperative program that involved its foreign language department with the Summer Institute of Linguistics in Dallas County.

By the time it was finally awarded senior-college status in 1959, ASC's student enrollment was 6,388. By that year it was also awarding undergraduate degrees in the arts, business administration, the sciences, and engineering. From fall 1959, ASC billed itself as a regional institution that offered degrees in business, engineering, liberal arts, and the sciences. According to Samuel B. Hamlett, the growth of Arlington as well as the larger Dallas–Fort Worth metroplex pushed the rapid development of ASC after 1959. Enrollment grew to 7,444 in fall 1960 and to 9,116 in fall 1963, which made ASC larger than Texas A&M. During this period, ASC was overwhelmingly a commuter school; in 1962, just 338 male students and 144 female students lived in dormitories on campus. Roughly 20% of students were part-time students and 30% were enrolled in evening classes that year.

From 1959 through 1965, ASC was composed of two constituent schools. The first was the School of Arts and Sciences, which was home to its business, liberal arts, and science programs. The second was the School of Engineering, home to five different engineering programs. Upon the establishment of the schools in 1959, S. T. Keim, Jr. was hired as the Dean of Arts and Sciences while Wendell Nedderman was hired as the Dean of Engineering. In 1959, ASC's total budget was $3.1 million. A 1963 Dallas Morning News article opined that the college was "geared to the space age and also to the North Texas business and cultural community".

In 1960, various departments at ASC began offering lecture series and short courses. Similarly, in 1964 the ASC History Department commenced the annual Walter Prescott Webb Memorial Lectures for the purpose of attracting leading American history scholars to campus. In 1964, ASC was fully accredited by the Southern Association of Colleges and Schools (SACS). ASC was also accredited by the Texas Association of Colleges and Universities in 1962 as well as subject-specific associations for its undergraduate programs in accounting, architecture, business administration, engineering, nursing, and social work.

By the mid-1960s, the number of faculty members at ASC had grown to approximately 400. At that time, about 50% of engineering faculty held Doctor of Philosophy (Ph.D.) degrees and over 40% of liberal arts and science faculty did likewise. Among the greatest complaints of faculty members at the time were the low academic level and lack of intellectual engagement of many students. Faculty attempted to remedy this by improving faculty-student communication. Faculty also advocated for greater opportunities to research and write, graduate-level programs, a faculty forum, and a policy on academic freedom. In 1965, the A&M board approved ASC's request to divide the School of Arts and Sciences into separate schools for its three major programs, resulting in the creation of the School of Business, the School of Liberal Arts, and the School of Science.

=== Building development ===
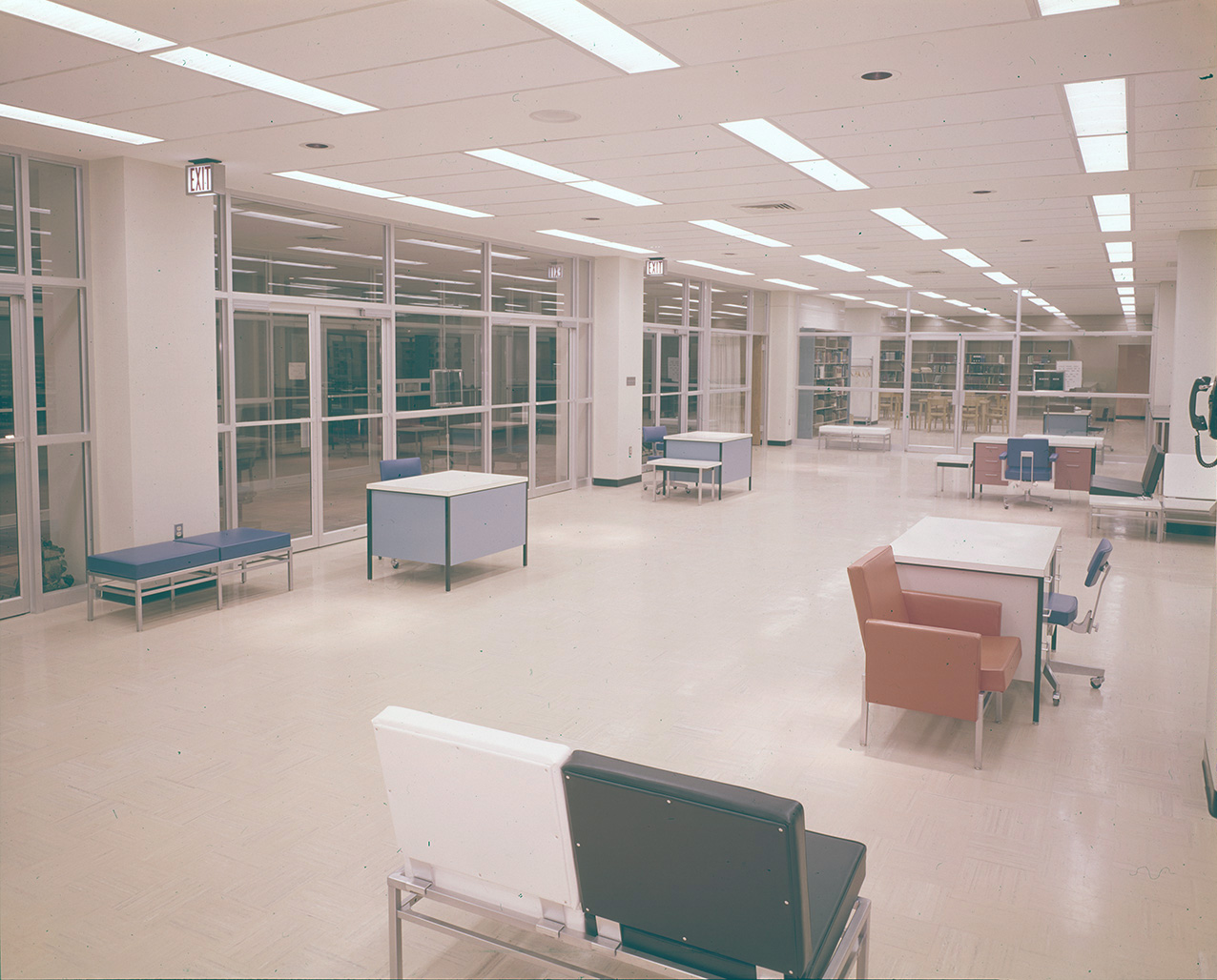
Interior of the Arlington State College Library, circa 1963

Between 1950 and 1965, ASC conducted a major building campaign that resulted in the creation of 18 new buildings on campus for $14.225 million. This followed eight years of no construction whatsoever and 30 years since the construction of the college's last permanent classroom building. With $6.5 million in funding from the Permanent University Fund via the Texas A&M University System, ASC built a men's dormitory (Pachl Hall), a women's dormitory (Lipscomb Hall), an engineering building, a science hall, a student center, and a football stadium (Memorial Stadium) between 1949 and 1957. By the late 1950s, with the support of A&M system chancellor M. T. Harrington and the City of Arlington, President Hereford began acquiring land on both sides of Cooper Street for a proposed ten-year, $10-million building program. The Texas Attorney General's office used eminent domain to force landowners who did not wish to part with their property to sell it to the college.

In November 1960, ASC released a master plan that proposed acquiring more land both east and south of campus. The plan also effectively controlled placement of buildings on campus through the 1990s. In quick succession in the early 1960s, ASC built a new engineering building for $2.25 million (in 1960), a new science building for $2.1 million (in 1961), and a new library for $1.5 million (in 1964). The two-story library was designed by George Dahl to later be expanded to six stories, which ultimately occurred in 1967. ASC also built an addition to its student center in 1961, expanded its football stadium and built a new gymnasium in 1962, and augmented dormitory capacity for both men (with the new Trinity House) and women (with an expansion to Lipscomb Hall). After the completion of the addition to the Hereford Student Center in 1961, the total value of ASC's buildings reached $9 million. In 1965, ASC opened its new Arlington State College Multipurpose Auditorium (renamed Texas Hall in 1968) with a performance by jazz musician Louis Armstrong. It served as a multi-purpose venue for athletics, concerts, and theater.

During the 1960s, ASC also became one of the first institutions of higher education in Texas to build facilities with "revenue financing", which was funded by both income from room and board payments and building-use fees included in tuition payments. Rapid growth of the campus by the mid-1960s was fueled by ASC's senior-college status, its developing graduate programs, and its frequent acquisition of land.

=== Four-year college status ===
Throughout the 1950s, President Hereford and ASC supporters, including Arlington mayor Tom Vandergriff, tried without success to have ASC elevated to four-year college status. Three bills proposing such a change all failed to be voted upon by the state legislature in 1951, 1955, and 1957, respectively. The A&M board of directors was also reluctant to support ASC's aspirations to be a four-year school until 1958, when it committed to funding campus expansion in Arlington by selling the college's farm, which was located east of campus. In February 1957, Metroplex business leaders and Vandergriff addressed the Texas Commission on Higher Education (TCHE) in support of four-year status for ASC. However, the TCHE only committed to further consideration of the proposal. It postponed deciding on an in-depth study that could take up to 15 months was conducted, effectively delaying ASC's senior-college ambitions. The TCHE released its findings in December 1958, recommending to the Texas Legislature that ASC be made a senior college starting in September 1959 with baccalaureate-level degree programs in business administration as well as for numerous liberal arts and science programs. The location and size of ASC were key reasons for the TCHE's decision.

Despite opposition from Alonzo Jamison of Denton, which was home to North Texas State College (NTSC) and Texas Woman's University, and William T. Moore of Bryan, home to Texas A&M, ASC's four-year bill passed the house on March 4, 1959. Its counterpart passed the Senate on April 20. Writing for the Denton Record-Chronicle, Tom Kirkland noted many NTSC supporters believed four-year status for ASC would have a considerable negative effect on their school, but NTSC president J. C. Matthews downplayed these concerns. On April 27, Texas governor Price Daniel signed the bill that made ASC a four-year college in the presence of ASC president Woolf, Arlington mayor Vandergriff, and other dignitaries. When the news reached the ASC campus, classes were abruptly canceled and spontaneous celebrations erupted. The headline in The Shorthorn on April 28, the next day, was simply "Made it at Last". Vandergriff later described ASC's attainment of four-year college status as "one of the most satisfying moments of my life". Implementation of senior-college courses began in fall 1959 with the addition of junior-level courses and concluded in fall 1960 with the addition of senior-level courses. In 1961, ASC awarded its first bachelor's degrees, granting degrees to 23 students in electrical and mechanical engineering.

=== Integration ===
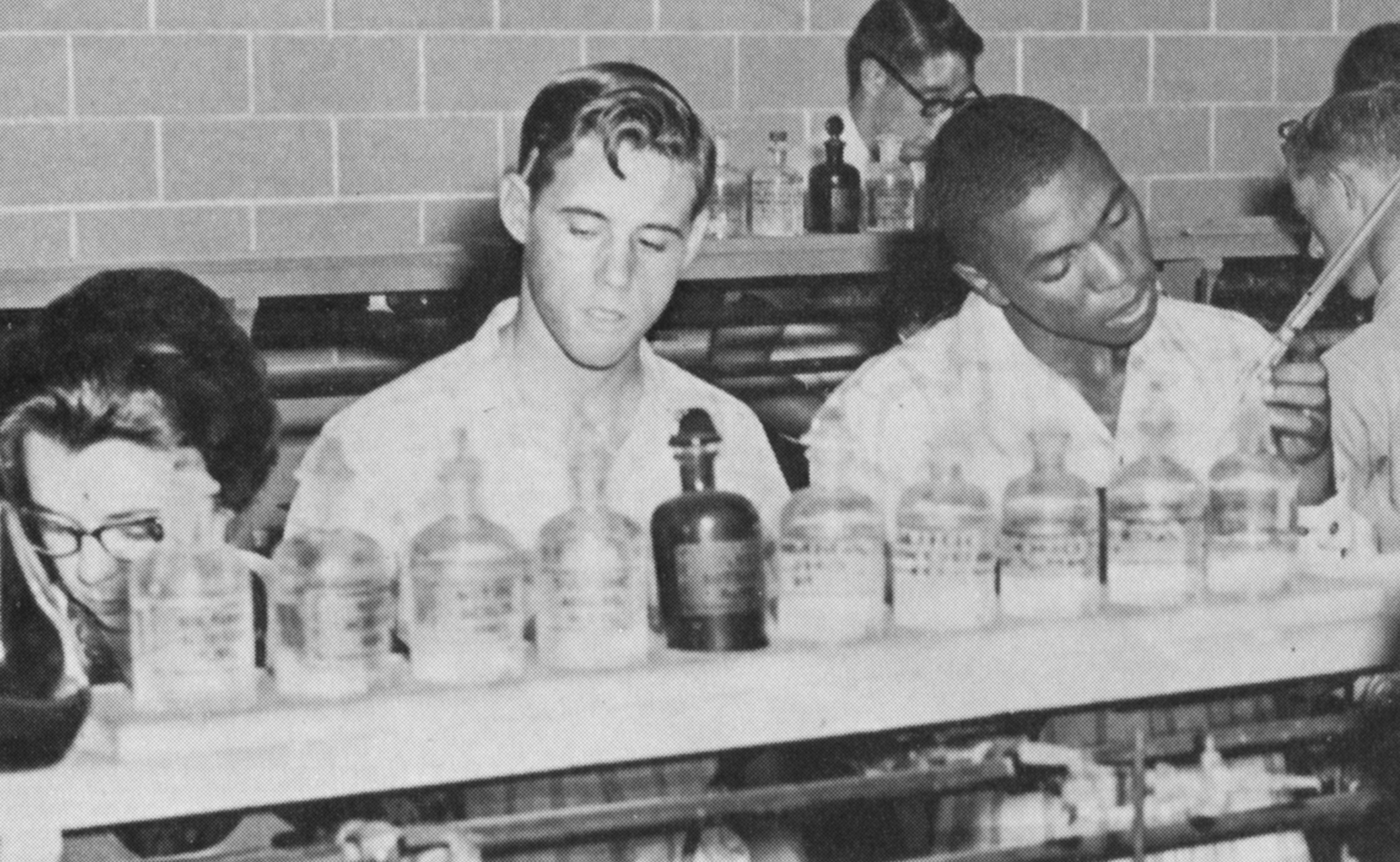
One of the first African American students accepted to Arlington State College in 1962 (name of the student not noted)

In 1959, when it became a four-year college, ASC remained open only to white students. At the time, this was the policy of all Texas A&M-affiliated colleges and universities except for Prairie View A&M, which was then the only state-supported college for people of color in Texas. In the late 1950s and early 1960s, the ASC administration refused to accept African American students, referring them to Prairie View A&M instead. In 1997, Dallas native Jesse Oliver recalled being offended at being referred to Prairie View when he applied for admission to ASC in spring 1962. He noted that ASC was a 20-minute drive from his home in Dallas, compared to Prairie View's campus being four hours away. As early as 1956, a poll conducted by The Shorthorn revealed a clear majority of polled ASC students (72 of 96) responded that they would be willing to attend classes with African American students.

In 1962, after Ernest Hooper, Jerry Hanes, and Leaston Chase III were denied admission to ASC on account of race, they sought legal representation. They were represented by the Legal Redress Committee of the Dallas branch of the NAACP and Dallas attorney Fred J. Finch, Jr. Not willing to go to court to defend segregation at ASC, the A&M system board of directors and Chancellor Harrington allowed ASC president Woolf to change the admission policy immediately and become the first A&M system school to integrate. ASC announced its integration on July 10, 1962, and admitted its first African American students in September, becoming the 9th out of 19 state-supported Texas colleges and universities to integrate.

The majority of both students and faculty supported integration at ASC, as did both Arlington newspapers, the Daily News Texan and the Arlington Citizen-Journal. However, President Woolf received angry letters and hate mail from segregationists in the area. Approximately 25–30 students at ASC were African Americans in fall 1962, out of a student body of over 9,000. One of those first African American students was Jesse Oliver, who had been denied admission on account of their race just the previous spring. By the late 1960s, African American students accounted for about 1–2% of enrollment every year. Not all components of ASC were fully integrated in September 1962, however. Athletics teams were integrated in 1963 and dormitories were not integrated until 1965, at which point ASC was deemed "fully integrated". However, even after "full" integration of the college, only 14 of ASC's 61 academic clubs, social clubs, fraternities, and other organizations had been integrated. Similarly, ASC did not prioritize hiring African American faculty or administrators during the mid-1960s. Unlike at some other Southern schools, such as the University of Mississippi, integration at ASC occurred peacefully. In August 1965, Oscar K. Chambers became ASC's first African American ROTC graduate.

=== Move to the University of Texas System ===
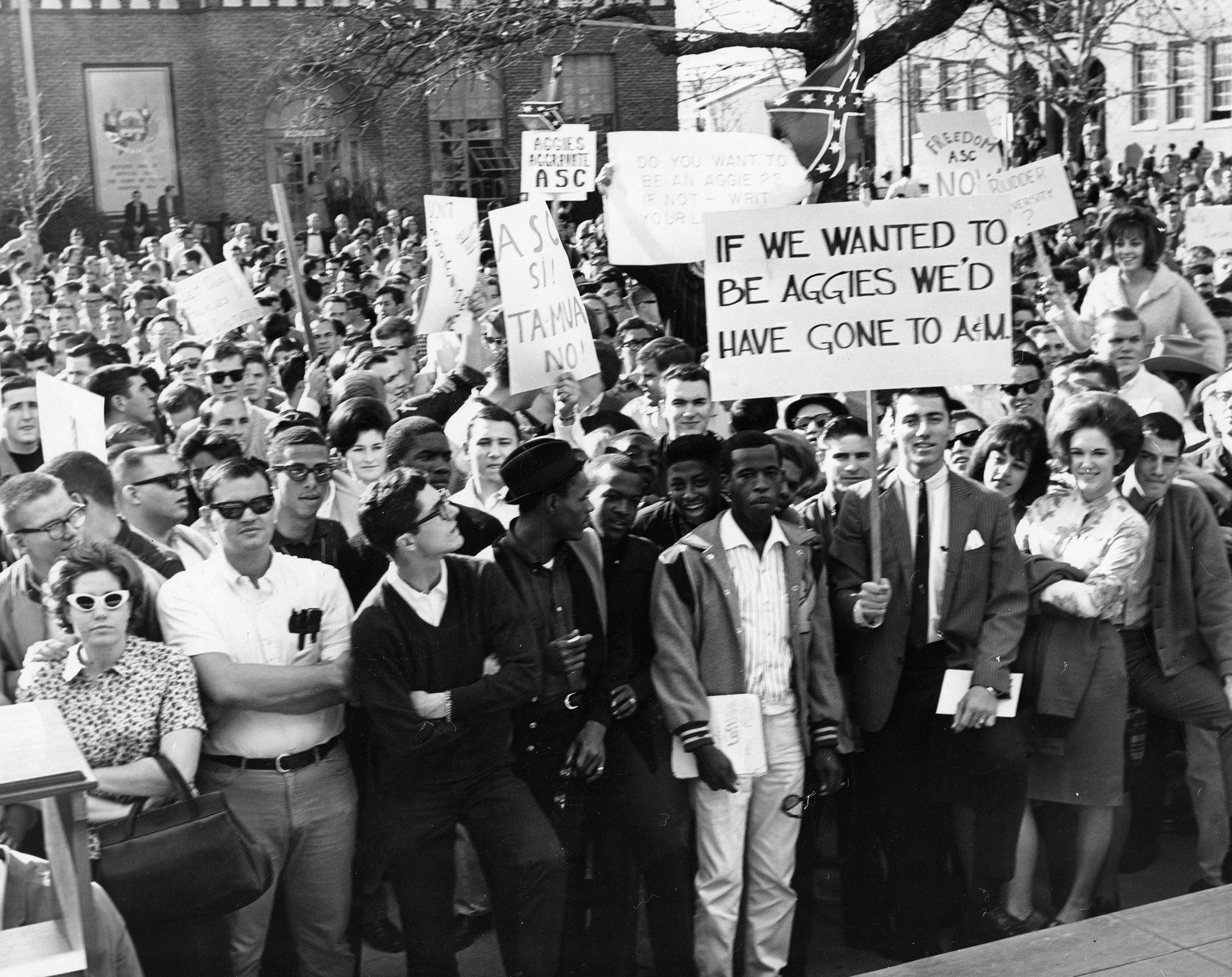
Students at Arlington State College during the Texas A&M controversy, 1965

The major underlying factors in ASC's growing disillusionment with the Texas A&M University System were ASC supporters' belief that the college's interests were subjugated to those of A&M in College Station, the A&M administrative style was too rigid and provided too few opportunities for faculty engagement and influence, and A&M's lack of adequate investment into ASC while it was growing quickly. In particular, A&M's lack of support for a graduate program at ASC and its unwillingness to construct new buildings on the campus in Arlington were among the largest points of contention.

In December 1964, these long-standing tensions between ASC and the Texas A&M board of directors reached a fever pitch, as many supporters of the Arlington college believed that their interests were being neglected. A&M proposed a reorganization of its system inspired by the University of California System. A proposal made by four members of the A&M board of directors would have renamed ASC "Texas A&M University at Arlington", more closely integrated it into the A&M system, created master's programs in eleven fields (including seven in engineering) that would be directed by the College Station graduate school dean, and shared A&M facilities and faculty with the graduate programs at ASC. In the words of Saxon, A&M administrators and board of directors members "were unprepared–and totally surprised–at the firestorm of protests and hostility these proposals generated". President Woolf observed that the A&M board did not ask for feedback or input from ASC administrators on the proposal, Fort Worth Chamber of Commerce member Marvin C. Nichols deemed it a public relations failure, and the reaction of the ASC community and Arlington residents was largely negative. The ASC student government passed a resolution against the A&M system proposal and formed a "Save Our School Committee" to oppose it.

On January 6, 1965, Texas A&M president James Earl Rudder met with key ASC officials and student government officers as well as Vandergriff, Tarrant County state senator Don Kennard, and members of the Dallas and Fort Worth chambers of commerce in an attempt to alleviate their fears. However, Rudder failed to commit to resolving any of ASC's three biggest concerns: how quickly it could offer graduate programs, its need for additional funds for building construction, and its role and level of autonomy in a restructured A&M system. Rudder did promise that neither he nor the A&M board would prevent ASC from leaving the system if it desired. This meeting served to polarize the two increasingly divided factions on the ASC campus. The first favored remaining in a modified A&M system, which was supported by President Woolf, the deans at ASC, and many Dallas Chamber of Commerce members. The second preferred to leave the system entirely, which was supported by most of the students, alumni, and faculty as well as Vandergriff, the Fort Worth Chamber of Commerce, and state legislators representing the region.

After learning that Rudder did not oppose ASC leaving the A&M system, Texas governor John Connally agreed to assist the college. Senate Bill 401 met with little opposition in either the Texas House of Representatives or Senate, and it was signed into law by Connally on April 23. It ended ASC's 48 years of affiliation with Texas A&M, for which President Woolf expressed gratitude. ASC and Woolf were publicly welcomed to the UT System by chancellor Harry Ransom and UT Board of Regents chairman William Womack Heath, who celebrated by hosting a luncheon at the Commodore Perry Hotel in Austin. Upon hearing the news in Arlington, ASC students spontaneously celebrated by firing the school cannon and listening to speeches commemorating the occasion.

In the immediate aftermath of ASC joining the UT System, the system held a board meeting on the ASC campus as a gesture of goodwill, and emphasized that the Arlington school would be equal to the other five UT System institutions and not a branch campus, and committed to supporting ASC's growth and development. All of this contributed positively to the outlook of both students and faculty at ASC. On the eve of the signing of Senate Bill 401, President Woolf commented, "Arlington State College now becomes associated with a great university." In the assessment of historian Gerald Saxon, "the break between A&M and ASC was over money and status". The split between the two was ultimately satisfactory to both sides, underscored by an editorial in The Shorthorn that opined that it was "probably the first divorce in history where everybody concerned lived happily ever after".

=== Student life ===
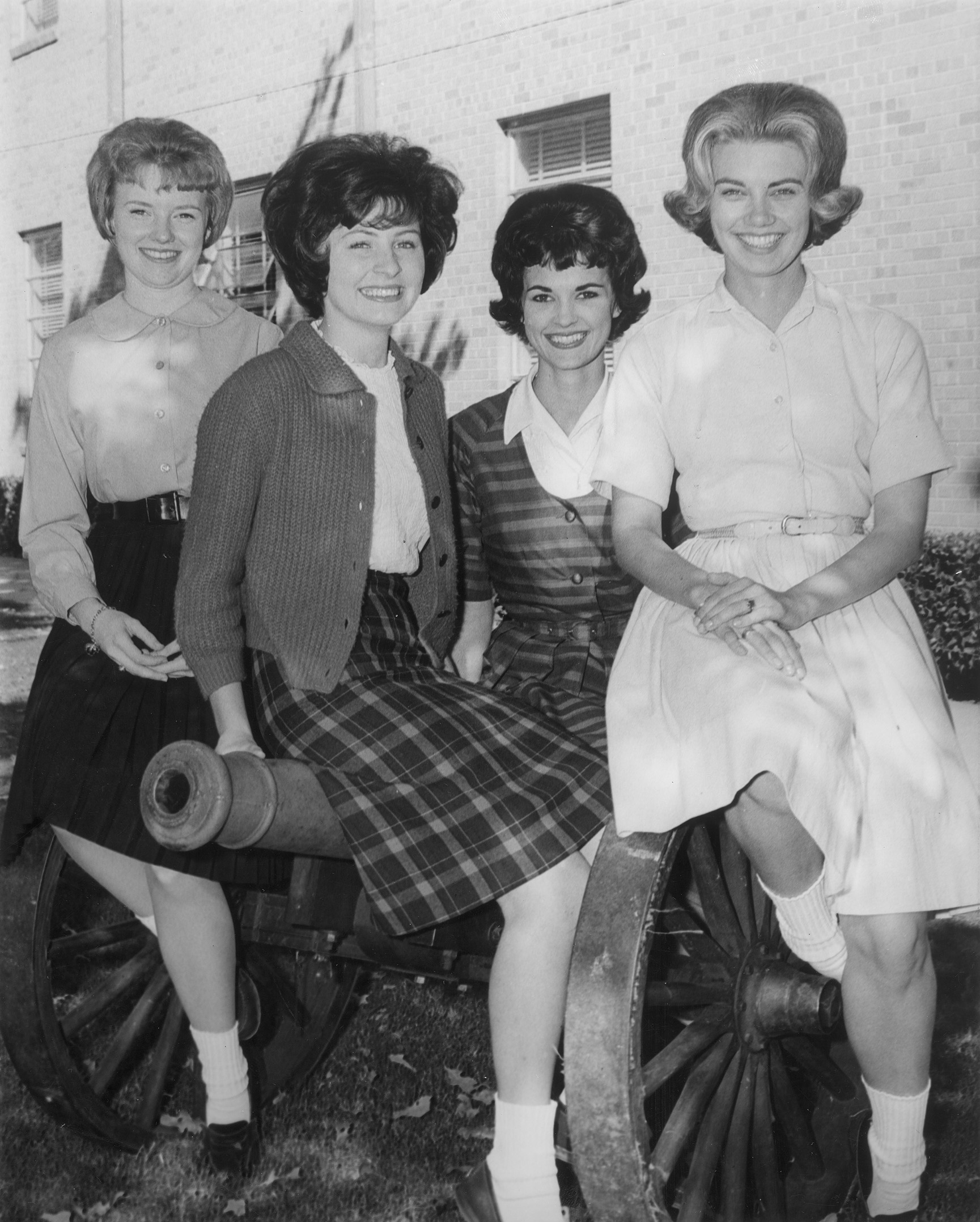
Miss Dixie Belle candidates, 1962

Student life evolved rapidly during the ASC era. However, social and political issues were not a major part of the campus culture at the time. During the ASC era, the college encouraged the creation of student clubs and societies based on interest as well as professional and social organizations, which grew rapidly in number between the late 1950s and mid-1960s. In 1954, ASC made its cadet corps optional for the first time in its history. The Shorthorn continued to serve as the student newspaper on campus while the Arlington Review was created in 1962 as a literary magazine publishing the works of students.

In 1961, ASC created the Student Activities Program, which organized activities, dances, guest speaker appearances, and the screening of films at the Hereford Student Center. In fall 1965, its events were attended by over 5,000 people at a time when just 970 students lived in dormitories on campus. Featured performers included jazz musician Lionel Hampton, classical guitarist Andrés Segovia, and the Vienna Boys' Choir. Among the most popular student events on campus during the mid-1960s were dances, Western Day, and the Winter Olympics, which featured oddball events such as tricycle-pulled chariot races and pogo-stick jumping.

Student government became more prominent and effective during the ASC era. In the 1950s, ASC had a 20-member Student Council whose members were all appointed by the college president. In 1962, the Student Council was enlarged to 30 members, 16 of whom were elected by ASC students and the remaining 14 of whom were appointed by the president.

=== Athletics ===
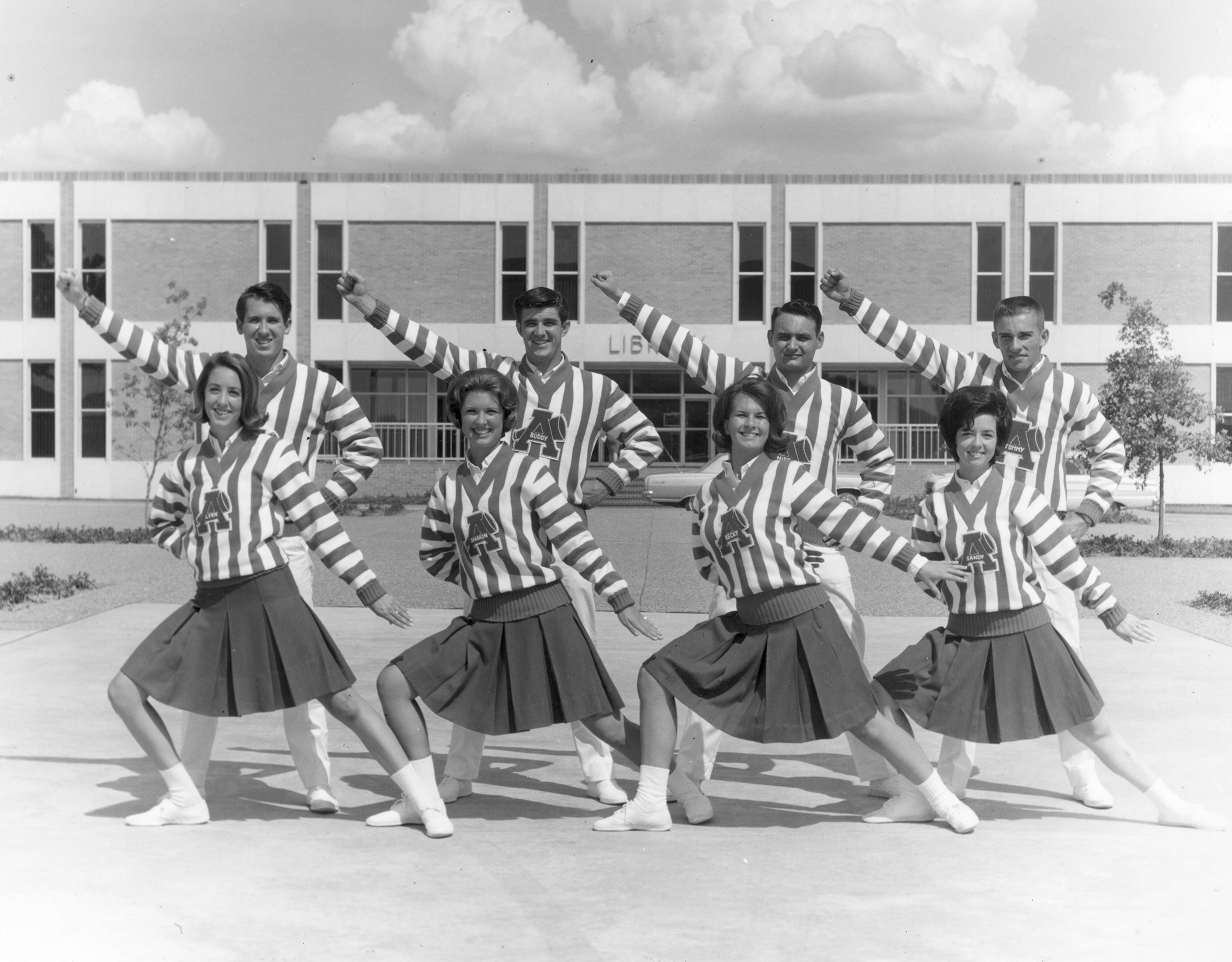
ASC cheerleaders, circa 1964

After construction began during the NTAC era in 1946, ASC opened its new $60,000, all-steel War Memorial Stadium in September 1951. It was dedicated to the 207 NTAC students who were killed in World War II.

In 1956 and 1957, the ASC Rebels football team won back-to-back Junior Rose Bowls, which brought the college national recognition for the first time. In 1956, the football team finished the regular season 8–1–1 and as Pioneer Conference co-champions under the direction of head coach Chena Gilstrap. They were invited to play in the Junior Rose Bowl against California's Compton College, entering the game as a substantial underdog. Behind the performance of running back Calvin Lee, ASC won the game 20–13 in front of 35,000 spectators.

In 1957, ASC returned to the Junior Rose Bowl with an undefeated record and as the heavy favorite against California's Cerritos Junior College, which had only existed for a year. ASC won 21–12 with a team that included eight All-Americans. In the estimation of Saxon, the 1957 ASC football team was "perhaps the best football squad in the school's history". Collectively outscoring its opponents 425–62 and winning four games with shutouts, it was the first team in school history to finish with a perfect season.

The back-to-back Junior Rose Bowl victories would be the greatest accomplishments of the ASC football program. After it became a four-year college in 1959, ASC was competing against stronger opponents. In 1963, the college began integrating its athletics teams with African American players for the first time while also joining the newly formed Southland Conference. Although not emphasized by college presidents, the football program was heavily subsidized, as were other athletics programs at ASC. Fan support at football games was considerable through the end of the 1960s, with capacity crowds of 10,000 being common until the on-campus stadium was demolished and home games were moved to Turnpike Stadium.

During the ASC era, the college's men's basketball team achieved only moderate success, competing in zone playoffs and post-season tournaments in both the Pioneer Conference and the Southland Conference but struggling to win the competitions. ASC also competed in intercollegiate men's golf, tennis, and track during this period. However, the college still did not have any women's intercollegiate team sports through the late 1960s.

ASC also created a men's swimming program under head coach Don Easterling during the mid-1960s. Most notable among its athletes were Doug Russell, a collegiate national champion who would go on to win a gold medal at the 1968 Summer Olympics, and Dashell Maines, who became the first woman to earn a varsity letter swimming on a men's collegiate team in Texas. Both a park and a street on the school's campus are named in honor of Russell. The mid-1960s additionally saw the creation of an intramural sports program at ASC, which included sports such as basketball, bowling, touch football, and tug of war.

== Sources ==
- Saxon, Gerald D. (1995). Transitions: A Centennial History of the University of Texas at Arlington, 1895–1995. Arlington, Texas: UTA Press. ISBN 0932408192. Archived from the original on June 22, 2019.
- Barker, Evelyn; Worcester, Lea (2015). University of Texas at Arlington. Charleston, South Carolina: Arcadia Publishing. ISBN 9781439649732. Archived from the original on August 30, 2021.
