= Axe (disambiguation) =

An axe is an implement with a blade, used as a tool and a weapon.

Axe may also refer to:

== Arts and entertainment ==
- Axe (film), a 1974 American horror film
- The Axe (film), a 2005 French film
- Axé (music), a form of Brazilian popular music
- Axe (band), an American rock band
- A.X.E.: Judgment Day, an American comic book crossover event
- The Axe (novel), by Ludvík Vaculík, 1966
- Sam Axe, a character in TV series Burn Notice

== People ==
=== Surname ===
- David Axe (born 1978), military correspondent
- Lisa Axe (fl. from 1995), American chemical engineer
- Samuel Axe, English 17th century privateer

=== Nickname ===
- David Axelrod or "Axe", advisor to US President Barack Obama
- Martin Axenrot or "Axe", Swedish drummer
- Larry Hennig or "The Axe" (1936–2018), professional wrestler
- Axe (gamer) (Jeffrey Williamson, born 1991), American esports player

== Science and technology ==
- AXE method (chemistry), to determine the geometry of simple molecules
- aXe Spectral Extraction, astronomical spectroscopic data extraction software
- AXE telephone exchange, by Ericsson
- Glaze3D, or Axe, a graphics card

== Other uses ==
- Axe (brand), a brand of men's grooming products
- Mahindra Axe, a military vehicle
- AirExplore, a Slovak charter airline, ICAO code AXE

== See also ==
- AX (disambiguation)
- Axed (disambiguation)
- Axes (disambiguation)
- Alpha Chi Sigma (ΑΧΣ), a professional fraternity specializing in the field of chemistry
- Paul Bunyan's Axe, a prize in college football
- Stanford Axe, a college football trophy
