= Axis of time =

Axis of time or time axis, may refer to:

- a representation of time as a parameter in classical mechanics, see Absolute space and time
- any representation of the events in chronological order, see Timeline
- Axis of Time (novel series), title of an alternative history trilogy (2004–2007) by John Birmingham
- The Time Axis (novel), a 1949 novel by Henry Kuttner serially published later collected as a single volume by Ace in 1965
- Time Axis, a fictional device from the 2010 videogame Doctor Who: Return to Earth

== See also ==
- List of timelines
- Chronology
- Timestream
- Time
- Axis (disambiguation)
- Axes (disambiguation)
