= Axxess =

Axxess may refer to:

- Axxess Technology Solutions, home healthcare company headquartered in Dallas, Texas.
- Axxess & Ace, a music album by Songs: Ohia
- Axxess (South Africa), a South African internet service provider
- Flight Design Axxess, a German hang glider design
- Nissan Axxess, a car
- WrestleMania Axxess, a professional wrestling event

== See also ==
- Axess (disambiguation)
- Access (disambiguation)
- Axes (disambiguation)
