= Axed =

Axed or axing may refer to:

- Use of an axe
- Cancellation (broadcasting), termination of a series or a character's story arc
- Dismissal (employment), termination against the employee's wishes, usually for reasons associated with the employee

== See also ==
- Axe (disambiguation)
