= Axess =

Axess may refer to:

- Axess magasin, Swedish magazine
- Axess TV, Swedish television channel
- Axess (CRS), Japanese computer reservations system
- Axess Vision Technology, medical device manufacturing company
- ENC Axess, a transit bus marketed in North America
- Oslo Axess, Norwegian stock exchange market

== See also ==
- Access (disambiguation)
- Axxess (disambiguation)
- Axes (disambiguation)
