= Jeff Idelson =

American baseball executive (born 1964)

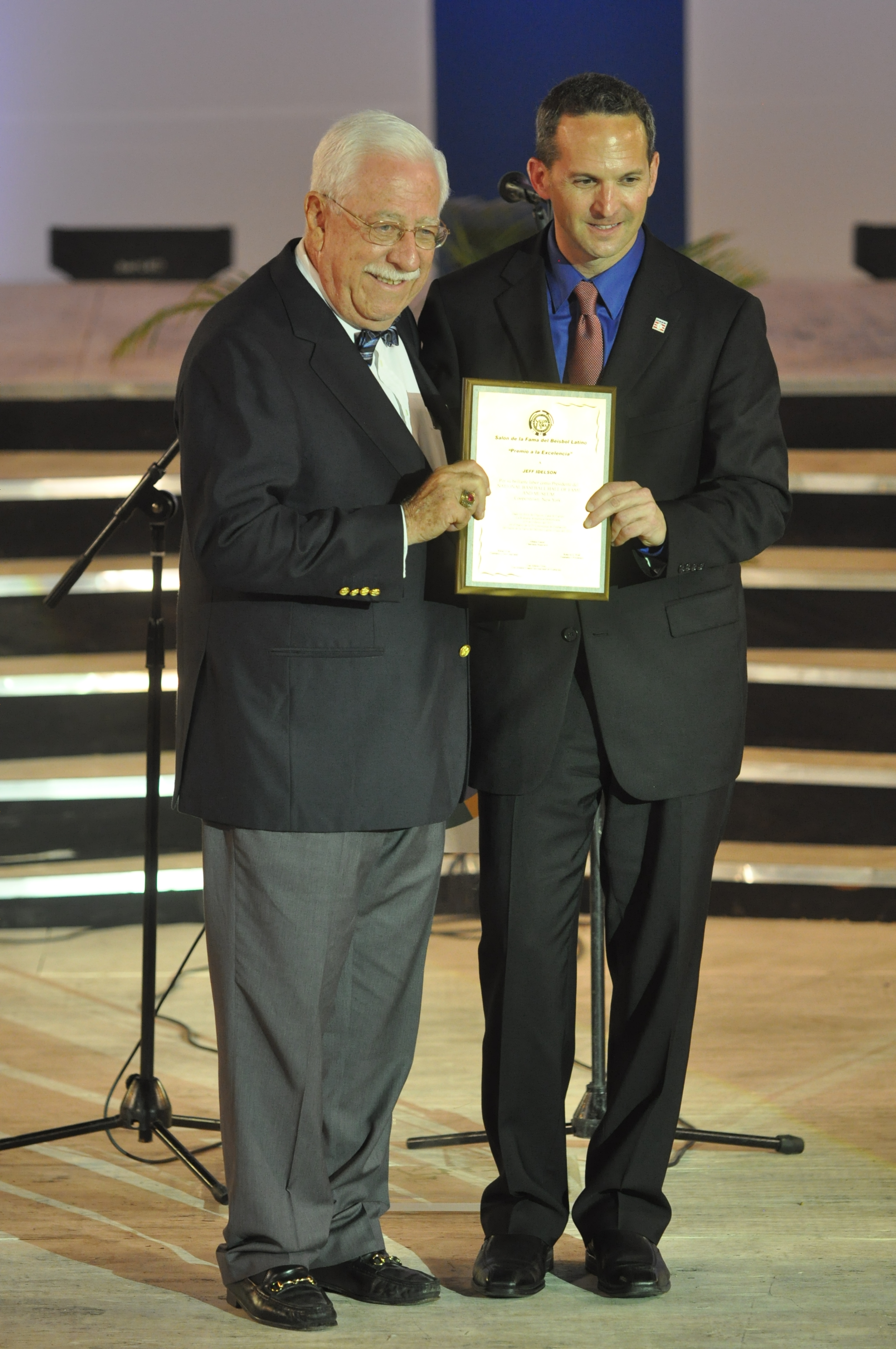
- Idelson (right) in 2013
- Born: Jeffrey L. Idelson; June 22, 1964 (age 62); West Newton, Massachusetts, U.S.
- Education: Connecticut College (BA)
- Title: President of the National Baseball Hall of Fame and Museum
- Term: 2008-2019; 2021
- Predecessor: Dale Petroskey
- Successor: Tim Mead

Jeffrey L. Idelson (born June 22, 1964) is an American baseball executive. He is the former president of the National Baseball Hall of Fame and Museum, a position he held from 2008 to 2019.

== Education and career ==
In 1986, Idelson graduated from Connecticut College in New London, Connecticut, with a Bachelor of Arts in International Economics. Idelson began his professional career as a vendor at Fenway Park in Boston while in junior high, high school, and college. He went on to be an intern in the Boston Red Sox public relations department in 1986, continuing to work in the team's public relations department from 1987-88. During that time, he also produced home games for the Red Sox Radio Network, serving as the flagship station's liaison to the Red Sox's primary charity, the Jimmy Fund. In 1989 he joined the Yankees in the same capacity. In 1994, Idelson also served as assistant Vice President and senior press officer for the 1994 World Cup organizing committee.

== Baseball Hall of Fame ==
Idelson joined the Baseball Hall of Fame on September 26, 1994, as director of public relations and promotions. He was named as the organization's vice president of communications and education in 1999, a role that includes overseeing the Hall of Fame elections and awards, communications, community and media relations, publications, public programs, promotions, advertising, and artifact acquisition. He also oversaw the museum's college internship program and education department.

He was named President of the Hall of Fame on April 16, 2008, replacing Dale Petroskey. On February 4, 2019 Idelson announced he would leave the Hall of Fame presidency on July 21, following the 2019 induction ceremony. After his successor Tim Mead stepped down in May 2021, he returned as "interim president" through the 2021 induction ceremony on September 8 of that year.

== Other work ==
Idelson serves on the Advisory Council of the Harlem branch of Reviving Baseball in Inner Cities, Board of Directors of the Professional Baseball Scouts Foundation, and on the Board of Directors of the Otsego County chapter of the international program Girls on the Run.
