= Access (Canadian TV program) =

- Genre: Public access
- Country of origin: Canada
- Original language: English
- No. of seasons: 8

Production
- Producers: Rita Deverell; Rob Parker; Ain Soodor; Myles White
- Running time: 30 minutes

Original release
- Network: CBC Television
- Release: 30 May 1974 – 16 October 1982

Access (sometimes called Take 30 Access and CBC Access) is a Canadian community television program that aired on CBC Television from 1974 to 1982, except 1981.

== Premise ==
The program offered airtime to Canadian organisations to inform Canadians of their concerns and opinions. Groups applied to the CBC for the opportunity to produce an episode of Access. Successful applicants were given assistance by CBC staff to develop their program in a four-week production time frame. Contents of the programs were subject to CBC policies regarding political promotion, fundraising and defamatory content, in addition to CRTC regulations.

== Scheduling and production ==
Access aired during the middle of each year, prior to the start of the fall programming season.

Year	Day of week	Dates		Air time	Producers
1974	Thursday	30 May	29 August	10:00 pm	Ain Soodor, Rob Parker
1975	Sunday	13 July	14 September	5:30 pm	Ain Soodor, Rob Parker
1976	Sunday	4 July	12 September	2:30 pm	Ain Soodor, Rob Parker
1977	Sunday	3 July	18 September	4:00 pm	Myles White, Rob Parker
1978	Sunday	9 July	24 September	12:00 pm	Myles White, Rita Deverell
1979	Sunday	17 June	19 August	2:00 pm	Myles White, Rita Deverell
1980	Monday	28 April	30 June	2:30 pm	Myles White, Rita Deverell
1982	Monday	17 May	16 October	3:30 pm	Myles White, Rita Deverell
