= Dale Petroskey =

American baseball executive (born 1955)

- Born: August 17, 1955 (age 71)
- Title: President of the National Baseball Hall of Fame and Museum
- Term: 1999-2008
- Predecessor: Donald C. Marr Jr.
- Successor: Jeff Idelson

Dale A. Petroskey (born August 17, 1955) is the former president and CEO of the Dallas Regional Chamber. He is also the former executive vice president of marketing for the Texas Rangers, a former executive of the National Baseball Hall of Fame and Museum and the National Geographic Society, and a former assistant press secretary of U.S. president Ronald Reagan.

== Early professional career ==
Petroskey graduated from Michigan State University in 1978, and worked in the White House from 1985 to March 1987 as assistant press secretary under Ronald Reagan. Before working for Reagan, he was assistant press secretary for the Michigan House Republican caucus, then chief of staff for Representative William F. Goodling, a Republican from Pennsylvania. After serving Reagan, he was assistant secretary of public affairs at the United States Department of Transportation under Secretary Elizabeth Dole. Then, he served as a senior executive at the National Geographic Society from 1988 to 1999.

== National Baseball Hall of Fame and Museum ==
Petroskey was elected to president of the National Baseball Hall of Fame and Museum on June 15, 1999. During his tenure as the President of the Hall, Petroskey was credited with expanding membership and fundraising, furthering educational efforts and outreach, and establishing a closer relationship with the business of baseball (which is to say, Major League Baseball itself) with which the Hall had not always been on the best of terms. Under his leadership, the Hall embarked on a major renovation and modernization, which was completed in 2005 at a cost of $20 million.

He has also been credited for the Hall's early 2000s initiatives to increase and further recognition of the contributions of Negro league players, managers, and executives, continuing an effort first broached by Hall of Famer—and Negro leaguer-- Jackie Robinson. A five-year program resulted in the elevation of 17 Negro leaguers to members of the Hall of Fame in 2006. He was president during the 2007 induction ceremony, which saw a record-breaking crowd of over 82,000 people in Cooperstown, as well as the 1999 ceremony which saw 50,000 people, tied for second-most ever.

=== "Bull Durham" censorship controversy ===
In April 2003, one month after the start of the Iraq War, Petroskey caused a furor when he canceled an event meant to commemorate the 15th anniversary of the well-known 1988 baseball movie Bull Durham because of the anti-war stance of two of its stars, Tim Robbins and Susan Sarandon.

Petroskey, a former assistant press secretary in the Reagan administration, sent Robbins and Sarandon a letter that said: "We believe your very public criticism of President Bush at this important - and sensitive - time in our nation's history helps undermine the U.S. position, which ultimately could put our troops in even more danger." Robbins responded: "Long live democracy, free speech and the '69 Mets - all improbable, glorious miracles that I have always believed in."

Many people, including well-known baseball figures like authors Roger Kahn and Jules Tygiel, were upset by what they saw as an attempt to punish political speech. Kahn canceled an appearance at the Hall and Tygiel called for Petroskey's resignation.

Bull Durham co-star Kevin Costner defended Robbins and Sarandon, saying, "I think Tim and Susan's courage is the type of courage that makes our democracy work... Pulling back this invite is against the whole principle about what we fight for and profess to be about."

=== Resignation from Hall of Fame presidency ===
Petroskey tendered his resignation under pressure on March 25, 2008, for "fail[ing] to exercise proper fiduciary responsibility" while making "judgments that were not in the best interest of the National Baseball Hall of Fame and Museum." He was replaced by vice president Jeff Idelson.
