= Dallas Regional Chamber =

Chamber of Commerce

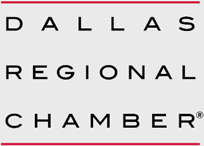
- Founded: 1909
- Type: Advocacy group
- Purpose: Business advocacy
- Location: Dallas, Texas
- Region served: (United States) North Texas
- Method: Policy advocacy, member engagement
- Key people: Dale Petroskey (President & CEO)
- Website: Dallas Regional Chamber Official Website

The Dallas Regional Chamber, formerly known as the Dallas Chamber of Commerce and the Greater Dallas Chamber of Commerce—is a chamber of commerce that represents businesses and institutions in North Texas, including the Dallas/Fort Worth metropolitan area.

== History ==
The Dallas Regional Chamber was founded in 1909 as a combination of three smaller organizations: the Commercial Club (founded in 1893), the 150,000 Club, and the Freight Bureau—and the Dallas Board of Trade, established in 1874.

The Dallas Regional Chamber is supported by roughly 3,000 businesses and organizations across twelve counties, and its members represent nearly 600,000 area employees. The chamber's mission statement:

The Dallas Regional Chamber promotes prosperity through public policy, economic development and member engagement.

The chamber is led by a board of roughly 100 business executives. In 2020, the chairman of the board is John Olajide, founder and CEO of Axxess; the chairman-elect for 2021 is Michelle Vopni, Dallas Office Managing Partner, Ernst & Young, LLP.

Dale Petroskey has served as president of the Dallas Regional Chamber since April 2014. Mr. Petroskey is the former Executive Vice President of Marketing for the Texas Rangers baseball club. He is a former executive of the National Baseball Hall of Fame and Museum and the National Geographic Society, and a former political appointee in the administration of United States President Ronald Reagan.

Recent notable speakers before the Dallas Regional Chamber include Federal Reserve Chairman Ben Bernanke, Microsoft CEO Steve Ballmer, former United States Secretary of State James Baker, and Dallas Mayor Tom Leppert.
