= UT Arlington Mavericks women's basketball =

American college basketball program

Texas–Arlington Mavericks women's basketball
2026–27 UT Arlington Mavericks women's basketball team
- University: University of Texas at Arlington
- Head coach: Shereka Wright (7th season)
- Location: Arlington, Texas
- Arena: College Park Center (capacity: 7,000)
- Conference: UAC
- Nickname: Mavericks
- Colors: Royal blue, white, and orange

NCAA Division I tournament appearances
- 2005, 2007, 2022

Conference tournament champions
- 2005, 2007, 2022

Conference regular-season champions
- 2005, 2007, 2009, 2019

Uniforms
Home	Away

The UT Arlington Mavericks women's basketball team is an NCAA Division I college basketball team competing in the United Athletic Conference and representing the University of Texas at Arlington. Home games are played at College Park Center, located on the university's campus in Arlington, Texas. The team appeared in the 2005 NCAA tournament, losing to #4 seed Texas Tech in the first round, 69–49, and the 2007 NCAA tournament, dropping their first round game to #4 seed Texas A&M 58–50.

The team has also made three postseason appearances in the NIT, the first in 1998 as an at-large, the second in 2009, and most recently as another at-large bid in 2017.

In 2018–19, the Mavericks finished in a tie for the Sun Belt regular season title. UTA played in the WNIT again, winning their first-round game against Stephen F. Austin, the first postseason win in program history.

== Team history ==
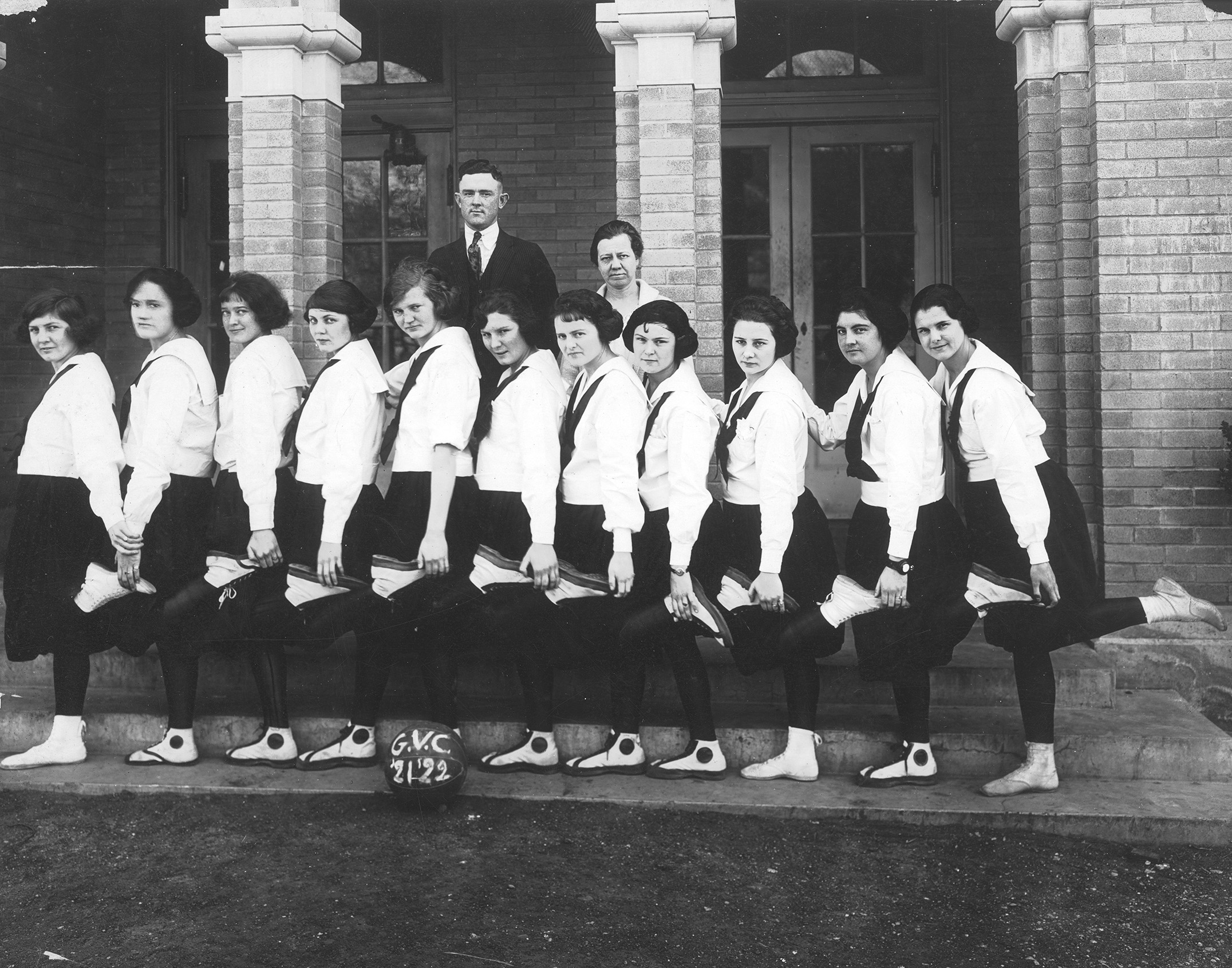
Grubbs Vocational College women's basketball team, circa 1921

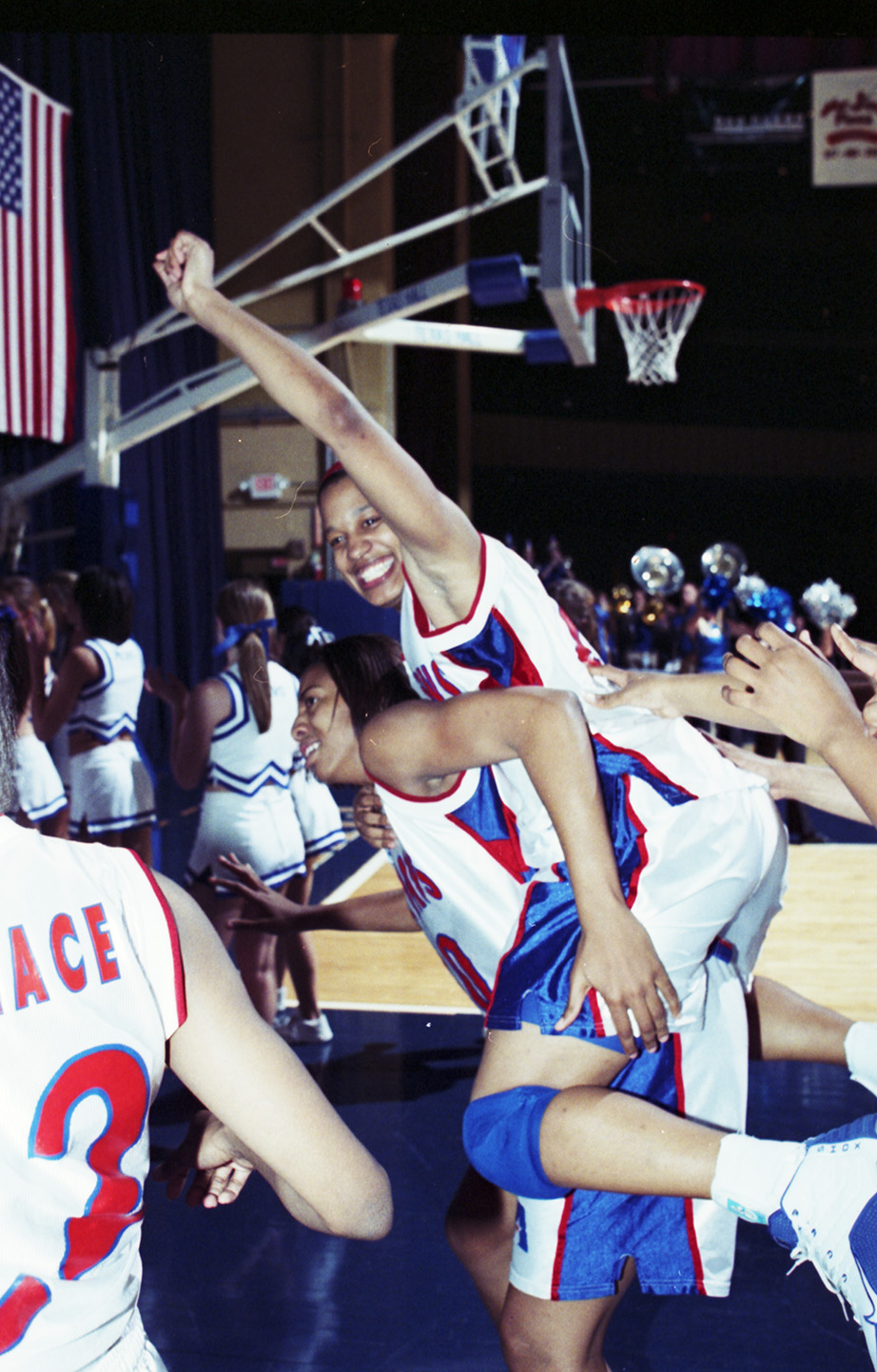
UT Arlington celebrating a victory at Texas Hall in 2005

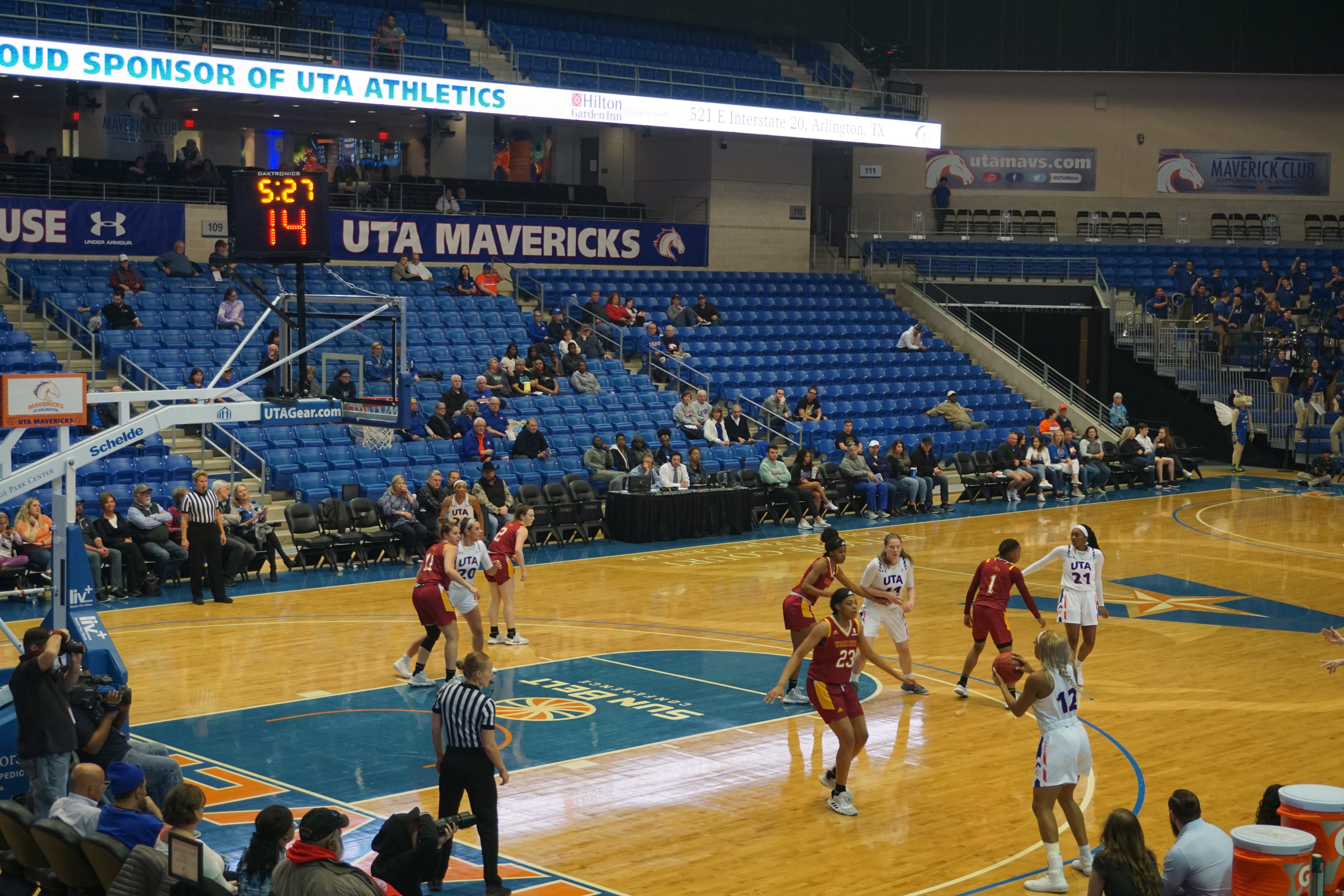
UT Arlington in action against Louisiana–Monroe

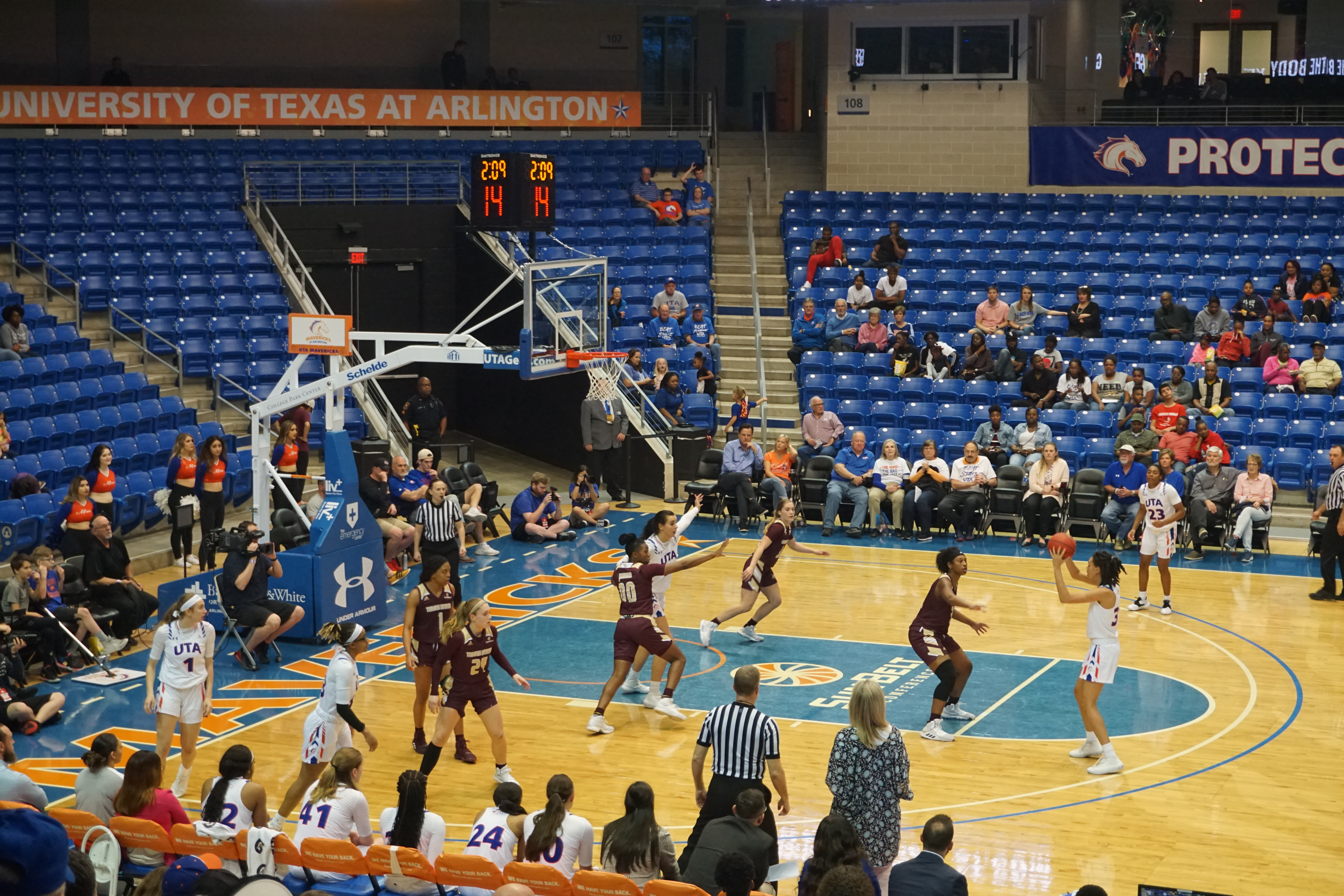
UT Arlington in action in the 2020 Sun Belt Conference women's basketball tournament

The Mavericks began their first year of play in the 1972–73 season in the Association for Intercollegiate Athletics for Women. Legendary coach Jody Conradt joined the Mavericks in their second year, and was head coach for three years.

When all women's sports joined the NCAA and began play in the same conferences as the men's sports, UTA began competing in the Southland Conference in 1982–83. Since then, they have won three regular season titles and two tournament titles. They have finished as the regular season runner-up four times and have been the tournament runner-up twice.

UTA joined the Western Athletic Conference (rebranded as the United Athletic Conference in July 2026) for the 2012–13 season. It was a short stint, as UTA joined the Sun Belt Conference July 1, 2013. After nine athletic seasons, UTA rejoined the WAC on July 1, 2023.

== Facilities ==
Until February 2012, the Mavericks played at Texas Hall, a 3,300-seat theater on the campus. The teams played on the stage, and fans could watch the game from either the theater seats or the bleacher section.

A new arena called the College Park Center with a seating capacity of 7,000 hosted the final four regular-season home games for the team in 2012. The facility is located on the eastern side of the campus along with new housing, parking, and retail developments.

The Mavericks did not initially have a home court advantage at CPC, as UTA sported a 24–39 record at the end of the 2015–16 season. Since then, the team has made a CPC a much harder place to visit, posting winning home records every year since then, 72–23 overall. As of the conclusion of the 2022–23 season, UTA is 96–62, a winning percentage of .608.

== Coaches ==
The Mavericks have had 10 coaches, listed below, in their 51-year history. Shereka Wright is the current coach. Her first full season began in October 2020. She is currently in her sixth season as the Mavericks's head coach.

- Carla Lowry – 1973–1973 (1 season)
- Jody Conradt – 1973–1976 (3 seasons)
- Cindy Salser – 1976–1979 (3 seasons)
- Connie Kelch – 1979–1989 (10 seasons)
- Jerry Isler – 1989–1992 (3 seasons)
- Mike Dean – 1992–2000 (8 seasons)
- Donna Capps – 2000–2007 (7 seasons)
- Samantha Morrow – 2007–2013 (5 seasons)
- Krista Gerlich – 2013–2020 (7 seasons)
- Shereka Wright – 2020–present

== Postseason results ==
=== NCAA tournament results ===
The Mavericks have appeared in three NCAA Tournaments, with a combined record of 0–3.

Year	Seed	Round	Opponent	Result
2005	#13	First Round	#4 Texas Tech	L 49–69
2007	#13	First Round	#4 Texas A&M	L 50–58
2022	#14	First Round	#3 Iowa State	L 71–78

=== NIT results ===
The Mavericks have appeared in the Women's National Invitation Tournament (WNIT) four times. Their combined record is 1–4.

Year	Round	Opponent	Result
1999	First Round	Baylor	L 60–71
2009	First Round	Oklahoma St	L 72–82
2017	First Round	Tulane	L 57–62
2019	First Round; Second Round	Stephen F. Austin; TCU	W 60–54; L 54–71
2025	First Round; Second Round	Incarnate Word; North Texas	W 78–52; L 67–78

== Season-by-season results ==
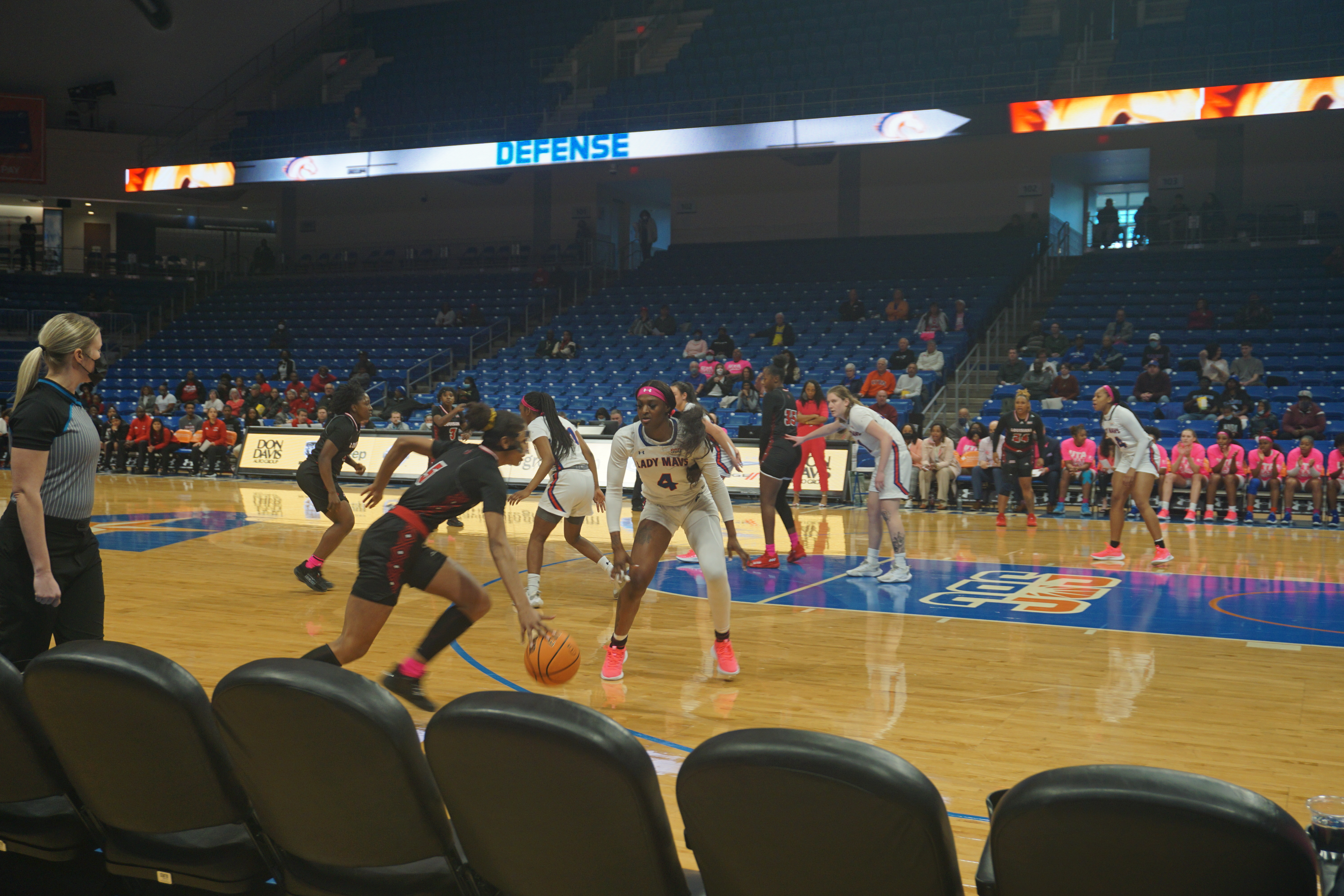
UT Arlington in action against Louisiana

Record table
Season	Coach	Overall	Conference	Standing	Postseason
Carla Lowry (independent) (1973–1973)
1973	Lowry	3–7			
Carla Lowry:		3–7 (.300)			
Jody Conradt (independent) (1973–1976)
1973–1974	Conradt	9–14			
1974–1975	Conradt	11–14			
1975–1976	Conradt	23–11			
Jody Conradt:		43–39 (.524)			
Cindy Salser (independent) (1976–1979)
1976–1977	Salser	20–11			
1977–1978	Salser	21–10			
1978–1979	Salser	10–17			
Cindy Salser:		51–38 (.573)			
Connie Kelch (independent) (1979–1982)
1979–1980	Kelch	12–16			
1980–1981	Kelch	18–18			
1981–1982	Kelch	20–17			
Connie Kelch:		50–51 (.495)			
Connie Kelch (Southland Conference) (1982–1989)
1982–1983	Kelch	10–17	1–4	T-4th	
1983–1984	Kelch	14–14	5–7	5th	
1984–1985	Kelch	13–14	8–4	2nd	
1985–1986	Kelch	11–15	5–5	4th	
1986–1987	Kelch	8–18	3–9	6th	
1987–1988	Kelch	5–22	3–12	8th	
1988–1989	Kelch	6–21	1–13	8th	
Connie Kelch:		67–121 (.356)	25–54 (.316)		
Jerry Isler (Southland Conference) (1989–1992)
1989–1990	Isler	11–17	7–7	T-4th	
1990–1991	Isler	13–15	8–6	T-3rd	
1991–1992	Isler	18–11	12–6	4th	
Jerry Isler:		42–43 (.494)	27–19 (.587)		
Mike Dean (Southland Conference) (1992–2000)
1992–1993	Dean	11–16	7–11	6th	
1993–1994	Dean	14–13	11–7	5th	
1994–1995	Dean	10–17	9–9	7th	
1995–1996	Dean	14–13	9–9	T-5th	
1996–1997	Dean	17–11	11–5	T-2nd	
1997–1998	Dean	18–9	11–5	3rd	
1998–1999	Dean	18–11	12–6	T-2nd	WNIT 1st Round
1999–2000	Dean	13–15	9–9	6th	
Mike Dean:		115–105 (.523)	79–61 (.564)		
Donna Capps (Southland Conference) (2000–2007)
2000–2001	Capps	6–21	4–12	10th	
2001–2002	Capps	14–15	12–8	4th	
2002–2003	Capps	15–13	13–7	5th	
2003–2004	Capps	19–12	11–5	3rd	
2004–2005	Capps	21–10	13–3	T-1st	NCAA 1st Round
2005–2006	Capps	20–9	13–3	2nd	
2006–2007	Capps	24–9	16–0	1st	NCAA 1st Round
Donna Capps:		119–89 (.572)	82–38 (.683)		
Samantha Morrow (Southland Conference) (2007–2012)
2007–2008	Morrow	19–10	13–3	2nd	
2008–2009	Morrow	22–11	14–2	T-1st	WNIT 1st Round
2009–2010	Morrow	15–16	9–7	6th	
2010–2011	Morrow	8–20	5–11	T-8th	
2011–2012	Morrow	8–21	4–12	11th	
Samantha Morrow (Western Athletic Conference) (2012–2013)
2012–2013	Morrow	7–23	4–14	T-9th	
Samantha Morrow:		79–101 (.439)	49–49 (.500)		
Krista Gerlich (Sun Belt Conference) (2013–2020)
2013–2014	Gerlich	4–25	3–15	10th	
2014–2015	Gerlich	17–13	11–9	T-4th	
2015–2016	Gerlich	15–16	10–10	6th	
2016–2017	Gerlich	22–9	14–4	2nd	WNIT 1st Round
2017–2018	Gerlich	18–12	12–6	T-3rd	
2018–2019	Gerlich	24–8	15–3	1st	WNIT 2nd Round
2019–2020	Gerlich	21–11	14–4	3rd	
Krista Gerlich:		121–94 (.563)	79–51 (.608)		
Shereka Wright (Sun Belt Conference) (2020–2022)
2020–2021	Wright	13–7	11–4	2nd West	
2021–2022	Wright	20–8	11–4	2nd	NCAA 1st Round
Shereka Wright (Western Athletic Conference) (2022–present)
2022–2023	Wright	14–17	8–10	T-8th	
2023–24	Wright	17–16	11–9	5th	
Shereka Wright:		64–48 (.571)	41–27 (.603)		
Total:		754–736 (.506)			
National champion Postseason invitational champion Conference regular season champion Conference regular season and conference tournament champion Division regular season champion Division regular season and conference tournament champion Conference tournament champion
