= Access 5 =

Access 5 was a national project run by NASA in collaboration with industry, the Federal Aviation Administration (FAA), and the United States Department of Defense (DoD), in order to introduce high altitude, long endurance (HALE) remotely operated aircraft (ROA) for routine flights in the National Airspace System (NAS). It was the first project in the United States to formally attempt to integrated unmanned aircraft into the national airspace system (NAS). The primary objective was to open up airspace for commercial unmanned aviation. Access 5 commenced in May 2004 and was slated to run for five years. The project received initial funding in the amount of $101M from NASA and guarantees of support from the ROA industry. It was managed out of Dryden Flight Research Center. The program was managed by Jeff Bauer out of NASA Dryden and R. Scott Dann, a General Atomics program manager who filled the role of industry director. R. Scott Dann was also the founder and first president of the UAV National Industry Team (UNITE). A good portion of the leadership on the Access 5 program were involved in the NASA ERAST (Environment Research and Sensor Technology) program, another pioneering program in UAS development.

The goal of Access 5 was to enable what government and industry leaders believe will ultimately be a robust civil and commercial market for HALE ROA. The current lack of ready access to the NAS inhibits investment in ROA commercialization and the ability of users to obtain cost-effective ROA services. Access 5 seeks to remove the barriers to aviation's most compelling new offering in decades. Access 5 was the first organized effort to advanced UAVs into the national airspace system (NAS). The members of the Access 5 project developed the first comprehensive plan for the integration of UAS into the NAS. The plan included all the tasks that would have to be accomplished in four categories, 1.) UAS Technology, 2.) Aviation Infrastructure, 3.) Policy and Regulation, and 4.) Implementation. The plan was later resurrected in the first FAA UAS Aviation Rule Committee. The work conducted by UNITE/Access 5 was pioneering and the precursors to all future efforts to introduce UAS into the NAS including the formation of the first FAA UAS Aviation Rule Committee (ARC) led by Jim Williams (FAA) and chaired by R. Scott Dann (General Atomics).

The project was terminated on February 28, 2006, after a reorganization of NASA's research programs to focus on returning man kind to the Moon. The cancellation of the program led members of the UAV National Industry Team (UNITE) alliance, which includes Boeing, General Atomics, Lockheed Martin, Northrop Grumman, AeroVironment, and Aurora Flight Sciences to advocate for a new national plan in testimony before the United States Congress.
