= Lisa Axe =

American chemical engineer

Lisa B. Axe is an American chemical and environmental engineer who chairs the Otto H. York Department of Chemical and Materials Engineering at the New Jersey Institute of Technology, where she is a professor. Her research concerns surface chemistry, contamination, and applications of chemical engineering to environmental systems.

== Education and career ==
Axe is a 1984 graduate of Purdue University. After working in industry for several years, she went to the Illinois Institute of Technology for graduate study, earning a master's degree in environmental engineering in 1992 and completing her Ph.D. in 1995, at the same time earning a second master's degree in chemical engineering. During her studies at the Illinois Institute of Technology, she also worked as a researcher and environmental engineer at the Argonne National Laboratory.

In 1995, Axe joined the New Jersey Institute of Technology as an assistant professor. She was promoted to associate professor in 2000 and to full professor in 2006, served as associate dean from 2009 to 2015, and became department chair in 2015. As well as her appointment in the Department of Chemical and Materials Engineering at the New Jersey Institute of Technology, she is also affiliated with the Department of Civil and Environmental Engineering there, and with the NJIT Institute for Future Technologies.
