= Rita Deverell =

Canadian TV broadcaster and social activist (born 1945)

Rita Deverell CM
- Born: Rita Shelton; 1945 (age 80–81); Houston, Texas, US
- Other names: Rita Shelton Deverell
- Occupations: TV broadcaster; social activist
- Known for: Co-founding Vision TV
- Awards: 2 Geminis; ACTRA Woman of the Year

Rita Shelton Deverell CM (born 1945 to Versie and Hugh Shelton) is a Canadian television broadcaster and social activist, who was one of the founders of the Canadian television channel Vision TV. She also served as news director for the Aboriginal Peoples Television Network from 2002 to 2005.

Born in Houston, Texas, Deverell moved to Canada in 1967, and began her television career in 1972 as the producer of a children's television program. In 1974, she joined CBC Television as a journalist, including a stint with the program Take 30. In 1983, she left to become a journalism professor at the University of Regina, and in 1988 she left there to become one of the founders of Vision TV. In addition to working as an executive with Vision TV, she also hosted numerous interstitial segments between programs, and was noted for often wearing a flower in her hair when hosting these segments. She has also been a board member of Obsidian Theatre Company, a Toronto company which specializes in black Canadian drama.

In 2021 she was named the chancellor of Lakehead University.

== Awards ==
- Deverell has been named to the Maclean's Honour Roll of Outstanding Canadians, and to the Canadian Association of Broadcasters Hall of Fame.
- She was named a member of the Order of Canada in 2005.
- She was named ACTRA's Woman of the Year in 2018.
- She has been awarded two Geminis
- She was awarded the Governor General's Performing Arts Award in 2022.

== Works ==
Rita has written one book, American Refugees: Turning to Canada for Freedom.
