= Axes =

Axes, plural of axe and of axis, may refer to

- Axes (album), a 2005 rock album by the British band Electrelane
- a possibly still empty plot (graphics)

== See also ==
- Axis (disambiguation)
- Axess (disambiguation)
- Axxess (disambiguation)
