= Axxess Technology Solutions =

- Type: Private
- Industry: Technology
- Founded: 2007
- Headquarters: Dallas, TX, U.S.
- Area served: United States
- Key people: John Olajide (CEO)
- Products: Medical software
- Number of employees: 250
- Website: axxess.com

Axxess Technology Solutions (or simply, Axxess) is a home healthcare software provider and consulting firm based in Dallas, Texas. Axxess produces a cloud-based software designed to facilitate administrative function and management at home healthcare firms throughout the United States. The company provides software to nearly 7,000 home healthcare agencies which are composed of more than 250,000 users and nearly 1.5 million patients.

== History ==
Founder John Olajide had worked as a health care technology consultant during his time at the University of Texas at Dallas, created Axxess as a home healthcare consulting firm in 2007. The company remained exclusively a consulting firm until 2011 when they started offering software designed to facilitate administrative functions for home healthcare organizations. By 2013, they counted over 700 home healthcare agencies (including RBA Texas Group) as clients with 20,000 healthcare professionals and over 100,000 patients under their wing. In 2014, the company released a mobile app for both iOS and Android devices. Axxess acquired Home Health Gold in 2018.

== Products and services ==
Screenshot of Axxess Technology Solutions software in test mode.

The primary product offered by Axxess is a cloud-based software. The cloud software is also linked to the Axxess mobile app allowing nurses to update patient files or view medication guides from any mobile device. The software is also equipped with precise Electronic Visit Verification (EVV) that employs GPS technology. The company also provides services like consultation, client service, education, and hands-on IT assistance.
