= Akın =

Akın (pronounced [ˈakɯn]) is a masculine given name and surname of Turkish origin. Notable people with the name include:

== Given name ==
- Akın Akınözü (born 1990), Turkish actor
- Akın Alkan (born 1989), Turkish footballer
- Akın Altıok (born 1932), Turkish triple jumper
- Akın Birdal (born 1948), Turkish politician
- Akın Eldes (born 1962), Turkish guitarist
- Akın Gürlek (born 1982), Turkish jurist and politician
- Akın İpek (born 1963), Turkish businessman
- Akın Kuloğlu (1972–2001), Georgian-Turkish boxer
- Akın Öngör (born 1945), Turkish business executive
- Akın Öztürk (born 1952), Turkish general
- Akın Ünver (born 1982), Turkish academic
- Akın Vardar (born 1978), Turkish footballer

== Surname ==
- Azra Akın (born 1981), Turkish model
- Bülent Akın (born 1978), Turkish footballer
- Çağla Akın (born 1995), Turkish volleyball player
- Can Akın (born 1983), Turkish basketball player
- Cenan Akın (1932–2006), Turkish composer, conductor, and music educator
- Didem Akın (born 1971), Turkish basketball coach and player
- Fatih Akın (born 1973), Turkish film director
- Filiz Akın (1943–2025), Turkish film actress, writer, and television presenter
- Gülten Akın (1933–2015), Turkish poet
- İbrahim Akın (footballer) (born 1984), Turkish footballer
- Nazan Akın (born 1983), Turkish Paralympic judoka
- Özge Akın (born 1985), Turkish sprinter
- Şenol Akın (born 1984), Turkish footballer
- Serhat Akın (born 1981), Turkish footballer
- Sunay Akın (born 1962), Turkish journalist, writer, and poet

== See also ==
- Akin (disambiguation)
