= Axis =

An axis (pl.: axes) may refer to:

== Mathematics ==
- A specific line (often a directed line) that plays an important role in some contexts. In particular:
  - Coordinate axis of a coordinate system
    - x-axis, y-axis, z-axis, common names for the coordinate axes of a Cartesian coordinate system
  - Axis of rotation
  - Axis of symmetry
  - Axis of a conic section

== Politics ==
- Axis powers of World War II, 1936–1945.
- Axis of evil (first used in 2002), U.S. President George W. Bush's description of Iran, Iraq, and North Korea
- Axis of Resistance (first used in 2002), the Shia alliance of Iran, Hezbollah, and the Houthis
- Axis of Upheaval (first used in 2024), foreign policy neologism of the Anti-western collaboration between Russia, China, Iran, and North Korea
- Jakarta-Pyongyang-Peking Axis, diplomatic alignment and alliance between Indonesia, China, and North Korea during Sukarno's Presidency
- Political spectrum, sometimes called an axis

== Science ==
- Axis (anatomy), the second cervical vertebra of the spine
- Axis (genus), a genus of deer
- Axis (journal), online journal published by The Mineralogical Record
- Axis mundi, astronomical term for the rotational axis of the celestial sphere
- Axis, a botanical term meaning the line through the centre of a plant
- Axis, an anatomical term of orientation
- Gut–brain axis, biochemical signaling between the gastrointestinal tract and central nervous system
- Hypothalamic–pituitary axis, relationship between neuroendocrine hormones and a specific end organ
- Optical axis, a line of rotational symmetry

== Technology ==
- Apache Axis, a web-service framework from Apache Software Foundation
- Yahoo! Axis, a mobile web browser

== Arts, entertainment, and media ==
=== Music ===
- Axis: Bold as Love (1967), an album by The Jimi Hendrix Experience
- Axis (Paul Bley album) (1977)
- Axis (Pegz album) (2005)
- "Axis" (song), by Pet Shop Boys (2013)

=== Other uses in arts, entertainment, and media ===
- AXIS (comics), "Avengers & X-Men: AXIS" (2014), a Marvel Comics storyline
- Axis Amerika, the name of two teams of super-villains who have appeared in DC Comics
- Axis, an asteroid in the Gundam science fiction media franchise
- Axis (film), a 2017 drama directed by Aisha Tyler
- Axis (novel), a 2007 science-fiction novel by Robert Charles Wilson
- AXIS Dance Company, a professional contemporary dance company and dance education organization in Oakland, California, U.S.
- Axis, a major character in the video game Undertale Yellow
- Luthen Rael, a Star Wars character from Andor code-named Axis

== Brands and enterprises ==
- Axis Bank, a private sector bank in India
- AXIS Capital, a Bermuda-based and global operating reinsurer
- Axis Communications, a Swedish manufacturer of IP cameras
- AXIS Flight Training Systems, an Austrian-based manufacturer of flight simulators
- Axis Percussion, a drum-related manufacturer
- Axis Records (disambiguation), several music labels
- Axis Telecom, a national GSM mobile operator in Indonesia
- PH Live, a Las Vegas resort/casino concert venue named The AXIS from December 2013 to February 2018

== Other uses ==
- Axis, Alabama, an unincorporated area in the United States

== See also ==
- Axis system of harmonic analysis
- Axes (disambiguation)
- Axial (disambiguation)
- Axios (disambiguation)
- Axis 2 (disambiguation)
- Axius (disambiguation)
