= Axiality =

Axiality may refer to:

- Axiality (geometry), a measure of the axial symmetry of a two-dimensional shape
- Axiality and rhombicity in mathematics, measures of the directional symmetry of a three-dimensional tensor
- Axiality, a principle behind the art and poetry of George Quasha
- Axiality in architecture, organization around a strong central axis, especially in the architecture of cathedrals and great churches and Beaux-Arts architecture

== See also ==
- Axial (disambiguation)
