= TCG Akın =

TCG Akın is the name of the following ships of the Turkish Navy:

- TCG Akın (A 585), ex-USS Greenlet, a submarine rescue ship acquired in 1970 and decommissioned in 2017
- TCG Akın (A 584), a rescue and salvage ship commissioned in 2017

== See also ==
- Akın
