= Vardar (disambiguation) =

Vardar, also known as Axios, is a river in North Macedonia and Greece.

Vardar may also refer to:

== People ==
- Ahmet Vardar, Turkish journalist
- Akın Vardar, Turkish footballer
- Emel Vardar, Turkish artist
- Sertan Vardar, Turkish football player

== Places ==
- Vardar Banovina, a province of the Kingdom of Yugoslavia between 1929 and 1941
- Vardar Macedonia, an area in the north of the Macedonia region
- Vardar Metro Station, Sofia, Bulgaria
- Vardar Statistical Region
- Vardar Yenicesi or Giannitsa, a town and a former municipality in Pella regional unit, Greece

== Sports ==
- FK Vardar, a football club in Skopje, North Macedonia
- KK Vardar, a basketball club in Skopje, North Macedonia
- RK Vardar, a men's handball club in Skopje, North Macedonia
- ŽRK Vardar, a women's handball club in Skopje, North Macedonia

== Other uses ==
- Lower Vardar dialect, a South Slavic dialect
- Vardar Army, Ottoman Empire

== See also ==
- Axios (disambiguation)
