= Kafi (disambiguation) =

Kafi is a classical form of Sufi poetry

Kafi may also refer to:

- Kafi (raga), a raga in Hindustani classical music
- Kafi (thaat), a thaat in Hindustani classical music named after the raga
- Kafi, a 2002 musical album by Turkish musician Akin Eldes
- Ali Kafi (1928–2013), President of Algeria (1992–1994)
- Kitab al-Kafi, a major Shi'a Islamic hadith collection
- Kāfi (كافي) is a name for a movement in Kuwait and another independent movement in Iraq
