= Pinhani =

Turkish alternative rock band

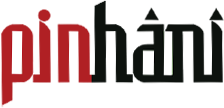

Background information
- Origin: Istanbul, Turkey
- Genres: Alternative rock
- Years active: 2004–present
- Labels: Beğeni, Piccatura, Dokuz Sekiz
- Website: www.pinhani.com

Pinhâni is a Turkish alternative rock band. It was founded on 5 April 2004 by two cousins Sinan Kaynakçı and Zeynep Eylül Üçer as a modern rock band in Turkey. Pinhani have released several albums. Pinhani also made the soundtrack for the Turkish TV Series 'Kavak Yelleri'.

== Members ==
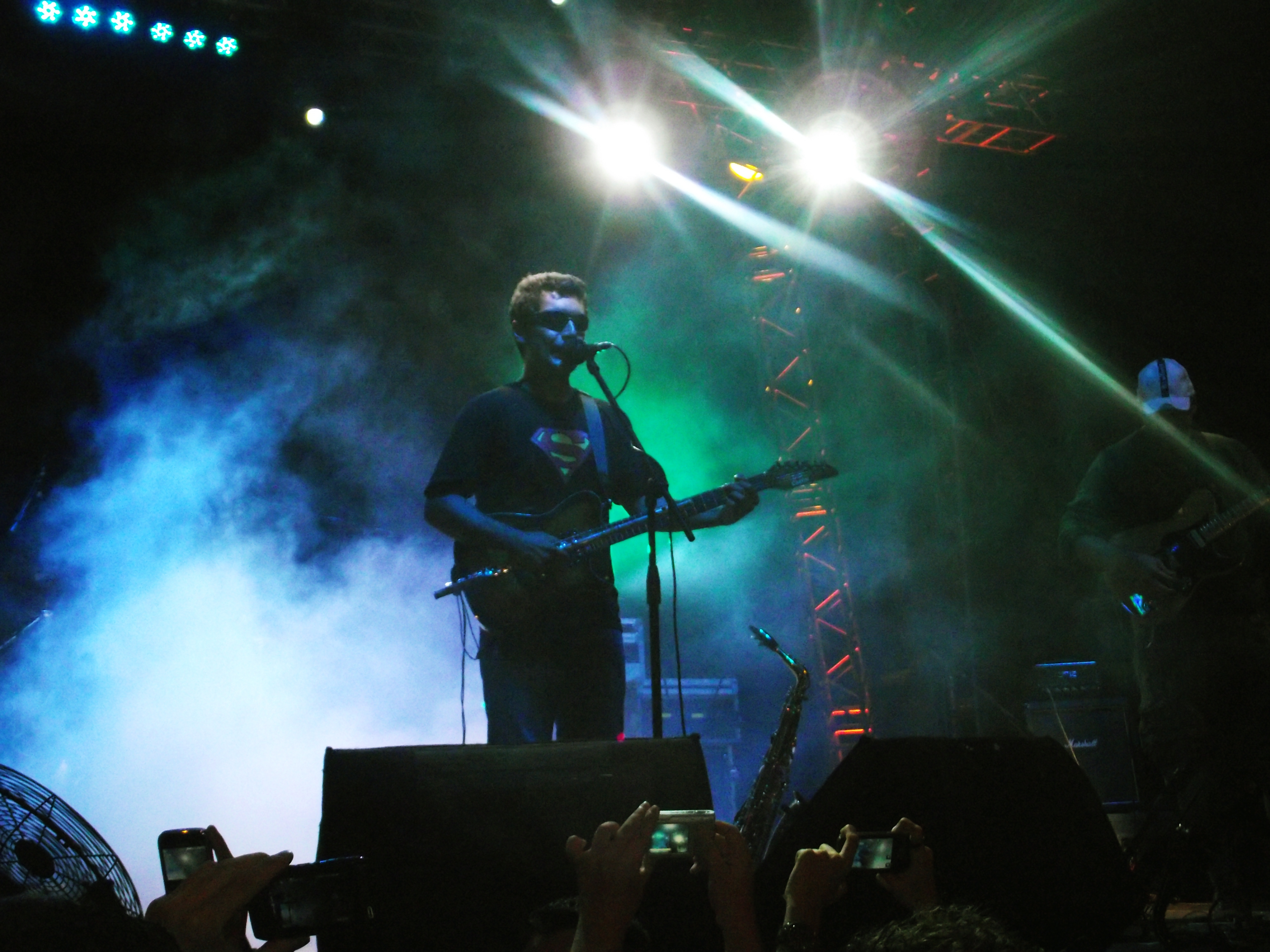
Sinan Kaynakçı

=== Sinan Kaynakçı ===
Vocalist, guitarist, wind instruments

He was born on December 25, 1979, in Istanbul, Turkey. He spent his childhood in Florya and Bakırköy. He first got involved with music while attending Cağaloğlu Anatolian High School, later graduating in 1998. In 1995, he took sideflute lessons -the same year, he started playing the guitar. In 1996, he also began taking drum lessons at studio "Hip hop". Between the years 2001–2003, he gave several concerts with "Van Basten" at various venues in Taksim/Beyoğlu. During that time, he also started to write his own song lyrics. He broke up with the group that he was performing with, owing to different aims. At the end of 2004, he had a once-in-a-lifetime opportunity to get up close and personal with Akın Eldes whom he had been listening to for years as a strong fan. During the year 2005, he started recording his first album, İnandıgım Masallar. On both of Pinhani's albums, he played an important role as a vocalist and songwriter as he is the one who writes the lyrics and composes the songs. In concert, he enriches his contribution to the band by playing other instruments. In addition to these, he also plays the bass guitar for Akın Eldes's trio from time to time. His talent is not limited to that, he can play the drums, wired, wind instruments and also makes an effort to still play other instruments as well.

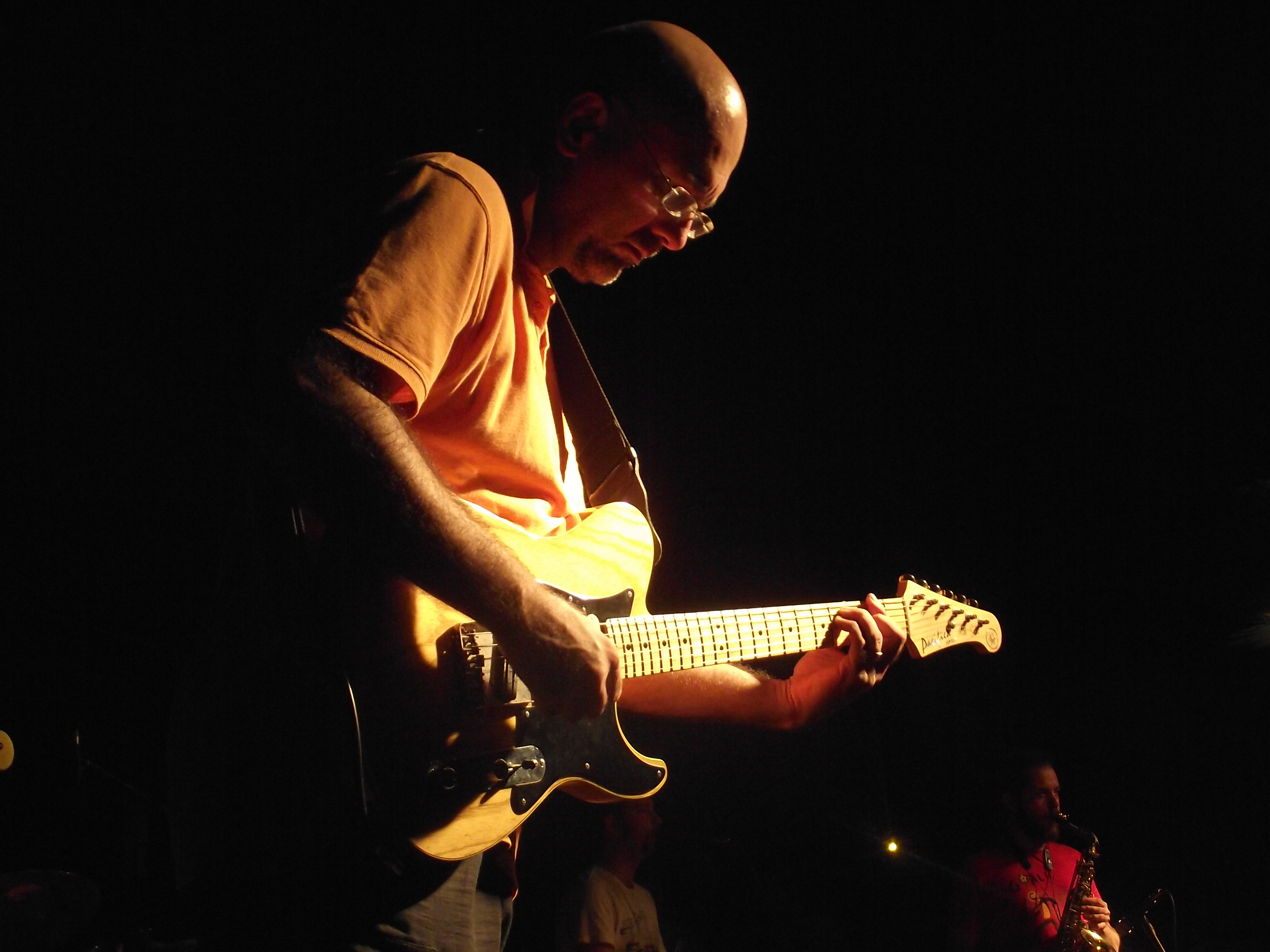
Akın Eldes

=== Akın Eldes ===
Guitarist

He was born in Frankfurt, Germany. Like the other group members, his first involvement in music started when he began playing mandolin and flute. His parents were worried that he may be attracted to ideas of revolting against authority. As a result, it was not until he was 16–17 years old and in high school old that he started playing the guitar. After performing with groups "e-5, Painted Bird, Asım Can Gündüz and Çapkınlar between the years of 1986–2000, he joined the group Bulutsuzluk Özlemi. Among other things, he played live with some of the other groups on stage at concerts and during recording. He recorded three different albums that show his own respect for music and his vivid visual sense that inform us about most of his work. Nowadays, he has been working with Pinhani as a musical producer and guitarist and he has taken part in all live performances with the group for a long time.

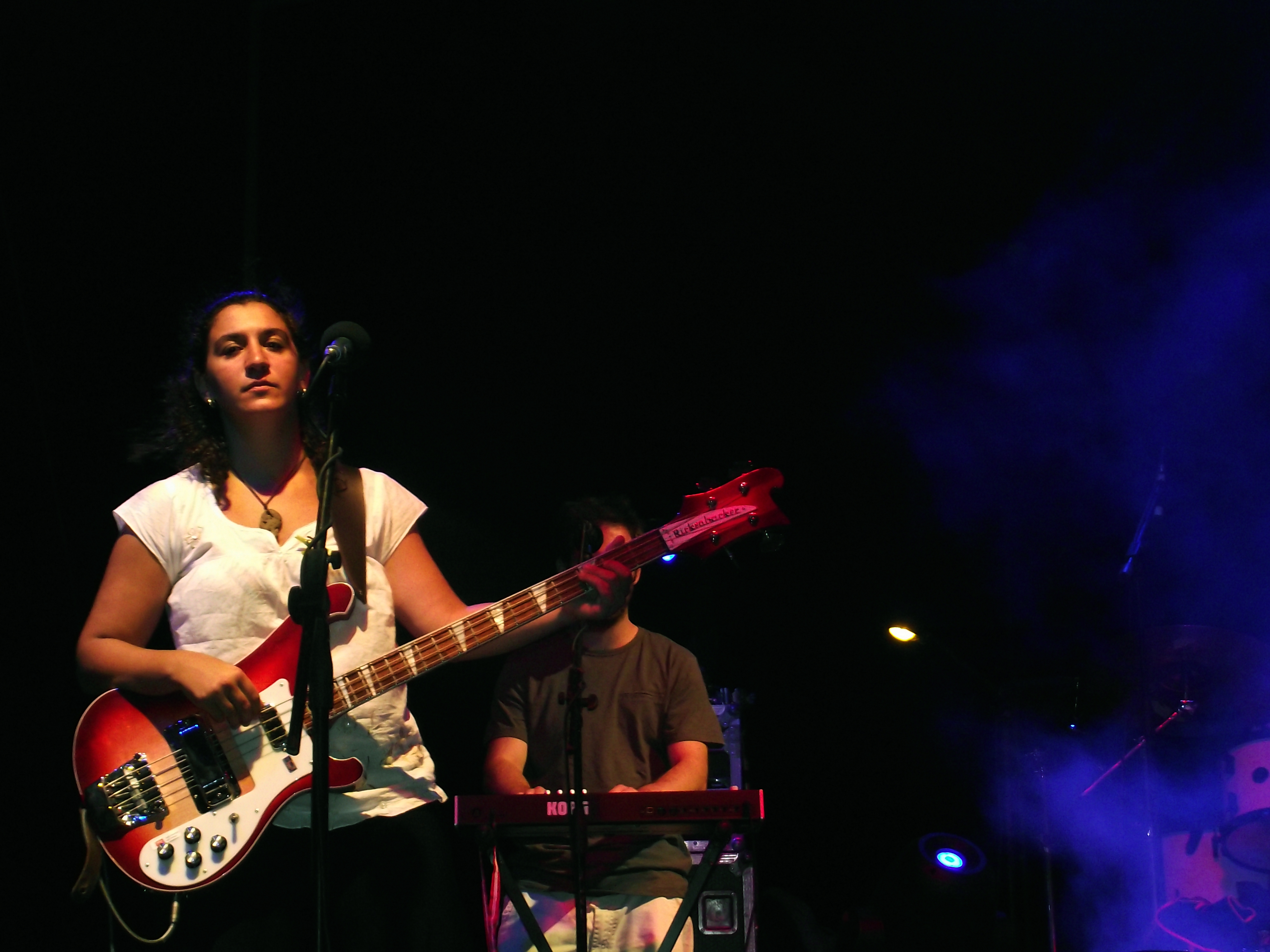
Zeynep Eylül Üçer

=== Zeynep Eylül Üçer ===
Bass guitarist, keyboard

She was born on September 16, 1985, in Istanbul, Turkey. She spent her childhood in Teşvikiye. Between 1991 and 1997, she was a member of the TRT children's chorus. After attending primary school for a year, she moved to Antalya with her family. She played basketball in the second league for a long time. What activated her interest in music was when she received a guitar given by her cousin, Sinan Kaynakçı, as a present. Her mother is a music teacher and she gave Zeynep solfej and Armani lessons. She used to come to Istanbul from time to time to visit while she was living in Antalya, but in 2005, she moved back to Istanbul permanently. She is currently studying at Istanbul Technical University Conservatoire.

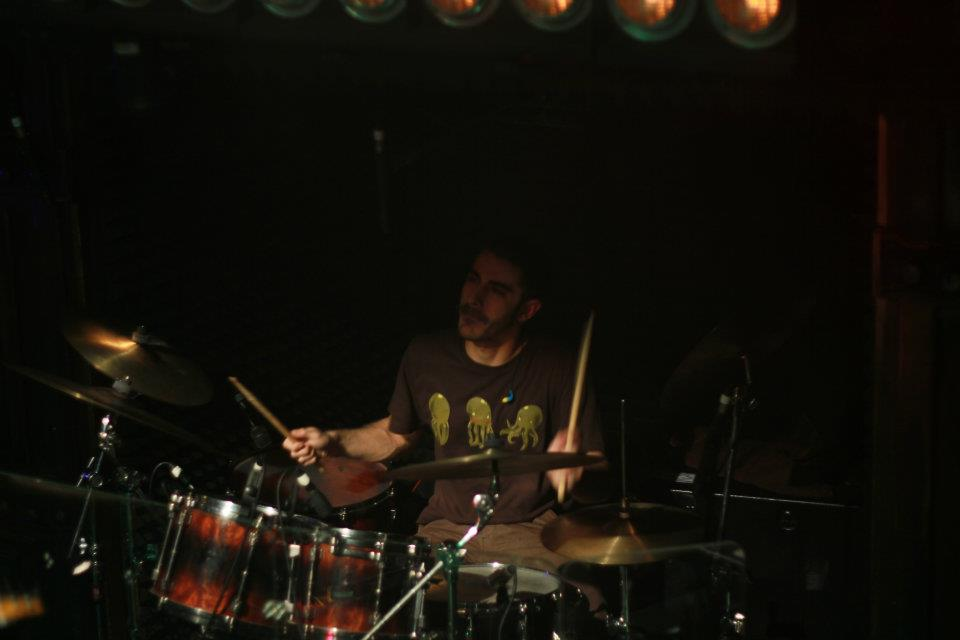
Hami Ünlü

=== Hami Ünlü ===
Drums

He was born on May 12, 1985. After his high school education in Notre Dame de Sion, he went to Galatasaray University to study economy where he is studying to this day. His music life got started when he joined a drum club in 2000. He received music lessons which gave him the opportunity to meet some well known teachers like Hakan Açıkalın, Bülent Akbay, Alişan Topaloşlu and Berke Özgümüş. He was interested in jazz and drums when he was in high school. He attended some workshops with his teacher Phillipe Poussard who is a teacher at the University of Paris Conservatoire. He became a member of Pinhani in 2006. He also performs in Akın Eldes's trio from time to time.

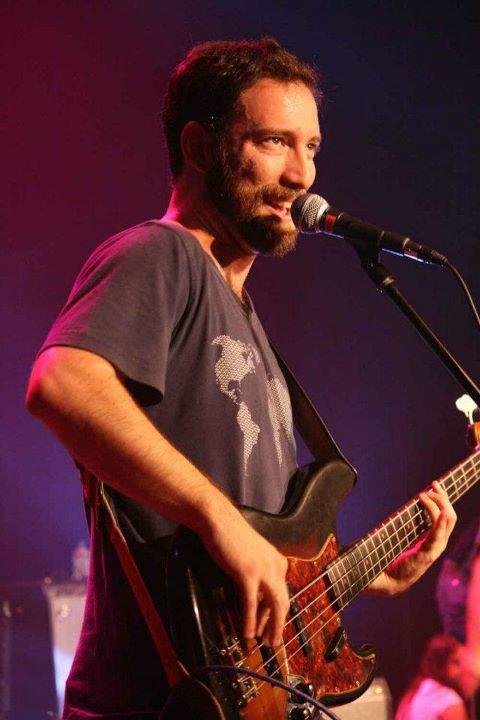
Selim Aydın

=== Selim Aydın ===
Guitars, keyboard

He was born on May 16, 1981. He spent his childhood in Adana. The first step he made towards his professional music life was when he began taking classical guitar lessons in primary school. While he was in high school, he performed in concerts and competitions with his group. He met Sinan Kaynakçı when he was at university and he became a member of Van Basten with him. He studied armoni with Cem Nasuhoğlu. Initially, he was unable to play with Pinhani during the recording of their first album as he was abroad. Then he was performing his military service when the group went on an Anatolian tour. But now, since their debut, he has been working with Pinhani.

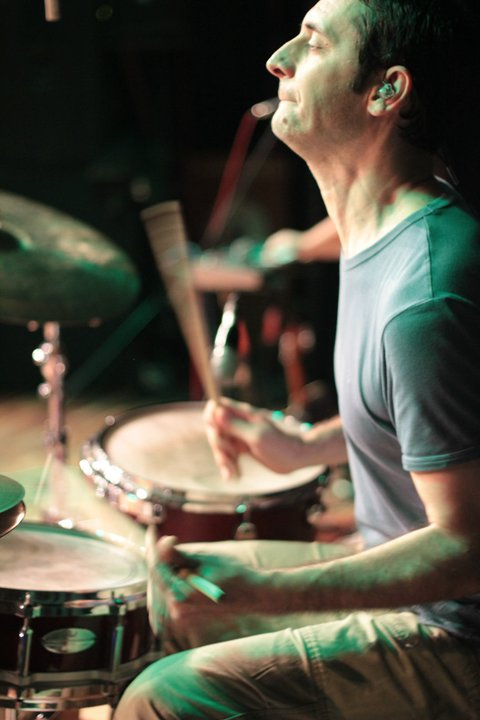
Cem Aksel

=== Cem Aksel ===
Drums

He was born on February 17, 1963, in Ankara. His interest in jazz and drums had become noticeable when he was in primary school in Istanbul. When he finished high school, he became a professional musician. In 1983, he attended the Swiss Jazz School which was in Swiss Bern, he was unable to continue his studies there due to circumstantial reasons. From that day on, the artist who has been making his living with music played on more than 60 albums with several different singers and artists. He has worked with almost all of the jazz artists in Turkey. Currently, Cem Aksel has been giving performances with Bülent Ortaçgil and many other jazz artists in different places. Cem Aksel performed on both of Pinhani's first and second albums as a drummer. He still plays live with Pinhani at their concert performances from time to time.

=== Eray Polat ===
Guitars

He was born on 19 January 1991 in Istanbul, Turkey. His family moved to Fethiye, Turkey, and he lived there until the age of 18. In primary school, he started his musical life by taking baglama lessons; started playing the guitar when he was 17. He has been playing with Pinhani since 2014.

== Albums ==
=== İnandığın Masallar (2006) ===
- İstanbul'da
- Unutuldular
- Haftanin Sonu
- Ben Nası Büyük Adam Olucam
- Beni Al
- Dön Bak Dünyaya
- Seni Bana Anlatırlar
- Hele Bi Gel
- Gözler Anlatır
- Yıldızlar

=== Zaman Beklemez (2008) ===
- Zaman Beklemez
- Düğün
- Ağlama
- Ne Güzel Güldün
- Dursana Dünya
- Sırası Değil
- Yansın
- Bir Anda
- Yanlızlık
- Düğün Dernek
- Sevmekten Usanmam

=== Başka Şeyler (2012) ===
- Bana Hediye
- Yitirmeden
- Beni Unutur Musun?
- Kaçsam Gitsem
- Çok Aşık
- Değirmendeki
- Hiç Kimseyim
- Kendime Zararım
- Düşen Yaprağın İçinde
- Eylül
- Kapı Parası
- Günaydın Sevgilim

=== Canlı Yayın (Live) (2013) ===
- Bir Varmışım Bir Yokmuşum
- Gönül Dağı
- Şairin Elinde
- Beni Al
- Bir Damla Gözlerimde
- Sevduğum Yanımda Uyusun
- Hele Bi Gel
- Ya Sen Olmasaydın
- Uçtu Uçtu
- Ağlama
- Bir Elmanın Yarısı

=== Kediköy (2016) ===
- Nehirler Durmaz
- Sen Olmayınca
- Geri Dönemem
- Köprü Ortasında
- Beni Sen İnandır
- Dur Söyleme
- Zor Günler
- Düşmanmışız Gibi
- Koluma Yazdım İsmini
- Oyalan
- Benim Yüzümden
- Kurtar
- Dur Söyleme (Tekli Versiyon)

=== Yollar Bizi Bekler (2019) ===
- Bana El Salla
- Gör Beni
- Kendinden Usandırma
- Kefen Giydim
- Sana Bir Şey Olursa
- Sevmek Güzeldir
- İyi Değilim Ben
- Neden Ben Anlamam
- Peki Madem
- Derdim Dostum Benim
- Senden Hatıra Kaldı
- Kendinden Usandırma – Kemençe Versiyon

=== Singles ===
- Yitirmeden (2011)
- Değirmendeki (2011)
- Eylül (2011)
- Dur Söyleme (2014)
- Düşmanmışız Gibi (2015)
- Kendinden Usandırma (2018)
- Peki Madem (with Melis Danişmend, 2018)
- Çekirdekten (with Cihan Mürtezaoğlu, 2019)
- Üzülmeyelim (2019)
- Hikayeler Tükendi (2020)
- Ankara Gel Dedi (2020)
- Dünyadan Uzak (2020)
- Çok Alıştım Sana (2020)
- Beni Böyle Sevemezsin (2020)
- Aşk Bir Mevsim (2020)
- Ben de Delirdim (2020)

== Music videos ==
- İstanbul'da
- Hele Bi Gel
- Ben Nası Büyük Adam Olucam
- Ağlama
- Dursana Dünya
- Ne Güzel Güldün
- Düğün Dernek
- Zaman Beklemez
- Sevmekten Usanmam
- Yitirmeden
- Bana Hediye
- Gönül Dağı
- Bir Varmışım Bir Yokmuşum
- Uçtu Uçtu
- Dur Söyleme
- Düşmanmışız Gibi
- Unutuldular
- Geri Dönemem
- Beni Sen İnandır
- Ben de Delirdim
- Dön Bak Dünyaya
- Bilir O Beni

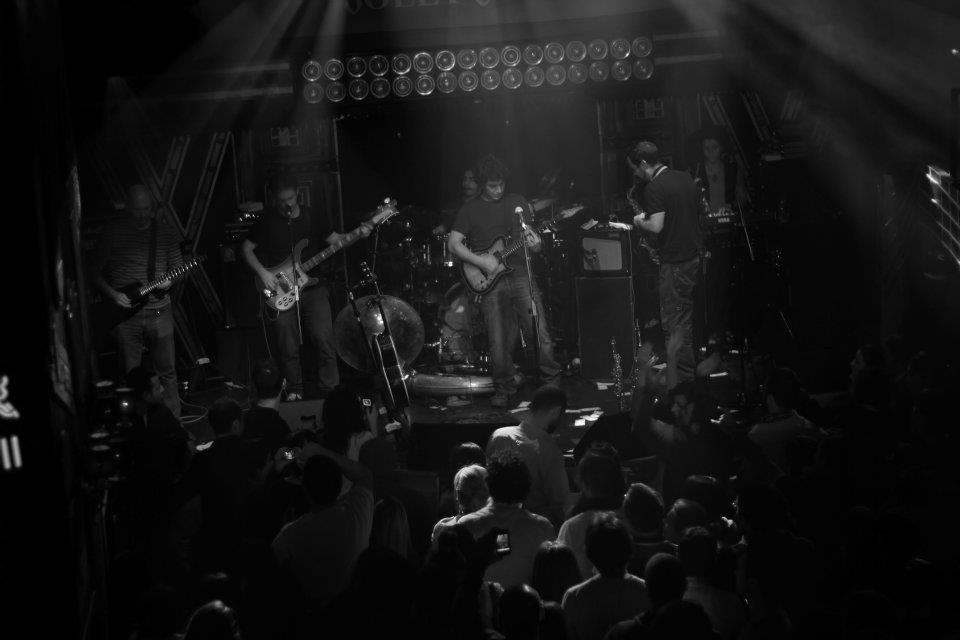
Pinhani at Jolly Joker Balans
