= Axios =

Axios commonly refers to:

- Axios (river), a river that runs through Greece and North Macedonia
- Axios (website), an American news and information website

Axios may also refer to:

== Brands and enterprises ==
- Axios, a brand of suspension products owned by Tenneco
- Axios Systems, an IT management software vendor

== Geography ==
- Axios, Thessaloniki, a Greek municipality named after the river in geographical Macedonia
- Orontes River, a river in Syria, also called Axios or Axius in antiquity

== Religion ==
- Axios (acclamation), an expression used in the Orthodox church
- Axios (organization), an Orthodox and Eastern Catholic LGBT organization

== See also ==
- Axis (disambiguation)
- Axius (disambiguation)
- Gnaeus Domitius Corbulo
- Vardar (disambiguation)
