= Bulutsuzluk Özlemi =

Turkish rock band

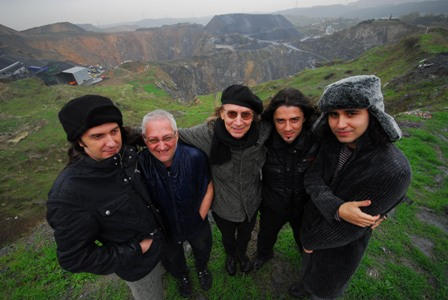
Bulutsuzluk Özlemi in 2007

Bulutsuzluk Ozlemi is a Turkish rock band that was founded in 1984. It is the first Turkish alternative rock band to combine Western rock melodies and Anatolian rhythms with Turkish lyrics. Bulutsuzluk Özlemi often creates songs that have sociological, political, economic and psychological messages.

== History ==
In college, Nejat Yavaşoğulları played in several bands. He founded his own band in 1984. He named the band Bulutsuzluk Ozlemi, the name of an article by Mumtaz Soysal.

The group is known for its political content. In many of its songs written by Nejat Yavaşoğulları, there is a call for an uprising. Thus, Bulutsuzluk Ozlemi is known for its protest music.

== Political content ==
During the Iraq War, band members attached stickers that stated "No to War" to their instruments. Their music videos were banned and many of their concerts were canceled. They are actively involved in social and political projects. They released a song titled "Herseyin Farkindayim" that was influenced by the Gezi Park protests.

== Related projects ==
Bulutsuzluk Ozlemi and Cem Adrian played in Belgium and France for a project called "Romance and Rock". Nejat Yavaşoğulları presents a TV program in TRT Türk which covers the stories of great musicians such as John Lennon and Rolling Stones.

== Band members ==
=== Members ===
The members are Nejat Yavaşoğulları, Gencay Kıymaz, Sunay Özgür, Sina Koloğlu and Deniz Demiröz.

=== Former members ===
Former members include Ozan Kanöz, Akın Eldes, Filip Sümbülkaya, Richard Hames, Demirhan Baylan, Murat Tükenmez, Cihangir Bıyıkoğlu, Utku Ünal, Burak Güven, Süleyman Bağcıoğlu and Serdar Öztop.

== Discography ==
=== Albums ===
Studio albums
Year	Album
1986	Bulutsuzluk Özlemi
1990	Uçtu Uçtu
1992	Güneşimden Kaç
1998	Yol
2001	Numara
2005	Felluce/Bağdat
2009	Zamska

=== Concert records ===
Live albums
Year	Album	Additions
1996	Yaşamaya Mecbursun	
2004	Bulutsuzluk Senfoni	
2007	Bulutsuzluk 20 Yaşında	
2007	Bulutsuzluk 20 Yaşında	Released as a DVD.
2008	Bulutsuzluk Senfoni	Released as a DVD.

=== Compilation records ===
Compilation albums
Year	Album
2006	Bulutsuzluk Özlemi Üçlü Albüm Seti

=== Singles ===
- "Felluce Bağdat" (2005)
- "Her Şeyin Farkındayım (Gezi Parkındayım)" (2013)
- "Hayat Geçerken / Mücella" (2019)
- "Yeni Bir Gün" (2019)
- "Kimse Barıştan Söz Etmiyor" (2025)
