= Axius =

Axius may refer to:

== Geography ==
- Orontes River, also known as Axios or Axius, river in Lebanon, Syria, and Turkey
- Vardar, also known as Axios or Axius, a river in Macedonia and Greece

== People ==
- Members of the Axia gens, a plebeian family of ancient Rome

== Other uses ==
- Axius (crustacean), a genus of decapods, also known as mud lobsters
- Axius (mythology), the god of the river Axius

== See also ==
- Axis (disambiguation)
- Axios (disambiguation)
