= Minrecordite =

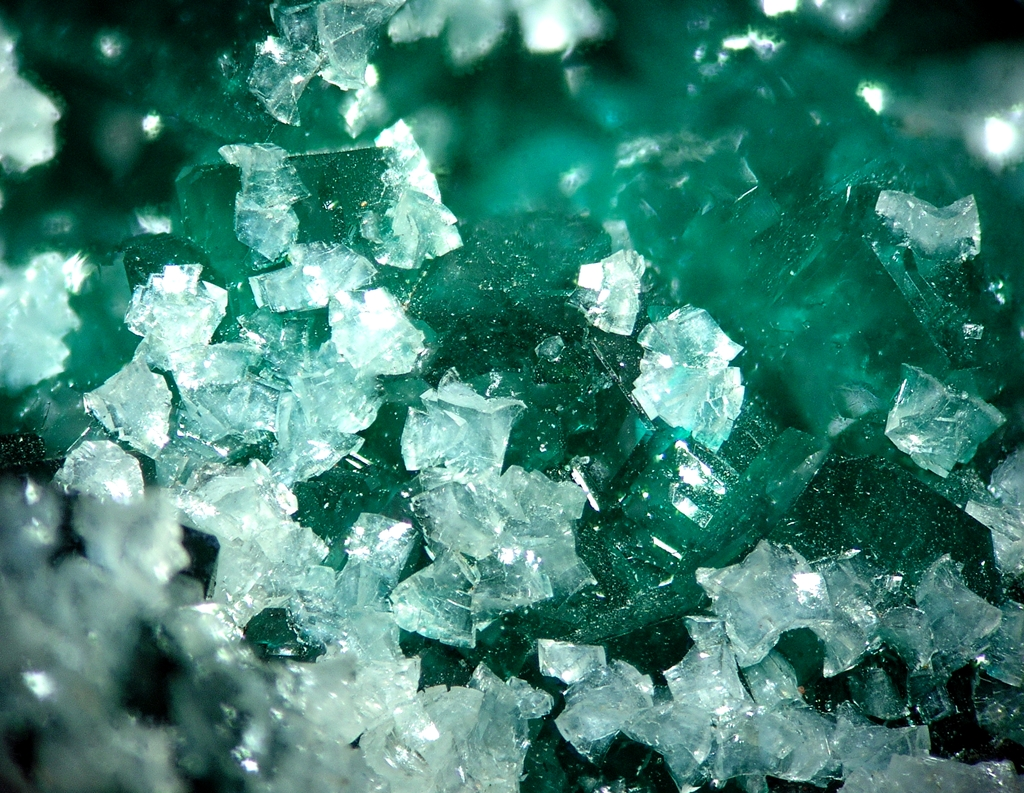

General
- Category: Carbonate minerals Dolomite group
- Formula: CaZn(CO_{3})_{2}
- IMA symbol: Mrd
- Strunz classification: 5.AB.10
- Crystal system: Trigonal
- Crystal class: 3̅ Rhomboehedral

Identification
- Color: White, colourless
- Crystal habit: Typically rhombohedral crystals saddle-shaped, twisted
- Cleavage: Very good on [10-14]
- Mohs scale hardness: 3.5–4
- Luster: Pearly
- Streak: White
- Diaphaneity: Translucent
- Specific gravity: 3.45

Minrecordite, CaZn(CO_{3})_{2}, is a very rare mineral belonging to the dolomite group, the member with Ca and Zn. It was discovered, associated with dioptase, in a specimen from the Tsumeb mine (Namibia), which is consequently its type locality. Its name is a tribute to The Mineralogical Record magazine, representing the collaboration between professional and amateur mineralogists. In this locality it is associated primarily with dioptase, and less frequently with duftite, calcite and malachite. It is a rare mineral, which has been found only in a few deposits in the world. In addition to the type locality, it appears in the Preguiça mine, in Moura, district of Beja (Portugal).
