= Axial =

Axial may refer to:

- one of the anatomical directions describing relationships in an animal body
- In geometry:

- a geometric term of location
- an axis of rotation

- In chemistry, referring to an axial bond
- a type of modal frame, in music
- axial-flow, a type of fan
- the Axial Age in China, India, etc.
- Axial Seamount and submarine volcano off Oregon, USA
- Axial, Colorado, a ghost town

== See also ==
- Axiality (disambiguation)
- Axis (disambiguation)
