= Axios Systems =

IT Management Software Vendor

- Industry: Enterprise software IT services and management IT consulting
- Founded: 1988; 38 years ago
- Founder: Tasos Symeonides; Ailsa Symeonides
- Defunct: 22 March 2021; 5 years ago
- Fate: Acquired by IFS AB
- Headquarters: Edinburgh, United Kingdom
- Area served: Global
- Key people: Alan Laing (MD); Martin Schirmer (COO)
- Products: assyst assystITAM Suite
- Services: Service desk IT service management IT asset management
- Number of employees: 250 (2014)
- Website: assyst.ifs.com

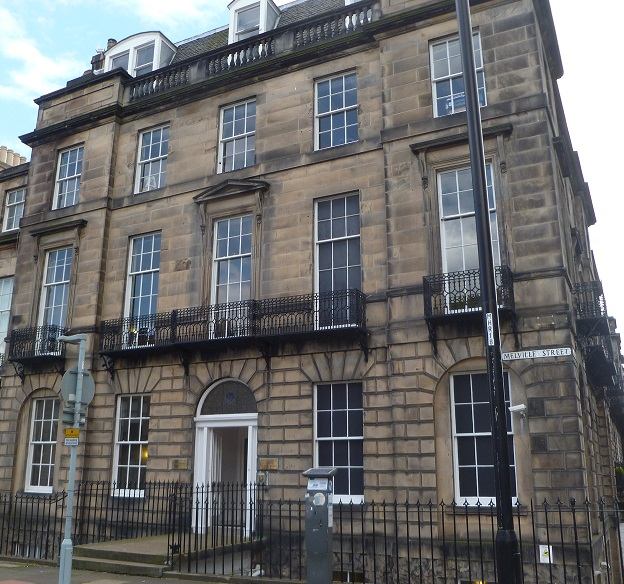
Axios Systems' former global headquarters in Edinburgh, United Kingdom

Axios Systems was a provider of Service Desk, IT Service Management and IT asset management software. Its assyst enterprise application suite was the first to support ITIL best practices. In March 2021, the company was acquired by IFS AB and its product was rebranded as IFS assyst.

The company had several large customers including Lego and Linklaters.

The company was headquartered in Edinburgh, United Kingdom, with North American headquarters in Herndon, Virginia.

== History ==
Tasos Symeonides and Ailsa Symeonides founded the company in 1988. Symeonides, who was born in Cyprus and migrated to Glasgow as a child, reportedly got the idea of launching Axios Systems while walking in a park and contemplating how to pay the mortgage on his newly purchased home in the Eskbank area of Edinburgh. Initially, 16 employees worked from the Symeonides residence. John Menzies, which had previously employed Tasos as a computer systems manager, became Axios Systems' first customer. The business continued to operate from within the family's attic and bedrooms until 1995, when the company moved to Walker Street, near Haymarket, Edinburgh, and later to nearby Melville Street.

From 2003, Axios Systems expanded into Europe, opening offices in Amsterdam, Munich, Moscow, the United Arab Emirates and Malaysia.

In 2004, Targeting Innovation, in partnership with Scottish Enterprise, named Axios Systems the 'Scottish software company of the year'.

In March 2004, Axios was the first organization to achieve BS15000 (now ISO 20000) certification.

In 2013, Axios became the first service management vendor to introduce gamification.

In 2016, assyst then achieved accreditation for 16 PinkVERIFY ITIL processes, the first service management vendor to do so.

In March 2021, the company was acquired by IFS AB and its product was rebranded as IFS assyst.

== Certifications, governance and compliancy ==
- ISO/IEC 20000 (formerly BS 15000)
- ISM certification
- ITIL (all 16 processes)
- Microsoft Software Asset Management Competency

== See also ==
- Help Desk
- ITIL
