= AXIS Flight Training Systems =

AXIS Flight Training Systems GmbH
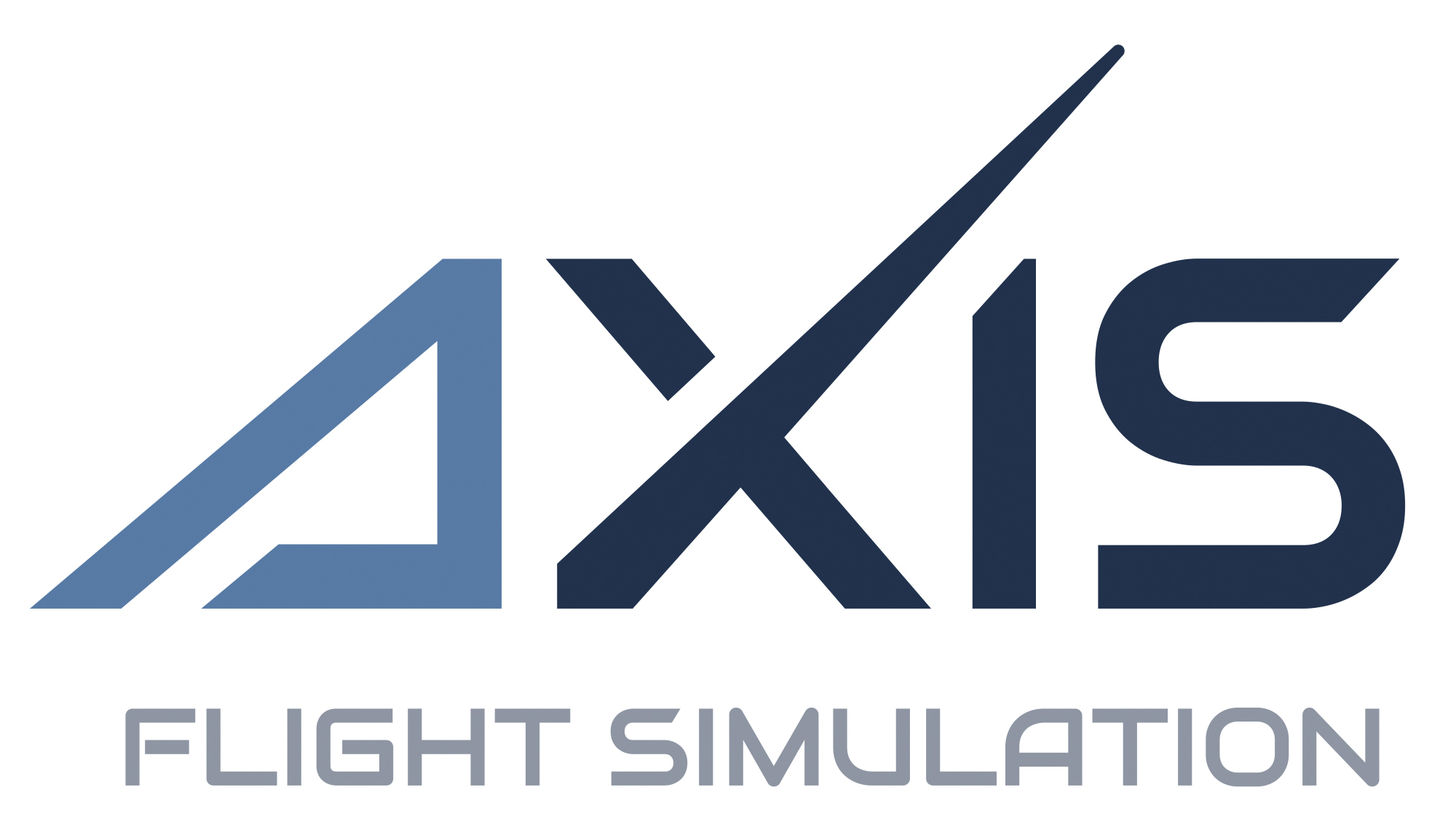
- Type: Private
- Industry: Flight Simulation
- Founded: Graz, Austria (2004)
- Headquarters: Lebring
- Products: Flight Training Devices, FNPTs, FTDs, Full Flight Simulators

AXIS Flight Training Systems GmbH, based in Lebring, Styria, is a provider of Full Flight Simulators (FFS) for civil aviation and Europe's largest provider of flight simulators.

The company was founded in 2004 by engineers and pilots and is a medium-sized company with 100 employees. . AXIS has developed its first full-flight simulator for the Fokker 100 with the support of the Austrian Research Promotion Agency (FFG) in cooperation with the Styrian Economic Development Agency (SFG). In July 2008, this simulator received the FFS Level D certificate from the Austrian authority AUSTRO CONTROL in accordance with the requirements of JAR-FSTD (A). In addition to the Lebring site, AXIS also has offices in Pécs, Hungary and Montreal, Canada.

== Offer ==
AXIS manufactures full-flight simulators (FFS) and flight training equipment (FTD) for all aircraft types and configurations, from business jets to turboprop regional aircraft such as the ATR 42/72 and passenger aircraft such as Airbus or Boeing.

=== Products ===
- Full Flight Simulators (FFS), qualified up to Level D, for all types of aircraft, including:
  - Regional turboprops
  - Business jets
  - Passenger jets
- Low-level Devices (LLD): Qualified as Flight Training Equipment (FTD) Level 1 or 2 or Type-Specific Flat Panel Trainer (FPT). Devices range from touchscreen-based simulators to fully replicated hardware.
- Virtual Procedure Trainers (VPT): Touchscreen-based simulators
- Computer-based trainers (CBT): Low-level training equipment (e.g. for avionics training)

== Services ==
- Training in the operation of the simulators
- Maintenance of simulators including spare parts management
- Online monitoring of simulators

== Company History ==
AXIS Flight Training Systems was founded in 2004. In 2008, the first complete flight simulator (Fokker 100) was successfully delivered to a customer. This has been qualified by Austro Control and EASA in accordance with the JAR-FSTD regulations. Two years later, in 2010, the company began developing a new-generation full-flight simulator.

In 2012, a new ATR simulator received EASA qualification. At the same time, the AVC-AXIS virtual cockpit with touchscreen technology was introduced. From 2013 to 2014, the first qualification of the Cessna Citation XLS, a new type of business jet, took place. During this time, AXIS also acquired its first international customers, including the University di Enna Kore in Italy and SimCom International in Orlando, Florida.

In 2015, AXIS received FAA approval for a simulator in the USA for the first time. In addition, the company delivered the first ATR42/72 full-flight simulator to a training center in Austria and commissioned the Technical Monitoring and Control System (TMCS). In 2016, AXIS successfully entered the Asian market and gained two new customers. In addition, the ATR-72-500 simulator received DGCA qualification from the Indian authority.

In 2017, AXIS Simulation Holding GmbH (ASH) acquired all of the company's shares. This year, Aviation Academy Austria used the new AXIS FFS to train ATR600 operators. AXIS also built an FFS for customers in Southeast Asia. In 2018, AXIS launched a new generation of simulators that brought improvements in the areas of usability, reliability, maintainability and automation. The development of its own rehosted solution was also initiated this year. In addition, the ATR 72-600 simulator received EASA qualification with stimulated original hardware. The company opened an office in Canada.

In 2019, a Citation Jet CJ1+ FFS Level D was successfully delivered and qualified. In 2020, AXIS received its first contract as a subsystem supplier for a major European aerospace and defence company. In addition, the ATR72-500 was successfully qualified to EASA standards in Asia, and the installation of its own rehosted solution for an ATR72-600 avionics system in Ireland was successful.

In 2022, AXIS opened a development office in Hungary. In addition, the product range was expanded to include subordinate devices. In 2023, aircraft performance data collection and modelling was introduced internally, and development of the CL 650 FFS, as well as the CL 350 FFS, which can be upgraded to the CL 3500, began.

In 2025, AXIS expanded its presence in the United States with new simulator installations and operational activities. As part of this expansion, the company certified the first U.S.-based Level D Challenger 350 flight simulator for Vista America.

AXIS has expanded its development activities in the field of virtual reality for pilot training. In 2026, AXIS introduced AI-powered technologies to improve the efficiency of pilot training.

== Business Awards ==
- Fast Forward Award 2012: AXIS Flight Training Systems GmbH has been awarded the Fast Forward Award for the most innovative product of the year 2012 by the Styrian Chamber of Commerce.
- Export Award 2018: On June 7, 2018, AXIS received the Export Award 2018 at the 14th Styrian Export Day of the Styrian Chamber of Commerce.
