= IFS AB =

British enterprise software company

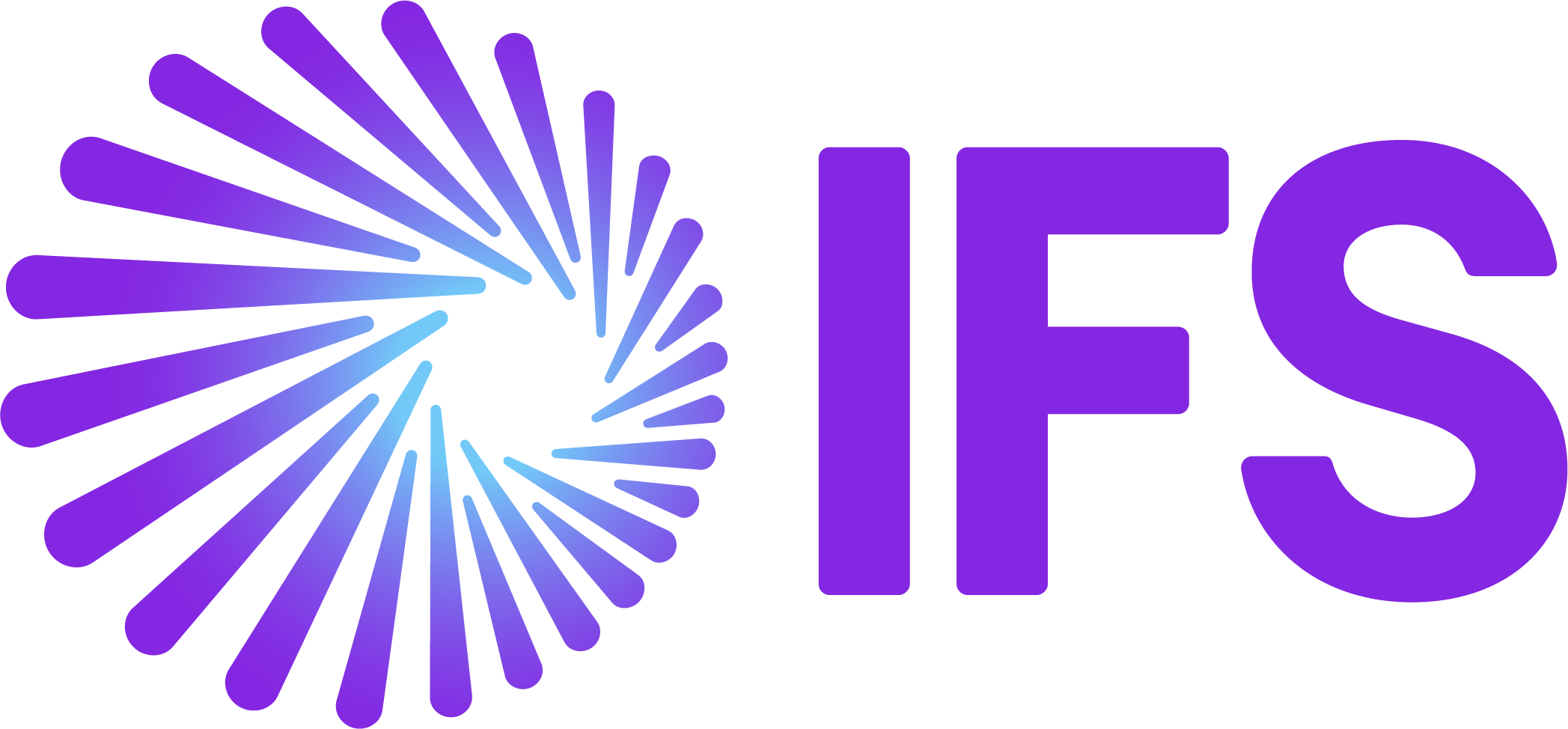
- Trade name: IFS
- Type: Private
- Industry: Enterprise software
- Founded: 1983
- Headquarters: London, United Kingdom
- Area served: Worldwide
- Key people: Mark Moffat (CEO); Darren Roos (Chairman)
- Products: enterprise resource planning (ERP); enterprise asset management (EAM); field service management (FSM); enterprise service management
- Revenue: €1.7 billion (2025)
- Owners: EQT; Hg; TA Associates (minority), with additional minority investors reported in 2025
- Number of employees: 7,000+ (2024)
- Website: www.ifs.com

IFS (originally Industrial and Financial Systems) is a global enterprise software and industrial AI software company headquartered in London, United Kingdom. The company develops cloud-based enterprise software focused on asset- and service-intensive industries, including enterprise resource planning (ERP), enterprise asset management (EAM), and field service management (FSM).

== History ==
IFS was founded in 1983 as Industrial & Financial Systems in Linköping Sweden, by a group of students from Linköping University. The company launched its first software product in 1985, a maintenance system for UNIX computers deployed at Swedish nuclear power facilities. In 1991, the company started expanding internationally with an office in Norway. In 1995, the company introduced the IFS Applications product suite, known for being able to operate on different types of hardware. The company continued its international expansion. The company expanded to North America in 1995.

In 1996, IFS was listed in the Swedish stock exchange and the product was made into a component based one. This was followed with the launch of its web client and its establishment of a research and development center in Colombo. In 2001, IFS introduced Java-based mobile clients and Internet portals. In 2004, NEC acquired a 7.7% share of IFS. By 2005, IFS Applications had more than 500,000 users. In 2008, IFS launched its new GUI and began several acquisitions.

In 2015, IFS was acquired by EQT, a Swedish private equity group. Also in 2018, Darren Roos was appointed as CEO.

In July 2020, the EQT VII fund sold IFS AB to the successor funds EQT VIII and EQT IX, and global growth private equity firm, TA Associates, which became a minority partner at a transaction value in excess of US$3 billion.

In March 2022, EQT announced it was selling the majority of its stake in IFS and WorkWave to software and services investor Hg, in a transaction valued at $10 billion.

In January 2024, IFS appointed Mark Moffat as its new CEO, and Darren Roos became Chairman of the Board. In April 2024, EQT sold a $3 billion stake in IFS to Abu Dhabi Investment Authority and Canada Pension Plan. In July 2024, IFS acquired EmpowerMX, a developer of aircraft business management software. In August 2024, the company acquired Vancouver-based decision-analytics firm Copperleaf.

In April 2025, EQT and TA Associates sold approximately €3 billion in shares of IFS in a transaction that valued the company at over €15 billion (approximately US$16 billion). As part of the transaction, Hg increased its stake to become a co-control shareholder alongside EQT, while a wholly-owned subsidiary of the Abu Dhabi Investment Authority (ADIA) and the Canada Pension Plan Investment Board (CPP Investments) joined as new minority investors. TA Associates remained as a minority shareholder. In April 2025, IFS launched Nexus Black, an initiative to accelerate the adoption of Industrial AI with customers, in the areas of predictive maintenance, intelligent scheduling, and autonomous decision-making. In June 2025, the company acquired Silicon Valley startup TheLoops, a developer of software for building and deploying AI Agents across business teams. In August 2025, IFS acquired UK-based AI automation and logistics management company 7bridges. In December 2025, it was announced that IFS had entered into a definitive agreement to acquire Softeon, a developer of cloud-native warehouse management, execution and distributed order management software. The acquisition was intended to expand IFS’s industrial software portfolio into warehouse operations and is subject to regulatory approval, with completion expected in the first quarter of 2026. In March 2026, the company announced the acquisition was completed, with the business operating as IFS Softeon.

In January 2026, Cadillac F1 announced IFS as its 2026 technology partner. In February 2026, British football club Chelsea FC announced that IFS would be one of the club's front of shirt sponsors, in a deal running until 2028.

== Products and services ==
IFS develops and markets enterprise software for organizations that manage physical assets; manufacture and distribute goods; or operate field service businesses. The company's principal platform, IFS Cloud, combines enterprise resource planning, enterprise asset management, field service management, and enterprise service management capabilities. The company also develops an artificial intelligence platform called IFS.ai, to improve real-time data interaction and decision-making.
The company's industrial software is designed for businesses in manufacturing; utilities; construction & engineering; telecommunications; aerospace & defence; and the services industry.

== Operations ==
IFS is headquartered in London, United Kingdom. The company lists 42 offices in 26 countries. Mark Moffat is the company's CEO, and Darren Roos is Chairman of the Board. As of January 2026, the company reported 7,000 employees in 80 countries. The company reported €1.7 billion revenue in 2025. The company's clients include Rolls-Royce, HomeServe, E.On and Boston Dynamics.

== See also ==
- Enterprise resource planning
- Enterprise asset management
- Field service management
