= Utku Ünal =

Turkish musician

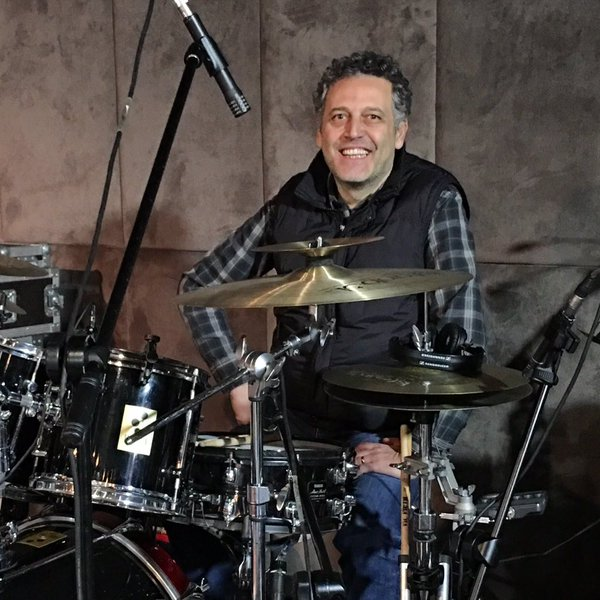

Background information
- Origin: Turkey
- Genres: Jazz, rock, Anatolian rock, pop
- Occupations: Teacher, musician
- Instruments: Drum, percussion
- Years active: 1996–present

Utku Ünal is a Turkish musician.

Ünal graduated from the Middle East Technical University in 1995. Between 2006 and 2007, he completed his master's thesis on Analysis of usage of 5 and 10 timed Rhythms in the Southeastern Anatolian Region and has since continued his academic career as an instructor to various private education institutions including Robert College, ENKA, Ulus Private Jewish Schools and Hisar Schools.

Ünal is married to Gülin Terek Ünal and is the father of a daughter, Cemre.
