= Axis 2 =

Axis 2 may refer to:

- Apache Axis2, software for Web services
- Axis II (psychiatry), a class of psychiatric disorders
