= Cenan Akın =

Cenan Akın (1932, Şebinkarahisar – 3 November 2006, Istanbul) was a Turkish composer, conductor and music educator. He directed the first L.P. disc of modern Turkish choral music, in the mid-1960s.

== Works ==
- Op. 1 İlk Şarkılar 'First Songs' (voice and piano)
- Op. 2 Çocuk Bahçesi 'Children's Playground' (voice and piano)
- Op. 3 Altı Şarkı 'Six Songs' (piano)
- Op. 4 Küçüklerin Dünyası 'Minors World' (piano)
- Op. 5 Halk Türküleri 'Folk Songs' (for choir)
- Op. 6 Rubailer (bass and piano)
- Op. 7 Sokaktayım 'In the street' (bass and piano)
- Op. 8 On Çocuk Şarkısı 'On Children's Song'
- Op. 9 Sinan'm Sarkılan (songs)
- Op. 10 Yunus' tan Deyişler 'Sayings of Yunus' (solo-chorus and orchestra)
- Op. 11 Kirtim Kirt for male chorus)
- Op. 12 Uzun Hava ve Horon 'Long-Air and Online' (piano)
- Op. 13 Orkestra İçin Üç Türkü (Bölümler: Dumanlı Boğaz; Ağıt; Yiğitleme) 'Three Turks (3 Parts: Misty throat; Requiem; Yiğitleme)'
- Op. 14 Marşlar 'Anthems' (voice and piano)
- Op. 15 Dağlar-Karakoyun 'Karakoyun Mountains' (piano)
- Op. 16 Duyuş 'Feeling' (for piano)
- Destan (for orchestra)
- Can Yurdum (for mixed choir)
- On Bir Mani (for mixed choir)
- Yayîa'da (for flute solo)
