= The Mineralogical Record =

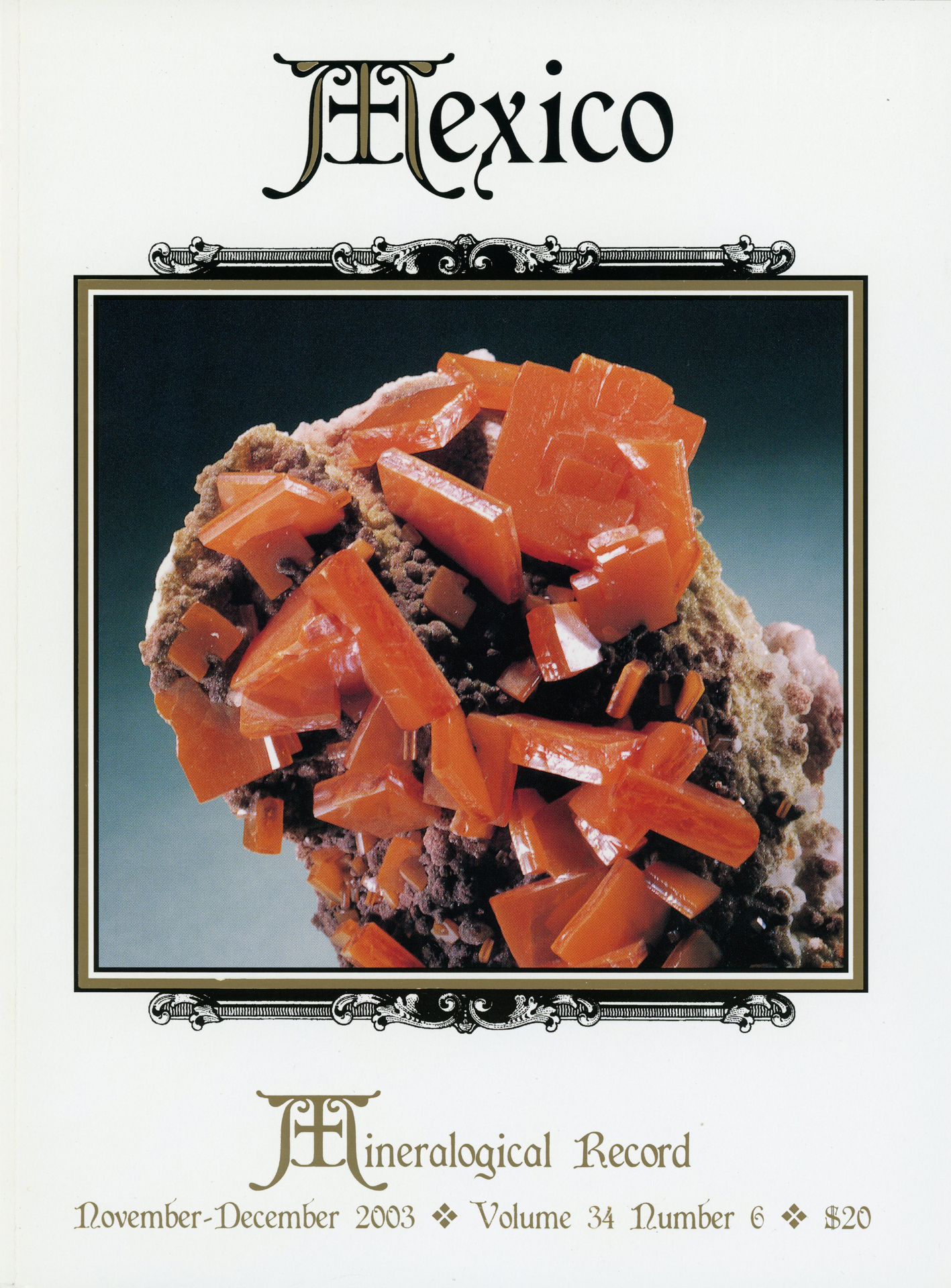
- Discipline: Mineralogy
- Language: English
- Edited by: Wendell E. Wilson

Publication details
- History: 1970–present
- Publisher: Mineralogical Record Inc. (United States)
- Frequency: 6/year

Standard abbreviations
- ISO 4: Mineral. Rec.

Indexing
- CODEN: MRECA7
- ISSN: 0026-4628
- LCCN: 79017554
- OCLC no.: 609855346

Links
- Journal homepage

The Mineralogical Record is a mineralogy magazine, published in the United States by The Mineralogical Record Inc., a non-profit organization, with a periodicity of six issues a year, totaling approximately 700 pages. Published in English, it carries articles on topographic mineralogy, including locations around the world, and articles on specimen-oriented mineralogy. It also publishes details of the main mineral fairs and, occasionally, articles on the history of mineralogy and on museums and mineral collections. In addition to the regular editions, it occasionally includes supplementary numbers, distributed at no additional cost to subscribers, on mineral collections from specific geographical areas. The publication of the magazine is maintained by the payment of subscriptions, advertising, publication and sale of books, and through donations.

== History ==
The Mineralogical Record was first published in 1970, on the initiative of John S. White, a curator in the Smithsonian Institution's Department of Mineralogy, with the aim of filling the gap between scientific mineralogy journals (which began at that time to look more like solid state physics and chemistry than conventional descriptive mineralogy) and purely amateur magazines. In the first year, only four numbers were published, without color photographs, with the financial support of Arthur Montgomery. In issue 2 of 1976, Wendell E. Wilson joined as and remains as such today.

The magazine is considered among the best in the world, both for the scientific quality of its contents and for the formal aspect, which includes the quality of the photographs and their reproduction. The work of The Mineralogical Record magazine in the promotion and dissemination of mineralogy has been recognized by giving a mineral the name of minrecordite. The role of its editor, Wendel E. Wilson, has been recognized by giving another mineral the name of wendwilsonite. In 1994, he won the Carnegie Prize for Mineralogy, the only time it has been awarded to a magazine.

== Axis ==
Axis: An Eclectic Journal of Mineralogy is a peer-reviewed online-only journal published by The Mineralogical Record since 2005. It covers a wide range of mineralogy-related topics such as the history of mineral collecting, social and cultural aspect of mineralogy and mineral-related travelogs.
