= Akın Öngör =

Akın Öngör (born 1945) is a Turkish former chief executive officer of Garanti Bank.

== Early life and education ==
He was born in 1945. He graduated from TED and then Middle East Technical University. In the college years, he played basketball as a guard. He studied business administration at METU and then started his career as a marketing expert. After working in different industries for 13 years, he joined Garanti as one of the vice presidents, responsible for marketing again.

In 1991, the owner of the bank (Ayhan Şahenk) offered the position of chief executive officer to Öngör. He ran the company for a decade.

Garanti experienced a tough and quite successful metamorphosis process in his period. When Öngör became chief executive officer, Garanti's total market value was around $150 million. After ten years of work, the value had increased to US$5 billion and Garanti was chosen as "The Best Bank on Earth" by Euromoney. The change was so successful that, it became a case study in both Harvard Business School and London Business School. And that case study is still being lectured to MBA students in these schools.

Öngör retired in 2001 to spend time with his wife and family.
