= Axiality and rhombicity =

Characteristics of a type of tensor

In physics and mathematics, axiality and rhombicity are two characteristics of a symmetric second-rank tensor in three-dimensional Euclidean space, describing its directional asymmetry.

Let A denote a second-rank tensor in R^{3}, which can be represented by a 3-by-3 matrix. We assume that A is symmetric. This implies that A has three real eigenvalues, which we denote by $A_{{xx}}$, $A_{{yy}}$ and $A_{{zz}}$. We assume that they are ordered such that

$$A_{{xx}} \le A_{{yy}} \le A_{{zz}}.$$

The axiality of A is defined by

$$\Delta A =2 A_{zz}-(A_{xx}+A_{yy}). \,$$

The rhombicity is the difference between the smallest and the second-smallest eigenvalue:

$$\delta A = A_{yy}-A_{xx}. \,$$

Other definitions of axiality and rhombicity differ from the ones given above by constant factors which depend on the context. For example, when using them as parameters in the irreducible spherical tensor expansion, it is most convenient to divide the above definition of axiality by ${\sqrt{6}}$ and that of rhombicity by ${2}$.

== Applications ==
The description of physical interactions in terms of axiality and rhombicity is frequently encountered in spin dynamics and, in particular, in spin relaxation theory, where many traceless bilinear interaction Hamiltonians, having the (eigenframe) form

$$\hat H = \hat\vec\mathbf{a}\cdot\mathbf{A}\cdot\hat\vec\mathbf{b} = A_{xx} \hat a_{x} \hat b_{x} + A_{yy} \hat a_{y} \hat b_{y} + A_{zz} \hat a_{z} \hat b_{z}$$

(hats denote spin projection operators) may be conveniently rotated using rank 2 irreducible spherical tensor operators:

$$\hat\vec\mathbf{a}\cdot\mathbf{A}\cdot\hat\vec\mathbf{b} = \frac{\delta A}{2} \hat T_{2,-2} + \frac{\delta A}{2} \hat T_{2,2} + \frac{\Delta A}{\sqrt{6}} \hat T_{2,-2}$$

$$\hat \hat R_{\alpha,\beta,\gamma} (\hat T_{l,m}) =  \sum_{k=-2}^2 \hat T_{l,k} \mathfrak{D}_{k,m}^{(l)}(\alpha,\beta,\gamma)$$

where $\mathfrak{D}_{k,m}^{(l)}(\alpha,\beta,\gamma)$ are Wigner functions, $(\alpha,\beta,\gamma)$ are Euler angles, and the expressions for the rank 2 irreducible spherical tensor operators are:

$$\hat T_{2,2} = + \frac{1}{2} \hat a_{+} \hat b_{+}$$
$$\hat T_{2,1} = - \frac{1}{2}( \hat a_{z} \hat b_{+} + \hat a_{+} \hat b_{z} )$$
$$\hat T_{2,0} = + \sqrt{\frac{2}{3}}( \hat a_{z} \hat b_{z} - \frac{1}{4}( \hat a_{+} \hat b_{-} + \hat a_{-} \hat b_{+}) )$$
$$\hat T_{2,-1} = + \frac{1}{2}( \hat a_{z} \hat b_{-} + \hat a_{-} \hat b_{z} )$$
$$\hat T_{2,-2} = + \frac{1}{2} \hat a_{-} \hat b_{-}$$

Defining Hamiltonian rotations in this way (axiality, rhombicity, three angles) significantly simplifies calculations, since the properties of Wigner functions are well understood.
