= Akın Vardar =

Turkish footballer

Akin Vardar
Personal information
- Date of birth: April 2, 1978 (age 48)
- Place of birth: Kuyucak, Aydın, Turkey
- Height: 1.83 m (6 ft 0 in)
- Position: Goalkeeper

Senior career*
| Years | Team | Apps | (Gls) |
| 1997–2003 | Aydınspor | 155 | (0) |
| 2003–2011 | Sivasspor | 76 | (0) |
| 2011 | Karşıyaka | 0 | (0) |
| 2011–2012 | Konya Şekerspor | 8 | (0) |
| 2012–2013 | Körfez FK | 0 | (0) |
- * Club domestic league appearances and goals

Akin Vardar (born 2 April 1978) is a Turkish retired footballer. He played as a goalkeeper.
