= Akın Eldes =

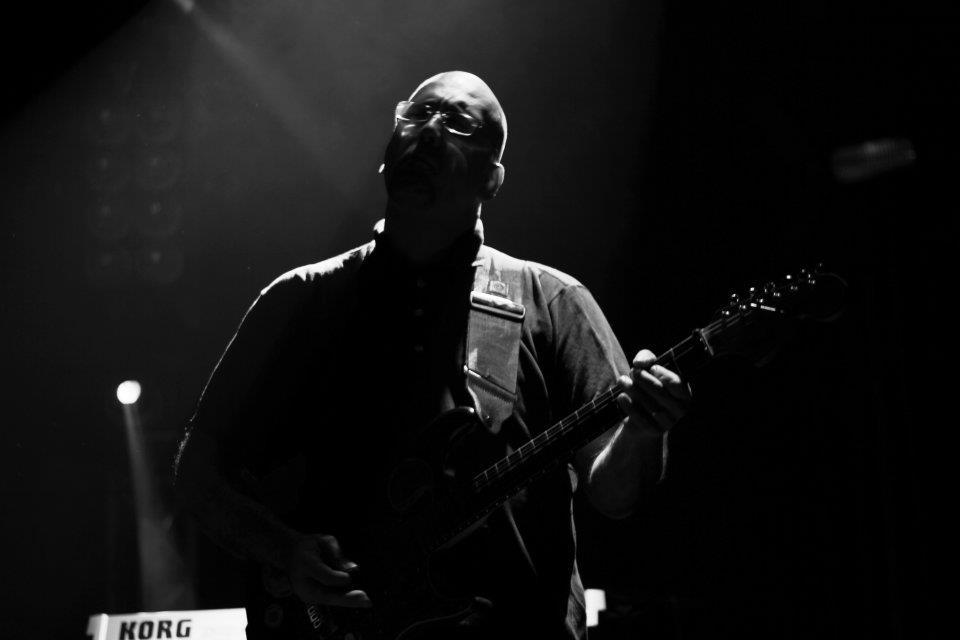

Background information
- Born: 11 November 1962 (age 62); Frankfurt, Germany
- Genres: Blues; blues rock; rock
- Occupation: Guitarist
- Website: www.akineldes.com

Akın Eldes (born 11 November 1962) is a Turkish guitarist.

== Career and life ==
Akın Eldes is a Turkish guitarist born in Frankfurt, Germany. He began his musical career playing the mandolin and flute as a child before taking up the guitar in high school. Throughout his career, Eldes has collaborated with various musicians and bands, including E-5, Painted Bird, and Bulutsuzluk Özlemi, where he played from 1986 to 2000. He has also worked with artists such as Bülent Ortaçgil and composer Melih Kibar.

Eldes is currently a member of the Turkish rock band Pinhani and is known for using hand-made guitars by Murat Sezen, as well as Yamaha Pacifica PAC1511MS and Steinberger Headless guitars during live performances.

== Albums ==
- Kafi (2002)
- Türlü (2004)
- Cango (2007)
- Ara Taksim (2009)
- Başka Türlü (2010)
- Hane-i Akustik (2011)
- Tek Başına (2018)
- Denemeler (2021)

== Singles ==
- Hep Birlikte (2019) KERRAR feat.Gönül Taner
- Hep Birlikte - Rerecording (2020)
- Kuzgun (2020)
- Deneme 1-2 (2020)
- Deneme 3-4 (2020)
- Deneme 5 (2020)
- Deneme 6 (2020)
- Deneme 7 - Kimlederdensin Kimlerlesin (2021)
- Deneme 8 - Oyun Havası (Karışık Tarz) (2021)
- Böyle (2021)
- Uzun İnce Bir Yoldayım (2021)
- Krähe - Kuzgun Pt.2 (2021)

== Other album appearances ==
- Bulutsuzluk Özlemi: Uçtu Uçtu, Güneşimden Kaç, Yaşamaya Mecbursun, Yol
- Bülent Ortaçgil: Bu Şarkılar Adam Olmaz.
- Gürol Ağırbaş: Bas Şarkıları II
- Barış Manço: Mançoloji
- Melih Kibar: Yadigar
- Mehmet Güreli
- Meltem Taşkıran
- Haluk Levent: Kral Çıplak
- Pinhani: İnandığın Masallar, Zaman Beklemez Başka Şeyler
- Tanju Duru: Duru Zamanlar
- Mustafa Gökdeniz: Yalan Söyle
